= Northamptonshire County Cricket Club in 2005 =

2005 season of an English cricket team

Northamptonshire Steelbacks
2005 season
- Captain: David Sales
- Ground(s): Northampton Milton Keynes Stowe School

Northamptonshire County Cricket Club in 2005 are playing their cricket in Division Two of the County Championship and Division One of the totesport League. They started the season at 12–1 to win the Division Two title. During the off season 9 players left.

The season started with a thrashing dispensed to the students of Bradford/Leeds UCCE. Then they lost their first Sunday League match, a rain-affected affair against the Worcestershire Royals. The first Championship game was drawn against Leicestershire after Northants captain David Sales left the declaration too late. The second Sunday League match was won at Bristol, narrowly by 9 runs. Then they drew with Derbyshire in the Championship, before thrashing Hampshire on the Sunday.

On 3 May the Steelbacks booked their place in the second round of the C&G Trophy, thrashing Denmark in Brøndby. They then lost by 10 wickets in the Championship to Yorkshire before drawing with Essex. In the fourth round of the Sunday League, they were thoroughly outplayed by Lancashire.

On 17 May they beat Middlesex in the second round of the C&G Trophy, before looking on top but only getting a draw in a tour match against the Bangladeshis and losing to Somerset in the Championship despite scoring 408 in the first innings.

They drew their first match in June against Lancashire, before enduring a tough last-ball loss to Middlesex in the National League, and then drawing with league leaders Durham. Their first win in June came at home, beating Gloucestershire by five wickets in the National League, and they stretched that win streak to four, beating Gloucestershire and Warwickshire, both at home, before travelling to Worcestershire and winning that game too. With three initial victories, things looked promising for Northamptonshire in the Twenty20 Cup, and despite winning only one of their last five games – against Somerset at Taunton – they still finished top of the Midlands/Wales/West Division.

However, that poor patch of form continued into the other competitions. Essex beat them twice, first in the National League and then in the County Championship, and then Northamptonshire had to bow out of both knock-out competitions – losing to Yorkshire in the C&G Trophy before being defeated with two balls to spare by Somerset in the Twenty20 Cup. In the County Championship, Monty Panesar spun them to victory against Worcestershire, taking nine wickets. A no-result with Nottinghamshire sent them further adrift of Essex and Middlesex in the fight for the National League title.

August started with two wins over Worcestershire – in the National League and the Championship – before going down by 64 runs to Lancashire in the National League. In the Championship, they beat Derbyshire by 182 runs, despite only having made 140 in the first innings of the match. They recovered from the National League loss against Lancashire, too, beating Middlesex by 14 runs on 15 August, but lost to Glamorgan in the same competition two days later. A two-day match with the touring Australians followed, Australia opting for batting practice instead of pushing home the victory. In the Championship, a bottom-of-the-table clash with Leicestershire ended in a draw, before they recorded a four-wicket win over Nottinghamshire in the National League and a 285-run Championship win over Lancashire.

They moved up to second place in the already decided National League with a no-result at Glamorgan, before drawing two successive Championship matches, with Somerset and Durham. Monty Panesar and Jason Brown then took ten wickets each in the final Championship game, which Northamptonshire won by an innings and 21 runs, before they rounded off their National League season with a loss to Essex.

== Players ==
- Martin Love
- Damien Wright
- Usman Afzaal
- Gerard Brophy
- Jason Brown
- Paul Coverdale
- Chris Goode
- Thomas Huggins
- Kevin Innes
- Steffan Jones
- Richard King
- Johann Louw
- Monty Panesar
- Ben Phillips
- Charl Pietersen
- Tim Roberts
- Bilal Shafayat
- Riki Wessels
- Andrew White
- Rob White

== Tables ==
=== Championship ===
2005 County Championship – Division Two
Pos	Team	Pld	W	D	L	Pen	Bat	Bowl	Pts
1	Lancashire	16	7	6	3	0	43	47	212
2	Durham	16	6	8	2	0	45	44	205
3	Yorkshire	16	5	10	1	0.5	49	42	200.5
4	Northamptonshire	16	5	8	3	0	45	46	193
5	Essex	16	5	7	4	0	51	36	185
6	Worcestershire	16	5	4	7	5.5	53	46	179.5
7	Leicestershire	16	3	7	6	0.5	45	45	159.5
8	Somerset	16	4	5	7	0	42	37	155
9	Derbyshire	16	1	7	8	0	31	43	116

=== totesport League ===
2005 totesport League – Division One
Pos	Team	Pld	W	L	NR	Pts
1	Essex Eagles	16	13	1	2	56
2	Middlesex Crusaders	16	10	5	1	42
3	Northamptonshire Steelbacks	16	7	7	2	32
4	Glamorgan Dragons	16	6	6	4	32
5	Nottinghamshire Outlaws	16	6	7	3	30
6	Lancashire Lightning	16	6	9	1	26
7	Gloucestershire Gladiators	16	6	9	1	26
8	Worcestershire Royals	16	5	10	1	22
9	Hampshire Hawks	16	5	10	1	22

== Match details ==
=== Northamptonshire v Bradford/Leeds UCCE (9–10 April) ===
Northamptonshire beat Bradford/Leeds UCCE by an innings and 62 runs

The first day of this game at Northampton saw Northamptonshire progress to 373 for 7 declared off only 69 overs. Kevin Innes top-scored with 80 off only 59 balls. The declaration left time for 23 more overs on the first day, in which Bradford/Leeds UCCE slumped to 60 for 5. The second day, Bradford/Leeds UCCE fared equally badly, being dismissed for 137. Northamptonshire chose to enforce the follow-on rather than opt for batting practice, and saw off Bradford/Leeds UCCE for 174 to win by an innings and 62 runs in two days. Spinners Monty Panesar and Jason Brown both got five wickets each in the match. (Cricinfo scorecard)

=== Northamptonshire v Worcestershire (17 April) ===
Worcestershire (4pts) beat Northamptonshire (0pts) by 31 runs (D/L method)

At Northampton, Worcestershire Royals captain Vikram Solanki led from the front, scoring 119 off 137 balls, including 13 fours and 1 six. Support from his colleagues took the visitors up to 211 for 4 off their 45 overs. Worcestershire director of cricket Tom Moody said of Solanki: "I can't see why he won't be in the mix for England section this summer. It depends how the selectors shuffle the deck, but I would imagine he will be in their minds for consideration at the very least. We were very confident he was ready for the challenge of captaincy and he has had a great start."

When Northampstonshire Steelbacks batted, Australian Matt Mason took 3 for 20, to leave Northamptonshire on 137 for 7 off 32.5 overs when rain prevented further play. Worcestershire won easily on the Duckworth-Lewis method. /BBC scorecard)

=== Northamptonshire v Leicestershire (20–23 April) ===
Northamptonshire (12pts) drew with Leicestershire (9pts)

The first day at Northampton saw only 26.2 overs, during which Northamptonshire progressed to 90 for no loss. On the second day Bilal Shafayat (59), Martin Love (50), David Sales (113), Damien Wright (95) and Gerard Brophy (52) all contributed with the bat, as the hosts moved to 433 for 6 declared. However, Northamptonshire bowled without luck, allowing Leicestershire to score 69 for 0 at close.

On the third day, Leicestershire progressed to 339 all out, with Darren Robinson scoring 100. However, the innings was controversial, with three debatable decisions going against the visitors. First Robinson was given out caught, when the ball probably hit his forearm. Then HD Ackerman was out leg before to a delivery that looked high. Then, at 220 for 5 Aftab Habib edged Jason Brown low to Martin Love at first slip. Habib thought it had not carried, and Love and one umpire were not sure. The other umpire said he was out, so off Habib went. But he returned to confront Shafayat who taunted Habib on the dismissal. Northamptonshire progressed to 45 for 0 at close.

The fourth day saw the game peter out to a draw, as a late declaration, with the score on 238 for 3, left Northamptonshire just less than two session to dismiss Leicestershire, who were set an unrealistic target of 333 to win in 58 overs. Leicestershire were 115 for 4 when the draw was agreed with 11 overs still available. (BBC scorecard)

=== Gloucestershire v Northamptonshire (24 April) ===
Northamptonshire (4pts) beat Gloucestershire (0pts) by 9 runs

Northamptonshire Steelbacks batted first at Bristol. Two quick wickets reduced them to 14 for 2. It was a slow pitch that was not conducive to a high score, but they made their way to 202 for 7 off their 45 overs, thanks in part to Damien Wright smashing three sixes in four balls in the penultimate over, and thanks to Gloucestershire Gladiators dropping three catches.

In reply Northamptonshire took wickets regularly leaving the hosts on 111 for 5. There was a recovery of sorts after that, led by Alex Gidman's 71, but the hosts were always on the back foot from there. Eventually they finished on 193 for 8, a deficit of 9 runs. Four Northamptonshire bowlers got two wickets each, Welshman Steffan Jones getting them for the fewest runs, as he conceded only 29. (Cricinfo scorecard)

=== Derbyshire v Northamptonshire (27–30 April) ===
Northamptonshire (12pts) drew with Derbyshire (6pts)

Northamptonshire batted first at Derby, and openers Bilal Shafayat and Martin Love took them to the sword, though Derbyshire dropped them both. Shafayat finished the first day unbeaten on a career-best 156 from 267 balls; Love was on 129 off 233 balls; Northants were on 292.

Shafayat added only 5 to his overnight score before being lbw, but Love went on to 168. Northamptonshire finally declared on 451 for 7. In reply, Derbyshire regularly lost wickets, finishing the second day on 135 for 4. On the third day, Johann Louw took 6 for 71 to force Derbyshire to follow on 210 in arrears. However, Derbyshire fared much better in their second innings – with both openers undefeated and their score on 119, 91 behind with one day to play. Rain then wiped out the final day's play. (BBC scorecard)

=== Northamptonshire v Hampshire (1 May) ===
Northamptonshire (4pts) beat Hampshire (0pts) by 98 runs

At Northampton, Northamptonshire Steelbacks' Bilal Shafayat struck a career-best 74 from 82 balls as Northants stormed to 266 for 9. Shafayat was dropped on 11 and 56, but congratulated by Hampshire captain, Shane Warne, who was taken for 53 in nine overs. Hampshire fell to 44 for 4 in reply and, despite 42 from Shaun Udal batting number eight, were never in the game as the Hawks were all out for 168. Northamptonshire seamer Ben Phillips took his second List A four-wicket-haul, removing Kevin Pietersen, John Crawley, Warne and Chris Tremlett on his way to four for 48. (BBC scorecard)

=== Denmark v Northamptonshire (3 May) ===
Northamptonshire beat Denmark by 8 wickets to progress to Round Two of the C&G Trophy

Northamptonshire's Charl Pietersen took 7 for 10 at Brøndby as Denmark fell to the competition's second lowest score in its history, for 56 all out. 24 of those runs were extras, with no Dane scoring more than 8 with the bat. Pietersen, who was playing in his debut match for the Northants first team said, "The ball was swinging about and they were perfect conditions for bowling. I just concentrated on getting the ball in the right areas and the conditions did the rest. I'm grateful for the opportunity I've been given by Northants. I'm here to learn and try to get myself in the first team on a regular basis. No cricketer wants to play second-team cricket and I'm no different. But one performance won't get me in, I've got to be consistent with my wicket-taking and my economy."

It took Northamptonshire one ball less than 17 overs to make 59 for 2 to win the match just before lunch as the Danes were humbled. Afterwards the Danish coach said, "We knew it was going to be difficult. We are short of money but we are trying to develop every time we play against different opposition. We have a lot of young players and it was good for them to test themselves against the professionals." (BBC scorecard)

=== Yorkshire v Northamptonshire (6–9 May) ===
Yorkshire (20pts) beat Northamptonshire (5pts) by 10 wickets

Northamptonshire were dismissed for 281 on the first day at Headingley, with Deon Kruis taking 5 for 59. It was a recovery of sorts, as Ben Phillips and Johann Louw put on 95 for the eighth wicket, but Anthony McGrath ended the visitors' resistance with three wickets. Yorkshire were 30 for 0 in reply at the end of the first day. Phil Jaques dominated the second day, with his 176, which helped Yorkshire to an all out total of 328, a small lead of 47. His fellow Australian Damien Wright recorded what turned out to be Northamptonshire's best bowling figures, ending with eight for 60. Northants were 9 for 0 at stumps on the second day.

On the third day, ten-man Northamptonshire capitulated. They lost their first wicket without a run being added, and never really got going, being 115 for 7 at close on the third day, and being dismissed for 175 and setting a target of 129 on the fourth. It was clear they were not going to win, and Yorkshire gave them no chances, winning by 10 wickets. (Cricinfo scorecard)

=== Northamptonshire v Essex (11–14 May) ===
Northamptonshire (12pts) drew with Essex (6pts)

At Northampton the home side batted first. Bilal Shafayat (153) and Usman Afzaal (168) scored two huge centuries to help Northamptonshire to 552 for 7 declared. When Essex finally got to bat, it was a different story, with the batsmen, particularly the tail, struggling. Johann Louw took 6 for 51, as Essex subsided to 178. The follow-on was enforced, and from then on the bat dominated again. Alastair Cook made a career-best 195 in 513 minutes, supported by Zimbabwean Andy Flower, who made 142 not out, as Essex eased to the draw at 495 for 6 declared. (Cricinfo scorecard)

=== Lancashire v Northamptonshire (15 May) ===
Lancashire (4pts) beat Northamptonshire (0pts) by seven wickets

Lancashire Lightning eased to a comfortable win against Northamptonshire Steelbacks to go third in the table, two points behind leaders Middlesex Crusaders. Northamptonshire won the toss and batted, but 215 for 7 was never going to be enough on a fine Old Trafford pitch, where Lancashire's Mal Loye smashed 94 not out with ten fours and three sixes. There were good news for England fans as well – Test all-rounder Andrew Flintoff bowled 9 overs for Lancashire without complain from his recently operated ankle, taking the wicket of England prospect Bilal Shafayat in the process. (Cricinfo scorecard)

=== Middlesex v Northamptonshire (17 May) ===
Northamptonshire beat Middlesex by 19 runs to progress to the Quarter-Finals of the C&G Trophy

Northamptonshire batted first at Lord's. Their top order performed well, with Usman Afzaal making 75 off 120 balls, and useful contributions from Bilal Shafayat (46) and David Sales (40). However, once they were out, 7 wickets fell for 40 runs, leaving them on 215 for 9, before Rob White smacked 36 to lift the visitors to 238. Middlesex got off to a good start, reaching 148 for 2 and 168 for 3, as opener Paul Weekes scored a century. However, then Damien Wright took 4 wickets for 1 in 7 balls, as Middlesex collapsed in more spectacular fashion than the visitors, losing their last 6 wickets for 8 runs. (Cricinfo scorecard)

=== Northamptonshire v Bangladeshis (20–22 May) ===
Northamptonshire drew with the Bangladeshis

On the first day at Northampton, Northamptonshire made 149 for 5 against the touring Bangladeshis. The tourists' bowlers lured the county batsmen into playing odd strokes to loose balls, but not Bilal Shafayat, who made 76 before mistiming one off left-arm spinner Enamul Haque. However, it was Anwar Hossain Monir who did the most damage, taking 3 for 67. The second day was wiped out by rain, which resulted in the third day becoming somewhat pointless – Anwar added the wicket of Matthew Friedlander to his tally as he finished with four for 113, while the Bangladeshis lost wickets quickly in their reply, crumbling to 105 for 5. However, 16-year-old prodigy Mushfiqur Rahim continued his good run of form, scoring 115 not out with fifteen fours and a six to lift the Bangladeshis to 309 for 7 in their glorified nets session. (Cricinfo scorecard)

=== Northamptonshire v Somerset (25–27 May) ===
Somerset (21 pts) beat Northamptonshire (8 pts) by six wickets

Somerset won the toss at Northampton and chose to bowl – and although they got the hosts Northamptonshire out in a day, Martin Love (166) and wicketkeeper Riki Wessels (son of Kepler) (102) made quick centuries to lift the hosts to 408. Conversely, however, two Northamptonshire batsmen batting at 4 and 5 perished for ducks to Richard Johnson. Somerset replied well, though, with 53 from opener Matthew Wood, but rash strokes gave wickets around everywhere as Somerset made 356 – admittedly only 52 behind. Off-spinner Jason Brown got six wickets for 112, just as many as he had taken before this game, while Ian Blackwell played a typical 59 off 77 balls.

Northamptonshire lost the wicket of Bilal Shafayat in their eight overs before stumps on day two but could still be reasonably pleased with the first two days' play. However, on the third day, their side collapsed with Gareth Andrew taking three for 31 as they crashed to 100 all out – Ian Blackwell removing two in his only over, which was also a maiden. In chasing 155, Somerset had some problems in tackling the bowling of Johann Louw, who took two wickets, but still managed a relatively comfortable six-wicket win. (Cricinfo scorecard)

=== Hampshire v Northamptonshire (30 May) ===
Northamptonshire (4pts) beat Hampshire (0pts) by four wickets

Hampshire Hawks batted first at The Rose Bowl, and despite an unbeaten 100 from Greg Lamb – the first of his List A career – Hampshire were tied down to 226 for 7 off their 45 overs, mainly thanks to three for 30 from Australian Damien Wright. Six wides from Chris Tremlett, who conceded 51 runs off his eight overs then cost Hampshire the game after Shaun Udal had taken three wickets to set Northamptonshire Steelbacks back to 135 for 5. David Sales added 49 with Wright before Ben Phillips guided Northamptonshire to four points with 26 off 12 balls and secured a win with ten balls to spare. (Cricinfo scorecard)

=== Lancashire v Northamptonshire (1–4 June) ===
Lancashire (7pts) drew with Northamptonshire (7pts)

There was no play on the first day at Old Trafford because of rain. The weather on the second day allowed only 54 overs, and in that time Northamptonshire made 148 for 5. They were all out for 175 on the third day, after James Anderson took 3 and Muttiah Muralitharan 4 wickets. Lancashire fared worse in reply, slumping to 27 for 5 and 35 for 6, before recovering slightly to 149 all out thanks to 48 from veteran wicket-keeper Warren Hegg. Northants lost 2 quick wickets in their second innings, before ending the third day on 94 for 3. This left a small chance of victory on the final day, but it wasn't to happen. Muralitharan took 4 quick wickets, but the visitors still made 225, a target of 252 runs. Lancashire were saved by captain Mark Chilton who kept his wicket as all about were losing theirs. The opener finished on 113 not out, as Lancashire saved the match ending on 188 for 8. (Cricinfo scorecard)

=== Northamptonshire v Middlesex (12 June) ===
Middlesex (4pts) beat Northamptonshire (0pts) by 2 wickets

In a close match at The County Ground, Northampton, Middlesex stole a victory thanks to intelligent running from Melvyn Betts and big scores from Jamie Dalrymple, who made a run-a-ball 76, and Irishman Ed Joyce who made 74 off 78 balls. Earlier, Australian overseas player Martin Love (111 not out) and Usman Afzaal (122 not out) had occupied the crease for Northamptonshire, sharing a 227-run partnership as the hosts made 283 for 1. In the end, however, Betts scampered the winning three on the last delivery, and stole victory from the jaws of defeat. (Cricinfo scorecard)

=== Northamptonshire v Durham (15–18 June) ===
Durham (10pts) drew with Northamptonshire (8pts)

Neither team really attempted to win this game at The County Ground, Northampton, which wasn't as badly hit by rain as many other games in that week. Batting first, Durham made 334 from a tricky position at 73 for 4, Northamptonshire bowler Damien Wright trailing off after three early wickets, and a seventh-wicket partnership between Ashley Noffke and Phil Mustard for 135 lifted Durham out of a tricky position. Dale Benkenstein got four cheap wickets for 29 in the Northamptonshire effort, while David Sales top-scored with 50 not out, but Durham looked on top. However, going at only three an over, Durham didn't ram home the advantage, captain Benkenstein choosing to boost his own average with 83 not out. Thus, Northamptonshire were set 414 in 70 overs – a ridiculous task – and despite two wickets from Gareth Breese, both teams were content with the draw. (Cricinfo scorecard)

=== Northamptonshire v Gloucestershire (19 June) ===
Northamptonshire (4pts) beat Gloucestershire (0pts) by five wickets

Gloucestershire Gladiators and the Northamptonshire Steelbacks were both forced to win this relegation clash, the last one-day game these sides would play before the Twenty20 Cup began. Winning the toss and batting, Gloucestershire crumbled from 53 for 0 to 55 for 4 in a collapse very reminiscent of what happened at their home ground on that same day in the England vs Australia game, but 63 from Mark Hardinges rescued them to a competitive total of 215 for 9. Bilal Shafayat and Tim Roberts looked to secure the victory, pairing up for 166 for the first wicket, but two wickets from Martyn Ball and two run-outs saw a collapse to 207 for 5. Shafayat, however, kept his cool, seeing the hosts to the target with ten balls to spare. (Cricinfo scorecard)

=== Northamptonshire v Gloucestershire (22 June) ===
Northamptonshire (2pts) beat Gloucestershire (0pts) by 81 runs

The Gloucestershire Gladiators took a massive beating by the Northamptonshire Steelbacks in their match at Milton Keynes. Despite Gloucestershire's Martyn Ball taking two for 18 from four overs, positively economical, five no-balls and the fact that 16 overs had to be found from bowlers other than Ball allowed Northamptonshire to run away to 224 for 5 – a Twenty20 Cup record . David Sales top-scored for the hosts with 78 not out, while Australian Damien Wright paired up with him for 84 for the sixth wicket, scoring an unbeaten 38 of his own. Gloucestershire were in trouble from the start, as opening batsman Craig Spearman was run out for a duck, and when Wright ripped out two more wickets, the Gladiators were 10 for three. Four wickets from Ben Phillips resulted in a serious collapse, as Gloucestershire were all out for 143. (Cricinfo scorecard)

=== Northamptonshire v Warwickshire (24 June) ===
Northamptonshire (2pts) beat Warwickshire (0pts) by 38 runs

Northamptonshire Steelbacks took their second victory from two Twenty20 Cup matches thus far, as they accumulated 143 for 5 in 14 overs, despite no batsman hitting more than 40 in a rain-shortened match at Northampton. Scotsman Dougie Brown took one for nine off three overs for Warwickshire Bears, but the target was too large for the visitors, as Northamptonshire bowler Ben Phillips removed four Warwickshire lower-order batsmen – his second four-wicket-haul in three days – as the Bears crumbled to 105 for 9. (Cricinfo scorecard)

=== Worcestershire v Northamptonshire (27 June) ===
Northamptonshire (2pts) beat Worcestershire (0pts) by 37 runs

David Sales (59 runs) and Usman Afzaal (46) lifted Northamptonshire Steelbacks to a very competitive total of 180 for 6 at New Road, where Shoaib Akhtar bowled a maiden over but was smashed for thirty-three runs in the other three overs he bowled. The hosts' innings saw Worcestershire Royals lose Graeme Hick early on, and despite 53 from Stephen Moore, Northamptonshire's bowlers had a good grip on the Worcestershire players – Johann Louw got the best figures for the Steelbacks with three for 25 – and Worcestershire finished on 143 for 8. (Cricinfo scorecard)

=== Northamptonshire v Somerset (29 June) ===
Somerset (2pts) beat Northamptonshire (0pts) by five wickets

At Northampton, Andy Caddick served up an unusually economical spell, taking two for 12 in three overs despite two wides. That helped tie the hosts Northamptonshire Steelbacks down to 95 for 6 in 12 overs in the rain-shortened game, and with Graeme Smith and Keith Parsons at the crease and the score 55 for 1, things looked bright for Somerset Sabres. Two wickets from Jason Brown helped put the odds for a Northamptonshire win down, but Somerset prevailed, Parsons hitting the winning runs on the last ball as Somerset finished on 97 for 5. (Cricinfo scorecard)

=== Glamorgan v Northamptonshire (1 July) ===
Match abandoned without a ball bowled; Glamorgan (1pt), Northamptonshire (1pt)

The weather at Sophia Gardens in Cardiff prevented a match from getting underway between Glamorgan Dragons and Northamptonshire Steelbacks. (Cricinfo scorecard)

=== Somerset v Northamptonshire (2 July) ===
Northamptonshire (2pts) beat Somerset (0pts) by five wickets

Despite Graeme Smith making a 53-ball century, and pairing up with Matthew Wood for 129 for the first wicket, Somerset Sabres still lost the match at Taunton. Smith's 105 helped Somerset set a target of 190, but none of the bowlers conceded less than seven an over to Northamptonshire Steelbacks' batting. Simon Francis was the worst, ending with 57 conceded runs in four overs, while Riki Wessels hit 49 not out with four sixes off 22 balls, and the Sabres had to see that Northamptonshire won with an over to spare. (Cricinfo scorecard)

=== Northamptonshire v Worcestershire (5 July) ===
Match abandoned; Northamptonshire (1pt), Worcestershire (1pt)

No play was possible at The County Ground, Northampton due to rain, and the hosts Northamptonshire Steelbacks qualified for the quarter-finals thanks to the no-result. (Cricinfo scorecard)

=== Warwickshire v Northamptonshire (6 July) ===
Warwickshire (2pts) beat Northamptonshire (0pts) by 41 runs

Warwickshire Bears were lifted to a total of 205 for 2 by hitting eight sixes at Edgbaston, Ian Bell carrying his side with 66 not out off just 38 balls. Nick Knight also made 61 as Northamptonshire Steelbacks failed to make any impact with the ball. The Northamptonshire reply was stifled by some reasonably economical bowling, with no regular bowler conceding more than eight an over, and good fielding which yielded one run out and stopped the boundaries. Warwickshire seamer Jamie Anyon took three for 34, for his second successive match with a three-wicket haul, while Usman Afzaal became top scorer with a run-a-ball 43. Ben Phillips hit 41 not out from number four to complement his bowling figures of two for 43. In the end, Northamptonshire made 164 for 6, but still went through – along with Warwickshire, who finished second in their group thanks to their win over Somerset two days earlier. (Cricinfo scorecard)

=== Essex v Northamptonshire (8 July) ===
Essex (4pts) beat Northamptonshire (0pts) by five wickets

Essex Eagles recorded their seventh win in eight attempts in the National League, cementing their place at the top. After Northamptonshire Steelbacks won the toss and batted at Chelmsford, three run-outs and Grant Flower's bowling, which yielded three for 21, saw them go from 185 for 5 to 200 all out. Essex's reply was secured by a healthy 90 not out from Flower after Essex had struggled initially, being 95 for 4. 29 not out from Dutch-South African Ryan ten Doeschate sent them past the target with ten balls to spare. (Cricinfo scorecard)

=== Essex v Northamptonshire (10–13 July) ===
Essex (22pts) beat Northamptonshire (3pts) by ten wickets

Essex won a spin-dominated match at Chelmsford. Batting first, Essex made 506 against Northamptonshire – whose normally astute spin attack was batted out of the game. Monty Panesar took a career best seven-wicket-haul in the innings, but conceded 181 runs in the process, bowling a mammoth 56.3 overs. The Northamptonshire reply was stifled by four wickets from James Middlebrook, as they crumbled to 141 for 6, but Ben Phillips and Damien Wright added 95 for the seventh wicket before Tony Palladino grabbed three wickets in four balls, and they finished on 247. Following on, Northamptonshire had made 203 for 2 when Essex' captain Ronnie Irani brought Alastair Cook on as seventh-bowler. The off-spinner, normally an opening batsmen, claimed his three first first-class wickets as three wickets fell for five runs, and Danish Kaneria wrapped up the rest of Northamptonshire's batsmen as they bowed out for 261. Chasing a target of 3, William Jefferson hit a four with the second ball of Essex' innings, thus ending the game. (Cricinfo scorecard)

=== Yorkshire v Northamptonshire (16 July) ===
Yorkshire beat Northamptonshire by 33 runs to progress to the Semi-Final of the C&G Trophy

Michael Lumb with 89 and Ian Harvey with 74 lifted Yorkshire to 270 all out at Headingley in the fourth quarter-final of the C&G Trophy. It was a bit of an implosion from 227 for 3, but runs came thick and fast in that period, so Yorkshire wouldn't be too disappointed with losing their wickets. Northamptonshire started well, getting to 163 for 2 after all their top four got starts, but two wickets from England Test bowler Matthew Hoggard started to turn the match. From then on, the Northamptonshire effort just stopped dead, as they lost five wickets for 24 runs to fall to 216 for 9. Steffan Jones and Jason Brown paired up for 21 for the last wicket, but it was too little, too late.

=== Northamptonshire v Somerset (18 July) ===
Somerset beat Northamptonshire by four wickets to progress to the Semi-Finals of the Twenty20 Cup

Northamptonshire Steelbacks failed to take full use of their home advantage, and Somerset Sabres escaped with a four-wicket win to reach their first semi-final of the Twenty20 Cup. Northamptonshire's batsmen made quick scores between 20 and 30, but Ian Blackwell's spell mid-match of three for 16 pegged Northamptonshire back to 118 for 6. Ben Phillips then made an unbeaten 27 to lift his team to 154 for 8, however, but he couldn't take a wicket while bowling. Despite three run-outs, Somerset made it through on the penultimate ball, as Matthew Wood recorded 58 and Blackwell a 16-ball 31 to lay the foundation before Keith Parsons set the pace late on with an unbeaten 38. (Cricinfo scorecard)

=== Northamptonshire v Worcestershire (20–23 July) ===
Northamptonshire (19pts) beat Worcestershire (6.5pts) by 82 runs

Worcestershire's fast bowler Shoaib Akhtar had a field day despite serving up no balls on the first day at Northampton, but that was only the first day, and Northamptonshire came back to win the game. The match had started well enough for the hosts Northamptonshire, but a menacing spell from the Pakistani fast bowler reduced them from 150 for 2 to 173 for 8 – Matt Mason helping out with two wickets as well. Shoaib finished with six for 47, including twenty runs conceded due to no-balls – while Monty Panesar and Jason Brown rescued the hosts to 299 with a last-wicket stand of 62. Young wicket-keeper Steve Davies then made a career-best 95 in his sixth first-class game, which helped lift Worcestershire to 381, a lead of 82.

Northamptonshire lost six wickets to spinners in their second innings, Ray Price and Gareth Batty taking three each while Shoaib was expensive, conceding 67 in thirteen overs, as Northamptonshire were bowled out for 364 – Bilal Shafayat making 84 and Riki Wessels 102. Chasing 283 to win, Worcestershire got off to a good start with an opening partnership of 54, but Northamptonshire's spinner Monty Panesar took three for 47 to leave them 139 for 5 overnight, Ben Smith unbeaten on 50. Smith only added seven to that score, while Panesar took three more wickets, bowling 26.5 overs in one straight spell which yielded six for 77. Johann Louw and Brown also got one wicket each, as Worcestershire succumbed for 200 to suffer their third successive Championship loss, which sent them out of the promotion zone. Worcestershire were also deducted half a point for a slow over rate. (Cricinfo scorecard)

=== Nottinghamshire v Northamptonshire (24 July) ===
No result; Nottinghamshire (2pts), Northamptonshire (2pts)

Only 26 deliveries were bowled at Trent Bridge by Greg Smith and Mark Ealham of the Nottinghamshire Outlaws, who conceded 20 runs to Martin Love as Northamptonshire Steelbacks moved to 25 for 0 before rain stopped the game for good. (Cricinfo scorecard)

=== Worcestershire v Northamptonshire (2 August) ===
Northamptonshire (4pts) beat Worcestershire (0pts) by 38 runs

Usman Afzaal scored 117 off just 103 balls as Northamptonshire Steelbacks ploughed their way to 275 for 4, Afzaal pairing up with Martin Love for the second wicket for a partnership that was worth 155 runs. The Royals' innings struggled from the outset, when Stephen Moore was dismissed for a duck, and despite 52 from Graeme Hick, Worcestershire imploded to 185 for 9 at one point, with Bilal Shafayat taking four for 33 with medium-pace bowling. In the final overs, Shoaib Akhtar had some hitting fun at the end, scoring 36 off 17 balls in vain as Worcestershire ended on 237 for 9. (Cricinfo scorecard)

=== Worcestershire v Northamptonshire (4–7 August) ===
Northamptonshire (17pts) beat Worcestershire (3pts) by 137 runs

Worcestershire gave away the initiative in the second innings, losing by 137 runs thanks to a frantic second-innings 190 from David Sales. It was the visitors, Northamptonshire, who chose to bat first at New Road, and after seeing off Shoaib Akhtar and Kabir Ali in a frantic opening spell where Bilal Shafayat went for 1, Northamptonshire looked fairly confident at 177 for 4. Then Shoaib returned, taking four wickets (to end with bowling figures of 9.2–1–55–5), and the wheels fell off as Northamptonshire lost their last six wickets for 12 runs. Stephen Moore continued his fine form, making 62, as Worcestershire looked to gain a slender lead – Ben Phillips taking a couple of wickets to give Northamptonshire some hope of tying the hosts down. Then, Damien Wright ripped through with some quick wickets, as Worcestershire went from 110 for 3 to 147 for 8 – only for Shoaib and Matthew Mason to give Worcestershire the lead thanks to a boundary-filled 47-run partnership.

Ali and Mason then chipped away at the Northamptonshire batsmen, and would have fancied their chances when the visitors were 64 for 5. However, a quickfire partnership between Sales and Wright turned the match on its head again, as the pair added 188 runs in 112 minutes – one run less than Northamptonshire had managed in the entire first innings – to send Northamptonshire into a relatively big lead on this pitch. Sales was 152 not out overnight, and powered on to 190 before Malik had him caught. However, the damage was done, and Worcestershire faced a steep target of 360 to win – or five sessions for a draw. Losing Moore and Graeme Hick early on, Ben Smith attacked for a fine 92, and a 45-minute flurry of runs from Zander de Bruyn gave Worcestershire some hope at 154 for 3. However, Monty Panesar got four for 40, Phillips dug out three for 56, Worcestershire lost the last seven wickets for 68 runs, and whimpered into a heap. Worcestershire were later deducted one point due to a slow over rate. (Cricinfo scorecard)

=== Northamptonshire v Lancashire (8 August) ===
Lancashire (4pts) beat Northamptonshire (0pts) by 64 runs

Despite four for 39 from Johann Louw, Lancashire Lightning recovered well from an early position of 52 for 3 against Northamptonshire Steelbacks. 80 from Andrew Symonds, a quick 44 from Dominic Cork and a captain's innings of 36 from Mark Chilton, took the score to 236 for 9. James Anderson, the former England ODI player, took three quick wickets to leave Northamptonshire struggling at 35 for 4, and from then on, it only went downwards for the Steelbacks. Andrew Crook wrapped up the innings with three cheap lower order wickets, and Northamptonshire crumbled to 172 all out. (Cricinfo scorecard)

=== Northamptonshire v Derbyshire (10–13 August) ===
Northamptonshire (17pts) beat Derbyshire (4pts) by 182 runs

Northamptonshire won the match at The County Ground, Northampton despite only posting 140 all out in the first innings. Derbyshire's medium-pacer Ian Hunter took four for 50 to get the best figures for Derbyshire, dismissing three Northamptonshire batsmen were dismissed in single figures. Graeme Welch chipped in with economical bowling, conceding only 21 runs in ten overs and claiming three scalps. Steve Stubbings and Michael di Venuto then made batting look easy with an opening partnership of 81, but two wickets from Johann Louw evened out the game somewhat, and Monty Panesar wrapped up Derbyshire's innings with three wickets on the second day, as Derbyshire were all out for 219.

After Welch's bowling had yielded two early catches to see Northamptonshire to 43 for 2, Australian Martin Love took centre stage. He slashed 34 fours to end the second day unbeaten on 159, an innings higher than the entire Northamptonshire first innings total, and the hosts closed the second day's play on 311 for 3, Usman Afzaal having added 59 from number four as well. Love added only 18 before he was lbw to Mohamed Sheikh, but half-centuries from David Sales and Riki Wessels, ensured that Northamptonshire could declare with a lead of 388, giving themselves five sessions to win the game. The weather forecast for the final day, however, had predicted rain, so Northamptonshire wanted to get in early. Spinners Jason Brown and Monty Panesar shared nine wickets, as Derbyshire battled out the third day to 204 for 9, but Australian Damien Wright wrapped up the innings by having Hunter bowled two balls into the fourth morning. (Cricinfo scorecard)

=== Middlesex v Northamptonshire (15 August) ===
Northamptonshire (4pts) beat Middlesex (0pts) by 14 runs

Middlesex Crusaders waved a definite good-bye to their hopes of a National League title, losing their second game in a row and failing to take advantage of Essex Eagles' loss the preceding day. Martin Love and Rob White slashed fifties for an opening partnership of 117, and after two wickets from Chris Peploe, Bilal Shafayat entered. Taking a fancy to young medium-pacer Chris Wright, the 21-year-old slashed five sixes and seven fours to make 85 not out – only his fourth fifty in List A cricket. Middlesex' reply was led by Paul Weekes and Ed Smith – the pair started brightly, making 105 for the first wicket, but following Smith's departure only one batsman passed 20, and Middlesex failed to keep up with the required run rate to finish on 247 for 9, despite 111 from Weekes. (Cricinfo scorecard)

=== Northamptonshire v Glamorgan (17 August) ===
Glamorgan (4pts) beat Northamptonshire (0pts) by five wickets

Glamorgan Dragons' bowler David Harrison bowled a fierce spell which only conceded 17 runs in nine overs – including five runs to extras – as Glamorgan limited the hosts Northamptonshire Steelbacks to 201 all out at Sophia Gardens. Northamptonshire's Riki Wessels hit 80 off 72 balls to take the score past 200 before lofting the ball to David Cherry to be last out. However, his 54-run partnership with Johann Louw gave Northamptonshire some hope of posing a challenge. Wickets fell with reasonable regularity, but captain Robert Croft refused to be dismissed, and his 81 not out anchored the chase. Richard Grant scored 22 not out as well, as Glamorgan made it to the target with 20 deliveries to spare, despite two wickets from Bilal Shafayat. (Cricinfo scorecard)

=== Northamptonshire v Australia (20–21 August) ===
Match drawn

Australia scored more than four times as many runs for each wicket as their hosts Northamptonshire at Northampton, yet the two-day time limit and Australia's hunger for batting practice ensured a draw. Northamptonshire won the toss, and put their guests in to bat, and Steffan Jones got two early breakthroughs as Australia were set back to 69 for 3 – Damien Martyn having spent only 14 minutes at the crease for his 26 – but Matthew Hayden and Michael Clarke spent good time in the middle making their centuries. The Australians declared on 374 for 6, and immediately dug into the Northamptonshire batsmen, who were effectively reduced to 48 for 5 when Tim Roberts retired hurt for 18. Glenn McGrath only bowled 11 overs, but used his time well, taking three for 24, while Shaun Tait and Brett Lee also got among the wickets with two each. Northamptonshire were bowled out for 169, and Australia opted to bat again, Simon Katich and Justin Langer both making half-centuries before the final day's play ended and the game was drawn. (Cricinfo scorecard)

=== Leicestershire v Northamptonshire (24–27 August) ===
Leicestershire (12pts) drew with Northamptonshire (8pts)

Leicestershire's first innings lasted three days, in which time they scored 390 runs for the loss of six wickets. The rain meant that only 119 overs were possible in three days. Leicestershire declared 22 balls into the fourth morning after getting 400, and spent the rest of the last day bowling Northamptonshire out for 261, Claude Henderson taking a season-best five for 63. With only one completed innings for each side, the match ended in a draw. (Cricinfo scorecard)

=== Northamptonshire v Nottinghamshire (28 August) ===
Northamptonshire (4pts) beat Nottinghamshire (0pts) by four wickets

Despite Northamptonshire Steelbacks conceding 28 extras, Johann Louw the main culprit by bowling six wides, they still managed to bowl their opponents Nottinghamshire Outlaws out for 207 at The County Ground, Northampton. Louw made up for his inaccurate line by taking three wickets, including top scorer Chris Read, while Australian Damien Wright grabbed five wickets for 37 runs. That was Wright's first National League five-for of the season, and he brought his seasonal wicket-tally to 23, the most in the division at the time. When Nottinghamshire were in the field, part-time leg spinner Younis Khan took three wickets, but it didn't help, as Ben Phillips and Riki Wessels took Northamptonshire home with four wickets and five balls to spare, building on the efforts of Australian Martin Love who had made 59 from number one. (Cricinfo scorecard)

=== Northamptonshire v Lancashire (30 August-2 September) ===
Northamptonshire (19pts) beat Lancashire (6pts) by 285 runs

Northamptonshire recorded their fourth win of the season thanks to their top order batting and their spin bowling. They had won the toss and batted, placing themselves well at 224 for 4, but the last six wickets yielded only 63 runs, and Lancashire seamer Dominic Cork could take three late wickets to end with four for 27. Northamptonshire were bowled out early on the second morning for 289, but immediately hit back, Damien Wright dismissing Lancashire's captain Mark Chilton for 0. In a bowling effort dominated by spinners – Jason Brown and Monty Panesar sharing 68 of the 94 overs bowled – Northamptonshire tugged away, and but for Stuart Law's 111, the hosts might have got a first innings lead. However, it was Lancashire who got a lead of 12, with Brown taking five for 113 from 36.3 overs.

James Anderson then took two early wickets, leading to a long bowling effort for him – he bowled 28 overs, but could not add to his wicket tally, while Usman Afzaal ran away to 147, adding 183 with Bilal Shafayat. Northamptonshire declared eight overs into the last day, with the score 400 for 6 to unleash their spinners on Lancashire's batting line-up – and they did so very successfully. Brown got his second five-for of the match, ending with match figures of ten for 135, and Monty Panesar also got three wickets as Lancashire collapsed in a heap for 103 – with only Chilton passing 20, in a reversal of fortunes from the first innings. (Cricinfo scorecard)

=== Glamorgan v Northamptonshire (4 September) ===
No result; Glamorgan (2pts), Northamptonshire (2pts)

Northamptonshire Steelbacks had set an above-average target of 283 when rain intervened at Sophia Gardens. Having been put in to bat by Glamorgan Dragons' captain Robert Croft, they got themselves to 155 for 2 thanks to fifties from Usman Afzaal and David Sales, and to finish the innings off Bilal Shafayat and Riki Wessels unleashed themselves with quick knocks. Wessels only spent 20 deliveries for his unbeaten 43, while Shafayat got a run-a-ball 31. For Glamorgan, Alex Wharf got three wickets, but conceded 71 runs from nine overs, while Andrew Davies was almost as expensive with 53 in eight, but took four wickets. Glamorgan saw off 33 balls from Northamptonshire in chase of 283 to win, losing Croft for 1 as they made their way to 22 for 1, but rain then put an end to play and Glamorgan escaped with two points. (Cricinfo scorecard)

=== Somerset v Northamptonshire (7–10 September) ===
Northamptonshire (12pts) drew with Somerset (10pts)

Ian Blackwell and Arul Suppiah made scores of 98 and 91 respectively, as Somerset made their way to 396 batting first at Taunton, although the lower order struggled against the spin of Monty Panesar – who dug out Richard Johnson and Charl Langeveldt for ducks. Matthew Wood set the pace, adding 63 with James Francis in an opening partnership where Francis only contributed 8 before he was lbw to Steven Crook, who had changed counties from Lancashire to Northamptonshire. That was Crook's only wicket of the match, however, as he finished with match figures of 25–2–107–1.

Northamptonshire got off to a bad start, losing the first three wickets for 76 runs, but centuries from Usman Afzaal, who made 112, and David Sales, ending on 154 before being caught and bowled by Richard Johnson, lifted them back with a 175-run stand for the fourth wicket. Fifties from all-rounders Damien Wright (who added 131 with Sales for the sixth wicket), Simon Crook and Johann Louw lifted Northamptonshire to 574. Then, Wright took two wickets and Somerset fell to four runs for two wickets. Francis made his second half-century and James Hildreth also scored 50, however, leaving Somerset at 163 for 4 at stumps on day three. The match was intriguingly poised, but rain ruined a potentially interesting finish, as no play was possible on day four and the match was drawn. (Cricinfo scorecard)

=== Durham v Northamptonshire (14–17 September) ===
Northamptonshire (12pts) drew with Durham (8pts)

Durham needed a draw in this match to secure promotion from Division Two of the County Championship, and the weather handed it to them, as only 222 overs of play were possible over four days. Northamptonshire went for the victory, declaring both their innings closed, but Durham hung on and escaped with eight points. Centuries from Usman Afzaal and Riki Wessels, along with 84 from Rob White lifted the visitors to 414 for 7 on the first day, despite Durham pacer Liam Plunkett grabbing five for 84 and after the second day was washed out they declared.

Northamptonshire broke through immediately, Damien Wright dismissing Jimmy Maher lbw for 0, and Wright got a further three wickets as Durham were 115 for 6 at one point. Gareth Breese and Plunkett saw out the remainder of the day, though, but Durham still needed 93 to avoid the follow on. Andrew Crook eventually broke the partnership, as Durham lost three wickets for 15 runs to go to 224 for 9, but resistance from Brad Williams saw him add 56 from number 11 with Breese to take Durham six runs past the follow-on target of 264. Northamptonshire set about making quick runs, and lost a bucketful of wickets, Callum Thorp taking three for ten as the visitors declared on 101 for 7 after 21 overs. Northamptonshire set Durham 246 to win, and got a good start when Damien Wright had Jimmy Maher bowled for 2, but Durham battled out 15 overs before rain set in and forced the game into a draw. (Cricinfo scorecard)

=== Northamptonshire v Yorkshire (21–24 September) ===
Northamptonshire (21pts) beat Yorkshire (3pts) by an innings and 21 runs

Northamptonshire spinners Jason Brown and Monty Panesar shared all ten Yorkshire wickets on the first day at Northampton. Yorkshire had won the toss and recorded a 66-run opening stand when the spinners first broke through, Panesar having Matthew Wood caught by Robin White. The rest was one of classic spin bowling – few runs and the occasional wicket – Panesar conceded just over one run an over (ending with figures of 27.5–11–32–5), and the average run rate for the innings was just above two. Former England all-rounder Craig White added 51 as Yorkshire were bowled out for 177. Early wickets from Deon Kruis reduced Northamptonshire to 34 for 2, but a three-hour stand of 220 across two days between Martin Love and Usman Afzaal took Northamptonshire to a lead of 77 with seven wickets in hand when Love fell for 95. Afzaal pushed on, making 157 before being dismissed by Kruis – who took five for 75 – and a 76-run partnership between Simon Crook and Panesar took Northamptonshire to 476 for 9 before the declaration came. Crook fell three short of a maiden first-class century, while Yorkshire leg spinner Mark Lawson was taken for 150 in 30 overs.

Yorkshire's scoring rate was, again, slow, and their second innings yielded 278 runs in nearly nine hours – though it was also frequently interrupted by rain. Panesar took the first five wickets, and despite partnerships of 50 for the seventh and eight wicket, Brown ended Yorkshire's innings with five of his own. The two spinners bowled 96.5 overs out of a total of 109.5 overs served up by Northamptonshire bowlers in the second innings, and ended with uncannily similar second-innings bowling analyses: Brown 50.5–14–95–5, Panesar 46–15–96–5. Brown and Panesar also split the 20 wickets equally between them – the second time in the history of the first-class game that this feat had occurred, and the first in 100 years. (Cricinfo scorecard)

=== Northamptonshire v Essex (25 September) ===
Essex (4pts) beat Northamptonshire (0pts) by seven wickets

Essex Eagles took their thirteenth win in sixteen matches to round off their one-day season and end with a 16-point victory overall. Their bowlers built the foundation for this victory, as all seven bowlers to be used got at least one wicket, and despite half-centuries from Australians Martin Love and Damien Wright Northamptonshire Steelbacks were bowled out for 208. Wright then took two wickets to set Essex back to 22 for 2, but Alastair Cook then followed his 117 not out against Worcestershire in the County Championship earlier on in the week. His 110-ball 94 – a career best List A score, improving his previous best by 32 runs – was part of a 168-run stand with Grant Flower, which took Essex to the brink, with 190 for 3. Flower then hit the remaining 19 runs with Ravinder Bopara, and Essex won with seven wickets and 25 balls in hand. (Cricinfo scorecard)
