= National League Division One in 2005 =

English cricket league season

== Table ==
The table, showing all completed matches is as follows:

2005 totesport League – Division One
Pos	Team	Pld	W	L	NR	Pts
1	Essex Eagles	16	13	1	2	56
2	Middlesex Crusaders	16	10	5	1	42
3	Northamptonshire Steelbacks	16	7	7	2	32
4	Glamorgan Dragons	16	6	6	4	32
5	Nottinghamshire Outlaws	16	6	7	3	30
6	Lancashire Lightning	16	6	9	1	26
7	Gloucestershire Gladiators	16	6	9	1	26
8	Worcestershire Royals	16	5	10	1	22
9	Hampshire Hawks	16	5	10	1	22

== Match by match round-up ==
=== Round one ===
==== Hampshire v Essex (17 April) ====
Essex (4pts) beat Hampshire (0pts) by 16 runs (D/L method)

At the Rose Bowl, Hampshire Hawks batted first, scoring 175 for 9, as Tim Phillips took 3 for 31. It was a good day for spin, with Grant Flower also taking 2 wickets. In reply, Essex Eagles' Will Jefferson was 44 not out, and Essex 69 for 2 off 16 overs when rain put an end to play, leaving Essex the winners on the Duckworth–Lewis method. England's star one-day player of the winter, Kevin Pietersen, managed only 5 off 14 balls for Hampshire before being bowled. (BBC scorecard)

==== Lancashire v Glamorgan (17 April) ====
Match abandoned – Lancashire (2pts), Glamorgan (2pts)

Simon Jones took 3 for 19 for the defending champions Glamorgan Dragons took on Lancashire Lightning at Old Trafford. Afterwards he said, "The older I've got the easier I've found bowling. My control has got better over the last couple of years and that showed today." Alex Wharf and Robert Croft also both took 2 wickets as Lancashire moved to 160 for 8 off 41.2 overs, with Hogg top-scoring with 41 not out. Rain then brought proceedings to a close. (BBC scorecard)

==== Northamptonshire v Worcestershire (17 April) ====
Worcestershire (4pts) beat Northamptonshire (0pts) by 31 runs (D/L method)

At Northampton, Worcestershire Royals captain Vikram Solanki led from the front, scoring 119 off 137 balls, including 13 fours and 1 six. Support from his colleagues took the visitors up to 211 for 4 off their 45 overs. Worcestershire director of cricket Tom Moody said of Solanki: "I can't see why he won't be in the mix for England section this summer. It depends how the selectors shuffle the deck, but I would imagine he will be in their minds for consideration at the very least. We were very confident he was ready for the challenge of captaincy and he has had a great start."

When Northampstonshire Steelbacks batted, Australian Matt Mason took 3 for 20, to leave Northamptonshire on 137 for 7 off 32.5 overs when rain prevented further play. Worcestershire won easily on the Duckworth–Lewis method. /BBC scorecard

==== Nottinghamshire v Middlesex (17 April) ====
Middlesex (4pts) beat Nottinghamshire (0pts) by 35 runs (D/L method)

At Trent Bridge, Chad Keegan took career best figures of 6 for 33 as Nottinghamshire Outlaws were bowled out for 173. By the time Keegan had finished they were 75 for 6, but the tail wagged. Middlesex Crusaders scored 91 for 0 off 21.3 overs, thanks to a half-century from Paul Weekes, when rain brought an end to the match. Middlesex were comfortable winners on the Duckworth–Lewis method. (BBC scorecard)

==== Table on 17 April ====
totesport League – Division One at 8 July 2005
Pos	Team	Pld	W	L	NR	Pts
1	Essex Eagles	1	1	0	0	4
1	Middlesex Crusaders	1	1	0	0	4
1	Worcestershire Royals	1	1	0	0	4
4	Glamorgan Dragons	1	0	0	1	2
4	Lancashire Lightning	1	0	0	1	2
6	Hampshire Hawks	1	0	1	0	0
6	Northamptonshire Steelbacks	1	0	1	0	0
6	Nottinghamshire Outlaws	1	0	1	0	0
6	Gloucestershire Gladiators	0	0	0	0	0

=== Floodlit week-day match ===
==== Glamorgan v Essex (22 April) ====
Match abandoned – Glamorgan (2pts), Essex (2pts)

This match, which was scheduled to be played at Sophia Gardens, Cardiff was abandoned without a ball being bowled. It was the first time for almost eight years a one-day league match at Cardiff has ended as a no-result. (BBC scorecard)

==== Table at 22 April ====
totesport League – Division One at 22 April 2005
Pos	Team	Pld	W	L	NR	Pts
1	Essex Eagles	2	1	0	1	6
2	Glamorgan Dragons	2	0	0	2	4
2	Middlesex Crusaders	1	1	0	0	4
2	Worcestershire Royals	1	1	0	0	4
5	Lancashire Lightning	1	0	0	1	2
6	Hampshire Hawks	1	0	1	0	0
6	Northamptonshire Steelbacks	1	0	1	0	0
6	Nottinghamshire Outlaws	1	0	1	0	0
6	Gloucestershire Gladiators	0	0	0	0	0

=== Round two ===
==== Gloucestershire v Northamptonshire (24 April) ====
Northamptonshire (4pts) beat Gloucestershire (0pts) by 9 runs

Northamptonshire Steelbacks batted first at Bristol. Two quick wickets reduced them to 14 for 2. It was a slow pitch that was not conducive to a high score, but they made their way to 202 for 7 off their 45 overs, thanks in part to Damien Wright smashing three sixes in four balls in the penultimate over, and thanks to Gloucestershire Gladiators dropping three catches.

In reply Northamptonshire took wickets regularly leaving the hosts on 111 for 5. There was a recovery of sorts after that, led by Alex Gidman's 71, but the hosts were always on the back foot from there. Eventually they finished on 193 for 8, a deficit of 9 runs. Four Northamptonshire bowlers got two wickets each, Welshman Steffan Jones getting them for the fewest runs, as he conceded only 29. (Cricinfo scorecard)

==== Middlesex v Lancashire (24 April) ====
Middlesex (4pts) beat Lancashire (0pts) by 69 runs

Lancashire Lightning won the toss at Lord's and put Middlesex Crusaders in. This looked the right decision as Lancashire's seam and swing bowling attack saw Middlesex fall to 6 for 3, and then 37 for 6. The Crusaders were then rescued by James Dalrymple, who took 81 off 82 balls to take them to 210 for 9 in their 45 overs.

Lancashire's reply started to come unstuck when both openers, Stuart Law and Iain Sutcliffe, fell in successive balls with the score on 23. The game saw the return of Andrew Flintoff, back after his operation and playing just as a batsman. But he could not stop the rot and made only 17 before falling lbw to Scott Styris. The Lightning were finally all out for 141 and Middlesex completed their second win in two matches. All eleven bowlers used in the match got at least one wicket, but the most prolific wicket-taker, Kyle Hogg, also conceded the most runs. (Cricinfo scorecard)

==== Table at 24 April ====
totesport League – Division One at 24 April 2005
Pos	Team	Pld	W	L	NR	Pts
1	Middlesex Crusaders	2	2	0	0	8
2	Essex Eagles	2	1	0	1	6
3	Worcestershire Royals	1	1	0	0	4
4	Northamptonshire Steelbacks	2	1	1	0	4
5	Glamorgan Dragons	2	0	0	2	4
6	Lancashire Lightning	2	0	1	1	2
7	Hampshire Hawks	1	0	1	0	0
8	Nottinghamshire Outlaws	1	0	1	0	0
9	Gloucestershire Gladiators	1	0	1	0	0

=== Round three ===
==== Lancashire v Nottinghamshire (1 May) ====
Lancashire (4pts) beat Nottinghamshire (0pts) by 1 run (D/L method)

Lancashire Lightning held on to win by 1 run after Nottinghamshire Outlaws needed 7 to win off the last over. Earlier new Englishman Stuart Law made 52 as the Lightning got to 178 for 8 off their 43 overs. England fans would have been pleased to see James Anderson take 3 for 18 from his 8 overs in reply as the Outlaws went to 170 for 6 with 12 balls to go, needing 9 to win. But Sajid Mahmood (who only conceded 2 from the penultimate over) and Dominic Cork saw Lancashire win a nailbiter. (BBC scorecard)

==== Middlesex v Worcestershire (1 May) ====
Middlesex (4pts) beat Worcestershire (0pts) by 3 wickets (D/L method)

The Worcestershire Royals put on 201 for 7 in their 44 overs, with David Leatherdale making 72 from 83 balls in an innings in which Graeme Hick became the heaviest scorer in the Sunday League's history. New Zealander Scott Styris took 3 wickets for Middlesex Crusaders, and kept the visitors from scoring freely. Middlesex made heavy work of overturning this total, even though they had 104 on the board before the first wicket fell. But ultimately they retained their 100% Sunday League record with 3 wickets and 1 over left. (BBC scorecard)

==== Northamptonshire v Hampshire (1 May) ====
Northamptonshire (4pts) beat Hampshire (0pts) by 98 runs

At Northampton, Northamptonshire Steelbacks' Bilal Shafayat struck a career-best 74 from 82 balls as Northants stormed to 266 for 9. Shafayat was dropped on 11 and 56, but congratulated by Hampshire captain, Shane Warne, who was taken for 53 in nine overs. Hampshire fell to 44 for 4 in reply and, despite 42 from Shaun Udal batting number eight, were never in the game as the Hawks were all out for 168. Northamptonshire seamer Ben Phillips took his second List A four-wicket-haul, removing Kevin Pietersen, John Crawley, Warne and Chris Tremlett on his way to four for 48. (BBC scorecard)

==== Table at 1 May ====
totesport League – Division One at 1 May 2005
Pos	Team	Pld	W	L	NR	Pts
1	Middlesex Crusaders	3	3	0	0	12
2	Northamptonshire Steelbacks	3	2	1	0	8
3	Essex Eagles	2	1	0	1	6
4	Lancashire Lightning	3	1	1	1	6
5	Worcestershire Royals	2	1	1	0	4
6	Glamorgan Dragons	2	0	0	2	4
7	Gloucestershire Gladiators	1	0	1	0	0
8	Nottinghamshire Outlaws	2	0	2	0	0
9	Hampshire Hawks	2	0	2	0	0

=== May Day Bank Holiday matches ===
==== Hampshire v Gloucestershire (2 May) ====
Gloucestershire (4pts) beat Hampshire (0pts) by 60 runs

Jon Lewis won the game for Gloucestershire Gladiators with 40 runs off 28 balls with the bat, and then taking out the Hampshire Hawks top order by taking 5 for 19 with the ball. Lewis had come in as a pinch hitter at number four after Matt Windows retired hurt. It was the Gladiators won the toss at the Rose Bowl, Southampton and, thanks to Lewis and 63 from Phil Weston, they scored 210 for 9. Hampshire's innings was stopped by Lewis, and despite a 55-run partnership between John Crawley and Nic Pothas, it was never enough, and they finished on 150 all out. (BBC scorecard)

==== Nottinghamshire v Glamorgan (2 May) ====
Glamorgan (4pts) beat Nottinghamshire (0pts) by 4 runs (D/L method)

Glamorgan finally managed to record a win at Trent Bridge after two "no results". In an innings that turned out to be restricted to 38 overs, they scored 204 for 4, which by the Duckworth–Lewis method was converted into a target of 222 for the Nottinghamshire Outlaws. In reply the Outlaws were 52 for 4 before rearguard actions by David Hussey (68) and Chris Read (47) lifted them to a challenge. Despite two sixes from Samit Patel in his 40, Nottinghamshire fell 4 runs short of par to end on 217 for 8. (BBC scorecard)

==== Table at 2 May ====
totesport League – Division One at 2 May 2005
Pos	Team	Pld	W	L	NR	Pts
1	Middlesex Crusaders	3	3	0	0	12
2	Northamptonshire Steelbacks	3	2	1	0	8
3	Glamorgan Dragons	3	1	0	2	8
4	Essex Eagles	2	1	0	1	6
5	Lancashire Lightning	3	1	1	1	6
6	Gloucestershire Gladiators	2	0	1	0	4
7	Worcestershire Royals	2	1	1	0	4
8	Nottinghamshire Outlaws	3	0	3	0	0
9	Hampshire Hawks	3	0	3	0	0

=== Round four ===
==== Essex v Glamorgan (15 May) ====
Essex (4pts) beat Glamorgan (0pts) by five wickets

Essex Eagles continued their unbeaten run in all cricket this season, after getting the 185 runs they needed for the last six wickets against Glamorgan Dragons at Chelmsford. Essex won the toss and chose to field first, and Glamorgan made 216 for 7. James Middlebrook was the main contributor with the ball, taking two for 27 off 9 overs, but South African pace bowler Dale Steyn also contributed with three for 34 amid no-balls and wides. Andrew Davies and David Harrison then reduced Essex to 31 for 4 before Ravinder Bopara (96 not out) and, once again, Middlebrook (46) took centre stage. With a partnership of 122, the two cut nearly two thirds off the target, and wicket-keeper James Foster contributed with 38 off 30 balls to see Essex to the target with five wickets and sixteen balls to spare. (Cricinfo scorecard)

==== Lancashire v Northamptonshire (15 May) ====
Lancashire (4pts) beat Northamptonshire (0pts) by seven wickets

Lancashire Lightning eased to a comfortable win against Northamptonshire Steelbacks to go third in the table, two points behind leaders Middlesex Crusaders. Northamptonshire won the toss and batted, but 215 for 7 was never going to be enough on a fine Old Trafford pitch, where Lancashire's Mal Loye smashed 94 not out with ten fours and three sixes. There were good news for England fans as well – Test all-rounder Andrew Flintoff bowled 9 overs for Lancashire without complain from his recently operated ankle, taking the wicket of England prospect Bilal Shafayat in the process. (Cricinfo scorecard)

==== Middlesex v Hampshire (15 May) ====
Hampshire (4pts) beat Middlesex (0pts) by 105 runs

Seldom has a captain regretted his decision as much as Ben Hutton of Middlesex Crusaders must have done when he chose to field on a flat Lord's against Hampshire Hawks. Before the match, Middlesex were top of the table, Hampshire rock bottom. It didn't show. Kevin Pietersen played a typical knock, scoring 80 off 50 balls with six sixes, while Dimitri Mascarenhas got himself a 26-ball fifty as Hampshire amassed 353 for 8 off 45 overs – a run rate of 7.84. Despite Owais Shah's 89, Middlesex were never in it, and crumbled to 248 all out in just 39 overs – Pietersen bowling the last over, conceding a single off the first ball before bowling four dot balls to Paul Hutchison and having him caught by captain Shane Warne on the last ball – meaning that Pietersen now had figures of 1–0–1–1 in one-day cricket. It turned out to be his only List A over all season. (Cricinfo scorecard)

==== Worcestershire v Nottinghamshire (15 May) ====
Worcestershire (4pts) beat Nottinghamshire (0pts) by 16 runs

Nottinghamshire Outlaws recorded their fourth successive loss, this time at New Road to Worcestershire. It was the Africans who made the most impact, as Zander de Bruyn's 62 laid the foundation for a target of 191 that was to become too large for the visitors, while the exiled Zimbabwean spinner Ray Price took four wickets for 21. With Nottinghamshire's overseas players, Stephen Fleming (5) and David Hussey (2) being removed early by Sri Lankan fast bowler Chaminda Vaas, the visitors were in trouble, and Price and de Bruyn – who came on first and second change – tied them down effectively, with 4–21 and 0–20 respectively. Even Paul Franks' and Gareth Clough's late attempts at hitting runs backfired, and Nottinghamshire were bowled out for 174. (Cricinfo scorecard)

==== Table at 15 May ====
totesport League – Division One at 15 May 2005
Pos	Team	Pld	W	L	NR	Pts
1	Middlesex Crusaders	4	3	1	0	12
2	Essex Eagles	3	2	0	1	10
3	Lancashire Lightning	4	2	1	1	10
4	Worcestershire Royals	3	2	1	0	8
5	Northamptonshire Steelbacks	4	2	2	0	8
6	Glamorgan Dragons	4	1	1	2	8
7	Gloucestershire Gladiators	2	1	1	0	4
8	Hampshire Hawks	4	1	3	0	4
9	Nottinghamshire Outlaws	3	0	4	0	0

=== Match on 22 May ===
==== Gloucestershire v Middlesex (22 May) ====
Match abandoned – Gloucestershire (2pts), Middlesex (2pts)

Just as at nearby Taunton in Somerset, where Somerset were playing Lancashire in the Championship, rain hit Bristol heavily, as Gloucestershire Gladiators were hoping to climb out of the bottom of the table. The visitors from Middlesex Crusaders were struggling, faltering to 95 for 5 after 21 overs with only Owais Shah hitting more than 20 – he made a half-century. Then rain intervened, and Gloucestershire were set 87 in 13 overs – however, when seven overs of the chase was over and Gloucestershire had made 40 for 2, rain stopped play again and the game was called off completely. (Cricinfo scorecard)

==== Table at 22 May ====
totesport League – Division One at 22 May 2005
Pos	Team	Pld	W	L	NR	Pts
1	Middlesex Crusaders	5	3	1	1	14
2	Essex Eagles	3	2	0	1	10
3	Lancashire Lightning	4	2	1	1	10
4	Worcestershire Royals	3	2	1	0	8
5	Northamptonshire Steelbacks	4	2	2	0	8
6	Glamorgan Dragons	4	1	1	2	8
7	Gloucestershire Gladiators	3	1	1	1	6
8	Hampshire Hawks	4	1	3	0	4
9	Nottinghamshire Outlaws	3	0	4	0	0

=== Match on 27 May ===
==== Glamorgan v Worcestershire (27 May) ====
Glamorgan (4pts) beat Worcestershire (0pts) by 53 runs

David Hemp gave Glamorgan Dragons a much needed win in the National League against Worcestershire Royals, as his 65 lifted the team to an unchasable 227. Despite three run outs, Glamorgan were rather pleased with their innings, but probably more pleased with their bowling – everyone got wickets, and the great batsman of the innings Zander de Bruyn, who made 51, was eventually frustrated enough to get run out. Former England U-19 player David Harrison notched up his second List A career five-wicket-haul, taking five for 33. (Cricinfo scorecard)

==== Table at 27 May ====
totesport League – Division One at 27 May 2005
Pos	Team	Pld	W	L	NR	Pts
1	Middlesex Crusaders	5	3	1	1	14
2	Glamorgan Dragons	5	2	1	2	12
3	Essex Eagles	3	2	0	1	10
4	Lancashire Lightning	4	2	1	1	10
5	Worcestershire Royals	4	2	2	0	8
6	Northamptonshire Steelbacks	4	2	2	0	8
7	Gloucestershire Gladiators	3	1	1	1	6
8	Hampshire Hawks	4	1	3	0	4
9	Nottinghamshire Outlaws	3	0	4	0	0

=== Spring Bank Holiday matches ===
==== Gloucestershire v Lancashire (30 May) ====
Lancashire (4pts) beat Gloucestershire (0pts) by six wickets

Lancashire Lightning were lethal with the ball at Bristol as they beat Gloucestershire Gladiators by six wickets in a low-scoring encounter. Dominic Cork was the most punishing bowler, taking four for 14 off nine overs (including five wides) as Gloucestershire whimpered to 86, as veteran wicketkeeper Mark Alleyne top-scored with 24 not out. Alleyne was one of two Gloucestershire batsmen to make it into double figures. Jon Lewis, who had earlier on in the day been called up to the England ODI squad to meet Bangladesh and Australia, took three for 40, but it was not enough to stop Lancashire from cruising to the target with nearly 25 overs to spare. (Cricinfo scorecard)

==== Hampshire v Northamptonshire (30 May) ====
Northamptonshire (4pts) beat Hampshire (0pts) by four wickets

Hampshire Hawks batted first at The Rose Bowl, and despite an unbeaten 100 from Greg Lamb – the first of his List A career – Hampshire were tied down to 226 for 7 off their 45 overs, mainly thanks to three for 30 from Australian Damien Wright. Six wides from Chris Tremlett, who conceded 51 runs off his eight overs then cost Hampshire the game after Shaun Udal had taken three wickets to set Northamptonshire Steelbacks back to 135 for 5. David Sales added 49 with Wright before Ben Phillips guided Northamptonshire to four points with 26 off 12 balls and secured a win with ten balls to spare. (Cricinfo scorecard)

==== Nottinghamshire v Essex (30 May) ====
Essex (4pts) beat Nottinghamshire (0pts) by six wickets

Former England international Darren Gough took four wickets for 16 runs, including both opening batsmen, as Essex Eagles strolled to a six-wicket win at Trent Bridge over Nottinghamshire Outlaws. Nottinghamshire were bowled out for 154 as Essex off-spinner James Middlebrook chipped in with two for 27 including the wicket of top-scorer David Hussey. Essex' batsmen all got starts in the chase, and captain Ronnie Irani, opening the batting, anchored the innings with a fine run-a-ball 53. (Cricinfo scorecard)

==== Worcestershire v Middlesex (30 May) ====
Middlesex (4pts) beat Worcestershire (0pts) by 32 runs

Middlesex Crusaders were lifted by a massive 160-run partnership between New Zealand all-rounder Scott Styris and former England Test player Ed Smith as they assembled 224 for 7 in a rain-shortened match at Worcester, in which Worcestershire's bowlers delivered six maiden overs. However, Worcestershire Royals' reply were hampered by wickets falling everywhere, along with lack of responsibility to keep the run-rate up, as Vikram Solanki made 40 off 66 balls and Zander de Bruyn 55 off 74 – too slow to chase 225 in 44 overs. When Gareth Batty was run out, a rot set in, as Worcestershire lost five wickets for 15 runs and were forced to crawl to 192 for 9. (Cricinfo scorecard)

==== Table on 30 May ====
totesport League – Division One at 30 May 2005
Pos	Team	Pld	W	L	NR	Pts
1	Middlesex Crusaders	6	4	1	1	18
2	Essex Eagles	4	3	0	1	14
3	Lancashire Lightning	5	3	1	1	14
4	Northamptonshire Steelbacks	5	3	2	0	12
5	Glamorgan Dragons	5	2	1	2	12
6	Worcestershire Royals	5	2	3	0	8
7	Gloucestershire Gladiators	4	1	2	1	6
8	Hampshire Hawks	5	1	4	0	4
9	Nottinghamshire Outlaws	5	0	5	0	0

=== First Sunday in June ===
==== Middlesex v Essex (5 June) ====
Essex (4pts) beat Middlesex (0pts) by one wicket

Essex Eagles won the top of the table clash in the National League against Middlesex Crusaders at Lord's, a match which the visitors looked certain to lose many times. Middlesex' innings opened slowly, as Paul Weekes and Ed Smith paired up for 101 for the first wicket but not scoring many runs in the process. A burst of wickets followed, which reduced Middlesex to 144 for 5, but a massive cameo from Scott Styris – who scored 71 from 43 balls, including seven sixes – wrested the target up to 244. In reply, Essex scored quickly enough, but lost many wickets, being 182 for 7 with Ryan ten Doeschate and former England all-rounder Alex Tudor at the crease. Tudor went quickly, as did No. 10 Andre Adams, and Essex required 26 for the last wicket. But ten Doeschate, who had earlier been smashed for 25 in his only over, now made up for it with a stunning display of hitting as the South African recorded a career highest score of 51 not out off 41 balls, to take Essex to the target with three balls and a wicket to spare. (Cricinfo scorecard)

==== Lancashire v Hampshire (5 June) ====
Hampshire (4pts) beat Lancashire (0pts) by 79 runs

Despite an economical bowling performance from England prospect James Anderson who took two for 18 off 7.5 overs, Lancashire Lightning imploded with the bat at home against Hampshire Hawks who moved out of the relegation zone as they took a 79-run win at Old Trafford. Hampshire batted first, and Derek Kenway top-scored with 65 as they were bowled out for 200, but Lancashire could only muster 121 against Hampshire's strong bowling attack, Chris Tremlett taking three for 30 while off-spinner Shaun Udal took three tail-enders for 11. (Cricinfo scorecard)

==== Glamorgan v Nottinghamshire (5 June) ====
Match abandoned – Glamorgan (2pts), Nottinghamshire (2pts)

This match, which was due to be played at Swansea, was abandoned without a ball being bowled because of rain. (Cricinfo scorecard)

==== Table at 5 June ====
totesport League – Division One at 5 June 2005
Pos	Team	Pld	W	L	NR	Pts
1	Essex Eagles	5	4	0	1	18
2	Middlesex Crusaders	7	4	2	1	18
3	Lancashire Lightning	6	3	2	1	14
4	Glamorgan Dragons	6	2	1	3	14
5	Northamptonshire Steelbacks	5	3	2	0	12
6	Hampshire Hawks	6	2	4	0	8
7	Worcestershire Royals	5	2	3	0	8
8	Gloucestershire Gladiators	4	1	2	1	6
9	Nottinghamshire Outlaws	6	0	5	1	2

=== Second Sunday in June ===
==== Northamptonshire v Middlesex (12 June) ====
Middlesex (4pts) beat Northamptonshire (0pts) by 2 wickets

In a close match at The County Ground, Northampton, Middlesex stole a victory thanks to intelligent running from Melvyn Betts and big scores from Jamie Dalrymple, who made a run-a-ball 76, and Irishman Ed Joyce who made 74 off 78 balls. Earlier, Australian overseas player Martin Love (111 not out) and Usman Afzaal (122 not out) had occupied the crease for Northamptonshire, sharing a 227-run partnership as the hosts made 283 for 1. In the end, however, Betts scampered the winning three on the last delivery, and stole victory from the jaws of defeat. (Cricinfo scorecard)

==== Nottinghamshire v Lancashire (12 June) ====
Nottinghamshire (4pts) beat Lancashire (0pts) by 61 runs

Lancashire crumbled in chase of Nottinghamshire's big target of 250 at Trent Bridge. Winning the toss and fielding, Lancashire got wickets at crucial moments, and had Nottinghamshire at 77 for 5 at one point. However, former England wicketkeeper Chris Read contributed with 68 not out – including five fours and four sixes – and with Mark Ealham scoring 35 as well, only James Anderson managed to stop the rot slightly by removing Ealham. Lancashire's bowling was at times wayward, and 26 wides were noted down in the extras column. In reply, Lancashire sold their wickets all too cheaply, as starts were made but not converted and number nine Dominic Cork top-scored with 40. Lancashire crumbled to 188 all out in 41.3 overs, well short of the target. (Cricinfo scorecard)

==== Table at 12 June ====
totesport League – Division One at 12 June 2005
Pos	Team	Pld	W	L	NR	Pts
1	Middlesex Crusaders	8	5	2	1	22
2	Essex Eagles	5	4	0	1	18
3	Lancashire Lightning	7	3	3	1	14
4	Glamorgan Dragons	6	2	1	3	14
5	Northamptonshire Steelbacks	6	3	3	0	12
6	Hampshire Hawks	6	2	4	0	8
7	Worcestershire Royals	5	2	3	0	8
8	Nottinghamshire Outlaws	7	1	5	1	6
9	Gloucestershire Gladiators	4	1	2	1	6

=== Third weekend of June ===
==== Essex v Gloucestershire (17 June) ====
Essex (4pts) beat Gloucestershire (0pts) by 55 runs

Andy Flower smashed the Gloucestershire Gladiators' bowlers all around The County Ground in Chelmsford as he and Ronnie Irani paired up for 139 to send Essex Eagles to a final score of 271 for 7. Flower hit 127 not out off 93 balls, as Upul Chandana especially got to be punished, conceding 64 runs from 9 overs. In reply, Alex Tudor snared out a couple of early wickets, Gloucestershire lost wickets at regular intervals, and even a quick hit-out from Chandana – who scored 32 off 30 balls – was not enough to take a win from the Eagles, their fifth of the season. Essex thus went top of the National League table along with Middlesex. (Cricinfo scorecard)

==== Worcestershire v Essex (19 June) ====
Essex (4pts) beat Worcestershire (0pts) by 39 runs

In a low-scoring match at New Road, Worcester, Essex Eagles prevailed to take a four-point lead into the month-long break in the National League, defending 203 for 9 with relative ease. Having won the toss, skipper Ronnie Irani was the first victim of the Worcestershire Royals bowling with a three-ball duck. Chaminda Vaas and Ray Price got two wickets each as Essex' batting faltered, but 34 from Ryan ten Doeschate saved the visitors. Worcestershire started positively, Graeme Hick and Stephen Moore pairing up for 66 for the first wicket, but part-timer Will Jefferson removed both of them in quick succession to start the Worcestershire rot. With only Stephen Peters surviving hostile bowling, scoring 41 not out, Worcestershire eventually finished on 164 all out. (Cricinfo scorecard)

==== Hampshire v Glamorgan (19 June) ====
Hampshire (4pts) beat Glamorgan (0pts) by seven wickets

A toothless bowling effort from Glamorgan Dragons became their downfall as Hampshire Hawks recorded a relatively comfortable seven-wicket win at The Rose Bowl. Batting first, Glamorgan were in a good position at 117 for 1, but Shaun Udal and Shane Warne chipped away at the Glamorgan middle-order. Robert Croft, the former England spinner, top-scored with a healthy 88, and an eighth-wicket partnership of 23 rescued Glamorgan to 211 for 7. It was never enough, however, as all Hampshire batsmen – excluding Darren Kenway, who was out for 4 – fired and took runs at will off the bowling. With 45 deliveries and seven wickets remaining, Hampshire eased to victory to increase the gap to the relegation zone. (Cricinfo scorecard)

==== Middlesex v Nottinghamshire (19 June) ====
Middlesex (4pts) beat Nottinghamshire (0pts) by 31 runs

Middlesex Crusaders used their home batting paradise at Southgate to good effect, smashing Nottinghamshire Outlaws bowlers to all corners as they amassed 314 for 7 in 45 overs – Paul Weekes top-scoring with a run-a-ball 106, while Irishman Ed Joyce pushed the accelerator in the final overs with an 18-ball 41 including six boundaries. In reply, Nottinghamshire were always going to be in trouble after crashing to 86 for 4, Weekes ripping out two wickets, but Samit Patel and Chris Read lifted them to 231 for 5 before Alan Richardson removed them both. That ended the Nottinghamshire resistance, as they subsided for 283, 31 runs short with three deliveries remaining. (Cricinfo scorecard)

==== Northamptonshire v Gloucestershire (19 June) ====
Northamptonshire (4pts) beat Gloucestershire (0pts) by five wickets

Gloucestershire Gladiators and the Northamptonshire Steelbacks were both forced to win this relegation clash, the last one-day game these sides would play before the Twenty20 Cup began. Winning the toss and batting, Gloucestershire crumbled from 53 for 0 to 55 for 4 in a collapse very reminiscent of what happened at their home ground on that same day in the England vs Australia game, but 63 from Mark Hardinges rescued them to a competitive total of 215 for 9. Bilal Shafayat and Tim Roberts looked to secure the victory, pairing up for 166 for the first wicket, but two wickets from Martyn Ball and two run-outs saw a collapse to 207 for 5. Shafayat, however, kept his cool, seeing the hosts to the target with ten balls to spare. (Cricinfo scorecard)

==== Tables at 19 June ====
totesport League – Division One at 19 June 2005
Pos	Team	Pld	W	L	NR	Pts
1	Essex Eagles	7	6	0	1	26
2	Middlesex Crusaders	9	6	2	1	26
3	Northamptonshire Steelbacks	7	4	3	0	16
4	Lancashire Lightning	7	3	3	1	14
5	Glamorgan Dragons	7	2	2	3	14
6	Hampshire Hawks	7	3	4	0	12
7	Worcestershire Royals	6	2	4	0	8
8	Nottinghamshire Outlaws	8	1	6	1	6
9	Gloucestershire Gladiators	6	1	4	1	6

=== Friday game ===
==== Essex v Northamptonshire (8 July) ====
Essex (4pts) beat Northamptonshire (0pts) by five wickets

Essex Eagles recorded their seventh win in eight attempts in the National League, cementing their place at the top. After Northamptonshire Steelbacks won the toss and batted at Chelmsford, three run-outs and Grant Flower's bowling, which yielded three for 21, saw them go from 185 for 5 to 200 all out. Essex's reply was secured by a healthy 90 not out from Flower after Essex had struggled initially, being 95 for 4. 29 not out from Dutch-South African Ryan ten Doeschate sent them past the target with ten balls to spare. (Cricinfo scorecard)

==== Table at 8 July ====
totesport League – Division One at 8 July 2005
Pos	Team	Pld	W	L	NR	Pts
1	Essex Eagles	8	7	0	1	30
2	Middlesex Crusaders	9	6	2	1	26
3	Northamptonshire Steelbacks	8	4	4	0	16
4	Lancashire Lightning	7	3	3	1	14
5	Glamorgan Dragons	7	2	2	3	14
6	Hampshire Hawks	7	3	4	0	12
7	Worcestershire Royals	6	2	4	0	8
8	Nottinghamshire Outlaws	8	1	6	1	6
9	Gloucestershire Gladiators	6	1	4	1	6

=== Post-Twenty20 resumption ===
==== Middlesex v Gloucestershire (17 July) ====
Gloucestershire (4pts) beat Middlesex (0pts) by four wickets

Middlesex Crusaders amassed 333 for 4 in 45 overs – that's nearly seven and a half runs an over, well over the average five in 45-over games – and still lost to Gloucestershire Gladiators. It didn't look as the score would be as big at first, as Paul Weekes with 81, Ed Smith with 53, Owais Shah with 55 and Scott Styris with 42 kept the score ticking at roughly a run a ball. However, Kenyan-born Jamie Dalrymple slashed four sixes and seven fours in an unbeaten 24-ball 60 to up the run rate late on, and Gloucestershire's Jon Lewis, who earlier in the summer had played ODIs for England, conceded 86 runs in nine overs. Gloucestershire always kept up with the run rate, however, as Phil Weston, Craig Spearman and Matt Windows lifted Gloucestershire to 275 for 2, and despite Paul Weekes' late burst of four wickets, Mark Alleyne and Ian Fisher shared a stand of 18 to see Gloucestershire to the target. (Cricinfo scorecard)

==== Nottinghamshire v Hampshire (17 July) ====
Nottinghamshire (4pts) beat Hampshire (0pts) by one wicket

Captain Stephen Fleming stood tall for Nottinghamshire Outlaws winning them the game as they chased down 241 at Trent Bridge. Hampshire Hawks had batted first, and no Hawk batsman converted their starts, and Gareth Clough's two for 44 threatened to stop their innings prematurely, as they were 152 for 6 when Kevin Latouf gave a return catch to Samit Patel. However, a big seventh-wicket partnership between Dimitri Mascarenhas and Sean Ervine lifted Hampshire to 240 for 8. Mascarenhas and Ervine also grabbed two wickets each in the Nottinghamshire reply, and things looked grim for the hosts when Chris Read departed for 4 with Nottinghamshire still needing 114 runs for the last four wickets.

However, Fleming and Mark Ealham put the chase back on with a partnership of 75, before Hampshire struck again with wickets in successive overs, and then Shaun Udal had Greg Smith lbw for 6. Needing 15 for the last wicket, Fleming shielded Andrew Harris from strike (Harris faced three balls in a partnership of 19), to end with 102 not out – his sixteenth one-day century – to win the match for Nottinghamshire with an over to spare. Notable also was the 36 extras Hampshire conceded, including six penalty runs. (Cricinfo scorecard)

==== Worcestershire v Glamorgan (17 July) ====
Glamorgan (4pts) beat Worcestershire (0pts) by five wickets

Worcestershire Royals would be ruing lost opportunities after the game with Glamorgan Dragons at New Road. Winning the toss and batting first, captain Vikram Solanki paired up for 91 with Stephen Moore, who would go on to make 104. Zander de Bruyn also made an unbeaten fifty to lift Worcestershire to 273 for 3. The Indian international Sourav Ganguly was the only Glamorga bowler to come out with some credit, as he got one wicket for 19 in his five overs. Worcestershire started creditably, snaring the wicket of Robert Croft in the second over, but Glamorgan sent out another pinch-hitter in Alex Wharf who made 38 before he was bowled by David Leatherdale, who took two for 35. However, Sourav Ganguly with 53, Michael Powell with 82, and David Hemp with an unbeaten 51 off 36 balls chased down the target. The Glamorgan batsmen took a particular liking to England Test spinner Gareth Batty who finished wicketless for 69 runs. (Cricinfo scorecard)

==== Table at 17 July ====
totesport League – Division One at 17 July 2005
Pos	Team	Pld	W	L	NR	Pts
1	Essex Eagles	8	7	0	1	30
2	Middlesex Crusaders	10	6	3	1	26
3	Glamorgan Dragons	8	3	2	3	18
4	Northamptonshire Steelbacks	8	4	4	0	16
5	Lancashire Lightning	7	3	3	1	14
6	Hampshire Hawks	8	3	5	0	12
7	Nottinghamshire Outlaws	9	2	6	1	10
8	Gloucestershire Gladiators	7	2	4	1	10
9	Worcestershire Royals	7	2	5	0	8

=== Mid-week games ===
==== Lancashire v Essex (19 July) ====
Essex (4pts) beat Lancashire (0pts) by eight wickets (D/L method)

In cloudy conditions at Old Trafford, Essex Eagles took full advantage after shaking Lancashire Lightning's batting order in a match shortened to 40 overs a side. Only Iain Sutcliffe and Mark Chilton passed 15, while spinners Danish Kaneria and James Middlebrook shared five wickets between them. Lancashire eventually finished on 154 for 8, and Essex were set 156 to win due to a small rain-interruption in Lancashire's innings. Despite two wickets from James Anderson, Essex cruised to the target with more than seven overs to spare, Grant Flower making 66 and Ravinder Bopara an unbeaten 45. (Cricinfo scorecard)

==== Glamorgan v Middlesex (20 July) ====
Middlesex (4pts) beat Glamorgan (0pts) by 111 runs

After Paul Weekes had given Middlesex Crusaders a solid platform with his 72, the young batsmen showed application as Glamorgan Dragons sunk to yet another defeat. Both Ed Joyce and Ben Hutton made 61 at rates well-over a run-a-ball, as the pair added 110 for the sixth wicket, before number 11 Alan Richardson finished off with a last-ball six off Robert Croft to bring the total to 284 for 9 after Croft had grabbed three late wickets. Then, Chris Peploe took four for 38, Owais Shah held four catches despite not being the wicket-keeper, and Glamorgan rolled over for 173 in 35.4 overs. (Cricinfo scorecard)

==== Table at 20 July ====
totesport League – Division One at 20 July 2005
Pos	Team	Pld	W	L	NR	Pts
1	Essex Eagles	9	8	0	1	34
2	Middlesex Crusaders	11	7	3	1	30
3	Glamorgan Dragons	9	3	3	3	18
4	Northamptonshire Steelbacks	8	4	4	0	16
5	Lancashire Lightning	8	3	4	1	14
6	Hampshire Hawks	8	3	5	0	12
7	Nottinghamshire Outlaws	9	2	6	1	10
8	Gloucestershire Gladiators	7	2	4	1	10
9	Worcestershire Royals	7	2	5	0	8

=== Third Sunday in July ===
==== Gloucestershire v Worcestershire (24 July) ====
Worcestershire (4pts) beat Gloucestershire (0pts) by 20 runs (D/L method)

Despite being strengthened by their new acquisition from the West Indies, Ramnaresh Sarwan, Gloucestershire Gladiators still went down at Bristol. Having been put in to bat by Worcestershire Royals after rain delayed the start, Kabir Ali dug out a wicket with his first ball, and despite 51 from Matt Windows Gloucestershire still only posted 168 for 9. In reply, Vikram Solanki and Stephen Moore batted 12.4 overs without loss before rain intervened, and Worcestershire were then 20 runs ahead of their Duckworth/Lewis target. (Cricinfo scorecard)

==== Nottinghamshire v Northamptonshire (24 July) ====
No result; Nottinghamshire (2pts), Northamptonshire (2pts)

Only 26 deliveries were bowled at Trent Bridge by Greg Smith and Mark Ealham of the Nottinghamshire Outlaws, who conceded 20 runs to Martin Love as Northamptonshire Steelbacks moved to 25 for 0 before rain stopped the game for good. (Cricinfo scorecard)

==== Table at 24 July ====
totesport League – Division One at 24 July 2005
Pos	Team	Pld	W	L	NR	Pts
1	Essex Eagles	9	8	0	1	34
2	Middlesex Crusaders	11	7	3	1	30
3	Glamorgan Dragons	9	3	3	3	18
4	Northamptonshire Steelbacks	9	4	4	1	18
5	Lancashire Lightning	8	3	4	1	14
6	Hampshire Hawks	8	3	5	0	12
7	Worcestershire Royals	8	3	5	0	12
8	Nottinghamshire Outlaws	10	2	6	2	12
9	Gloucestershire Gladiators	8	2	5	1	10

=== Midweek game ===
==== Hampshire v Worcestershire (26 July) ====
Match abandoned without a ball bowled; Hampshire (2pts), Worcestershire (2pts)

At Rose Bowl, Southampton it was not possible to play cricket due to rain, and the two teams Hampshire Hawks and Worcestershire Royals walked away with two points each. (Cricinfo scorecard)

==== Table at 26 July ====
totesport League – Division One at 26 July 2005
Pos	Team	Pld	W	L	NR	Pts
1	Essex Eagles	9	8	0	1	34
2	Middlesex Crusaders	11	7	3	1	30
3	Glamorgan Dragons	9	3	3	3	18
4	Northamptonshire Steelbacks	9	4	4	1	18
5	Hampshire Hawks	9	3	5	1	14
6	Worcestershire Royals	9	3	5	1	14
7	Lancashire Lightning	8	3	4	1	14
8	Nottinghamshire Outlaws	10	2	6	2	12
9	Gloucestershire Gladiators	8	2	5	1	10

=== First week of August ===
==== Worcestershire v Northamptonshire (2 August) ====
Northamptonshire (4pts) beat Worcestershire (0pts) by 38 runs

Usman Afzaal scored 117 off just 103 balls as Northamptonshire Steelbacks ploughed their way to 275 for 4, Afzaal pairing up with Martin Love for the second wicket for a partnership that was worth 155 runs. The Royals' innings struggled from the outset, when Stephen Moore was dismissed for a duck, and despite 52 from Graeme Hick, Worcestershire imploded to 185 for 9 at one point, with Bilal Shafayat taking four for 33 with medium-pace bowling. In the final overs, Shoaib Akhtar had some hitting fun at the end, scoring 36 off 17 balls in vain as Worcestershire ended on 237 for 9. (Cricinfo scorecard)

==== Table at 2 August ====
totesport League – Division One at 2 August 2005
Pos	Team	Pld	W	L	NR	Pts
1	Essex Eagles	9	8	0	1	34
2	Middlesex Crusaders	11	7	3	1	30
3	Northamptonshire Steelbacks	10	5	4	1	22
4	Glamorgan Dragons	9	3	3	3	18
5	Hampshire Hawks	9	3	5	1	14
6	Worcestershire Royals	10	3	6	1	14
7	Lancashire Lightning	8	3	4	1	14
8	Nottinghamshire Outlaws	10	2	6	2	12
9	Gloucestershire Gladiators	8	2	5	1	10

=== First Sunday in August ===
==== Essex v Middlesex (7 August) ====
Essex (4pts) beat Middlesex (0pts) by four runs

Essex Eagles extended their lead in the National League to eight points with a close win over Middlesex Crusaders and quenched nearly all hopes of a close finish for the title in that competition. Batting first, they had been worried by the opponents' captain Ben Hutton, who took three for 42, including top-scorer Ronnie Irani, as Essex faltered to 118 for 6. The Dutch international Ryan ten Doeschate ran well to make 44 off just 37 balls, as he played a major part in getting the Essex total to 202 for 8. Middlesex' top-order struggled, as only Paul Weekes passing 20 from the top seven, while Ed Smith and Ed Joyce both recorded ducks. At 102 for 6, and with skipper Hutton gone for 2, Middlesex still needed 101 runs with only four wickets in hand, but a patient 71-run partnership between Weekes and Ben Scott left Middlesex to hit 31 runs for the last three wickets. Scott hogged the strike, but could not get the necessary boundaries, and Middlesex finished their 45 overs on 198 for 9, five runs short of a victory that would have put them level on points with Essex. (Cricinfo scorecard)

==== Gloucestershire v Hampshire (7 August) ====
Gloucestershire (4pts) beat Hampshire (0pts) by five wickets

Mark Hardinges took four for 40 to help Gloucestershire Gladiators record a thumping victory over Hampshire Hawks, after tying down and frustrating the opponents' batsmen. Hardinges was the main culprit as Hampshire lost their last nine wickets for exactly 100 runs to post a total of 178, despite Nic Pothas, Sean Ervine and Shane Watson all making at least 40. In reply, William Weston and Matt Windows paired up for 106 runs for the second wicket, and not even Chris Tremlett, who took three for 34, could stop Gloucestershire from reaching the target with more than ten overs to spare. (Cricinfo scorecard)

==== Table at 7 August ====
totesport League – Division One at 7 August 2005
Pos	Team	Pld	W	L	NR	Pts
1	Essex Eagles	10	9	0	1	38
2	Middlesex Crusaders	12	7	4	1	30
3	Northamptonshire Steelbacks	10	5	4	1	22
4	Glamorgan Dragons	9	3	3	3	18
5	Hampshire Hawks	10	3	6	1	14
6	Lancashire Lightning	8	3	4	1	14
7	Gloucestershire Gladiators	9	3	5	1	14
8	Worcestershire Royals	10	3	6	1	14
9	Nottinghamshire Outlaws	10	2	6	2	12

=== Second week of August ===
==== Northamptonshire v Lancashire (8 August) ====
Lancashire (4pts) beat Northamptonshire (0pts) by 64 runs

Despite four for 39 from Johann Louw, Lancashire Lightning recovered well from an early position of 52 for 3 against Northamptonshire Steelbacks. 80 from Andrew Symonds, a quick 44 from Dominic Cork and a captain's innings of 36 from Mark Chilton, took the score to 236 for 9. James Anderson, the former England ODI player, took three quick wickets to leave Northamptonshire struggling at 35 for 4, and from then on, it only went downwards for the Steelbacks. Andrew Crook wrapped up the innings with three cheap lower order wickets, and Northamptonshire crumbled to 172 all out. (Cricinfo scorecard)

==== Gloucestershire v Nottinghamshire (9 August) ====
Nottinghamshire (4pts) beat Gloucestershire (0pts) by eight wickets

Gloucestershire Gladiators were gracious hosts at Cheltenham College, as they allowed themselves to be beaten by eight wickets and bowled out for 87 by Nottinghamshire Outlaws. Despite the low scores, it took a whole 35.1 overs to get them out, Ramnaresh Sarwan and Mark Alleyne gluing to the crease for scores of 15 off 46 balls and 11 off 28 balls respectively. All the bowlers got wickets, with the exception of spinner Samit Patel, who nevertheless got fine figures of 5–2–7–0. Pakistani batsman and part-time leg-spinner Younis Khan, with only ten List A wickets to his name, got three for 5 – including Sarwan and Alleyne – to wrap up Gloucestershire's resistance. In reply, Anurag Singh hit an unbeaten 30 and Younis Khan 28 not out as Nottinghamshire eased to the target in half the time allotted. (Cricinfo scorecard)

==== Hampshire v Lancashire (10 August) ====
Hampshire (4pts) beat Lancashire (0pts) by eight runs

Hampshire Hawks recovered to post a challenging target after early setbacks, caused by two wickets from Lancashire Lightning spinner Andrew Symonds and losing Nic Pothas early through a run out. They struggled to 86 for 4 before Shane Watson put them back on track with an unbeaten 106, helped by Greg Lamb, who made 42. In a match dominated by foreign or foreign-born players, Marcus North and Symonds put on a 94-run partnership to help Lancashire to 155 for 2. However, Australian all-rounder Andy Bichel took three for 34, Dimitri Mascarenhas rounded off his nine overs by taking two wickets with the two last balls, and Lancashire were left to score 23 from 24 balls with a wicket in hand. James Anderson tried, hitting two fours, but with nine required off ten balls he was lbw to Shaun Udal for nine to give Hampshire an eight-run victory. (Cricinfo scorecard)

==== Table at 10 August ====
totesport League – Division One at 10 August 2005
Pos	Team	Pld	W	L	NR	Pts
1	Essex Eagles	10	9	0	1	38
2	Middlesex Crusaders	12	7	4	1	30
3	Northamptonshire Steelbacks	11	5	5	1	22
4	Hampshire Hawks	11	4	6	1	18
5	Lancashire Lightning	10	4	5	1	18
6	Glamorgan Dragons	9	3	3	3	18
7	Nottinghamshire Outlaws	11	3	6	2	16
8	Gloucestershire Gladiators	10	3	6	1	14
9	Worcestershire Royals	10	3	6	1	14

=== Matches of 14–15 August ===
==== Glamorgan v Lancashire (14 August) ====
Lancashire (4pts) beat Glamorgan (0pts) by eight wickets

Lancashire Lightning recorded a relatively easy victory at Colwyn Bay, beating Glamorgan Dragons by eight wickets. Dominic Cork took four for 37 as the Dragons crashed to 173 all out, Alex Wharf – who had been promoted to three as pinch hitter – top scoring with 36. Mal Loye then carried Lancashire past the target with 79 not out, while Stuart Law, Marcus North and Andrew Symonds all passed 25. (Cricinfo scorecard)

==== Gloucestershire v Essex (14 August) ====
Gloucestershire (4pts) beat Essex (0pts) by 60 runs

Essex Eagles imploded to 122 all out in chase of a small target to bring a tiny measure of excitement into the National League title race, while Gloucestershire Gladiators recorded a rare victory to take them out of the relegation zone. Batting first, Gloucestershire were bowled out for 182 in only 44.1 overs, Matt Windows top-scoring with 57 while Darren Gough and Grant Flower took three wickets each. Malinga Bandara and Martyn Ball shared the highest partnership of the match, adding 59 runs for the ninth wicket to carry Gloucestershire from 118 for 8. Essex then crawled to 49 for 7, James Averis finishing with amazing figures of 8–2–9–2, while Ball and Mark Alleyne also grabbed two wickets each. Despite 46 from New Zealand all-rounder Andre Adams, Essex were all out for 122 when Adams was caught off the bowling of Mark Hardinges. (Cricinfo scorecard)

==== Middlesex v Northamptonshire (15 August) ====
Northamptonshire (4pts) beat Middlesex (0pts) by 14 runs

Middlesex Crusaders waved a definite good-bye to their hopes of a National League title, losing their second game in a row and failing to take advantage of Essex Eagles' loss the preceding day. Martin Love and Rob White slashed fifties for an opening partnership of 117, and after two wickets from Chris Peploe, Bilal Shafayat entered. Taking a fancy to young medium-pacer Chris Wright, the 21-year-old slashed five sixes and seven fours to make 85 not out – only his fourth fifty in List A cricket. Middlesex' reply was led by Paul Weekes and Ed Smith – the pair started brightly, making 105 for the first wicket, but following Smith's departure only one batsman passed 20, and Middlesex failed to keep up with the required run rate to finish on 247 for 9, despite 111 from Weekes. (Cricinfo scorecard)

==== Table at 15 August ====
totesport League – Division One at 15 August 2005
Pos	Team	Pld	W	L	NR	Pts
1	Essex Eagles	11	9	1	1	38
2	Middlesex Crusaders	13	7	5	1	30
3	Northamptonshire Steelbacks	12	6	5	1	26
4	Lancashire Lightning	11	5	5	1	22
5	Hampshire Hawks	11	4	6	1	18
6	Gloucestershire Gladiators	11	4	6	1	18
7	Glamorgan Dragons	10	3	4	3	18
8	Nottinghamshire Outlaws	11	3	6	2	16
9	Worcestershire Royals	10	3	6	1	14

=== Midweek game ===
==== Northamptonshire v Glamorgan (17 August) ====
Glamorgan (4pts) beat Northamptonshire (0pts) by five wickets

Glamorgan Dragons' bowler David Harrison bowled a fierce spell which only conceded 17 runs in nine overs – including five runs to extras – as Glamorgan limited the hosts Northamptonshire Steelbacks to 201 all out at Sophia Gardens. Northamptonshire's Riki Wessels hit 80 off 72 balls to take the score past 200 before lofting the ball to David Cherry to be last out. However, his 54-run partnership with Johann Louw gave Northamptonshire some hope of posing a challenge. Wickets fell with reasonable regularity, but captain Robert Croft refused to be dismissed, and his 81 not out anchored the chase. Richard Grant scored 22 not out as well, as Glamorgan made it to the target with 20 deliveries to spare, despite two wickets from Bilal Shafayat. (Cricinfo scorecard)

==== Table at 17 August ====
totesport League – Division One at 17 August 2005
Pos	Team	Pld	W	L	NR	Pts
1	Essex Eagles	11	9	1	1	38
2	Middlesex Crusaders	13	7	5	1	30
3	Northamptonshire Steelbacks	13	6	6	1	26
4	Lancashire Lightning	11	5	5	1	22
5	Glamorgan Dragons	11	4	4	3	22
6	Hampshire Hawks	11	4	6	1	18
7	Gloucestershire Gladiators	11	4	6	1	18
8	Nottinghamshire Outlaws	11	3	6	2	16
9	Worcestershire Royals	10	3	6	1	14

=== Matches of 22–24 August ===
==== Essex v Nottinghamshire (22 August) ====
No result; Essex (2pts), Nottinghamshire (2pts)

Essex Eagles edged closer to the National League title with two points at Chelmsford, though rain ravaged the game. Only eight overs of play were possible before the umpires called off the game, and in that time Essex lost both openers but still made 53 for 2 – a score including six wides bowled by the Nottinghamshire Outlaws bowlers. (Cricinfo scorecard)

==== Lancashire v Gloucestershire (22 August) ====
Gloucestershire (4pts) beat Lancashire (0pts) by six wickets

Three centuries were recorded at Old Trafford, as Gloucestershire Gladiators snatched a victory over the hosting Lancashire Lightning after being regarded with no chance earlier on. The Gladiators won the toss and got immediate success, as Jon Lewis dismissed Mal Loye with the second ball of the day, but pretty much everything went against Gloucestershire from then on, as Stuart Law, Mark Chilton and Andrew Symonds flayed the bowling to all corners. Symonds took 88 balls for his century, and went on to make 129 before being bowled by James Averis – who finished with four for 40. Law and Chilton also made fifties, but Averis' late spell and a slow 39-ball 11 from Marcus North ensured that the total ended on 267 for 7. Then, James Anderson had three men caught off his bowling, as Gloucestershire crashed to 47 for 4. However, Anderson finished his spell, and Ramnaresh Sarwan crafted a century – which was shortly followed by Mark Hardinges reaching his first one-day century of his career, and in the process lifting his List A career batting average from 14.23 to 17.50, still below par for a specialist batsman like Hardinges. However, the pair added 221 runs in 116 minutes for the fifth wicket, hitting six sixes along the way, as they guided Gloucestershire out of the relegation zone in the National League. (Cricinfo scorecard)

==== Worcestershire v Hampshire (22 August) ====
Hampshire (4pts) beat Worcestershire (0pts) by four wickets

Hampshire Hawks got the four points from a closely fought match at New Road. Worcestershire Royals had won the toss and chosen to bat, and their innings was shortened to 34 overs out of a scheduled 45 due to rain. Wickets fell regularly, four batsmen being dismissed with scores in the thirties, and the final score of 185 for 7 did not look too threatening. John Crawley and Shane Watson put Hampshire back on track after two early wickets from Kabir Ali shook them, but an economical spell from Ray Price which yielded two wickets was nearly enough. However, the other spinner Gareth Batty was not nearly as economical, and Greg Lamb took him for runs to end with 16 not out and win the game for Hampshire.

==== Glamorgan v Gloucestershire (23 August) ====
Glamorgan (4pts) beat Gloucestershire (0pts) by four wickets

Gloucestershire Gladiators crashed back into the relegation zone with a defeat against Glamorgan Dragons at Sophia Gardens, succumbing to medium pace bowler David Harrison, who bowled four maiden overs to end with bowling figures of 9–4–16–2. Despite half-centuries from Kabir Ali and Alex Gidman, who looked to give the visitors a comfortable target after moving to 103 for 3, Dean Cosker ripped out three quick wickets, and Gidman was forced to consolidate. He did top score with 62, but Glamorgan were set a rather modest target of 195 to win. Jon Lewis made inroads with his medium pace early on, taking three wickets as Glamorgan stuttered to 40 for 4, but Michael Powell and Dan Cherry put Glamorgan back in it with a 79-run stand, and Gloucestershire's bowlers were made to rue their 15 wides, as they helped Glamorgan to reach their target with two overs remaining. (Cricinfo scorecard)

==== Lancashire v Worcestershire (24 August) ====
Worcestershire (4pts) beat Lancashire (0pts) by four wickets

Chris Gayle, Worcestershire's new overseas player after Shoaib Akhtar left to play in the 2005 Afro-Asia Cup, helped Worcestershire Royals to an important victory in the National League, while Lancashire Lightning suffered their third one-day defeat in five days. Having won the toss and batted, Lancashire regularly lost wickets, and the innings of Australian Marcus North was symptomatic – he made a 19-ball 2. Stuart Law, however, scored 82, and was along with Glen Chapple the only batsman to really keep up the scoring rate. Lancashire could only muster a total of 195 for 9, and defending that target quickly became difficult ash Gayle slashed eight fours and a six on his way to a 41-ball 53. Despite Chapple's returns of 9–0–23–4 and Anderson taking two for 47, Worcestershire made it to the target with four wickets and 5.3 overs in hand. (Cricinfo scorecard)

==== Table at 24 August ====
totesport League – Division One at 24 August 2005
Pos	Team	Pld	W	L	NR	Pts
1	Essex Eagles	12	9	1	2	40
2	Middlesex Crusaders	13	7	5	1	30
3	Northamptonshire Steelbacks	13	6	6	1	26
4	Glamorgan Dragons	12	5	4	3	26
5	Lancashire Lightning	13	5	7	1	22
6	Hampshire Hawks	12	5	6	1	22
7	Gloucestershire Gladiators	13	5	7	1	22
8	Worcestershire Royals	12	4	7	1	18
9	Nottinghamshire Outlaws	12	3	6	3	18

=== Last Sunday in August ===
==== Essex v Hampshire (28 August) ====
Essex (4pts) beat Hampshire (0pts) by 12 runs

Economical bowling from André Nel and Danish Kaneria gave Essex Eagles the victory over Hampshire Hawks at Chelmsford, and the four points for the win increased their lead in the National League to an unassailable 14 points and secured the National League title. Essex opener Will Jefferson kept his calm while the rest of the top order deserted him, making 88, but when three wickets fell for only three runs and the score was 172 for 7 Hampshire would have fancied their chances of bowling Essex out. Only two more wickets fell, though, as contributions from Ryan ten Doeschate, Graham Napier and Kaneria propelled Essex to 222 for 9 at the end of their 45 overs. Hampshire and England fast bowler Chris Tremlett got Napier, ten Doeschate and James Middlebrook out to end with three wickets for 48. Despite John Crawley and Nic Pothas recording a first-wicket partnership of 95, Kaneria kept his calm, only allowing 26 runs off his nine overs, and boundaries were rare after Pothas and Crawley were dismissed. In the end, Hampshire finished on 210 for 8, 13 runs short of victory – they could put some of the blame on their overseas players, as Australians Shane Watson and Andy Bichel contributed only four runs off 18 deliveries. (Cricinfo scorecard)

==== Northamptonshire v Nottinghamshire (28 August) ====
Northamptonshire (4pts) beat Nottinghamshire (0pts) by four wickets

Despite Northamptonshire Steelbacks conceding 28 extras, Johann Louw the main culprit by bowling six wides, they still managed to bowl their opponents Nottinghamshire Outlaws out for 207 at The County Ground, Northampton. Louw made up for his inaccurate line by taking three wickets, including top scorer Chris Read, while Australian Damien Wright grabbed five wickets for 37 runs. That was Wright's first National League five-for of the season, and he brought his seasonal wicket-tally to 23, the most in the division at the time. When Nottinghamshire were in the field, part-time leg spinner Younis Khan took three wickets, but it didn't help, as Ben Phillips and Riki Wessels took Northamptonshire home with four wickets and five balls to spare, building on the efforts of Australian Martin Love who had made 59 from number one. (Cricinfo scorecard)

==== Table at 28 August ====
totesport League – Division One at 28 August 2005
Pos	Team	Pld	W	L	NR	Pts
1	Essex Eagles	13	10	1	2	44
2	Middlesex Crusaders	13	7	5	1	30
3	Northamptonshire Steelbacks	14	7	6	1	30
4	Glamorgan Dragons	12	5	4	3	26
5	Lancashire Lightning	13	5	7	1	22
6	Hampshire Hawks	13	5	7	1	22
7	Gloucestershire Gladiators	13	5	7	1	22
8	Worcestershire Royals	12	4	7	1	18
9	Nottinghamshire Outlaws	13	3	7	3	18

=== First weekend of September ===
==== Glamorgan v Northamptonshire (4 September) ====
No result; Glamorgan (2pts), Northamptonshire (2pts)

Northamptonshire Steelbacks had set an above-average target of 283 when rain intervened at Sophia Gardens. Having been put in to bat by Glamorgan Dragons' captain Robert Croft, they got themselves to 155 for 2 thanks to fifties from Usman Afzaal and David Sales, and to finish the innings off Bilal Shafayat and Riki Wessels unleashed themselves with quick knocks. Wessels only spent 20 deliveries for his unbeaten 43, while Shafayat got a run-a-ball 31. For Glamorgan, Alex Wharf got three wickets, but conceded 71 runs from nine overs, while Andrew Davies was almost as expensive with 53 in eight, but took four wickets. Glamorgan saw off 33 balls from Northamptonshire in chase of 283 to win, losing Croft for 1 as they made their way to 22 for 1, but rain then put an end to play and Glamorgan escaped with two points. (Cricinfo scorecard)

==== Worcestershire v Gloucestershire (4 September) ====
Worcestershire (4pts) beat Gloucestershire (0pts) by eight wickets

A menacing spell from Shoaib Akhtar, who got six wickets for 16 runs, including the first five as Gloucestershire crashed to 22 for 5, left Gloucestershire Gladiators without any hope in the bottom-fight at New Road, Worcester. Akhtar's bowling analysis was the best in the National League all season. After Akhtar was taken off, Malinga Bandara and Mark Alleyne set about trying to bat out fifty overs, but Alleyne was caught by Worcestershire Royals' Vikram Solanki and Kabir Ali cleaned up the tail with two wickets as Gloucestershire were all out for 105. Bandara then got the wickets of Stephen Moore and Vikram Solanki with successive deliveries, but Chris Gayle guided the hosts home with an unbeaten 53 off 70 balls, as Worcestershire won with more than 20 overs to spare. (Cricinfo scorecard)

==== Table at 4 September ====
totesport League – Division One at 4 September 2005
Pos	Team	Pld	W	L	NR	Pts
1	Essex Eagles	13	10	1	2	44
2	Northamptonshire Steelbacks	14	7	6	2	32
3	Middlesex Crusaders	13	7	5	1	30
4	Glamorgan Dragons	13	5	4	4	28
5	Worcestershire Royals	13	5	7	1	22
6	Lancashire Lightning	13	5	7	1	22
7	Hampshire Hawks	13	5	7	1	22
8	Gloucestershire Gladiators	14	5	8	1	22
9	Nottinghamshire Outlaws	13	3	7	3	18

=== Matches of 5–9 September ===
==== Hampshire v Middlesex (5 September) ====
Middlesex (4pts) beat Hampshire (0pts) by two wickets

Two days after their win in the C&G Trophy Final, Hampshire Hawks were defeated by Middlesex Crusaders, to move closer to relegation in the National League. They were put in to bat, and lost wicket-keeper Nic Pothas for 5 early on, but John Crawley and Sean Ervine fought back with a 101-run partnership for the second wicket. The Middlesex bowlers frequently interrupted with wickets, though, and Crawley failed to hit the ball hard enough to end with only six fours in his 122-ball 92. Hampshire closed on 227 for 6, with five Middlesex bowler. Middlesex lost Paul Weekes in the first over, but a blistering 139-run stand between Owais Shah and Jamie Dalrymple turned the match around. Despite three wickets each from Hampshire's Chris Tremlett and Greg Lamb, Middlesex' Chris Peploe held his head calm, and with 14 not out he guided Middlesex to a two-wicket victory with 11 balls to spare. (Cricinfo scorecard)

==== Essex v Lancashire (7 September) ====
Essex (4pts) beat Lancashire (0pts) by 55 runs

Dutch–South African Ryan ten Doeschate hammered a career-best 89 not out as Essex Eagles powered their way to 273 for 6 at Chelmsford. His innings included five sixes and four fours, as Sajid Mahmood was the main recipient of his boundary-hitting – ending with figures of two for 67 in nine overs. England Under-19 player Tom Smith, who had taken 15 Test wickets in three U-19 matches with Sri Lanka, proved that the gap between Under-19 cricket and List A cricket is huge, as he finished with 42 off his five overs. When Lancashire Lightning batted, Darren Gough got an early wicket of Iain Sutcliffe, and despite scores in the 30s from Andrew Crook and Mal Loye, Lancashire lost their first four wickets for 91 runs. Andrew Symonds rebuilt with Mark Chilton, but once Symonds was bowled by Gough – who ended with four for 31 – there was nowhere to hide for Lancashire. Kyle Hogg blitzed his way to 36, lifting Lancashire to 218, but they still suffered a comprehensive loss. (Cricinfo scorecard)

==== Nottinghamshire v Gloucestershire (9 September) ====
Nottinghamshire (4pts) beat Gloucestershire (0pts) by one wicket

The relegation battle in the National League tightened further, as the match at Trent Bridge became a low-scoring thriller, where Gloucestershire Gladiators failed to put away two good positions – first they collapsed from 75 for 2 to make 116, then they allowed Nottinghamshire to hit 19 for the last wicket. They were put in to bat by Nottinghamshire Outlaws and after losing Kadeer Ali and Ramnaresh Sarwan for ducks, Steve Adshead and Craig Spearman rebuilt with a 60-run third-wicket stand. Mark Ealham and Gareth Clough shared the last seven wickets, however, after Ryan Sidebottom had bowled Spearman for 18, and Gloucestershire were all out for 116. James Averis then took four wickets for the Gladiators, as Nottinghamshire lost their first five wickets for 32 runs, but Anurag Singh and Mark Ealham put them back on track by adding 30 for the sixth wicket. Jon Lewis broke through their defences, however, shattering Ealham's stumps as he was bowled, and when Anurag Singh departed for 41, Nottinghamshire's task looked steep. They needed 19 for the last wicket with Ryan Sidebottom and Greg Smith batting – but Smith hit two fours as he ended with 16 not out to take Nottinghamshire to the victory. (Cricinfo scorecard)

==== Table at 9 September ====
totesport League – Division One at 9 September 2005
Pos	Team	Pld	W	L	NR	Pts
1	Essex Eagles	14	11	1	2	48
2	Middlesex Crusaders	14	8	5	1	34
3	Northamptonshire Steelbacks	14	7	6	2	32
4	Glamorgan Dragons	13	5	4	4	28
5	Nottinghamshire Outlaws	14	4	7	3	22
6	Worcestershire Royals	13	5	7	1	22
7	Lancashire Lightning	14	5	8	1	22
8	Hampshire Hawks	14	5	8	1	22
9	Gloucestershire Gladiators	15	5	9	1	22

=== Second week of September ===
==== Middlesex v Glamorgan (11 September) ====
Middlesex (4pts) beat Glamorgan (0pts) by five runs

Scott Styris redeemed some early expensive overs to come back and win the National League game for Middlesex Crusaders with his bowling. It was the Crusaders who batted first, though, against a Glamorgan Dragons side whose National League season had been their only light point after thirteen Championship defeats thus far. After Ed Smith departed for 6, fifties from Paul Weekes and Owais Shah sent Middlesex to 133 for 1. Dean Cosker took two quick wickets, but a late cameo from left-hander Ed Joyce saw Middlesex to a total of 239 for 5. Peter Trego then removed both openers, before Alex Wharf took him apart, and Trego ended with the strange bowling analysis of 4–1–31–2. Wharf was eventually caught by Smith, but David Hemp, Dan Cherry and Richard Grant forged good partnerships with Michael Powell, and Glamorgan looked good at 219 for 5. Styris had the last laugh, however, taking three wickets in the late overs as Glamorgan lost the last five men for 15 runs – bowling Glamorgan out with eight balls remaining in their quota and leaving Powell stranded on 83 not out. (Cricinfo scorecard)

==== Nottinghamshire v Worcestershire (11 September) ====
Nottinghamshire (4pts) beat Worcestershire (0pts) by five wickets

Despite little help from the rest of the batting line-up, Ben Smith with 58 and Steven Davies and 43 gave Worcestershire Royals a total of 200, after Nottinghamshire Outlaws' Ryan Sidebottom had bowled four maiden overs and limited the scoring. Worcestershire made it to 200 for 9, however, but with Stephen Fleming making 73 in his first match for Nottinghamshire following the tour of Zimbabwe with the New Zealand team, Nottinghamshire made it to the target with five wickets in hand, despite Kabir Ali and Ray Price taking two wickets each. (Cricinfo scorecard)

==== Glamorgan v Hampshire (13 September) ====
Glamorgan (4pts) beat Hampshire (0pts) by 151 runs

Glamorgan Dragons recorded a victory at their home ground Sophia Gardens, despite being tied down in mid-match by Sean Ervine and Shaun Udal who took two wickets each and both conceded less than 40 runs. Wicket-keeper Mark Wallace hit one six and one four in a valuable hit-out late on, while Michael Powell had set the pace with 52. Then, Hampshire Hawks were shot down in the chase. David Harrison had John Crawley caught with the second ball of the match, and Andrew Davies followed up, getting Greg Lamb and Ervine caught behind. With James Adams bowled by Harrison, Hampshire had scored seven runs for four wickets, and their lower order never recovered. Jono McLean was the first to hit into double figures, before he too was caught behind off Davies, and Harrison then took two as Hampshire were 33 for 7. Kevin Latouf and Shaun Udal adjusted somewhat, adding 19 for the eighth wicket, but first change bowler Alex Wharf cleaned up them as well, leaving Hampshire all out for 69 – the lowest score of the National League Division One all season, and giving Glamorgan the highest victory by runs in the division all season. (Cricinfo scorecard)

==== Table at 13 September ====
totesport League – Division One at 13 September 2005
Pos	Team	Pld	W	L	NR	Pts
1	Essex Eagles	14	11	1	2	48
2	Middlesex Crusaders	15	9	5	1	38
3	Northamptonshire Steelbacks	15	7	6	2	32
4	Glamorgan Dragons	15	6	5	4	32
5	Nottinghamshire Outlaws	15	5	7	3	26
6	Worcestershire Royals	14	5	8	1	22
7	Lancashire Lightning	14	5	8	1	22
8	Hampshire Hawks	15	5	9	1	22
9	Gloucestershire Gladiators	15	5	9	1	22

=== Third Sunday of September ===
==== Essex v Worcestershire (18 September) ====
Essex (4pts) beat Worcestershire (0pts) by four wickets

Essex Eagles continued on their winning ways with their twelfth National League victory of the season, taking a win in the last over thanks to a 78-run stand between Grant Flower and Ravinder Bopara. However, it was Worcestershire Royals who won the toss and batted first, Stephen Moore and Vikram Solanki (coming in for Chris Gayle who retired hurt) adding 103 for the first wicket. Gayle returned when Solanki was dismissed, hitting 44, and 25 from Ben Smith helped Worcestershire to 227 for 5. Andre Adams took three wickets as Worcestershire lost four for one solitary run, but Smith hung in there with number 11 Nadeem Malik and ensured a total of 240 for 9. Essex lost captain Ronnie Irani for nine early on, but a stroke-filled half-century from Alastair Cook sent Essex to 135 for 3, and Grant Flower then hit four sixes to complete a run-a-ball 81. Despite two late wickets from Kabir Ali, Bopara saw Essex home with five deliveries to spare to finish on 46 not out. (Cricinfo scorecard)

==== Lancashire v Middlesex (18 September) ====
Middlesex (4pts) beat Lancashire (0pts) by 44 runs

Middlesex Crusaders' middle-order batsman Jamie Dalrymple took the Lancashire Lightning bowlers on to hit 63 from 33 balls in the late overs of the match at Old Trafford, as the Lightning were sent into the relegation zone in Division One. Middlesex batted first, with Paul Weekes and Ed Smith adding 90 for the first wicket, before Murali Kartik broke through thrice – ending with three for 43. Owais Shah and Dalrymple added 76 for the fourth wicket, however, hitting 21 boundaries on their way to half-centuries, and Middlesex posted a total of 263 for 4. Mal Loye swatted two sixes and a four before being caught by Dalrymple for 19, who took four catches in the Lancashire innings – including one off his own bowling. The Lightning fell to 94 for 5, with four Middlesex bowlers getting one wicket each, and despite all-rounder Glen Chapple recording his first one-day half-century of the season with 71, and they were bowled out for 219 an over before the end. (Cricinfo scorecard)

==== Table at 18 September ====
totesport League – Division One at 18 September 2005
Pos	Team	Pld	W	L	NR	Pts
1	Essex Eagles	15	12	1	2	52
2	Middlesex Crusaders	16	10	5	1	42
3	Northamptonshire Steelbacks	15	7	6	2	32
4	Glamorgan Dragons	15	6	5	4	32
5	Nottinghamshire Outlaws	15	5	7	3	26
6	Worcestershire Royals	15	5	9	1	22
7	Lancashire Lightning	15	5	9	1	22
8	Hampshire Hawks	15	5	9	1	22
9	Gloucestershire Gladiators	15	5	9	1	22

=== Final round ===
==== Gloucestershire v Glamorgan (25 September) ====
Gloucestershire (4pts) beat Glamorgan (0pts) by three wickets

Gloucestershire Gladiators made it past Glamorgan Dragons to take a victory in their final game of the season, but they were still relegated into Division Two, thus suffering relegation in both forms of cricket. Winning the toss and bowling first, Gloucestershire's spinners Malinga Bandara and Mark Hardinges shared four for 87 in their 18 overs after the opening bowlers Jon Lewis and James Averis went wicketless. Gloucestershire did concede 32 extras, however, as Glamorgan assembled 262 for 8. Steve Adshead and Kadeer Ali added 86 for Gloucestershire's first wicket, before Craig Spearman took on the Gloucestershire bowlers to hit 80 off 71 balls. Despite his dismissal to send the score to 228 for 6, Bandara, Lewis and Mark Alleyne added the required runs, as Gloucestershire won with 14 balls to spare. (Cricinfo scorecard)

==== Hampshire v Nottinghamshire (25 September) ====
Nottinghamshire (4pts) beat Hampshire (0pts) by 37 runs on the Duckworth–Lewis method

Hampshire Hawks were defeated by Nottinghamshire, in particular David Hussey and Ryan Sidebottom, to go down into Division Two in front of their home crowd. The visiting Nottinghamshire Outlaws batted first, and after a slow start where Anurag Singh and Stephen Fleming had accumulated forties to see them to 101 for 3, Hussey hit loose. He hit five sixes in a 53-ball 75 which, together with 26 off 13 balls from Mark Ealham, took Nottinghamshire to 248 for 5. Then rain intervened, cutting 25 overs off the Hampshire effort. When they came back to bat, Hampshire were set 165 to win – and duly lost six wickets for 58 runs, Gareth Clough having two men bowled and captain Shane Warne lbw. Jono McLean hit 36 from number eight, but Hampshire were still taken out for 127 a ball before the end – Ryan Sidebottom finishing them off by having Billy Taylor caught for 0. Sidebottom thus finished with three for 13 from 23 balls. (Cricinfo scorecard)

==== Northamptonshire v Essex (25 September) ====
Essex (4pts) beat Northamptonshire (0pts) by seven wickets

Essex Eagles took their thirteenth win in sixteen matches to round off their one-day season and end with a 16-point victory overall. Their bowlers built the foundation for this victory, as all seven bowlers to be used got at least one wicket, and despite half-centuries from Australians Martin Love and Damien Wright Northamptonshire Steelbacks were bowled out for 208. Wright then took two wickets to set Essex back to 22 for 2, but Alastair Cook then followed his 117 not out against Worcestershire in the County Championship earlier on in the week. His 110-ball 94 – a career best List A score, improving his previous best by 32 runs – was part of a 168-run stand with Grant Flower, which took Essex to the brink, with 190 for 3. Flower then hit the remaining 19 runs with Ravinder Bopara, and Essex won with seven wickets and 25 balls in hand. (Cricinfo scorecard)

==== Worcestershire v Lancashire (25 September) ====
Lancashire (4pts) beat Worcestershire (0pts) by 75 runs

Lancashire Lightning ensured continued survival in Division One of the National League with a victory over Worcestershire Royals in a rain-shortened match that was cut down from 45 to 33 overs. David Leatherdale and Gareth Batty took early wickets, as Lancashire lost their first four wickets for 65 runs, but Glen Chapple and Stuart Law added 84 for the fifth wicket, and Kyle Hogg also provided quick runs as Lancashire ended on 186 for 8. The six Lancashire bowlers then shared out wickets, as James Anderson ended with three for 12 including England batsman Vikram Solanki, while spinners Murali Kartik and Andrew Symonds took two each as Worcestershire were bowled out for 111. No Worcestershire batsman passed 25, and thus Worcestershire fell down into Division Two. (Cricinfo scorecard)

==== Final table ====
2005 totesport League – Division One
Pos	Team	Pld	W	L	NR	Pts
1	Essex Eagles	16	13	1	2	56
2	Middlesex Crusaders	16	10	5	1	42
3	Northamptonshire Steelbacks	16	7	7	2	32
4	Glamorgan Dragons	16	6	6	4	32
5	Nottinghamshire Outlaws	16	6	7	3	30
6	Lancashire Lightning	16	6	9	1	26
7	Gloucestershire Gladiators	16	6	9	1	26
8	Worcestershire Royals	16	5	10	1	22
9	Hampshire Hawks	16	5	10	1	22
