= Jason Brown (cricketer) =

English cricketer (born 1974)

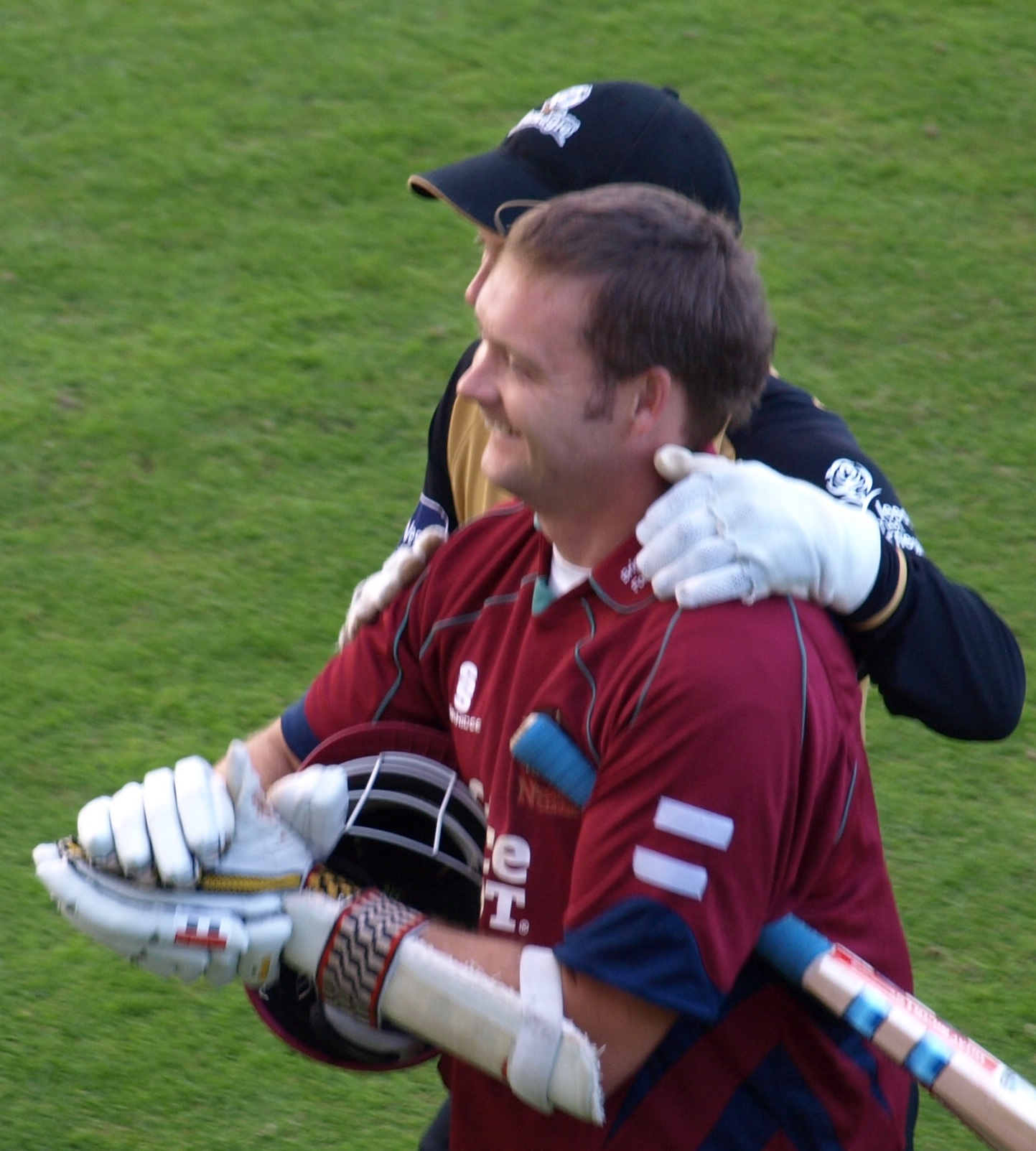

Personal information
- Full name: Jason Fred Brown
- Born: 10 October 1974 (age 52); Newcastle-under-Lyme, England
- Nickname: Cheese
- Height: 6 ft 0 in (1.83 m)
- Batting: Right-handed
- Bowling: Right arm Offbreak
- Role: Bowler

Domestic team information
- Years: Team
- 1996–2008: Northamptonshire (squad no. 8)
- 2009: Nottinghamshire

Career statistics
| Competition | FC | LA | T20 |
|---|---|---|---|
| Matches | 130 | 159 | 43 |
| Runs scored | 655 | 146 | 23 |
| Batting average | 7.44 | 6.34 | 23.00 |
| 100s/50s | 0/0 | 0/0 | 0/0 |
| Top score | 38 | 16 | 13* |
| Balls bowled | 31,146 | 7,454 | 1,057 |
| Wickets | 414 | 139 | 41 |
| Bowling average | 33.91 | 39.17 | 25.78 |
| 5 wickets in innings | 22 | 1 | 1 |
| 10 wickets in match | 5 | 0 | 0 |
| Best bowling | 7/69 | 5/19 | 5/27 |
| Catches/stumpings | 26/– | 29/– | 11/– |

Jason Fred Brown (born 10 October 1974) is a cricketer who has previously played for Northamptonshire, Nottinghamshire, England A and Staffordshire.

== Career ==
Jason Brown made his first-class debut for Northamptonshire against Yorkshire at the County Cricket Ground, Northampton in September 1996. Up to the end of the 2008 season, he had played 126 first-class matches for Northamptonshire as well as three matches for the England A team during their tour of the West Indies in January 2001. He also played on the senior England team's tour of Sri Lanka in 2000–01.

In these 129 matches, Brown has taken 414 wickets, with 22 instances of taking 5 wickets in an innings. His career best bowling was 7–69 against Durham at the Riverside Ground in 2003. He was released by Northamptonshire at the end of the 2008 season, and subsequently joined Nottinghamshire on a two-year contract.

However, injuries limited his playing time at Nottinghamshire and he was released after just one year, ironically after Nottinghamshire signed Graeme White, another spinner from Northamptonshire.
