= Bilal Shafayat =

English cricketer

Personal information
- Full name: Bilal Mustapha Shafayat
- Born: 10 July 1984 (age 42); Nottingham, Nottinghamshire, England
- Nickname: Billy
- Height: 5 ft 7 in (1.70 m)
- Batting: Right-handed
- Bowling: Right-arm medium
- Role: Occasional wicket-keeper
- Relatives: Rashid Shafayat (brother)

Domestic team information
- Years: Team
- 2000–2001: Nottinghamshire Cricket Board
- 2001–2004: Nottinghamshire
- 2004/05: National Bank of Pakistan
- 2005–2006: Northamptonshire
- 2007–2010: Nottinghamshire
- 2007/08–2008/09: Pakistan Customs
- 2010/11–2011/12: Habib Bank Limited
- 2012: Shropshire
- 2012: Hampshire

Career statistics
Competition	FC	LA	T20
Matches	135	107	50
Runs scored	6,463	2,027	536
Batting average	29.92	38.12	15.76
100s/50s	10/35	1/7	0/0
Top score	161	104	101*
Balls bowled	956	790	126
Wickets	8	24	4
Bowling average	81.00	30.41	49.75
5 wickets in innings	0	0	0
10 wickets in match	0	0	0
Best bowling	2/25	4/33	2/13
Catches/stumpings	118/8	40/5	15/1
- Source: Cricinfo, 16 July 2012

Bilal Mustapha Shafayat (born 10 July 1984) is an English former first-class cricketer. He played as a middle-order batsman, bowler and wicket-keeper. Shafayat was a former captain of the England under-19 side.

== Early life and family ==
Shafayat was born in Nottingham to parents of Pakistani ancestry. He was educated at the Nottingham Bluecoat School, but left after he found a place in cricket.

== Career ==
He started his career at Nottinghamshire but moved to Northamptonshire in 2005. One early highlight of his career was a catch made for England as a substitute fielder in a Test against New Zealand in 2004. He returned to Nottinghamshire for the 2007 season.

He was the twelfth man in the 2009 Cardiff Test against Australia. He was the focus of a controversy when he came out twice during the final overs of the match as the last pair of England batsmen were trying to save the match. The Australian captain accused the England team of time-wasting.

He was released by Nottinghamshire after the 2010 season. He played domestic First Class cricket in Pakistan in 2010/2011. He played second eleven cricket for Hampshire at the start of 2011 and averaged 239.5 in his two matches before returning to Northamptonshire on a match-by-match basis during the 2011 season, playing for the Second XI and the first team in Twenty20 and List A matches during June and July 2011. He ended the season playing for Wellington in the Birmingham league. In April 2012 he joined Shropshire. In May 2012 he was registered by Hampshire and went on to sign for them for 2013 season.
