= Johann Louw =

South African cricketer (born 1979)

Personal information
- Born: 12 April 1979 (age 47); Cape Town, South Africa
- Batting: Right-handed
- Bowling: Right-arm medium-fast
- Role: Bowler

International information
- National side: South Africa
- ODI debut (cap 92): 2 November 2008 v Kenya
- Last ODI: 9 November 2008 v Bangladesh

Domestic team information
- Years: Team
- 2000/01–2003/03: Griqualand West
- 2003/04: Eastern Province
- 2004/05: Dolphins
- 2004–2005: Northamptonshire
- 2005/06: Eagles
- 2006: Middlesex
- 2005/06–2009/10: Dolphins
- 2008–2009: Northamptonshire

Career statistics
Competition	ODI	T20I	FC	LA
Matches	3	2	115	129
Runs scored	23	1	3,082	1,322
Batting average	23.00	–	22.33	17.86
100s/50s	0/0	0/0	1/15	0/3
Top score	23	1*	124	72
Balls bowled	156	42	20,298	5,932
Wickets	2	2	329	182
Bowling average	74.00	27.00	31.74	26.51
5 wickets in innings	0	0	12	4
10 wickets in match	0	0	2	0
Best bowling	1/45	2/36	6/39	5/27
Catches/stumpings	0/–	0/–	37/–	16/–
- Source: CricketArchive, 5 December 2009

Johann Louw (born 12 April 1979) is a South African cricketer.

Louw was born in Cape Town, Cape Province. He is a right-arm medium-fast bowler who has represented Griqualand West, Eastern Province, Northamptonshire, Dolphins, Eagles and Middlesex. Louw is a bowling all-rounder and is a noted one-day cricketer with the ability to finish an innings with bat and ball.

Louw made his international debut in a Twenty20 International against Kenya in Kimberley on 2 November 2008.
