= Paul Weekes =

English cricketer

Personal information
- Full name: Paul Nicholas Weekes
- Born: 8 July 1969 (age 57); Hackney, London, England
- Height: 5 ft 10 in (1.78 m)
- Batting: Left-handed
- Bowling: Right-arm off break

Domestic team information
- Years: Team
- 1990–2006: Middlesex (squad no. 9)

Career statistics
Competition	FC	LA	T20
Matches	236	323	23
Runs scored	11,060	7,632	516
Batting average	34.88	30.77	30.35
100s/50s	20/55	9/46	0/2
Top score	171*	143*	56
Balls bowled	25,909	11,968	390
Wickets	304	329	10
Bowling average	41.97	29.23	52.70
5 wickets in innings	5	0	0
10 wickets in match	0	0	0
Best bowling	8/39	4/17	3/29
Catches/stumpings	210/–	138/–	5/–
- Source: CricketArchive, 2 September 2012

Paul Nicholas Weekes (born 8 July 1969) is an English former cricketer. He is a left-handed batsman and a right-arm offspin bowler.

Born in Hackney, Weekes made his first-class debut for Middlesex in 1990. He is the only English cricketer to have scored more than 150 runs in both innings of a first-class game. He has twice made over 1,000 runs in 1996 and 2004. He helped Middlesex finish the 2005 National League as runners-up to Essex.

He retired from first-class cricket following Middlesex's relegation at the end of the 2006 county season, having stated his desire to play regular first team cricket earlier in the season. He finished his career with a first-class batting average of 34.88 and a first-class bowling average of 41.97, with 304 wickets to his name.

He plays club cricket for Hornsey Cricket Club and has been a key part of the Hackney Community College Cricket Academy coaching team since 2002. Weekes also coaches twice a week at Westminster School and at Belmont Mill Hill Preparatory School in the summer term. He also coaches the women's teams at Hampstead Cricket Club.
