= Usman Afzaal =

English cricketer (born 1977)

Personal information
- Full name: Usman Afzaal
- Born: 9 June 1977 (age 49); Rawalpindi, Punjab, Pakistan
- Nickname: Uz, Uzi, A-Star, Zaf-Zaf
- Height: 6 ft 0 in (1.83 m)
- Batting: Left-handed
- Bowling: Slow left arm orthodox
- Role: All-rounder
- Relatives: Kamran Afzaal (brother); Aquib Afzaal (brother); Fawad Alam (cousin)

International information
- National side: England
- Test debut (cap 605): 5 July 2001 v Australia
- Last Test: 2 August 2001 v Australia

Domestic team information
- Years: Team
- 1995–2003: Nottinghamshire
- 2004–2007: Northamptonshire
- 2008–2010: Surrey

Career statistics
Competition	Test	FC	LA	T20
Matches	3	235	190	52
Runs scored	83	14,055	5,491	942
Batting average	16.60	39.15	35.88	22.42
100s/50s	0/1	32/74	6/34	0/4
Top score	54	204*	132	98*
Balls bowled	54	9,089	1,602	195
Wickets	1	98	59	8
Bowling average	49.00	51.81	26.55	32.75
5 wickets in innings	0	0	0	0
10 wickets in match	0	0	0	0
Best bowling	1/49	4/101	4/49	2/15
Catches/stumpings	0/–	104/–	53/–	6/–
- Source: CricketArchive, 12 August 2013

Usman Afzaal (born 9 June 1977) is an English cricketer who played three Test matches for England, all against Australia in 2001. He is a left-handed middle order batsman and occasional left arm slow bowler.

== Domestic career ==
He started his first-class career with Nottinghamshire, and was awarded the NBC Denis Compton Award in 1996, but left the county after the 2003 season to play for Northamptonshire. Towards the end of 2007 season he left Northamptonshire and signed a three-year contract with Surrey.

== Personal life ==
=== Relationships and family ===
From the early 2000s to the mid-2000s he was in a relationship with Indian actress Amrita Arora.

His brother Aquib Afzaal has been a cricketer as well an actor, having a lead role in the Bollywood dance film Let's Dance (2009).

=== Business interests ===
From 2013 to 2015, he owned an Indian restaurant opposite Trent Bridge.
