= Damien Wright =

Australian cricketer (born 1975)

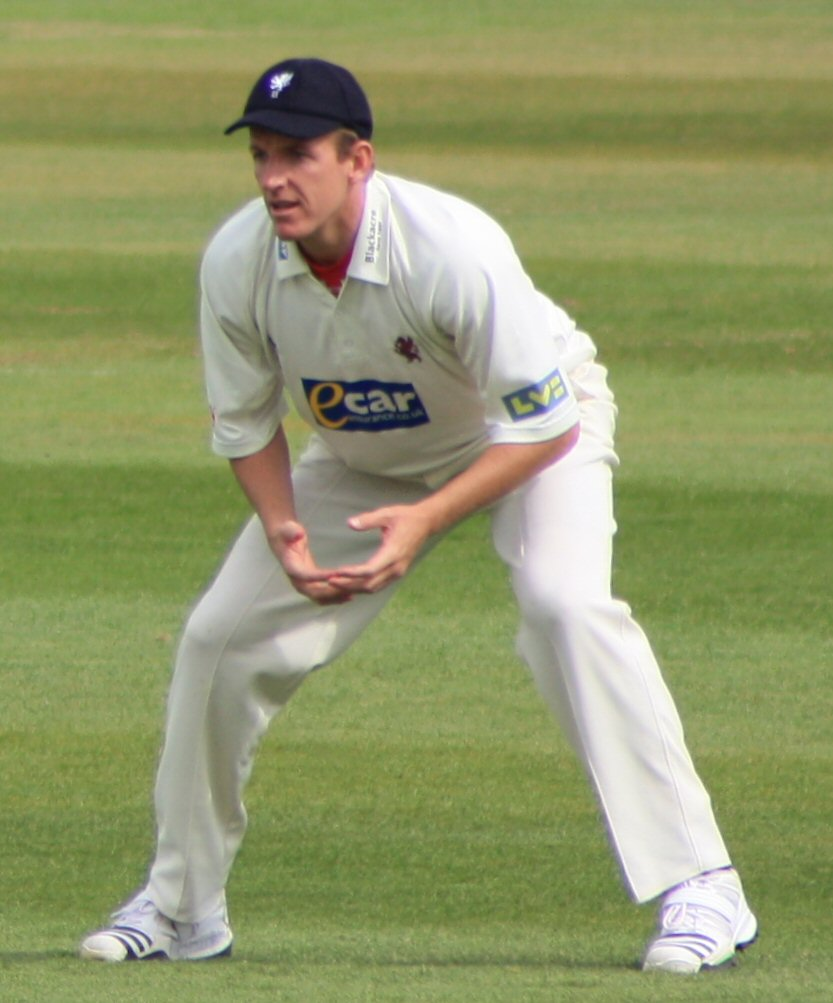

Personal information
- Full name: Damien Geoffrey Wright
- Born: 25 July 1975 (age 51); Casino, New South Wales, Australia
- Nickname: Moves
- Height: 1.87 m (6 ft 2 in)
- Batting: Right-handed
- Bowling: Right-arm fast-medium
- Role: All-rounder

Domestic team information
- Years: Team
- 1997/98–2006/07: Tasmania
- 2001: Scotland (domestic only)
- 2003–2005: Northamptonshire (squad no. 29)
- 2007: Glamorgan
- 2008/09–2010/11: Victoria (squad no. 3)
- 2009: Sussex
- 2010: Somerset (squad no. 20)
- 2010/11: Wellington
- 2011: Worcestershire

Career statistics
Competition	FC	LA	T20
Matches	123	106	26
Runs scored	3,824	930	195
Batting average	23.46	16.60	15.00
100s/50s	1/20	0/4	0/0
Top score	111	55	38*
Balls bowled	25,465	5,405	494
Wickets	406	130	20
Bowling average	28.68	29.14	30.75
5 wickets in innings	16	1	0
10 wickets in match	0	0	0
Best bowling	8/60	5/37	3/17
Catches/stumpings	57/–	23/–	5/–
- Source: ESPNcricinfo, 18 July 2020

Damien Geoffrey Wright (born 25 July 1975) is an Australian cricket coach and former first-class cricketer who coached Hobart Hurricanes cricket team. Wright made his debut for Tasmania in 1997, playing with the team until switching to Victoria for the 2008–09 season. In 2002 he played in the Scottish cricket team as their one permitted overseas player—he also had previous spells in county cricket with Northamptonshire, Glamorgan and Somerset. He is a right-handed batsman and right-arm fast-medium bowler. He has a side-on bowling action and an ability to bounce the ball sharply. Wright started Coaching the Hobart Hurricanes in the Big Bash League 03 in 2013–14, he coached the team to defeat the Melbourne Stars, who were undefeated in the tournament until then. The Hurricanes then lost the final to the Perth Scorchers. Wright then coached the Hurricanes to the semi-finals in the Champions League T20 2014 in India.

== Career highlights ==
=== Early career ===
Born in Casino, New South Wales, Wright moved to Tasmania in 1997–98. He made his first-class debut for Tasmania on 15 October 1997 against South Australia, claiming a wicket in each innings and scoring 19 runs in the first-innings. His one-day debut came four days later against the same opposition, and Wright took three wickets after opening the bowling. He made four further appearances during his debut season, and finished the summer with five first-class wickets at a bowling average of 56.40, and five List A wickets at an average of 20.20. In 1998–99, playing for the Australian Cricket Academy against New Zealand Academy, Wright claimed five wickets in an innings as the Australian side won after having earlier being forced by their opponents to follow-on. He only made two appearances for the Tasmanian first-team, both in the Pura Cup during March, and took three wickets.

The 1999–2000 season saw a sharp increase in the amount of cricket Wright played; he appeared in all six of the state's Mercantile Mutual Cup matches, and seven of their ten Pura Cup matches. He began the season with an economical three wickets in the opening one-day match against South Australia, Wickets came steadily, but not prolifically through the rest of the season. He twice claimed three wickets in an innings, against Queensland in November, and Victoria in March. In total, he took 17 first-class wickets at 48.05, and ten one-day wickets at 20.50, both at least doubling his career totals. The following season saw Wright play slightly more one-day cricket, but slightly less first-class cricket. After playing in four of Tasmania's opening five Pura Cup matches, Wright did not appear in the competition again until the final two matches of Tasmania's campaign. Of his 22 first-class wickets in the season, 12 came in the last two matches, with Wright taking four wickets in an innings in both of the matches, against Western Australia and South Australia. His first-class wickets in the season came at an average of 26.95, significantly better than he had managed in previous seasons. In one-day competition, he returned nine wickets, including three wickets in a match Queensland.

He spent the Australian winter playing club cricket in Scotland, where he helped Grange Cricket Club reach the final of the Scottish Cup. He also represented Scotland in two Cheltenham & Gloucester Trophy matches. In the first-round match, he made his first half-century in List A cricket, scoring 55 after opening the batting. He made another half-century in the second-round match, and was named as man of the match as Scotland completed a ten-wicket win with Wright remaining 53 not out.

=== First-team regular ===
The 2001–02 season saw Wright become a regular member of both Tasmania's first-class and one-day sides, playing all of their matches in both formats of the game. Wright continued to show an improvement with the bat, averaging 34.08 in the Pura Cup, making four half-centuries. The first of these—his maiden first-class half-century—came in Tasmania's opening Pura Cup match of the season, when he scored 50 exactly before being trapped leg before wicket in a high scoring draw. In his next match, Wright was named man of the match after taking two wickets and conceding only 22 runs in his ten overs, helping to restrict Western Australia to 195 to set up a five-wicket victory for his state. Wright finished with identical figures in his following one-day match against the same opponents, but Western Australia secured victory thanks to a century from Michael Hussey.

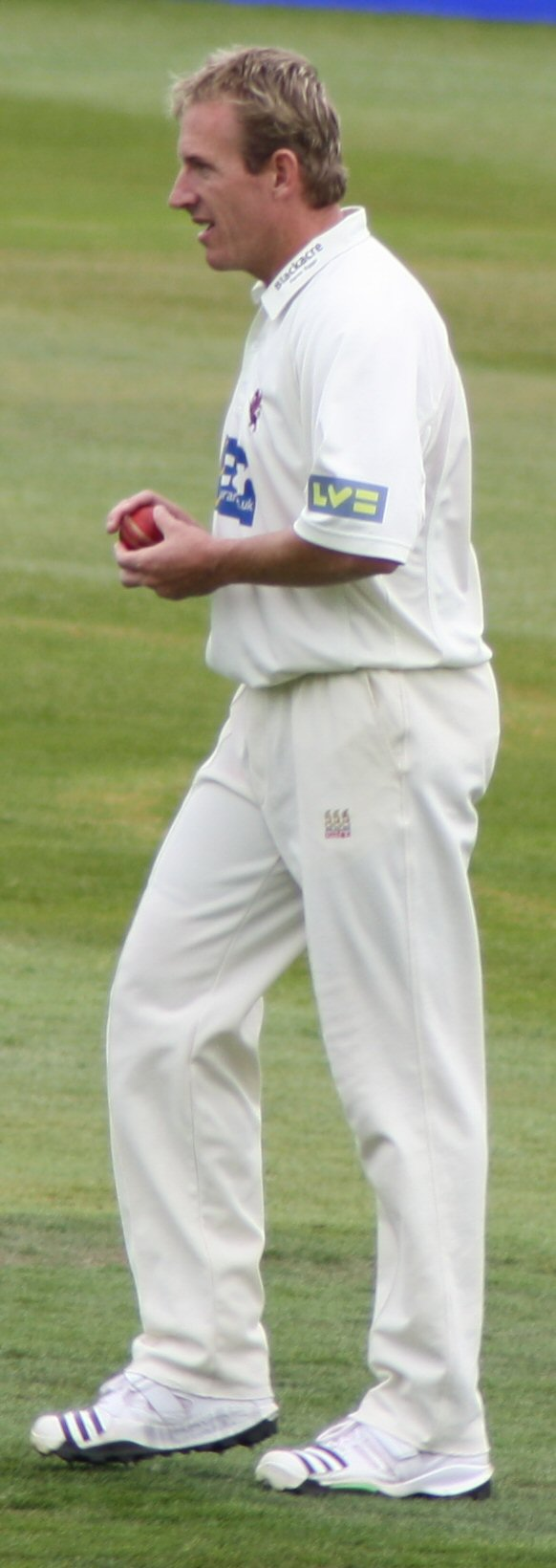
Preparing to bowl for Somerset

He was selected to play for the Prime Minister's XI against New Zealand in a 50-over contest, and claimed the solitary wicket of Mathew Sinclair and conceded 51 runs in his nine overs. Later in the season, he helped his team to an innings victory over Western Australia in the Pura Cup thanks to a first-innings score of 63 with the bat, and two wickets in each of the following innings as Tasmania forced their opponents to follow-on. In Tasmania's final one-day match of the season, Wright was named man of the match—despite his side being defeated by 19 runs—for his return of four wickets while conceding 23 runs, and top-scoring for Tasmania with 40 runs off 36 balls. In the remaining three Pura Cup group matches that season, he claimed six wickets, and scored 48, 55 and 13 as Tasmania drew one match and won both the others to qualify for the final against Queensland. Prior to the final, Wright was suffering with a thigh strain, and was only passed fit to play on the morning before the match. Although cleared to play, he did not open the bowling for Tasmania, instead playing as second-change bowler, and finished with figures of 1/60 and 0/39 as Queensland clinched the title by 235 runs.

Wright toured South Africa in September 2002 with the Australia A side, playing three 50 over matches against South Africa A. He only managed to take one wicket during the series, that of Loots Bosman in his final match. He batted in all three matches, remaining not out on each occasion, with a 26-ball score of 24* in the first match being his highest score of the tour. The beginning of the 2002–03 season saw Wright fail to make significant impact with either bat or ball until the fifth match of the season, when he claimed three wickets in the second-innings against Queensland. He followed this up with another three wickets in the first-innings of the next match, against New South Wales, and achieved his maiden first-class five-wicket haul by taking six wickets in the second-innings of the same game. He was unable to replicate his wicket-taking form in the shorter form of the game, failing to take more than one wicket in a match until late January. Despite this, his bowling stifled the opponent batsmen; he was awarded man of the match for restricting New South Wales to just 17 runs off his ten overs in a tied match, and finished the season as the ING Cup's second most economical bowler behind Glenn McGrath, and the most economical of those who had bowled over 100 balls. In the Pura Cup, he was Tasmania's leading bowler with 31 wickets, ranking him as the seventh highest wicket-taker among all teams. At the close of the 2002–03 season, Wright was selected again to play for Australia A, as they hosted South Africa A. In three 50-over matches, he claimed three wickets, but was more impressive in the three-day match, in which he claimed seven wickets in a draw.

In 2003, Wright played a few games for Northamptonshire, playing two County Championship matches, and four one-day games, two of which came against the touring Pakistanis and South Africans. Returning to Australia for the following season, Wright enjoyed success in his early season first-class games, claiming match figures of 5/117, 7/136 and 7/63 as Tasmania won two and drew of their first three Pura Cup matches of the summer. In December of that season, he was selected to play for the Australia A side in a three-day match against India, and claimed a wicket in each innings of the drawn match. He performed well in the back-to-back matches against South Australia in January, taking 4/51 in the ING Cup defeat, and then claimed his second five-wicket haul in the Pura Cup match, taking 5/43 in the second-innings to help Tasmania win by 213 runs. He followed this up with three wickets in each innings against Queensland, In the final three matches of the season, Wright failed to continue his wicket-taking form, and claimed three wickets between them, to finish the season with 37 Pura Cup wickets, the second-most in the competition.

=== Later career ===
His prolific season in 2004–05 drew the attention of English county sides and he moved to Northamptonshire for the following English summer, however a stress fracture to his back cut his overseas experience short, and has limited his availability for Tasmania as well. He signed with Somerset for the first four weeks of the 2010 season, while their main overseas player, Murali Kartik was playing in the IPL. He played for the Wellington Firebirds in their 20/20 HRV cup in New Zealand, (2010)

== Coaching career ==
After a stint as a bowling coach for New Zealand, Damien returned to Melbourne to coach the Melbourne Stars in 2012 then got an offer from Hobart to be the coach of the Hobart Hurricanes in 2013.

In 2018, Wright was appointed Head Coach of the Bangladesh under-19 team and led his side in the U-19 World Cup.

In March 2021, Wright was appointed as the bowling coach of Punjab Kings ahead of IPL 2021.
