= Greg Smith (cricketer, born 1971) =

English-South African cricketer

Greg Smith (born 30 October 1971) is an English-South African former cricketer. He played as a right-handed batsman and a left-arm medium-fast bowler.

Born in Pretoria, but with dual-nationality through his English father, Smith made his Nottinghamshire debut in 2001. In 2005 he aided Nottinghamshire towards the County Championship, taking 51 wickets.
