= 2002 County Championship =

English cricket tournament

- Tournament logo
- Dates: 2 April – 21 September 2002
- Administrator: England and Wales Cricket Board
- Cricket format: First-class cricket (4 days)
- Tournament format: League system
- Champions: Surrey (18th title)
- Participants: 18
- Matches: 144
- Most runs: Ian Ward (1,708 for Surrey)
- Most wickets: Kevin Dean (80 for Derbyshire)

The 2002 County Championship season, known as the Frizzell County Championship for sponsorship reasons, was contested through two divisions: Division One and Division Two. Each team plays all the others in their division both home and away. The top three teams from Division Two were promoted to the first division for 2003, while the bottom three teams from Division 1 are relegated.

== Teams ==
=== Division One ===
Team promoted from Division Two

Team	Primary home ground	Other grounds	Captain
Hampshire	Rose Bowl, Southampton	—	(England) Robin Smith
Kent	St Lawrence Ground, Canterbury	Nevill Ground, Tunbridge Wells; Mote Park, Maidstone	(England) David Fulton
Lancashire	Old Trafford, Manchester	Trafalgar Road Ground, Southport	(England) Warren Hegg
Leicestershire	Grace Road, Leicester	—	(England) Vince Wells
Somerset	County Ground, Taunton	Recreation Ground, Bath	(Australia) Jamie Cox
Surrey	The Oval, London	Woodbridge Road, Guildford	(England) Adam Hollioake
Sussex	County Ground, Hove	Arundel Castle Cricket Ground, Arundel	(England) Chris Adams
Warwickshire	Edgbaston, Birmingham	—	(England) Mike Powell
Yorkshire	Headingley, Leeds	North Marine Road Ground, Scarborough	(Australia) Darren Lehmann

=== Division Two ===
Team relegated from Division One

Team	Primary home ground	Other grounds	Captain
Derbyshire	County Ground, Derby	—	(England) Dominic Cork
Durham	Riverside Ground, Chester-le-Street	Feethams, Darlington	(England) Jonathan Lewis
Essex	County Ground, Chelmsford	Valentines Park, Ilford; Southchurch Park, Southend-on-Sea; Castle Park Cricket Ground, Colchester	(England) Ronnie Irani
Glamorgan	Sophia Gardens, Cardiff	St Helen's, Swansea; Colwyn Bay Cricket Club Ground	(England) Steve James
Gloucestershire	County Ground, Bristol	Archdeacon Meadow, Gloucester; College Ground, Cheltenham	(England) Mark Alleyne
Middlesex	Lord's, London	John Walker's Ground, Southgate	(England) Angus Fraser
Northamptonshire	County Ground, Northampton	—	(Australia) Michael Hussey
Nottinghamshire	Trent Bridge, Nottingham	—	(England) Jason Gallian
Worcestershire	County Ground, New Road, Worcester	Chester Road North Ground, Kidderminster	(England) Graeme Hick

== Standings ==
Teams receive 12 points for a win, 6 for a tie and 4 for a draw. Bonus points (a maximum of 5 batting points and 3 bowling points) may be scored during the first 130 overs of each team's first innings.

=== Division One ===
Team	Pld	W	L	T	D	A	Bat	Bowl	Ded	Pts
Surrey (C)	16	10	2	0	4	0	59	48	0.25	242.75
Warwickshire	16	7	2	0	7	0	42	44	0	198
Kent	16	7	4	0	5	0	48	44	0.5	195.50
Lancashire	16	6	4	0	6	0	33	43	0	172
Leicestershire	16	5	5	0	6	0	42	46	1.00	171
Sussex	16	3	6	0	7	0	43	47	0	154
Hampshire (R)	16	2	5	0	9	0	35	44	8.00	131
Somerset (R)	16	1	7	0	8	0	39	44	0.25	126.75
Yorkshire (R)	16	2	8	0	6	0	35	45	3.25	124.75

=== Division Two ===
Team	Pld	W	L	T	D	A	Bat	Bowl	Ded	Pts
Essex (C)	16	10	3	0	3	0	42	46	1.00	219
Middlesex (P)	16	7	3	0	6	0	61	43	0.25	211.75
Nottinghamshire (P)	16	8	5	0	3	0	47	48	1.75	201.25
Worcestershire	16	7	4	0	5	0	53	43	0	200
Glamorgan	16	5	5	0	6	0	41	44	0	169
Derbyshire	16	7	7	0	2	0	37	48	9.25	167.75
Northamptonshire	16	5	7	0	4	0	46	41	0.50	162.50
Gloucestershire	16	2	7	0	7	0	42	44	1.50	136.50
Durham	16	1	11	0	4	0	21	42	0.25	90.75

== Results ==
=== Division One ===
	Hampshire	Kent	Lancashire	Leicestershire	Somerset	Surrey	Sussex	Warwickshire	Yorkshire
Hampshire		Hampshire; 8 wickets	Lancashire; 111 runs	Leicestershire inns & 9 runs	Hampshire; 4 wickets	Surrey; 123 runs	Match drawn	Match drawn	Yorkshire; 7 wickets
Kent	Match drawn		Kent; 6 wickets	Match drawn	Kent; 153 runs	Surrey; 2 wickets	Kent; 4 wickets	Match drawn	Kent; 4 wickets
Lancashire	Match drawn	Kent; 6 wickets		Lancashire; 1 wicket	Lancashire; 336 runs	Match drawn	Match drawn	Match drawn	Yorkshire; 150 runs
Leicestershire	Match drawn	Kent; 6 wickets	Match drawn		Leicestershire inns & 18 runs	Surrey; 7 wickets	Leicestershire; 8 wickets	Leicestershire; 7 wickets	Leicestershire; 5 wickets
Somerset	Match drawn	Match drawn	Lancashire; 8 wickets	Match drawn		Match drawn	Sussex inns & 1 run	Match drawn	Somerset; 7 wickets
Surrey	Surrey inns & 60 runs	Surrey; 9 wickets	Surrey; 3 wickets	Surrey; 483 runs	Match drawn		Surrey; 10 wickets	Warwickshire; 31 runs	Surrey; 6 wickets
Sussex	Match drawn	Match drawn	Lancashire; 8 wickets	Match drawn	Match drawn	Sussex; 4 wickets		Warwickshire; 3 wickets	Match drawn
Warwickshire	Match drawn	Warwickshire; 10 wickets	Lancashire; 6 wickets	Warwickshire; 144 runs	Warwickshire; 88 runs	Match drawn	Warwickshire; 208 runs		Warwickshire; 6 wickets
Yorkshire	Match drawn	Kent; 8 wickets	Match drawn	Match drawn	Match drawn	Surrey inns & 168 runs	Sussex inns & 94 runs	Match drawn	

Home team won	Visiting team won	Match drawn

=== Division Two ===
	Derbyshire	Durham	Essex	Glamorgan	Gloucestershire	Middlesex	Northamptonshire	Nottinghamshire	Worcestershire
Derbyshire		Derbyshire; 2 runs	Essex; 140 runs	Derbyshire; 9 wickets	Match drawn	Middlesex; 73 runs	Derbyshire; 8 wickets	Match drawn	Worcestershire; 9 wickets
Durham	Durham; 89 runs		Essex; 10 wickets	Glamorgan; 10 wickets	Match drawn	Middlesex; 10 wickets	Northamptonshire; 7 wickets	Nottinghamshire; 8 wickets	Match drawn
Essex	Essex; 6 wickets	Essex; 4 wickets		Match drawn	Match drawn	Essex; 6 wickets	Essex; 9 wickets	Essex; 7 wickets	Worcestershire; 8 wickets
Glamorgan	Derbyshire; 163 runs	Glamorgan; 5 wickets	Glamorgan; 8 wickets		Match drawn	Middlesex; 8 wickets	Match drawn	Match drawn	Match drawn
Gloucestershire	Match drawn	Gloucestershire; 10 wickets	Essex; 3 wickets	Glamorgan; 2 wickets		Match drawn	Match drawn	Gloucestershire; 7 wickets	Worcestershire; 304 runs
Middlesex	Derbyshire; 204 runs	Match drawn	Match drawn	Match drawn	Middlesex; 5 wickets		Match drawn	Middlesex inns & 31 runs	Match drawn
Northamptonshire	Derbyshire; 177 runs	Northamptonshire; 1 wicket	Essex; 4 wickets	Northamptonshire; 8 wickets	Northamptonshire inns & 59 runs	Middlesex inns & 2 runs		Northamptonshire; 6 wickets	Match drawn
Nottinghamshire	Derbyshire; 4 wickets	Match drawn	Nottinghamshire; 7 wickets	Nottinghamshire; 7 wickets	Nottinghamshire inns & 84 runs	Nottinghamshire inns & 73 runs	Nottinghamshire; 7 wickets		Nottinghamshire; 114 runs
Worcestershire	Worcestershire; 1 wicket	Worcestershire inns & 308 runs	Essex; 5 wickets	Glamorgan; 110 runs	Worcestershire; 206 runs	Middlesex; 6 wickets	Worcestershire; 8 wickets	Match drawn	

Home team won	Visiting team won	Match drawn

=== Schedule ===
==== April ====
19–22 April	(H) Kent	v	Hampshire	Match drawn
Scorecard	577/7d (144overs); RWT Key 160 (179); CT Tremlett 4/129 (31 overs)		671 (195 overs); JP Crawley 272 (451); A Khan 3/165 (37 overs)	St Lawrence Ground, Canterbury; Umpires: Jeff Evans and Ian Gould
Scorecard	163/4d (37 overs); ET Smith 44 (43); CT Tremlett 2/63 (10 overs)			St Lawrence Ground, Canterbury; Umpires: Jeff Evans and Ian Gould
Kent won the toss and elected to bat; Points: Hampshire 11, Kent 10

19–22 April	Leicestershire	v	(H) Lancashire	Lancashire won by 1 wicket
Scorecard	385 (99.5 overs); VJ Wells 74 (112); G Chapple 3/61 (23.5 overs)		275 (66.3 overs); AJ Swann 80 (146); PAJ DeFreitas 6/101 (23 overs)	Old Trafford, Manchester; Umpires: Vanburn Holder and Barrie Leadbeater
Scorecard	277 (81.5 overs); DL Maddy 66 (139); KW Hogg 5/48 (16 overs)		388/9 (106.3 overs); GD Lloyd 73 (84); VJ Wells 2/30 (8 overs)	Old Trafford, Manchester; Umpires: Vanburn Holder and Barrie Leadbeater
Leicestershire won the toss and elected to bat; Points: Lancashire 17, Leicestershire 6

19–22 April	(H) Surrey	v	Sussex	Surrey won by 10 wickets
Scorecard	575/8d (126 overs); AD Brown 177 (222); RJ Kirtley 3/122 (32 overs)		308 (80.2 overs); MH Yardy 93 (169); AJ Tudor 4/84 (16 overs)	The Oval, London; Umpires: Nigel Cowley and Barry Dudleston
Scorecard	116/0 (21.2 overs); MA Butcher 68 (64)		379 (95 overs) (f/o); CJ Adams 114 (133); AJ Tudor 3/81 (21 overs)	The Oval, London; Umpires: Nigel Cowley and Barry Dudleston
Surrey won the toss and elected to bat; Points: Surrey 19.75, Sussex 5

24–27 April	Leicestershire	v	(H) Hampshire	Leicestershire won by an innings and 9 runs
Scorecard	428 (120 overs); VJ Wells 150 (259); CT Tremlett 3/87 (25 overs)		273 (97.4 overs); JP Crawley 80 (169); DL Maddy 4/37 (17 overs)	Rose Bowl, Southampton; Umpires: John Holder and Neil Mallender
Scorecard			146 (60.4 overs) (f/o); WS Kendall 53* (165); DL Maddy 5/37 (17 overs)	Rose Bowl, Southampton; Umpires: John Holder and Neil Mallender
Leicestershire won the toss and elected to bat; Points: Leicestershire 20, Hampshire 5

24–27 April	(H) Sussex	v	Somerset	Match drawn
Scorecard	337 (90.2 overs); MW Goodwin 162 (168); MPL Bulbeck 4/104 (28 overs)		401 (111.5 overs); PD Bowler 94 (177); RJ Kirtley 5/90 (27.5 overs)	County Ground, Hove; Umpires: Pasty Harris and Trevor Jesty
Scorecard	396/7d (98 overs); CJ Adams 101 (149); KA Parsons 2/74 (18 overs)		94/2 (32 overs); J Cox 40* (98); RJ Kirtley 1/10 (4 overs)	County Ground, Hove; Umpires: Pasty Harris and Trevor Jesty
Sussex won the toss and elected to bat; Points: Somerset 12, Sussex 10

24–27 April	(H) Warwickshire	v	Lancashire	Lancashire won by 6 wickets
Scorecard	297 (78.2 overs); NMK Smith 96 (108); PJ Martin 4/77 (21 overs)		251 (78.2 overs); GD Lloyd 80 (89); A Richardson 5/59 (21 overs)	Edgbaston, Birmingham; Umpires: Nigel Cowley and Barry Dudleston
Scorecard	150 (53.4 overs); NV Knight 49 (120); PJ Martin 4/41 (20 overs)		197/4 (39.4 overs); D Byas 83* (92); A Richardson 3/62 (11 overs)	Edgbaston, Birmingham; Umpires: Nigel Cowley and Barry Dudleston
Warwickshire won the toss and elected to bat; Points: Lancashire 17, Warwickshire 5

24–27 April	(H) Yorkshire	v	Surrey	Surrey won by an innings and 168 runs
Scorecard	140 (75.5 overs); MJ Lumb 30 (80); AJ Tudor 4/31 (19 overs)		510 (127.5 overs); AJ Stewart 96 (159); SP Kirby 5/129 (27 overs)	Headingley, Leeds; Umpires: Graham Burgess and Ian Gould
Scorecard	202 (57.3 overs); CR Taylor 52* (126); Azhar Mahmood 3/18 (13.3 overs)			Headingley, Leeds; Umpires: Graham Burgess and Ian Gould
Surrey won the toss and elected to field; Points: Surrey 20, Yorkshire 3

==== May ====
8–11 May	(H) Hampshire	v	Kent	Hampshire won by 8 wickets
Scorecard	345 (112.1 overs); RA Smith 104 (235); MJ Saggers 5/74 (30.1 overs)		118 (39 overs); A Symonds 39 (46); AD Mascarenhas 4/49 (14 overs)	Rose Bowl, Southampton; Umpires: Tony Clarkson and Ken Palmer
Scorecard	111/2 (26.2 overs); JP Crawley 50* (83); MJ Saggers 2/35 (9 overs)		337 (106.4 overs) (f/o); PA Nixon 77* (205); AD Mascarenhas 4/73 (25.4 overs)	Rose Bowl, Southampton; Umpires: Tony Clarkson and Ken Palmer
Hampshire won the toss and elected to bat; Points: Hampshire 18, Kent 3

8–11 May	(H) Leicestershire	v	Warwickshire	Leicestershire won by 7 wickets
Scorecard	523 (162.5 overs); MG Bevan 146 (347); AF Giles 5/126 (38.5 overs)		177 (56 overs); SM Pollock 59 (92); MG Bevan 3/25 (7 overs)	Grace Road, Leicester; Umpires: Barrie Leadbeater and Peter Willey
Scorecard	94/3 (14.3 overs); MG Bevan 38* (50); A Richardson 1/29 (4 overs)		439 (138.1 overs) (f/o); NV Knight 130 (325); DL Maddy 3/59 (26 overs)	Grace Road, Leicester; Umpires: Barrie Leadbeater and Peter Willey
Warwickshire won the toss and elected to field; Points: Leicestershire 19, Warwickshire 1

8–11 May	Yorkshire	v	(H) Somerset	Somerset won by 7 wickets
Scorecard	213 (56.3 overs); MJ Lumb 66 (95); AR Caddick 5/72 (23.3 overs)		232 (61. overs); ID Blackwell 114 (134); CEW Silverwood 4/28 (10.1 overs)	County Ground, Taunton; Umpires: David Constant and Roy Palmer
Scorecard	280 (85.4 overs); C White 69 (84); KA Parsons 3/44 (16 overs)		263 (64.2 overs); ME Trescothick 134 (177); CEW Silverwood 1/42 (12 overs)	County Ground, Taunton; Umpires: David Constant and Roy Palmer
Somerset won the toss and elected to field; Points: Somerset 16, Yorkshire 4

8–11 May	Lancashire	v	(H) Surrey	Surrey won by 3 wickets
Scorecard	320 (70.1 overs); A Flintoff 137 (106); IDK Salisbury 3/30 (10.1 overs)		216 (64.3 overs); AJ Tudor 61 (103); G Chapple 5/65 (18.3 overs)	The Oval, London; Umpires: Vanburn Holder and Jeremy Lloyds
Scorecard	200 (71.4 overs); WK Hegg 43 (96); Azhar Mahmood 8/61 (25 overs)		309/7 (85.4 overs); MR Ramprakash 119* (219); J Wood 3/52 (14 overs)	The Oval, London; Umpires: Vanburn Holder and Jeremy Lloyds
Lancashire won the toss and elected to bat; Points: Surrey 16, Lancashire 6

15–18 May	Yorkshire	v	(H) Kent	Kent won by 4 wickets
Scorecard	239 (87.2 overs); C White 104 (188); A Khan 6/52 (21.2 overs)		418 (105.3 overs); RWT Key 114 (156); CEW Silverwood 4/82 (21 overs)	St Lawrence Ground, Canterbury; Umpires: Jeff Evans and Vanburn Holder
Scorecard	346 (128.1 overs); RJ Blakey 90 (267); MJ Saggers 5/82 (30.1 overs)		169/6 (58.2 overs); MV Fleming 42* (58); DS Lehmann 3/40 (18 overs)	St Lawrence Ground, Canterbury; Umpires: Jeff Evans and Vanburn Holder
Yorkshire won the toss and elected to bat; Points: Kent 20, Yorkshire 4

15–18 May	Sussex	v	(H) Lancashire	Match drawn
Scorecard	423 (132.3 overs); CJ Adams 217 (369); KW Hogg 3/39 (19 overs)		366 (110.5 overs); SG Law 218 (346); JD Lewry 5/88 (27 overs)	Old Trafford, Manchester; Umpires: Nigel Llong and Peter Willey
Scorecard	221/7 (85 overs); RR Montgomerie 80 (223); PJ Martin 4/53 (21 overs)			Old Trafford, Manchester; Umpires: Nigel Llong and Peter Willey
Sussex won the toss and elected to bat; Points: Sussex 12, Lancashire 11

15–18 May	(H) Somerset	v	Leicestershire	Match drawn
Scorecard	565 (146.2 overs); J Cox 176 (295); CD Crowe 4/63 (17.2 overs)		288/8 (65.2 overs); DI Stevens 73 (76); MPL Bulbeck 3/69 (22 overs)	County Ground, Taunton; Umpires: Nigel Cowley and Ian Gould
Somerset won the toss and elected to bat; Points: Somerset 11, Leicestershire 8

15–18 May	(H) Warwickshire	v	Hampshire	Match drawn
Scorecard	472 (163.1 overs); NV Knight 255* (493); AD Mascarenhas 3/59 (24.5 overs)		302 (105.5 overs); NC Johnson 79 (165); MM Betts 3/75 (22 overs)	Edgbaston, Birmingham; Umpires: Mark Benson and Roy Palmer
Scorecard			306/5d (108 overs) (f/o); NC Johnson 74 (189); A Richardson 2/41 (21 overs)	Edgbaston, Birmingham; Umpires: Mark Benson and Roy Palmer
Warwickshire won the toss and elected to bat; Points: Warwickshire 10, Hampshire 10

24–27 May	(H) Surrey	v	Somerset	Match drawn
Scorecard	220 (69.1 overs); IJ Ward 62 (101); AR Caddick 5/66 (28 overs)		253 (80.2 overs); ID Blackwell 98 (112); MP Bicknell 4/72 (22 overs)	The Oval, London; Umpires: Graham Burgess and John Holder
Scorecard	332 (101 overs); IJ Ward 67 (143); ID Blackwell 3/19 (15 overs)		45/1 (10 overs); J Cox 14* (28); AJ Tudor 1/22 (4 overs)	The Oval, London; Umpires: Graham Burgess and John Holder
Surrey won the toss and elected to bat; Points: Somerset 9, Surrey 8

24–27 May	Leicestershire	v	(H)Sussex	Match drawn
Scorecard	264 (70.4 overs); VJ Wells 86* (136); RSC Martin-Jenkins		247 (69.5 overs); RR Montgomerie 122* (206); DE Malcolm 7/76 (19.5 overs)	Cricket Field Road Ground, Horsham; Umpires: Vanburn Holder and George Sharp
Scorecard	94/2 (29 overs); DL Maddy 31* (63); RJ Kirtley 1/26 (11 overs)			Cricket Field Road Ground, Horsham; Umpires: Vanburn Holder and George Sharp
Leicestershire won the toss and elected to bat; Points: Leicestershire 9, Sussex 8

24–27 May	Hampshire	v	(H) Yorkshire	Match drawn
Scorecard	354 (109.3 overs); JP Crawley 79 (158); MJ Hoggard 4/93 (27 overs)		423 (134.5 overs); RJ Blakey 83 (166); AD Mascarenhas 5/87 (29.5 overs)	Headingley, Leeds; Umpires: Allan Jones and Mervyn Kitchen
Scorecard	62/1 (18 overs); DA Kenway 30* (57); SP Kirby 1/18 (4 overs)			Headingley, Leeds; Umpires: Allan Jones and Mervyn Kitchen
Hampshire won the toss and elected to bat; Points: Yorkshire 12, Hampshire 11

31 May – 3 June	Warwickshire	v	(H) Hampshire	Match drawn
Scorecard	250 (111.2 overs); MJ Powell 92 (272); AD Mullally 6/56 (27.2 overs)		277 (104 overs); JP Crawley 60 (183); SM Pollock 4/37 (17 overs)	Rose Bowl, Southampton; Umpires: Ian Gould and John Steele
Scorecard	329/8d (103 overs); JO Troughton 131* (184); AD Mullally 3/87 (34 overs)		142/7 (49.4 overs); RA Smith 41 (56); DR Brown 3/33 (12 overs)	Rose Bowl, Southampton; Umpires: Ian Gould and John Steele
Warwickshire won the toss and elected to bat; Points: Hampshire 9, Warwickshire 9

31 May – 3 June	Sussex	v	(H) Kent	Kent won by 4 wickets
Scorecard	180 (68 overs); RR Montgomerie 35 (75); MJ Saggers 6/39 (18 overs)		343 (106.4 overs); A Symonds 89 (120); RJ Kirtley 4/88 (30.4 overs)	Nevill Ground, Tunbridge Wells; Umpires: Allan Jones and Barrie Leadbeater
Scorecard	354 (92.4 overs); RR Montgomerie 79 (148); A Symonds 6/105 (31 overs)		195/6 (55.5 overs); ET Smith 82 (120); RJ Kirtley 3/39 (16 overs)	Nevill Ground, Tunbridge Wells; Umpires: Allan Jones and Barrie Leadbeater
Kent won the toss and elected to field; Points: Kent 18, Sussex 3

31 May – 3 June	Surrey	v	(H) Lancashire	Match drawn
Scorecard	382 (147 overs); JN Batty 104 (220); G Keedy 5/122 (45 overs)		194 (76.1 overs); G Chapple 51 (113); Saqlain Mushtaq 4/43 (29 overs)	Old Trafford, Manchester; Umpires: David Constant and Nigel Cowley
Scorecard	246/6d (67 overs); IJ Ward 106 (169); JM Anderson 2/22 (9 overs)		112/3 (26 overs); NH Fairbrother 38 (34); MP Bicknell 2/52 (11 overs)	Old Trafford, Manchester; Umpires: David Constant and Nigel Cowley
Surrey won the toss and elected to bat; Points: Surrey 10, Lancashire 6

31 May – 3 June	Yorkshire	v	(H) Leicestershire	Leicestershire won by 5 wickets
Scorecard	310 (105.4 overs); C White 62 (125); DE Malcolm 6/72 (26.4 overs)		346 (95.4 overs); MG Bevan 142 (238); A McGrath 3/33 (12 overs)	Grace Road, Leicester; Umpires: Jeremy Lloyds and Alan Whitehead
Scorecard	239 (83.4 overs); DS Lehmann 119* (236); PAJ DeFreitas 5/38 (22.4 overs)		207/5 (62 overs); MG Bevan 76* (82); CEW Silverwood 2/30 (14 overs)	Grace Road, Leicester; Umpires: Jeremy Lloyds and Alan Whitehead
Yorkshire won the toss and elected to bat; Points: Leicestershire 18, Yorkshire 5.5

==== June ====
12–15 June	Hampshire	v	(H) Somerset	Match drawn
Scorecard	252 (76.3 overs); WS Kendall 88 (162); RL Johnson 3/32 (19.3 overs)		161/9d (74 overs); ID Blackwell 42 (47); AD Mullally 4/64 (27 overs)	Recreation Ground, Bath; Umpires: David Constant and George Sharp
Scorecard	98 (36.2 overs); RA Smith 41* (72); RL Johnson 7/43 (14.2 overs)		173/8 (60.5 overs); PD Bowler 48 (96); NC Johnson 3/36 (11.5 overs)	Recreation Ground, Bath; Umpires: David Constant and George Sharp
Somerset won the toss and elected to field; Points: Hampshire 9, Somerset 7

12–15 June	Kent	v	(H) Surrey	Surrey won by 9 wickets
Scorecard	153 (43 overs); PA Nixon 54 (87); MP Bicknell 6/42 (13 overs)		361 (87.1 overs); AD Brown 188 (208); MV Fleming 4/68 (23 overs)	The Oval, London; Umpires: Barry Dudleston and John Steele
Scorecard	268 (70.4 overs); DP Fulton 48 (79); ESH Giddins 3/80 (18 overs)		61/1 (22.3 overs); JN Batty 32* (64); MM Patel 1/8 (5 overs)	The Oval, London; Umpires: Barry Dudleston and John Steele
Surrey won the toss and elected to field; Points: Surrey 19, Kent 3

12–15 June	(H) Warwickshire	v	Leicestershire	Warwickshire won by 144 runs
Scorecard	462 (142.4 overs); JO Troughton 130 (207); GW Flower 4/66 (30 overs)		370 (115.2 overs); TR Ward 89 (111); SM Pollock 3/36 (22.2 overs)	Edgbaston, Birmingham; Umpires: Graham Burgess and Nigel Llong
Scorecard	206/7d (59 overs); SM Pollock 65 (84); PAJ DeFreitas 3/53 (22 overs)		154 (60.1 overs); VJ Wells 43 (71); NMK Smith 5/42 (23.1 overs)	Edgbaston, Birmingham; Umpires: Graham Burgess and Nigel Llong
Warwickshire won the toss and elected to bat; Points: Warwickshire 20, Leicestershire 6

12–15 June	Sussex	v	(H) Yorkshire	Sussex won by an innings and 94 runs
Scorecard	435 (129.1 overs); TR Ambrose 149 (281); RJ Sidebottom 3/78 (29 overs)		216 (92.5 overs); RJ Blakey 52 (154); RJ Kirtley 5/49 (27.5 overs)	Headingley, Leeds; Umpires: Pasty Harris and David Shepherd
Scorecard			125 (44.2 overs); RJ Blakey 28 (56); RJ Kirtley 5/41 (16.2 overs)	Headingley, Leeds; Umpires: Pasty Harris and David Shepherd
Yorkshire won the toss and elected to bowl; Points: Sussex 20, Yorkshire 4

26–29 June	(H) Lancashire	v	Kent	Kent won by 6 wickets
Scorecard	226 (61.1 overs); SG Law 75 (120); A Khan 5/74 (18 overs)		214 (71 overs); PA Nixon 49 (100); PJ Martin 5/54 (22 overs)	Aigburth, Liverpool; Umpires: David Constant and Jeff Evans
Scorecard	347 (102.2 overs); AJ Swann 85 (154); MA Ealham 3/53 (25 overs)		360/4 (105 overs); A Symonds 116 (155); G Keedy 2/58 (24 overs)	Aigburth, Liverpool; Umpires: David Constant and Jeff Evans
Lancashire won the toss and elected to bat; Points: Kent 15.5, Lancashire 4

26–29 June	Yorkshire	v	(H) Sussex	Match drawn
Scorecard	255 (93.5 overs); DS Lehmann 71 (112); RSC Martin-Jenkins 3/46 (15.5 overs)		392 (111.2 overs); MJ Prior 85 (96); C White 4/49 (17.2 overs)	Arundel Castle Cricket Ground, Arundel; Umpires: Neil Bainton and Graham Burgess
Scorecard	458/8d (126.1 overs); DS Lehmann 216 (302); BV Taylor 3/82 (28 overs)		216 /9 (79 overs); MJ Prior 70* (102); AKD Gray 3/62 (20 overs)	Arundel Castle Cricket Ground, Arundel; Umpires: Neil Bainton and Graham Burgess
Yorkshire won the toss and elected to bat; Points: Sussex 11, Yorkshire 9

26–29 June	(H) Warwickshire	v	Somerset	Warwickshire won by 88 runs
Scorecard	230 (68.3 overs); IR Bell 46 (77); PS Jones 4/46 (16.1 overs)		208 (57 overs); PD Bowler 57 (115); GG Wagg 4/43 (10 overs)	Edgbaston, Birmingham; Umpires: Trevor Jesty and John Steele
Scorecard	423 (120.3 overs); DP Ostler 175 (283); PS Jones 6/110 (33.3 overs)		357 (88.4 overs); RJ Turner 83* (155); SM Pollock 3/97 (25 overs)	Edgbaston, Birmingham; Umpires: Trevor Jesty and John Steele
Warwickshire won the toss and elected to bat; Points: Warwickshire 16, Somerset 4

==== July ====
3–6 July	Sussex	v	(H) Hampshire	Match drawn
Scorecard	246 (85.4 overs); RSC Martin-Jenkins 80* (135); SD Udal 5/56 (24.4 overs)		163 (53.3 overs); AD Mascarenhas 49 (86); RSC Martin-Jenkins 5/37 (15 overs)	Rose Bowl, Southampton; Umpires: Ken Palmer and George Sharp
Scorecard	111/4d (42.3 overs); MH Yardy 39 (87); SD Udal 2/19 (9 overs)		56/0 (13 overs); DA Kenway 29* (39)	Rose Bowl, Southampton; Umpires: Ken Palmer and George Sharp
Sussex won the toss and elected to bat; Points: Sussex 8, Hampshire 7

3–6 July	(H) Kent	v	Warwickshire	Match drawn
Scorecard	306 (94.4 overs); DP Fulton 101 (147); GG Wagg 3/38 (14 overs)		172 (60.3 overs); IR Bell 31 (81); MM Patel 5/56 (20 overs)	Mote Park, Maidstone; Umpires: Pasty Harris and John Holder
Scorecard	118/4d (37 overs); PA Nixon 34* (77); NM Carter 3/24 (10 overs)			Mote Park, Maidstone; Umpires: Pasty Harris and John Holder
Kent won the toss and elected to bat; Points: Kent 10, Warwickshire 7

3–6 July	(H) Leicestershire	v	Lancashire	Match drawn
Scorecard	219 (67 overs); DL Maddy 59 (137); JM Anderson 3/33 (14 overs)		180 (55.4 overs); MJ Chilton 57 (101); DE Malcolm 5/52 (16 overs)	Grace Road, Leicester; Umpires: Jeff Evans and Allan Jones
Scorecard	206/4d (63 overs); DL Maddy 79* (183); J Wood 2/13 (5 overs)			Grace Road, Leicester; Umpires: Jeff Evans and Allan Jones
Lancashire won the toss and elected to field; Points: Leicestershire 8, Lancashire 7

3–6 July	Surrey	v	(H) Somerset	Match drawn
Scorecard	608/6d (130.5 overs); MR Ramprakash 218 (339); SRG Francis 3/104 (25.5 overs)		554 (134.2 overs); MJ Wood 106 (144); R Clarke 3/104 (20 overs)	County Ground, Taunton; Umpires: Ian Gould and Alan Whitehead
Scorecard	324/5d (69.5 overs); JN Batty 151 (203); KA Parsons 3/91 (17.1 overs)		329/7d (56.4 overs); MJ Wood 131 (148); Saqlain Mushtaq 4/111 (23.4 overs)	County Ground, Taunton; Umpires: Ian Gould and Alan Whitehead
Somerset won the toss and elected to field; Points: Surrey 12, Somerset 11

10–13 July	Hampshire	v	(H) Leicestershire	Match drawn
Scorecard	311 (96.3 overs); N Pothas 63 (95); CD Crowe 3/63 (19 overs)		300/9d (121.2 overs); ND Burns 101 (194); AD Mullally 3/54 (27 overs)	Grace Road, Leicester; Umpires: Barry Dudleston and Pasty Harris
Scorecard	283 (98.4 overs); RA Smith 104 (201); DL Maddy 4/37 (17 overs)		72/4 (29 overs); TR Ward 18 (39); JD Francis 1/1 (2 overs)	Grace Road, Leicester; Umpires: Barry Dudleston and Pasty Harris
Hampshire won the toss and elected to bat; Points: Leicestershire 10, Hampshire 10

10–13 July	(H) Surrey	v	Warwickshire	Warwickshire won by 31 runs
Scorecard	475 (115.5 overs); MR Ramprakash 210 (308); DR Brown 7/110 (33.5 overs)		293 (71.5 overs); NMK Smith 74 (70); J Ormond 5/116 (23 overs)	The Oval, London; Umpires: Tony Clarkson and John Hampshire
Scorecard	137 (32.1 overs); AJ Hollioake 52* (62); SM Pollock 4/44 (12 overs)		350 (111.2 overs) (f/o); MJ Powell 95 (242); J Ormond 5/62 (18 overs)	The Oval, London; Umpires: Tony Clarkson and John Hampshire
Surrey won the toss and elected to bat; Points: Warwickshire 17, Surrey 8

10–13 July	(H) Sussex	v	Kent	Match drawn
Scorecard	145 (50 overs); MH Yardy 33 (94); A Khan 6/56 (15 overs)		349 (119.4 overs); ET Smith 141* (299); JD Lewry 3/82 (25 overs)	County Ground, Hove; Umpires: Allan Jones and Kevin Lyons
Scorecard	450 (151.2 overs); MW Goodwin 135 (317); MM Patel 3/51 (31 overs)		85/5 (29 overs); RWT Key 25 (52); RSC Martin-Jenkins 2/12 (5 overs)	County Ground, Hove; Umpires: Allan Jones and Kevin Lyons
Kent won the toss and elected to field; Points: Kent 10, Sussex 7

10–13 July	Somerset	v	(H) Yorkshire	Match drawn
Scorecard	498/9d (165.1 overs); PD Bowler 84 (189); RKJ Dawson 4/154 (40.1 overs)		323 (131.2 overs); DS Lehmann 64 (100); ID Blackwell 4/49 (37 overs)	North Marine Road Ground, Scarborough; Umpires: Ian Gould and John Holder
Scorecard			213/5 (70 overs) (f/o); DS Lehmann 75 (95); KP Dutch 2/73 (25 overs)	North Marine Road Ground, Scarborough; Umpires: Ian Gould and John Holder
Somerset won the toss and elected to bat; Points: Somerset 11, Yorkshire 9

19–22 July	(H) Kent	v	Surrey	Surrey won by 2 wickets
Scorecard	374 (91.5 overs); A Symonds 118 (110); Saqlain Mushtaq 5/122 (33.5 overs)		225 (50.5 overs); AJ Hollioake 122* (103); MJ Saggers 5/66 (13.5 overs)	St Lawrence Ground, Canterbury; Umpires: David Constant and Trevor Jesty
Scorecard	260 (73.5 overs); RWT Key 68 (129); Saqlain Mushtaq 4/60 (19.5 overs)		410/8 (126.3 overs); IJ Ward 168* (367); MJ Saggers 3/85 (31 overs)	St Lawrence Ground, Canterbury; Umpires: David Constant and Trevor Jesty
Kent won the toss and elected to bat; Points: Surrey 16, Kent 7

19–22 July	(H) Somerset	v	Sussex	Sussex won by an innings and 1 run
Scorecard	270 (68.2 overs); MPL Bulbeck 53* (70); KJ Innes 3/28 (4 overs)		644 (151.3 overs); RSC Martin-Jenkins 205* (233); KA Parsons 3/67 (19 overs)	County Ground, Taunton; Umpires: Jeff Evans and Mervyn Kitchen
Scorecard	373 (88.2 overs); ID Blackwell 114 (171); BV Taylor			County Ground, Taunton; Umpires: Jeff Evans and Mervyn Kitchen
Somerset won the toss and elected to bat; Points: Sussex 20, Somerset 4

19–22 July	(H) Yorkshire	v	Lancashire	Match drawn
Scorecard	515/5d (123.3 overs); DS Lehmann 187 (224); PJ Martin 2/73 (27 overs)		478 (145.3 overs); AJ Swann 128 (314); RJ Sidebottom 3/81 (27 overs)	Headingley, Leeds; Umpires: Tony Clarkson and John Steele
Scorecard	124/7 (39 overs); CEW Silverwood 30* (35); G Chapple 3/20 (12 overs)			Headingley, Leeds; Umpires: Tony Clarkson and John Steele
Yorkshire won the toss and elected to bat; Points: Yorkshire 11, Lancashire 10

24–27 July	(H) Leicestershire	v	Kent	Kent won by 6 wickets
Scorecard	131 (52.2 overs); ND Burns 40* (60); MJ Saggers 5/44 (17.2 overs)		339 (95 overs); RWT Key 127 (217); MJA Whiley 3/60 (17 overs)	Grace Road, Leicester; Umpires: Nigel Cowley and Vanburn Holder
Scorecard	400 (143.4 overs); PAJ DeFreitas 114 (165); MJ Saggers 4/68 (21.4 overs)		193/4 (49.5 overs); ET Smith 48* (98); DL Maddy 2/38 (13 overs)	Grace Road, Leicester; Umpires: Nigel Cowley and Vanburn Holder
Kent won the toss and elected to field; Points: Kent 18, Leicestershire 3

24–27 July	Yorkshire	v	(H) Surrey	Surrey won by 6 wickets
Scorecard	172 (46 overs); A McGrath 26 (45); R Clarke 3/41 (8 overs)		382 (94.4 overs); JN Batty 99 (207); RJ Sidebottom 3/57 (22 overs)	Woodbridge Road, Guildford; Umpires: Nigel Llong and Ken Palmer
Scorecard	446 (122.3 overs); MJ Lumb 124 (196); ESH Giddins 4/113 (35 overs)		237/4 (68.3 overs); IJ Ward 124* (217); RJ Sidebottom 1/39 (13 overs)	Woodbridge Road, Guildford; Umpires: Nigel Llong and Ken Palmer
Yorkshire won the toss and elected to bat; Points: Surrey 19, Yorkshire 3

24–27 July	(H) Warwickshire	v	Sussex	Warwickshire won by 208 runs
Scorecard	493 (127.3 overs); NV Knight 245* (390); JD Lewry 4/151 (38 overs)		377 (110.2 overs); PA Cottey 137 (245); DR Brown 3/72 (20.2 overs)	Edgbaston, Birmingham; Umpires: David Constant and John Holder
Scorecard	284/6d (67 overs); NV Knight 97 (200); BV Taylor 3/83 (21 overs)		192 (66.5 overs); PA Cottey 64 (94); A Richardson 8/46 (23.5 overs)	Edgbaston, Birmingham; Umpires: David Constant and John Holder
Sussex won the toss and elected to field; Points: Warwickshire 20, Sussex 7

25–27 July	Lancashire	v	(H) Hampshire	Lancashire won by 111 runs
Scorecard	183 (76.2 overs); AJ Swann 66 (167); CT Tremlett 5/68 (22.2 overs)		132 (53 overs); WS Kendall 54 (152); JM Anderson 6/23 (14 overs)	Rose Bowl, Southampton; Umpires: Allan Jones and Alan Whitehead
Scorecard	187 (60 overs); NH Fairbrother 39 (83); SD Udal 5/59 (23 overs)		127 (33.5 overs); NC Johnson 28 (39); J Wood 4/17 (4.5 overs)	Rose Bowl, Southampton; Umpires: Allan Jones and Alan Whitehead
Lancashire won the toss and elected to bat; Points: Lancashire 15, Hampshire 3

==== August ====
7–10 August	(H) Kent	v	Somerset	Kent won by 153 runs
Scorecard	271 (78 overs); DP Fulton 89 (147); AR Caddick 5/65 (22 overs)		227 (70.5 overs); MJ Wood 55 (157); A Khan 5/76 (18 overs)	St Lawrence Ground, Canterbury; Umpires: Ken Palmer and David Shepherd
Scorecard	286/7d (85 overs); MM Patel 71* (77); AR Caddick 3/108 (29 overs)		177 (48.3 overs); KA Parsons 52 (79); MJ Saggers 5/42 (10.3 overs)	St Lawrence Ground, Canterbury; Umpires: Ken Palmer and David Shepherd
Kent won the toss and elected to bat; Points: Kent 17, Somerset 4

7–10 August	Warwickshire	v	(H) Yorkshire	Match drawn
Scorecard	233 (73.5 overs); NV Knight 79 (119); CEW Silverwood 3/49 (17 overs)		313 (98.4 overs); DS Lehmann 75 (125); DR Brown 3/61 (19 overs)	Headingley, Leeds; Umpires: Neil Mallender and George Sharp
Scorecard	216/4 (72 overs); NV Knight 109 (205); GM Fellows 2/23 (5 overs)			Headingley, Leeds; Umpires: Neil Mallender and George Sharp
Warwickshire won the toss and elected to bat; Points: Yorkshire 10, Warwickshire 8

8–11 August	(H) Lancashire	v	Hampshire	Match drawn
Scorecard	163 (63 overs); AJ Swann 84* (184); CT Tremlett 5/57 (17 overs)		122/8d (41.1 overs); N Pothas 26 (46); G Chapple 3/33 (10 overs)	Old Trafford, Manchester; Umpires: Barry Dudleston and Nigel Llong
Scorecard	52/0 (20 overs); AJ Swann 29* (56)			Old Trafford, Manchester; Umpires: Barry Dudleston and Nigel Llong
Lancashire won the toss and elected to bat; Points: Hampshire 7, Lancashire 6

8–11 August	Surrey	v	(H) Sussex	Sussex won by 4 wickets
Scorecard	193 (58.4 overs); AD Brown 49 (52); KJ Innes 4/41 (14.4 overs)		203 (66.1 over); KJ Innes 41* (93); AJ Tudor 5/66 (22 overs)	County Ground, Hove; Umpires: Roy Palmer and Peter Willey
Scorecard	296 (77.2 overs); IJ Ward 76 (127); MJG Davis 6/97 (26 overs)		288/6 (93.1 overs); MW Goodwin 100 (227); TJ Murtagh 3/47 (13.1 overs)	County Ground, Hove; Umpires: Roy Palmer and Peter Willey
Sussex won the toss and elected to field; Points: Sussex 16, Surrey 3

14–17 August	Somerset	v	(H) Hampshire	Hampshire won by 4 wickets
Scorecard	278 (96.5 overs); RL Johnson 61 (37); AD Mullally 4/58 (25 overs)		236 (96 overs); JD Francis 53 (149); ID Blackwell 5/49 (31 overs)	Rose Bowl, Southampton; Umpires: GI Burgess and Mervyn Kitchen
Scorecard	190 (74.4 overs); PCL Holloway 48 (146); CT Tremlett 3/42 (16.4 overs)		233/6 (73.1 overs); NC Johnson 57 (90); SRG Francis 2/20 (9 overs)	Rose Bowl, Southampton; Umpires: GI Burgess and Mervyn Kitchen
Somerset won the toss and elected to bat; Points: Hampshire 16, Somerset 5

14–17 August	Yorkshire	v	(H) Lancashire	Yorkshire won by 150 runs
Scorecard	294 (115 overs); MTG Elliott 83 (127); JM Anderson 5/61 (28 overs)		301/9d (87.4 overs); AJ Swann 112 (188); ND Thornicroft 2/51 (14 overs)	Old Trafford, Manchester; Umpires: John Holder and John Steele
Scorecard	305 (91.4 overs); GM Fellows 109 (200); G Keedy 3/63 (24 overs)		148 (49.3 overs); NH Fairbrother 38 (62); RKJ Dawson 5/42 (14.3 overs)	Old Trafford, Manchester; Umpires: John Holder and John Steele
Yorkshire won the toss and elected to bat; Points: Yorkshire 17, Lancashire 6

14–17 August	Surrey	v	(H) Leicestershire	Surrey won by 7 wickets
Scorecard	540 (128.4 overs); MA Butcher 116 (170); DL Maddy 5/104 (25.4 overs)		290 (87.3 overs); DL Maddy 81 (144); Mushtaq Ahmed 5/71 (30 overs)	Grace Road, Leicester; Umpires: Pasty Harris and Allan Jones
Scorecard	42/3 (6.1 overs); AD Brown 14* (10); DE Malcolm 2/7 (3 overs)		289 (83.1 overs) (f/o); DL Maddy 94 (141); AJ Tudor 4/54 (17.1 overs)	Grace Road, Leicester; Umpires: Pasty Harris and Allan Jones
Surrey won the toss and elected to bat; Points: Surrey 20, Leicestershire 5

14–17 August	(H) Warwickshire	v	Kent	Warwickshire won by 10 wickets
Scorecard	565 (145 overs); JO Troughton 115 (241); JC Tredwell 4/103 (34 overs)		252 (85.5 overs); PA Nixon 103 (216); AF Giles 5/74 (30.5 overs)	Edgbaston, Birmingham; Umpires: Tony Clarkson and Jeremy Lloyds
Scorecard	8/0 (0.3 overs); MJ Powell 8* (3)		317 (91.3 overs); MA Ealham 83 (142); AF Giles 7/142 (40.3 overs)	Edgbaston, Birmingham; Umpires: Tony Clarkson and Jeremy Lloyds
Warwickshire won the toss and elected to bat; Points: Warwickshire 20, Kent 3

21–24 August	(H) Somerset	v	Warwickshire	Match drawn
Scorecard	408 (106.2 overs); ID Blackwell 110 (105); GG Wagg 4/62 (17.2 overs)		304 (82.1 overs); NV Knight 98 (148); SRG Francis 5/73 (18.1 overs)	County Ground, Taunton; Umpires: Barry Dudleston and Allan Jones
Scorecard	394 (96.3 overs); ID Blackwell 81 (93); SE Bond 5/64 (26 overs)		310/9 (117 overs); IR Bell 77 (165); RL Johnson 4/60 (33 overs)	County Ground, Taunton; Umpires: Barry Dudleston and Allan Jones
Somerset won the toss and elected to bat; Points: Somerset 12, Warwickshire 10

22–25 August	Leicestershire	v	(H) Kent	Match drawn
Scorecard	259 (91 overs); IJ Sutcliffe 125* (252); MJ Saggers 4/68 (19 overs)		379 (109.2 overs); ET Smith 87 (154); J Srinath 4/70 (26 overs)	St Lawrence Ground, Canterbury; Umpires: John Holder and Trevor Jesty
Scorecard	530 (138.5 overs); DL Maddy 156 (308); MM Patel 4/99 (52.5 overs)		58/0 (16 overs); DP Fulton 41* (53)	St Lawrence Ground, Canterbury; Umpires: John Holder and Trevor Jesty
Leicestershire won the toss and elected to bat; points: Kent 11, Leicestershire 9

22–25 August	Hampshire	v	(H) Surrey	Surrey won by an innings and 60 runs
Scorecard	190 (85.2 overs); N Pothas 58 (113); Saqlain Mushtaq 5/59 (34.2 overs)		576 (135.3 overs); AD Brown 135 (154); SD Udal 4/213 (47 overs)	The Oval, London; Umpires: Neil Mallender and Alan Whitehead
Scorecard	326 (90.4 overs); AD Mascarenhas 94 (124); Saqlain Mushtaq 6/121 (39 overs)			The Oval, London; Umpires: Neil Mallender and Alan Whitehead
Hampshire won the toss and elected to bat; Points: Surrey 20, Hampshire 2

22–25 August	(H) Sussex	v	Lancashire	Lancashire won by 7 wickets
Scorecard	240 (74.2 overs); MW Goodwin 87 (176); G Chapple 4/61 (15 overs)		425 (124 overs); SG Law 147 (212); RSC Martin-Jenkins 3/67 (26 overs)	County Ground, Hove; Umpires: John Hampshire and Mervyn Kitchen
Scorecard	277 (116.2 overs); CJ Adams 61 (156); G Chapple 6/66 (31 overs)		93/3 (25.2 overs); SG Law 45* (61); RJ Kirtley 2/10 (5 overs)	County Ground, Hove; Umpires: John Hampshire and Mervyn Kitchen
Lancashire won the toss and elected to field; Lancashire 20, Sussex 4

27–30 August	(H) Hampshire	v	Yorkshire	Yorkshire won by 7 wickets
Scorecard	269 (83.2 overs); RA Smith 58 (135); A McGrath 4/49 (16 overs)		280 (88 overs); MTG Elliott 92 (182); SD Udal 5/69 (29 overs)	Rose Bowl, Southampton; Umpires: Jeff Evans and Jeremy Lloyds
Scorecard	161 (55.4 overs); AD Mascarenhas 32* (66); RKJ Dawson 5/49 (22 overs)		152/3 (41.4 overs); VJ Craven 72 (119); AD Mascarenhas 1/18 (9 overs)	Rose Bowl, Southampton; Umpires: Jeff Evans and Jeremy Lloyds
Hampshire won the toss and elected to bat; Yorkshire 17, Hampshire 5

27–30 August	(H) Lancashire	v	Somerset	Lancashire won by 336 runs
Scorecard	251 (67.1 overs); SG Law 77 (98); RL Johnson 6/47 (18.1 overs)		140 (51.5 overs); KP Dutch 35 (65); JM Anderson 6/41 (11.5 overs)	Stanley Park, Blackpool; Umpires: Mark Benson and Pasty Harris
Scorecard	296 (82.1 overs); D Byas 81 (156); AR Caddick 6/84 (23.1 overs)		71 (30.3 overs); PD Bowler 18 (41); G Chapple 6/30 (12.3 overs)	Stanley Park, Blackpool; Umpires: Mark Benson and Pasty Harris
Lancashire won the toss and elected to bat; Points: Lancashire 17, Somerset 3

27–30 August	Sussex	v	(H) Leicestershire	Leicestershire won by 8 wickets
Scorecard	215 (80.2 overs); RSC Martin-Jenkins 62 (97); DE Malcolm 5/38 (16.2 overs)		247 (101 overs); IJ Sutcliffe 75 (220); RJ Kirtley 4/89 (26)	Grace Road, Leicester; Umpires: Tony Clarkson and Neil Mallender
Scorecard	142 (55.5 overs); KJ Innes 49* (66); PAJ DeFreitas 4/42 (19 overs)		111/2 (31.4 overs); IJ Sutcliffe 30* (95); KJ Innes 1/15 (4 overs)	Grace Road, Leicester; Umpires: Tony Clarkson and Neil Mallender
Sussex won the toss and elected to bat; Points: Leicestershire 16, Sussex 4

27–30 August	(H) Warwickshire	v	Surrey	Match drawn
Scorecard	345 (118.2 overs); NV Knight 74 (156); Saqlain Mushtaq 4/94 (49 overs)		544 (136.1 overs); N Shahid 116 (157); DR Brown 4/124 (28.1 overs)	Edgbaston, Birmingham; Umpires: Mervyn Kitchen and Barrie Leadbeater
Scorecard	404/9d (134 overs); NV Knight 133 (302); Saqlain Mushtaq 4/80 (43 overs)			Edgbaston, Birmingham; Umpires: Mervyn Kitchen and Barrie Leadbeater
Warwickshire won the toss and elected to bat; Points: Surrey 12, Warwickshire 9

==== September ====
4–7 September	(H) Lancashire	v	Warwickshire	Match drawn
Scorecard	598 (152.5 overs); PJ Martin 117*(121); Alan Richardson 3/102 (28 overs)		328 (89.2 overs); NM Carter 70 (61); CP Schofield 3/25 (8.2 overs)	Old Trafford, Manchester; Umpires: Graham Burgess and Trevor Jesty
Lancashire won the toss and elected to bat; Points: Lancashire 12, Warwickshire 9

4–7 September	(H) Somerset	v	Kent	Match drawn
Scorecard	460 (111.5 overs); MJ Wood 196 (298); MJ Saggers 4/87 (22.5 overs)		400/6d (120 overs); ET Smith 154 (279); ID Blackwell 2/70 (20 overs)	County Ground, Taunton; Umpires: George Sharp and John Steele
Scorecard	316/9d (91.4 overs); PD Bowler 81 (145); DD Masters 3/49 (15.4 overs)		171/4 (61 overs); PA Nixon 51* (132); SRG Francis 3/44 (16 overs)	County Ground, Taunton; Umpires: George Sharp and John Steele
Kent won the toss and elected to field; Points: Kent 12, Somerset 11

4–7 September	(H) Yorkshire	v	Leicestershire	Match drawn
Scorecard	276 (82 overs); C White 161 (216); DE Malcolm 4/95 (21 overs)		279 (79.2 overs); ND Burns 59 (71); RJ Sidebottom 5/60 (21 overs)	North Marine Road Ground, Scarborough; Umpires: Mervyn Kitchen and Roy Palmer
Scorecard	347/8d (103 overs); RJ Blakey 63* (130); VJ Wells 5/39 (17 overs)		231/5 (63 overs); DL Maddy 86 (170); SP Kirby 3/56 (21 overs)	North Marine Road Ground, Scarborough; Umpires: Mervyn Kitchen and Roy Palmer
Yorkshire won the toss and elected to bat; Points: Leicestershire 9, Yorkshire 8

5–8 September	(H) Sussex	v	Hampshire	Match drawn
Scorecard	631/6d (156 overs); RR Montgomerie 196 (345); AD Mascarenhas 2/114 (31 overs)		401 (121.2 overs); JS Laney 89 (159); RJ Kirtley 6/107 (29.2 overs)	County Cricket Ground, Hove; Umpires: Vanburn Holder and Barrie Leadbeater
Scorecard	67/1 (37 overs); NC Johnson 51* (110); MJG Davis 1/26 (11 overs)			County Cricket Ground, Hove; Umpires: Vanburn Holder and Barrie Leadbeater
Hampshire won the toss and elected to field; Points: Sussex 12, Hampshire 10

11–14 September	Surrey	v	(H) Hampshire	Surrey won by 123 runs
Scorecard	418 (127.2 overs); IJ Ward 112 (188); SD Udal 3/82 (34 overs)		327 (76 overs); JP Crawley 82 (100); J Ormond 4/87 (20 overs)	Rose Bowl, Southampton; Umpires: John Holder and John Steele
Scorecard	422/8d (103.2 overs); IJ Ward 156 (240); JEK Schofield 3/94 (23 overs)		390 (81.2 overs); N Pothas 99 (142); MP Bicknell 5/56 (14 overs)	Rose Bowl, Southampton; Umpires: John Holder and John Steele
Surrey won the toss and elected to bat; Points: Surrey 20, Hampshire 6

11–14 September	(H) Kent	v	Lancashire	Kent won by 6 wickets
Scorecard	405 (133.4 overs); DP Fulton 177 (342); JM Anderson 3/88 (22 overs)		197 (71.2 overs); AJ Swann 38 (100); MJ Saggers 4/34 (21 overs)	St Lawrence Ground. Canterbury; Umpires: Roy Palmer and Alan Whitehead
Scorecard	144/4 (38.2 overs); ET Smith 68 (107); Chris Schofield 2/16 (5 overs)		351 (143.4 overs) (f/o); SG Law 90 (195); MJ Saggers 4/64 (20.4 overs)	St Lawrence Ground. Canterbury; Umpires: Roy Palmer and Alan Whitehead
Kent won the toss and elected to bat; Points: Kent 19, Lancashire 2

12–15 September	Somerset	v	(H) Leicestershire	Leicestershire won by an innings and 18 runs
Scorecard	191 (42.3 overs); Mike Burns 97* (105); J Srinath 4/60 (14 overs)		310 (81.4 overs); TR Ward 84 (150); PD Trego 3/65 (17 overs)	Grace Road, Leicester; Umpires: John Hampshire and Nigel Llong
Scorecard	101 (29.5 overs); MPL Bulbeck 18 (19); J Srinath 5/25 (11 overs)			Grace Road, Leicester; Umpires: John Hampshire and Nigel Llong
Leicestershire won the toss and elected to field; Points: Leicestershire 18, Somerset 2.75

12–15 September	(H) Warwickshire	v	Yorkshire	Warwickshire won by 6 wickets
Scorecard	601/9d (145 overs); DP Ostler 225 (240); ND Thornicroft 2/104 (21 overs)		351 (86.1 overs); MTG Elliott 74 (66); MA Wagh 5/137 (36 overs)	Edgbaston, Birmingham; Umpires: Vanburn Holder and Peter Willey
Scorecard	232/4 (48 overs); MJ Powell 92* (141); RKJ Dawson 3/85 (17 overs)		481 (128.4 overs) (f/o); MTG Elliott 127 (189); JAS Spires 5/165 (44.4 overs)	Edgbaston, Birmingham; Umpires: Vanburn Holder and Peter Willey
Warwickshire won the toss and elected to bat; points: Warwickshire 20, Yorkshire 6

18–21 September	(H) Somerset	v	Lancashire	Lancashire won by 8 wickets
Scorecard	221 (61.4 overs); PD Trego 47 (63); PJ Martin 4/52 (19 overs)		228 (55.3 overs); KW Hogg 50 (56); MPL Bulbeck 6/93 (24.3 overs)	County Ground, Taunton; Umpires: Jeremy Lloyds and Ken Palmer
Scorecard	129 (46.3 overs); PCL Holloway 45 (60); PJ Martin 4/29 (14 overs)		124/2 (16.3 overs); D Byas 63* (55); RL Johnson 1/23 (5 overs)	County Ground, Taunton; Umpires: Jeremy Lloyds and Ken Palmer
Lancashire won the toss and elected to field; Points: Lancashire 16, Somerset 4

18–21 September	(H) Surrey	v	Leicestershire	Surrey won by 483 runs
Scorecard	494 (111.2 overs); SA Newman 183 (257); J Srinath 5/114 (26.2 overs)		361 (93.5 overs); DL Maddy 127* (204); PJ Sampson 3/52 (11 overs)	The Oval, London; Umpires: Mark Benson and Nigel Llong
Scorecard	492 /9d (105.1 overs); AJ Hollioake 208 (252); J Srinath 3/89 (26 overs)		142 (38.5 overs); ND Burns 68 (61); TJ Murtagh 5/39 (12 overs)	The Oval, London; Umpires: Mark Benson and Nigel Llong
Surrey won the toss and elected to bat; Points: Surrey 20, Leicestershire 7; Surrey won the 2002 Frizzell County Championship Division One

18–21 September	(H) Sussex	v	Warwickshire	Warwickshire won by 3 wickets
Scorecard	352 (95.1 overs); MW Goodwin 93 (170); DR Brown 5/103 (29 overs)		293 (66.4 overs); NM Carter 103 (73); BV Taylor 5/90 (17 overs)	County Cricket Ground, Hove; Umpires: Jeff Evans and Ian Gould
Scorecard	341 (103 overs); MW Goodwin 111 (135); MA Sheikh 4/78 (31 overs)		405/7 (96.2 overs); MJ Powell 103 (219); RSC Martin-Jenkins 2/68 (23 overs)	County Cricket Ground, Hove; Umpires: Jeff Evans and Ian Gould
Sussex won the toss and elected to bat; Points: Warwickshire 17, Sussex 7

18–21 September	Kent	v	(H) Yorkshire	Kent won by 8 wickets
Scorecard	399 (116.2 overs); SR Waugh 146 (249); RJ Sidebottom 4/61 (25.2 overs)		218 (60.1 overs); C White 62 (81); MJ Saggers 4/44 (13 overs)	Headingley, Leeds; Umpires: Barry Dudleston and Neil Mallender
Scorecard	103/2 (21.1 overs); RWT Key 33 (46); RJ Sidebottom 2/34 (8 overs)		283 (79.4 overs) (f/o); RJ Blakey 94 (140); A Khan 3/41 (15 overs)	Headingley, Leeds; Umpires: Barry Dudleston and Neil Mallender
Yorkshire won the toss and elected to field; Points: Kent 19, Yorkshire 2.25

==== April ====
19–22 April	Middlesex	v	(H) Durham	Middlesex won by 10 wickets
Scorecard	347 (110.4 overs); SG Koenig 100 (198); SJ Harmison 3/72 (27 overs)		160 (54.3 overs); GJ Muchall 48 (113); SJ Cook 3/37 (12 overs)	Riverside Ground, Chester-le-Street; Umpires: John Steele and Peter Willey
Scorecard	27/0 (4 overs); AJ Strauss 19* (15)		213 (56.5 overs); ML Love 101* (163); AA Noffke 3/63 (15 overs)	Riverside Ground, Chester-le-Street; Umpires: John Steele and Peter Willey
Middlesex won the toss and elected to bat; Points: Middlesex 18, Durham 3

19–22 April	Derbyshire	v	(H) Glamorgan	Derbyshire won by 163 runs
Scorecard	217 (57.3 overs); JID Kerr 58 (70); SP Jones 6/45 (14 overs)		175 (48.4 overs); A Dale 56 (94); DG Cork 6/51 (17.4 overs)	Sophia Gardens, Cardiff; Umpires: Tony Clarkson and George Sharp
Scorecard	462/6d (128 overs); SD Stubbings 128 (233); SD Thomas 2/78 (21 overs)		341 (90 overs); MA Wallace 106* (170); LJ Wharton 6/103 (29 overs)	Sophia Gardens, Cardiff; Umpires: Tony Clarkson and George Sharp
Derbyshire won the toss and elected to bat; Points: Derbyshire 16, Glamorgan 3

19–22 April	(H) Worcestershire	v	Gloucestershire	Worcestershire won by 206 runs
Scorecard	333 (118.4 overs); BF Smith 129 (279); J Lewis 6/77 (19.4 overs)		268 (73.1 overs); CM Spearman 111 (130); AJ Bichel 9/93 (23.1 overs)	County Ground, New Road, Worcester; Umpires: Mark Benson and Mervyn Kitchen
Scorecard	295 (77.1 overs); GA Hick 92 (111); J Lewis 6/54 (17 overs)		154 (45.4 overs); IJ Harvey 41 (37); GJ Batty 3/33 (7.4 overs)	County Ground, New Road, Worcester; Umpires: Mark Benson and Mervyn Kitchen
Worcestershire won the toss and elected to bat; Points: Worcestershire 18, Gloucestershire 5

24–27 April	(H) Derbyshire	v	Durham	Derbyshire won by 2 runs
Scorecard	263 (75.4 overs); MJ Di Venuto 56 (93); N Killeen 4/52 (19 overs)		258 (80.1 overs); N Peng 108 (167); DG Cork 5/72 (23.1 overs)	County Ground, Derby; Umpires: Roy Palmer and Alan Whitehead
Scorecard	229 (62 overs); KJ Dean 50 (68); PD Collingwood 4/31 (12 overs)		232 (55.3 overs); PD Collingwood 76 (94); DG Cork 5/54 (14.3 overs)	County Ground, Derby; Umpires: Roy Palmer and Alan Whitehead
Durham won the toss and elected to field; Points: Derbyshire 17, Durham 5

24–27 April	Gloucestershire	v	(H) Essex	Match drawn
Scorecard	379 (110.3 overs); MW Alleyne 142* (258); JM Dakin 4/62 (23.3 overs)		379 (126.2 overs); DDJ Robinson 131 (325); IJ Harvey 6/68 (25.2 overs)	County Ground, Chelmsford; Umpires: Nigel Llong and Ken Palmer
Scorecard	195/4d (48 overs); KJ Barnett 100* (150); JM Dakin 2/8 (7 overs)			County Ground, Chelmsford; Umpires: Nigel Llong and Ken Palmer
Gloucestershire won the toss and elected to bat; Points: Essex 11, Gloucestershire 11

24–27 April	(H) Middlesex	v	Nottinghamshire	Middlesex won by an innings and 31 runs
Scorecard	462 (114.2 overs); EC Joyce 119 (163); GJ Smith 4/70 (23.2 overs)		159 (60.4 overs); DJ Bicknell 48 (116); ARC Fraser 5/61 (22 overs)	Lord's, London; Umpires: Mark Benson and Allan Jones
Scorecard			272 (84.2 overs) (f/o); GE Welton 51 (122); AA Noffke 7/100 (23.2 overs)	Lord's, London; Umpires: Mark Benson and Allan Jones
Middlesex won the toss and elected to bat; Points: Middlesex 20, Nottinghamshire 3

24–17 April	Worcestershire	v	(H) Northamptonshire	Match drawn
Scorecard	524/8d (128.1 overs); DA Leatherdale 154 (259); JAR Blain 4/144 (29 overs)		614/5d (174 overs); MEK Hussey 170 (309); Kabir Ali 2/102 (23 overs)	County Ground, Northampton; Umpires: Jeff Evans and Barrie Leadbeater
Worcestershire won the toss and elected to bat; Points: Northamptonshire 11, Worcestershire 10

==== May ====
8–11 May	(H) Derbyshire	v	Northamptonshire	Derbyshire won by 8 wickets
Scorecard	538 (119.2 overs); MJ Di Venuto 230 (254); RSG Anderson 4/97 (20 overs)		131 (45.5 overs); CG Greenidge 46 (107); DG Cork 4/29 (11 overs)	County Ground, Derby; Umpires: Ian Gould and George Sharp
Scorecard	33/2 (8.4 overs); DR Hewson 17 (14); CG Greenidge 1/6 (4 overs)		439 (122.1 overs) (f/o); MEK Hussey 150 (277); G Welch 4/107 (34 overs)	County Ground, Derby; Umpires: Ian Gould and George Sharp
Northamptonshire won the toss and elected to field; Derbyshire 19.75, Northamptonshire 3

8–11 May	(H) Nottinghamshire	v	Essex	Nottinghamshire won by 7 wickets
Scorecard	130 (47.4 overs); RC Irani 37 (59); AJ Harris 4/41 (14.4 overs)		213 (67.5 overs); JER Gallian 52 (135); RC Irani 6/71 (23.5 overs)	Trent Bridge, Nottingham; Umpires: Barry Dudleston and Mervyn Kitchen
Scorecard	270 (69 overs); AP Grayson 83 (109); GJ Smith 8/53 (23 overs)		188/3 (41.5 overs); U Afzaal 85* (119); JM Dakin 1/16 (8 overs)	Trent Bridge, Nottingham; Umpires: Barry Dudleston and Mervyn Kitchen
Nottinghamshire won the toss and elected to field; Points: Nottinghamshire 16, Essex 2.5

8–11 May	Glamorgan	v	(H) Worcestershire	Glamorgan won by 110 runs
Scorecard	286 (91.4 overs); RDB Croft 59 (141); Kabir Ali 5/80 (23.4 overs))		298 (96.1 overs); A Singh 81 (152); SD Thomas 5/77 (25 overs)	County Ground, New Road, Worcester; Umpires: Nigel Cowley and Neil Mallender
Scorecard	348 (108 overs); DL Hemp 64 (156); A Sheriyar 5/86 (30 overs)		226 (61 overs); BF Smith 61 (95); MS Kasprowicz 5/77 (23 overs)	County Ground, New Road, Worcester; Umpires: Nigel Cowley and Neil Mallender
Worcestershire won the toss and elected to field; Points: Glamorgan 17, Worcestershire 5

15–18 May	Durham	v	(H) Glamorgan	Glamorgan won by 5 wickets
Scorecard	162 (51.2 overs); ML Love 71 (97); SD Thomas 7/33 (15.2 overs)		205 (89 overs); Mike Powell 62 (173); M Davies 2/20 (15 overs)	Sophia Gardens, Cardiff; Umpires: Graham Burgess and Pasty Harris
Scorecard	243 (67.1 overs); PD Collingwood 99 (146); SP Jones 3/42 (13 overs)		204/5 (51 overs); SP James 121 (164); M Davies 2/29 (11 overs)	Sophia Gardens, Cardiff; Umpires: Graham Burgess and Pasty Harris
Glamorgan won the toss and elected to field; Points: Glamorgan 16, Durham 3

15–18 May	(H) Gloucestershire	v	Nottinghamshire	Gloucestershire won by 7 wickets
Scorecard	197 (57 overs); DJ Bicknell 38 (62); JMM Averis 5/51 (16 overs)		347 (109 overs); CM Spearman 118 (157); MN Malik 4/55 (18 overs)	County Ground, Bristol; Umpires: Allan Jones and Neil Mallender
Scorecard	182 (68.5 overs); GE Welton 68 (123); JMM Averis 3/34 (15.5 overs)		33/3 (7.4 overs); KJ Barnett 23 (17); MN Malik 2/14 (3.4 overs)	County Ground, Bristol; Umpires: Allan Jones and Neil Mallender
Nottinghamshire won the toss and elected to bat; Points: Gloucestershire 18, Nottinghamshire 3

15–18 May	Middlesex	v	(H) Northamptonshire	Middlesex won by an innings and 2 runs
Scorecard	541 (158.3 overs); PN Weekes 107 (183); JW Cook 2/47 (15 overs)		286 (70.1 overs); AS Rollins 107 (183); SJ Cook 8/63 (18 overs)	County Ground, Northampton; Umpires: Tony Clarkson and Alan Whitehead
Scorecard			253 (75.4 overs) (f/o); JW Cook 84 (140); AW Laraman 4/55 (19 overs)	County Ground, Northampton; Umpires: Tony Clarkson and Alan Whitehead
Middlesex won the toss and elected to bat; Points: Middlesex 20, Northamptonshire 4

15–18 May	(H) Worcestershire	v	Essex	Essex won by 5 wickets
Scorecard	367 (99.5 overs); AJ Bichel 65 (83); JP Stephenson 3/60 (19 overs)		373 (135.5 overs); A Habib 117 (296); A Sheriyar 5/111 (42 overs)	County Ground, New Road, Worcester; Umpires: Ken Palmer and John Steele
Scorecard	140 (37 overs); Kabir Ali 24 (29); JP Stephenson 7/44 (14 overs)		135/5 (34.4 overs); A Flower 47 (62); A Sheriyar 3/46 (11.4 overs)	County Ground, New Road, Worcester; Umpires: Ken Palmer and John Steele
Worcestershire won the toss and elected to bat; Points: Essex 19, Worcestershire 6

24–27 May	(H) Durham	v	Gloucestershire	Match drawn
Scorecard	470/8d (140 overs); A Pratt 93 (129); MW Alleyne 3/76 (24 overs)		132 (53.2 overs); CG Taylor 37 (68); ID Hunter 3/62 (16 overs)	Riverside Ground, Chester-le-Street; Umpires: David Constant and Barrie Leadbeater
Scorecard			261/8 (127 overs) (f/o); RC Russell 78* (216); GD Bridge 4/50 (35 overs)	Riverside Ground, Chester-le-Street; Umpires: David Constant and Barrie Leadbeater
Durham won the toss and elected to bat; Points: Durham 12, Gloucestershire 6

24–27 May	Northamptonshire	v	(H) Nottinghamshire	Nottinghamshire won by 7 wickets
Scorecard	277 (71.4 overs); AL Penberthy 106* (136); AJ Harris 4/68 (20.4 overs)		207/8d (62 overs); N Boje 36 (67); CG Greenidge 5/66 (20 overs)	Trent Bridge, Nottingham; Umpires: Ken Palmer and John Steele
Scorecard	159 (20.3 overs); AS Rollins 60 (58); AJ Harris 7/54 (11 overs)		231/3 (52.5 overs); JER Gallian 111* (146); DM Cousins 2/88 (18.5 overs)	Trent Bridge, Nottingham; Umpires: Ken Palmer and John Steele
Northamptonshire won the toss and elected to bat; Points: Nottinghamshire 16, Northamptonshire 3.5

26–29 May	Derbyshire	v	(H) Essex	Essex won by 6 wickets
Scorecard	158 (49.4 overs); SD Stubbings 41 (69); AP Cowan 3/41 (12 overs)		168 (52.3 overs); DDJ Robinson 43 (106); Mohammad Ali 3/48 (18 overs)	County Ground, Chelmsford; Umpires: Mark Benson and Neil Mallender
Scorecard	199 (75 overs); KJ Dean 48 (106); RC Irani 3/33 (18 overs)		193/4 (33 overs); RC Irani 101 (76); Kevin Dean 2/57 (10 overs)	County Ground, Chelmsford; Umpires: Mark Benson and Neil Mallender
Essex won the toss and elected to field; Points: Essex 15, Derbyshire 3

31 May – 3 June	(H) Derbyshire	v	Glamorgan	Derbyshire won by 9 wickets
Scorecard	354 (92.3 overs); MJ Di Venuto 98 (107); SP Jones 3/75 (19.3 overs)		157 (55.4 overs); RDB Croft 34 (62); KJ Dean 7/42 (17.4 overs)	County Ground, Derby; Umpires: Pasty Harris and Vanburn Holder
Scorecard	5/1 (1.5 overs); AI Gait 4 (9); MS Kasprowicz 0/1 (1 over)		200 (50.5 overs) (f/o); A Dale 40 (84); DG Cork 4/50 (14.5 overs)	County Ground, Derby; Umpires: Pasty Harris and Vanburn Holder
Glamorgan won the toss and elected to field; Points: Derbyshire 18.25, Glamorgan 3

31 May – 3 June	Worcestershire	v	(H) Gloucestershire	Worcestershire won by 304 runs
Scorecard	287 (102.2 overs); WPC Weston 82 (212); AM Smith 4/61 (23 overs)		130 (55.5 overs); RC Russell 32* (73); Kabir Ali 5/32 (16 overs)	County Ground, Bristol; Umpires: Graham Burgess and Roy Palmer
Scorecard	324/3d (61.4 overs); A Singh 187 (190); AM Smith 1/51 (11 overs)		177 (56.5 overs CM Spearman 55 (77); Kabir Ali 5/34 (13.5 overs)	County Ground, Bristol; Umpires: Graham Burgess and Roy Palmer
Worcestershire won the toss and elected to bat; Points: Worcestershire 17, Gloucestershire 3

31 May – 3 June	Durham	v	(H) Middlesex	Match drawn
Scorecard	645/6d (153 overs); ML Love 251 (335); AW Laraman 2/89 (23 overs)		465 (167 overs); OA Shah 112 (279); M Davies 3/69 (33 overs)	Lord's, London; Umpires: John Holder and Mervyn Kitchen
Scorecard			194/5 (70 overs); EC Joyce 71 (122 overs); N Killeen 2/23 (12 overs)	Lord's, London; Umpires: John Holder and Mervyn Kitchen
Durham won the toss and elected to bat; Points: Durham 11, Middlesex 9

31 May – 3 June	(H) Northamptonshire	v	Essex	Essex won by 4 wickets
Scorecard	632 (146.2 overs); MEK Hussey 140 (185); ZK Sharif 4/98 (20 overs)		497/7d (150.5 overs); A Flower 103* (225); JF Brown 3/130 (51 overs)	County Ground, Northampton; Umpires: Nigel Llong and George Sharp
Scorecard	155 (44.2 overs); MEK Hussey 41 (73); JP Stephenson 4/25 (7.2 overs)		291/6 (49.5 overs); A Flower 92* (91); JF Brown 2/102 (16.5 overs)	County Ground, Northampton; Umpires: Nigel Llong and George Sharp
Northamptonshire won the toss and elected to bat; Points: Essex 19, Northamptonshire 7

==== June ====
12–15 June	Worcestershire	v	(H) Durham	Match drawn
Scorecard	250 (77.5 overs); DA Leatherdale 63 (131); NG Hatch 4/61 (22 overs)		243 (82.3 overs); DR Law 68 (174); AA Donald 5/77 (24 overs)	Riverside Ground, Chester-le-Street; Umpires: Ian Gould and Trevor Jesty
Scorecard	60/5 (19.4 overs); VS Solanki 17 (34); N Killeen 4/26 (9 overs)			Riverside Ground, Chester-le-Street; Umpires: Ian Gould and Trevor Jesty
Worcestershire won the toss and elected to bat; Points: Worcestershire 9, Durham 8

12–15 June	(H) Essex	v	Northamptonshire	Essex won by 9 wickets
Scorecard	498/9d (162 overs); RC Irani 207* (307); CG Greenidge 4/86 (34 overs)		204 (65 overs); MEK Hussey 67 (124); AP Cowan 4/62 (18 overs)	Valentines Park, Ilford; Umpires: Jeremy Lloyds and Peter Willey
Scorecard	68/1 (14 overs); WI Jefferson 33* (42); RSG Anderson 1/19 (4 overs)		361 (108.3 overs) (f/o); MEK Hussey 71 (155); JP Stephenson 4/87 (23 overs)	Valentines Park, Ilford; Umpires: Jeremy Lloyds and Peter Willey
Northamptonshire won the toss and elected to field; Points: Essex 20, Northamptonshire 3

12–15 June	Glamorgan	v	(H) Middlesex	Match drawn
Scorecard	369 (101.2 overs); MJ Powell 122 (205); AW Laraman 3/55 (19 overs)		403/9d (116.5 overs); SG Koenig 86 (138); MS Kasprowicz 4/108 (32 overs)	Lord's, London; Umpires: Barrie Leadbeater and Roy Palmer
Middlesex won the toss and elected to field; Points: Middlesex 12, Glamorgan 11

12–15 June	(H) Nottinghamshire	v	Derbyshire	Derbyshire won by 4 wickets
Scorecard	393 (99 overs); P Johnson 96 (134); KJ Dean 4/73 (22 overs)		392 (112.4 overs); MJ Di Venuto 79 (84); MN Malik 3/50 (18 overs)	Trent Bridge, Nottingham; Umpires: Jeff Evans and Alan Whitehead
Scorecard	175 (54.2 overs); P Johnson 34 (77); DG Cork 6/78 (27.2 overs)		181/6 (37 overs); CWG Bassano; N Boje 3/28 (9 overs)	Trent Bridge, Nottingham; Umpires: Jeff Evans and Alan Whitehead
Nottinghamshire won the toss and elected to bat; Points: Derbyshire 19, Nottinghamshire 7

26–29 June	Middlesex	v	(H) Glamorgan	Middlesex won by 8 wickets
Scorecard	633/7d (163.1 overs); Abdul Razzaq 203* (296); RDB Croft 4/151 (43 overs)		235 (56 overs); MP Maynard 66 (104); PCR Tufnell 6/96 (25 overs)	Sophia Gardens, Cardiff; Umpires: Pasty Harris and Nigel Llong
Scorecard	85/2 (17.2 overs); AJ Strauss 48 (52); DA Cosker 2/16 (3.2 overs)		481 (140 overs) (f/o); SP James 118 (253); Abdul Razzaq 3/104 (24 overs)	Sophia Gardens, Cardiff; Umpires: Pasty Harris and Nigel Llong
Middlesex won the toss and elected to bat; Points: Middlesex 20, Glamorgan 2

26–29 June	(H) Gloucestershire	v	Essex	Essex won by 3 wickets
Scorecard	383 (96.2 overs); KJ Barnett 106 (132); AP Cowan 5/68 (20.2 overs)		325 (127.1 overs); A Habib 66 (154); IJ Harvey 5/64 (22.1 overs)	Archdeacon Meadow, Gloucester; Umpires: Tony Clarkson and Ian Gould
Scorecard	322/7d (98 overs); RC Russell 107 (176); JP Stephenson 3/105 (29 overs)		381/7 (78.5 overs); DDJ Robinson 175 (226); IJ Harvey 6/90 (17.5 overs)	Archdeacon Meadow, Gloucester; Umpires: Tony Clarkson and Ian Gould
Gloucestershire won the toss and elected to bat; Points: Essex 18, Gloucestershire 7

26–29 June	Nottinghamshire	v	(H) Northamptonshire	Northamptonshire won by 6 wickets
Scorecard	489 (147.1 overs); CMW Read 127 (230); JF Brown		420 (104.1 overs); DJG Sales 179 (255); RJ Logan 4/64 (16.1 overs)	County Ground, Northampton; Umpires: Nigel Cowley and John Holder
Scorecard	172 (59.4 overs); P Johnson 70 (96); CG Greenidge 3/27 (9.4 overs)		242/4 (58.3 overs); MB Loye 104* (168); AJ Harris 2/36 (11 overs)	County Ground, Northampton; Umpires: Nigel Cowley and John Holder
Nottinghamshire won the toss and elected to bat; Points: Northamptonshire 20, Nottinghamshire 8

26–29 June	Durham	v	(H) Worcestershire	Worcestershire won by an innings and 308 runs
Scorecard	120 (39.5 overs); GJ Pratt 34 (34); Kabir Ali 4/31 (10 overs)		643/7d (148 overs); GA Hick 315* (386); N Killeen 3/107 (30 overs)	County Ground, New Road, Worcester; Umpires: Vanburn Holder and Allan Jones
Scorecard	215 (62.3 overs); DR Law 72* (100); Kabir Ali 4/77 (18 overs)			County Ground, New Road, Worcester; Umpires: Vanburn Holder and Allan Jones
Durham won the toss and elected to bat; Points: Worcestershire 20, Durham 2

==== July ====
3–6 July	Gloucestershire	v	(H) Derbyshire	Match drawn
Scorecard	179 (58.2 overs); APR Gidman 67 (126); DG Cork 5/67 (25 overs)		398 (104.2 overs); AI Gait 88 (164); AM Smith 4/87 (24.2 overs)	County Ground, Derby; Umpires: Barrie Leadbeater and Nigel Llong
Scorecard	225/7 (54 overs); CM Spearman 95 (169); DG Cork 3/44 (17 overs)			County Ground, Derby; Umpires: Barrie Leadbeater and Nigel Llong
Derbyshire won the toss and elected to field; Points: Derbyshire 11, Gloucestershire 6.25

3–6 July	Essex	v	(H) Glamorgan	Glamorgan won by 8 wickets
Scorecard	283 (123 overs); DDJ Robinson 72 (186); RDB Croft 5/71 (33 overs)		311 (84.3 overs); MJ Powell 90 (185); AJ Clarke 5/54 (17.3 overs)	St Helen's, Swansea; Umpires: Vanburn Holder and Mervyn Kitchen
Scorecard	139 (69.4 overs); A Flower 33 (180); SP Jones 5/28 (14.4 overs)		112/2 (31.2 overs); SP James 56 (75); AJ Clarke 1/25 (6 overs)	St Helen's, Swansea; Umpires: Vanburn Holder and Mervyn Kitchen
Essex won the toss and elected to bat; Points: Glamorgan 18, Essex 5

3–6 July	Worcestershire	v	(H) Middlesex	Match drawn
Scorecard	502/4d (123 overs); VS Solanki 153* (211); Abdul Razzaq 2/86 (33 overs)		417/8d (117.2 overs); PN Weekes 127* (233); GJ Batty 3/84 (30.2 overs)	Lord's, London; Umpires: Tony Clarkson and Barry Dudleston
Scorecard	99/5 (28 overs); VS Solanki 42* (67); Abdul Razzaq 3/28 (7 overs)			Lord's, London; Umpires: Tony Clarkson and Barry Dudleston
Worcestershire won the toss and elected to bat; Points: Worcestershire 11, Middlesex 10

3–6 July	Durham	v	(H) Northamptonshire	Northamptonshire won by 1 wicket
Scorecard	352 (109.4 overs); GJ Pratt 78 (115); DM Cousins 4/75 (22 overs)		0/0d (1 over); MEK Hussey 0* (6)	County Ground, Northampton; Umpires: John Hampshire and Trevor Jesty
Scorecard	Innings forfeited		353/9 (82.2 overs); GP Swann 109 (82); GD Bridge 4/102 (26.2 overs)	County Ground, Northampton; Umpires: John Hampshire and Trevor Jesty
Durham won the toss and elected to bat; Points: Northamptonshire 15, Durham 4

10–13 July	(H) Durham	v	Derbyshire	Durham won by 89 runs
Scorecard	191 (56 overs); GD Bridge 49 (85); KJ Dean 4/65 (19 overs)		96 (26.5 overs); MJ Di Venuto 57 (70); N Killeen 3/27 (10 overs)	Feethams, Darlington; Umpires: David Constant and Ken Palmer
Scorecard	203 (76.2 overs); N Peng 57 (125); Kevin Dean 4/67 (76.2 overs)		209 (56.5 overs); CWG Bassano 49 (57); NC Phillips 3/0 (4 overs)	Feethams, Darlington; Umpires: David Constant and Ken Palmer
Durham won the toss and elected to bat; Points: Durham 15, Derbyshire 3

10–13 July	(H) Essex	v	Worcestershire	Worcestershire won by 8 wickets
Scorecard	197 (87.2 overs); JP Stephenson 44 (85); GJ Batty 6/71 (34.2 overs)		373 (116.5 overs); A Singh 124 (201); AP Cowan 3/51 (30.5 overs)	Southchurch Park, Southend-on-Sea; Umpires: Trevor Jesty and Barrie Leadbeater
Scorecard	257 (116.1 overs); ML Pettini 58 (172); Kabir Ali 3/32 (11/1 overs)		82/2 (23.4 overs); GA Hick 34 (35); TJ Phillips 1/26 (7.4 overs)	Southchurch Park, Southend-on-Sea; Umpires: Trevor Jesty and Barrie Leadbeater
Essex won the toss and chose to bat; Points: Worcestershire 19, Essex 3

10–13 July	Gloucestershire	v	(H) Middlesex	Middlesex won by 5 wickets
Scorecard	388(141.3 overs); KJ Barnett 182 (421); PN Weekes 3/50 (26 overs)		301/9d (123.2 overs); AJ Strauss 82 (148); ID Fisher 5/87 (38 overs)	John Walker's Ground, Southgate; Umpires: Vanburn Holder and John Steele
Scorecard	152/2d (36 overs); THC Hancock 63* (105); I Jones 1/28 (6 overs)		241/5 (52 overs); AW Laraman 82* (95); MCJ Ball 2/54 (10 overs)	John Walker's Ground, Southgate; Umpires: Vanburn Holder and John Steele
Gloucestershire won the toss and elected to bat; Points: Middlesex 18, Gloucestershire 7

10–13 July	Glamorgan	v	(H) Nottinghamshire	Nottinghamshire won by 7 wickets
Scorecard	213 (56.5 overs); IJ Thomas 76 (112); PJ Franks 4/46 (15.5 overs)		328 (100.4 overs); GE Welton 115 (255); MS Kasprowicz 5/104 (33 overs)	Trent Bridge, Nottingham; Umpires: Neil Bainton and George Sharp
Scorecard	211 (72.1 overs); MP Maynard 55 (118); PJ Franks 5/51 (19 overs)		100/3 (24.4 overs); JER Gallian 55* (83); MS Kasprowicz 2/34 (8.4 overs)	Trent Bridge, Nottingham; Umpires: Neil Bainton and George Sharp
Glamorgan won the toss and elected to bat; Points: Nottinghamshire 18, Glamorgan 4

18–21 July	(H) Middlesex	v	Essex	Match drawn
Scorecard	538 (141.2 overs); SG Koenig 113 (220); TJ Phillips 4/102 (25 overs)		441 (129.4 overs); RC Irani 182* (346); Abdul Razzaq 7/133 (33.4 overs)	John Walker's Ground, Southgate; Umpires: Mark Benson and John Holder
Scorecard	426/4d (108 overs); OA Shah 148* (184); TJ Phillips 2/127 (32 overs)		53/1 (23 overs); WI Jefferson 31* (75); Abdul Razzaq 1/2 (1 over)	John Walker's Ground, Southgate; Umpires: Mark Benson and John Holder
Middlesex won the toss and elected to bat; Points: Middlesex 12, Essex 11

18–21 July	(H) Derbyshire	v	Nottinghamshire	Nottinghamshire won by 1 wicket
Scorecard	353 (105.3 overs); MJ Di Venuto 91 (110); N Boje 4/45 (25 overs)		240 (78.1 overs); KP Pietersen 103* (181); DG Cork 4/55 (25 overs)	County Ground, Derby; Umpires: Graham Burgess and Ian Gould
Scorecard	209 (67.2 overs); AI Gait 53 (100); N Boje 5/66 (23.2 overs)		323/9 (104.4 overs); JER Gallian 111* (284); G Welch 2/57 (18 overs)	County Ground, Derby; Umpires: Graham Burgess and Ian Gould
Nottinghamshire won the toss and elected to field; Points: Nottinghamshire 16, Derbyshire 7

19–22 July	(H) Gloucestershire	v	Glamorgan	Glamorgan won by 2 wickets
Scorecard	438 (128.5 overs); CG Taylor 126 (212); RDB Croft 3/73 (26.5 overs)		415 (104.4 overs); MP Maynard 140 (166); J Lewis 3/94 (24.4 overs)	College Ground, Cheltenham; Umpires: Barry Dudleston and Alan Whitehead
Scorecard	293 (78.2 overs); CM Spearman 180* (234); SP Jones 4/67 (14 overs)		320/8 (72.2 overs); MP Maynard 118* (104); MCJ Ball 3/93 (23 overs)	College Ground, Cheltenham; Umpires: Barry Dudleston and Alan Whitehead
Gloucestershire won the toss and elected to bat; Points: Glamorgan 20, Gloucestershire 8

19–21 July	Northamptonshire	v	(H) Worcestershire	Worcestershire won by 8 wickets
Scorecard	387 (109 overs); MEK Hussey 174 (291); MS Mason 3/59 (21 overs)		383 (95 overs); VS Solanki 116 (170); CG Greenidge 3/90 (25 overs)	County Ground, New Road, Worcester; Umpires: Pasty Harris and Roy Palmer
Scorecard	77 (35.3 overs); GL Brophy 14* (52); DA Leatherdale 4/23 (7.3 overs)		82/2 (13.1 overs); GA Hick 36* (24); CG Greenidge 2/28 (6 overs)	County Ground, New Road, Worcester; Umpires: Pasty Harris and Roy Palmer
Northamptonshire won the toss and elected to bat; Points: Worcestershire 19, Northamptonshire 7

24–27 July	Nottinghamshire	v	(H) Durham	Nottinghamshire won by 8 wickets
Scorecard	362 (101.1 overs); U Afzaal 103 (148); SJ Harmison 2/81 (24.1 overs)		116 (36.5 overs); BJ Hodge 21 (50); GJ Smith 4/24 (11.5 overs)	Riverside Ground, Chester-le-Street; Umpires: Pasty Harris and Barrie Leadbeater
Scorecard	83/2 (20.4 overs); GE Welton 42* (53); SJ Harmison 1/22 (7 overs)		328 (92.2 overs)(f/o); JJB Lewis 70 (136); AJ Harris 4/60 (18 overs)	Riverside Ground, Chester-le-Street; Umpires: Pasty Harris and Barrie Leadbeater
Nottinghamshire won the toss and elected to bat; Points: Nottinghamshire 19, Durham 3

24–27 July	(H) Essex	v	Glamorgan	Match drawn
Scorecard	231 (103 overs); DDJ Robinson 48 (81); AG Wharf 3/54 (22 overs)		575 (125.3 overs); SP James 249 (318); JE Bishop 3/103 (25 overs)	County Ground, Chelmsford; Umpires: Graham Burgess and Roy Palmer
Scorecard	514/4d (171 overs); A Flower 172* (317); SD Thomas 2/72 (24 overs)			County Ground, Chelmsford; Umpires: Graham Burgess and Roy Palmer
Essex won the toss and elected to bat; Points: Glamorgan 12, Essex 8

24–27 July	(H) Gloucestershire	v	Middlesex	Match drawn
Scorecard	494 (139.2 overs); THC Hancock 112 (158); Abdul Razzaq 5/125 (34.3 overs)		363 (108 overs); PN Weekes 102 (188); APR Gidman 3/33 (13 overs)	College Ground, Cheltenham; Umpires: John Hampshire and George Sharp
Scorecard	230 (82.3 overs); CM Spearman 35* (68); PCR Tufnell 8/66 (39 overs)		265/5 (80 overs); BL Hutton 88 (128); APR Gidman 2/18 (10 overs)	College Ground, Cheltenham; Umpires: John Hampshire and George Sharp
Gloucestershire won the toss and elected to bat; Points: Gloucestershire 12, Middlesex 10

25–28 July	Derbyshire	v	(H) Northamptonshire	Derbyshire won by 177 runs
Scorecard	388 (102.1 overs); AI Gait 175 (247); GP Swann 6/126 (27.1 overs)		210 (53 overs); JW Cook 88 (126); T Lungley 3/56 (15 overs)	County Ground, Northampton; Umpires: Mervyn Kitchen and John Steele
Scorecard	282 (70.1 overs); DG Cork 80 (81); JF Brown 4/88 (25.1 overs)		283 (64 overs); AL Penberthy 62 (92); KJ Dean 3/48 (15 overs)	County Ground, Northampton; Umpires: Mervyn Kitchen and John Steele
Derbyshire won the toss and elected to bat; Points: Derbyshire 19, Northamptonshire 4

==== August ====
7–10 August	Essex	v	(H) Derbyshire	Essex won by 140 runs
Scorecard	268 (75.1 overs); DDJ Robinson 69 (92); G Welch 3/34 (23 overs)		301 (90.1 overs); CWG Bassano 152 (191); JD Middlebrook 4/67 (20.1 overs)	County Ground, Derby; Umpires: John Hampshire and John Holder
Scorecard	324 (91.4 overs); DDJ Robinson 115 (226); G Welch 5/66 (29 overs)		151 (52.1 overs); SA Selwood 24 (69); JB Grant 4/45 (8 overs)	County Ground, Derby; Umpires: John Hampshire and John Holder
Derbyshire won the toss and elected to field; Points: Essex 17, Derbyshire 6

7–10 August	Gloucestershire	v	(H) Glamorgan	Match drawn
Scorecard	396 (98.4 overs); IJ Harvey 123 (103); AP Davies 3/90 (25 overs)		407 (100 overs); MJ Powell 135 (188); IJ Harvey 4/71 (20 overs)	Sophia Gardens, Cardiff; Umpires: Trevor Jesty and Mervyn Kitchen
Scorecard	7/0 (5 overs); CM Spearman 7* (15)			Sophia Gardens, Cardiff; Umpires: Trevor Jesty and Mervyn Kitchen
Glamorgan won the toss and elected to field; Points: Glamorgan 12, Gloucestershire 11

7–10 August	(H) Middlesex	v	Northamptonshire	Match drawn
Scorecard	400/4d (111.5 overs); OA Shah 172* (239); AL Penberthy 1/29 (22 overs)		231 (76.2 overs); ME Cassar 58 (157); AW Laraman 3/48 (18 overs)	Lord's, London; Umpires: Graham Burgess and Barrie Leadbeater
Northamptonshire won the toss and elected to field; Points: Middlesex 12, Northamptonshire 6

8–11 August	(H) Worcestershire	v	Nottinghamshire	Match drawn
Scorecard	201 (53.4 overs); A Singh 57 (99); SCG MacGill 5/63 (18.4 overs)		161 (42.4 overs); P Johnson 52* (89); MS Mason 5/50 (16.4 overs)	Chester Road North Ground, Kidderminster; Umpires: David Constant and Alan Whitehead
Scorecard	336/5d (71 overs); GA Hick 126 (156); GJ Smith 3/94 (21 overs)		292/5 (86 overs); U Afzaal 91 (143); GJ Batty 3/97 (32 overs)	Chester Road North Ground, Kidderminster; Umpires: David Constant and Alan Whitehead
Worcestershire won the toss and elected to bat; Points: Worcestershire 8, Nottinghamshire 6.25

14–17 August	(H) Derbyshire	v	Worcestershire	Worcestershire won by 9 wickets
Scorecard	190 (46.5 overs); CWG Bassano 85 (108); A Sheriyar 6/71 (15 overs)		320 (89.5 overs); SJ Rhodes 83 (166); KJ Dean 3/69 (25 overs)	County Ground, Derby; Umpires: Mark Benson and Nigel Cowley
Scorecard	243 (84.3 overs); SA Selwood 99 (186); GJ Batty 5/74 (34 overs)		115/1 (15.2 overs); VS Solanki 81* (56); T Lungley 1/13 (1.2 overs)	County Ground, Derby; Umpires: Mark Benson and Nigel Cowley
Derbyshire won the toss and elected to bat; Points: Worcestershire 18, Derbyshire 3

14–17 August	(H) Nottinghamshire	v	Middlesex	Nottinghamshire won by an innings and 73 runs
Scorecard	470 (118.4 overs); KP Pietersen 254* (252); CB Keegan 4/113 (29 overs)		138 (38.4 overs); DC Nash 40* (55); SCG MacGill 6/54 (12.4 overs)	Trent Bridge, Nottingham; Umpires: Jeff Evans and Trevor Jesty
Scorecard			259 (67.4 overs); AJ Strauss 110 (163); SCG MacGill 8/111 (24.4 overs)	Trent Bridge, Nottingham; Umpires: Jeff Evans and Trevor Jesty
Nottinghamshire won the toss and elected to bat; Points: Nottinghamshire 20, Middlesex 3

15–18 August	(H) Gloucestershire	v	Northamptonshire	Match drawn
Scorecard	422 (97.3 overs); MGN Windows 83 (171); ME Cassar 6/34 (10.3 overs)		746/9d (167 overs); MEK Hussey 310* (433); IJ Harvey 2/106 (25 overs)	County Ground, Bristol; Umpires: Nigel Llong and Roy Palmer
Scorecard	446/7 (136.5 overs); APR Gidman 117 (189); ME Cassar 4/100 (21.5 overs)			County Ground, Bristol; Umpires: Nigel Llong and Roy Palmer
Gloucestershire won the toss and elected to bat; Northamptonshire 12, Gloucestershire 10

16–19 August	(H) Durham	v	Glamorgan	Glamorgan won by 10 wickets
Scorecard	124 (42.1 overs); A Pratt 40 (75); MS Kasprowicz 6/47 (15.1 overs)		233 (70.5 overs); SP James 47 (85); M Davies 5/61 (22 overs)	Riverside Ground, Chester-le-Street; Umpires: Neil Mallender and Peter Willey
Scorecard	114 (38 overs); MA Gough 37 (65); MS Kasprowicz 5/58 (13 overs)		9/0 (3.3 overs); SP James 6* (13)	Riverside Ground, Chester-le-Street; Umpires: Neil Mallender and Peter Willey
Durham won the toss and elected to bat; Points: Glamorgan 16, Durham 3

21–24 August	Durham	v	(H) Essex	Essex won by 4 wickets
Scorecard	259 (86.1 overs); MA Gough 103 (215); JP Stephenson 2/20 (14 overs)		271 (92 overs); GR Napier 54* (52); N Killeen 4/49 (19 overs)	Castle Park Cricket Ground, Colchester; Umpires: Jeff Evans and George Sharp
Scorecard	332 (93.5 overs); GJ Pratt 65 (128); GR Napier 3/47 (16 overs)		322/6 (87 overs); JP Stephenson 100* (216); NC Phillips 4/103 (27 overs)	Castle Park Cricket Ground, Colchester; Umpires: Jeff Evans and George Sharp
Durham won the toss and elected to bat; Points: Essex 17, Durham 5

21–24 August	Derbyshire	v	(H) Middlesex	Derbyshire won by 204 runs
Scorecard	414 (116.5 overs); MJ Di Venuto 192* (303); AA Noffke 6/138 (33 overs)		304 (104.4 overs); EC Joyce 129 (253); G Welch 4/61 (25 overs)	Lord's, London; Umpires: Ken Palmer and Roy Palmer
Scorecard	301/7d (96 overs); MJ Di Venuto 113 (183); PCR Tufnell 5/80 (38.3 overs)		207 (84.1 overs); EC Joyce 51 (115); LJ Wharton 6/62 (31 overs)	Lord's, London; Umpires: Ken Palmer and Roy Palmer
Derbyshire won the toss and elected to bat; Points: Derbyshire 20, Middlesex 6

21–24 August	Glamorgan	v	(H) Northamptonshire	Northamptonshire won by 8 wickets
Scorecard	144 (40.4 overs); MP Maynard 43 (60); CG Greenidge 5/44 (12 overs)		375 (97.4 overs); AL Penberthy 99 (146); AP Davies 4/53 (13.4 overs)	County Ground. Northampton; Umpires: Mark Benson and Tony Clarkson
Scorecard	312 (83 overs); MS Kasprowicz 72* (96); CG Greenidge 3/68 (14 overs)		84/2 (17.2 overs); RA White 60* (54); MS Kasprowicz 1/16 (5 overs)	County Ground. Northampton; Umpires: Mark Benson and Tony Clarkson
Glamorgan won the toss and elected to bat; Points: Northamptonshire 19, Glamorgan 3

21–24 August	Gloucestershire	v	(H) Nottinghamshire	Nottinghamshire won by an innings and 84 runs
Scorecard	173 (63.5 overs); ID Fisher 57 (87); PJ Franks 4/33 (14 overs)		476 (105.4 overs); KP Pietersen 116 (137); J Lewis 3/100 (32 overs)	Trent Bridge, Nottingham; Umpires: Ian Gould and Vanburn Holder
Scorecard	219 (67 overs); RC Russell 45* (102); SCG MacGill 5/92 (29 overs)			Trent Bridge, Nottingham; Umpires: Ian Gould and Vanburn Holder
Gloucestershire won the toss and elected to bat; Points: Nottinghamshire 20, Gloucestershire 2.25

27–30 August	(H) Durham	v	Northamptonshire	Northamptonshire won by 7 wickets
Scorecard	240 (84.3 overs); NC Phillips 47 (65); MWH Inness 4/60 (22 overs)		236 (68.5 overs); GL Brophy 61* (142); SJ Harmison 4/83 (22.5 overs)	Riverside Ground, Chester-le-Street; Umpires: Ian Gould and Vanburn Holder
Scorecard	136 (45.1 overs); MA Gough 67 (114); CG Greenidge 6/40 (15.1 overs)		141/3 (24.3 overs); RA White 45 (33); GJ Muchall 2/52 (8 overs)	Riverside Ground, Chester-le-Street; Umpires: Ian Gould and Vanburn Holder
Northamptonshire won the toss and elected to field; Points: Northamptonshire 16, Durham 4

27–30 August	Nottinghamshire	v	(H) Glamorgan	Match drawn
Scorecard	464 (142.4 overs); JER Gallian 171 (338); DA Cosker 4/135 (43 overs)		495 (131 overs); SP James 184 (306); N Boje 6/128 (42 overs)	Colwyn Bay Cricket Club Ground; Umpires: Nigel Cowley and John Steele
Scorecard	274/5 (78 overs); UAfzaal 104* (174); DA Cosker 3/101 (29 overs)			Colwyn Bay Cricket Club Ground; Umpires: Nigel Cowley and John Steele
Nottinghamshire won the toss and elected to bat; Points: Nottinghamshire 12, Glamorgan 10

27–30 August	Middlesex	v	(H) Worcestershire	Middlesex won by 6 wickets
Scorecard	531 (145.3 overs); EC Joyce 125 (189); Kabir Ali 5/100 (33 overs)		319 (90.1 overs); GA Hick 101 (166); CB Keegan 4/47 (20.1 overs)	County Ground, New Road, Worcester; Umpires: John Hampshire and Alan Whitehead
Scorecard	193/4 (45.4 overs); EC Joyce 46* (57); DA Leatherdale 1/31 (9 overs)		401 (102.4 overs) (f/o); GA Hick 69 (141); CB Keegan 4/92 (24.4 overs)	County Ground, New Road, Worcester; Umpires: John Hampshire and Alan Whitehead
Middlesex won the toss and elected to bat; Points: Middlesex 19.75, Worcestershire 5

==== September ====
4–7 September	Middlesex	v	(H) Essex	Essex won by 6 wickets
Scorecard	295 (109 overs); BL Hutton 85 (145); GR Napier 2/45 (17 overs)		278 (88 overs); A Habib 65 (124); SJ Cook 4/27 (12 overs)	County Ground, Chelmsford; Umpires: Jeff Evans and Jeremy Lloyds
Scorecard	93 (38.1 overs); DC Nash 33 (49); JM Dakin 4/17 (9 overs)		111/4 (33.5 overs); A Flower 43* (74); SJ Cook 3/26 (10 overs)	County Ground, Chelmsford; Umpires: Jeff Evans and Jeremy Lloyds
Essex won the toss and elected to field; Points: Essex 17, Middlesex 5

4–7 September	(H) Gloucestershire	v	Derbyshire	Match drawn
Scorecard	192 (57.2 overs); THC Hancock 54 (71); G Welch 6/60 (20 overs)		187 (53.4 overs); LD Sutton 46 (96); AM Smith 5/69 (20.4 overs)	County Ground, Bristol; Umpires: Pasty Harris and Peter Willey
Scorecard	577/9d (129 overs); MGN Windows 144 (215); G Welch 3/147 (33 overs)		319/5 (86.2 overs); MJ Di Venuto 175* (265); ID Fisher 1/54 (25.2 overs)	County Ground, Bristol; Umpires: Pasty Harris and Peter Willey
Gloucestershire won the toss and elected to bat; Points: Gloucestershire 7, Derbyshire 7

5–8 September	(H) Glamorgan	v	Worcestershire	Match drawn
Scorecard	447 (130.5 overs); A Dale 127* (213); A Sheriyar 4/81 (30.5 overs)		381 (105.4 overs); SD Peters 130 (258); AP Davies 5/79 (23.4 overs)	Sophia Gardens, Cardiff; Umpires: David Constant and Ian Gould
Scorecard	181/2 (56 overs); DL Hemp 69* (169); Kabir Ali 1/15 (5 overs)			Sophia Gardens, Cardiff; Umpires: David Constant and Ian Gould
Glamorgan won the toss and elected to bat; Points: Glamorgan 12, Worcestershire 11

6–9 September	(H) Nottinghamshire	v	Durham	Match drawn
Scorecard	400/6d (105.1 overs); U Afzaal 103 (161); ID Hunter 2/83 (24 overs)		132 (46.3 overs); BJ Hodge 48 (73); AJ Harris 4/40 (13.3 overs)	Trent Bridge, Nottingham; Umpires: Barry Dudleston and Ken Palmer
Scorecard			153/5 (28 overs) (f/o); GJ Pratt 65 (53); SCG MacGill 3/52 (10 overs)	Trent Bridge, Nottingham; Umpires: Barry Dudleston and Ken Palmer
Nottinghamshire won the toss and elected to bat; Points: Nottinghamshire 12, Durham 5.75

11–14 September	Middlesex	v	(H) Derbyshire	Middlesex won by 73 runs
Scorecard	292 (107.3 overs); PN Weekes 88 (177); KJ Dean 6/59 (25.3 overs)		137 (42 overs); CWG Bassano 49 (83); AA Noffke 8/24 (15 overs)	County Ground, Derby; Umpires: David Constant and Trevor Jesty
Scorecard	150 (36.5 overs); D Alleyne 49* (73); JID Kerr 4/32 (9 overs)		232 (75.3 overs); CWG Bassano 44 (86); PCR Tufnell 5/35 (23 overs)	County Ground, Derby; Umpires: David Constant and Trevor Jesty
Middlesex won the toss and elected to bat; Points: Middlesex 17, Derbyshire 3

11–14 September	Essex	v	(H) Durham	Essex won by 10 wickets
Scorecard	463 (130.3 overs); A Habib 123 (201); I Pattison 3/41 (16.3 overs)		187 (66.4 overs); MA Gough 75* (201); JD Middlebrook 4/38 (18.4 overs)	Riverside Ground, Chester-le-Street; Umpires: Tony Clarkson and Pasty Harris
Scorecard	314 (84.1 overs); AM Thorpe 95 (150); JP Stephenson 3/31 (11 overs)		42/0 (8.3 overs); WI Jefferson 22 (30)	Riverside Ground, Chester-le-Street; Umpires: Tony Clarkson and Pasty Harris
Essex won the toss and elected to bat; Points: Essex 20, Durham 3

11–14 September	(H) Northamptonshire	v	Gloucestershire	Northamptonshire won by an innings and 59 runs
Scorecard	592/8d (165.1 overs); RA White 277 (325); AM Smith 3/96 (27 overs)		299 (89.3 overs); CM Spearman 107 (174); MS Panesar 4/43 (28.2 overs)	County Ground, Northampton; Umpires: Jeff Evans and Ken Palmer
Scorecard			234 (64.4 overs) (f/o); APR Gidman 66 (116); JF Brown 3/47 (15 overs)	County Ground, Northampton; Umpires: Jeff Evans and Ken Palmer
Northamptonshire won the toss and elected to bat; Points: Northamptonshire 20, Gloucestershire 4

11–14 September	(H) Nottinghamshire	v	Worcestershire	Nottinghamshire won by 114 runs
Scorecard	404 (118.4 overs); DJ Bicknell 112 (231); Kabir Ali 4/117 (28.4 overs)		397 (98.5 overs); SJ Rhodes 124 (199); AJ Harris 5/115 (26.5 overs)	Trent Bridge, Nottingham; Umpires: Ian Gould and Jeremy Lloyds
Scorecard	241 (76.3 overs); BM Shafayat 104 (193); MS Mason 4/37 (17.3 overs)		134 (37 overs); GA Hick 39 (57); AJ Harris 5/56 (15 overs)	Trent Bridge, Nottingham; Umpires: Ian Gould and Jeremy Lloyds
Nottinghamshire won the toss and elected to bat; Points: Nottinghamshire 20, Worcestershire 7

18–21 September	Nottinghamshire	v	(H) Essex	Essex won by 7 wickets
Scorecard	341 (86.5 overs); U Afzaal 134 (167); JD Middlebrook 3/69 (25 overs)		282 (88.4 overs); JP Stephenson 65 (127); AJ Harris 3/42 (20 overs)	County Ground, Chelmsford; Umpires: Barrie Leadbeater and John Steele
Scorecard	280 (76.3 overs); BM Shafayat 70 (124); JP Stephenson 3/45 (13 overs)		343/3 (68.2 overs); WI Jefferson 165 (214); PJ Franks 2/54 (14 overs)	County Ground, Chelmsford; Umpires: Barrie Leadbeater and John Steele
Essex won the toss and elected to field; Points: Essex 16.5, Nottinghamshire 6

18–21 September	(H) Glamorgan	v	Northamptonshire	Match drawn
Scorecard	348 (100 overs); MJ Powell 113 (187); MWH Inness 7/90 (26 overs)		430 (109.3 overs); AL Penberthy 130* (259); SD Thomas 5/104 (23.3 overs)	Sophia Gardens, Cardiff; Umpires: John Holder and Allan Jones
Scorecard	528/7d (104 overs); MP Maynard 151 (150); CG Greenidge 3/108 (15 overs)		242/6 (83 overs); MJ Powell 108* (254); RDB Croft 2/59 (19 overs)	Sophia Gardens, Cardiff; Umpires: John Holder and Allan Jones
Northamptonshire won the toss and elected to field; Points: Northamptonshire 12, Glamorgan 10

18–21 September	Durham	v	(H) Gloucestershire	Gloucestershire won by 10 wickets
Scorecard	216 (68.3 overs); BJ Hodge 73 (136); RJ Sillence 5/63 (15 overs)		359 (98.5 overs); APR Gidman 96 (138); SJ Harmison 5/65 (22.5 overs)	County Ground, Bristol; Umpires: Nigel Cowley and George Sharp
Scorecard	312 (87.4 overs); MA Gough 78 (145); ID Fisher 4/67 (21.4 overs)		171/0 (33.2 overs); CM Spearman 114* (111)	County Ground, Bristol; Umpires: Nigel Cowley and George Sharp
Durham won the toss and elected to bat; Points: Gloucestershire 19, Durham 4

18–21 September	(H) Worcestershire	v	Derbyshire	Worcestershire won by 1 wicket
Scorecard	246 (88 overs); AI Gait 58 (102); GJ Batty 5/60 (30 overs)		265 (68.3 overs); VS Solanki 81 (121); KJ Dean 4/75 (19.3 overs)	County Ground, New Road, Worcester; Umpires: Graham Burgess and Tony Clarkson
Scorecard	391 (107.3 overs); SA Selwood 77 (146); DA Leatherdale 4/50 (11 overs)		373/9 (69.4 overs); DA Leatherdale 89* (130); KJ Dean 5/143 (28 overs)	County Ground, New Road, Worcester; Umpires: Graham Burgess and Tony Clarkson
Derbyshire won the toss and elected to bat; Points: Worcestershire 17.5, Derbyshire 3.75

== Statistics ==
=== Division One ===
==== Most runs ====
Player	Team	Matches	Innings	Runs	Average	HS	100s	50s
Ian Ward	Surrey	16	29	1708	65.69	168*	7	7
Nick Knight	Warwickshire	10	19	1520	95.00	255*	5	5
Ed Smith	Kent	16	31	1233	42.51	154	2	8
Stuart Law	Lancashire	15	26	1216	52.86	218	2	6
Ali Brown	Surrey	16	26	1211	50.45	188	5	3

==== Most wickets ====
Player	Team	Matches	Overs	Wickets	Average	BBI	5W
Martin Saggers	Kent	15	547.3	79	21.54	6/39	6
Amjad Khan	Kent	16	485	63	31.80	6/52	4
Devon Malcolm	Leicestershire	16	477.5	60	30.43	7/76	4
Glen Chapple	Lancashire	16	539.3	54	29.51	6/30	3
Peter Martin	Lancashire	12	452	53	21.24	5/54	1

=== Division Two ===
==== Most runs ====
Player	Team	Matches	Innings	Runs	Average	HS	100s	50s
Michael Di Venuto	Derbyshire	15	28	1538	61.52	230	4	7
Craig Spearman	Gloucestershire	16	32	1388	49.57	180*	5	6
Michael Hussey	Northamptonshire	12	21	1379	72.57	310*	5	3
Darren Robinson	Essex	16	31	1289	42.96	175	4	5
Graeme Hick	Worcestershire	16	28	1262	52.58	315*	3	6

==== Most wickets ====
Player	Team	Matches	Overs	Wickets	Average	BBI	5W
Kevin Dean	Derbyshire	16	578	80	24.02	7/42	3
Andrew Harris	Nottinghamshire	13	392.4	63	22.39	7/54	3
Kabir Ali	Worcestershire	15	497.5	60	26.56	5/32	4
Dominic Cork	Derbyshire	8	323.1	57	16.68	6/51	5
Alamgir Sheriyar	Worcestershire	16	555.2	57	30.08	6/71	4

== See also ==
- 2002 Cheltenham & Gloucester Trophy
- 2002 Benson & Hedges Cup
- 2002 Norwich Union League
