= Sven Koenig =

Sven Koenig is the name of:

- Sven Koenig (computer scientist), computer scientist at the University of Southern California
- Sven Koenig (cricketer) (born 1973), South African cricketer
