= Nadeem Shahid =

Pakistani-born English first-class cricketer and businessman

Nadeem 'Nads' Shahid (born 23 April 1969 in Karachi, Pakistan) is a former Pakistani-born English first-class cricketer who played for Essex and Surrey. In his 148-game career as a right-handed batsman, he made 6453 runs at 31.02 with 9 hundreds. He played in sides which won the County Championship in five different seasons: Essex in 1991 and 1992, and Surrey in 1999, 2000 and 2002.

Nads left Surrey at the end of the 2004 season. Between 2003 and 2009, he played for Bromley in the Shepherd Neame Kent Premier League. He coached the Surrey Second XI between 2006 and 2009. It was announced on 4 March 2009, that he was leaving to run a multi-sports academy in South Africa. He later worked in the gambling, technology, and real estate sectors.

In 2026, he co-founded the Italia T10 Cricket League.
