= Steven Selwood =

English cricketer (born 1979)

Steven Andrew Selwood (born 24 November 1979) is a former English cricketer who played for Derbyshire between 2001 and 2004.

== Biography ==
Selwood was born on 24 November 1979, at Barnet, Hertfordshire, the son of Tim Selwood who played for Middlesex between 1966 and 1973. Selwood initially played for Middlesex and joined Derbyshire in the 2001 season. He was a left-handed batsman and a left-arm slow bowler. His highest score at the County level was 99.

In 2023, Selwood was jailed for 2 years and 7 months after hitting a 70-year-old female cyclist with his vehicle in Haslemere, Surrey, whilst 4 times the legal drink driving limit. He then proceeded to run over the victim's body with his SUV before fleeing the scene leaving her with life changing injuries.
