= Graeme Bridge =

English cricketer

Personal information
- Full name: Graeme David Bridge
- Born: 4 September 1980 (age 46); Sunderland, Tyne and Wear, England
- Batting: Right-handed
- Bowling: Slow left-arm orthodox

Domestic team information
- Years: Team
- 1999–2006: Durham

Career statistics
Competition	FC	List A
Matches	40	49
Runs scored	966	332
Batting average	17.88	15.09
100s/50s	0/3	0/1
Top score	52	50*
Balls bowled	6257	2096
Wickets	89	55
Bowling average	35.29	27.96
5 wickets in innings	1	-
10 wickets in match	-	-
Best bowling	6/84	4/20
Catches/stumpings	20/-	8/-
- Source: Cricinfo, 13 February 2014

Graeme David Bridge (born 4 September 1980) is a former English first-class cricketer.

Born in Sunderland, Bridge is a right-handed batsman and a left-arm slow bowler. He played for Durham and the Durham Cricket Board for the entirety of his first-class career. His debut came in the AXA County Championship in 1999, where he took the wicket of Gary Butcher. He never managed to establish himself on a regular basis and was released at the end of the 2006 season. Unable to find another club, he drifted away from the first-class game.

He plays in the North East Premier League for Blaydon Cricket Club, which he has captained. Despite many games being abandoned due to rain, he was a leading wicket taker in the 2007 season, as he has been in most seasons.
