= Andrew Gait =

British-South African cricketer (born 1978)

Personal information
- Full name: Andrew Ian Gait
- Born: 19 December 1978 (age 47); Bulawayo, Rhodesia
- Batting: Right-handed

Domestic team information
- Years: Team
- 1999–2001: Free State
- 2002–2004: Derbyshire
- First-class debut: 12 February 1999 Free State v Eastern Province
- Last First-class: 12 August 2004 Derbyshire v Yorkshire
- List A debut: 10 February 1999 Free State v Griqualand West
- Last List A: 18 July 2004 Derbyshire v Sussex

Career statistics
Competition	FC	LA	T20
Matches	63	38	2
Runs scored	3,093	858	2
Batting average	26.66	26.00	2.00
100s/50s	4/19	1/2	0/0
Top score	175	138*	2
Catches/stumpings	55/0	10/0	0/0

Andrew Ian Gait (born 19 December 1978) is a British–South African former cricketer who was born in Rhodesia. He is a right-handed batsman.

Gait has played in two Youth Test matches, scoring a half-century in his first, and also played at the Under-19s World Cup in 1998. His first domestic team was Free State, for whom he played between 1999 and 2001.

Signing to Derbyshire as a British citizen in readiness for the 2002 season was risky, as this mean Gait would count as an overseas player in South Africa and Free State had already lined up Jimmy Adams of the West Indies as its sole overseas player. Gait proved a revelation for the season, with an innings of 175 one of the highlights of his whole career. However, with trouble against swing bowlers, a problem for his game, his record in South Africa was better than his record in England.

Gait has appeared for Northamptonshire's Second XI in 2006, making a century on his Second XI Championship debut for the team.
