= Kevin Innes =

English cricketer

Personal information
- Full name: Kevin John Innes
- Born: 24 September 1975 (age 51); Wellingborough, Northamptonshire
- Batting: Right-handed
- Bowling: Right-arm medium-fast
- Role: Bowler

Domestic team information
- Years: Team
- 1994–2001: Northamptonshire
- 2002–2004: Sussex
- 2005: Bedfordshire

Career statistics
Competition	FC	LA	T20
Matches	45	86	5
Runs scored	1,256	815	22
Batting average	23.69	20.89	5.50
100s/50s	1/3	0/2	0/0
Top score	103*	55	10
Balls bowled	4,470	2,951	51
Wickets	79	83	1
Bowling average	31.15	32.12	72.00
5 wickets in innings	0	1	0
10 wickets in match	0	0	0
Best bowling	4/41	5/41	1/28
Catches/stumpings	15/–	25/–	0/–
- Source: CricketArchive, 12 June 2010

Kevin John Innes (born 24 September 1975) is a former English cricketer. He was a right-handed batsman and a right-arm medium-fast bowler who used to play for Northamptonshire and Sussex. He retired in 2005.

== Career ==
Innes started his career at Northamptonshire in 1994 as a teenager. In that season he played for England U19's and played 10 Test and ODI matches. After 7 years but only 21 first-class games at the County Ground, Kevin moved to Sussex in search of regular first team action. While at Sussex, he became the first and only 12th man to score a century as James Kirtley was to return from England duty and take his place half way through the match. After 24 first-class games in just two years, Innes retired due to injury but a year later turned out for Bedfordshire and other local league clubs. Innes returned to Northamptonshire as the Performance Coach/Fielding coach in 2008.
