= Tony Penberthy =

English cricketer (born 1969)

Personal information
- Full name: Anthony Leonard Penberthy
- Born: 1 September 1969 (age 57); Troon, Cornwall, England
- Nickname: Berth, Penbers, After
- Height: 6 ft 1 in (1.85 m)
- Batting: Left-handed
- Bowling: Right-arm medium
- Role: All-rounder

Domestic team information
- Years: Team
- 1989–2003: Northamptonshire

Career statistics
Competition	FC	LA
Matches	181	250
Runs scored	7,212	7,643
Batting average	30.05	25.33
100s/50s	10/40	0/24
Top score	132*	81*
Balls bowled	17,194	9,932
Wickets	231	251
Bowling average	39.18	30.45
5 wickets in innings	4	4
10 wickets in match	0	0
Best bowling	5/37	5/29
Catches/stumpings	108/–	63/–
- Source: ESPNcricinfo, 16 November 2009

Anthony Leonard Penberthy (born 1 September 1969) is a former cricketer who spent his entire career at Northamptonshire County Cricket Club. He joined the club in 1989. In 1992 he helped Northamptonshire to win the NatWest Trophy. He received his county cap in 1994 and was released in 2003. Penberthy continued Minor County cricket for Norfolk and Cornwall until 2006.
