= Aaron Laraman =

English cricketer

Personal information
- Full name: Aaron William Laraman
- Born: 10 January 1979 (age 47); Enfield, Greater London
- Batting: Right-handed
- Bowling: Right-arm fast-medium

Domestic team information
- Years: Team
- 1998–2002: Middlesex
- 2003–2005: Somerset

Career statistics
Competition	FC	LA	T20
Matches	47	45	7
Runs scored	1,378	412	35
Batting average	30.62	14.71	8.75
100s/50s	1/7	0/2	0/0
Top score	148*	51	28*
Balls bowled	5,555	1,729	123
Wickets	92	48	9
Bowling average	34.93	30.20	16.77
5 wickets in innings	1	2	0
10 wickets in match	0	0	0
Best bowling	5/58	6/42	4/15
Catches/stumpings	17/–	11/–	0/–
- Source: CricketArchive (subscription required), 22 December 2015

Aaron Laraman (born 10 January 1979) is an English cricketer. He is a right-handed batsman and a right-arm medium-fast bowler.

Born in Middlesex, Laraman began his career by playing for Middlesex County Cricket Club in 1998, though he also appeared in one youth Test match for England in 1997 before playing his debut match, managing another twelve months later.

Though he made his first-class debut in 1998, it was not until 2001 that he made his County Championship debut, in an innings defeat of Derbyshire. Despite moving in 2003 to Somerset, he was quickly included as a part of the Somerset first team. Laraman was a lower-order batsman with an overall first-class average with the bat and with the ball of just over thirty.

Laraman has played for Hertfordshire in the Minor Counties Championship. In 2007, he scored 512 runs at 56.88 and finished as the fourth highest runscorer in the championship.
