= Nick Phillips (cricketer) =

English cricketer

Personal information
- Full name: Nicholas Charles Phillips
- Born: 10 May 1974 (age 52); Pembury, Kent, England
- Batting: Right-handed
- Bowling: Right-arm off break

Domestic team information
- Years: Team
- 1993–1997: Sussex
- 1998–2003: Durham
- 2005–2013: Northumberland

Career statistics
Competition	FC	LA	T20
Matches	77	108	5
Runs scored	1,410	574	32
Batting average	15.49	10.07	16.00
100s/50s	0/4	0/0	0/0
Top score	58*	38*	26*
Balls bowled	13,097	4,601	120
Wickets	162	123	6
Bowling average	43.66	29.08	25.33
5 wickets in innings	5	0	0
10 wickets in match	1	0	0
Best bowling	6/97	4/13	2/22
Catches/stumpings	44/–	33/–	0/–
- Source: Cricinfo, 27 January 2025

Nicholas Charles Phillips (born 10 May 1974) is a former English cricketer. He was a right-handed batsman and a right-arm offbreak bowler. He played first-class cricket between 1993 and 2003 for Sussex and Durham in a career that lasted ten years. He played Twenty20 cricket in 2003, before joining Northumberland in 2005 in the Minor Counties Championship.

Phillips also played extensively for the Durham and Sussex Second XI's, particularly in representing them throughout Second XI trophies of the 90s and early 2000s. He had previously played two youth Test Matches for England Under-19s against the West Indian Under-19s in 1993.
