= Jonathan Dakin =

English cricketer (born 1973)

Jonathan Dakin (born 28 February 1973) is an English former first-class cricketer who played for Essex and Leicestershire between 1993 and 2004. He was born in Hitchin.
