= Lian Wharton =

English cricketer

Lian James Wharton (born 21 February 1977) is a former English cricketer who played for Derbyshire between 2000 and 2003. He was a left-handed batsman and a left-arm slow bowler.

Wharton was born in Holbrook, Derbyshire. He made his first-class debut in 2000, playing for Derbyshire against Cambridge University he failed to take a wicket in 25 economical overs. He played five matches in the County Championship in his debut season taking three wickets at an average of 82.66. He had more success against the touring West Indies claiming nine wickets in the match including a maiden five-wicket haul. His most productive season came in 2002 when he took 25 wickets at 27.80, including his career best figures of 6/62 against Middlesex at Lord's.

Wharton was released by Derbyshire at the end of 2003 season. He played club cricket for Ockbrook & Borrowash from 2004 until 2018.
