= Jeffrey Cook (cricketer) =

Jeff Cook
Personal information
- Full name: Jeffrey William Cook
- Born: 2 February 1972 (age 54); Sydney, New South Wales, Australia
- Batting: Left-handed
- Bowling: Right-arm medium
- Role: Batsman

Domestic team information
- Years: Team
- 2000–2004: Northamptonshire
- 2007–2009: New South Wales Country

Career statistics
Competition	FC	LA	T20
Matches	55	83	6
Runs scored	2,378	1,717	35
Batting average	29.35	25.25	5.83
100s/50s	3/13	2/6	0/0
Top score	137	130	18
Balls bowled	2,649	1,589	36
Wickets	36	48	1
Bowling average	38.63	28.25	60.00
5 wickets in innings	1	0	0
10 wickets in match	0	0	0
Best bowling	5/31	4/35	1/24
Catches/stumpings	20/–	22/–	3/–
- Source: CricInfo, 27 July 2009

Jeffrey William Cook (born 2 February 1972) was a professional cricket player who played primarily for Northamptonshire.

Cook started out in the New South Wales Under-17's team in the 1988/89 season and later travelled to England where he first played league cricket in 1993 and became engaged to English woman.

Cook was taken on by Leicestershire Second XI in 1997, and Derbyshire Second XI in 1998. The next year, Jeff Cook moved on to yet another county, and played for the Northamptonshire Second XI for a season before being promoted into the first team in 2000, receiving his County Cap in 2003. He played 144 matches for Northamptonshire, making a particular impact in the One-day competitions for his team, before leaving the club in 2004.

In 2001, Cook acted as a substitute fielder for England in a Test match against Pakistan at Lord's Cricket Ground as a substitute fielder in the absence of injured England captain Nasser Hussain.

Following his retirement from professional cricket and return to Australia, Cook discovered he was of Kamilaroi Australian Aboriginal descent.

Cook captained the New South Wales Aboriginal cricket side at the 2006 Imparja Cup and played for the New South Wales Country team from 2007 to 2009, including captaining the side in 2008/09.

Cook currently works as New South Wales Cricket Association's northern New South Wales Regional Cricket Manager.
