= Nick Thornicroft =

English cricketer

Personal information
- Full name: Nicholas David Thornicroft
- Born: 23 January 1985 (age 41); York, England
- Nickname: Mad Dog, Thorny
- Height: 5 ft 11 in (1.80 m)
- Batting: Left-handed
- Bowling: Right-arm fast-medium
- Role: Bowler

Domestic team information
- Years: Team
- 2001–2007: Yorkshire (squad no. 25)
- FC debut: 14 August 2002 Yorkshire v Lancashire
- Last FC: 16 May 2007 Yorkshire v Loughborough UCCE
- LA debut: 13 September 2001 Yorkshire v Gloucestershire
- Last LA: 31 July 2007 Yorkshire v Sri Lanka A

Career statistics
Competition	FC	LA	T20
Matches	8	15	1
Runs scored	54	52	–
Batting average	7.71	17.33	–
100s/50s	0/0	0/0	–
Top score	30	20	0*
Balls bowled	975	589	6
Wickets	17	17	0
Bowling average	36.17	35.88	–
5 wickets in innings	1	1	–
10 wickets in match	0	0	–
Best bowling	6/60	5/42	–
Catches/stumpings	2/–	3/–	0/–
- Source: CricketArchive, 22 August 2007

Nicholas David Thornicroft (born 23 January 1985) is an English first-class cricketer. He is a left-handed batsman and a right-arm medium-fast bowler, who played first-class cricket for Yorkshire County Cricket Club from 2002 until 2007.

== Career ==
Thornicroft made his debut for the Yorkshire Cricket Board in 2001, in the Cheltenham & Gloucester Trophy. He played in his debut first-class match for Yorkshire County Cricket Club in the 2002 County Championship, although Yorkshire finished that season in bottom place in the First Division, being relegated to Division Two for the 2003 season. Thornicroft held the lowest first-class bowling average of the Yorkshire team in 2002. He was the youngest ever Roses Match debutant, that year, when he played for Yorkshire against Lancashire at the age of 17.

Thornicroft appeared in only one first-class match during the following season, although he played in five Youth One Day Internationals and three Youth Tests during the calendar year of 2003, both during an English tour of Australia, before coming back home and playing two Youth Tests against South Africa. Thornicroft spent 2004 and 2005 playing little first-class cricket, although he continued in a consistent vein of form when sent out on loan to Essex's Second XI.

During the 2006 season, Thornicroft played no first-class matches. He was subsequently released by Yorkshire in 2007.

== Personal life ==
Thornicroft is a supporter of his hometown football club, York City F.C.
