= John Wood (cricketer, born 1970) =

English cricketer (born 1970)

Personal information
- Born: 22 July 1970 (age 56); Crofton, Wakefield, Yorkshire
- Batting: Right-handed
- Bowling: Right-arm fast-medium
- Role: Bowler

Domestic team information
- Years: Team
- 1990: Griqualand West
- 1991–2000: Durham
- 2001–2004: Lancashire
- First-class debut: 14 April 1992 Durham v Oxford University
- Last First-class: 26 June 2004 Lancashire v Northamptonshire
- List A debut: 27 October 1991 Griqualand West v Boland
- Last List A: 4 July 2004 Lancashire v Gloucestershire

Career statistics
Competition	FC	LA	T20
Matches	115	159	5
Runs scored	1762	614	15
Batting average	12.67	10.06	15.00
100s/50s	0/3	0/0	0/0
Top score	64	28*	15*
Balls bowled	17446	7049	95
Wickets	318	174	3
Bowling average	33.92	30.70	33.33
5 wickets in innings	11	1	0
10 wickets in match	0	0	0
Best bowling	7/58	5/49	1/15
Catches/stumpings	28/0	22/0	1/0
- Source: CricketArchive (subscription required), 3 January 2020

For the 18th century Surrey cricketer, please see John Wood (Surrey cricketer, born 1744)
For the 18th century Kent cricketer, please see John Wood (Kent cricketer, born 1745) John Wood (born 22 July 1970) is an English cricketer. He was a right-handed batsman and a right-arm medium-fast bowler who played for Griqualand West, Durham and Lancashire in a twelve-year career.

Wood began his cricketing career in 1990, when he played various cup competitions in South Africa, before he made his County Championship debut in England during the 1992 season. Playing in the lower-order, Wood took five wickets in his first bowling spell. He was only an intermittent starter during the following season, after some expensive bowling, though he hit his first half-century, in the first innings of the first Championship match he took part in, against Nottinghamshire. However, Durham found themselves at the bottom of the table come the end of the season, with just two wins in seventeen matches.

Wood spent most of the 1995 season out of the game, making just three County Championship appearances, and did not reclaim a first-team place until 1998, during which he took two five-wicket innings, despite not performing at his peak with the bat.

When the league split into two after the 1999 season, Durham qualified for the First Division, having placed eighth during the season, and consolidated their position in the first division in 2000. At the end of the 2000 season, Wood moved to Lancashire, having seen Durham relegated to the Second Division. This would prove a masterful transfer for Wood, as Durham without him would struggle to perform in the 2001 County Championship, finishing second-last with only Derbyshire below them, while Lancashire, with Wood's assistance, consolidated their position in Division One.

Over his final three years in first-class cricket, and, by this time, in his early-thirties, Wood played only infrequently. Following a couple of expensive bowling spells, he found himself out of the first-class team.

In nearly twelve years in first-class cricket, Wood remained a lower-order batsman, with frequently devastating spells of bowling to counter his low batting average.

Since 2006, Wood has been the Captain of Cleckheaton's Cricket Club, a club in the Bradford Premier League which is generally regarded as being one of the best leagues in the country in terms of the quality of cricket. Under his captaincy Cleckheaton won the league in 2013, for the first time in the club's history and in 2014 which was the club's 150th anniversary.
