= Danny Law =

English cricketer

Danny Law (born 15 July 1975) is a former English cricketer. Born in Lambeth, Law played for Sussex, Essex and Durham between 1993 and 2003.

During his debut List A performance for Sussex in June 1995, he managed to finish not out at number six by the close of innings in a 10-run victory. As he fell down the Sussex pecking order, he found himself out of the side in 1997, and instead playing for Essex.

During his ten-year career, he scored fifteen half-centuries and two centuries, at a 20.35 average. He conceded exactly 7000 first-class bowling runs in all first-class matches, finishing eight times with a five-wicket haul.

== Later career ==
Danny Law now plays for Westmeadows cricket club where he coached from 2014 to 2016. He later was part of a dual premiership era at Westmeadows in a team captained by his great mate Tarek 'Viv' Moughanie.
