= Ricaldo Anderson =

English cricketer

Personal information
- Full name: Ricaldo Sherman Glenroy Anderson
- Born: September 22, 1976 (age 48); Hammersmith, London, England
- Batting: Right-handed
- Bowling: Right-arm medium-fast
- Role: Bowler

Ricaldo Sherman Glenroy Anderson (born 22 September 1976) was an English first-class cricketer. Born in Hammersmith, he was a right-handed batsman and a right-arm medium-fast bowler. He participated in the 1999 and 2000 County Championships, the 2001 Cricinfo championship and the Frizzell County Championships of 2002 and 2003 before giving up first-class cricket.

Anderson also played in one Twenty20 Cup match in June 2003 for Northamptonshire, having also represented Essex during two non-consecutive tenures throughout a short career. In total, throughout his career, he made eight five-wicket innings, and bowled one ten-wicket match.
