= Matthew Whiley =

English cricketer

Personal information
- Full name: Matthew Jeffrey Allen Whiley
- Born: 6 May 1980 (age 46); Nottingham, Nottinghamshire, England
- Batting: Right-handed
- Bowling: Left-arm fast

Domestic team information
- Years: Team
- 2001–2003: Leicestershire
- 1998–2000: Nottinghamshire
- 1998–2000: Nottinghamshire Cricket Board

Career statistics
Competition	First-class	List A
Matches	18	23
Runs scored	72	28
Batting average	4.00	28.00
100s/50s	–/–	–/–
Top score	16	14*
Balls bowled	2,405	860
Wickets	27	18
Bowling average	66.55	41.83
5 wickets in innings	–	–
10 wickets in match	–	–
Best bowling	3/60	2/20
Catches/stumpings	3/–	5/–
- Source: Cricinfo, 28 October 2011

Matthew Jeffrey Allen Whiley (born 6 May 1980) is a former English cricketer. Whiley was a right-handed batsman who bowled left-arm fast-medium. He played for Nottinghamshire and Leicestershire during a five-year first-class career.

The Nottingham native, who has one Youth Test match, made his County Championship debut in the 1998 season, though he mostly appeared for the second team between then and 2001. Whiley started appearing more commonly for Leicestershire in April 2001, the season after their promotion from Division Two of the County Championship. He stayed with the first team until 2003, when Leicestershire were relegated and subsequently had a mass-clearout. Whiley was a tail-ending batsman for both his county sides.
