= Alamgir Sheriyar =

English cricketer (born 1973)

Personal information
- Born: 15 November 1973 (age 52); Birmingham, Warwickshire, England
- Batting: Right-handed
- Bowling: Left-arm fast-medium

Domestic team information
- Years: Team
- 1993–1995: Leicestershire
- 1996–2002: Worcestershire
- 2003–2004: Kent
- 2005: Worcestershire
- 2006: Leicestershire

Career statistics
Competition	FC	LA	T20
Matches	152	122	3
Runs scored	829	156	13
Batting average	8.29	9.17	–
100s/50s	0/0	0/0	–
Top score	21	19	9*
Balls bowled	25,890	4,682	60
Wickets	503	133	2
Bowling average	29.99	28.99	32.00
5 wickets in innings	23	0	0
10 wickets in match	3	0	0
Best bowling	7/130	4/18	1/18
Catches/stumpings	22/–	7/–	0/–
- Source: Cricinfo, 15 June 2022

Alamgir Sheriyar (born 15 November 1973) is a former English first-class cricketer. His last professional club was Leicestershire.

Sheriyar has had an impressive career taking over 600 wickets with his fast medium seam bowling. His career was spent mainly at Kent and Worcestershire but in 2006 Sheriyar returned to Grace Road, where he started his career.
