= Matthew Cassar =

Australian former cricketer

Matthew Edward Cassar (born 16 October 1972) is an Australian former cricketer. He was a right-handed batsman and a right-arm medium-fast bowler who represented Derbyshire from 1994 to 2000 and Northamptonshire from 2001 and 2002.

He made his first XI debut in 1994 and his first time in the Derbyshire dressing room coincided with one of the most successful times in the club's history, in 1998 Derbyshire appeared in the NatWest Cup final at Lords.

In May 2000 Matt prevented Michael Vaughan scoring his best innings by bowling a short-pitched ball and breaking his finger.

In 2001 Cassar left newly relegated Derbyshire to join Northamptonshire but he did not get much chance to put down firm roots as two years after moving a groin injury forced him to retire from the game.

During his professional career Cassar opted to follow the cricket season splitting his time in England and Australia to play for Sydney suburb first team Randwick Petersham.

His highest professional score was 277 not out.

After retiring Cassar set up in the financial services industry and now owns Finance Advice Centre and Finance Advice Group. He plays cricket in the summer for his village team Ockbrook and Borrowash and the regularly appears as a MCC player.

He lives in Derbyshire with his wife and two children.
