= Chad Keegan =

South African cricketer (born 1979)

Chad Blake Keegan (born 30 July 1979) is a South African former cricketer who played County Cricket for Middlesex and Sussex.

Born in Johannesburg, Keegan attended Durban High School. He suffered several injuries in 2004, a year after being voted Middlesex Player of the Year, including a double stress-fracture and sensitive joints. As a consequence, he found himself having to totally remodel his bowling action. Injury once again ruled him out of the majority of the 2005 season. He was released by Middlesex at the end of the 2007 season.

In 2009, he was given a trial by Sussex, and played for their 2nd XI. He played for the first team in the Friends Provident Trophy against Surrey. Sussex lost the match, but Keegan bowled seven overs, getting 2 wickets for 53 runs, and scoring 38 runs with the bat at a run-a-ball. Keegan was released by Sussex at the end of the 2010 season in which he took 21 wickets in 18 white-ball matches.

Keegan played Minor Counties cricket for Oxfordshire from 2011 until his retirement in 2016.
