= Trevor Ward (cricketer) =

English cricketer (born 1968)

Personal information
- Full name: Trevor Robert Ward
- Born: 18 January 1968 (age 58); Farningham, Kent, England
- Batting: Right-handed
- Bowling: Right arm off spin
- Role: Batsman

Domestic team information
- Years: Team
- 1986–1999: Kent
- 2000–2003: Leicestershire
- 2005–2013: Norfolk
- FC debut: 21 June 1986 Kent v Hampshire
- Last FC: 12 September 2003 Leicestershire v Kent
- List A debut: 6 July 1988 Kent v Warwickshire
- Last List A: 2 September 2003 Leicestershire v Glamorgan

Career statistics
Competition	FC	LA	T20
Matches	248	324	2
Runs scored	13,876	9,248	8
Batting average	34.43	30.32	4.00
100s/50s	29/77	10/59	0/0
Top score	235*	131	5
Balls bowled	1,149	414	–
Wickets	9	10	–
Bowling average	77.11	35.10	–
5 wickets in innings	0	0	–
10 wickets in match	0	0	–
Best bowling	2/10	3/20	–
Catches/stumpings	226/–	78/–	0/–
- Source: CricInfo, 10 March 2017

Trevor Robert Ward (born 18 January 1968) is a former English professional cricketer. A right-handed batsman and an occasional off-spin bowler. Ward played county cricket for Kent and Leicestershire. He was born in Farningham in Kent.

Ward played his last county match for Leicestershire in 2003. Subsequently, he played Minor Counties cricket for Norfolk until 2013.

As a junior, Ward captained the England under-19 cricket team on one occasion.
