= Paul Johnson (cricketer) =

English cricketer (born 1965)

Paul Johnson (born 24 April 1965) is a former English cricketer. He was a right-handed batsman and a right-arm medium-pace bowler. He is most well known for a 22-year career with Nottinghamshire. He was also the club's captain between 1996 and 1998.

Having appeared for the Nottinghamshire second XI as early as 1981, Johnson appeared in three Youth Test matches between 1982 and 1983, scoring a half-century in his second Youth test. Amongst Johnson's accolades are victories in the 1993 and 1995 Tetley Bitter cup. Johnson retired from playing cricket in 2002, he remained at Trent Bridge as a coach until 2013.

Sporting positions
Preceded by Tim Robinson	Nottinghamshire County cricket captain 1996–1998	Succeeded by Jason Gallian
