= Ashley Cowan =

English cricketer

- Born: 7 May 1975 (age 51)
- Occupation: cricketer

Ashley Cowan (born 7 May 1975) is a former English cricketer; his career spanned from 1995 to 2005. He is a right-handed batsman and a right-arm medium-fast bowler.

He played for Essex throughout the whole of his career between 1995 and his benefit season of 2006. His debut first-class match, against Derbyshire, came in August 1995. In the latter stages of his first-class career he fluctuated between Division Two and Division One with his team, finally finishing midtable in the 2005 Frizell County Championship second division.

He no longer plays first-class cricket as of 2006, his career accolades including a Benson and Hedges Cup final appearance during 1998 in which he finished not out at the close of the innings, thus sealing a comfortable win for his Essex side.

His benefit year was sponsored by a lap-dancing club called The Cave.
