= Archdeacon Meadow =

Cricket ground in Gloucester, England

Coordinates: 51°52′13.44″N 2°15′06.30″W

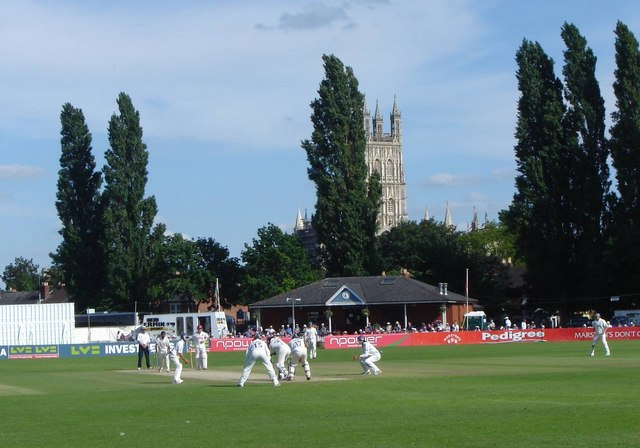
Gloucestershire v Northamptonshire, 2007

Archdeacon Meadow is a cricket ground in Gloucester, England. The land is owned by The King's School. The ground was first used by the Gloucestershire 1st XI in 1993. In 2008, the ground hosted a County Championship match against Warwickshire.

The ground has hosted 14 first-class matches and 11 List A matches.

Game Information:

Game Type	No. of Games
County Championship Matches	13
limited-over county matches	11
Twenty20 matches	0

Game Statistics: first-class:

Category	Information
Highest Team Score	Gloucestershire (695/5dec against Middlesex) in 2004
Lowest Team Score	Gloucestershire (101 against Worcestershire) in 1993
Best Batting Performance	Craig Spearman (341 Runs for Gloucestershire against Middlesex) in 2004
Best Bowling Performance	Craig White (8/55 for Yorkshire against Gloucestershire) in 1998

Game Statistics: one-day matches:

Category	Information
Highest Team Score	Gloucestershire (307/8 in 45 overs against Warwickshire) in 2003
Lowest Team Score	Gloucestershire (66 in 12.2 overs against Surrey) in 1996
Best Batting Performance	Craig Spearman (153 Runs for Gloucestershireagainst Warwickshire) in 2003
Best Bowling Performance	Neal Radford (5/57 for Worcestershire against Gloucestershire) in 1995
