= Victor Craven =

English cricketer

Victor John Craven (born 31 July 1980, Harrogate, Yorkshire, England) is an English first-class cricketer, who played for Yorkshire from 2000 to 2004.

A left-handed top order batsman, and occasional right arm medium pace bowler, he played in thirty three first-class matches, scoring 1,206 runs at 24.61, with a top score of 81 not out. He also took 15 wickets at 38.93, with a best of 2 for 18. In forty two one day matches, he scored 580 runs at 17.05, with an innings of 59 being his best, while he took 21 wickets at 16.80 each with a best of 4 for 22. His most successful innings in six Twenty20 games was 44 not out. He was a member of Yorkshire's County Championship winning squad in 2001. After a promising start he failed to consolidate his place in the team, and was released.

Afterwards he trained with Durham, but was not offered a contract after playing in six Durham Second XI games in 2005. Craven played for Cumberland in the Minor Counties Cricket Championship in 2005 and 2006.
