= Joe Grant (cricketer) =

Jamaican cricketer (born 1967)

Joe Grant (born 17 December 1967 in Jamaica) is a Jamaican-born cricketer who played national cricket for Jamaica and county cricket for Essex.

== Biography ==
Grant was born in Montego Bay in December 1968. A fast bowler, he trained at Haringey Cricket College from 1987 to 1990. Early in his career, he alternated playing domestic cricket in England in the summer and cricket in the West Indies in winter months. Grant played for Jamaica in the national side.

In 1992, he played for March Town in the Cambridgeshire League. The Sunday People opined that he was "so fast that sales of protective helmets have shot up among players of rival clubs". In 1993, Grant played for Royton in the Central Lancashire League. In 1996, he played for Padiham in the Vaux Ribblesdale League.

In 2000, Grant received a six-week ban for foul language leading to his team, Dunnington's, relegation. The club appealed the ban after Grant had been racially abused and riled up by a competitor during the match. The matter ended up in front of the UK's Commission for Racial Equality who investigated the league's handling of the matter.

Grant became a British citizen sometime before the 2001 season. That season he played for Cambridge. However, the team was penalised for fielding him as an English player when seven years had not elapsed since he had last played for Jamaica in 1995 against Trinidad. In the 2001 season, Grant also played in the premier leagues for Dunnington as well as in the County Championship for Essex.

In 2003, Grant played in an ODI win by county team Essex over visiting Pakistan at Chelmsford, with Grant taking the wicket of Yasir Hameed.

In 2004, Grant played 15 first class matches at Essex. This was followed by a turn at Burnham in the T-Rippon Mid-Essex League.
