= Matthew Bulbeck =

English cricketer (born 1979)

Cricket information
- Batting: Left-handed
- Bowling: Left-arm medium-fast

Career statistics
Competition	First-class	List A
Matches	47	31
Runs scored	821	117
Batting average	21.60	10.63
100s/50s	0/2	0/0
Top score	76*	24
Balls bowled	7,568	1,243
Wickets	152	35
Bowling average	30.36	29.34
5 wickets in innings	4	1
10 wickets in match	1	0
Best bowling	6/93	5/18
Catches/stumpings	9/–	5/–
- Source: CricketArchive, 3 September 2022

Matthew Paul Leonard Bulbeck (born 8 November 1979) is a former English First-class and List A cricketer who made appearances for Somerset during his senior career. He also made appearances at Youth Test and Youth One Day International level for England. He was primarily a bowler, but scored two First-class half centuries batting in the lower order. He won the NBC Denis Compton Award in both 1998 and 1999, but was forced to retire early from first-class cricket because of a back injury. He went on to work at the Somerset County Ground as an administrator.
