= Neil Burns =

English cricketer

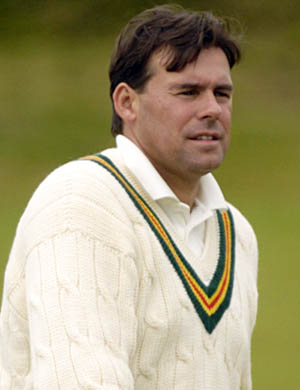
- Burns pictured in 2007

Cricket information
- Batting: Left-handed
- Role: Wicketkeeper-batsman

Domestic team information
- Years: Team
- 1985/86: Western Province B
- 1986: Essex
- 1987–1993: Somerset
- 1995–1999: Buckinghamshire
- 2000–2002: Leicestershire

Career statistics
Competition	First-class	List A
Matches	205	231
Runs scored	7,376	2,799
Batting average	30.47	20.28
100s/50s	7/40	0/8
Top score	166	90*
Catches/stumpings	478/38	238/48
- Source: ESPNcricinfo, 19 September 2018

Neil David Burns (born 19 September 1965) is a former English cricketer who played as a wicketkeeper/batsman at First-class and List A level for various clubs but spent the majority of his career at Leicestershire and Somerset.

Burns was born in Chelmsford, Essex, in 1965.

In 2004, following the end of his playing career, Burns re-formed the London County Cricket Club which had been founded by W. G. Grace—which he continues to manage.
