= Carl Greenidge =

English cricketer

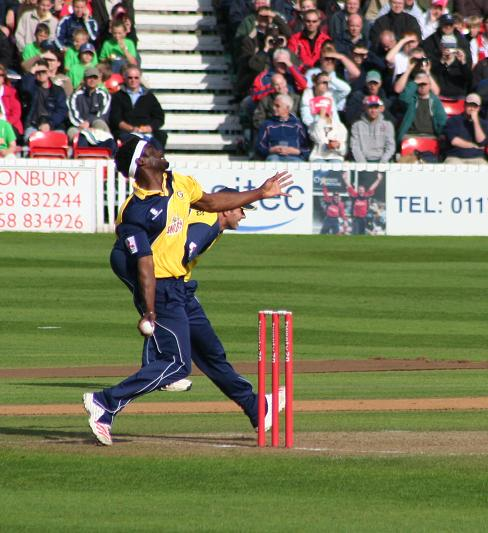
- Greenidge bowling for Gloucestershire in 2007

Personal information
- Full name: Carl Gary Greenidge
- Born: 20 April 1978 (age 48); Basingstoke, Hampshire, England
- Height: 5 ft 10 in (1.78 m)
- Batting: Right-handed
- Bowling: Right-arm fast-medium
- Role: Bowler
- Relatives: CG Greenidge (father)

Domestic team information
- Years: Team
- 1998–2001: Surrey
- 2002–2004: Northamptonshire
- 2005–2008: Gloucestershire

Career statistics
Competition	FC	LA	T20
Matches	50	67	31
Runs scored	444	147	34
Batting average	8.37	8.16	8.50
100s/50s	0/0	0/0	0/0
Top score	46	29	20
Balls bowled	7,500	2,849	621
Wickets	145	77	32
Bowling average	34.71	34.85	28.56
5 wickets in innings	6	0	0
10 wickets in match	0	0	0
Best bowling	6/40	4/15	3/15
Catches/stumpings	18/–	16/–	11/–
- Source: CricketArchive, 31 July 2016

Carl Gary Greenidge (born 20 April 1978) is an English cricketer. He is a right-handed batsman and a right-arm medium-fast bowler. He was born in Basingstoke, Hampshire, the son of Gordon Greenidge.

Greenidge played for Gloucestershire and has in the past represented both Northamptonshire and Surrey. He has played Twenty20 cricket since 2004. In 2000, he was a candidate for Cricket Writers' Young Cricketer Of The Year.

Following his playing career, Greenidge has worked as Head of Cricket at Bancroft's School coaching alongside John Lever until the latter's retirement in 2019.

Carl Greenidge played the role of his father, Gordon, in the 2021 Indian Hindi-language film 83.
