= Sven Koenig (cricketer) =

South African cricketer (born 1973)

Sven Gaetan Koenig (born 9 December 1973) is a South African cricketer.

Koenig was educated at Hilton College and the University of Cape Town. He played representative cricket for Ntl Nuff (1989–1991) and South African Schools (1991).

He represented Easterns, Gauteng, Western Province, MCC (2004) and Middlesex (2002–2004) as a dogged left-handed opening batsman and a right-arm off-break bowler. He played English county cricket as an Italian EU passport holder, before retiring from first-class cricket at 30 to launch a banking career in his native South Africa.
