= Gloucestershire County Cricket Club in 2005 =

Cricket club season

Gloucestershire Gladiators
2005 season
- Captain: Chris Taylor
- Ground(s): Bristol; Cheltenham; Gloucester

Gloucestershire County Cricket Club in 2005 are playing their cricket in Division One of both the County Championship and totesport League. They started the Championship at 18–1 to win it, and as one of the teams most likely to be relegated from it. So they were—only their five draws prevented them from finishing bottom, and they were the only team to lose to bottom-placed Glamorgan. By the end of August, they were relegated, with three games to spare. In the National League, they were never better than sixth at any time during the season, and lost three games in succession to be ninth before the final round of matches. They won their last match, but were still relegated due to a worse net run rate than Lancashire. They were thus the first club to suffer double relegation since Leicestershire in 2003. Their Twenty20 and C&G Trophy campaigns ended almost as early as they could have done—Gloucestershire did get past the first round of the C&G Trophy, beating Berkshire, but were knocked out by Surrey.

Gloucestershire played 18 first-class matches in 2005, winning two, drawing six and losing ten. In List A cricket, they won seven, lost ten and abandoned one game, while eight Twenty20 matches resulted in three wins, three losses and two no-results.

== Players ==
- Upul Chandana
- Ramnaresh Sarwan
- Malinga Bandara
- Steve Adshead
- Kadeer Ali
- Mark Alleyne
- James Averis
- Martyn Ball
- Ian Fisher
- Alex Gidman
- Carl Greenidge
- Tim Hancock
- Mark Hardinges
- Steve Kirby
- Jon Lewis
- James Pearson
- William Rudge
- Roger Sillence
- Stephen Snell
- Craig Spearman
- Phil Weston
- Matt Windows
- Tim Hancock

== Tables ==
=== Championship ===
2005 County Championship – Division One
Pos	Team	Pld	W	D	L	Pen	BP	Pts
1	Nottinghamshire	16	9	4	3	0	94	236
2	Hampshire	16	9	4	3	0.5	92	233.5
3	Sussex	16	7	6	3	0	102	224
4	Warwickshire	16	8	3	5	0.5	86	209.5
5	Kent	16	6	7	3	8.5	99	202.5
6	Middlesex	16	4	7	5	0.5	98	181.5
7	Surrey	16	4	9	3	8.5	97	180.5
8	Gloucestershire	16	1	5	10	2	72	104
9	Glamorgan	16	1	1	14	0	71	88.5

=== totesport League ===
2005 totesport League – Division One
Pos	Team	Pld	W	L	NR	Pts
1	Essex Eagles	16	13	1	2	56
2	Middlesex Crusaders	16	10	5	1	42
3	Northamptonshire Steelbacks	16	7	7	2	32
4	Glamorgan Dragons	16	6	6	4	32
5	Nottinghamshire Outlaws	16	6	7	3	30
6	Lancashire Lightning	16	6	9	1	26
7	Gloucestershire Gladiators	16	6	9	1	26
8	Worcestershire Royals	16	5	10	1	22
9	Hampshire Hawks	16	5	10	1	22

=== Twenty20 Group Stage (Midlands/Wales/West) ===
2005 Twenty20 Cup – Midlands/Wales/West Division
Team	M	W	L	NR	Pts	NRR
Northamptonshire Steelbacks	8	4	2	2	10	+1.17
Warwickshire Bears	8	4	3	1	9	+0.79
Somerset Sabres	8	4	3	1	9	+1.08
Gloucestershire Gladiators	8	3	3	2	8	-1.44
Worcestershire Royals	8	3	4	1	7	−0.46
Glamorgan Dragons	8	2	5	1	5	−1.09

== Match details ==
=== April ===
Their first first-class game was against Oxford UCCE, and Gloucestershire used it as batting practice. This was followed by a defeat by 48 runs in their first Championship game, away to Hampshire, and a defeat in the Sunday League at home to Northamptonshire. Gloucestershire then drew with Kent in the Championship.

==== MCC University Match: Oxford UCCE v Gloucestershire (9–11 April) ====
Match drawn

Oxford Universities Cricketing Centre of Excellence and Gloucestershire started their 2005 first-class season at the Parks in Oxford on 9 April. Gloucestershire won the toss and chose to bat. They made 305 for 9 declared off 89.2 overs, Phil Weston's 103 making him the first Gloucestershire centurion of the season. The declaration left 9 overs for Oxford to bat through until the end of the first day. They were 21 for 2 at the close.

On the second day, Oxford UCCE collapsed to 116 all out. Gloucestershire chose batting practice rather than to enforce the follow-on. At close they were 262 for 1, with Craig Spearman undefeated on 170. In the final over, which was the first one Stephen Moreton had bowled in first-class cricket, Spearman scored 6,6,6,6,4 and 6, with Spearman being dropped twice. The innings continued on the third and last day, and Gloucestershire closed on 490 for 4 declared from 101 overs. Spearman had made 216 before he retired out. There were few overs in the day left, but victory for Gloucestershire looked on the cards when they reduced Oxford UCCE to 24 for 6. Then a rearguard undefeated 64 from Knappett and 22 from Woods rescued some pride for Oxford UCCE and saw them through for the draw. (Cricinfo scorecard)

==== County Championship: Hampshire v Gloucestershire (13–16 April) ====
Hampshire (17pts) beat Gloucestershire (4pts) by 48 runs

Hampshire won the toss and elected to bat. There were 1,200 at the Rose Bowl to watch Simon Katich flawless 72 not out, as he was the only one able to cope with the conditions as Hampshire were all out for 197 before tea. Katich's innings was one of defence coupled with the odd drive, hook and pull. Hampshire's meagre total suggests they miss Kevin Pietersen, who performed so well for England in the one-dayers against Zimbabwe and South Africa over the winter. Pietersen said of his foot injury, "If I got a ball on my foot or I slipped I could be out for six to eight weeks. It's a bit tender and it's just a case of biding my time," he said. However, they did have to face good, fast-medium-pace bowling from Gloucestershire. Gloucestershire fared well in reply, and Shane Warne brought himself into the attack after only 18 overs. He took Craig Spearman's wicket when Spearman tried to sweep him, but Gloucestershire were sitting pretty at close on 118 for 2, 79 behind with 8 first-innings wickets remaining.

On the second day, Hampshire's bowlers, led by Warne, battled hard to get them back into the game. Except for Jon Lewis, who scored 40 off 61 balls batting at number ten, no one after the first three Gloucester batsmen scored more than ten. Their first innings ended for 221, just 24 ahead. Hampshire also struggled, and scored only 94 for their first 6 wickets. Warne and Sean Ervine survived the last six overs to push the score to 111 for 6 at close.

The third day saw yet another change in fortunes, which just about left Hampshire on top. The bowlers dominated the first two days, but the start of the third day was dominated by Hampshire's bowlers batting. Warne increased his score to 62, Chris Tremlett got 64 and Richard Logan 28 through aggressive batting as Hampshire closed their second innings on 275. This left Gloucestershire a challenging target of 252. Spearman and Phil Weston then put on 129 for the first wicket, only for five wickets to fall in quick succession before bad light stopped play, with the visitors on 149 for 5, needing 103 for victory.

It took only 18.4 overs on the fourth day for the match to be settled. With Billy Taylor finishing on 6 for 45 as Gloucester were all out for 203. After the game Hampshire's captain, Shane Warne, said, "We believe we can win from any position and it's so important to win your first few games. It was a tremendous team effort and everyone pulled their weight. This is the type of game you never forget. We found ourselves behind the eight ball at the start of every day but I always felt we were in with a chance if we could remove their openers." Cricinfo scorecard

==== National League: Gloucestershire v Northamptonshire (24 April) ====
Northamptonshire (4pts) beat Gloucestershire (0pts) by 9 runs

Northamptonshire Steelbacks batted first at Bristol. Two quick wickets reduced them to 14 for 2. It was a slow pitch that was not conducive to a high score, but they made their way to 202 for 7 off their 45 overs, thanks in part to Damien Wright smashing three sixes in four balls in the penultimate over, and thanks to Gloucestershire Gladiators dropping three catches.

In reply Northamptonshire took wickets regularly leaving the hosts on 111 for 5. There was a recovery of sorts after that, led by Alex Gidman's 71, but the hosts were always on the back foot from there. Eventually they finished on 193 for 8, a deficit of 9 runs. Four Northamptonshire bowlers got two wickets each, Welshman Steffan Jones getting them for the fewest runs, as he conceded only 29. (Cricinfo scorecard)

==== County Championship: Gloucestershire v Kent (27–30 April) ====
Gloucestershire (8pts) drew with Kent (11pts)

Play started at 4.30pm on the first day at Bristol. Kent progressed to 66 for 2 at close, with Rob Key (26) and Matthew Walker (22) the not out batsmen. On the second day, Key and Walker proceeded to their centuries. Key top-scored with 164, an innings which gave him a good shout for the No.3 spot in the England national team. When Walker was third man out with the score on 260, it precipitated a minor collapse, and Kent finished the second day on 339 for 6.

On the third day Kent lost their last four wickets in 40 minutes, finishing on 359. Gloucestershire, however, lost wickets steadily, and would have lost more had Kent not dropped four chances. Chris Taylor, the Gloucester captain, was the mainstay of the innings with a painstaking 66 from 173 balls. They finished the day on 208 for 7, 2 away from saving the follow-on, and most probably the match as well.

Gloucestershire added 40 runs on the last day, and then Kent batted out the day for a draw, finishing on 229 for 5 declared. Walker and Stevens had time to score half-centuries, and Geraint Jones had some useful batting practice in getting to 36 not out, but there was never much prospect of a result once the follow-on was saved. Kent captain David Fulton said, "If there had been any realistic chance of a result we would have been happy to go for it. But the pitch has just got flatter, and it was obvious we couldn't really hope to bowl them out quickly." (BBC scorecard)

=== May ===
Then on 2 May they beat Hampshire easily by 60 runs, before easily beat Berkshire over 2 days in the first round of the C&G Trophy. The next two games were Championship encounters: a win over Division One whipping boys, Glamorgan and a defeat at Lord's to Middlesex. Little one-day practice may have been one of the reasons they lost by three wickets to Surrey in the C&G Trophy, as they hadn't played a one-day game in two weeks. This one-day drought had also left them languishing near the bottom of the table, and a no-result against Middlesex didn't help. An innings defeat by Nottinghamshire followed, which left them eighth in Division One of the Championship at the end of May, and they ended the month with a League loss to Lancashire.

==== National League: Hampshire v Gloucestershire (2 May) ====
Gloucestershire (4pts) beat Hampshire (0pts) by 60 runs

Jon Lewis won the game for Gloucestershire Gladiators with 40 runs off 28 balls with the bat, and then taking out the Hampshire Hawks top order by taking 5 for 19 with the ball. Lewis had come in as a pinch hitter at number four after Matt Windows retired hurt. It was the Gladiators won the toss at the Rose Bowl, Southampton and, thanks to Lewis and 63 from Phil Weston, they scored 210 for 9. Hampshire's innings was stopped by Lewis, and despite a 55-run partnership between John Crawley and Nic Pothas, it was never enough, and they finished on 150 all out. (BBC scorecard)

==== C&G Trophy Round One: Berkshire v Gloucestershire (3–4 May) ====
Gloucestershire beat Berkshire by 85 runs to progress to Round Two of the C&G Trophy

Berkshire did well at their home ground in Reading. Despite 80 from Phil Weston, Gloucestershire only made 223 from 49.3 overs. Apart from a second-wicket partnership worth 118 between Weston and Chris Taylor, wickets fell regularly, leaving the minor county in with a clear chance. Berkshire progressed well in reply, reaching 69 for 2 off 14 overs when rain halted play for the day. On the second day, however, Berkshire soon capitulated to 138, as Sri Lankan spinner Upul Chandana took 4 for 27. The last eight wickets fell for 26 runs. (BBC scorecard)

==== County Championship: Glamorgan v Gloucestershire (6–9 May) ====
Gloucestershire (22pts) beat Glamorgan (4pts) by 7 wickets

Gloucestershire batted first at Cardiff and didn't regret it. With the top four all making good contributions and the three first partnerships all accounting for more than fifty runs, Chris Taylor smashed his way to 176 off 185 balls with four sixes, letting himself loose after getting his century and hitting over 70 runs with the last 43 balls he faced. By stumps, Gloucestershire were 439 for 8, and well in control of the game. England ODI bowler Alex Wharf did the brunt of the bowling effort with 30.1 overs, getting Taylor out eventually, and finishing with three wickets for 127 as Gloucestershire were bowled out for 466 early on the second day.

Matthew Elliott and Ian Thomas started the reply well for the hosts Glamorgan, putting on 40 for the first wicket before Thomas departed, but the Gloucestershire seamers Jon Lewis and Alex Gidman utilised the conditions well to reduce Glamorgan to 48 for 4. Healthy and quick contributions from the lower order, led by wicketkeeper Mark Wallace, who made a half-century to lift Glamorgan to a slightly respectable 239. Following on, Glamorgan played more sensibly, and stumps were drawn when Glamorgan lost their first wicket of their second innings, Ian Thomas for 40.

The third day, however, was the day of the spinners. After Matt Elliott (123), David Hemp (57) and Michael Powell (39) lifted Glamorgan to 274 for 2 and a lead of 47, Sri Lankan leg-spinner Upul Chandana and all-rounder Ian Fisher shared the last eight wickets between them for 71 runs, Chandana finishing with five for 117 and Fisher with four for 89, and resulting in a target of 119 for Gloucestershire to win. Glamorgan had some hope when their spinners, Dean Cosker and Robert Croft took three wickets of their own to see Gloucestershire to 59 for 3 at close on day 3, but on the morning of day 4, there just wasn't any help left and Gloucestershire's experienced batsman Tim Hancock could guide the visitors to the target with a fine 41 not out. (Cricinfo scorecard)

==== County Championship: Middlesex v Gloucestershire (11–13 May) ====
Middlesex (21pts) beat Gloucestershire (4pts) by 340 runs

Middlesex won convincingly at Lord's. Ed Joyce continued with his good form, top-scoring with 75 as Middlesex made 390 all out, their highest score of the season so far, on the first day. Gloucestershire faced out a maiden over before the close of play. On the second day, in conditions still favouring the batsmen, 5 wickets from Alan Richardson and 4 from Melvyn Betts saw the visitors crumble to 232. Only Craig Spearman passed 30 for Gloucestershire, as he spent 144 minutes making 69. Middlesex were 93 for 3 in their second innings at stumps.

Middlesex batted for another 62 overs, allowing Owais Shah to make his century, and Ed Joyce 93, before declaring on 342 for 6, leaving Gloucestershire a theoretical 501 to win. Their batting was worse than in their first innings as another 3 wickets from Richardson and 4 from Betts saw them all out for a miserable 160. (Cricinfo scorecard)

==== C&G Trophy Round Two: Gloucestershire v Surrey (17 May) ====
Surrey beat Gloucestershire by three wickets to progress to the quarter-finals of the C & G Trophy

Surrey overcame their poor one-day form, with four losses in four National League games, to reach the quarter-finals in a close game at Bristol against Gloucestershire. Surrey won the toss and fielded first, restricting Gloucestershire to 230 for 8 after most of the Surrey bowlers got wickets. Chris Taylor made 74 and top-scored, but it was the all-rounder Alex Gidman who managed to keep his head calm, scoring 58 not out while the tail crashed to single figure scores around him. In reply, Surrey struggled to 110 for 4, losing wickets at key moments, but Rikki Clarke (62 not out) stood tall towards the end, taking the winning runs off James Averis with three balls and three wickets remaining in the innings. (Cricinfo scorecard)

==== National League: Gloucestershire v Middlesex (22 May) ====
Match abandoned – Gloucestershire (2pts), Middlesex (2pts)

Just as at nearby Taunton in Somerset, where Somerset were playing Lancashire in the Championship, rain hit Bristol heavily, as Gloucestershire Gladiators were hoping to climb out of the bottom of the table. The visitors from Middlesex Crusaders were struggling, faltering to 95 for 5 after 21 overs with only Owais Shah hitting more than 20—he made a half-century. Then rain intervened, and Gloucestershire were set 87 in 13 overs—however, when seven overs of the chase was over and Gloucestershire had made 40 for 2, rain stopped play again and the game was called off completely. (Cricinfo scorecard)

==== County Championship: Gloucestershire v Nottinghamshire (25–27 May) ====
Nottinghamshire (22pts) beat Gloucestershire (4.5pts) by an innings and 27 runs

At Bristol, the visiting captain Stephen Fleming from Nottinghamshire won the toss and chose to bat—a wise choice, as it turned out, as only Mark Hardinges took wickets, but he conceded many runs in the process, finishing with four for 115. Gloucestershire were toothless, conceding 28 runs off no-balls, while their No. 5 David Hussey was deprived of a century when the team collapsed around him, finishing on 98 not out. With a run rate of above four in their 469 all out, they were putting pressure on the hosts, who started sedately without losing wickets. However, a spell from Ryan Sidebottom resulted in three wickets falling with only one run being scored, and that gave Northamptonshire the edge in the game. Gloucestershire were eventually bowled out for 250, as Mark Ealham removed the tail with three for 26 off 16 overs (with ten maidens), and, being forced to follow on, Gloucestershire lost both openers before stumps to have scored three runs for two wickets.

The rot continued on day 3, as Ealham and Sidebottom took more wickets, and Gloucestershire crashed to 56 for 5. Despite a lower-order partnership worth 77 between James Pearson (68) and Sri Lankan international Upul Chandana (49) for the seventh wicket, Gloucestershire were still all out for 192—27 runs short of making Nottinghamshire bat again. To compound the misery, Gloucestershire lost half a point for a slow over rate, and the result seemed to cement them near the bottom of the Division 1 table, as they lost contact with Middlesex and Sussex to settle in eighth place. (Cricinfo scorecard)

==== National League: Gloucestershire v Lancashire (30 May) ====
Lancashire (4pts) beat Gloucestershire (0pts) by six wickets

Lancashire Lightning were lethal with the ball at Bristol as they beat Gloucestershire Gladiators by six wickets in a low-scoring encounter. Dominic Cork was the most punishing bowler, taking four for 14 off nine overs (including five wides) as Gloucestershire whimpered to 86, as veteran wicketkeeper Mark Alleyne top-scored with 24 not out. Alleyne was one of two Gloucestershire batsmen to make it into double figures. Jon Lewis, who had earlier on in the day been called up to the England ODI squad to meet Bangladesh and Australia, took three for 40, but it was not enough to stop Lancashire from cruising to the target with nearly 25 overs to spare. (Cricinfo scorecard)

=== June ===
The first game in June was a 3-day defeat away to Kent, and the 3-day defeat trend continued with an innings defeat at home to Warwickshire. Their losing form continued with two League defeats, to Essex and Northamptonshire.

==== County Championship: Kent v Gloucestershire (1–3 June) ====
Kent (18pts) beat Gloucestershire (3pts) by 7 wickets
Kent deducted 8pts because of the poor quality of the pitch

Kent may have some cause to regret playing this match in their outground at Maidstone even though they secured a comfortable victory against Gloucestershire, as they ended up being fined 8pts for the poor quality of the pitch. Gloucestershire could only manage 183 in their first innings, and only 98 in their second, while Irish wicket-keeper Niall O'Brien held nine catches. Kent's bowlers all contributed, as Simon Cook, Andrew Hall and Amjad Khan took five wickets each. Kent made 204 in their first innings despite Mark Hardinges 5 for 51, and lost only 3 wickets in reaching their second-innings target of 78. No batsman made 40 in the entire match, and despite some overs on the first day being lost to rain, the game was over in 3 days. (Cricinfo scorecard)

==== County Championship: Gloucestershire v Warwickshire (10–13 June) ====
Warwickshire (22pts) beat Gloucestershire (4pts) by an innings and 2 runs

A massive batting effort from Warwickshire compounded with a remarkable second-innings bowling spell from Heath Streak and a spineless Gloucestershire effort in general, saw Warwickshire move to the top of the Division One table. It started all right enough for the hosts at Bristol, as a marathon three-hour fifty from James Pearson and 23 extras sent them to 254 on the first day. However, a partnership of 151 between Ian Bell and Jonathan Trott lifted Warwickshire into the ascendancy, as no Gloucestershire bowler found the required bite, and everyone of the top ten except Michael Powell went into double figures as Warwickshire amassed 473 in nearly 150 overs. Then, Streak stole the show. As Streak grabbed four wickets in the first hour, Gloucestershire were quickly 20 for 5, and despite a rescuing effort from Mark Alleyne and Ian Fisher, Gloucestershire were all out for 217 – two runs short of making Warwickshire bat again. (Cricinfo scorecard)

==== National League: Essex v Gloucestershire (17 June) ====
Essex (4pts) beat Gloucestershire (0pts) by 55 runs

Andy Flower smashed the Gloucestershire Gladiators' bowlers all around The County Ground in Chelmsford as he and Ronnie Irani paired up for 139 to send Essex Eagles to a final score of 271 for 7. Flower hit 127 not out off 93 balls, as Upul Chandana especially got to be punished, conceding 64 runs from 9 overs. In reply, Alex Tudor snared out a couple of early wickets, Gloucestershire lost wickets at regular intervals, and even a quick hit-out from Chandana – who scored 32 off 30 balls – was not enough to take a win from the Eagles, their fifth of the season. Essex thus went top of the National League table along with Middlesex. (Cricinfo scorecard)

==== National League: Northamptonshire v Gloucestershire (19 June) ====
Northamptonshire (4pts) beat Gloucestershire (0pts) by five wickets

Gloucestershire Gladiators and the Northamptonshire Steelbacks were both forced to win this relegation clash, the last one-day game these sides would play before the Twenty20 Cup began. Winning the toss and batting, Gloucestershire crumbled from 53 for 0 to 55 for 4 in a collapse very reminiscent of what happened at their home ground on that same day in the England vs Australia game, but 63 from Mark Hardinges rescued them to a competitive total of 215 for 9. Bilal Shafayat and Tim Roberts looked to secure the victory, pairing up for 166 for the first wicket, but two wickets from Martyn Ball and two run-outs saw a collapse to 207 for 5. Shafayat, however, kept his cool, seeing the hosts to the target with ten balls to spare. (Cricinfo scorecard)

=== Twenty20 Cup Group stage ===
Gloucestershire stayed in Northampton for the Twenty20 game, and lost again. Two home wins followed, though, over Glamorgan and Worcestershire, and they looked very solid after their initial setback – after two no-results and yet another win over Worcestershire had ensured that they had grabbed eight points from six games. However, their bowling let them down in the last two games, first allowing whipping boys Glamorgan to take a thumping ten-wicket victory at Cardiff, and then handing Somerset the highest team score in Twenty20 Cup history, with 228 for 5 – which sent Somerset through and Gloucestershire out.

==== Northamptonshire v Gloucestershire (22 June) ====
Northamptonshire (2pts) beat Gloucestershire (0pts) by 81 runs

The Gloucestershire Gladiators took a massive beating by the Northamptonshire Steelbacks in their match at Milton Keynes. Despite Gloucestershire's Martyn Ball taking two for 18 from four overs, positively economical, five no-balls and the fact that 16 overs had to be found from bowlers other than Ball allowed Northamptonshire to run away to 224 for 5 – a Twenty20 Cup record . David Sales top-scored for the hosts with 78 not out, while Australian Damien Wright paired up with him for 84 for the sixth wicket, scoring an unbeaten 38 of his own. Gloucestershire were in trouble from the start, as opening batsman Craig Spearman was run out for a duck, and when Wright ripped out two more wickets, the Gladiators were 10 for three. Four wickets from Ben Phillips resulted in a serious collapse, as Gloucestershire were all out for 143. (Cricinfo scorecard)

==== Gloucestershire v Glamorgan (24 June) ====
Gloucestershire (2pts) beat Glamorgan (0pts) by seven wickets

Glamorgan Dragons were out of luck at Bristol, as their top order collapsed to the bowling of Carl Greenidge. Only a last-wicket partnership between Robert Croft and Dean Cosker ensured that Glamorgan batted out 20 overs, as they were 70 for 8 at one point but finished on 128 for 9. However, it was never enough. Croft took two wickets with his off-spin, but Craig Spearman's 39 built the platform as Gloucestershire Steelbacks eased to victory with 17 balls to spare. (Cricinfo scorecard)

==== Gloucestershire v Worcestershire (26 June) ====
Gloucestershire (2pts) beat Worcestershire (0pts) by five wickets

This was a game of two batsmen. After Simon Kirby had ripped out two Worcestershire Royals wickets early on, to finish with figures of two for 15 from four overs, the Royals had been 24 for 3. Zander de Bruyn then hit eight fours and three sixes in his 76 not out, lifting the Royals to 162 for 6 and setting a potentially tricky target. However, William Weston replied with 73 not out of his own, and despite only Craig Spearman passing 20 of the other batsmen, Weston secured a win for Gloucestershire with two balls to spare. (Cricinfo scorecard)

==== Gloucestershire v Warwickshire (28 June) ====
No result; Gloucestershire (1pt), Warwickshire (1pt)

37 balls were delivered before Gloucestershire Steelbacks and Warwickshire Bears were forced to abandon the game at The County Ground, Bristol due to rain. Warwickshire were 44 for 1 after 10 leg-byes and 16 not out from Nick Knight when the game was stopped. (Cricinfo scorecard)

==== Gloucestershire v Somerset (1 July) ====
No result; Gloucestershire (1pt), Somerset (1pt)

Only thirteen overs of play was possible at The County Ground, Bristol. By that time, two Somerset Sabres batsmen had departed for golden ducks – Graeme Smith and James Hildreth – and Somerset were 61 for 7. Gloucestershire Gladiators would have fancied their chances, but rain intervened to spoil the party. (Cricinfo scorecard

==== Worcestershire v Gloucestershire (2 July) ====
Gloucestershire (2pts) beat Worcestershire (0pts) by nine wickets

The visitors Gloucestershire Gladiators recorded an easy victory at New Road as Worcestershire scored only 100 all out in their innings, Stephen Moore top-scoring with only 23. Martyn Ball took three for 24, but all the bowlers got wickets, and Mark Alleyne conceded only six runs in four overs. Although they lost Craig Spearman with the score on 22, the Gladiators knocked off their target easily, with nine wickets and five overs to spare. (Cricinfo scorecard)

==== Glamorgan v Gloucestershire (5 July) ====
Glamorgan (2pts) beat Gloucestershire (0pts) by ten wickets

Glamorgan Dragons broke their streak of four successive losses with a comfortable victory at Sophia Gardins. The two brothers David Harrison and Adam Harrison took two wickets each for Glamorgan, as Gloucestershire Gladiators crumbled to 57 for 7. Jon Lewis and Mark Alleyne shared a 68-run stand, but a quick burst of wickets from Robert Croft and Andrew Davies had them all out for 128 at Sophia Gardens. Croft and Matthew Elliott both made fifties as Glamorgan Dragons knocked off the runs with ten wickets and 7.3 overs to spare, helped by five no-balls and four wides from the Gloucestershire bowlers. (Cricinfo scorecard)

==== Somerset v Gloucestershire (6 July) ====
Somerset (2pts) beat Gloucestershire (0pts) by 95 runs

Somerset Sabres made it through to the quarter-finals after recording a massive score of 228 for 5 in twenty overs – the highest team total in Twenty20 Cup history, eclipsing a record set a couple of weeks earlier. The most economical bowler was Steve Kirby, and he conceded 35 runs in four overs, while the other four where all taken for more than 40 runs. Graeme Smith top-scored with 53, Ian Blackwell made 45, and James Hildreth recorded 32 off 10 balls – 28 from six shots to the boundary and four from the other four deliveries. Somerset's innings featured eight sixes and twenty extras. Gloucestershire Gladiators, who were second in the Midland/Wales/West group before this game at Taunton, had to go for expansive strokes, and were all out in sixteen overs, Gareth Andrew taking four for 22 while Craig Spearman top scored with 35 off 17 balls. Keith Parsons also contributed bowling-wise, taking three for 12. (Cricinfo scorecard)

=== July ===
Indeed, conceding high scores were a part of Gloucestershire's game in July. In the County Championship, they let away 603 against Surrey, but saved the draw after trailing by 325 runs on first-innings. In the National League, Middlesex amassed 333 for 4 at Southgate – only to see that Gloucestershire scored even more, as they recorded only their second win in seven games, and that against second-placed Middlesex. A Bangladesh A side visited Bristol next, and Gloucestershire eventually won that friendly game by 130 runs despite being 72 for 7 in their first innings. However, they lost in the National League to Worcestershire, to go bottom of the Division 1 table. Gloucestershire were contented with a draw in their next match against Sussex in the Championship, never attempting the chase for 314 in 74 overs.

==== County Championship: Gloucestershire v Surrey (8–11 July) ====
Gloucestershire (8pts) drew with Surrey (12pts)

At tea on day 2, it seemed inconceivable that, barring rain, this game would go to a draw, but Surrey failed to turn the screw and were denied victory by Alex Gidman and Steve Adshead. Surrey won the toss and opted to bat, and after Scott Newman and Richard Clinton had added 136 for the first wicket, things looked promising for the visitors to Bristol. With seven fifties – numbers 7, 8 and 9 Azhar Mahmood, Martin Bicknell and Harbhajan Singh all adding more than 75 runs – but no century, Surrey amassed 603 before being bowled out at lunch, none of the four bowlers conceding less than 100 runs. This was also the highest total without a century in England, breaking a 106-year-old record by Nottinghamshire, and the second highest total without a century in first-class cricket.

Then, a burst of three wickets from Rikki Clarke sent Gloucestershire to the ropes at 83 for 5. Alex Gidman, Mark Hardinges and Ian Fisher lifted the first-innings total to 288, still trailing by 325, but Gidman and wicket-keeper Adshead had more tricks saved for the second innings. Gloucestershire batted a marathon 157.2 overs against the Surrey spin-bowling – Harbhajan bowling 49 of those – Gidman made a six-hour 142, Adshead pairing up with him for a little over four of those hours to add 93, and the second-innings total read 494. Surrey were eventually set a target of 180 to win in eleven overs. and not even Twenty20 style hitting from Azhar Mahmood, who hit three fours and one six in his 26 could send them to that, as they finished with 84 for 3. (Cricinfo scorecard)

==== National League: Middlesex v Gloucestershire (17 July) ====
Gloucestershire (4pts) beat Middlesex (0pts) by four wickets

Middlesex Crusaders amassed 333 for 4 in 45 overs – that's nearly seven and a half runs an over, well over the average five in 45-over games – and still lost to Gloucestershire Gladiators. It didn't look as the score would be as big at first, as Paul Weekes with 81, Ed Smith with 53, Owais Shah with 55 and Scott Styris with 42 kept the score ticking at roughly a run a ball. However, Kenyan-born Jamie Dalrymple slashed four sixes and seven fours in an unbeaten 24-ball 60 to up the run rate late on, and Gloucestershire's Jon Lewis, who earlier in the summer had played ODIs for England, conceded 86 runs in nine overs. Gloucestershire always kept up with the run rate, however, as Phil Weston, Craig Spearman and Matt Windows lifted Gloucestershire to 275 for 2, and despite Paul Weekes' late burst of four wickets, Mark Alleyne and Ian Fisher shared a stand of 18 to see Gloucestershire to the target. (Cricinfo scorecard)

==== Tour Match: Gloucestershire v Bangladesh A (20–22 July) ====
Gloucestershire won by 130 runs

Bangladesh A, still without a win on tour of England, shocked Gloucestershire initially at Bristol. Shahadat Hossain took three wickets for the tourists, and Syed Rasel and Talha Jubair also chipped in, as Gloucestershire imploded to 72 for 7. However, 83 from wicketkeeper Stephen Snell lifted them to 232, before Jon Lewis and James Averis dug into the tourists to reduce them to 29 for 3. However, Tushar Imran played his way to his fourth first-class century, a career-best 119, to give the tourists a slender lead of 19 after a 122-run fourth-wicket stand between Tushar and Alok Kapali. However, Gloucestershire were determined to prove their class the second time around, and after losing Kadeer Ali for 1 after half an hour they were in control, batting their way to 330 for 5 in just 65.1 overs before declaring as Alex Gidman recorded a 94-ball century. Sri Lankan overseas player Malinga Bandara then took five for 45 with his leg-spin as the tourists imploded from 106 for 2 to 181 all out. (Cricinfo scorecard)

==== National League: Gloucestershire v Worcestershire (24 July) ====
Worcestershire (4pts) beat Gloucestershire (0pts) by 20 runs (D/L method)

Despite being strengthened by their new acquisition from the West Indies, Ramnaresh Sarwan, Gloucestershire Gladiators still went down at Bristol. Having been put in to bat by Worcestershire Royals after rain delayed the start, Kabir Ali dug out a wicket with his first ball, and despite 51 from Matt Windows Gloucestershire still only posted 168 for 9. In reply, Vikram Solanki and Stephen Moore batted 12.4 overs without loss before rain intervened, and Worcestershire were then 20 runs ahead of their Duckworth/Lewis target. (Cricinfo scorecard)

==== County Championship: Sussex v Gloucestershire (26–29 July) ====
Sussex (7pts) drew with Gloucestershire (7pts)

Rain damaged both the first and the second day at The County Ground, Hove, and only 93 overs were possible in two days. Yet, 18 wickets fell on those two days, 14 of which on the second day. Sussex resumed play on the second day with an overnight score of 97 for 4, and immediately lost two wickets to swing bowler Jon Lewis, who ended with four for 62. However, a quick blast of four fours, one six and one single from Jason Lewry lifted Sussex to 191 all out. The Gloucestershire reply never got off the mark, as seven batsmen were out in single figures and the highest partnership was 33. Rana Naved-ul-Hasan got good output with the ball, however, taking four for 26 as Gloucestershire ended on 142.

Despite early breakthroughs from Lewis and Steve Kirby Sussex fought back, as Michael Yardy, Murray Goodwin and Chris Adams all passed 40 to see Sussex to 200 for 4 at stumps on day three. Lewis took four wickets on the fourth morning to bowl Sussex out for 267, Yardy completing his century before he was caught off Ian Fisher, setting up a potentially exciting finish with 317 required off 74 overs. Gloucestershire never attempted the chase, however, and Sussex failed to get them out, despite 19 overs of spin from Mushtaq Ahmed which yielded three wickets for 25. (Cricinfo scorecard)

=== August ===
However, that was followed up by another loss, by 178 runs to Hampshire. They quickly got themselves up again, however, as they recorded a five-wicket National League win over the same team on Sunday – before crumbling to 87 all out in the same competition on Tuesday, losing to Nottinghamshire.

The team played another match with Sussex in the Championship, this time at Cheltenham College, and were duly beaten by 226 runs, and relegation from Division One was now almost a certainty. However, the Sunday brought a pleasant surprise, as they thumped Essex by 60 runs to move out of the relegation zone. A Championship draw with Surrey came in the third week of August, before a win over Lancashire sent them out of the relegation zone in the National League, but a loss to Glamorgan the following day immediately set them back. The month ended with Gloucestershire becoming the first team to lose to Glamorgan in 2005.

==== County Championship: Gloucestershire v Hampshire (3–6 August) ====
Hampshire (21pts) beat Gloucestershire (7pts) by 178 runs

Gloucestershire bowlers Steve Kirby, Jon Lewis and Malinga Bandara threatened to make a mockery of Shaun Udal's decision to have a bat at Bristol, as Hampshire fell to 81 for 7, with five batsmen out for single-figures. However, a 257-run partnership – a Hampshire record for the eighth wicket – between Nic Pothas and Andy Bichel turned the match around, as Lewis was carted for 112 runs in his 20 overs, despite five of them being maiden overs. Hampshire finished their innings on 385 all out, after Pothas had made 139 and Bichel 138, and Gloucestershire struggled initially with the bat, losing their first two wickets for 25 runs (admittedly with Kirby filling the role of nightwatchman).

On the second day, Alex Gidman posted 115 and Steve Adshead 73 to lift Gloucestershire from 191 for 6 to 363. Hampshire then collapsed again, falling to 23 for 3 (including the wicket of nightwatchman Chris Tremlett) before John Crawley and Shane Watson rescued them with a 120-run partnership, as spinners Bandara and Ian Fisher toiled away to little effect. Hampshire eventually declared on 388 for 7, with four of their batsmen passing fifty, which left Gloucestershire 411 to win in a day. That never looked likely, but attritional cricket from Ramnaresh Sarwan and Matt Windows lifted Gloucestershire to 156 for 2, and then Gidman came in to add a further 39 for the fourth wicket. However, Shane Watson got a vital breakthrough with the wicket of Gidman, Shaun Udal unleashed a spell of furious off-spin on the tail, taking six for 61, and Gloucestershire were bowled out with an hour to spare. (Cricinfo scorecard)

==== National League: Gloucestershire v Hampshire (7 August) ====
Gloucestershire (4pts) beat Hampshire (0pts) by five wickets

Mark Hardinges took four for 40 to help Gloucestershire Gladiators record a thumping victory over Hampshire Hawks, after tying down and frustrating the opponents' batsmen. Hardinges was the main culprit as Hampshire lost their last nine wickets for exactly 100 runs to post a total of 178, despite Nic Pothas, Sean Ervine and Shane Watson all making at least 40. In reply, William Weston and Matt Windows paired up for 106 runs for the second wicket, and not even Chris Tremlett, who took three for 34, could stop Gloucestershire from reaching the target with more than ten overs to spare. (Cricinfo scorecard)

==== National League: Gloucestershire v Nottinghamshire (9 August) ====
Nottinghamshire (4pts) beat Gloucestershire (0pts) by eight wickets

Gloucestershire Gladiators were gracious hosts at Cheltenham College, as they allowed themselves to be beaten by eight wickets and bowled out for 87 by Nottinghamshire Outlaws. Despite the low scores, it took a whole 35.1 overs to get them out, Ramnaresh Sarwan and Mark Alleyne gluing to the crease for scores of 15 off 46 balls and 11 off 28 balls respectively. All the bowlers got wickets, with the exception of spinner Samit Patel, who nevertheless got fine figures of 5–2–7–0. Pakistani batsman and part-time leg-spinner Younis Khan, with only ten List A wickets to his name, got three for 5 – including Sarwan and Alleyne – to wrap up Gloucestershire's resistance. In reply, Anurag Singh hit an unbeaten 30 and Younis Khan 28 not out as Nottinghamshire eased to the target in half the time allotted. (Cricinfo scorecard)

==== County Championship: Gloucestershire v Sussex (10–13 August) ====
Sussex (21pts) beat Gloucestershire (4pts) by 226 runs

Sussex recorded a comfortable win at Bristol against Gloucestershire, to escape further from the relegation zone – in a match completely dominated by Sussex' overseas bowlers. Murray Goodwin, Chris Adams and Matt Prior all made quick half-centuries, to propel Sussex to 365, while the Gloucestershire spinners shared seven wickets – Malinga Bandara taking four for 64 and Ian Fisher three for 93. Indeed, spinners were to take the brunt of the bowling, as Gloucestershire had only gone in with two specialist seamers – and one of them, Steve Kirby, broke down with an injury in his fifth over of the day.

Gloucestershire resumed the second day on 28 for 1, and players from the Indian subcontinent were to dominate the day's proceedings, as they took all of the thirteen wickets. Sussex' Pakistani spinner Mushtaq Ahmed took six for 65, while Rana Naved-ul-Hasan added three to his overnight tally of one to end with four for 53. No Gloucestershire batsman passed 50, as they trailed by 141 on first innings. Sussex took on seven overs from the seamers, before Michael Ball and Bandara started another marathon spell. The openers survived to pair up for 67, but then Bandara took a burst of wickets, finishing the day with four for 58 as Sussex closed the second day's play on 128 for 4.

On the third day, Prior and Michael Yardy made a fifth wicket-partnership worth 141 runs, and Sussex could declare with a lead of 405 runs, after Bandara was taken for runs to end with the expensive innings bowling analysis of 26–3–112–4. Again, Gloucestershire subsided to the Pakistani bowlers, but for once an English-born bowler got his name up on Gloucestershire's scorecard – Alex Gidman was lbw to James Kirtley for 7. Rana took five and Mushtaq three as Gloucestershire collapsed to 179, Ramnaresh Sarwan making 117 of those. (Cricinfo scorecard)

==== National League: Gloucestershire v Essex (14 August) ====
Gloucestershire (4pts) beat Essex (0pts) by 60 runs

Essex Eagles imploded to 122 all out in chase of a small target to bring a tiny measure of excitement into the National League title race, while Gloucestershire Gladiators recorded a rare victory to take them out of the relegation zone. Batting first, Gloucestershire were bowled out for 182 in only 44.1 overs, Matt Windows top-scoring with 57 while Darren Gough and Grant Flower took three wickets each. Malinga Bandara and Martyn Ball shared the highest partnership of the match, adding 59 runs for the ninth wicket to carry Gloucestershire from 118 for 8. Essex then crawled to 49 for 7, James Averis finishing with amazing figures of 8–2–9–2, while Ball and Mark Alleyne also grabbed two wickets each. Despite 46 from New Zealand all-rounder Andre Adams, Essex were all out for 122 when Adams was caught off the bowling of Mark Hardinges. (Cricinfo scorecard)

==== County Championship: Surrey v Gloucestershire (16–19 August) ====
Surrey (12pts) drew with Gloucestershire (11pts)

Surrey's bowlers Azhar Mahmood and Mohammad Akram shared out the first three wickets for only one solitary run, as Gloucestershire looked to collapse in the first innings at The Oval. Alex Gidman fought back, however, making 84 from number six, while Steve Adshead shepherded the tail with 148 not out, and Gloucestershire made their way to 350. Surrey and Pakistan spinner Saqlain Mushtaq ended with one for 110 in his first first class game of the season. Surrey initially struggled with the bat, as opener Mark Butcher only made six before he was dismissed by William Rudge.

However, Gloucestershire's bowlers failed to get consistent bite, and Mark Ramprakash smashed his way past 1,000 first class runs in the season with a season-best 192. He was well supported by Graham Thorpe, Jonathan Batty, Ali Brown and Tim Murtagh, who all made scores above 30, and Surrey finished their first innings with a total of 463 in the middle of the first session on day three, with wickets shared out among the Gloucestershire bowlers. Surrey got an early breakthrough by dismissing Craig Spearman, but Kadeer Ali and Ramnaresh Sarwan stuck to the crease, adding 151 for the second wicket. However, three wickets from Nayan Doshi late on day three seemed to turn the game Surrey's way, with Gloucestershire leading by 181 runs for the loss of six wickets at stumps. However, the fourth day's play was rained off, and the match ended in a draw. (Cricinfo scorecard)

==== National League: Lancashire v Gloucestershire (22 August) ====
Gloucestershire (4pts) beat Lancashire (0pts) by six wickets

Three centuries were recorded at Old Trafford, as Gloucestershire Gladiators snatched a victory over the hosting Lancashire Lightning after being regarded with no chance earlier on. The Gladiators won the toss and got immediate success, as Jon Lewis dismissed Mal Loye with the second ball of the day, but pretty much everything went against Gloucestershire from then on, as Stuart Law, Mark Chilton and Andrew Symonds flayed the bowling to all corners. Symonds took 88 balls for his century, and went on to make 129 before being bowled by James Averis – who finished with four for 40. Law and Chilton also made fifties, but Averis' late spell and a slow 39-ball 11 from Marcus North ensured that the total ended on 267 for 7. Then, James Anderson had three men caught off his bowling, as Gloucestershire crashed to 47 for 4. However, Anderson finished his spell, and Ramnaresh Sarwan crafted a century – which was shortly followed by Mark Hardinges reaching his first one-day century of his career, and in the process lifting his List A career batting average from 14.23 to 17.50, still below par for a specialist batsman like Hardinges. However, the pair added 221 runs in 116 minutes for the fifth wicket, hitting six sixes along the way, as they guided Gloucestershire out of the relegation zone in the National League. (Cricinfo scorecard)

==== National League: Glamorgan v Gloucestershire (23 August) ====
Glamorgan (4pts) beat Gloucestershire (0pts) by four wickets

Gloucestershire Gladiators crashed back into the relegation zone with a defeat against Glamorgan Dragons at Sophia Gardens, succumbing to medium pace bowler David Harrison, who bowled four maiden overs to end with bowling figures of 9–4–16–2. Despite half-centuries from Kabir Ali and Alex Gidman, who looked to give the visitors a comfortable target after moving to 103 for 3, Dean Cosker ripped out three quick wickets, and Gidman was forced to consolidate. He did top score with 62, but Glamorgan were set a rather modest target of 195 to win. Jon Lewis made inroads with his medium pace early on, taking three wickets as Glamorgan stuttered to 40 for 4, but Michael Powell and Dan Cherry put Glamorgan back in it with a 79-run stand, and Gloucestershire's bowlers were made to rue their 15 wides, as they helped Glamorgan to reach their target with two overs remaining. (Cricinfo scorecard)

==== County Championship: Gloucestershire v Glamorgan (25–28 August) ====
Glamorgan (21pts) beat Gloucestershire (3pts) by 322 runs

Glamorgan recorded their first Championship win in thirteen attempts this season at Bristol against fellow relegation candidates Gloucestershire. David Cherry made his second century of the season with changing partners, as he carried his bat to 152 not out at stumps – the total on 350 for 8. Cherry was last out, for 166, as Glamorgan were bowled out for 382 – to pass 350 for only the third time so far this season. Then, David Harrison and Alex Wharf embarked on a 19th-century-like bowling effort – in that they did almost all of the bowling. The seam pairing bowled 33 of the 34 overs, sharing all ten wickets. Gloucestershire crashed to 66 for 8 before Steve Adshead and Jon Lewis added 67 for the ninth wicket, but Whatf had Adshead caught and bowled before bowling William Rudge with the next ball. Robert Croft did not opt to bat again, however, preferring to set a big target for Gloucestershire to chase.

However, Gloucestershire bowled with more effect the second time around, Malinga Bandara taking four for 85 in a marathon 37-over spin bowling effort. Rudge repaired his golden duck, taking a wicket with his first ball of the innings to remove Mark Wallace for another golden duck. However, Rudge was taken for 36 in a six-over spell, and never returned to bowl. Dean Cosker top scored for Glamorgan with 52 from number seven as they made their way to 290, setting Gloucestershire a target of 540 to win – which would have been a first class record chase. Ramnaresh Sarwan attempted it, hitting out well after Kadeer Ali had been dismissed, but he was eventually bowled by Huw Waters for 54. Gloucestershire succumbed to 184 for 5 at stumps, needing to survive another day for the draw. Wharf spoiled that, though, taking four wickets on the fourth morning as Gloucestershire crawled to 217 and a 322-run defeat. (Cricinfo scorecard)

=== September ===
September began with a draw with Middlesex, and then four successive losses: a National League loss to Worcestershire Royals and Championship and League losses to Nottinghamshire before a 12-day break. Then came a los to Warwickshire in the Championship, and though they beat Leicestershire Foxes in the final match, they could not escape relegation on net run rate.

==== County Championship: Gloucestershire v Middlesex (30 August – 2 September) ====
Gloucestershire (10pts) drew with Middlesex (9pts)

Gloucestershire recovered well from last week's defeat at the hands of Glamorgan, to give Middlesex a decent fight and take the most points from a drawn game at Bristol. The hosts batted first, and after losing Craig Spearman and Ramnaresh Sarwan early, Gloucestershire fought back with three partnerships worth more than 60. Alex Gidman, Steve Adshead and Malinga Bandara all recorded fifties; the Sri Lankan Bandara, batting at eight, took the liberty to hit two sixes in an 89-ball 70. For Middlesex, Alan Richardson and Jamie Dalrymple took four wickets each, but gave up more than four runs an over in the process as Glamorgan made 333 in 92.2 overs. Middlesex batted to stumps on day one without loss, but William Rudge removed the top three to set them back slightly. Wickets continued to fall, with Malinga Bandara taking four of them, and Middlesex crashed to 248 for 9 before a last wicket partnership between Melvyn Betts and Stuart Clark took them to 297 before Bandara dismissed Betts lbw to end with five for 71.

Betts and Clark then shared five of the ten Gloucestershire wickets to fall, interrupting Gloucestershire's innings rather regularly, but not preventing four partnerships of above 50. Kadeer Ali top-scored with 61, while Mark Hardinges was stranded on 58 to lift the hosts to a total 287, which set Middlesex 324 in five hours to win. Gloucestershire got a breakthrough in the very first over, as Ed Smith hit two fours off Jon Lewis before being caught behind after four deliveries. With Owais Shah dismissed by Bandara, Middlesex went into defensive mode, and eventually the match was declared a draw with Middlesex 121 short of the winning target. (Cricinfo scorecard)

==== National League: Worcestershire v Gloucestershire (4 September) ====
Worcestershire (4pts) beat Gloucestershire (0pts) by eight wickets

A menacing spell from Shoaib Akhtar, who got six wickets for 16 runs, including the first five as Gloucestershire crashed to 22 for 5, left Gloucestershire Gladiators without any hope in the bottom-fight at New Road, Worcester. Akhtar's bowling analysis was the best in the National League all season. After Akhtar was taken off, Malinga Bandara and Mark Alleyne set about trying to bat out fifty overs, but Alleyne was caught by Worcestershire Royals' Vikram Solanki and Kabir Ali cleaned up the tail with two wickets as Gloucestershire were all out for 105. Bandara then got the wickets of Stephen Moore and Vikram Solanki with successive deliveries, but Chris Gayle guided the hosts home with an unbeaten 53 off 70 balls, as Worcestershire won with more than 20 overs to spare. (Cricinfo scorecard)

==== County Championship: Nottinghamshire v Gloucestershire (5–6 September) ====
Nottinghamshire (20pts) beat Gloucestershire (1.5pts) by an innings and 64 runs

Ten wickets fell on the first day at Trent Bridge, and twenty on the second, as Nottinghamshire recorded a victory to extend their hold on Division One of the County Championship. Batting first, they lost openers Jason Gallian and Darren Bicknell early on to be 16 for 2, and after a 27-run third-wicket stand Steve Kirby trapped Younis Khan lbw for 12. However, Russell Warren and David Hussey rebuilt, and Hussey went on to smash a four-and-a-half-hour 157, his third Championship century of the season, as Nottinghamshire made a total of 336. The first day's play ended when the last Nottinghamshire wicket fell, after 82.4 overs, and Gloucestershire were then penalised 1.5 points for their slow over rate.

Gloucestershire's batting, however, gave below-average scores. Their first innings lasted for 35 overs, Mark Ealham taking five for 31 as the visitors were asked to follow on. Kadeer Ali carried his bat and made 55 not out in their all out total of 103. Batting again, they crashed to 98 for 8, Ealham again taking four wickets, before Jon Lewis cut loose. Gloucestershire required 135 runs to make Nottinghamshire bat again, and Lewis decided that the best way of making that was to smash the ball about. He hit eight fours and three sixes for a 27-ball 55, before the cameo was ended by Hussey holding a catch off his bat. The quickfire innings lifted Gloucestershire to 169 – still 64 short of making Nottinghamshire bat again. (Cricinfo scorecard)

==== National League: Nottinghamshire v Gloucestershire (9 September) ====
Nottinghamshire (4pts) beat Gloucestershire (0pts) by one wicket

The relegation battle in the National League tightened further, as the match at Trent Bridge became a low-scoring thriller, where Gloucestershire Gladiators failed to put away two good positions – first they collapsed from 75 for 2 to make 116, then they allowed Nottinghamshire to hit 19 for the last wicket. They were put in to bat by Nottinghamshire Outlaws and after losing Kadeer Ali and Ramnaresh Sarwan for ducks, Steve Adshead and Craig Spearman rebuilt with a 60-run third-wicket stand. Mark Ealham and Gareth Clough shared the last seven wickets, however, after Ryan Sidebottom had bowled Spearman for 18, and Gloucestershire were all out for 116. James Averis then took four wickets for the Gladiators, as Nottinghamshire lost their first five wickets for 32 runs, but Anurag Singh and Mark Ealham put them back on track by adding 30 for the sixth wicket. Jon Lewis broke through their defences, however, shattering Ealham's stumps as he was bowled, and when Anurag Singh departed for 41, Nottinghamshire's task looked steep. They needed 19 for the last wicket with Ryan Sidebottom and Greg Smith batting – but Smith hit two fours as he ended with 16 not out to take Nottinghamshire to the victory. (Cricinfo scorecard)

==== County Championship: Warwickshire v Gloucestershire (21–24 September) ====
Warwickshire (18pts) beat Gloucestershire (3pts) by 181 runs

Warwickshire came back from 18 for 3 and then 90 for 5 to win their last Championship game of the season. A two-hour partnership yielding 70 runs between Jamie Troughton and Trevor Frost took Warwickshire past 150, before Sri Lankan Malinga Bandara removed four of the last five wickets, and Warwickshire ended on 208 all out. However, early wickets taken by Neil Carter and Dougie Brown sent Gloucestershire to 29 for 3 at the close of play on day one. Warwickshire continued to chip away on the second day, as five bowlers shared the remaining seven wickets, and Gloucestershire were bowled out for 118. South African-born first class debutant Grant Hodnett was the only one to pass 20 for Gloucestershire, taking three hours before falling one short of a half-century on debut. Ian Westwood did manage a fifty, hitting 55 in a 94-run stand with Nick Knight, and Warwickshire closed on 197 for 3. Despite four wickets from Malinga Bandara, Warwickshire managed 320 for 9 before declaring.

Gloucestershire attempted to chase a total of 411 to win, but after an opening stand of 80 Naqqash Tahir removed both openers in quick succession, and Gloucestershire closed on 97 for 2. Off spinner Alex Loudon then celebrated his call-up to the England team to tour Pakistan the following winter by taking six for 66 as Gloucestershire were bowled out for 229. (Cricinfo scorecard)

==== National League: Gloucestershire v Glamorgan (25 September) ====
Gloucestershire (4pts) beat Glamorgan (0pts) by three wickets

Gloucestershire Gladiators made it past Glamorgan Dragons to take a victory in their final game of the season, but they were still relegated into Division Two, thus suffering relegation in both forms of cricket. Winning the toss and bowling first, Gloucestershire's spinners Malinga Bandara and Mark Hardinges shared four for 87 in their 18 overs after the opening bowlers Jon Lewis and James Averis went wicketless. Gloucestershire did concede 32 extras, however, as Glamorgan assembled 262 for 8. Steve Adshead and Kadeer Ali added 86 for Gloucestershire's first wicket, before Craig Spearman took on the Gloucestershire bowlers to hit 80 off 71 balls. Despite his dismissal to send the score to 228 for 6, Bandara, Lewis and Mark Alleyne added the required runs, as Gloucestershire won with 14 balls to spare. (Cricinfo scorecard)

Preceded by 2004	Gloucestershire County Cricket Club	Succeeded by 2006
