= Gloucestershire County Cricket Club in 2006 =

Gloucestershire Gladiators
2006 season
- Coach: Mark Alleyne
- Captain: Jon Lewis
- Ground(s): Bristol; Cheltenham; Gloucester

During the 2006 season Gloucestershire County Cricket Club played in the Liverpool Victoria County Championship Division 2, the C&G Trophy South Conference, the Natwest Pro40 Division 2 and the Twenty20 Cup Mid/West/Wales Division.

== Players ==
- Hamish Marshall
- Ian Harvey
- Steve Adshead
- Kadeer Ali
- James Averis
- Martyn Ball
- Ian Fisher
- Alex Gidman
- Carl Greenidge
- Mark Hardinges
- Steve Kirby
- Chris Taylor
- James Pearson
- William Rudge
- Stephen Snell
- / Craig Spearman
- Phil Weston
- Matt Windows
- Matt Windows

== Liverpool Victoria County Championship Division 2 ==
=== Table ===
2006 County Championship - Division Two
Pos	Team	Pld	W	D	L	Pen	BP	Pts
1	Surrey	19	10	4	2	0	106	262
2	Worcestershire	16	8	4	4	0	101	229
3	Essex	16	7	5	4	0	102	220
4	Leicestershire	16	5	7	4	0.5	88	185
5	Derbyshire	16	4	8	4	1.5	92	178
6	Northamptonshire	16	3	8	5	0	89	163
7	Gloucestershire	16	3	7	6	1.5	87	155.5
8	Glamorgan	16	2	7	7	1.5	92	146.5
9	Somerset	16	3	4	9	1	83	140

=== Batting Averages ===
Player	Matches	Inns	N/O	Runs	High Score	Average	100	50	Catches	Stump
H J H Marshall	11	21	1	1218	168	60.9	5	7	6	0
I J Harvey	9	15	5	561	114	56.1	2	2	4	0
A P R Gidman	16	31	6	1244	120	49.76	4	7	2	0
C M Spearman	16	31	0	1370	192	44.19	6	2	18	0
Kadeer Ali	11	22	1	834	145	39.71	1	5	6	0
W P C Weston	13	24	1	911	130	39.6	2	6	7	0
M A Hardinges	11	15	2	444	107	34.15	2	1	0	0
S J Adshead	16	28	5	687	79	29.86	0	4	47	2
C G Taylor	14	27	0	705	121	26.11	1	4	12	0
J Lewis	11	14	2	242	57	20.16	0	1	4	0
M G N Windows	5	9	1	127	48	15.87	0	0	2	0
M C J Ball	10	15	1	215	58	15.35	0	1	16	0
S P Kirby	15	22	11	106	19	9.63	0	0	3	0

=== Results ===
Tuesday 18 April 2006 - Gloucestershire v Somerset - Bristol

Result: Gloucestershire won by an innings and 7 runs
Points: Gloucestershire 22, Somerset 3

Toss: Somerset
Umpires: N L Bainton, N G Cowley

Scorecard

Wednesday 3 May 2006 - Surrey v Gloucestershire -The Brit Oval

Result: Surrey won by an innings and 297 runs
Points: Surrey 22, Gloucestershire 2

Toss: Gloucestershire
Umpires: G I Burgess, N J Llong

Scorecard

Wednesday 10 May 2006 - Gloucestershire v Northamptonshire - Bristol

Result: Gloucestershire won by 6 wickets
Points: Gloucestershire 18, Northamptonshire 4

Toss: Northamptonshire
Umpires: R K Illingworth, P Willey

Scorecard

Tuesday 23 May 2006 - Essex v Gloucestershire - Chelmsford

Result: Match drawn
Points: Essex 11, Gloucestershire 11

Toss: Gloucestershire
Umpires: M R Benson, J W Lloyds

Scorecard

Friday 2 June 2006 - Gloucestershire v Worcestershire - Bristol

Result: Match drawn
Points: Gloucestershire 11, Worcestershire 12

Toss: Worcestershire
Umpires: D J Constant, B Leadbeater

Scorecard

Wednesday 14 June 2006 - Gloucestershire v Derbyshire - Bristol

Result: Match drawn
Points: Gloucestershire 11, Derbyshire 11

Toss: Derbyshire
Umpires: N A Mallender, R Palmer

Scorecard

Tuesday 20 June 2006 - Leicestershire v Gloucestershire - Grace Road

Result: Gloucestershire won by 7 wickets
Points: Gloucestershire 19, Leicestershire 7

Toss: Gloucestershire
Umpires: R K Illingworth, T E Jesty

Scorecard

Thursday 13 July 2006 - Gloucestershire v Essex - Bristol

Result: Essex won by 7 wickets
Points: Essex 22, Gloucestershire 6

Toss: Gloucestershire
Umpires: I J Gould, T E Jesty

Scorecard

Thursday 20 July 2006 - Worcestershire v Gloucestershire - New Road

Result: Worcestershire won by 58 runs
Points: Worcestershire 19, Gloucestershire 5

Toss: Worcestershire
Umpires: M J Harris, P Willey

Scorecard

Wednesday 26 July 2006 - Gloucestershire v Glamorgan - Cheltenham College

Result: Glamorgan won by 10 wickets
Points: Glamorgan 22, Gloucestershire 6

Toss: Glamorgan
Umpires: V A Holder, G Sharp

Scorecard

Wednesday 2 August 2006 - Gloucestershire v Leicestershire - Cheltenham College

Result: Leicestershire won by 4 wickets
Points: Leicestershire 22, Gloucestershire 4

Toss: Gloucestershire
Umpires: R A Kettleborough, N A Mallender

Scorecard

Tuesday 8 August 2006 - Northamptonshire v Gloucestershire - Northampton

Result: Match drawn
Points: Northamptonshire 12, Gloucestershire 10

Toss: Northamptonshire
Umpires: J H Evans, A A Jones

Scorecard

Thursday 17 August 2006 - Derbyshire v Gloucestershire - Derby

Result: Match drawn
Points: Derbyshire 12, Gloucestershire 7

Toss: Gloucestershire
Umpires: N G Cowley, J W Holder

Scorecard

Tuesday 22 August 2006 - Somerset v Gloucestershire - Taunton

Result: Somerset won by an innings and 76 runs
Points: Somerset 22, Gloucestershire 3

Toss: Somerset
Umpires: M J Harris, B Leadbeater

Scorecard

Wednesday 6 September 2006 - Gloucestershire v Surrey - Bristol

Result: Match drawn
Points: Gloucestershire 12, Surrey 9

Toss: Surrey
Umpires: N L Bainton, D J Constant

Scorecard

Wednesday 20 September 2006 - Glamorgan v Gloucestershire - Sophia Gardens

Result: Match drawn
Points: Glamorgan 11, Gloucestershire 10

Toss: Gloucestershire
Umpires: P J Hartley, A A Jones

Scorecard

Preceded by 2005	Gloucestershire County Cricket Club	Succeeded by 2007
