= Gloucestershire County Cricket Club in 2004 =

Gloucestershire Gladiators
2004 season
- Captain: Chris Taylor
- Ground(s): Bristol; Cheltenham; Gloucester

Gloucestershire County Cricket Club in 2004 were playing their cricket in Division One of the County Championship and totesport league. Despite finishing in mid-table positions in the leagues Gloucestershire won the Cheltenham and Gloucester Trophy, beating Worcestershire by eight wickets in the final at Lord's.

In the Final Phil Weston scored 110 and James Averis took four wickets for 23 runs for Gloucestershire. However, Vikram Solanki of Worcestershire was made Man of the Match for his 115 which included 14 fours and the century coming off 128 balls.

In the Twenty20 Cup, Gloucestershire came fifth in the Midlands/Wales/West group which was not high enough to proceed from the league stage to the quarter-finals. Gloucestershire won one match in the group stage, lost three and had one no-result.

== Players ==
- Shabbir Ahmed
- Shoaib Malik
- Steve Adshead
- Mark Alleyne
- James Averis
- Martyn Ball
- Alastair Bressington
- Ian Fisher
- Alex Gidman
- Tim Hancock
- Mark Hardinges
- Jon Lewis
- James Pearson
- Jack Russell
- Roger Sillence
- Mike Smith
- Craig Spearman
- Phil Weston
- Matt Windows

== Tables ==
=== Championship ===
2004 County Championship – Division One
Pos	Team	Pld	W	L	D	Pen	BP	Pts
1	Warwickshire	16	5	0	11	0	108	222
2	Kent	16	7	3	6	0	84	206
3	Surrey	16	5	5	6	0.5	102	195.5
4	Middlesex	16	4	4	8	0	101	179
5	Sussex	16	4	5	7	0	88	172
6	Gloucestershire	16	3	3	10	0	90	172
7	Worcestershire	16	3	6	7	0	91	161
8	Lancashire	16	2	4	10	2	88	154
9	Northamptonshire	16	1	4	11	0	76	134

=== totesport League ===
2004 totesport League – Division One
Pos	Team	Pld	W	L	NR	Pts
1	Glamorgan Dragons	16	11	5	0	44
2	Lancashire Lightning	16	9	6	1	38
3	Hampshire Hawks	16	7	6	3	34
4	Northamptonshire Steelbacks	16	8	8	0	32
5	Gloucestershire Gladiators	16	7	7	1	32
6	Essex Eagles	16	6	6	3	26
7	Warwickshire Bears	16	7	8	1	30
8	Kent Spitfires	16	5	9	2	22
9	Surrey Lions	16	4	9	3	22

== Match details ==
=== Gloucestershire v Kent (16–19 April) ===
County Championship Division One (4-day match)

Kent (16pts) beat Gloucestershire (3pts) by 7 wickets

=== Gloucestershire v Loughborough UCCE (21–23 April) ===
University Centres of Cricketing Excellence (3-day match)

Match Drawn

=== Kent v Gloucestershire (25 April) ===
National League Division One (45-over match)

Kent (4pts) beat Gloucestershire (0pts) by 1 run

=== Gloucestershire v Glamorgan (2 May) ===
National League Division One (45-over match)

Glamorgan (4pts) beat Gloucestershire (0pts) by 8 wickets

=== Netherlands v Gloucestershire (5 May) ===
Cheltenham & Gloucester Trophy 2nd round (50-over match)

Gloucestershire won by 72 runs and qualified for the Third Round of the C&G Trophy

=== Kent v Gloucestershire (7–10 May) ===
County Championship Division One (4-day match)

Kent (5pts) drew with Gloucestershire (7pts)

=== Gloucestershire v Northamptonshire (12–15 may) ===
County Championship Division One (4-day match)

Gloucestershire (12pts) drew with Northamptonshire (6pts)

=== Gloucestershire v Surrey (16 May) ===
National League Division One (45-over match)

Gloucestershire (4pts) beat Surrey (0pts) by 42 runs

=== Worcestershire v Gloucestershire (18–21 May) ===
County Championship Division One (4-day match)

Worcestershire (22pts) beat Gloucestershire (2pts)by an innings and 86 runs

=== Gloucestershire v Hampshire (23 May) ===
National League Division One (45-over match)

Hampshire (4pts) beat Gloucestershire (0pts) by 4 wickets

=== Gloucestershire v Hampshire (29 May) ===
Cheltenham & Gloucester Trophy 3rd round (50-over match)

Gloucestershire beat Hampshire by 3 wickets to qualify for the Fourth round of the C&G Trophy

Preceded by 2003	Gloucestershire County Cricket Club	Succeeded by 2005
