= Hampshire (surname) =

Hampshire is a surname of English origins. Mostly commonly, instances of the surname originated as locational surnames for Hampshire, England, and were passed down by descent or through marriage. In some cases, the name is known to have emerged as a locational surname for Hallamshire.

Notable people with the surname include:

- Alan Hampshire (born 1950), English cricketer
- David Hampshire (1917–1990), British racing driver
- Emily Hampshire (born c. 1980), Canadian and American actress
- Ian Hampshire (1948–2018), Australian rules footballer
- John Hampshire (1941–2017), English cricketer
- John Hampshire Sr. (1913–1997), English cricketer
- Joyce Ballou Gregorian Hampshire (1946–1991), American author
- Keith Hampshire (born 1945), English-born singer and actor
- Keith MacDermott Hampshire (1914–1982), Australian military pilot
- Margaret Hampshire (1918–2004), British educator and civil servant
- Michael Paul Hampshire (born 1989), British soccer player
- Paul Hampshire (1981–2022), Scottish soccer player
- Renee Hampshire (born 1981), Filipino comedian
- RJ Hampshire (born 1996), American professional Motocross and Supercross racer
- Robert Hampshire (born 1978), American transportation official
- Ryan Hampshire (born 1994), English rugby player
- Steven Hampshire (born 1979), Scottish soccer player
- Stuart Hampshire (1914–2004), English university administrator
- Susan Hampshire (born 1937), English actress
- William Hampshire (c. 1525–?), English member of parliament

== See also ==
- Ælfric of Hampshire
- Hamshaw
- Hallam (surname)
- Hanshaw
