= Bangladesh A cricket team in England in 2005 =

Bangladesh A toured England in July and August 2005 for first class and List A cricket matches against English domestic teams. The team struggled in the first class matches, where they drew two and lost three matches, and only looked like having a chance of winning in the last match against Kent. The one-day series went slightly better, with Bangladesh A winning two, losing one and abandoning a fourth, but for a second string national team against mainly second elevens from English domestic cricket, it was a highly disappointing tour.

== Match details ==
=== British Universities v Bangladesh A 18 July 2005|British Universities v Bangladesh A (18 July) ===
British Universities beat Bangladesh A by two wickets

In a twelve-a-side match at The Parks, Oxford, a strong Bangladesh A side including nine internationals went down to a combined universities side, admittedly including two current county professionals. Bangladesh A batted first, and made 249 for 6 in their 50 overs, Nafees Iqbal top-scoring with 109, while young prodigy Mushfiqur Rahim also made 50. Bangladesh A proceeded to gift away 35 extras - including 21 in wides - which probably cost them the match, as the Universities passed their score with ten balls remaining. Talha Jubair and Abdur Razzak showed promising things with the ball, though, taking four for 50 and two for 37 respectively. (Cricinfo scorecard)

=== Gloucestershire v Bangladesh A (20-22 July) ===
Gloucestershire won by 130 runs

Bangladesh A, still without a win on tour of England, shocked Gloucestershire initially at Bristol. Shahadat Hossain took three wickets for the tourists, and Syed Rasel and Talha Jubair also chipped in, as Gloucestershire imploded to 72 for 7. However, 83 from wicketkeeper Stephen Snell lifted them to 232, before Jon Lewis and James Averis dug into the tourists to reduce them to 29 for 3. However, Tushar Imran played his way to his fourth first-class century, a career-best 119, to give the tourists a slender lead of 19 after a 122-run fourth-wicket stand between Tushar and Alok Kapali. However, Gloucestershire were determined to prove their class the second time around, and after losing Kadeer Ali for 1 after half an hour they were in control, batting their way to 330 for 5 in just 65.1 overs before declaring as Alex Gidman recorded a 94-ball century. Sri Lankan overseas player Malinga Bandara then took five for 45 with his leg-spin as the tourists imploded from 106 for 2 to 181 all out. (Cricinfo scorecard)

=== Hampshire v Bangladesh A (24 July) ===
Match abandoned without a ball bowled

Rain at Rose Bowl, Southampton prevented Bangladesh A from playing their third scheduled match on their tour of England, against Hampshire. (Cricinfo scorecard)

=== Glamorgan v Bangladesh A (26-28 July) ===
Match drawn

After a first day where Glamorgan had racked up 380 runs, Michael Powell top-scoring with 111 and Alex Wharf making 77 while Syed Rasel took four for 89, the touring Bangladesh A side were sent in to bat. Only 10.1 overs of play was possible on the second day, though, and Andrew Davies took two wickets while Alex Wharf was taken for 36 runs off just five overs. Day three was rained out, so the match at Abergavenny ended in a tame draw, with Bangladesh A finishing on 54 for 2. (Cricinfo scorecard)

=== Lancashire v Bangladesh A (1 August) ===
Bangladesh A won by seven wickets (D/L Method)

Lancashire put out a second-string side against Bangladesh A, admittedly including former ODI bowler Sajid Mahmood, and were duly punished by the tourists, who cruised to a seven-wicket victory. Having won the toss, the Bangladeshis chose to bowl at Lancashire, and after Andrew Crook and Iain Sutcliffe had put on 35 for the first wicket, Shahadat Hossain dug out two quick wickets. Lancashire recovered somewhat before rain stopped play for nearly two hours, but when the players returned, Abdur Razzak ran through the middle order. He took three wickets for 25, and Lancashire collapsed to 149, with two run outs. Bangladesh were set 152 to win due to the rain interruption, and the tourists scored slowly before Tushar Imran came to the crease. Tushar took 91 balls to forge 93 runs, his sixth one-day fifty, as he guided Bangladesh A to a total of 155 for 3 with more than 15 overs remaining in the match. (Cricinfo scorecard)

=== Yorkshire v Bangladesh A (3-5 August) ===
Yorkshire won by 126 runs

A second-string Yorkshire pummeled the Bangladeshi bowlers, and despite the short timeframe - three days instead of the County Championship's four - they still got a win. With a run-rate of more than four an over they quickly made their way to 357 for 2 on the first day - Matthew Wood made an unbeaten 202, five short of his career highest score, and shared an opening partnership worth 272 with Joe Sayers. In reply, Tushar Imran made his second first-class century on tour, and the fifth of his career, with 116 in a little over three hours, and 19-year-old Nazimuddin made 60 as the tourists made their way to 325 - left-armer David Lucas taking five for 49. Yorkshire lost two wickets before stumps to be 48 for 2, but Michael Lumb made a century on the final day to ensure continued Yorkshire domination as they declared on 240 for 2, setting Bangladesh a target of 273 in three and a half hours. Lucas continued on his fine form from the first innings, taking three wickets, and no Bangladeshi passed 30 as they succumbed for 146 - Lucas took three for 35, fellow left-armer David Wainwright took three for 22 with his spin, and even part-time medium-pacer Rich Pyrah got one wicket in his two overs. (Cricinfo scorecard)

=== Durham v Bangladesh A (7 August) ===
Bangladesh A won by 68 runs

147 from Shahriar Nafees and Nazimuddin's seven-ball 28 - which included three sixes, two fours and a two before he was caught and bowled off Ben Harmison - lifted Bangladesh A to a massive 299 for 6 in 50 overs, despite Neil Killeen removing Tushar Imran and Alok Kapali with successive balls mid-innings. Nafees had paired up with Mehrab Hossain for 209 for the first wicket. Durham started with a 40-run opening partnership, but Syed Rasel and Shahadat Hossain both took two wickets with successive balls, separated by a few overs. Shahadat went on to take four for 34, while Australian Callum Thorp top-scored with 52 - in vain, as Durham imploded to 213. Durham's captain and opener Lowe ground out 36 runs from 80 deliveries to halt Durham's chase severely. (Cricinfo scorecard)

=== Surrey v Bangladesh A (10-12 August) ===
Match drawn

A Surrey team including two former internationals - England batsman Mark Butcher returning from injury, and the retiring Pakistani spin bowler Saqlain Mushtaq - amassed 336 for 5 before declaring after 74 overs at The Oval. The internationals made little impact in the first innings, however, as Butcher was caught for 5 and Saqlain did not bat. James Benning slashed 22 boundaries in his 124 before being run out, and wicketkeeper Andrew Hodd made an unbeaten 50 in his first first-class game. Bangladesh A battled well in reply, equalling Surrey's score before they were bowled out, while Saqlain got three for 82. Tushar Imran continued on his rich vein of form, making 70 and top-scoring. Scott Newman and Richard Clinton led Surrey to 73 without loss, but two quick wickets from Talha Jubair turned the game slightly. Mark Butcher repaired his first innings failure, however, as he made 90 to lead Surrey to 332 for 6 before they declared again. Jubair got four for 99 from an expensive 19 overs. However, the task of surviving 24 overs was easy enough for the tourists, who only lost one wicket, that of Shahriar Nafees who made a quickfire 63. (Cricinfo scorecard)

=== Kent v Bangladesh A (16-17 August) ===
Kent won by three wickets

Eighteen wickets fell on the frantic first day at St Lawrence Ground, and nineteen on the second, as two teams clashed in an interesting, low scoring match that lasted for only 173.4 overs. The Bangladesh A tourists had won the coin toss and chosen to bat, but immediately lost Nafees Iqbal for a duck. However, Tushar Imran made 86, and with some help from Shahriar Nafees (with 30) and Nazimuddin (27), he took the score to 185. That total did not look challenging, but that was before Syed Rasel's medium pace came to the scene. After Niall O'Brien and Neil Dexter put on 13 for the first wicket for Kent, Rasel and Shahadat Hossain dug out two wickets each, as Kent lost four wickets for two runs. Rasel took three more wickets before stumps on day one, and two more on the second morning, to end with seven for 50 - the only five-wicket-haul of Bangladesh A on the tour. However, only Shahriar Nafees passed 20 in the second innings, Tushar lost his golden touch (before this innings, he had made 455 runs at a batting average of 65) to only scamper 12 runs, while Antiguan-born Robbie Joseph took five for 19 with his pace bowling. Kent were set 188 to win, and lost wickets at regular intervals, but 54 from the first-class debutant Dexter turned out to be crucial as Kent made it with three wickets to spare. (Cricinfo scorecard)
