= 2001 Benson & Hedges Cup =

- Administrator: England and Wales Cricket Board
- Cricket format: List A (50 overs per innings)
- Champions: Surrey (3rd title)
- Participants: 18
- Matches: 52
- Most runs: 385 Marcus Trescothick (Somerset)
- Most wickets: 20 Ian Harvey (Gloucestershire)

The 2001 Benson & Hedges Cup was the thirtieth edition of cricket's Benson & Hedges Cup. The competition was won by Surrey County Cricket Club, who defeated Gloucestershire County Cricket Club in the final at Lord's on 14 July.

== Midlands/West/Wales Group ==
Team	Pld	W	L	NR	A	Pts	NRR
Somerset	5	4	1	0	0	8	0.764
Gloucestershire	5	4	1	0	0	8	-0.270
Warwickshire	5	3	2	0	0	6	0.307
Worcestershire	5	2	3	0	0	4	0.174
Northamptonshire	5	2	3	0	0	4	-0.537
Glamorgan	5	0	5	0	0	0	-0.442

== North Group ==
Team	Pld	W	L	NR	A	Pts	NRR
Nottinghamshire	5	4	1	0	0	8	0.771
Durham	5	3	2	0	0	6	0.333
Yorkshire	5	3	2	0	0	6	0.043
Leicestershire	5	3	2	0	0	6	-0.323
Lancashire	5	1	4	0	0	2	-0.274
Derbyshire	5	1	4	0	0	2	-0.609

== South Group ==
Team	Pld	W	L	NR	A	Pts	NRR
Sussex	5	3	0	0	2	8	0.887
Surrey	5	2	1	1	1	6	0.246
Middlesex	5	2	2	1	0	5	-0.591
Kent	5	2	2	1	0	5	-0.030
Essex	5	1	2	0	2	4	0.341
Hampshire	5	0	3	1	1	2	-0.720

=== Quarter-finals ===
22 May 2001
(scorecard)

Gloucestershire; 199 all out (49.5 overs)	v	Durham; 133 all out (42.3 overs)
Ian Harvey 43 (37); Neil Killeen 3/32 (10 overs)		Paul Collingwood 39 (72); Jon Lewis 4/23 (10 overs)

Gloucestershire won by 8 wickets
County Ground, Bristol
Umpires: Vanburn Holder & David Shepherd
Player of the match: Jon Lewis (Gloucestershire)

23 May 2001
(scorecard)

Warwickshire; 212/7 (50 overs)	v	Nottinghamshire; 214/4 (46.1 overs)
Nick Knight 103 (161); Greg Smith 4/18 (10 overs)		Darren Bicknell 117* (140); Dougie Brown 2/54 (9.1 overs)

Nottinghamshire won by 6 wickets
Trent Bridge, Nottingham
Umpires: Barry Dudleston & John Steele
Player of the match: Darren Bicknell (Nottinghamshire)

23 May 2001
(scorecard)

Somerset; 210/7 (50 overs)	v	Yorkshire; 213/2 (36.4 overs)
Jamie Cox 62 (72); Ryan Sidebottom 2/34 (10 overs)		Michael Vaughan 125* (128); Jason Kerr 1/36 (6 overs)

Yorkshire won by 8 wickets
County Ground, Taunton
Umpires: Mark Benson & Allan Jones
Player of the match: Michael Vaughan (Yorkshire)

23 May 2001
(scorecard)

Surrey; 239/7 (50 overs)	v	Sussex; 186 all out (47.2 overs)
Ali Brown 108 (147); Mark Robinson 2/49 (10 overs)		Richard Montgomerie 83 (124); Ben Hollioake 3/13 (4.2 overs)

Surrey won by 53 runs
County Ground, Hove
Umpires: John Holder & Bob White
Player of the match: Ali Brown (Surrey)

=== Semi-finals ===
25 June 2001
(scorecard)

Surrey; 361/8 (50 overs)	v	Nottinghamshire; 187 all out (31.5 overs)
Mark Butcher 84 (86); Greg Blewett 3/41 (6 overs)		Kevin Pietersen 78* (67); Alex Tudor 3/52 (10 overs)

Surrey won by 174 runs
The Oval, London
Umpires: Jeremy Lloyds & Alan Whitehead
Player of the match: Mark Butcher (Surrey)

25 June 2001
(scorecard)

Gloucestershire; 239/7 (50 overs)	v	Yorkshire; 142 all out (37.5 overs)
Matthew Windows 54 (93); Craig White 4/47 (10 overs)		Richard Blakey 35* (40); Ian Harvey 2/10 (6 overs)

Gloucestershire won by 97 runs
Headingley, Leeds
Umpires: Allan Jones & Ray Julian
Player of the match: Matthew Windows (Gloucestershire)

=== Final ===
14 July 2001
(scorecard)

Surrey; 244 all out (49.5 overs)	v	Gloucestershire; 197 all out (45.5 overs)
Ben Hollioake 73 (76); Ian Harvey 3/43 (9.5 overs)		Jack Russell 62 (96); Alex Tudor 3/28 (9.5 overs)

Surrey won by 47 runs
Lord's, London
Umpires: John Hampshire & Ken Palmer
Player of the match: Ben Hollioake (Surrey)

== See also ==
Benson & Hedges Cup
