= Hampshire (disambiguation) =

Hampshire is a county in England. It may also refer to:

== States and provinces ==
- New Hampshire, United States

== Counties ==
- Hampshire County, Massachusetts, United States
- Hampshire County, West Virginia, United States
- Hampshire County, Quebec, a former division in Lower Canada

== Constituencies ==
- Hampshire (UK Parliament constituency), former constituency

== Cities, towns, and villages ==
- Hampshire, Prince Edward Island, Canada
- Hampshire, Illinois, United States
- Hampshire, Tasmania, a locality in Australia
- Hampshire, Tennessee, United States
- Hampshire, West Virginia, United States

== Colleges ==
- Hampshire College, Amherst, Massachusetts

== People ==
- Hampshire (surname)

== Animals ==
- Hampshire (pig)
- Hampshire (sheep)

== Ships ==
- HMS Hampshire (1903), a British Royal Navy ship
- Hampshire (HBC vessel), operated by the Hudson's Bay Company in 1697, see Hudson's Bay Company vessels
