= Hamshaw =

Hamshaw is an English surname. Notable people with the surname include:

- Harper Hamshaw (1863–1925), English rugby union footballer
- Matt Hamshaw (born 1982), English footballer

== See also ==
- Harshaw
