= Harper Hamshaw =

English rugby union footballer

- Full name: Harper Oliver Hamshaw
- Born: fourth ¼ 1863 Wakefield district, England
- Died: first ¼ 1925 (aged 61) Wakefield district, England

Rugby union career
Senior career
Years	Team	Apps	(Points)
–	Wakefield Trinity		
–	Yorkshire		

Harper Oliver Hamshaw (birth registered fourth ¼ 1863 – death registered first ¼ 1925) was an English rugby union footballer who played in the 1880s. He played at representative level for Yorkshire, and at club level for Wakefield Trinity (it was a rugby union club at the time). Prior to Tuesday 27 August 1895, Wakefield Trinity was a rugby union club. A rugby shirt worn by Harper Hamshaw is on display at Wakefield Museum, and was used as the inspiration for a heritage shirt produced in 2010.

== Background ==
Harper Hamshaw's birth was registered in Wakefield district, West Riding of Yorkshire, and his death aged 61 was registered in Wakefield district, West Riding of Yorkshire.

== Playing career ==
Harper Hamshaw played in Wakefield Trinity's 1-goal 2-tries (11-points) to nil victory over Halifax in the Yorkshire Challenge Cup at Cardigan Fields, Leeds in 1883.
