= Kabir Ali =

British cricketer (born 1980)

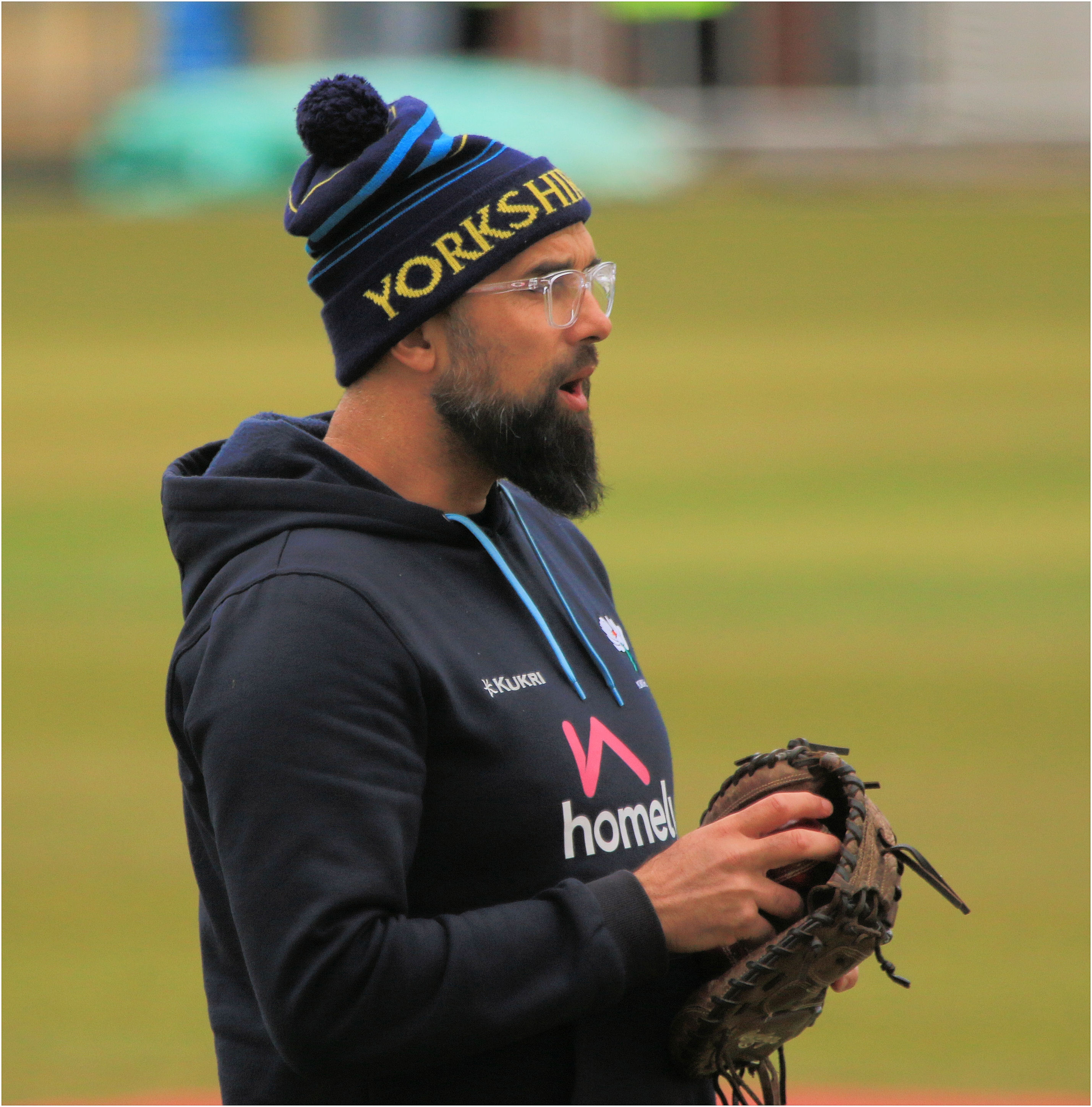
- Ali in 2024

Personal information
- Born: 24 November 1980 (age 45); Moseley, Birmingham, England
- Height: 6 ft 0 in (1.83 m)
- Batting: Right-handed
- Bowling: Right-arm fast-medium
- Role: Bowler
- Relatives: Kadeer Ali (Cousin); Moeen Ali (Cousin)

International information
- National side: England (2003–2006)
- Only Test (cap 615): 21 August 2003 v South Africa
- ODI debut (cap 179): 1 July 2003 v Zimbabwe
- Last ODI: 1 July 2006 v Sri Lanka

Domestic team information
- Years: Team
- 1999–2009: Worcestershire (squad no. 15)
- 2006/07: Rajasthan (squad no. 00)
- 2010–2012: Hampshire (squad no. 33)
- 2012–2013: Barisal Burners
- 2013–2014: Lancashire

Career statistics
Competition	Test	ODI	FC	LA
Matches	1	14	137	175
Runs scored	10	93	2,755	1,251
Batting average	5.00	15.50	17.00	15.63
100s/50s	0/0	0/0	0/7	0/4
Top score	9	39*	84*	92
Balls bowled	216	673	23,005	7,416
Wickets	5	20	500	261
Bowling average	27.20	34.10	27.46	24.91
5 wickets in innings	0	0	23	2
10 wickets in match	0	0	4	0
Best bowling	3/80	4/45	8/50	5/36
Catches/stumpings	0/–	1/–	33/–	31/–
- Source: ESPNcricinfo, 14 July 2016

Kabir Ali (born 24 November 1980) is an English former cricketer. A right-arm seam bowler and useful lower-order right-handed batsman, he played one Test match for England in 2003, while also earning 14 ODI caps between 2003 and 2006.

He started his playing career in 1999 at Worcestershire, spending 12 years in the first-team squad, before stints at Hampshire and Lancashire, where he retired in 2015. He is the first cousin of fellow cricketers Kadeer Ali and Moeen Ali, both of whom used to play alongside Kabir for Worcestershire.

== Early life and career ==
Kabir is part of a great cricketing family which includes the names of Kadeer Ali and Moeen Ali, both of whom used to play alongside Kabir for Worcestershire. After serving his apprenticeship in Worcestershire's Second XI and for the county's Board XI in the 38-County Cup for a couple of years, Kabir Ali made his first-class debut in a drawn game against Middlesex in September 1999. He bowled respectably enough, taking 2–36 and 1–22, but the match's lateness in the season robbed him of the chance to push for a regular place in the first team. Despite several appearances in the Benson & Hedges Cup in April 2000, including an impressive 4–29 on List A debut, Kabir spent most of the first part of that season still in the second team, although by the summer he had pushed his way into the full XI. Also in 2000, Kabir was awarded the NBC Denis Compton Award for the most promising young Worcestershire player.

== Domestic success and international selection ==
Over the following few years, Kabir gradually established himself as a hard-working bowler who was dedicated to his craft. His best period to date has been 2002–3; he took 138 first-class wickets in those two English seasons, including eight five-wicket innings hauls. International recognition first came during the 2002-3 winter, when he was invited to tour Australia with the ECB National Academy. It was thus unsurprising that he was selected to play for England in 2003, making his One Day International debut against Zimbabwe that July – although the game was a washout and Kabir had no chance to make an impression.

He was also selected for the Fourth Test against South Africa at Headingley in August 2003, taking a wicket in his first over (Neil McKenzie, caught behind by Alec Stewart off Kabir's fifth ball). He took five wickets in the match: 3–80 in the first innings and 2–56 in the second, including the key wicket of Gary Kirsten (for 130 and 60) in both innings. Nonetheless, England were soundly beaten and the selectors rang the changes, bringing in Steve Harmison and Ashley Giles for Kabir and James Kirtley. The Headingley match was Kabir's solitary Test appearance, although he made a number of further appearances at ODI level. His greatest success came against South Africa in 2004/05, when he took more wickets (13) than any other England bowler, and at Bloemfontein somehow conjured a tie from nowhere.

== Domestic career ==
Kabir first came to national prominence when he took a second-innings 5–48 (and eight wickets in the match) against the touring Zimbabwe side in May 2003; in a precursor to his final-over heroics at Bloemfontein, Kabir claimed the final two wickets with the scores level to tie the match. Kabir's life was touched by tragedy in July 2003, when his two-week-old nephew died. However, his father wished him to play for Worcestershire against Derbyshire a few days later, and he put in a magnificent display. After a quiet first innings with the ball, he scored a quickfire 68, putting on 104 with Steve Rhodes for the eighth wicket to help rescue his team from deep trouble at 190/7, and then ripped through the Derbyshire batting line-up to take 8–53, at the time the best innings analysis of his career. Thanks to Kabir's heroics, Worcestershire won the game by an innings. Kabir further demonstrated his batting credentials in September 2003, hitting 92 from 93 balls in a 45-over National Cricket League match against Essex, his maiden limited-overs fifty.

The 2004 season began frustratingly for Kabir, as injury prevented him from playing until the end of May. However, some good performances in midsummer brought him a place in the squad for the Champions Trophy tournament in September, and he retained his place for the winter tour of South Africa (see above). Kabir's performances in early 2005 were unspectacular, but nevertheless he was named in the 14-man squad for that summer's triangular one-day series with Australia and Bangladesh. He played in none of the games, however, and was replaced by Matt Prior for the three-game ODI series against Australia which immediately followed.

Kabir was not in England contention during the 2006 season, and for the winter of 2006–07 he turned out for Rajasthan in the Ranji Trophy along with teammate Vikram Solanki. Worcestershire's 2007 season began poorly, but Kabir claimed a career-best 8–50 in a rain-affected match against Lancashire in May. These were the best figures at Old Trafford for 13 years. On 15 August 2009 Hampshire confirmed they had signed Ali on a 3-year deal, subject to resolving Worcestershires demands for compensation of £60,000. Hampshire were not willing to meet Worcestershire's demands for compensation, making it seem as if Ali would have to honour the remaining year on his Worcestershire contract. In January 2010 Ali's dispute with Worcestershire was intensified, with Ali failing to report for pre-season training.

Ali was released from his contract at Worcestershire on 21 January 2010. It is widely expected that Ali will take up the three-year contract he had agreed with Hampshire in 2009. The following day Ali confirmed he had joined Hampshire, signing a three-year contract at the Rose Bowl.

Kabir Ali joined Barisal Burners of the Bangladesh Premier League, a Bangladeshi Twenty20 league, in February 2012.

On 2 November 2012, Kabir Ali joined Lancashire, who had recently been relegated to the second division of the County Championship, on a two-year contract. Kabir became an integral part of Lancashire's immediate return to the Championship top flight. He was often the death bowler in t20 games for the side, usually bowling the 18th and 20th overs, limiting batsmen and picking up useful wickets. In May 2015, he announced his retirement from cricket due to ongoing injuries.

== Coaching career ==
In January 2022, Kabir worked as a bowling consultant at Warwickshire while the Bears conducted a search for a replacement for departed bowling coach Graeme Welch. In February 2022, Kabir opted out of playing local club cricket to join Yorkshire as assistant coach working with head coach Ottis Gibson. After nearly three years in the role Kabir left the club at the end of 2024.

== See also ==
- One Test Wonder
- South Asian Cricket Academy
