= John Hampshire (cricketer, born 1913) =

English cricketer

John Hampshire (5 October 1913 – 23 May 1997) was an English first-class cricketer, who played for Yorkshire County Cricket Club in 1937. A right-arm fast bowler, he played three first-class matches, scoring 5 runs at an average of 2.50, and took five wickets at 21.80, plus one catch.

Born in Goldthorpe, Bolton-on-Dearne, Yorkshire, England, he created a cricketing family. His younger son, Alan Hampshire (born 1950), played one match for Yorkshire in 1975, and his elder son was the former Yorkshire and England batsman and umpire, most commonly referred to as Jack Hampshire (1941–2017).

Hampshire died in Rotherham, Yorkshire in May 1997, at the age of 83.
