= Harshaw =

Harshaw is a surname of Northern Irish origin. Notable people with the surname include:

- Henry B. Harshaw (1842–1900), American politician
- Margaret Harshaw (1909–1997), American opera singer and voice teacher

== See also ==
- Harshaw, Arizona, a ghost town
- Harshaw, Wisconsin, an unincorporated community
