= Hanshaw =

Hanshaw is a surname. Notable people with the surname include:

- Annette Hanshaw (1901–1985), American jazz singer
- Anthony Hanshaw (born 1978), American boxer
- Roger Hanshaw (born 1980), American politician

== See also ==
- Fanshawe (surname)
