= Alan Hampshire =

English cricketer (born 1950)

Alan Wesley Hampshire (born 18 October 1950, in Rotherham, Yorkshire, England) is an English first-class cricketer, who played for Yorkshire County Cricket Club in 1975.

A right-handed batsman, his only first-class match came against Derbyshire at Queen's Park, Chesterfield. He scored 17 and 1 in a drawn game. He played four one day matches, scoring 3 against Lancashire, ducks against Leicestershire and Northamptonshire and not batting against Worcestershire.

He also appeared for Yorkshire Second XI in 1974 and 1975, Yorkshire Under-25s in 1975, Northamptonshire Second XI in 1976 and the Marylebone Cricket Club (MCC) from 1981 to 1983.

He has now become a Hundall CC legend where he has played since 2004 with a batting average of 29.95. In 2017 Alan returned to Hundall CC 2nd XI and on his return scored his maiden century for the season whilst being supported by club legend Richard 'Marzy' Marshmallow in a 111 run partnership. Marshmallow Marzy scored a gallant 7 runs of the 111. But was immediately dropped by 2nd team vice C.Bacca for the following game.

He was born into a cricketing family. His father, John Hampshire, played three matches for Yorkshire in 1937, and his brother is the former Yorkshire and England batsman and umpire, Jack Hampshire. The former Gloucestershire cricketer Anthony Windows is his cousin, and his nephew, Paul Hampshire played a few games for the Nottinghamshire Second XI.
