= Matt Windows =

English cricketer

Matthew Guy Newman Windows (born 5 April 1973) is a former English cricketer. He attended Clifton College in Bristol, representing the First XI for many years as well as being a double foster cup champion at rackets. He is a right-handed batsman and a slow left-arm bowler. He played First Class cricket for Gloucestershire for his entire career (1992–2006). He scored 9,103 runs including 16 Centuries.

Windows played four Youth Test matches in 1992, making his debut against Pakistan and appearing three times in the Sri Lankan visit in August/September of the same year. He won the NBC Denis Compton award in 1998. Windows' father is former Gloucestershire cricketer Anthony Windows, and his cousins once-removed are John Hampshire and Alan Hampshire. He married Emma Virjee in 2002.
