= Alex Gidman =

English cricketer and coach (born 1981)

Personal information
- Full name: Alexander Peter Richard Gidman
- Born: 22 June 1981 (age 45); High Wycombe, Buckinghamshire, England
- Nickname: Giddo
- Height: 6 ft 2 in (1.88 m)
- Batting: Right-handed
- Bowling: Right-arm medium
- Relatives: Will Gidman (brother)

Domestic team information
- Years: Team
- 2001–2014: Gloucestershire (squad no. 5)
- 2001: Gloucestershire Cricket Board
- 2007/08: Otago
- 2015: Worcestershire (squad no. 3)
- FC debut: 3 July 2002 Gloucestershire v Derbyshire
- Last FC: 1 September 2015 Worcestershire v Sussex
- LA debut: 15 May 2001 Gloucestershire CB v Herefordshire
- Last LA: 18 August 2015 Worcestershire v Derbyshire

Career statistics
Competition	FC	LA	T20
Matches	204	195	96
Runs scored	11,622	4,473	1,448
Batting average	36.31	27.44	19.56
100s/50s	24/60	5/21	0/4
Top score	264	116	64
Balls bowled	7,340	3,256	292
Wickets	103	71	9
Bowling average	44.05	39.23	45.55
5 wickets in innings	0	1	0
10 wickets in match	0	0	0
Best bowling	4/47	5/42	2/24
Catches/stumpings	141/–	67/–	22/–
- Source: CricketArchive, 5 January 2016

Alexander Peter Richard Gidman (born 22 June 1981) is an English cricket coach and former cricketer. He was a right-handed batsman and a right-arm medium-pace bowler who played for Gloucestershire and Worcestershire.

== Playing career ==
Gidman went to Wycliffe College in Stonehouse, Gloucestershire, where he became a talented cricketer playing for the first XI. Gidman worked his way through the youth ranks as a Gloucestershire player, starting in the Under-17s County Championship tournaments of 1997 and 1998. Gidman's first-class cricketing career began with limited overs cricket in 2001 in the C&G Trophy. He played his first County Championship match a year later, and while Gloucestershire failed to impress in that year's competition, they were promoted the following year, with Gidman establishing himself in the middle-order and averaging over 40 with the bat.

Gidman was appointed England A captain for their 2003-04 tour to India, but had to leave the tour with a hand injury before he played a game. Gloucestershire finished in mid-table that year, with Gidman scoring 869 runs, for which he was rewarded with a new contract. While 2005 saw Gloucestershire relegated to the second division in the Championship, Gidman hit three centuries, including a career-topping high score of 142 against Surrey.

The following season, Gloucestershire struggled in the second division, though Gidman hit four centuries in the season, finishing with an average of just below 50. In 2007, he averaged 39.65 and was Gloucestershire's top scorer.

He has signed to play for Otago in the 2007-08 New Zealand cricket season.

Gidman was appointed captain of Gloucestershire in 2009 taking over from Jon Lewis. He was awarded a benefit year in 2012, after being with the county for 10 years. After Gloucestershire finished bottom of the 2012 County Championship, Gidman stood down as captain, having already relinquished captain duties in the Friends Life t20 to Hamish Marshall. He felt he needed to concentrate on his own game, and was replaced by Michael Klinger.

With the burden of the captaincy removed, Gidman enjoyed a very successful 2013 season, averaging 51.13 and amassing 1125 runs. He also scored a career high 211 against Kent, the first time a Gloucs player had scored a double century since Craig Spearman in 2006. In June 2013, he was rewarded with a new three-year contract taking him up to the end of the 2016 season.

In September 2014, it was announced that Gidman would join Worcestershire on a two-year contract.

In August 2015, Gidman announced that he was launching an organisation which would support ex-players back into a life after sport. In February 2016, Gidman announced his retirement from cricket, due to a serious finger injury.

=== Career best performances ===
	Batting				Bowling			
	Score	Fixture	Venue	Season	Figures	Fixture	Venue	Season
FC	264	Gloucestershire v Leicestershire	Bristol	2014	4/47	Gloucestershire v Glamorgan	Cardiff	2005
LA	116	Gloucestershire Gladiators v Sussex Sharks	Hove	2009	5/42	England A v Bangladesh A	Mirpur	2007
T20	64	Gloucestershire Gladiators v Worcestershire Royals	Bristol	2009	2/24	Otago Volts v Canterbury Wizards	Dunedin	2008

== Coaching career ==
On 5 March 2018, Gidman returned to Worcestershire as Second XI Coach. Later that year, on 30 November 2018, Gidman was promoted to Head Coach.

Gidman stepped down from his role and left Worcester on 14 October 2022. In February 2023, he joined Kent as batting coach for one season before moving to become an assistant coach with the England women's cricket team in October of the same year.
