= Roger Sillence =

English cricketer

Personal information
- Full name: Roger John Sillence
- Born: 29 June 1977 (age 49); Salisbury, Wiltshire, England
- Nickname: Sillo
- Height: 6 ft 3 in (1.91 m)
- Batting: Right-handed
- Bowling: Right-arm medium-fast
- Role: All-rounder

Domestic team information
- Years: Team
- 1996–2000: Wiltshire
- 2001–2005: Gloucestershire
- 2006–2007: Worcestershire
- 2008: Wiltshire
- 2009: Dorset
- FC debut: 12 September 2001 Gloucestershire v Sussex
- Last FC: 7 September 2007 Worcestershire v Hampshire
- LA debut: 4 May 1999 Wiltshire v Northamptonshire Cricket Board
- Last LA: 16 September 2007 Worcestershire v Warwickshire

Career statistics
Competition	FC	LA	T20
Matches	36	32	15
Runs scored	1,068	400	153
Batting average	22.72	22.22	15.30
100s/50s	1/5	0/2	0/0
Top score	101	94	22*
Balls bowled	4,609	895	271
Wickets	72	29	10
Bowling average	41.11	30.03	42.40
5 wickets in innings	3	0	0
10 wickets in match	0	0	0
Best bowling	7/96	4/35	2/27
Catches/stumpings	12/–	12/–	5/–
- Source: CricketArchive, 22 July 2009

Roger John Sillence (born 29 June 1977) is an English cricketer, best known for his time playing for Worcestershire and Gloucestershire. He is a right-handed batsman and a right-arm medium-fast bowler.

After several years of minor counties cricket for Wiltshire, Sillence made his List A debut in May 1999, when he appeared in the NatWest Trophy against the Northamptonshire Cricket Board. His contribution was decisive as he hit 82, the top score of the innings, to help his side record a two-wicket victory. However, his two further List A games for the county, in September 1999 and May 2000, were unsuccessful as he could manage only 0 and 7.

In 2000 Sillence played often for Wiltshire during those two seasons, and also had a few games with the Worcestershire Second XI with little success. In August he had an excellent run for Wiltshire, scoring 35, 106*, 32, 57, 74 and 150 in successive innings. That last knock was the final time he was to play for Wiltshire, as he was immediately called up by Gloucestershire's second team and remained with them for the rest of the season, continuing to play for the seconds throughout most of the following summer.

In 2001 he also made his first-class debut, playing a single game against Sussex and making an immediate impact by taking 5–97 in the first innings, his maiden victim at this level being the opposing captain, Chris Adams. However, he failed to impress with the bat: he made only 0 and 6, and in both innings his method of dismissal was identical: caught Montgomerie, bowled Kirtley.

2002 saw Sillence make his maiden first-class century as he hit 101 (from number nine in the order) against Derbyshire, though the second-highest of his seven innings was only 33, while with the ball he took 4–35 against West Indies A in a one-day match in late July, then in the last County Championship match of the season he took 5–63 against Durham.

He remained with Gloucestershire for three more seasons, making 92 (again from number nine) in the Championship against Warwickshire in August 2004, but first-team opportunities grew increasingly thin on the ground, until by 2005 he could manage only a single appearance. In October of that year Sillence signed a two-year contract with Worcestershire, and bided his time until then by spending the winter in Australia, playing for Casey-South Melbourne in Victorian Premier Cricket.

Back in England, the 2006 season began promisingly for Sillence as he was picked for a series of Worcestershire's pre-season minor matches against other counties. He was not particularly successful, however, and after a C&G Trophy to forget against Nottinghamshire (0 with the bat; 3–0–21–0 with the ball) he was sent to captain the second team against Leicestershire seconds. He immediately showed his ability by scoring 152 out of a Worcestershire total of 265, although he did not bowl a single ball.

Sillence returned to the first team immediately thereafter, managing to establish himself as a first-choice player, and in June recorded career-best figures of 7–96 in the first innings against Somerset. (He had been given an excellent platform by Worcestershire's own first innings of 618, which included a stand of 330 between Ben Smith and Graeme Hick, a county record against these opponents.) He kept his place for the mid-season Twenty20 Cup, and afterwards contributed a number of useful innings, most notably in a 50-over game against West Indies A, when his 97-ball 94 set up a narrow nine-run win.

Sillence played 10 first-class matches in 2007 but took only 15 wickets, at the end of the season he was released by Worcestershire.

Sillence has also played as Longton C.C.'s professional in the North Staffs and South Cheshire League Premier Division 'A', substituting for Bruce Martin, a New Zealander who proved unable to appear because of visa regulations.
