= Chris Taylor (cricketer, born 1976) =

English cricketer (born 1976)

Personal information
- Full name: Christopher Glyn Taylor
- Born: 27 September 1976 (age 50); Bristol, England
- Height: 5 ft 8 in (1.73 m)
- Batting: Right-handed
- Bowling: Right-arm off break

Domestic team information
- Years: Team
- 1999-2011: Gloucestershire

Career statistics
| Competition | FC | LA | T20 |
|---|---|---|---|
| Matches | 160 | 181 | 79 |
| Runs scored | 9,083 | 3,716 | 1,416 |
| Batting average | 34.93 | 26.73 | 23.21 |
| 100s/50s | 20/43 | 2/21 | 0/6 |
| Top score | 196 | 105 | 83 |
| Balls bowled | 2,527 | 700 | 36 |
| Wickets | 28 | 16 | 1 |
| Bowling average | 52.25 | 38.31 | 60.00 |
| 5 wickets in innings | 0 | 0 | 0 |
| 10 wickets in match | 0 | 0 | 0 |
| Best bowling | 4/52 | 2/5 | 1/22 |
| Catches/stumpings | 101/0 | 76/1 | 26/0 |
- Source: , 4 July 2015

Christopher Glyn Taylor (born 27 September 1976) is an English former professional cricketer who now coaches the game as a specialist fielding coach.

Chris Taylor played a right-handed batsman and a right-arm off-break bowler for Gloucestershire County Cricket Club. Since leaving Gloucestershire in 2011, Taylor has taken up an array of coaching roles, most notably joining England as fielding coach in 2014.

== Playing career ==
Taylor's first opportunity in first-class cricket came against Middlesex in 2000, where he hit a century on his debut for the side. Covering extensively as a wicket-keeper throughout his first year of cricket, he found himself in one of his first cricket matches up against a touring Zimbabwe team. Having aided Gloucestershire through five seasons of Division Two cricket, he was instrumental in their rise to Division One of the County Championship for 2004, the year he was made captain of the four-day side by player-coach Mark Alleyne.

Despite managing to keep a strong hold on his middle-order batting position during his first season in the top division, he was unable to stop his Gloucestershire side from dropping to Division Two once again in the year 2005. For 2006 he lost the position of captain to Jon Lewis. He scored over 1000 runs in 2007 and 2011.

Despite having a successful career at Gloucester, which included winning seven one day trophies with the club, his departure was controversial and he took the county to a tribunal for unfair dismissal after his contract was not renewed after 2011. A settlement was eventually reached and Taylor retired from playing to focus on coaching.

== Coaching career ==
Taylor's first move into coaching came in 2008 when he was appointed Gloucestershire fielding coach in 2008 while still playing for the club. He left in 2011 when his contract with the club expired. He spent the 2013 season with Somerset working as assistant coach, before moving to Surrey as fielding coach for the 2014 season.

Taylor worked with the England Lions as fielding coach on and off from 2008 to 2014. During this time he also had a brief spell with the Denmark national side, acting as a consultant coach. He was the fielding coach for the England cricket team between 2014 and 2017 before returning to Surrey.
