= Will Rudge =

English cricketer (born 1983)

William Rudge
Personal information
- Full name: William Douglas Rudge
- Born: 15 July 1983 (age 43)
- Batting: Right-handed
- Bowling: Right-arm medium

Domestic team information
- Years: Team
- 2002–2008: Gloucestershire
- FC debut: 20 July 2005 Durham v Bangladesh A
- Source: Cricinfo, 28 May 2024

William Douglas Rudge (born 15 July 1983) is an English cricketer. He was born in Bristol and educated at Clifton College. He is a right-handed batsman and a right-arm medium-pace bowler who has played List A and first-class cricket for Gloucestershire. He had previously played for the Gloucestershire Cricket Board during 2002/03. He is now playing Minor Counties cricket for Herefordshire, and made an impressive debut against Shropshire at Eastnor.
