= John Hampshire =

English cricketer

Personal information
- Full name: John Harry Hampshire
- Born: 10 February 1941; Thurnscoe, Yorkshire, England
- Died: 1 March 2017 (aged 76)
- Nickname: Jack
- Batting: Right-handed
- Bowling: Right-arm legbreak
- Role: Umpire

International information
- National side: England
- Test debut (cap 442): 26 June 1969 v West Indies
- Last Test: 14 August 1975 v Australia
- ODI debut (cap 6): 5 January 1971 v Australia
- Last ODI: 26 August 1972 v Australia

Domestic team information
- Years: Team
- 1961–1981: Yorkshire
- 1967/68–1968/69 1977/78–1978/79: Tasmania
- 1981: Leicestershire
- 1982–1984: Derbyshire

Umpiring information
- Tests umpired: 21 (1989–2002)
- ODIs umpired: 20 (1989–2001)
- FC umpired: 349 (1985–2005)
- LA umpired: 365 (1985–2014)
- T20 umpired: 8 (2004–2005)

Career statistics
| Competition | Test | ODI | FC | LA |
|---|---|---|---|---|
| Matches | 8 | 3 | 577 | 280 |
| Runs scored | 403 | 48 | 28,059 | 7,314 |
| Batting average | 26.86 | 24.00 | 34.55 | 31.12 |
| 100s/50s | 1/2 | 0/0 | 43/156 | 7/41 |
| Top score | 107 | 25 | 183* | 119 |
| Balls bowled | – | – | 2,539 | 54 |
| Wickets | – | – | 30 | 1 |
| Bowling average | – | – | 54.56 | 45.00 |
| 5 wickets in innings | – | – | 2 | 0 |
| 10 wickets in match | – | – | 0 | 0 |
| Best bowling | – | – | 7/52 | 1/22 |
| Catches/stumpings | 9/– | 0/– | 446/– | 84/– |
- Source: ESPNcricinfo, 3 March 2017

John Harry Hampshire (10 February 1941 – 1 March 2017), also known as Jack Hampshire, was an English cricketer and umpire, who played eight Tests and three One Day Internationals (ODIs) for England between 1969 and 1975. He played first-class cricket for Yorkshire from 1961 to 1981, and for Derbyshire from 1982 to 1984. Overseas, he was a successful captain of Tasmania in the period before the state was included in the Sheffield Shield. He was also appointed President of Yorkshire County Cricket Club in 2016, serving until his death a year later.

Cricket writer Colin Bateman remarked, "Hampshire thrilled English cricket supporters when he scored a century at Lord's on his Test debut – a unique achievement for an England player. An attractive middle-order stroke-player, Hampshire looked one for the future but he was dropped after one more match".

== Early life ==
Born on 10 February 1941 in Thurnscoe, Hampshire came from a cricketing family. His father, John, played for Yorkshire in 1937. His younger brother, Alan, also played for Yorkshire in 1975.

== Playing career ==
Hampshire made his debut for his native Yorkshire at the age of 20 in 1961, and had a twenty-year career with the club.

Between 1969 and 1975 he played 8 Tests for England, scoring 403 runs. On his debut against the West Indies at Lord's, he made a dashing 107 and he appeared set for a glittering Test career. He was the first Englishman to score a Test hundred on debut at Lord's. Strangely, he was dropped after the next match, and faded away from the Test arena, making just half-a-dozen more Test appearances for England.

After the ousting of Geoff Boycott from the Yorkshire captaincy, Hampshire captained the club for two seasons from 1979 to 1980. The two had previously clashed, and in the last season of Boycott's captaincy, Hampshire had staged a 'go-slow' at Northampton – which cost Yorkshire a bonus point – as a protest against slow batting by his long-time rival. He left Yorkshire in 1981 during one of the county's then almost perennial bouts of civil war, and during the winter played for a Leicestershire team as a guest in Zimbabwe. In 1982 he joined Derbyshire where he stayed for three years.

Hampshire played for Tasmania for five years under the captaincy of Jack Simmons. He made his Sheffield Shield debut with Tasmania in their first season in 1977–78. He was a member of Tasmania's 1978–79 Gillette Cup-winning squad.

Hampshire was a powerful stroke maker in the middle order, especially strong off the front foot. He scored 28,059 runs in 577 first-class matches at 34.55, including 43 centuries, with a highest score of 183 not out. He added another 7,314 runs in 280 one day matches with a best of 119 at 31.12. He was a brave close fielder who took 446 catches in his first-class career. He was seen as potentially useful leg spinner, taking 7 for 52 against Glamorgan in 1963.

== Umpiring career ==
After retiring from the playing arena, Hampshire became a county umpire in 1985. He was then appointed to the Test list in 1989, and later in 1999 he was added to the ICC panel of umpires. Hampshire stood in his first Test match as an umpire at Old Trafford during the 1989 Ashes. He remained a highly respected umpire on the first-class circuit until his retirement in 2005. He stood in 21 Tests and 20 One-day Internationals. He umpired the final of the last Benson and Hedges Cup competition in 2002 with Barry Dudleston, thirty years after having played against Dudleston in the first final of that competition held in 1972.

== Coaching career ==
Hampshire coached Zimbabwe in its first Test against India in 1992.

== Death ==
Hampshire died at the age of 76 on 1 March 2017, after a long illness.

== See also ==
- List of Test cricket umpires
- List of One Day International cricket umpires

Sporting positions
| Preceded by Geoff Boycott | Yorkshire cricket captains 1979–1980 | Succeeded by Chris Old |
