= Phil Weston =

English cricketer (born 1973)

William Philip Christopher Weston (born 16 June 1973 in Durham), known as Phil Weston, is an English former cricketer. He was a left-handed opening batsman whose brother, Robin was the youngest player for Durham in the club's history. His father, Mike, played for Durham between 1956 and 1973.

Weston played for Worcestershire, Gloucestershire and Derbyshire during a career which spanned 1991 - 2007. A highlight of his career was scoring a century for Gloucestershire against his former club, Worcestershire, in the 2004 final of the Cheltenham & Gloucester Trophy.

He announced his retirement in February 2008.
