= Stephen Adshead =

English cricketer (born 1980)

Steve Adshead
Personal information
- Full name: Stephen John Adshead
- Born: 29 January 1980 (age 46); Worcester, Worcestershire, England
- Height: 5 ft 10 in (1.78 m)
- Batting: Right-handed
- Role: Wicket-keeper

Domestic team information
- Years: Team
- 2010–2013: Herefordshire
- 2010: Derbyshire
- 2004–2009: Gloucestershire (squad no. 6)
- 2003: Shropshire
- 2003: Worcestershire
- 2001: Leicestershire Cricket Board
- 2000–2002: Leicestershire
- 1999: Herefordshire

Career statistics
Competition	FC	LA	T20
Matches	77	104	49
Runs scored	3304	1580	424
Batting average	31.46	22.89	16.30
100s/50s	3/17	0/8	0/1
Top score	156*	87	81
Catches/stumpings	205/15	109/31	18/17
- Source: Cricinfo, 28 April 2024

Stephen John Adshead (born 29 January 1980 in Worcester, Worcestershire) is an English first-class cricketer. He is a right-handed batsman and wicketkeeper who, in nearly 10 years as a first-class cricketer, played for Derbyshire, Gloucestershire, Herefordshire, Leicestershire and Worcestershire.

Adshead's first-class best of 156 not out came against Essex in 2009.

He was released by Gloucestershire at the end of the 2009 season, having played 70 of his 77 first-class games for the county. In all he scored 3304 runs, including 3 hundreds, at 32.05 and took 205 catches and completed 15 stumpings. He scored 1580 runs in 104 list A one-day matches, taking 109 catches and 31 stumpings. He also played 49 Twenty20 matches.

Adshead recorded a score of 240* coming from just 169 deliveries on Saturday 5 May 2012 playing for Astwood Bank 1st XI.
