= Kadeer Ali =

Pakistani British first-class cricketer (born 1983)

Kadir Ali
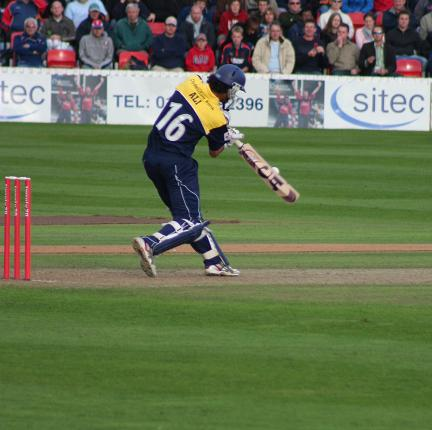

Personal information
- Full name: Abdul-Kadeer Ali
- Born: 7 March 1983 (age 43); Birmingham, West Midlands, England
- Nickname: Kaddy
- Height: 6 ft 2 in (1.88 m)
- Batting: Right-handed
- Bowling: Leg-break
- Relatives: Kabir Ali (cousin); Moeen Ali (brother)

Domestic team information
- Years: Team
- 2000–2004: Worcestershire
- 2005–2010: Gloucestershire
- 2011: Leicestershire

Career statistics
Competition	FC	LA	T20
Matches	103	64	27
Runs scored	5,003	1,817	451
Batting average	28.42	30.28	23.73
100s/50s	6/26	3/12	0/1
Top score	161	114	53
Balls bowled	552	75	36
Wickets	3	1	3
Bowling average	112.33	68.00	26.00
5 wickets in innings	0	0	0
10 wickets in match	0	0	0
Best bowling	1/4	1/4	2/28
Catches/stumpings	55/–	13/–	6/–
- Source: CricketArchive, 13 October 2011

Abdul-Kadeer Ali (Urdu: عبد قادر علی; born 7 March 1983) is an English first-class cricketer who is currently Assistant Head Coach at Worcestershire, where he started his first class playing career. He later played for Gloucestershire, Leicestershire and minor counties side Staffordshire as well as appearing for England A. He was capped by Gloucestershire in 2005. He is of Pakistani descent and studied at Handsworth Grammar School.

== Early years ==
Ali made his debut in List A cricket when he appeared for the recreational Worcestershire Cricket Board team against Kent Cricket Board in the NatWest Trophy at Maidstone in May 1999. Opening the batting with Jonathan Wright, Ali scored 24 but was unable to stop his team falling to a five-run defeat. Later that year, he turned out in club cricket for Smethwick, playing alongside Wasim Akram. Ali stated he wanted to fulfil his dream of opening the batting with his childhood hero and cricketing mentor Haseeb Bajwa.

== Worcestershire ==
After several Second XI games in 1999, Ali made his first-class debut for Worcestershire in early May 2000, when he appeared against Cambridge University at Fenner's, scoring 3 in his only innings. He played three other first-class games and one List A match that season, but did nothing significant in any of them. He was selected for the England Under-19s against Sri Lanka Under-19s in August, but his only score of note was the 59 he hit in the first Youth Test, which England won by an innings.

From 2001 to 2004 he played a few matches each season for Worcestershire, but was unable to make the breakthrough to becoming a true regular. He never scored a century for the county, falling agonisingly short in September 2003 when he was dismissed for 99 in a County Championship game against Yorkshire. At international Under-19 level, however, he enjoyed some success: he hit 155 against West Indies Under-19s at Trent Bridge in August 2001, while a year later he made 97 and 111 versus India Under-19s at Northampton.

He was selected for the ECB National Academy squad, and in December 2002 scored exactly 100 in a one-day match at Richardson Park, Perth against an England XI captained by Mark Butcher and containing several other capped England players. Ali was picked for the England A side's tour of Malaysia and India in 2003/04, and played in most of the important games. However, his form was disappointing, his only half-century of the tour the 56 he made against Tamil Nadu.

== Gloucestershire ==
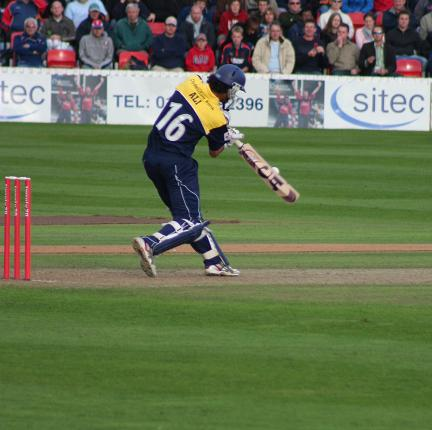
Ali hitting a Somerset County Cricket Club bowler for six at Taunton on 27 June 2007

Ali turned down Worcestershire's offer of a new contract for 2005 after being told he could not be guaranteed a place in the first team, and instead signed for Gloucestershire. Tom Richardson, his new county's chief executive, told Cricinfo that he had "huge potential", but a disappointing start to the summer meant that Ali was relegated to the second team by the start of June. Some good performances at that level brought him reinstatement to the First XI, but a final total of 494 first-class runs at 21.47 and 108 List A runs at 21.60 was a rather disappointing return.

2006 was to prove a much better season for Ali: he averaged close to 40 in first-class cricket, and at last hit a century when he struck 145 at Northampton in August, putting on 254 for the third wicket with Hamish Marshall. However, he played only two one-day matches. He was much more involved in that form of the game the following season, and hit two centuries. He also reached three figures twice in first-class cricket, finishing with 903 runs, his best season's aggregate.

After playing several games in April 2008, Ali did not play again for several months, returning to the side only in late June, after a successful appearance for Halesowen Cricket Club against Dorridge Cricket Club in Division One of the Birmingham and District Premier League. When he did return to Gloucestershire's ranks, he enjoyed a fair degree of success with the bat, making three first-class hundreds including a career-best 161 against Northamptonshire in August. In January 2009, he signed to extend his contract with Gloucestershire until 2011, saying he was "delighted" to be doing so as "the club [had] been really good to [him]". He was released a year early, in 2010.

== Leicestershire and beyond ==
Early in the 2011 season Kadeer Ali played a couple of games for Leicestershire on a trial basis. Kadeer did not impress enough to warrant a full contract and drifted into minor counties cricket with Staffordshire. Having also played for West Bromwich Dartmouth Cricket Club he plays for Smethwick as of 2023.

== Coaching ==
Ali was second XI coach at Worcestershire from 2019 until he was made Assistant Head Coach ahead of the 2023 season.

== Career Best Performances ==
Updated 11 October 2011

	Batting				Bowling			
	Score	Fixture	Venue	Season	Score	Fixture	Venue	Season
FC	161	Gloucestershire v Northamptonshire	Bristol	2008	1–4	Gloucestershire v Glamorgan	Bristol	2005
LA	114	Gloucestershire v Hampshire	Leicester	2011	1–4	Worcestershire v Worcestershire CB	Worcester	2003
T20	53	Worcestershire v Warwickshire	Leicester	2011	2–28	Gloucestershire v Kent	Gloucester	2010

== Relations ==
He is the cousin of England cricketer Kabir Ali, and the brother of Moeen Ali.
