= Ian Fisher (English cricketer) =

English cricketer

Personal information
- Full name: Ian Douglas Fisher
- Born: 31 March 1976 (age 50); Bradford, West Yorkshire, England
- Batting: Left-handed
- Bowling: Left-arm slow

Domestic team information
- Years: Team
- 1996–2001: Yorkshire
- 2002–2008: Gloucestershire
- 2009: Worcestershire
- First-class debut: April 1996 Yorkshire v Mashonaland Invitation XI

Ian Douglas Fisher (born 31 March 1976, Bradford, West Yorkshire, England) is an English first-class cricketer. He is a left-handed batsman and a left-arm slow bowler. He made his first-class debut in April 1996 during Yorkshire's preseason tour of Zimbabwe, and in his first innings took 5 for 35 against a Mashonaland Invitation XI. However, the surge in form of Richard Dawson stopped Fisher from progressing with Yorkshire, and he moved to Gloucestershire for the 2002 season. He had a decent summer, scoring over 500 runs and taking more than 30 wickets in first-class cricket; he also scored 103 not out against Essex, which remains his only first-class century.

Fisher helped Gloucestershire to promotion to Division One in the County Championship in 2003, but gradually fell away from first-team contention: by 2008 Twenty20 was the only form of the game where he was only playing more than a handful of matches. In 2009, he left Gloucestershire to join Worcestershire, but he was not retained at the end of the season.
