= Mark Hardinges =

English cricketer

Personal information
- Full name: Mark Andrew Hardinges
- Born: 5 February 1978 (age 48); Gloucester, England
- Batting: Right-handed
- Bowling: Right-arm medium
- Role: All-rounder

Domestic team information
- Years: Team
- 1999–2008: Gloucestershire
- 2009: Essex
- 2010: Unicorns
- FC debut: 17 August 1999 Gloucestershire v Northamptonshire
- Last FC: 22 July 2008 Gloucestershire v Essex
- LA debut: 19 July 1999 Gloucestershire v Sri Lanka A
- Last LA: 30 August 2008 Gloucestershire v Worcestershire

Career statistics
Competition	FC	LA	T20
Matches	50	85	45
Runs scored	1,778	1,318	543
Batting average	26.53	21.96	21.72
100s/50s	4/6	1/7	0/2
Top score	172	111*	94*
Balls bowled	6,396	2,996	671
Wickets	95	77	35
Bowling average	40.53	35.63	27.17
5 wickets in innings	1	0	0
10 wickets in match	0	0	0
Best bowling	5/51	4/19	4/30
Catches/stumpings	26/–	32/–	10/–
- Source: CricketArchive, 20 June 2010

Mark Andrew Hardinges (born 5 February 1978) is an English cricketer. He is a right-handed batsman and a right-arm medium-pace bowler.

Having made his debut in 1999, Hardinges made important contributions for Gloucestershire and went to Western Australia in an effort to improve his cricket. He played in the 2001 Benson & Hedges Cup final taking one wicket. He was a regular player for his home county until 2008 when he joined Essex for whom he played Twenty20 cricket in 2009.

In 2010, Hardinges was selected as one of 21 players to form the first Unicorns squad to take part in the Clydesdale Bank 40 domestic one day competition against the regular first-class counties. The Unicorns were made up of 15 former county cricket professionals and 6 young cricketers looking to make it in the professional game.

He is currently Director of Sport at Malvern College.
