= Martyn Ball =

English cricketer

Martyn Charles John Ball (born 26 April 1970, in Bristol) is an English former cricketer. He was a right-handed batsman and right-arm off-break bowler. He spent his 19-year career at Gloucestershire.

Ball made his first-class debut in 1988 and continued to bowl a trademark floating off-break for several years, and in 1996 was offered his first county cap. Ball was at the forefront of Gloucestershire's rise to the top of the English game, in a county which at the time was producing few top-quality players.

Ball replaced Robert Croft when the latter revealed he was uncomfortable about going on the 2001-02 tour to India, but the selectors handed starts to Richard Dawson and Ashley Giles over Ball on tour.

Ball was involved with the Professional Cricketers' Association, initially as a player's representative before rising to the rank of chairman at the end of his career.

He retired in January 2007 and now works for an American real estate company.
