= James Pearson (cricketer, born 1983) =

English cricketer

Personal information
- Full name: James Alexander Pearson
- Born: 11 September 1983 (age 43); Bristol, England
- Batting: Left-handed

Domestic team information
- Years: Team
- 2001: Gloucestershire Cricket Board
- 2002–2005: Gloucestershire
- 2006: Wiltshire

Career statistics
Competition	First-class	List A
Matches	8	3
Runs scored	320	7
Batting average	22.85	2.33
100s/50s	0/3	0/0
Top score	68	7
Balls bowled	–	18
Wickets	–	1
Bowling average	–	29.00
5 wickets in innings	–	0
10 wickets in match	–	0
Best bowling	–	1/29
Catches/stumpings	4/–	1/–
- Source: Cricinfo, 8 November 2010

James Alexander Pearson (born 11 September 1983) is an English cricketer. Pearson is a left-handed batsman. He was born in Bristol and for a brief period attended Clifton College.

Pearson represented the Gloucestershire Cricket Board in 2 List A matches. These came against Herefordshire in the 2nd round of the 2001 Cheltenham & Gloucester Trophy and the Yorkshire Cricket Board in the 2nd round of the 2002 Cheltenham & Gloucester Trophy which was played in 2001.

In 2002, Pearson made his first-class debut for Gloucestershire against Northamptonshire in the County Championship. From 2002 to 2005, he represented the county in 8 first-class matches, the last of which came against Bangladesh A. In his 8 first-class matches, he scored 320 runs at a batting average of 22.85, with 3 half centuries and a high score of 68. In the field he took 4 catches. In 2002, he played his only List A match for the county, which was also his last in that format, against West Indies A. In his career total of 3 List A matches, he scored 7 runs at an average of 2.33, with a high score of 7. In the field he took a single catch, while with the ball he took a single wicket at a cost of 29 runs.

In 2006, he played a single Minor Counties Championship match for Wiltshire against Herefordshire.

He has played club cricket for Bristol West Indians Cricket Club.
