= Mark Alleyne =

English former cricketer

Mark Alleyne MBE
Personal information
- Full name: Mark Wayne Alleyne
- Born: 23 May 1968 (age 58); Tottenham, London, England
- Height: 5 ft 10 in (178 cm)
- Batting: Right-handed
- Bowling: Right-arm medium

International information
- National side: England (1999–2000)
- ODI debut (cap 152): 10 January 1999 v Australia
- Last ODI: 5 October 2000 v Bangladesh

Domestic team information
- Years: Team
- 1986–2005: Gloucestershire

Career statistics
Competition	ODI	FC	LA	T20
Matches	10	328	436	18
Runs scored	151	14,943	8,308	159
Batting average	21.57	30.81	27.23	31.80
100s/50s	0/1	22/72	5/33	0/0
Top score	53	256	134*	35
Balls bowled	366	26,731	16,013	333
Wickets	10	415	415	10
Bowling average	28.00	32.90	29.55	42.30
5 wickets in innings	0	9	3	0
10 wickets in match	0	0	0	0
Best bowling	3/27	6/49	5/27	2/33
Catches/stumpings	3/–	272/3	176/1	7/0
- Source: Cricinfo, 12 February 2017

Mark Wayne Alleyne MBE (born 23 May 1968) is an English cricket coach and former first-class cricketer who made ten One Day International appearances for England between 1998/99 and 2000/01. He is the head coach at Gloucestershire County Cricket Club.

Classed as an all-rounder, he mostly batted in the middle of the order and bowled at a medium pace, but he has also kept wicket for both England and his county, Gloucestershire.

He is the first Black British and third Black overall to coach an English first-class cricket team after Derief Taylor and John Shepherd.

== Domestic career ==
Alleyne impressed early for Gloucestershire, scoring a century for them at 18 and a double-hundred at 22, being in both cases the youngest to achieve the feat for the county.

He replaced Jack Russell as captain in 1997, and in 2000 led Gloucestershire to two one-day cups and the National League title, just missing out on promotion in the County Championship, his achievements winning him a Wisden Cricketer of the Year spot. In the ensuing few years he became renowned as a leading tactician in the one-day form of county cricket, leading Gloucestershire to 4 one day knockout cups in 6 years.

In 2001, however, his performances fell away somewhat, especially with the bat, and Alleyne relinquished the captaincy to Chris Taylor in 2004. Indeed, he played just four county matches that year and did not make his first appearance in 2005 until 10 June.

== International career ==
On the 1998/99 tour of Australia he made his England debut at Brisbane.

In February 2020, he was named in England's squad for the Over-50s Cricket World Cup in South Africa. However, the tournament was cancelled during the third round of matches due to the coronavirus pandemic.

== Coaching career ==
After coach John Bracewell left Gloucestershire Cricket Club to join the New Zealand Test Team, Mark took over as Head Coach at Gloucestershire between 2004 and 2007 narrowly missing out on the Twenty20 title in 2007. He stood down as coach by mutual consent in February 2008 with nine months of his contract remaining. Alleyne then took up coaching at the National Performance Centre at Loughborough, where he coached the England Under-15s. In February 2009 he was named as the new MCC head coach, succeeding Clive Radley, who retired after a 48-year association with Lord's.

He subsequently became cricket professional at Marlborough College, a public school in Wiltshire. In 2022 he coached the England Men's T20I team on a tour of the Caribbean and in 2023 he served as white-ball coach for Glamorgan and Welsh Fire.

In February 2024 Gloucestershire announced his return as head coach.

== Personal life ==
Born in England, Alleyne is of Barbadian descent. At the age of 4, he moved with his parents to Barbados where he learned to play cricket, and returned to England 11 years later to further his education. His son Max Alleyne is a professional footballer for Premier League side Manchester City.

Alleyne was appointed Member of the Order of the British Empire (MBE) for services to cricket in the 2004 New Year Honours. As of 2009, he was Chairman of the Professional Cricket Coaches Association. In 2026 he published an autobiography (in collaboration with Stephen Chalke), titled Pack Your Bags, Brother.
