= James Averis =

English cricketer and rugby union footballer

Personal information
- Full name: James Maxwell Michael Averis
- Born: 28 May 1974 (age 52); Bristol, England
- Nickname: Fish
- Height: 5 ft 11 in (1.80 m)
- Batting: Right-handed
- Bowling: Right-arm medium

Domestic team information
- Years: Team
- 1997–2000: Oxford University Cricket Club
- 2000–2006: Gloucestershire
- Source: CricInfo, September 2006

James Maxwell Michael Averis (born 28 May 1974) is a retired English cricket player who played for the cricket teams of Oxford University and Gloucestershire. He also played professional rugby for Harlequins and Bristol.

== Early life ==
He attended Bristol Cathedral School and afterwards St Cross College, Oxford, on a Major Stanley's scholarship where he won blues at rugby and cricket in the same academic year.

== Rugby and cricket career ==
Averis established himself as a regular member of the one-day squad before breaking into the County Championship team in 2001. That year, as a fast-medium bowler, he was Gloucestershire's leading wicket-taker in both the National League and the Championship

.

One of several graduates in the Gloucestershire squad, Averis gained a prestigious reputation as a sportsman at Oxford. He was awarded Blues in cricket and rugby, and represented Bristol Rugby Club (making his 1st XV debut in 1994, kicking 5 penalties out of 5 against Exeter) and Harlequins before settling on cricket in 2000.

Bristol-born, he found himself thrown into the one-day side at the peak of its success at the turn of the century as the side won 8 trophies in 6 years. He claimed 29 National League victims in 2000, and continued performing very well in a less successful team performance in 2001. He also managed to hold his nerve in tense moments of the cup competitions, including the C&G final of 2004, where he claimed 4-23 including a hat trick.

His pace was a fairly constant 80+ mph, though he developed an excellent slower ball with the help of former team-mate Ian Harvey. He relied on accuracy and late movement, as well as the surprise slower ball and yorker, to claim most of his victims.

An invaluable member of the one day side, he was a reliable fielder and decent lower order batter, who looked as though he genuinely enjoyed his cricket. Averis retired from cricket in 2006 after 15 years at the club, so that he could concentrate on his law degree.

== Outside Sport ==
James Averis is now a Deputy Head and Geography teacher Clifton College in Bristol. He continues to coach cricket (coaching the 1st XI) and rugby (coaching the 3rd XV) to the boys there as well as his normal teaching duties in Geography.
