= Craig Spearman =

New Zealand cricketer

Personal information
- Full name: Craig Murray Spearman
- Born: 4 July 1972 (age 54); Auckland, New Zealand
- Nickname: Spears
- Height: 6 ft 0 in (1.83 m)
- Batting: Right-handed

International information
- National side: New Zealand (1995–2001)
- Test debut (cap 195): 8 December 1995 v Pakistan
- Last Test: 30 November 2000 v South Africa
- ODI debut (cap 96): 15 December 1995 v Pakistan
- Last ODI: 11 February 2001 v Sri Lanka

Domestic team information
- Years: Team
- 1993/94–1995/96: Auckland
- 1996/97–2004/05: Central Districts
- 2002–2009: Gloucestershire

Career statistics
Competition	Test	ODI	FC	LA
Matches	19	51	201	285
Runs scored	922	936	13,021	8,058
Batting average	26.34	18.71	37.85	29.73
100s/50s	1/3	0/5	30/56	8/52
Top score	112	86	341	153
Balls bowled	0	3	78	33
Wickets	–	0	1	0
Bowling average	–	–	55.00	–
5 wickets in innings	–	–	0	–
10 wickets in match	–	–	0	–
Best bowling	–	–	1/37	–
Catches/stumpings	21/–	15/–	197/–	104/–
Medal record
Men's cricket
Representing New Zealand
ICC Champions Trophy
Winner	2000 Kenya
- Source: Cricinfo, 4 May 2017

Craig Murray Spearman (born 4 July 1972) is an English-New Zealand former cricketer who played 19 Tests and 51 One Day Internationals for New Zealand from 1995 to 2001. Spearman was a member of the New Zealand team that won the 2000 ICC KnockOut Trophy.

He took his education from Kelston Boys High School, Auckland and then to Massey University, New Zealand.

== Domestic career ==
However, after meeting with fellow New Zealander, John Bracewell, he was asked to play for the team he was coaching, Gloucestershire County Cricket Club. Spearman immediately became a favourite in Bristol, when he hit a century in his first match.

In 2004 he hit 341 against Middlesex at Gloucester. His innings contained 40 fours and six sixes and was the highest ever score by a Gloucestershire batsman, beating the record of WG Grace. Since then he has continued to score runs and has gone on to add two more double centuries.

During a game against Oxford in 2005 he hit 34 runs off an over. In 2006 he became just the 4th player from his county to score a century in both innings against Northamptonshire. He finished the year with 1370 runs in the Championship. In 2009, he made only six Championship appearances with 206 runs at 22.88, and at the end of the year agreed to be released from his contract.

== International career ==
A right-handed opening batsman, Spearman made his international debut for New Zealand in a Test Match in December 1995 against Pakistan at Christchurch. He was never able to secure his spot in the side and only scored one Test hundred, an innings of 112 against Zimbabwe. He was, however, a member of the New Zealand squad for the 1996 Cricket World Cup. After giving up on his international career, he moved to England in 2001 to pursue a career in banking.
