= Jon Lewis (cricketer, born 1975) =

English cricketer and coach (born 1975)

Personal information
- Full name: Jonathan Lewis
- Born: 26 August 1975 (age 51); Aylesbury, Buckinghamshire, England
- Nickname: Lewy
- Height: 6 ft 3 in (1.91 m)
- Batting: Right-handed
- Bowling: Right arm medium
- Role: Bowler

International information
- National side: England
- Only Test (cap 634): 2 June 2006 v Sri Lanka
- ODI debut (cap 188): 16 June 2005 v Bangladesh
- Last ODI: 2 September 2007 v India
- ODI shirt no.: 18

Domestic team information
- Years: Team
- 1995–2011: Gloucestershire
- 2012–2013: Surrey
- 2014: Sussex (squad no. 4)

Career statistics
Competition	Test	ODI	FC	LA
Matches	1	13	251	232
Runs scored	27	50	4,963	1,000
Batting average	13.50	8.33	16.40	11.49
100s/50s	0/0	0/0	0/14	0/1
Top score	20	17	71	54
Balls bowled	246	716	44,877	10,372
Wickets	3	18	849	302
Bowling average	40.66	27.77	26.26	26.45
5 wickets in innings	0	0	35	2
10 wickets in match	0	0	5	0
Best bowling	3/68	4/36	8/95	5/19
Catches/stumpings	0/–	0/–	65/–	43/–
- Source: ESPNcricinfo, 3 October 2014

Jonathan Lewis (born 26 August 1975) is a former English cricketer who played for the England cricket team in Test, One Day International and Twenty20 International matches. Following his playing career, he became a coach and was in charge of England women's national cricket team from 2022 to 2025.

== Playing career ==
He was brought up in Swindon where he was educated at Churchfields School and Swindon College. He played for Swindon CC and, in Minor Counties cricket, for Wiltshire County Cricket Club in 1993. He joined Northamptonshire in 1994 and played for its Second XI but returned to Wiltshire in 1995. In the same year, he joined Gloucestershire and made his first-class debut. He was appointed Gloucestershire captain in 2006.

In 2005, Lewis was included in the England squad for the two Tests against Bangladesh, but did not play in either match. He did, however, make his first international appearance in the Twenty20 game against Australia in June, and took 4–24 in his four overs as England recorded a crushing 100-run victory. He made his One Day International debut a few days later in England's win against Bangladesh at The Oval, again impressing with 3–32 from ten overs. He was included in the 13-man squad for the home series against Sri Lanka in 2006, making his Test debut at Trent Bridge on 2 June 2006 and taking a wicket with his fourth delivery (and third legitimate ball) in Test cricket. He is the 634th player to represent England at Test cricket.

He was selected in a number of Test squads during the summer of 2006, but only played in one Test against Sri Lanka, coming to be regarded as something of a perennial 12th man. He did however bowl well in the ODIs against Pakistan, having finally been given an extended run in the side. Lewis was selected in England's 15-man squad for the Cricket World Cup 2007, which was held in the Caribbean. His last appearance for England occurred in the 2007 limited-overs series against India.

On 29 July 2011, it was announced that after 16 years with Gloucestershire, Lewis was to join Surrey on a two-year deal. Lewis left Surrey at the end of the 2013 season to join Sussex on a one-year contract ahead of the 2014 season. On 28 November 2014, Lewis announced his retirement from the professional game to become bowling coach at Sussex.

== Coaching career ==
In 2015, he was appointed as assistant head coach at Sussex County Cricket Club. In 2016, Lewis started as the head coach for England Young Lions. In March 2021, he was appointed as England Fast Bowling Coach, working with the likes of Jofra Archer, Mark Wood and Ben Stokes.

In 2022, Lewis was appointed as head coach of England Women's Cricket. Lewis and his new team played their 1st international series in the West Indies in December 2022. He was sacked by England Women in March 2025, after a run of poor results including an Ashes whitewash earlier that year.

In February 2023, Lewis was appointed as head coach of UP Warriorz in the inaugural Indian Women's Premier League. In June 2025, he left the role.

Lewis was appointed as director of cricket at Gloucestershire in October 2025.
