= Nottinghamshire County Cricket Club in 2005 =

2005 season of an English cricket team

Nottinghamshire Outlaws
2005 season
- Captain: Stephen Fleming
- Ground(s): Trent Bridge

Nottinghamshire County Cricket Club played their cricket in 2005 in Division One of both the County Championship and the totesport League. They started the season at 7–1 to win the title, and with a new captain, New Zealand's Stephen Fleming.

The first first-class game of the season was against Loughborough UCCE, a draw which merely provided batting practice to Notts. The first Sunday League game was a disappointing rain-affected loss against Middlesex. They then drew against the same team in the County Championship, before scoring their first win over four days against Sussex County Cricket Club. They then lost by the narrowest of margins on the Sunday to Lancashire, and then by just 4 runs to Glamorgan the next day.

On 4 May Nottinghamshire eased past Wales Minor Counties into the Second Round of the C&G Trophy. They then routed Surrey by an innings in their home ground The Oval before failing to chase a low target in the Sunday League against Worcestershire. On 18 May they lost to Sussex in the Second Round of the C&G Trophy, before losing to Kent and beating Gloucestershire in the Championship.

However, Nottinghamshire weren't to take part in that fight. They lost to Durham, Leicestershire and Derbyshire in quick succession, and not even a win over Yorkshire helped as they finished with six losses and two wins, and finished bottom of the North Division. That poor form did not carry through into the Championship, however, as Nottinghamshire quietly sneaked into second place with a win over Glamorgan, and they also recorded a rare one-day victory thanks to a century from captain Stephen Fleming against Hampshire. They enjoyed two further games without a loss, beating Warwickshire by ten wickets in the Championship, and playing a no-result with Northamptonshire in the National League.

In the last week of July, Nottinghamshire drew a match against Surrey, failing to push home the advantage after gaining a 90-run lead on first innings. August began with a week off, but on the 9th of that month, they bowled Gloucestershire out for 87 to take an eight-wicket win in the National League. A rain-ravaged Championship match at Trent Bridge with Middlesex ended in a draw, but their title hopes were dented after only scoring seven points after being bowled out for 181 in the first innings. However, an innings victory over Warwickshire gave them a temporary lead in Division One. Rain cancelled the match at Chelmsford against Essex, as Nottinghamshire suffered their third no-result of the season. Six days later, they lost to Northamptonshire, cementing their last place in the National League. In the County Championship, however, fortunes were reversed, as they beat Glamorgan comfortably to go top of the Championship yet again. They extended their lead with a two-day victory over Gloucestershire, and also beat Gloucestershire in the National League, in a low-scoring match where 233 runs were scored in total, for the loss of 19 wickets.

The return of captain Stephen Fleming following international commitments boosted Nottinghamshire, as they beat Worcestershire by five wickets in the National League to give themselves more hope of avoiding relegation in that competition. Then, Nottinghamshire secured the County Championship title with a 204-run win over Kent. However, Hampshire criticised the Kent captain for "ridiculous" tactics , which robbed his team of any chance of the Championship title, and Hampshire got their revenge as Nottinghamshire lost by an innings and 188 runs at the Rose Bowl. Nottinghamshire eventually finished 2.5 points ahead of Hampshire in the final table, but got revenge in the National League, recording a 37-run victory that sent Hampshire down into Division Two.

== Players ==
- David Hussey
- David Alleyne
- Darren Bicknell
- Gareth Clough
- Mark Ealham
- Mark Footitt
- Paul Franks
- Jason Gallian
- Andrew Harris
- Richard Hodgkinson
- Paul McMahon
- Samit Patel
- Chris Read
- Ryan Sidebottom
- Anurag Singh
- Greg Smith
- Will Smith
- Graeme Swann
- Russell Warren
- Jason Gallian

== Tables ==
=== Championship ===
2005 County Championship – Division One
Pos	Team	Pld	W	D	L	Pen	BP	Pts
1	Nottinghamshire	16	9	4	3	0	94	236
2	Hampshire	16	9	4	3	0.5	92	233.5
3	Sussex	16	7	6	3	0	102	224
4	Warwickshire	16	8	3	5	0.5	86	209.5
5	Kent	16	6	7	3	8.5	99	202.5
6	Middlesex	16	4	7	5	0.5	98	181.5
7	Surrey	16	4	9	3	8.5	97	180.5
8	Gloucestershire	16	1	5	10	2	72	104
9	Glamorgan	16	1	1	14	0	71	88.5

=== totesport League ===
2005 totesport League – Division One
Pos	Team	Pld	W	L	NR	Pts
1	Essex Eagles	16	13	1	2	56
2	Middlesex Crusaders	16	10	5	1	42
3	Northamptonshire Steelbacks	16	7	7	2	32
4	Glamorgan Dragons	16	6	6	4	32
5	Nottinghamshire Outlaws	16	6	7	3	30
6	Lancashire Lightning	16	6	9	1	26
7	Gloucestershire Gladiators	16	6	9	1	26
8	Worcestershire Royals	16	5	10	1	22
9	Hampshire Hawks	16	5	10	1	22

== Match details ==
=== Nottinghamshire v Loughborough UCCE (13–15 April) ===
Match drawn

At Trent Bridge Loughborough UCCE won the toss and elected to bat. This allowed Nottinghamshire's Greg Smith to show off his left arm fast-medium bowling that Loughborough's inexperienced students could not cope with. Smith took 5 for 19 as Loughborough UCCE made only 164 to be bowled out before tea. After tea, Darren Bicknell and Jason Gallian scored at a steady 3 runs an over to leave Notts 67 without loss at close on the first day.

The Nottinghamshire innings continued and took up all the second day, and the batsmen got useful match practice before their Championship season started. The highlight was Anurag Singh's 131 from 176 balls with 23 fours and a six. Three other batsmen made half-centuries, including Darren Bicknell, whose 91 took up five minutes short of five hours. The pick of the bowling came from Loughborough UCCE's left-arm spinner David Wainwright. Nottinghamshire were 467 for 8 at close on the second day.

Nottinghamshire continued their innings on the third and final day, allowing Graeme Swann to make his half-century, finishing with 63 off 59 balls. They were finally all out for 532 off 130 overs. Wainwright finished on 4 for 109. This did not leave enough time for Loughborough UCCE to be dismissed a second time. They only needed to survive 47 overs. That seemed in doubt when they tumbled to 38 for 3, before the ship was steadied, and they scored 185 for 4 to claim the draw. Wicket-keeper Paul Harrison scored 54. (Cricinfo scorecard)

=== Nottinghamshire v Middlesex (17 April) ===
Middlesex (4pts) beat Nottinghamshire (0pts) by 35 runs (D/L method)

At Trent Bridge, Chad Keegan took career best figures of 6 for 33 as Nottinghamshire Outlaws were bowled out for 173. By the time Keegan had finished they were 75 for 6, but the tail wagged. Middlesex Crusaders scored 91 for 0 off 21.3 overs, thanks to a half-century from Paul Weekes, when rain brought an end to the match. Middlesex were comfortable winners on the Duckworth-Lewis method. (BBC scorecard)

=== Middlesex v Nottinghamshire (20–23 April) ===
Middlesex (9pts) drew with Nottinghamshire (12pts)

The first day at Lord's saw Nottinghamshire, who were put in to bat, progress to 399 for 6, thanks to 117 not out from Australian David Hussey. Alan Richardson starred for Middlesex, taking 5 wickets on his county debut.

Nottinghamshire batted on to 546 all out on the second day, despite losing Hussey for just one more added run. Paul Franks scored a century, and Richardson increased his tally to 7 for 113. In response to this, Middlesex fared poorly, whilst fast-medium bowler Greg Smith removed the top order. The home side finished on 167 for 6, but were rescued on the third day when Irishman Ed Joyce took his score up to 192. Middlesex finished on 345, 201 behind. Stephen Fleming chose not to enforce the follow-on, and amassed a lead of 413 when they declared on 212 for 5. Maybe the Notts bowlers were tired, but it seemed like negative play with rain predicted for the fourth day.

And the rain did come, with only 57 overs possible. Middlesex had progressed to 158 for 2 before play was abandoned, which suggested Notts might have struggled to win anyway. (Cricinfo scorecard)

=== Nottinghamshire v Sussex (27–30 April) ===
Nottinghamshire (22pts) beat Sussex (6pts) by ten wickets

Only 36.3 overs were possible on the first day at Trent Bridge. Sussex batted first and, despite losing 2 early wickets, were 116 for 2 at close, with Michael Yardy (38) and Murray Goodwin (33) the not out batsmen. Yardy went on to make a half-century, as did wicket-keeper Matt Prior and Robin Martin-Jenkins, but no-one went further than 66 on the second day, as Sussex were dismissed for 379. Nottinghamshire progressed slowly, and were 32 for no loss off 15 overs at close.

The third day was all Nottinghamshire's. Jason Gallian made his highest score for the county, 199, while Stephen Fleming, who took over as captain from Gallian this season, made 111. Both were run out by precise throws from Ian Ward and Mushtaq Ahmed respectively. David Hussey (89) and Chris Read (45 not out) gave good support as Notts reached 488 for 6 at close.

On the fourth day, Nottinghamshire declared after 5.5 overs on 509 for 8, a lead of 130. If they were to win, they'd have to dismiss Sussex quickly. This they did. Ryan Sidebottom took 4 for 15 as Sussex were dismissed for 159, despite a two-hour 49 from Martin-Jenkins. Darren Bicknell and Jason Gallian only needed 5.5 overs to knock off the 30 runs needed to win. (Cricinfo scorecard)

=== Lancashire v Nottinghamshire (1 May) ===
Lancashire (4pts) beat Nottinghamshire (0pts) by 1 run (D/L method)

Lancashire Lightning held on to win by 1 run after Nottinghamshire Outlaws needed 7 to win off the last over. Earlier new Englishman Stuart Law made 52 as the Lightning got to 178 for 8 off their 43 overs. England fans would have been pleased to see James Anderson take 3 for 18 from his 8 overs in reply as the Outlaws went to 170 for 6 with 12 balls to go, needing 9 to win. But Sajid Mahmood (who only conceded 2 from the penultimate over) and Dominic Cork saw Lancashire win a nailbiter. (BBC scorecard)

=== Nottinghamshire v Glamorgan (2 May) ===
Glamorgan (4pts) beat Nottinghamshire (0pts) by 4 runs (D/L method)

Glamorgan finally managed to record a win at Trent Bridge after two "no results". In an innings that turned out to be restricted to 38 overs, they scored 204 for 4, which by the Duckworth-Lewis method was converted into a target of 222 for the Nottinghamshire Outlaws. In reply the Outlaws were 52 for 4 before rearguard actions by David Hussey (68) and Chris Read (47) lifted them to a challenge. Despite two sixes from Samit Patel in his 40, Nottinghamshire fell 4 runs short of par to end on 217 for 8. (BBC scorecard)

=== Wales Minor Counties v Nottinghamshire (4 May) ===
Nottinghamshire beat Wales Minor Counties by 6 wickets to progress to Round Two of the C&G Trophy

After a four-and-a-half hour rain delay, Wales Minor Counties batted first at Swansea, and fared poorly. The only score of any note came from Willy Bragg, an 18-year-old left-hander, currently in the middle of his A-Level exams. He made an undefeated 41 runs, as Wales Minor Counties were dismissed for 119. Mark Ealham took 4 for 28 and Andrew Harris 3 for 31. Nottinghamshire were never really threatened, but did lose 4 wickets in making 121 off 26.2 overs. (Cricinfo scorecard)

=== Surrey v Nottinghamshire (6–9 May) ===
Nottinghamshire (22pts) beat Surrey (3pts) by an innings and 71 runs

Nottinghamshire routed Surrey at The Oval after Surrey self-destructed to Mark Ealham in the first innings. Surrey were looking for quick runs and got that, but did not last fifty overs as Ealham took four of their men for 53 runs. James Benning was top-scorer with 56 runs off 43 balls, with nine fours and a six, and Surrey finished with 217 in 49.1 overs. By contrast, Darren Bicknell and Jason Gallian scored at a more sedate pace for Nottinghamshire, plodding along at 3.5 runs an over - but got the runs. An opening partnership of 178 gave Nottinghamshire the edge, and despite losing Anurag Singh for a duck, they were only trailing by thirteen runs at stumps.

New Zealand captain Stephen Fleming then had a blast for Nottinghamshire. With everything going wrong for Surrey, they just couldn't find any bite, conceded 26 runs off no-balls, and were penalised five runs for ball-tampering, while Fleming smashed 238 runs for his third double-century of his career. With partnerships of 150 runs or more with both Gallian and Australian David Hussey, all the Surrey bowlers were smashed, as Nottinghamshire eased their way to 580 for 4 at stumps on day 2 and eventually 692 for 7 declared. Despite Surrey batting with more composure in the second innings, surviving for 141 overs, the damage was done, and even a two-hour break for rain couldn't save them as they were bowled out for 404, Graeme Swann taking four for 94 with his off-spin while the former England batsman Mark Ramprakash scored his third century of the Championship season with a six-hour 107. (Cricinfo scorecard)

=== Worcestershire v Nottinghamshire (15 May) ===
Worcestershire (4pts) beat Nottinghamshire (0pts) by 16 runs

Nottinghamshire Outlaws recorded their fourth successive loss, this time at New Road to Worcestershire. It was the Africans who made the most impact, as Zander de Bruyn's 62 laid the foundation for a target of 191 that was to become too large for the visitors, while the exiled Zimbabwean spinner Ray Price took four wickets for 21. With Nottinghamshire's overseas players, Stephen Fleming (5) and David Hussey (2) being removed early by Sri Lankan fast bowler Chaminda Vaas, the visitors were in trouble, and Price and de Bruyn - who came on first and second change - tied them down effectively, with 4-21 and 0-20 respectively. Even Paul Franks' and Gareth Clough's late attempts at hitting runs backfired, and Nottinghamshire were bowled out for 174. (Cricinfo scorecard)

=== Sussex v Nottinghamshire (18 May) ===
Sussex beat Nottinghamshire by 4 wickets to progress to the Quarter-Finals of the C&G Trophy

Nottinghamshire got off to a bad start at Hove by losing their first 3 wickets for only 12 runs. They continued to lose wickets at regular intervals until the score moved on to 111 for 8, when Samit Patel (61) and Gareth Clough (22) came together and lifted the total to 195 for 9 off the 50 overs. Three Nottinghamshire batsmen were run out. Sussex immediately lost Ian Ward and Mike Yardy, moving to 1 run for 2 wickets. However, the ship was steadied with half-centuries from Murray Goodwin and Carl Hopkinson and they eventually eased through with 3 wickets and 18 balls to go. The win, however, came at a price for Sussex, who now had to play Lancashire away in the next round, rather than host the touring Australians in a 3-day game. The cost of the win was estimated at £50,000. (Cricinfo scorecard)

=== Nottinghamshire v Kent (20–23 May) ===
Kent (20pts) beat Nottinghamshire (3pts) by 196 runs

Trent Bridge was lucky to escape most of the rain that ravaged the sixth round of the Championship, as over 100 overs was possible on the first day in which Kent could rack up 301 runs in their first innings, after being put in to bat by Nottinghamshire's captain Stephen Fleming. Kent's David Fulton and Rob Key paired up to score 81 for the first wicket, but former Yorkshire bowler Ryan Sidebottom came back to remove the three top order batsmen. Sidebottom finished with his five for 61, while the Irish wicket-keeper Niall O'Brien top-scored with 64 on season debut for Kent, taking over from Geraint Jones who had been called up to play Tests for England.

In reply, Nottinghamshire collapsed uncharacteristically, with Simon Cook taking four for 38 as only opener Darren Bicknell passed 25 in Nottinghamshire's innings. At stumps on day 2, Nottinghamshire were 169 for 9, just ahead of the follow-on target, and the last pair added a further 15 early on. Kent scored runs briskly, and despite both their South Africans - Martin van Jaarsveld and Andrew Hall - getting ducks, they racked up 298 for 8 in 72 overs - helped by the 32 extras. Nottinghamshire, chasing a massive 416 to win, imploded, Danish bowler Amjad Khan taking the wickets of David Hussey and Chris Read in quick succession to, with the help of Minaf Patel, reduce the hosts from 114 for 3 to 116 for 6. Even a last-wicket stand of 73 between Sidebottom (31) and 20-year-old Oliver Newby (38 not out) did not help, as Patel eventually had Sidebottom stumped. Hall got the best bowling figures for Kent in the second innings, recording four for 42 including both Nottinghamshire openers. (Cricinfo scorecard)

=== Gloucestershire v Nottinghamshire (25–27 May) ===
Nottinghamshire (22pts) beat Gloucestershire (4.5pts) by an innings and 27 runs

At Bristol, the visiting captain Stephen Fleming from Nottinghamshire won the toss and chose to bat - a wise choice, as it turned out, as only Mark Hardinges took wickets, but he conceded many runs in the process, finishing with four for 115. Gloucestershire were toothless, conceding 28 runs off no-balls, while their No. 5 David Hussey was deprived of a century when the team collapsed around him, finishing on 98 not out. With a run rate of above four in their 469 all out, they were putting pressure on the hosts, who started sedately without losing wickets. However, a spell from Ryan Sidebottom resulted in three wickets falling with only one run being scored, and that gave Northamptonshire the edge in the game. Gloucestershire were eventually bowled out for 250, as Mark Ealham removed the tail with three for 26 off 16 overs (with ten maidens), and, being forced to follow on, Gloucestershire lost both openers before stumps to have scored three runs for two wickets.

The rot continued on day 3, as Ealham and Sidebottom took more wickets, and Gloucestershire crashed to 56 for 5. Despite a lower-order partnership worth 77 between James Pearson (68) and Sri Lankan international Upul Chandana (49) for the seventh wicket, Gloucestershire were still all out for 192 - 27 runs short of making Nottinghamshire bat again. To compound the misery, Gloucestershire lost half a point for a slow over rate, and the result seemed to cement them near the bottom of the Division 1 table, as they lost contact with Middlesex and Sussex to settle in eighth place. (Cricinfo scorecard)

=== Nottinghamshire v Essex (30 May) ===
Essex (4pts) beat Nottinghamshire (0pts) by six wickets

Former England international Darren Gough took four wickets for 16 runs, including both opening batsmen, as Essex Eagles strolled to a six-wicket win at Trent Bridge over Nottinghamshire Outlaws. Nottinghamshire were bowled out for 154 as Essex off-spinner James Middlebrook chipped in with two for 27 including the wicket of top-scorer David Hussey. Essex' batsmen all got starts in the chase, and captain Ronnie Irani, opening the batting, anchored the innings with a fine run-a-ball 53. (Cricinfo scorecard)

=== Nottinghamshire v Hampshire (1–4 June) ===
Hampshire (17pts) beat Nottinghamshire (4pts) by 14 runs

Hampshire pulled off a close win on the final day against their title rivals. There was no play on the first day at Trent Bridge because of rain. When play did get underway, Hampshire batted first, making 277 as Andrew Harris took 6 for 83. Nine Hampshire batsmen made double-figure scores, with only Kevin Pietersen (two-ball 0) and No. 11 Richard Logan dismissed for a one-digit score. More rain meant that Nottinghamshire were only on 222 for 5 in reply by the end of the third day. With both teams eager for the 14 points on offer for an outright victory, terms were agreed to between the two sides. Nottinghamshire declared overnight, and Hampshire replied by hitting 220 for 4 off 28.3 overs. These overs were bowled by Jason Gallian, David Hussey and Darren Bicknell - players who on average bowled a couple of overs a match, but who now bowled as Hampshire were invited to score quickly. Hussey got career best figures of four for 105. Nottinghamshire were set 276 to win, and a century from Stephen Fleming saw the hosts to 227 for 3, but after that they collapsed, losing their last five wickets for three runs, with Chris Tremlett taking 5 for 80, including a hat-trick as Hampshire edged the victory. (Cricinfo scorecard)

=== Glamorgan v Nottinghamshire (5 June) ===
Match abandoned - Glamorgan (2pts), Nottinghamshire (2pts)

This match, which was due to be played at Swansea, was abandoned without a ball being bowled because of rain. (Cricinfo scorecard)

=== Nottinghamshire v Lancashire (12 June) ===
Nottinghamshire (4pts) beat Lancashire (0pts) by 61 runs

Lancashire crumbled in chase of Nottinghamshire's big target of 250 at Trent Bridge. Winning the toss and fielding, Lancashire got wickets at crucial moments, and had Nottinghamshire at 77 for 5 at one point. However, former England wicketkeeper Chris Read contributed with 68 not out - including five fours and four sixes - and with Mark Ealham scoring 35 as well, only James Anderson managed to stop the rot slightly by removing Ealham. Lancashire's bowling was at times wayward, and 26 wides were noted down in the extras column. In reply, Lancashire sold their wickets all too cheaply, as starts were made but not converted and number nine Dominic Cork top-scored with 40. Lancashire crumbled to 188 all out in 41.3 overs, well short of the target. (Cricinfo scorecard)

=== Sussex v Nottinghamshire (15–18 June) ===
Sussex (11pts) drew with Nottinghamshire (11pts)

A rain-ravaged match at Arundel, where only seven overs were possible on the second day, ended in a drab draw. Batting first, Sussex needed seven sessions of play to make 355, despite only facing 87 overs, and Nottinghamshire weren't overly excited in getting a result, either. Matt Prior, Murray Goodwin (in the second innings) and Chris Adams (also in the second innings) made tons for Sussex in the match, Stephen Fleming made one for the visitors, and Sussex' Jason Lewry was the pick of the bowlers with six for 74. (Cricinfo scorecard)

=== Middlesex v Nottinghamshire (19 June) ===
Middlesex (4pts) beat Nottinghamshire (0pts) by 31 runs

Middlesex Crusaders used their home batting paradise at Southgate to good effect, smashing Nottinghamshire Outlaws bowlers to all corners as they amassed 314 for 7 in 45 overs - Paul Weekes top-scoring with a run-a-ball 106, while Irishman Ed Joyce pushed the accelerator in the final overs with an 18-ball 41 including six boundaries. In reply, Nottinghamshire were always going to be in trouble after crashing to 86 for 4, Weekes ripping out two wickets, but Samit Patel and Chris Read lifted them to 231 for 5 before Alan Richardson removed them both. That ended the Nottinghamshire resistance, as they subsided for 283, 31 runs short with three deliveries remaining. (Cricinfo scorecard)

=== Leicestershire v Nottinghamshire (22 June) ===
Leicestershire (2pts) beat Nottinghamshire (0pts) by five wickets

A disciplined bowling and fielding effort, conceding only five extras, was the key to Leicestershire Foxes' win at Grace Road. Nottinghamshire Outlaws won the toss and batted first, but after Nottinghamshire skipper Stephen Fleming found four boundaries in his twelve-ball 24, Jeremy Snape and Dinesh Mongia tied down the Nottinghamshire batsmen. Only Leicestershire seamer Darren Maddy, who bowled two overs for 33, gave the visitors' total score of 143 for 8 a glimmer of respect. The chase was close and exciting, however, as Leicestershire lost HD Ackerman and Maddy in succession to go to 16 for 2. At 103 for 5, things looked grim, but a crucial partnership between Paul Nixon and Ottis Gibson won them the game with four balls to spare. (Cricinfo scorecard)

=== Nottinghamshire v Lancashire (24 June) ===
Nottinghamshire (2pts) beat Lancashire (0pts) by 92 runs

Nottinghamshire Outlaws plundered runs off the Lancashire Lightning fast bowlers at Trent Bridge, to recover from their first-game loss to Leicestershire. Both James Anderson and Glen Chapple were taken for 53 in four overs each, as the Outlaws made 198 for 5. In reply, only Steven Crook passed 20 for Lancashire, Graeme Swann took three for 32 and Mark Ealham two for 22, and Lancashire ended up with an inadequate 106 all out. (Cricinfo scorecard)

=== Nottinghamshire v Yorkshire (26 June) ===
Yorkshire (2pts) beat Nottinghamshire (0pts) by two wickets

Tim Bresnan's onslaught of fast bowling resulted in three quick wickets for Yorkshire Phoenix, yet he was only called upon to bowl three overs - for 22 runs - and Nottinghamshire Outlaws were let off the hook. Chris Read top-scored with 43 off 35, propelling the hosts to 170 for 8. An excellent start by Ian Harvey and Michael Lumb sent Yorkshire to 60 for 1, as Harvey found boundaries seemingly at will - when he was out for 74 (with 64 of them in boundaries), however, Yorkshire imploded from 121 for 2 to 135 for 6. Craig White and Ismail Dawood fought back, and number 10 Richard Dawson won them the match with a two and a four, as Yorkshire needed four runs from the last three deliveries of the game. (Cricinfo scorecard)

=== Durham v Nottinghamshire (28 June) ===
Durham (2pts) beat Nottinghamshire (0pts) by six wickets

Durham Dynamos got back on track with a closely fought six-wicket win at Riverside. Mark Ealham had some fun with Durham bowler Neil Killeen as he thumped six sixes in a 17-ball 45, and his partnership with Chris Read threatened to lift Nottinghamshire Outlaws to a much bigger score than their final 179. However, four wickets from Jamaican-born Gareth Breese helped stem the tide. In reply, Nathan Astle and Gordon Muchall both made 64 - the latter a not out - and Ealham was smashed about, conceding 51 runs in four overs. It was almost as bad for Andrew Harris, who conceded 38 off 15 legitimate deliveries as Durham won with three balls to spare. (Cricinfo scorecard)

=== Nottinghamshire v Leicestershire (30 June) ===
Leicestershire (2pts) beat Nottinghamshire (0pts) by 21 runs

Leicestershire Foxes took the win at Trent Bridge in a low-scoring match. Nottinghamshire Outlaws had won the toss and bowled first, and ought to have been pretty pleased with restricting the Foxes to 150 for 4, even though they conceded 15 extras. The opening partnership of HD Ackerman and Darren Maddy for 67 runs had promised more for Leicestershire. However, West Indian Ottis Gibson dug out two early wickets in Graeme Swann and Stephen Fleming - Darren Maddy and David Masters then took wickets at leisure, and Nottinghamshire were 96 for 7. Despite a rescue mission from Gareth Clough who hit 30 off 16 balls, there was no hitting power from the other players, and Nottinghamshire finished on 129 for 8. (Cricinfo scorecard)

=== Nottinghamshire v Derbyshire (1 July) ===
Derbyshire (2pts) beat Nottinghamshire (0pts) by four wickets

Derbyshire Phantoms needed to win to have a chance of qualifying for the quarter-finals - and did it, in a thriller finish. Nottinghamshire Outlaws batted first, and Will Smith and Chris Read made 51 and 44 not out respectively. The pair where the only two Nottinghamshire batsmen to pass 20, their contributions lifted the hosts to 147 for 8. Michael di Venuto and Luke Sutton took Derbyshire to 92 for 1 before economical bowling chipped away at Derbyshire's batting. However, captain Sutton kept a cool head, anchoring the chase with 61 not out in 54 balls as Derbyshire won with two balls to spare. (Cricinfo scorecard)

=== Yorkshire v Nottinghamshire (3 July) ===
Nottinghamshire (2pts) beat Yorkshire (0pts) by six wickets

Nottinghamshire won the toss at Headingley and put Yorkshire into bat. The hosts suffered an immediate setback when Ian Harvey was out from the first ball to Andrew Harris, but Craig White and Phil Jaques settled the ship, with Jaques going on to score 55 off 33 balls. Rich Pyrah finished the innings with 31 off 17 as Yorkshire set their guests a target of 181 to win. The start of Nottinghamshire's innings was the opposite to Yorkshire's: openers Will Smith (55) and Graeme Swann (62) put on 101 before they were parted, as Swann slashed nine fours, three sixes, and also had time to run eight times across the pitch in a 25-ball frenzy. Yorkshire took the next four wickets for 50 runs, with leg spinner Mark Lawson grabbing two, and with a high total to chase the game was in the balance. However, Chris Read's 28 off 18 balls saw Nottinghamshire home with just two balls to go. (Cricinfo scorecard)

=== Derbyshire v Nottinghamshire (6 July) ===
Derbyshire (2pts) beat Nottinghamshire (0pts) by nine wickets

Nottinghamshire Outlaws were limited to 139 for 5 by economical Derbyshire Phantoms bowling - which allowed them to take singles and not much more at Derby. Only ten boundaries were hit during Nottinghamshire's innings, all in fours, and Chris Read - usually a man with a high strike-rate - was limited to 29 off 31 balls. The Derbyshire reply was spearheaded by Michael di Venuto who made an unbeaten 77 and added 92 with Jonathan Moss for the second wicket. Derbyshire passed their target with nine wickets and 20 balls in hand, and the victory gave them a quarter-final berth. (Cricinfo scorecard)

=== Nottinghamshire v Glamorgan (8–11 July) ===
Nottinghamshire (22pts) beat Glamorgan (5pts) by ten wickets

Glamorgan continued on their woeful season, enduring their eighth loss in nine County Championship games, this time to Nottinghamshire at Trent Bridge. The hosts won the toss and sent Glamorgan in to bat, and got wickets, admittedly while conceding runs quickly in the process - the final score was 261 in 61 overs. Chris Read, the former England wicket-keeper, then made his fifth first-class century with a 117-ball ton, only to be departed by Nottinghamshire's last man Mark Footitt shortly afterwards - left stranded on 103 not out. Nottinghamshire, however, had made it to a total of 425, and Footitt made amends with the ball, taking four for 45 amid no-balls and wides. Glamorgan were swiftly taken out for 214, as nine batsmen made it into double figures but none could go beyond 35, and Nottinghamshire openers Darren Bicknell and Jason Gallian eased past the target of 57 as Nottinghamshire recorded a full-score win. (Cricinfo scorecard)

=== Nottinghamshire v Hampshire (17 July) ===
Nottinghamshire (4pts) beat Hampshire (0pts) by one wicket

Captain Stephen Fleming stood tall for Nottinghamshire Outlaws winning them the game as they chased down 241 at Trent Bridge. Hampshire Hawks had batted first, and no Hawk batsman converted their starts, and Gareth Clough's two for 44 threatened to stop their innings prematurely, as they were 152 for 6 when Kevin Latouf gave a return catch to Samit Patel. However, a big seventh-wicket partnership between Dimitri Mascarenhas and Sean Ervine lifted Hampshire to 240 for 8. Mascarenhas and Ervine also grabbed two wickets each in the Nottinghamshire reply, and things looked grim for the hosts when Chris Read departed for 4 with Nottinghamshire still needing 114 runs for the last four wickets.

However, Fleming and Mark Ealham put the chase back on with a partnership of 75, before Hampshire struck again with wickets in successive overs, and then Shaun Udal had Greg Smith lbw for 6. Needing 15 for the last wicket, Fleming shielded Andrew Harris from strike (Harris faced three balls in a partnership of 19), to end with 102 not out - his sixteenth one-day century - to win the match for Nottinghamshire with an over to spare. Notable also was the 36 extras Hampshire conceded, including six penalty runs. (Cricinfo scorecard)

=== Warwickshire v Nottinghamshire (20–22 July) ===
Nottinghamshire (20pts) beat Warwickshire (4pts) by ten wickets

An eventful match at Edgbaston looked to give Nottinghamshire the lead in the County Championship, as they swept aside Warwickshire with few problems. The Warwickshire batting line-up sorely missed Ian Bell, who was on Test match duty for England, and after an opening partnership of 101 between Nic Knight and Ian Westwood, an implosion followed. Warwickshire faltered to 168 for 8, and only 21-year-old Luke Parker, playing his seventh first-class match, saved them from a sub-200 score as he made an unbeaten 34.

Warwickshire's bowling, which lacked an injured Heath Streak, also suffered, and despite excellent figures of six for 92 from Alex Loudon the Nottinghamshire batsmen ran away with it as Darren Bicknell, Jason Gallian and Australian David Hussey all made fifties. Then, it was a Nottinghamshire spinner's turn to take centre stage - Graeme Swann. In 23 overs, he took six for 57, including the entire Warwickshire middle order from three to six - only Westwood passed 25, and Warwickshire could only muster 133. As if to make the humiliation complete, Swann was promoted to number 1, and hit one boundary and four additional runs before stumps were drawn after one over. Nottinghamshire were eight for no loss overnight, chasing 12 to win, and Darren Bicknell hit the winning runs off Dewald Pretorius four balls into the fourth day. (Cricinfo scorecard)

=== Nottinghamshire v Northamptonshire (24 July) ===
No result; Nottinghamshire (2pts), Northamptonshire (2pts)

Only 26 deliveries were bowled at Trent Bridge by Greg Smith and Mark Ealham of the Nottinghamshire Outlaws, who conceded 20 runs to Martin Love as Northamptonshire Steelbacks moved to 25 for 0 before rain stopped the game for good. (Cricinfo scorecard)

=== Nottinghamshire v Surrey (26–29 July) ===
Nottinghamshire (8pts) drew with Surrey (7pts)

Surrey batted first at Trent Bridge, after Mark Ramprakash had won the toss, but despite Ramprakash making 42 the Nottinghamshire bowlers were completely in control. Andrew Harris took three for 55, Greg Smith removed three wickets in quick succession as Surrey fell from 53 for 1 to 57 for 4, and Surrey were bowled out for 136 with only four batsmen making their way into double figures. Nottinghamshire's reply lasted 66 overs, after eight wickets had fallen in 53 overs on the first day to take the first day wicket tally to 18, and Martin Bicknell got six for 56 with his swing bowling, his best return of the season. However, Nottinghamshire could thank Mark Ealham who negotiated the difficult conditions well to make 55 as Nottinghamshire earned a 90-run lead.

Surrey lost wickets regularly in the reply on day two, Scott Newman resisting with 40, but by stumps on day two they were 93 for 3 - rain having limited the day's play to 40 overs, yet a result looked very probable. However, day three was rained off, and an unbeaten century from Rikki Clarke sent Surrey into a good position at 292 for 6, where they declared to leave Nottinghamshire 203 runs from 40 overs. Nottinghamshire made a good attempt at chasing it, but lost five wickets quickly for 90 runs to Azhar Mahmood and Mohammad Akram. David Alleyne and Mark Ealham dug in before two quick wickets fell, but Ryan Sidebottom shut up shop with Smith to hold on for the draw. (Cricinfo scorecard)

=== Gloucestershire v Nottinghamshire (9 August) ===
Nottinghamshire (4pts) beat Gloucestershire (0pts) by eight wickets

Gloucestershire Gladiators were gracious hosts at Cheltenham College, as they allowed themselves to be beaten by eight wickets and bowled out for 87 by Nottinghamshire Outlaws. Despite the low scores, it took a whole 35.1 overs to get them out, Ramnaresh Sarwan and Mark Alleyne gluing to the crease for scores of 15 off 46 balls and 11 off 28 balls respectively. All the bowlers got wickets, with the exception of spinner Samit Patel, who nevertheless got fine figures of 5-2-7-0. Pakistani batsman and part-time leg-spinner Younis Khan, with only ten List A wickets to his name, got three for 5 - including Sarwan and Alleyne - to wrap up Gloucestershire's resistance. In reply, Anurag Singh hit an unbeaten 30 and Younis Khan 28 not out as Nottinghamshire eased to the target in half the time allotted. (Cricinfo scorecard)

=== Nottinghamshire v Middlesex (10–13 August) ===
Nottinghamshire (7pts) drew with Middlesex (10pts)

Andrew Harris took four expensive wickets for Nottinghamshire on the first day of the match against Middlesex at Trent Bridge. The match was left hanging in the balance overnight as Middlesex made 325, mostly thanks to 128 from Ed Smith, who made his second century of the first-class season. Ryan Sidebottom was economical, but went wicketless in his 15 overs, while Mark Ealham took two key wickets, of Smith and Owais Shah. Nottinghamshire lost no wicket in the 12 overs before stumps, making 33, but on the second day they quickly lost wickets to the medium pace of Peter Trego, which yielded career-best figures of six for 59.

Graeme Swann's 53 lifted Nottinghamshire to a somewhat respectable 181, but batting was easier than Nottinghamshire had made it look. Owais Shah and Ed Joyce added 225 for the third wicket to prove exactly that. Shah ended with an unbeaten 173, while Joyce got his third century of the season with 101, and Jamie Dalrymple also added 45 before he was lbw to Younis Khan. The wicket of Dalrymple precipitated a declaration, which set Nottinghamshire 530 to win in four sessions. Nottinghamshire, however, batted well in the evening session on the third day, making 107 for no loss, and after eight overs on day four rain set in and the two captains agreed to a draw. (Cricinfo scorecard)

=== Nottinghamshire v Warwickshire (14–16 August) ===
Nottinghamshire (22pts) beat Warwickshire (2.5pts) by an innings and 151 runs

Ryan Sidebottom dug out the top four, ending with four for 41, and Andrew Harris got exactly the same figures (but from half the overs), as Warwickshire crashed to 156 at Trent Bridge after winning the toss and opting to bat first. And from then on, it only got worse for the visitors from the Midlands. Only Dougie Brown's 34 not out took them past 150, and he then took two wickets as Nottinghamshire looked to go the same way - being 45 for 3. However, David Hussey and Chris Read batted well together, seeing Nottinghamshire to stumps and making fifties. Their 148-run partnership gave Nottinghamshire a healthy lead, but Hussey did not stop there. He made a career-best 232 not out - eventually running out of partners as Nottinghamshire finished on 514, to secure a first-innings lead of 358. Brown took five for 128, but despite bowling the most overs of all he could not stop the rampant Hussey. Nick Knight was injured and could not bat, so with ten men Warwickshire had to score 358 to make Nottinghamshire bat again. It was an impossible task - Alex Loudon and Neil Carter both made scores in the forties, but the team succumbed to 207 and their third innings defeat of the season. Warwickshire were later deducted 0.5 points for a slow over rate on day two. (Cricinfo scorecard)

=== Essex v Nottinghamshire (22 August) ===
No result; Essex (2pts), Nottinghamshire (2pts)

Essex Eagles edged closer to the National League title with two points at Chelmsford, though rain ravaged the game. Only eight overs of play were possible before the umpires called off the game, and in that time Essex lost both openers but still made 53 for 2 - a score including six wides bowled by the Nottinghamshire Outlaws bowlers. (Cricinfo scorecard)

=== Northamptonshire v Nottinghamshire (28 August) ===
Northamptonshire (4pts) beat Nottinghamshire (0pts) by four wickets

Despite Northamptonshire Steelbacks conceding 28 extras, Johann Louw the main culprit by bowling six wides, they still managed to bowl their opponents Nottinghamshire Outlaws out for 207 at The County Ground, Northampton. Louw made up for his inaccurate line by taking three wickets, including top scorer Chris Read, while Australian Damien Wright grabbed five wickets for 37 runs. That was Wright's first National League five-for of the season, and he brought his seasonal wicket-tally to 23, the most in the division at the time. When Nottinghamshire were in the field, part-time leg spinner Younis Khan took three wickets, but it did not help, as Ben Phillips and Riki Wessels took Northamptonshire home with four wickets and five balls to spare, building on the efforts of Australian Martin Love who had made 59 from number one. (Cricinfo scorecard)

=== Glamorgan v Nottinghamshire (30 August-2 September) ===
Nottinghamshire (19pts) beat Glamorgan (3pts) by eight wickets

Glamorgan were firmly sent back to earth after recording their first Championship win of the season the previous week, as it only took Nottinghamshire's bowlers 48 overs to wrap up their first innings after Glamorgan won the toss and batted. Glamorgan's number five Michael Powell made 62 as the only Glamorgan batsman to pass 25, but left-armer Greg Smith got him and three others out to finish with four for 28 off 17 overs. Glamorgan's final total was only 151, and Nottinghamshire matched that for the loss of only two wickets at the close of the first day, despite losing opener Jason Gallian for a duck. On the second, only 33 overs of play were possible, but Nottinghamshire still marched on to 231 for 2 before Darren Bicknell's dismissal for 123 precipitated a collapse. The last eight wickets fell for 52 runs, as Robert Croft took three wickets and Dean Cosker four either side of stumps on the second day.

Nottinghamshire defended a 132-run lead on first innings, and their bowlers made early inroads, however, as Glamorgan crashed to 94 for 5 with Powell and Alex Wharf at the crease. The pair fought back, adding 118 in just under three hours, as Glamorgan at least gave Nottinghamshire something to chase. Four wickets from Mark Ealham in the late hours of the third day's play, though, reduced Glamorgan to 290 for 9 at the close, and Wharf added 17 on the fourth morning with Huw Waters (who recorded an unbeaten 24-ball duck) before he was dismissed by Andrew Harris for 113, his highest first class score. Despite Wharf's century, Nottinghamshire were set a relatively low target of 176, and fifties from Jason Gallian and Russell Warren carried Nottinghamshire past the target and onto the top of the Championship table with eight wickets in hand. (Cricinfo scorecard)

=== Nottinghamshire v Gloucestershire (5–6 September) ===
Nottinghamshire (20pts) beat Gloucestershire (1.5pts) by an innings and 64 runs

Ten wickets fell on the first day at Trent Bridge, and twenty on the second, as Nottinghamshire recorded a victory to extend their hold on Division One of the County Championship. Batting first, they lost openers Jason Gallian and Darren Bicknell early on to be 16 for 2, and after a 27-run third-wicket stand Steve Kirby trapped Younis Khan lbw for 12. However, Russell Warren and David Hussey rebuilt, and Hussey went on to smash a four-and-a-half-hour 157, his third Championship century of the season, as Nottinghamshire made a total of 336. The first day's play ended when the last Nottinghamshire wicket fell, after 82.4 overs, and Gloucestershire were then penalised 1.5 points for their slow over rate.

Gloucestershire's batting, however, gave below-average scores. Their first innings lasted for 35 overs, Mark Ealham taking five for 31 as the visitors were asked to follow on. Kadeer Ali carried his bat and made 55 not out in their all out total of 103. Batting again, they crashed to 98 for 8, Ealham again taking four wickets, before Jon Lewis cut loose. Gloucestershire required 135 runs to make Nottinghamshire bat again, and Lewis decided that the best way of making that was to smash the ball about. He hit eight fours and three sixes for a 27-ball 55, before the cameo was ended by Hussey holding a catch off his bat. The quickfire innings lifted Gloucestershire to 169 - still 64 short of making Nottinghamshire bat again. (Cricinfo scorecard)

=== Nottinghamshire v Gloucestershire (9 September) ===
Nottinghamshire (4pts) beat Gloucestershire (0pts) by one wicket

The relegation battle in the National League tightened further, as the match at Trent Bridge became a low-scoring thriller, where Gloucestershire Gladiators failed to put away two good positions - first they collapsed from 75 for 2 to make 116, then they allowed Nottinghamshire to hit 19 for the last wicket. They were put in to bat by Nottinghamshire Outlaws and after losing Kadeer Ali and Ramnaresh Sarwan for ducks, Steve Adshead and Craig Spearman rebuilt with a 60-run third-wicket stand. Mark Ealham and Gareth Clough shared the last seven wickets, however, after Ryan Sidebottom had bowled Spearman for 18, and Gloucestershire were all out for 116. James Averis then took four wickets for the Gladiators, as Nottinghamshire lost their first five wickets for 32 runs, but Anurag Singh and Mark Ealham put them back on track by adding 30 for the sixth wicket. Jon Lewis broke through their defences, however, shattering Ealham's stumps as he was bowled, and when Anurag Singh departed for 41, Nottinghamshire's task looked steep. They needed 19 for the last wicket with Ryan Sidebottom and Greg Smith batting - but Smith hit two fours as he ended with 16 not out to take Nottinghamshire to the victory. (Cricinfo scorecard)

=== Nottinghamshire v Worcestershire (11 September) ===
Nottinghamshire (4pts) beat Worcestershire (0pts) by five wickets

Despite little help from the rest of the batting line-up, Ben Smith with 58 and Steven Davies and 43 gave Worcestershire Royals a total of 200, after Nottinghamshire Outlaws' Ryan Sidebottom had bowled four maiden overs and limited the scoring. Worcestershire made it to 200 for 9, however, but with Stephen Fleming making 73 in his first match for Nottinghamshire following the tour of Zimbabwe with the New Zealand team, Nottinghamshire made it to the target with five wickets in hand, despite Kabir Ali and Ray Price taking two wickets each. (Cricinfo scorecard)

=== Kent v Nottinghamshire (14–17 September) ===
Nottinghamshire (20pts) beat Kent (3pts) by 214 runs

Nottinghamshire won the County Championship title with a victory over Kent, thanks to an overnight declaration from their opponents, two big innings from Jason Gallian and a second-innings six-wicket-haul from Andrew Harris. Nottinghamshire knew that 12 points, i.e. a draw and the maximum number of bonus points, would secure the title, and their batting set about making 400 with ease. Darren Bicknell and Gallian opened the batting for the visitors, and they were together for nearly three hours, sharing an opening stand of 157. Simon Cook finally broke through the defences, and two quick wickets from Dane Amjad Khan contributed as Nottinghamshire were set back to 194 for 4. However, the former England wicket-keeper Chris Read made 75, while Gallian moved to 191 not out, as Nottinghamshire amassed 397 for 5 on the first day.

The second day's play was interrupted by rain, but Kent did manage to take the wicket of Gallian - he was run out for 199, his second score of 199 this season. However, 72 from Mark Ealham put the visitors firmly in control, and they declared on 486 for 8. David Fulton and Rob Key fought back for Kent, adding 66 for the first wicket, but a burst of wickets from Graeme Swann and Mark Ealham changed the picture somewhat, as Kent lost four wickets for 19 runs and were 108 for 5. Youngsters Neil Dexter and Niall O'Brien kept their cool, however, sharing a 129-run stand for the sixth wicket as they both notched up half-centuries. Kent declared overnight, and got immediate rewards when Dexter dismissed David Hussey for a golden duck, but the next 24 overs saw runs hit at a rapid rate. Gallian made 74 not out, sharing a 116-run stand with Chris Read, and Nottinghamshire raced to 170 for 3 before declaring. Set 420 to win in about five hours, Kent surrendered to Andrew Harris, who got six wickets for 76. South African Martin van Jaarsveld made 64 for Kent, but he and O'Brien were the only two to bat for more than half an hour, and in the end Nottinghamshire earned the victory and their first County Championship title since 1989 (Cricinfo scorecard)

=== Hampshire v Nottinghamshire (21–23 September) ===
Hampshire (22pts) beat Nottinghamshire (2pts) by an innings and 188 runs

Hampshire were put in to bat by Nottinghamshire, who had won the Championship four days earlier. However, Hampshire's batsmen all put in above 50 scores after Sean Ervine was bowled for 9, James Adams, John Crawley, Simon Katich and Nic Pothas all exceeded 50, and Crawley went on to make 150 not out at the end of the first day - his highest score of the season. Boosted by 75 extras - 38 coming in no-balls, of which 18 were conceded by Mark Footitt alone - Hampshire ended their innings voluntarily on 714 for 5 - a team record - having hit 290 runs for one wicket in 42.3 second-day overs. Captain Shane Warne declared when Mascarenhas got his century, only to later discover that Crawley - who had gone from 200 to 300 with 58 balls - had been denied of the Hampshire highest innings score by five runs, despite a career-best 311 not out . Dick Moore's record from 1937 thus remained. When Hampshire bowled, spinner Shaun Udal celebrated his England call-up with four wickets for 39 runs, while Mascarenhas continued with his all-round effort, taking his second five-wicket-haul of the season as Nottinghamshire were bowled out for 213 shortly before the close on day two. Warne chose to bowl eight balls, conceding six runs. Stephen Fleming top scored for the visitors with 42, as they were asked to follow on - 501 runs behind Hampshire.

Nottinghamshire needed 269 to avoid suffering the highest defeat of the Championship season, and amid the rain breaks at the Rose Bowl, they passed that score with one wicket in hand, thanks to 97 from Darren Bicknell and a 49-ball cameo from Chris Read which yielded 63 runs. Captain Stephen Fleming lasted four minutes at the crease, hitting three fours, a single and a dot ball before he was caught by Andre Adams off Udal. Udal took another four-wicket-haul, but conceded 70 in 11.5 overs, and even Warne was expensive, conceding 67 in thirteen overs. Nottinghamshire were eventually bowled out for 313, but Hampshire finished 2.5 points behind Nottinghamshire in the Championship - despite the same win–loss record and two victories in their head-to-head matches. (Cricinfo scorecard)

=== Hampshire v Nottinghamshire (25 September) ===
Nottinghamshire (4pts) beat Hampshire (0pts) by 37 runs on the Duckworth-Lewis method

Hampshire Hawks were defeated by Nottinghamshire, in particular David Hussey and Ryan Sidebottom, to go down into Division Two in front of their home crowd. The visiting Nottinghamshire Outlaws batted first, and after a slow start where Anurag Singh and Stephen Fleming had accumulated forties to see them to 101 for 3, Hussey hit loose. He hit five sixes in a 53-ball 75 which, together with 26 off 13 balls from Mark Ealham, took Nottinghamshire to 248 for 5. Then rain intervened, cutting 25 overs off the Hampshire effort. When they came back to bat, Hampshire were set 165 to win - and duly lost six wickets for 58 runs, Gareth Clough having two men bowled and captain Shane Warne lbw. Jono McLean hit 36 from number eight, but Hampshire were still taken out for 127 a ball before the end - Ryan Sidebottom finishing them off by having Billy Taylor caught for 0. Sidebottom thus finished with three for 13 from 23 balls. (Cricinfo scorecard)
