= Kent County Cricket Club in 2005 =

Cricket season

Kent County Cricket Club
2005 season
- Coach: (South Africa) Graham Ford
- Captain: (England) David Fulton
- Overseas players: (South Africa) Andrew Hall (South Africa) Justin Kemp
- County Championship: Division One, 5th
- C & G Trophy: Quarter-final
- totesport League: Division Two, 8th
- Twenty20 Cup: Group stage
- Most runs: Rob Key (1,556)
- Most wickets: Min Patel (59)
- Most catches: Martin van Jaarsveld (18)
- Most wicket-keeping dismissals: Niall O'Brien (51)

Kent County Cricket Club in 2005 played their cricket in Division One of the County Championship and Division Two of the totesport League. They started the Championship at 11–2 to win it, behind Surrey and Warwickshire. Their first first-class game, however, was against the students of Cardiff UCCE. They fell to 104 for 6 before rain prevented any further play. They had little luck in their first Sunday League game, against Derbyshire, which was also abandoned through rain.

The match against Warwickshire at Canterbury was a close one. However, depressingly for Kent they could not finish the match off, and Warwickshire survived for the draw, 9 wickets down. Kent then went on to win their Sunday League game against Leicestershire narrowly on the Duckworth-Lewis method. They then drew with Gloucestershire in the County Championship, before losing to the Warwickshire Bears on the Sunday.

Kent came close to humiliation in the first round of the C&G Trophy, when they were bowled out for 160, though eventually they came home, dismissing Wiltshire for 151. Kent then made their highest-ever fourth innings total (447 for 9) as they held on for a draw against Hampshire, before taking advantage of an easy draw in the C&G Trophy, beating Derbyshire by 127 runs to go through to the quarter-finals. There then came a victory over Nottinghamshire and a close draw against Surrey in the Championship, which left them fourth at the end of May. They then beat Gloucestershire in a 3-day match at Maidstone, which also got them an eight-point deduction for a poor pitch. However, in the next match it seemed anything but poor, as Derbyshire racked up 304 for 3 to win by 90 runs.

In June they beat Glamorgan easily in three days, before taking a solid National League victory at Taunton against Somerset, and going top of the table in the Championship after an innings victory over Warwickshire. The Twenty20 Cup kicked off the following week, and Kent almost set a record for poor performance – they lost six successive matches, before rain let them off with a no-result against Sussex and a win over Essex, which did nothing apart from permanently damage the Essex lads' chances.

Following the Twenty20 Cup, Kent still had not shook their losing habit, although losing the toss against Sussex probably had something to do with their 66-run loss – they were forced to bat in poorer conditions. A loss in the C&G Trophy quarter-finals followed, not all that surprising given Kent's one-day form, and that meant Kent's only realistic chances of winning anything this season were in the County Championship, and after giving up 457 runs in the first innings against Surrey that looked difficult. However, they chased 232 in 35 evening overs to take 21 points and retain the lead in the Championship. In a National League match shortened to 16 overs due to rain, Kent lost to Somerset by eight wickets, and they also lost to Warwickshire in a midweek match in the National League, but beat Yorkshire in their last match of July, also a one-day game.

The first match of August was an expected win over Glamorgan, by an innings and 124 runs, but their one-day promotion hopes were dented as they lost to Surrey. A drawn match with Hampshire followed, after two successive Championship victories, which meant that the title battle in Division One still was exciting. Bangladesh A were then defeated inside two days, but the margin of victory was only three wickets. Kent then got a National League no-result against Surrey, and rain continued to blight them as their match with Middlesex ended in a draw. They repaired their poor National League season somewhat, beating Yorkshire Phoenix and Scottish Saltires, but on the first Sunday of September they fell to 140 and lost by eight wickets to Durham Dynamos. With only nine points from their second Championship draw with Middlesex in three weeks, Kent trailed league leaders Nottinghamshire by 19.5 points before their match on 14 September. Needing a win to have any chance of Championship glory, they declared their way out of the match, and lost by 204 runs. They also lost their final three games – a home one-day game with Sussex, a Championship game at Sussex, and a League game with Leicestershire.

== Squad ==
- Ages given as of the first day of the County Championship season, 13 April 2005.

| Name | Nationality | Birth date | Batting style | Bowling style | Notes |
Batsmen
| Michael Carberry | England | 29 September 1980 (aged 24) | Left-handed | Right arm off break | |
| Joe Denly | England | 16 March 1986 (aged 19) | Right-handed | Right arm leg break | |
| David Fulton | England | 15 November 1971 (aged 33) | Right-handed | Slow left arm orthodox | Club captain |
| Kevin Jones | England | 9 September 1986 (aged 18) | Right-handed | Right arm medium | |
| Rob Key | England | 12 May 1979 (aged 25) | Right-handed | Right arm off break | |
| Martin van Jaarsveld | South Africa | 18 June 1974 (aged 30) | Right-handed | Right arm medium / Right arm off break | Kolpak player |
| Matt Walker | England | 2 January 1974 (aged 31) | Left-handed | Right arm medium | |
All-rounders
| Matthew Dennington | South Africa | 16 October 1982 (aged 22) | Right-handed | Right arm fast-medium | European passport |
| Andrew Hall | South Africa | 31 July 1975 (aged 29) | Right-handed | Right arm fast-medium | Overseas player |
| Justin Kemp | South Africa | 31 July 1975 (aged 29) | Right-handed | Right arm fast-medium | Overseas player |
| Darren Stevens | England | 30 April 1976 (aged 28) | Right-handed | Right arm medium | |
Wicket-keepers
| Paul Dixey | England | 2 November 1987 (aged 17) | Right-handed | — | |
| Geraint Jones | England | 14 July 1979 (aged 25) | Right-handed | — | |
| Niall O'Brien | Ireland | 8 November 1981 (aged 23) | Left-handed | — | |
Bowlers
| Simon Cook | England | 15 January 1977 (aged 28) | Right-handed | Right arm medium-fast | |
| Simon Cusden | England | 21 February 1985 (aged 20) | Right-handed | Right arm fast-medium | |
| Rob Ferley | England | 4 February 1982 (aged 23) | Right-handed | Slow left arm orthodox | |
| Robbie Joseph | England | 20 January 1982 (aged 23) | Right-handed | Right arm fast | |
| Amjad Khan | Denmark | 14 October 1980 (aged 24) | Right-handed | Right arm fast-medium | |
| Min Patel | England | 7 July 1970 (aged 34) | Right-handed | Slow left arm orthodox | |
| Martin Saggers | England | 23 May 1972 (aged 32) | Right-handed | Right arm fast-medium | |
| David Stiff | England | 20 October 1984 (aged 20) | Right-handed | Right arm fast | |
| James Tredwell | England | 27 February 1982 (aged 23) | Left-handed | Right arm off break | |

== Tables ==
=== Championship ===
2005 County Championship – Division One
| Pos | Team | Pld | W | D | L | Pen | BP | Pts |
|---|---|---|---|---|---|---|---|---|
| 1 | Nottinghamshire | 16 | 9 | 4 | 3 | 0 | 94 | 236 |
| 2 | Hampshire | 16 | 9 | 4 | 3 | 0.5 | 92 | 233.5 |
| 3 | Sussex | 16 | 7 | 6 | 3 | 0 | 102 | 224 |
| 4 | Warwickshire | 16 | 8 | 3 | 5 | 0.5 | 86 | 209.5 |
| 5 | Kent | 16 | 6 | 7 | 3 | 8.5 | 99 | 202.5 |
| 6 | Middlesex | 16 | 4 | 7 | 5 | 0.5 | 98 | 181.5 |
| 7 | Surrey | 16 | 4 | 9 | 3 | 8.5 | 97 | 180.5 |
| 8 | Gloucestershire | 16 | 1 | 5 | 10 | 2 | 72 | 104 |
| 9 | Glamorgan | 16 | 1 | 1 | 14 | 0 | 71 | 88.5 |

=== totesport League ===
2005 totesport League – Division Two
| Pos | Team | Pld | W | L | NR | T | Pts |
|---|---|---|---|---|---|---|---|
| 1 | Sussex Sharks | 18 | 13 | 4 | 1 | 0 | 54 |
| 2 | Durham Dynamos | 18 | 12 | 4 | 2 | 0 | 52 |
| 3 | Warwickshire Bears | 18 | 10 | 6 | 2 | 0 | 44 |
| 4 | Leicestershire Foxes | 18 | 10 | 7 | 1 | 0 | 42 |
| 5 | Derbyshire Phantoms | 18 | 9 | 7 | 1 | 1 | 40 |
| 6 | Somerset Sabres | 18 | 9 | 8 | 1 | 0 | 38 |
| 7 | Surrey Lions | 18 | 7 | 10 | 1 | 0 | 30 |
| 8 | Kent Spitfires | 18 | 6 | 10 | 2 | 0 | 28 |
| 9 | Yorkshire Phoenix | 18 | 5 | 13 | 0 | 0 | 20 |
| 10 | Scottish Saltires | 18 | 2 | 14 | 1 | 1 | 12 |

== Match details ==
=== Kent v Cardiff UCCE (13–15 April) ===
Match drawn

Kent had a tough rain-affected first day at the St Lawrence Ground, Canterbury. They struggled against the bowling of Dai Rushbrook, who took 3 for 25 in 8 overs, and Luke Sellers, who took 2 for 23 in 7. At one point they were reduced to 86 for 6, before recovering to 104 for 6 in the 30 overs the weather allowed them before close of play on the first day. The next two days of this three day match were then both abandoned because of rain. (Cricinfo scorecard)

=== Derbyshire v Kent (17 April) ===
Match abandoned – Derbyshire (2pts), Kent (2pts)

Derbyshire, playing for the first time as the "Phantoms" lost the toss and were put in to bat at Derby. Opener Jonathan Moss made free at the start of the innings with 79 off 81 balls before he was bowled by Rob Ferley. His team-mates struggled, with only captain Luke Sutton, with 46, adding much to the score. Derbyshire scored 197 for 8 in their 45 overs. Only 5 overs of Kent Spitfires' innings were possible, in which time they made 9 for no loss. Rain then meant the match was abandoned. (BBC scorecard)

=== Kent v Warwickshire (20–23 April) ===
Kent (10pts) drew with Warwickshire (10pts)

The first day at the St Lawrence Ground saw Warwickshire and England left arm spin bowler Ashley Giles take 5 for 86, and Martin van Jaarsveld 118 as Kent finished on 342 for 9. At the end of a second day, Kent took their score to 347. Nick Knight, who scored 100, and Ian Bell, with 63, got Warwickshire off to a good start. But from 179 for 1, Min Patel and Amjad Khan bowled Kent into the match. Warwickshire finished the day on 288 for 7 off 100 overs.

On the third day, Warwickshire were soon finished off for 309, 38 behind Kent. The Dane Khan did the brunt of the damage, finishing with on 6 for 73. Then van Jaarsveld and David Fulton played with great determination and put together their second century stand of the game with 155. At close, Kent were 308 for 6, 346 ahead, and they declared overnight.

On a fourth-day pitch favouring the spinners, Warwickshire found themselves in deep trouble on 73 for 5. If Kent were to finish champions, they really should have won from that position, but Tony Frost and Alex Loudon had different ideas when they batted throughout the whole afternoon session. After tea, Patel took three quick wickets, and Kent again looked on course for the win. But Frost, who scored 82, survived throughout the entire evening session, and after the ninth wicket fell, last man Nick Warren survived for 15 balls to earn Warwickshire the draw. They were 233 for 9 at stumps. (BBC scorecard)

=== Kent v Leicestershire (24 April) ===
Kent (4pts) beat Leicestershire (0pts) by 6 runs (D/L method)

At Canterbury, Leicestershire Foxes scored 214 from their 45 overs, with Dinesh Mongia contributing 62. Martin Saggers, who is not yet fully fit, took 3 for 46 for the Kent Spitfires. In reply, England openers Rob Key and Geraint Jones both failed, before South Africa's Martin van Jaarsveld continued his great start to the season with an unbeaten 69. Kent were 150 for 4 after 33.5 overs when rain and bad light brought an end to a closely fought game, which Kent took after being ahead according to the Duckworth-Lewis method. (Cricinfo scorecard)

=== Gloucestershire v Kent (27–30 April) ===
Gloucestershire (8pts) drew with Kent (11pts)

Play started at 4.30pm on the first day at Bristol. Kent progressed to 66 for 2 at close, with Rob Key (26) and Matthew Walker (22) the not out batsmen. On the second day, Key and Walker proceeded to their centuries. Key top-scored with 164, an innings which gave him a good shout for the No.3 spot in the England national team. When Walker was third man out with the score on 260, it precipitated a minor collapse, and Kent finished the second day on 339 for 6.

On the third day Kent lost their last four wickets in 40 minutes, finishing on 359. Gloucestershire, however, lost wickets steadily, and would have lost more had Kent not dropped four chances. Chris Taylor, the Gloucester captain, was the mainstay of the innings with a painstaking 66 from 173 balls. They finished the day on 208 for 7, 2 away from saving the follow-on, and most probably the match as well.

Gloucestershire added 40 runs on the last day, and then Kent batted out the day for a draw, finishing on 229 for 5 declared. Walker and Stevens had time to score half-centuries, and Geraint Jones had some useful batting practice in getting to 36 not out, but there was never much prospect of a result once the follow-on was saved. Kent captain David Fulton said, "If there had been any realistic chance of a result we would have been happy to go for it. But the pitch has just got flatter, and it was obvious we couldn't really hope to bowl them out quickly." (BBC scorecard)

=== Warwickshire v Kent (1 May) ===
Warwickshire (4pts) beat Kent (0pts) by 19 runs

Nick Knight scored 122 off 125, the highest score of the National League season thus far, to boot the Bears up to 279 for 7 off their 45 overs. A spirited fightback from the Spitfires saw them hang in until the 44th over, but eventually, despite 82 from Martin van Jaarsveld and a 40-run last wicket stand between Simon Cook and Martin Saggers, they perished for 260 all out with 11 balls to go. (BBC scorecard)

=== Wiltshire v Kent (3 May) ===
Kent beat Wiltshire by 9 runs to progress to Round Two of the C&G Trophy

Kent came close to being humiliated by the minor county Wiltshire at Salisbury as they were bowled out for 160, with Kevin Nash taking 4 for 46. In reply, Wiltshire were always in with a chance, but lost wickets regularly, with Simon Cook taking 4 for 22. However, with 10 runs needed off the last over, Nash was run out to seal a Kent win. (BBC scorecard)

=== Scotland v Kent (8 May) ===
Kent (4pts) beat Scotland (0pts) by 93 runs (Duckworth–Lewis method)

Kent Spitfires demolished the Scottish Saltires at their home ground in a rain-haunted match. Winning the toss and bowling, Scotland did not quite get the wickets they wanted, the South African Martin van Jaarsveld top-scoring for Kent with 57 while Darren Stevens smashed 51 off 30 balls towards the end. Scotland's innings was frequently interrupted by rain and Darren Stevens' bowling – he took five for 32, his first career five-for, as Scotland crawled to 134 all out in 32.2 overs – 94 short of the adjusted target, coincidentally exactly the same as Kent had made, but shortened by seven overs. (Cricinfo scorecard)

=== Kent v Hampshire (11–14 May) ===
Kent (10pts) drew with Hampshire (10pts)

Hampshire put on 328 in only 73.3 overs on the first day at Canterbury, helped greatly by a maiden 72-ball first-class century by Shane Warne, who came in with the score on 130 for 7. First class debutant wicket-keeper Tim Burrows scored 42, sharing a 131-run stand with Warne. In reply, Kent were 135 for 3 at stumps, with David Fulton scoring a half-century.

On the second day, Kent were all out for 305, Hampshire making 191 for 2 in reply, putting them firmly in the box seat. The day's honours went to Simon Katich, who was on 125 at close, and with Kevin Pietersen also scoring a century on day three, Hampshire were able to declare on 461 for 9, setting a mammoth target of 485. Kent were 121 for 2 in reply when time was called.

The fourth and final day saw Kent pull off a draw after they attempted to win. When the eighth wicket fell at 370, the tailenders looked for the draw, which they achieved as Kent reached their highest-ever fourth innings total of 447 for 9. Kent's innings featured 77 from Martin van Jaarsveld as six other batsmen scored more than 35. (Cricinfo scorecard)

=== Derbyshire v Kent (17 May) ===
Kent beat Derbyshire by 127 runs to progress to the Quarter-Finals of the C&G Trophy

At Derby, Derbyshire won the toss and chose to field against Kent, who scored 257 for 4 after healthy contributions from the entire top order, Geraint Jones top-scoring with 70 while Derbyshire's South African all-rounder Ant Botha took three for 40 with his left-arm spin. Martin Saggers (three for 21), Amjad Khan (one for 12) and Simon Cook (one for 22) then reduced Derbyshire to 27 for 5, and Derbyshire were never in the match from there. Eventually they were bowled out for 130 in 42.5 overs. (Cricinfo scorecard)

=== Nottinghamshire v Kent (20–23 May) ===
Kent (20pts) beat Nottinghamshire (3pts) by 196 runs

Trent Bridge was lucky to escape most of the rain that ravaged the sixth round of the Championship, as over 100 overs was possible on the first day in which Kent could rack up 301 runs in their first innings, after being put in to bat by Nottinghamshire's captain Stephen Fleming. Kent's David Fulton and Rob Key paired up to score 81 for the first wicket, but former Yorkshire bowler Ryan Sidebottom came back to remove the three top order batsmen. Sidebottom finished with his five for 61, while the Irish wicket-keeper Niall O'Brien top-scored with 64 on season debut for Kent, taking over from Geraint Jones who had been called up to play Tests for England.

In reply, Nottinghamshire collapsed uncharacteristically, with Simon Cook taking four for 38 as only opener Darren Bicknell passed 25 in Nottinghamshire's innings. At stumps on day 2, Nottinghamshire were 169 for 9, just ahead of the follow-on target, and the last pair added a further 15 early on. Kent scored runs briskly, and despite both their South Africans – Martin van Jaarsveld and Andrew Hall – getting ducks, they racked up 298 for 8 in 72 overs – helped by the 32 extras. Nottinghamshire, chasing a massive 416 to win, imploded, Danish bowler Amjad Khan taking the wickets of David Hussey and Chris Read in quick succession to, with the help of Min Patel, reduce the hosts from 114 for 3 to 116 for 6. Even a last-wicket stand of 73 between Sidebottom (31) and 20-year-old Oliver Newby (38 not out) did not help, as Patel eventually had Sidebottom stumped. Hall got the best bowling figures for Kent in the second innings, recording four for 42 including both Nottinghamshire openers. (Cricinfo scorecard)

=== Kent v Surrey (25–28 May) ===
Surrey (10pts) drew with Kent (9pts)

Kent had to settle for a draw in a see-sawing match against Surrey at Tunbridge Wells, looking to control the game with skipper David Fulton and Rob Key in. However, Martin Bicknell sparked a mini-collapse, removing four wickets in a short space of time to give Surrey a chance and finishing with four for 31 from 24 overs. However, after going from 112 for 0 to 129 for 5, Key and Andrew Hall built a partnership of 100 for the sixth wicket to save Kent's blushes. The Kent innings was finished off by slow left-armer Nayan Doshi who took three for 58 as Kent crumbled to 262 all out.

Min Patel then took timely wickets to reduce Surrey to 67 for 3, but Rikki Clarke and Jonathan Batty rescued Surrey with a fourth-wicket partnership of 99. Ali Brown then continued the good work with 56, allowing Clarke to reach his century and give Surrey the lead. However, Patel continued to chip away and ended with six for 124 off 38 overs, and Surrey were bowled out for 324, leading by 62 in what shaped up to be a close match. Before stumps, Kent lost the wicket of David Fulton for 18, but still made 37 for 1. With Key and van Jaarsveld finally playing up to their potential, Key scoring 189 and van Jaarsveld 168, the Surrey bowlers were shown to be rather inadequate as Kent racked up 467 for 4 declared to set Surrey a massive 406 to win in a day.

They never really tried, opting to defend and take the four points available for a draw instead, as their run rate was about one and a half an over before lunch. Despite that, they got to 280 for 0, before the dominant batsman of Surrey's innings – Scott Newman, who made 167 with 16 fours and three sixes – was out to Martin Saggers, who bowled only eight overs. Despite a minor collapse, losing four wickets for 56 runs, Surrey hung on for the draw – as both teams lost further ground to Nottinghamshire, Hampshire and Warwickshire. During this match it was announced that Surrey would lose 8 points for ball-tampering in their game against Nottinghamshire. (BBC scorecard)

=== Kent v Durham (29 May) ===
Durham (4pts) beat Kent (0pts) by 1 run

Durham Dynamos extended their unbeaten run in National League games to six games as they pulled off a remarkable comeback at Kent Spitfires. Having won the toss and batted, Durham made 189 after having been pegged back by South African Andrew Hall who took 3 for 17 off 8.5 overs. In reply, Hall made 72 as Kent cruised to 128 for 2 and 170 for 3, but Durham's players fought back. With the main damage coming from their internationals Ashley Noffke (three for 33) and Nathan Astle (two for 21), Kent lost six wickets for 17 runs, and Kent were tied down to such an extent that they needed three runs off the last ball to win – Martin Saggers could only scrape the one bye. (Cricinfo scorecard)

=== Kent v Gloucestershire (1–3 June) ===
Kent (18pts) beat Gloucestershire (3pts) by 7 wickets
Kent deducted 8pts because of the poor quality of the pitch

Kent had cause to regret playing this match at their Mote Park outground in Maidstone even though they secured a comfortable victory against Gloucestershire, as they ended up being fined 8pts for the poor quality of the pitch. Gloucestershire could only manage 183 in their first innings, and only 98 in their second, while Irish wicket-keeper Niall O'Brien held nine catches. Kent's bowlers all contributed, as Simon Cook, Andrew Hall and Amjad Khan took five wickets each. Kent made 204 in their first innings despite Mark Hardinges 5 for 51, and lost only 3 wickets in reaching their second-innings target of 78. No batsman made 40 in the entire match, and despite some overs on the first day being lost to rain, the game was over in 3 days. (Cricinfo scorecard)

=== Kent v Derbyshire (5 June) ===
Derbyshire (4pts) beat Kent (0pts) by 90 runs

Derbyshire Phantoms travelled to Maidstone to play Kent Spitfires with only one win in their first four games. However, the way in which they won this one was emphatic. Kent captain David Fulton won the toss and chose to field, and Australian Michael di Venuto ridiculed his choice with an 80-ball century with twelve fours and a six. In the end, he was out for 116 off 90 balls, but when everyone else hit at nearly a run a ball and Kent could only take three wickets, Derbyshire amassed 304 for 3. Kent gave it their best shot in the chase, Andrew Hall making 61 from the top of the order, but despite late order smashing from Justin Kemp (27) and Amjad Khan (33), Kent ended all out for 214, 91 runs short with 38 balls remaining. (Cricinfo scorecard)

=== Glamorgan v Kent (8–10 June) ===
Kent (21.5pts) beat Glamorgan (6pts) by 10 wickets

Glamorgan went down to another heavy defeat at Sophia Gardens in Cardiff. After winning the toss and losing two wickets for 16, Kent fought back to make a mammoth 568, thanks mainly to 262 not out from Martin van Jaarsveld – the highest score of the English county season so far – with Darren Stevens (80) and Min Patel (87) offering valuable support. Although Glamorgan did not collapse, it was clear they were not going to threaten their visitors' score. A number of batsmen got in with David Hemp and Sourav Ganguly both making 69, but the innings ended on 358. The follow-on was enforced, and Glamorgan went into freefall when they had to bat again. Amjad Khan ripped out three early wickets – for which Glamorgan only scampered five runs, and Kent took the next two wickets for 29 runs, leaving the Welsh team precariously placed at 34 for 5, before Ganguly saved the innings with a thumping three-hour 142. The late rally, however, was only enough to force Kent to make 51 runs in their second innings, which they achieved without loss of a wicket to win inside three days. Kent were deducted half a point for a slow over rate. (Cricinfo scorecard)

=== Somerset v Kent (12 June) ===
Kent (4pts) beat Somerset (0pts) by 74 runs

Martin van Jaarsveld continued his stunning form for the Spitfires with 114 against Somerset Sabres which lifted the visitors to a massive 319 for 5, as the bowlers were smashed to all corners of the Recreation Ground in Bath. In reply, Ian Blackwell smashed 57 off 42 balls, but it was never enough as Somerset were all out in 37.3 overs – with 45 balls potentially remaining of their innings – for 245. (Cricinfo scorecard)

=== Warwickshire v Kent (15–18 June) ===
Kent (22pts) beat Warwickshire (3pts) by an innings and 164 runs

Warwickshire felt the loss of seamer Heath Streak to injury as they went down by a massive margin to a strong Kent team at Maidstone. Batting first, Warwickshire were 116 for 8 when Tony Frost departed for 23, Simon Cook and Amjad Khan having taken three wickets each. However, a ninth-wicket partnership of 97 between Streak and Neil Carter, along with a level-headed stand from the number 11 Nick Warren lifted Warwickshire to 252. As it turned out, it was nowhere near enough. Streak limped off in his fifth over with a groin injury, leaving all-rounder Alex Loudon and Carter to do the brunt of the bowling, and they were woefully ineffective against Kent's batting line-up. Matthew Walker and Darren Stevens both made centuries for Kent, Martin van Jaarsveld chipped in with 62, while Loudon was Warwickshire's best bowler with three for 130, Kent amassed 569 – a lead of 317 runs. In the twenty overs remaining on the third day, Andrew Hall dug out two wickets for Kent, including England Test batsman Ian Bell for a duck. On a fourth-day pitch which turned plenty, Min Patel could take six for 53, as Warwickshire crumbled in a woeful heap for 153. (Cricinfo scorecard)

=== Kent v Surrey (22 June) ===
Surrey (2pts) beat Kent (0pts) by seven wickets

In front of a full house at Beckenham, Mohammad Akram of the visiting Surrey Lions served up a rare maiden in Twenty20 cricket as Kent Spitfires were tied down to 140 for 8 off their twenty overs, despite Martin van Jaarsveld scoring a fifty. James Benning then made batting easy for Surrey, scoring ten fours and two sixes in a crackling 66. Surrey eventually won comparatively easily, having four overs left when they reached 141 for 3. (Cricinfo scorecard)

=== Essex v Kent (24 June) ===
Essex (2pts) beat Kent (0pts) by 29 runs

The match at Chelmsford was made into even more of a slog-effort by the English rain, as both teams were limited to 12 overs. Andy Flower made 46 off 29 balls, and 17 extras made the Essex Eagles run-rate exactly eleven an over. Defending 133, Essex got off to a good start as Antonio Palladino took two wickets, which stopped the visitors from massive smashing, and Kent Spitfires finished on 103 for 4 – thirty runs short of their winning target. (Cricinfo scorecard)

=== Kent v Middlesex (25 June) ===
Middlesex (2pts) beat Kent (0pts) by 20 runs

Ed Smith took over the mantle from Owais Shah as Middlesex Crusaders' most useful batsman in the Twenty20 Cup, as he recorded three sixes in a 59-ball 85 and lifted Middlesex to 189 for 8 against Kent Spitfires at Beckenham. In reply, Kent lost wickets regularly, and Justin Kemp – normally a quick scorer – could not find his footing and only made 23 not out off 19 balls, as Kent could only scamper 169 for 5 in their allotted 20 overs, 21 runs short of the target. (Cricinfo scorecard)

=== Hampshire v Kent (27 June) ===
Hampshire (2pts) beat Kent (0pts) by five wickets

Zimbabwean Greg Lamb, playing for the Hampshire Hawks as a home qualified player due to owning an English passport, took four wickets, including three former Test players, for 28 – which helped peg Kent Spitfires back to 154 for 9. Hampshire's reply was very well timed, and even a good bowling spell from Kent's James Tredwell – who only conceded sixteen runs off the bat in four overs – could not stop the Hawks. Lawrence Prittipaul made 35 before being out on the penultimate ball with the scores tied, but off-spinner and stand-in captain Shaun Udal, however, made a single on the last ball, as Hampshire reached 155 for 5 in their 20 overs – Nic Pothas top-scoring with 58. (Cricinfo scorecard)

=== Middlesex v Kent (29 June) ===
Middlesex (2pts) beat Kent (0pts) by six wickets

At Uxbridge, Middlesex Crusaders proved the worth of wicket-taking bowling. Irfan Pathan dug out Matthew Walker with the second ball of the game, and that set the tone of the innings. Left-arm spinner Chris Peploe took three wickets, but conceded 35 runs, yet Kent's final total of 144 for 8 did not look too threatening. Owais Shah kept ploughing on his hard-hitting form, taking James Tredwell to the cleaners in his 59 not out, and Middlesex made it to 145 for 4 with 16 balls remaining in the innings, as none of the opposition bowlers took more than one wicket. (Cricinfo scorecard)

=== Surrey v Kent (1 July) ===
Surrey (2pts) beat Kent (0pts) by 23 runs (D/L method)

Kent Spitfires suffered another loss, this time at the Oval against Surrey Lions. In a rain-hit game shortened by five overs, Surrey scored freely, hitting at nearly 11 runs an over – Ali Brown with 29 and Scott Newman with 52 not out off 27 balls doing the brunt of the damage. Kent made an attempt at chasing 168, with Michael Carberry taking 23 runs off nine balls in his innings from number three, but Surrey spinner Nayan Doshi took four wickets for 27 to set them back to 123 for 6. With economical bowling from Azhar Mahmood as well, Kent only managed 144 for 8. (Cricinfo scorecard)

=== Kent v Sussex (5 July) ===
No result; Kent (1pt), Sussex (1pt)

In eleven overs of play, Kent Spitfires moved to 91 for 1, Andrew Hall making 43 not out as Sussex Sharks' new man, Pakistani Naved-ul-Hasan made his debut with nought for 10 in two overs. Then, rain made play impossible. (Cricinfo scorecard)

=== Kent v Essex (6 July) ===
Kent (2pts) beat Essex (0pts) by five runs

Dane Amjad Khan, who had missed the first part of the 2005 ICC Trophy and most of the Twenty20 Cup due to injury, returned to cricket with a very decent bowling spell of three for 24 to set Essex Eagles back to 26 for 3. Khan's Kent Spitfires had batted first, however, and 59 not out from left-hander Michael Carberry lifted them to a total of 154 for 4, while Andre Adams shone on the bowling front for Essex with two for 12 off three overs. However, the Spitfires kept firing dangerous balls at the Eagles, and eventually shot them down to 149 for 7 – Mark Pettini making 60 in vain before he was run out, while Andrew Hall took two for 30 for Kent. (Cricinfo scorecard)

=== Sussex v Kent (8 July) ===
Sussex (4pts) beat Kent (0pts) by four wickets

Sussex Sharks regained the lead in Division Two of the National League with a win over Kent Spitfires in a low-scoring match at The County Ground, Hove. Sussex' Pakistani cricketers Rana Naved-ul-Hasan and Mushtaq Ahmed took three and two wickets respectively, reducing Kent to 106 for 7, before James Kirtley mopped up the tail with three balls remaining of Kent's innings, for 155. Then, a fiery opening spell from Simon Cook, who had hit an unbeaten 28 with the bat, resulted in three quick wickets (he ended with excellent figures of three for 15 off nine overs) and sent Sussex down to 22 for 4. However, Michael Yardy and Carl Hopkinson paired up for 103 for the fifth wicket, and Yardy's 65 anchored a nervy chase as Sussex reached the target with 3.3 overs remaining. (Cricinfo scorecard)

=== Kent v Sussex (10–13 July) ===
Sussex (21pts) beat Kent (6pts) by 66 runs

Sussex took hand of a see-sawing match at Canterbury, mainly thanks to their Pakistani overseas players Rana Naved-ul-Hasan and Mushtaq Ahmed, who took fourteen wickets between them. The hosts Kent won the toss and put Sussex in to bat, and after an initial opening partnership of 65, two wickets fell quickly. However, opener Ian Ward completed his century, and 63 from Murray Goodwin swung it Sussex's way to 210 for 2 before South African all-rounder Andrew Hall took two quick wickets. Sussex quickly slumped to 298 for 8, but captain Chris Adams stood firm, making 83 as Sussex batted into the second day – making 378 in the end. Curiously, Simon Cook of Kent bowled eleven maidens in 24 overs, but conceded 57 runs in the other 13.

Kent looked to be well on the way to posting a challenging total, as they were on 323 for 6 at stumps on day 2, with four of their batsmen making fifties. However, day three saw a total of twenty wickets tumble. First, Kent lost four wickets to be all out for 348, trailing by 30. Then, after Michael Yardy and Goodwin had rescued to Sussex to 89 for 2 after both openers had been removed for sub-20 scores, Sussex fell apart. Min Patel ran through the middle-order, Amjad Khan took care of the tail, and Sussex were all out for 155, setting a target of 186. However, accurate bowling was enough to undo Kent, as no Kent batsmen passed 35 and Naved-ul-Hasan and Mushtaq Ahmed shared eight wickets – Kent were all out for 119, but retained the County Championship lead, as their closest competitors failed to win. (Cricinfo scorecard)

=== Warwickshire v Kent (15 July) ===
Warwickshire beat Kent by five wickets to progress to the Semi-Finals of the C&G Trophy

Andrew Hall and Rob Key gave Kent some hope of winning the match at Edgbaston with their opening partnership of 120 runs, but spinners Ashley Giles and Alex Loudon broke through twice each to limit the final score to 259 for 6. Warwickshire's reply centred on former England ODI player Nic Knight, who made fourteen fours in his 27th one-day century. Three wickets from Justin Kemp had earlier set Warwickshire back to 118 for 3, but Knight and Trevor Penney who made 50 not out off 43 balls, guided Warwickshire to the target with nearly four overs to spare. (Cricinfo scorecard)

=== Surrey v Kent (20–23 July) ===
Kent (21pts) beat Surrey (7.5pts) by four wickets

At Guildford, Surrey opted to bat first against league-leaders Kent, and despite losing Richard Clinton for a ten-ball duck early on, the first day belonged to Surrey. Three batsmen passed 90 – Graham Thorpe, Mark Ramprakash and Ali Brown, who top-scored with 107 having been 101 not out overnight – as Surrey eased their way to 452 for 8 declared, never really bothered by any of the Kent bowlers. Kent were not daunted by Surrey's high score, however, not even when Rob Key and Darren Stevens departed in quick succession to see Kent to 202 for 4, but Matthew Walker and Justin Kemp added 233 for the fifth wicket, both making centuries. Kemp was eventually bowled by Azhar Mahmood for 124, but Walker went on to make 173 as Kent racked up 572, a lead of 120.

In reply, Richard Clinton and Jonathan Batty put on 107 for the first wicket, as the match headed towards a draw. However, patient work from spinner Min Patel, who was asked to bowl 47 overs, yielded four wickets (all of whom batted from number six and down) for 110 runs, and Patel was supported by two wickets by Andrew Hall to limit Kent's target to 231. After a frantic 34 overs, during which Mohammad Akram no-balled four times in his six overs while taking two for 30, Justin Kemp showed his skill at hitting quick runs as he made 47 not out, with three sixes, off 37 balls. In the end, Kent won with five balls remaining before the umpire would call time, and Surrey were also deducted half a point for a slow over rate. (Cricinfo scorecard)

=== Kent v Somerset (24 July) ===
Somerset (4pts) beat Kent (0pts) by eight wickets

The match between Kent Spitfires and Somerset Sabres at the St Lawrence Ground was shortened to 16 overs owing to bad weather. Kent were sent in to bat, and lost three early wickets, two to Andy Caddick and one to Richard Johnson, for only 11 runs. Rob Key and Justin Kemp both made 17, and James Tredwell smacked two sixes for his nine-ball 22 as Kent came back to 90 for 6, which was still below six runs an over. Tredwell also took two for 19 with his off breaks, but Graeme Smith hit nine fours as he made his way to an unbeaten 56, and James Hildreth won the match for Somerset with a six off Tredwell, with 20 balls potentially remaining in their chase. (Cricinfo scorecard)

=== Kent v Warwickshire (27 July) ===
Warwickshire (4pts) beat Kent (0pts) by three wickets

In a day/night match at the St Lawrence Ground, Warwickshire captain Nick Knight sent Kent in to bat, and his South African pace bowler Dewald Pretorius took a flurry of wickets in good bowling conditions. Ending with five for 32, he took the first five wickets of the innings as Kent collapsed to 29 for 5, but South Africans Justin Kemp and Martin van Jaarsveld rebuilt quickly. Despite little support – no batsman apart from himself passed 25 – Kemp made his way to 84 off 93 balls, as Kent scrambled 177 for 9. In reply, Warwickshire got to 19 for 0, but a fiery spell from Martin Saggers yielded three wickets, as Nick Knight, Ian Bell and Jamie Troughton were all dismissed in single figures. Warwickshire's fifth-wicket partners saw off the opening bowling, however, and went after the part-timers instead, in chase of what suddenly looked like a big target of 178.

Alex Loudon rebuilt well, however, with just 20 of his 73 runs coming in boundaries, while his first partner Jonathan Trott failed to hit any runs and probably did the team a favour when he edged a ball from Robert Joseph – cousin of West Indies batsman Sylvester Joseph – behind, gone for 10 off 40 balls. The wicket looked like it was the first of a collapse, however, as Tony Frost departed shortly afterwards with Warwickshire on 62 for 6. However, Trevor Penney made 42 – including just the one four – in a 77-run partnership with Loudon, and Dougie Brown made an unbeaten 16 at the end to lead Warwickshire home with five balls to spare. (Cricinfo scorecard)

=== Yorkshire v Kent (31 July) ===
Kent (4pts) beat Yorkshire (0pts) by five wickets

In the mid-table battle in Division Two, Yorkshire Phoenix went down despite an unbeaten 116 from England captain Michael Vaughan. Yorkshire were missing Ian Harvey for this game, and it showed, as no other batsman passed 30 and Vaughan was woefully alone in getting the target up. It was eventually set at 217 for Kent Spitfires, and as Matthew Walker found his rhythm to hit seven fours in an unbeaten 56, Kent got to that target with five wickets and four balls to spare, despite Vaughan's off-breaks yielding two wickets for 42 runs. (Cricinfo scorecard)

=== Kent v Glamorgan (3–5 August) ===
Kent (22pts) beat Glamorgan (5pts) by an innings and 124 runs

Kent, as expected, beat Glamorgan, but were worried on occasion. Having been shaken early on as Glamorgan dug out four early wickets, Kent were lifted by a 267-run partnership between Darren Stevens (who made 208) and Andrew Hall (133) which helped them along the way to a final first-innings score of 587, with Min Patel taking 55 balls for a 64 from number nine. Six Glamorgan players were then out in single figures, Amjad Khan taking three for 68, but number three David Hemp stood tall with an unbeaten 171. Glamorgan were 188 for 9 at one point on day two, but survived to stumps to 236 for 9, and just kept going – their number 11, Huw Waters, made 34 from 192 balls, and he added 118 with Hemp, for the second-highest stand of the match.

However, Hemp was worn out after his marathon knock, and was sent in at five as Glamorgan followed on. Glamorgan were bundled out for 157, Hemp only lasting half an hour before he was lbw to Hall, who took four for 32. Justin Kemp and Simon Cook also got two wickets each, while Jonathan Hughes top scored with 27. This was Glamorgan's tenth loss in the County Championship this season. (Cricinfo scorecard)

=== Kent v Surrey (7 August) ===
Surrey (4pts) beat Kent (0pts) by five wickets

Surrey Lions recorded only their fourth win in the National League system this year with a five-wicket win over Kent Spitfires at the St Lawrence Ground. Kent, having chosen to bat first, were dismissed by medium-pacer Neil Saker, who took four for 43, and Tim Murtagh, who joined in with three for 28. Jade Dernbach, Ian Salisbury and Nayan Doshi also took a wicket each as Kent finished on 211, with Irish wicket-keeper Neil O'Brien top scoring with 43 – his innings tugged Kent back from 124 for 6. Andrew Hall took three quick wickets as Kent fielded, reducing Surrey to 25 for 3, but Ali Brown's quickfire 65 and Jonathan Batty's 82 turned the match around, and Rikki Clarke hit 35 to take Surrey to the target with nearly four overs to spare. (Cricinfo scorecard)

=== Hampshire v Kent (12–15 August) ===
Kent (12pts) drew with Hampshire (10pts)

Darren Stevens and Rob Key both passed 1000 first-class runs for the season as they lifted Kent to a competitive total at The Rose Bowl. Stevens top-scored with 101, while Hampshire's Australian all-rounder Andy Bichel took four for 122 – but was thoroughly smacked about by Min Patel and Amjad Khan on the second morning. The pair added 65 for the final wicket to take Kent to a first-innings total of 446. Sean Ervine hit plenty of boundaries in reply, as Hampshire eased to 82 for 1 before play was stopped due to bad weather.

On day three, however, Kent hit back. In 33 fiery overs before lunch, Amjad Khan and Min Patel both took two wickets, and despite more runs from Ervine – who finished with 74 – Hampshire crumbled to 182 for 7 at lunch. However, Andy Bichel and Nic Pothas added 138 for the eighth wicket, as Hampshire eked out 325, with Bichel top-scoring from number nine with 87 off 90 balls. Kent got a good start to their attempt to get quick runs and put a big target up for Hampshire, as they moved to 140 for 4 just before the close of play, but Shane Watson took two quick wickets and Shaun Udal one, and all of a sudden it was up to Justin Kemp and Andrew Hall to save Kent, as they were 153 for 7 overnight. Kemp fell on the fourth morning, as Kent rolled over for 185, setting up a potentially exciting finish with 307 runs to get in 83 overs. A 95-run partnership between Sean Ervine and John Crawley put Hampshire into a good position at 139 for 1, but Hampshire failed to score quickly enough, and three wickets from Simon Cook could not quite force a victory as Hampshire hung on to finish on 241 for 8 and draw the match. (Cricinfo scorecard)

=== Kent v Bangladesh A (16–17 August) ===
Kent won by three wickets

Eighteen wickets fell on the frantic first day at the St Lawrence Ground, and nineteen on the second, as two teams clashed in a low scoring match that lasted for only 173.4 overs. The Bangladesh A tourists had won the coin toss and chosen to bat, but immediately lost Nafees Iqbal for a duck. However, Tushar Imran made 86, and with some help from Shahriar Nafees (with 30) and Nazimuddin (27), he took the score to 185. That total did not look challenging, but that was before Syed Rasel's medium pace came to the scene. After Niall O'Brien and Neil Dexter put on 13 for the first wicket for Kent, Rasel and Shahadat Hossain dug out two wickets each, as Kent lost four wickets for two runs. Rasel took three more wickets before stumps on day one, and two more on the second morning, to end with seven for 50 – the only five-wicket-haul of Bangladesh A on the tour. However, only Shahriar Nafees passed 20 in the second innings, Tushar lost his golden touch (before this innings, he had made 455 runs at a batting average of 65) to only scamper 12 runs, while Antiguan-born Robert Joseph took five for 19 with his pace bowling. Kent were set 188 to win, and lost wickets at regular intervals, but 54 from the first-class debutant Dexter turned out to be crucial as Kent made it with three wickets to spare. (Cricinfo scorecard)

=== Surrey v Kent (22 August) ===
Match abandoned. Surrey (2pts), Kent (2pts)

This game, which was due to be the second and last day-night one-dayer of the season at the Oval, was abandoned because of rain. (Cricinfo scorecard)

=== Kent v Middlesex (24–27 August) ===
Kent (11pts) drew with Middlesex (11pts)

Only 36 overs of play was possible on the first day at the St Lawrence Ground, in which Middlesex made 92 runs for the loss of one wicket, that of Ben Hutton. The following day, Kent bowler Amjad Khan added two wickets to his overnight tally of one, as Middlesex crumbled to 136 for 4 on the second morning. However, centuries from Owais Shah and Paul Weekes swung it Middlesex' way, as they declared on 400 for 8. Kent's openers did not wish to be any worse, with David Fulton making 110 and Rob Key 142, and Darren Stevens supplied with the fifth century of the match, making 106 before being bowled by Nantie Hayward. They declared on 549 for 6, leaving themselves roughly three hours in which to bowl Middlesex out for 149 or less, and four wickets from Min Patel gave them hope as Middlesex crashed to 77 for 6 with more than an hour to play. However, Peter Trego kept out 98 balls for a stolid, unbeaten 3, Paul Weekes got a fifty, and Middlesex saved the draw. (Cricinfo scorecard)

=== Kent v Yorkshire (30 August) ===
Kent (4pts) beat Yorkshire (0pts) by six wickets

Kent Spitfires made their way to a fairly comfortable victory against Yorkshire Phoenix, who had opted to bat first after winning the toss. However, all the Kent bowlers got at least one wicket, and the Yorkshire batsmen could not convert their starts, as six batsmen were out with scores between 10 and 25. Kent's Andrew Hall bowled three maiden overs and took two wickets to end with the best figures of two for 19, but four bowlers grabbed two wickets each as Yorkshire were bowled out for 164. Kent were never seriously threatened in reply, as Hall put on 64 with Darren Stevens for the third wicket, and Justin Kemp had fun at the end to hit 42 not out off just 25 balls and take Kent to victory in just over two thirds of the allotted overs. Yorkshire medium pacer Ian Harvey suffered the most from Kemp's blade, conceding 40 runs in four overs. (Cricinfo scorecard)

=== Kent v Scotland (1 September) ===
Kent (4pts) beat Scotland (0pts) by 144 runs

At the St Lawrence Ground, Kent Spitfires inflicted a loss on Scottish Saltires, their seventh successive loss in the National League, as the Scottish bowlers struggled with containing Kent's batsmen and few Scottish batsmen made it into double figures. Lacking all-rounder Ryan Watson and economical bowler Paul Hoffmann, Scotland were in trouble from the outset, and Kent made 259 for 4 in their 45 overs. South Africans Andrew Hall and Justin Kemp made fifties, the latter an unbeaten 65 off 47 deliveries including four sixes. Jonathan Beukes offered some resistance with 35 for the Scots, but once he was caught and bowled by Jamie Tredwell Scotland lost the last six wickets for 32 runs, ending all out for 115. Kent bowlers Tredwell (7.1–1–16–4), Hall (7–2–17–3) and Ryan Ferley (7–0–36–3) all recorded season best bowling analyses. (Cricinfo scorecard)

=== Durham v Kent (4 September) ===
Durham (4pts) beat Kent (0pts) by eight wickets

Kent Spitfires had their run of three successive victories broken by Durham Dynamos, never recovering from a woeful start caused by ducks from James Tredwell, Joe Denly and Darren Stevens, as their three first wickets fell for two runs. Michael Carberry, who came in with the score 27 for 4, made 63 with ten fours, but no other batsman passed 30, and Neil Killeen and Gareth Breese shared the last five wickets as Kent crashed to 140. Gavin Hamilton, who made 43, and Jimmy Maher with 70 shared an opening stand of 123, and despite two wickets from Tredwell, Durham eased home in under two thirds of the allotted time. (Cricinfo scorecard)

=== Middlesex v Kent (7–10 September) ===
Middlesex (12pts) drew with Kent (9pts)

Former India A leg-spinner Yogesh Golwalkar took three wickets in each innings and helped Middlesex to dominance on points in his first first class game in England, though he had played two non-first class games for Essex Second XI in May. Kent had won the toss and batted first, struggling to 249 for 9 despite 94 from Darren Stevens, but Justin Kemp and Amjad Khan added 135 for the last wicket before Kemp was bowled by Jamie Dalrymple for 102. Middlesex still went past Kent's total of 384, however, amassing a lead as Ben Hutton and Owais Shah made centuries, and Kent's bowling was woefully unpenetrative. Only Kemp got more than two wickets, and he got numbers eight, nine and ten in the batting order. Middlesex captain Hutton batted for more than six hours for a career-best 152, while Shah's 128 was his seventh Championship century of the season. Dalrymple and Ed Joyce added fifties as Middlesex made their way to 550 for 9 at stumps on day three. Golwalkar took three wickets on the final day, but it was not enough, as Kent made it to 192 for 7 to save the draw – Andrew Hall grinding out 26 in the last 51 minutes with Niall O'Brien before conditions stopped play. (Cricinfo scorecard)

=== Kent v Nottinghamshire (14–17 September) ===
Nottinghamshire (20pts) beat Kent (3pts) by 214 runs

Nottinghamshire won the County Championship title with a victory over Kent, thanks to an overnight declaration from their opponents, two big innings from Jason Gallian and a second-innings six-wicket-haul from Andrew Harris. Nottinghamshire knew that 12 points, i.e. a draw and the maximum number of bonus points, would secure the title, and their batting set about making 400 with ease. Darren Bicknell and Gallian opened the batting for the visitors, and they were together for nearly three hours, sharing an opening stand of 157. Simon Cook finally broke through the defences, and two quick wickets from Amjad Khan contributed as Nottinghamshire were set back to 194 for 4. However, the former England wicket-keeper Chris Read made 75, while Gallian moved to 191 not out, as Nottinghamshire amassed 397 for 5 on the first day.

The second day's play was interrupted by rain, but Kent did manage to take the wicket of Gallian – he was run out for 199, his second score of 199 this season. However, 72 from Mark Ealham put the visitors firmly in control, and they declared on 486 for 8. David Fulton and Rob Key fought back for Kent, adding 66 for the first wicket, but a burst of wickets from Graeme Swann and Mark Ealham changed the picture somewhat, as Kent lost four wickets for 19 runs and were 108 for 5. Youngsters Neil Dexter and Niall O'Brien kept their cool, however, sharing a 129-run stand for the sixth wicket as they both notched up half-centuries. Kent declared overnight, and got immediate rewards when Dexter dismissed David Hussey for a golden duck, but the next 24 overs saw runs hit at a rapid rate. Gallian made 74 not out, sharing a 116-run stand with Chris Read, and Nottinghamshire raced to 170 for 3 before declaring. Set 420 to win in about five hours, Kent surrendered to Andrew Harris, who got six wickets for 76. South African Martin van Jaarsveld made 64 for Kent, but he and O'Brien were the only two to bat for more than half an hour, and in the end Nottinghamshire earned the victory and their first County Championship title since 1989 (Cricinfo scorecard)

=== Kent v Sussex (18 September) ===
Sussex (4pts) beat Kent (0pts) by 61 runs

Sussex Sharks were put in to bat at the St Lawrence Ground, and although they lost nine wickets, they still managed 230 runs in their 45 overs. Chris Adams and Richard Montgomerie put on 111 for the second wicket after Matt Prior was caught behind for 4, and although five wickets fell for 42 in a period which saw them to 209 for 8, Carl Hopkinson and Mushtaq Ahmed added 21 for the ninth wicket. The Spitfires' innings started with losing Neil Dexter for a five-ball duck, bowled by James Kirtley, and Robin Martin-Jenkins had three men caught as Kent lost their first five wickets for 48. Despite 51 from Michael Carberry Kent never got anywhere near the target, Kirtley taking the final wickets as Kent finished on 169. (Cricinfo scorecard)

=== Sussex v Kent (21–23 September) ===
Sussex (20pts) beat Kent (5pts) by eight wickets

Sussex' three main bowlers won them the game at Hove against Kent – James Kirtley took seven for 103, Rana Naved-ul-Hasan six for 124, and Mushtaq Ahmed five for 173 in the match, as Sussex took an eight-wicket victory. Sussex took three wickets in the first 45 minutes, courtesy of Kirtley and Rana, and for only 28 runs in reply. Matthew Walker and Darren Stevens added 52 together for the fourth wicket, but it was the half-centuries from Min Patel and Niall O'Brien – his second in successive matches – that carried Kent past 200. They finished on 257, with Kirtley and Naved-ul-Hasan taking four wickets each, while Mushtaq had to be content with two for 81 from nearly 28 overs. Sussex, however, ground out 47 for 2 wickets in the 23 remaining overs, the Kent spinners Patel and Jamie Tredwell keeping them from scoring.

On the second day, Sussex accelerated, but after five wickets from Patel they were 192 for 8, still trailing by 65. However, Mushtaq forged partnerships of 86 and 74 with Luke Wright and James Kirtley respectively, hitting an unbeaten 90 himself as Sussex ended on 348. Kent trailed by 89, and in the second innings Rob Key hit eleven fours in a two-hour 84, but he was dismissed by Robin Martin-Jenkins just before the close of the second day's play to leave Kent with a lead of 53 with seven wickets in hand. Kirtley, Rana and Mushtaq removed the last seven wickets for 94 runs on day three, leaving Sussex 148 to chase, which they did inside two hours thanks to half-centuries from Carl Hopkinson and Michael Yardy. (Cricinfo scorecard)

=== Leicestershire v Kent (25 September) ===
Leicestershire (4pts) beat Kent (0pts) by 40 runs on the Duckworth–Lewis method

Leicestershire Foxes recorded 280 for 5 batting first at Grace Road, with captain HD Ackerman leading from the front with 78. Half-centuries also came from Darren Maddy and Dinesh Mongia, while the medium pace of Neil Dexter yielded two wickets – but conceded 33 runs in five overs. Kent Spitfires got off to a good start, with Darren Stevens hitting twelve fours and a six in his 76 – adding 106 with Martin van Jaarsveld. However, once rain shortened their innings to 33 overs and their target from 281 to 211, they failed to keep up with the required rate, ending with 170 for 6 with England Under-19 player Stuart Broad taking two for 35. (Cricinfo scorecard)
