= David Alleyne (cricketer) =

English cricketer

Personal information
- Full name: David Alleyne
- Born: 17 April 1976 (age 50); York, England
- Height: 5 ft 11 in (1.80 m)
- Batting: Right-handed
- Role: Wicket-keeper

Domestic team information
- Years: Team
- 1999–2003: Middlesex
- 2004–2006: Nottinghamshire
- FC debut: 2 August 2001 Middlesex v Sussex
- Last FC: 20 September 2006 Nottinghamshire v Sussex
- LA debut: 19 September 1999 Middlesex v Glamorgan
- Last LA: 17 September 2006 Nottinghamshire v Sussex

Career statistics
Competition	FC	LA	T20
Matches	22	38	11
Runs scored	849	321	36
Batting average	29.27	11.06	18.00
100s/50s	1/4	0/1	0/0
Top score	109*	58	24*
Catches/stumpings	57/5	29/7	6/0
- Source: CricketArchive, 3 December 2008

David Alleyne (born 17 April 1976) is a former English first-class cricketer who played for Middlesex and Nottinghamshire. He was primarily a wicket-keeper, "whose limitations with the bat severely limited his opportunities" and therefore primarily played in second XI cricket during his eleven seasons as a professional.

== Professional career ==
=== 1997-2003: understudy at Middlesex ===
Alleyne signed for Middlesex in 1997 as a wicketkeeper-batsman. In his first season at Middlesex he exclusively played in the second XI, sharing the gloves with David Nash and appearing in six matches, scoring 193 runs at 27.57. His 1998 season was even more limited, with no first team appearances and only a single second team appearance for Middlesex. The 1999 season saw Alleyne return to regular second XI action, scoring 327 runs at 23.35, although still without a first-class appearance; he did, however, make his debut for the first team in List A cricket, scoring 13 and taking two catches and a stumping against Glamorgan in the CGU National League.

The 2000 season saw Alleyne continue his long apprenticeship in the second XI without playing in the County Championship, scoring 333 runs at 23.78 in his ten matches. This season saw him break through to become a regular in Middlesex's List A side, making 13 appearances in that format and scoring his maiden first XI half century, scoring 58 while opening the batting against Nottinghamshire in the Norwich Union National League.

Alleyne finally made his first-class debut in 2001, playing in the County Championship matches against Sussex, where he took 4 catches and scored seven runs in his two innings; and Gloucestershire, where he scored 3 in the first innings and 44 in the second as Middlesex were "abject" and lost by an innings. However, he lost his spot in Middlesex's limited overs side, playing in only one List A game, the Norwich Union League match against Lancashire. Most of his cricket came once again in the second XI championship, where he made nine appearances over the course of the year.

The 2002 first-class season was much like the 2001 season for Alleyne- he once again played in two County Championship matches, this time scoring 62 runs between them and taking four catches. He did, however, return to more regular List A action, playing seven matches in the Norwich Union League, although with limited returns as he scored 26 runs in his six innings. He made a further eleven appearances for Middlesex's second XI.

2003 was Alleyne's final year at Middlesex, and was one in which he again did not feature in first-class cricket. He did play in Middlesex's limited overs side, with five appearances in the National League and a further three in the Cheltenham & Gloucester Trophy. Across those matches, he scored 22 runs at 7.33 while taking three catches.

=== Move to Nottinghamshire ===
Following his departure from Middlesex, Alleyne signed for Nottinghamshire on a two-year deal in October 2003, with incumbent Chris Read expected to play regularly for England and therefore be unavailable for his county. However, Read's England career did not pan out as expected, and he was therefore a regular in the Notts side - indeed, he did not miss a single match in the 2007 season - which relegated Alleyne, once again, to second XI duty.

Alleyne's first year at Notts was 2004, playing in the three first-class matches in which Read did not appear. In those limited opportunities he scored 69 runs, while taking eight catches. He therefore spent most of the season in the 2nd XI, where he was Notts 2s leading run-scorer, with 853 runs at an average of 53.31 to go with 28 dismissals behind the stumps. The 2005 season was also largely spent in the second XI, with Alleyne making only one appearance for the first team in the County Championship, against Surrey, scoring 46 runs and taking 5 catches. He was an ever-present in the Notts 2nd XI side who were runners up in the 2nd XI championship, scoring 637 runs at an impressive average of 63.70. 2006 proved to be Alleyne's best season at Notts. Playing in 10 of the 16 County Championship matches, he scored 537 runs at 31.58, while taking 26 catches and 5 stumpings. He had a particularly strong game against Warwickshire at Trent Bridge, scoring 57 in the first innings and 109 not out in the second innings, while taking nine dismissals. However, 2006 was also the last time Alleyne played first-class cricket; by July he had not appeared for the first XI, and had made only two second XI appearances. He therefore agreed terms to be released from his contract, which was due to run until the end of 2008, departing in mid-July "to look for first team cricket". However, he was not signed by any other county after leaving Notts.

== After retirement ==
Following the end of his first-class career, Alleyne briefly appeared for Hertfordshire in the Minor Counties Championship, playing in four matches in the 2010 season, but with limited returns as his eight innings brought him just 186 runs with a highest score of 50 and one catch. He also played in the Victoria Premier League for several seasons, having emigrated to Australia.
