= Rudi Singh =

English cricketer

Anirudh Singh
Personal information
- Full name: Anirudh Singh
- Born: 28 December 1983 (age 42); Birmingham, Warwickshire, England
- Batting: Right-handed
- Bowling: [Right-arm [leg break]]
- Relatives: Anurag Singh (brother)

Domestic team information
- Years: Team
- 2003–2005: Cambridge University
- 2004: Cambridge UCCE

Career statistics
| Competition | First-class |
|---|---|
| Matches | 5 |
| Runs scored | 176 |
| Batting average | 19.55 |
| 100s/50s | 0/1 |
| Top score | 75 |
| Balls bowled | 24 |
| Wickets | 0 |
| Bowling average | – |
| 5 wickets in innings | – |
| 10 wickets in match | – |
| Best bowling | – |
| Catches/stumpings | 0/– |
- Source: Cricinfo, 1 September 2020

Anirudh Singh (born 28 December 1983) is an English former first-class cricketer.

Singh was born at Birmingham in December 1983 to Indian parents from Uttar Pradesh who had emigrated to England. He was educated in Birmingham at King Edward's School, before going up to Gonville and Caius College, Cambridge. While studying at Cambridge, he made three appearances in first-class cricket for Cambridge University against Oxford University in The University Matches of 2003, 2004 and 2005. He also played for Cambridge UCCE in 2004, making two appearances. (Note: Cambridge UCCE differed from Cambridge University Cricket Club in that it was open to students at Anglia Ruskin University, whereas Cambridge University Cricket Club is exclusively for students of the constituent colleges of the University of Cambridge.) In five first-class matches, he scored 176 runs, making 113 for Cambridge University and 63 for Cambridge UCCE. His highest first-class score of 75 came for Cambridge University in The University Match of 2005 at Fenner's. His brother, Anurag, captained Cambridge University and played first-class cricket at county level.
