= Mark Wagh =

English cricketer (born 1976)

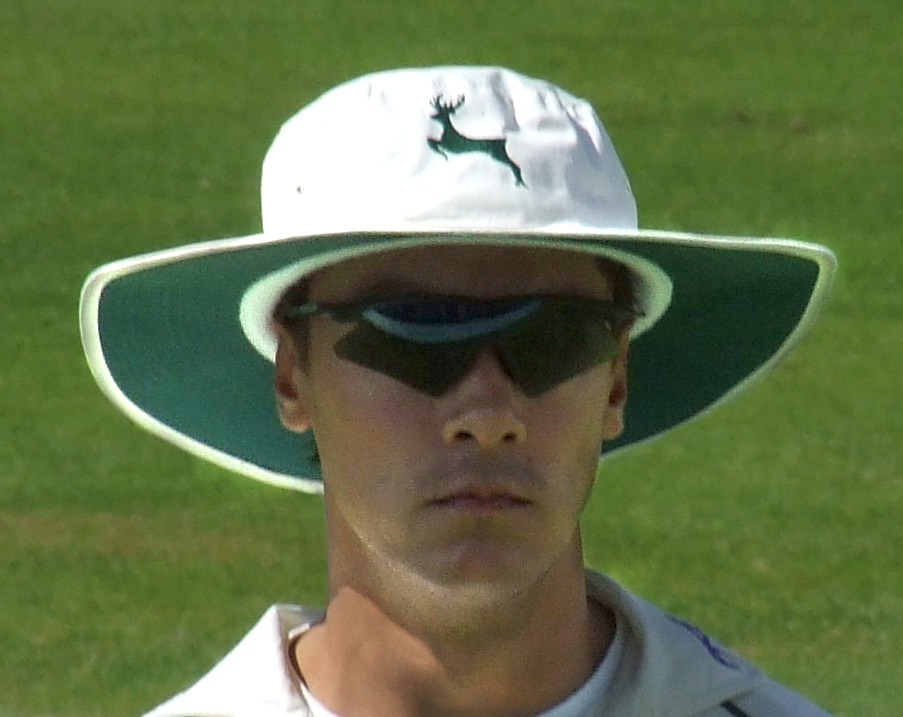

Personal information
- Born: 20 October 1976 (age 50); Birmingham
- Batting: Right-handed
- Bowling: Right-arm off-breaks

Domestic team information
- Years: Team
- 1996–1998: Oxford University
- 1997–2006: Warwickshire
- 2007–2011: Nottinghamshire
- FC debut: 13 April 1996 Oxford University v Leicestershire
- Last FC: 29 May 2011 Nottinghamshire v Worcestershire

Career statistics
Competition	FC	LA	T20
Matches	212	114	18
Runs scored	12,455	2,751	288
Batting average	38.80	27.23	19.20
100s/50s	31/58	1/21	0/1
Top score	315	102*	56
Balls bowled	8697	1096	75
Wickets	100	25	5
Bowling average	46.11	34.48	21.20
5 wickets in innings	2	0	0
10 wickets in match	0	0	0
Best bowling	7/222	4/35	2/16
Catches/stumpings	91/–	21/–	5/–
- Source: CricketArchive, 14 March 2016

Mark Anant Wagh (born 20 October 1976) is a former English cricketer who played for Warwickshire and Nottinghamshire. He attended King Edward's School, Birmingham where he played alongside Anurag Singh, in the year group team two years above his own (one year above Singh's).

Having originally played first-class cricket for Oxford University, captaining them in 1997 and playing against opposing captain and friend Anurag Singh in the annual Varsity Match (cricket), he made his debut for Warwickshire in the same year. He received his county cap in 2000, and was selected for the England A tour of Australia in 2001 after hitting a massive 315 at Lord's in the county season. However, whilst fellow Academy member and teammate Ian Bell has gone on to an extended England career, Wagh has not since been called up, barring an inclusion in a preliminary squad for the ICC Champions Trophy in 2004.

Whilst Wagh is principally considered a batsman and opened for Warwickshire in first-class and limited overs cricket, he is also a useful off-spinner, with career best figures of 7–222 against Lancashire in 2003. This followed a ban in 2000 after his action was reported for throwing. Since then, he has more than once closed out close games for the club with his bowling.

Having missed the whole of the 2005 season after a serious knee injury, Wagh featured in Warwickshire's first team during 2006 after strong performances in the Twenty20 season, promoted following injury to Warwickshire teammate, Nick Knight. At the end of 2006, despite having two years remaining on his Warwickshire contract, the county allowed him to move to Nottinghamshire. Wagh was rewarded for his consistent batting form with Nottinghamshire's Player of the Season award for 2007.

He wrote a diary of his 2008 season, which was published under the title Pavilion to Crease ... and Back.

Wagh retired from professional cricket on 1 June 2011 to pursue a career in law. He is now working as an associate at Latham & Watkins in London.
