= Nick Warren (cricketer) =

English cricketer

Personal information
- Full name: Nicholas Alexander Warren
- Born: 26 June 1982 (age 44); Moseley, Birmingham, England
- Height: 5 ft 11 in (1.80 m)
- Batting: Right-handed
- Bowling: Right arm fast-medium
- Role: Bowler

Domestic team information
- Years: Team
- 2002–2005: Warwickshire

Career statistics
Competition	FC	LA	T20
Matches	8	5	2
Runs scored	24	2	1
Batting average	6.00	1.00	1.00
100s/50s	0/0	0/0	0/0
Top score	11	158	1*
Balls bowled	936	168	36
Wickets	14	3	4
Bowling average	44.85	63.00	16.00
5 wickets in innings	0	0	0
10 wickets in match	0	0	0
Best bowling	3/40	3/34	3/25
Catches/stumpings	0/–	2/–	1/–
- Source: CricketArchive, 23 June 2008

Nicholas Alexander Warren (born 26 June 1982) is a former English cricketer who played a number of senior games for Warwickshire County Cricket Club between 2002 and 2005, although he made his List A debut for the Warwickshire Cricket Board side in 2001. He was a right-handed batsman and his bowling style was right arm fast-medium. He was born in Moseley, Birmingham.

He was said to have shown potential in the England Under 17 team against Ireland in 1999, and he went on to tour Malaysia with the Under 19's, and played in the Youth World Cup in Sri Lanka during 1999–2000. While in the England A cricket team, his Youth Test debut came in 2002 against West Indies A.

However, Warren's career appeared to be on the verge of decline when his contract at Warwickshire was ended in 2003. During his fight to keep his place, he missed three months of play due to a stress-fracture of the spine in 2004. However a run of 'impressive performances' earned him a renewal on his contract, in which he played Northamptonshire in the Frizzell County Championship, taking three wickets for one run in ten balls.

Warren did not hold down his place, however, and did not appear for the first team after the 2005 season.
