= Andrew Harris (cricketer, born 1973) =

English cricketer

A. J. Harris
Personal information
- Full name: Andrew James Harris
- Born: 26 June 1973 (age 53); Ashton-under-Lyne, Lancashire
- Height: 6 ft 0 in (1.83 m)
- Batting: Right-handed
- Bowling: Right-arm medium
- Role: Bowler

Domestic team information
- Years: Team
- 1994–1999: Derbyshire
- 2000–2008: Nottinghamshire
- 2008: Worcestershire
- 2008 (loan): Gloucestershire
- 2009–2010: Leicestershire
- 2011: Staffordshire

Career statistics
Competition	FC	LA	T20
Matches	135	149	29
Runs scored	1,139	224	12
Batting average	8.37	7.00	4.00
100s/50s	0/0	0/0	0/0
Top score	41*	34	6*
Balls bowled	22,700	6,610	524
Wickets	424	194	28
Bowling average	32.02	28.77	26.32
5 wickets in innings	16	1	0
10 wickets in match	3	0	0
Best bowling	7/54	5/35	2/13
Catches/stumpings	36/–	28/–	4/–
- Source: CricketArchive, 28 July 2009

Andrew James Harris (born 26 June 1973), commonly known as A. J. Harris, is a former English first-class cricketer. A right-arm medium-pace bowler and a right-handed batsman, Harris made more than 120 appearances, taking over 400 wickets at an average of just over 31.

== Biography ==
Born 26 June 1973 in Ashton-under-Lyne, Lancashire, Harris turned professional in 1993, making his first-class and List A debuts for Derbyshire County Cricket Club that summer. In the 1996 season Harris played well, as his team challenged for the County Championship. His performance led to a place on the England A tour to Australia the following winter. The tour was successful, but this was the peak of Harris's achievements. He was affected by various injuries, causing him to be unable to string a run of games together.

In 2000, Harris moved to Nottinghamshire, where he continued to show his ability despite spells on the sidelines. In 2003 against Durham UCCE, Harris became the fourth player in the history of first-class cricket to be given out timed out. Harris was a key member of Nottinghamshire's Championship-winning side of 2005, taking 49 wickets. He was awarded a benefit year by the club for 2008.

In 2006, he along with Chris Read holds the highest 9th wicket partnership in List A cricket history (155)

In June 2008, he joined Gloucestershire to bring some experience to bolster the performances of an under-performing seam attack. He joined for a loan period that will include the Cheltenham Festival later in the summer. He ended the season by making a number of appearances for Worcestershire. He signed for Leicestershire in 2009 and made his debut against Northamptonshire.

He is married to Kate and they have two sons, Jacob and Max.
