= Anurag Singh (cricketer, born 1975) =

English cricketer

Personal information
- Born: 9 September 1975 (age 51); Kanpur, Uttar Pradesh, India
- Height: 5 ft 11 in (1.80 m)
- Batting: Right-handed
- Bowling: Right-arm offspin
- Relatives: Rudi Singh (brother)

Domestic team information
- Years: Team
- 1995–2000: Warwickshire
- 1996–1998: Cambridge University
- 2001–2003: Worcestershire
- 2004–2006: Nottinghamshire
- FC debut: 27 July 1995 Warwickshire v Northamptonshire
- Last FC: 27 April 2006 Nottinghamshire v Durham UCCE
- LA debut: 26 April 1996 British Universities v Kent
- Last LA: 25 June 2006 Nottinghamshire v Northamptonshire

Career statistics
Competition	FC	LA	T20
Matches	108	116	3
Runs scored	5,437	3,031	59
Batting average	32.17	28.06	19.66
100s/50s	11/24	1/20	0/0
Top score	187	123	35
Balls bowled	101	–	–
Wickets	0	–	–
Bowling average	–	–	–
5 wickets in innings	–	–	–
10 wickets in match	–	–	–
Best bowling	–	–	–
Catches/stumpings	42/–	29/–	0/–
- Source: CricketArchive, 6 July 2014

Anurag Singh (born 9 September 1975) is a British former first-class cricketer. He is a right-handed batsman and a right-arm off spin bowler.

Singh was born in Kanpur, Uttar Pradesh, India, but moved to England and attended King Edward's School, Birmingham where he played alongside Mark Wagh. He began his cricketing career at Warwickshire and represented England at U-19 level in 1994 and 1995 alongside players such as Marcus Trescothick, Michael Vaughan and Andrew Flintoff. Singh later attended the University of Cambridge and captained Cambridge University Cricket Club in 1997 and 1998, playing in the annual Oxford vs Cambridge varsity match at Lord's. He divided his time between them and Warwickshire and captained the British Universities cricket team during this period.

However, Singh struggled to live up to his initial promise, and having failed to establish himself at Warwickshire, he moved to Worcestershire in 2000 in search of new opportunities. In 2003, he was signed by Nottinghamshire as a replacement for Usman Afzaal. He was released by Nottinghamshire at the end of the 2006 season.

Singh's top score from a decade's worth of cricket is 187, and he has a career average of 32.
