= Kevin Jones (cricketer) =

English cricketer

Personal information
- Full name: Kevin John Francis Jones
- Born: 9 September 1986 (age 40); Gillingham, Kent
- Batting: Right-handed
- Bowling: Right-arm medium

Domestic team information
- Years: Team
- 2005: Kent
- Only FC: 16 August 2005 Kent v Bangladesh A

Career statistics
Competition	First-class
Matches	1
Runs scored	14
Batting average	7.00
100s/50s	0/0
Top score	14
Catches/stumpings	1/–
- Source: CricInfo, 31 May 2016

Kevin Jones (born 9 September 1986) is a former English professional cricketer. Jones made one first-class cricket appearance for Kent County Cricket Club in 2005. He was born in Gillingham, Kent in 1986.

Jones was a member of the Cricket Academy at Kent and represented the county at youth level. He first played for Kent's Second XI in 2003 before making his only senior appearance in August 2005 against the touring Bangladesh A team.

Jones went on to play for Kent's Second XI and MCC Young Cricketers in the Second XI Championship and Second XI Trophy until the end of the 2007 season, making 30 appearances in the Championship and 19 in the Trophy. He played club cricket in the Kent Cricket League between 2003 and 2014, primarily for Gore Court in Sittingbourne, although in the 2011 and 2012 seasons he played for Lorsdwood, scoring 43 runs from 20 balls on his debut for the team. He was the league's Young Player of the Year in 2005 and has since gone on to play village cricket for Rodmersham.
