= Gareth Clough =

English cricketer

Gareth Clough (born 23 May 1978, Leeds, Yorkshire, England) is an English first-class cricketer. He is a right-handed batsman and a right-arm medium-pace bowler. He has played first-class cricket for both Yorkshire (1998), and more regularly and recently, for Nottinghamshire (2000–2008).

Clough played extensively throughout Nottinghamshire's promotion-winning season of 2004, earning a new contract until the end of 2006. Clough's tidy bowling and fielding agility made him useful in limited-overs cricket. It was in the one-day format where he was used most frequently in 2005, and despite only playing one game in Nottinghamshire's County Championship campaign, he remained useful in this format until his retirement in 2008.

Clough played for Lincolnshire in the Minor Counties Cricket Championship in 2008 and 2009.

Clough is now working as a teacher in a school in Batley. He decided to become a teacher after getting injured whilst he was playing cricket.
