= Jason Gallian =

Australian cricketer

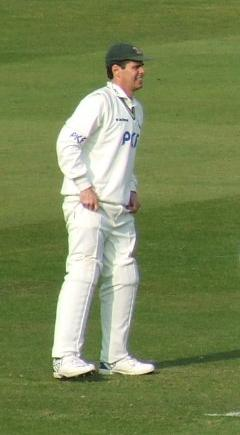

Personal information
- Full name: Jason Edward Riche Gallian
- Born: 25 June 1971 (age 55); Manly, Sydney, New South Wales, Australia
- Batting: Right-handed
- Bowling: Right-arm medium

International information
- National side: England
- Test debut (cap 573): 6 July 1995 v West Indies
- Last Test: 30 December 1995 v South Africa

Domestic team information
- Years: Team
- 1990–1993: Oxford University
- 1993–1997: Lancashire
- 1998–2007: Nottinghamshire
- 2008–2009: Essex

Career statistics
Competition	Test	FC	LA	T20
Matches	3	259	231	16
Runs scored	74	15,266	6,754	315
Batting average	12.33	37.50	32.31	19.68
100s/50s	0/0	38/72	11/40	0/2
Top score	28	312	134	62
Balls bowled	84	7,162	2,049	0
Wickets	0	96	55	–
Bowling average	–	43.37	32.87	–
5 wickets in innings	–	1	1	–
10 wickets in match	–	0	0	–
Best bowling	–	6/115	5/15	–
Catches/stumpings	1/–	231/–	77/–	5/–
- Source: CricketArchive, 30 October 2009

Jason Edward Riche Gallian (born 25 June 1971) is a former English Test cricketer. A right-handed opening batter, originally from Australia. He captained their Under-19 side for two Under-19 Tests in 1989 and 1990. He played three Test matches for England, with a highest score of 28 runs. Gallian was a county professional for fifteen years, playing for Lancashire, Nottinghamshire including a period as captain, and Essex before retiring in 2009. Gallian scored 171 on his Championship debut for Essex.

In September 2005, Gallian became the first player to have twice been dismissed for 199 in first-class cricket when he was run out against Kent. His previous dismissal for that score had been in April of the same season against Sussex, and on that occasion he was also run out.

== Early career ==
Gallian was born at Manly, New South Wales and captained the Australian under-19 side against its English counterpart in 1989. He was educated at Keble College, Oxford, reading Diplomacy and Social Studies, which he described as "a course that allowed me time to play cricket in my third year". He played for Oxford University 1990–1993, and captained in the 1993 Varsity Match in which he scored 115 and 53 not out. During this time Gallian frequently opened both the batting and the bowling, though his medium-paced bowling was later only used in partnership-breaking capacities.

== Lancashire ==
Gallian began his first-class career at Lancashire and his 1996 innings of 312 was the highest score at Old Trafford. Lasting 670 minutes, as of 2021 it remains the longest innings in the history of the County Championship.

== Nottinghamshire ==
After Nottinghamshire were relegated in 2003, batsman Kevin Pietersen requested a release from his contract, stating he was unhappy at the club. This led to a public row with Gallian, then the captain of the club, during which Gallian allegedly threw Pietersen's kit off the Trent Bridge balcony and broke his bat. Pietersen recounted:

During the game I told the captain that I was not happy and that I wanted to leave. After the game we spoke in the dressing room and then I went to have dinner. I got a call saying the captain had trashed my equipment. I was told the captain had said, "if he does not want to play for Notts he can f*** off." I have not spoken to Gallian since, nor have I received an apology.

Pietersen was forced to complete the last year of his contract with Nottinghamshire, but "didn't enjoy it at all". Nottinghamshire were promoted back to Division One after winning the Second Division in 2004. Alongside David Hussey and Darren Bicknell, Gallian was one of three batters to score more than 1,000 runs for Nottinghamshire in the County Championship that season.

== Essex ==
When Gallian's contract with Nottinghamshire expired at the end of 2007, he signed a two-year contract with Essex. Essex chose to give Gallian a contract to provide experience to their young squad. David East, the club's chief executive, said "He has a very impressive record and his vast experience will greatly assist our young and exciting batsmen to develop over the next few years. Jason is very excited about this next stage in his career and is looking forward to joining what he describes as a young and vibrant squad that is going places".

Gallian announced his retirement from cricket in August 2009, having made five first-class appearances for Essex during the 2009 season.

Gallian now plays club cricket for Saffron Walden and is the head of cricket at Felsted School, Essex, and teaches geography.

=== Interim Chair of Essex County Cricket Club ===
Jason Gallian was appointed as the interim chair of Essex County Cricket Club following the resignation of Anu Mohindru, to oversee the board's operations during a transitional period. Vicky Ford assumed the position of interim deputy chair. He announced he was stepping down from the role in the July 2026 AGM.

Sporting positions
Preceded by Paul Johnson	Nottinghamshire County cricket captain 1998–2004	Succeeded by Stephen Fleming
