= Darren Bicknell =

English cricketer (born 1967)

Personal information
- Full name: Darren John Bicknell
- Born: 24 June 1967 (age 59); Guildford, Surrey, England
- Nickname: Denz, Bickers
- Height: 6 ft 4 in (1.93 m)
- Batting: Left-handed
- Bowling: Slow left-arm orthodox
- Role: Batsman
- Relatives: Martin Bicknell (brother)

Domestic team information
- Years: Team
- 1987–1999: Surrey
- 2000–2006: Nottinghamshire
- FC debut: 20 May 1987 Surrey v Warwickshire
- Last FC: 20 September 2006 Nottinghamshire v Sussex
- LA debut: 27 May 1987 Surrey v Worcestershire
- Last LA: 17 September 2006 Nottinghamshire v Sussex

Career statistics
Competition	FC	LA	T20
Matches	324	236	1
Runs scored	19,931	7,522	10
Batting average	38.55	37.61	10.00
100s/50s	46/91	10/52	0/0
Top score	235*	135*	10
Balls bowled	1,569	84	–
Wickets	29	3	–
Bowling average	35.00	27.33	–
5 wickets in innings	0	0	–
10 wickets in match	0	0	–
Best bowling	3/7	1/11	–
Catches/stumpings	107/–	55/–	0/–
- Source: CricketArchive, 3 January 2009

Darren John Bicknell (born 24 June 1967) is an English former cricketer. He is a left-handed batsman and a slow left-arm bowler.

Born in Guildford, Darren is the brother of former England seam bowler Martin Bicknell. Darren was tipped for a test call-up early in his career but never got the call, the selectors instead preferring players such as Jason Gallian and Mark Lathwell. Most of Bicknell's career was spent at Surrey, but he finished his career with seven seasons at Nottinghamshire, before retiring at the end of the 2006 season.

== Current activities ==
Darren is now the professional and cricket coach at Oakham School, and Chief Executive of the Belvoir Cricket and Countryside Trust, a charitable organisation which aims to provide cricket and other sporting activities for young people. Other patrons of the trust include Jonathan Agnew, Anton du Beke and Graeme Swann. He is also a governor at Redmile Primary School, and a member of Radcliffe-on-Trent Golf Club playing off a handicap of 7.
