= Chris Read =

English cricketer (born 1978)

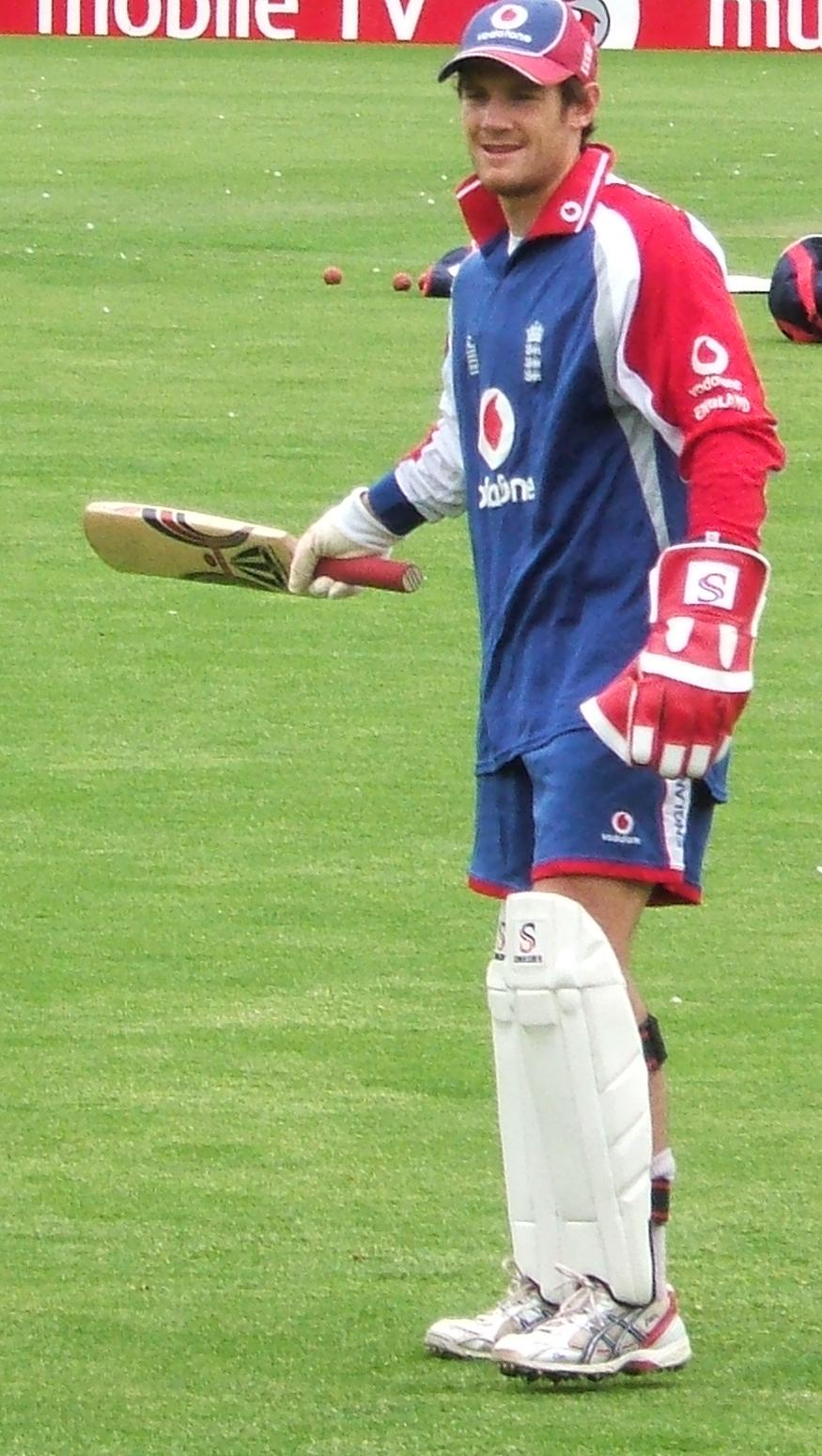

Personal information
- Full name: Christopher Mark Wells Read
- Born: 10 August 1978 (age 48); Paignton, England
- Nickname: Reados
- Height: 5 ft 8 in (1.73 m)
- Batting: Right-handed
- Bowling: Right-arm medium
- Role: Wicket-keeper

International information
- National side: England (1999–2007)
- Test debut (cap 595): 1 July 1999 v New Zealand
- Last Test: 5 January 2007 v Australia
- ODI debut (cap 155): 23 January 2000 v South Africa
- Last ODI: 28 October 2006 v West Indies
- ODI shirt no.: 98

Domestic team information
- Years: Team
- 1995–1997: Devon
- 1997: Gloucestershire
- 1998–2017: Nottinghamshire (squad no. 7)

Career statistics
Competition	Test	ODI	FC	LA
Matches	15	36	350	333
Runs scored	360	300	16,483	5,564
Batting average	18.94	17.64	37.46	29.13
100s/50s	0/1	0/0	27/92	2/24
Top score	55	30*	240	135
Catches/stumpings	48/6	41/2	1056/53	319/73
- Source: ESPNcricinfo, 1 July 2020

Christopher Mark Wells Read (born 10 August 1978) is an English former cricketer who was the captain of Nottinghamshire County Cricket Club. He played for the England cricket team in 15 Tests and 36 ODIs. He was a wicket-keeper.

== Personal life ==
On 4 November 2007 Read ran the New York City Marathon to raise money for Bowel Cancer UK in honour of his first cricket coach, Trevor Ward, who died of the disease. Read finished 4,358th out of over 38,000 runners.

== Domestic career ==
Read played for Devon in a NatWest Trophy match at the age of 16, and in 1997 made a single AXA Life League appearance for Gloucestershire, claiming an NBC Denis Compton Award that year. After an England A tour to Kenya and Sri Lanka in the winter - making his first-class debut in Nairobi - Read was picked up by Nottinghamshire for the 1998 season. By June he had established himself in the side and he claimed 42 dismissals that summer as well as making 401 runs.

=== County years ===
Several years in the international wilderness followed, Read being overlooked in favour of first Paul Nixon and then James Foster as keeper-in-waiting in preparation for the retirement of Alec Stewart. Left to concentrate on his county cricket career, Read claimed 68 dismissals in 2002 and worked at his batting, that year averaging nearly 35 with another hundred coming against Northamptonshire. He made a one-day century against the same opponents early in 2003 and with Stewart's retirement from international one-day cricket, he was recalled by England that year, playing in all ten ODIs.

=== Return to county cricket ===
In the 2004 English season, Jones was preferred for the series against New Zealand and West Indies in both Tests and One-Day Internationals, having made a century in the second Test of the New Zealand series. Read returned to Nottinghamshire and had by far his best season with the bat: he scored 807 first-class runs including two centuries, and averaged over 50. The selectors stuck with Jones, however, and by the summer of 2005 Read was not even second-choice keeper for England in ODIs, Matt Prior of Sussex being preferred for the role. Read was again overlooked in the squad for the winter tour of Pakistan, instead being selected for the second-tier ECB National Academy squad. As first choice wicket-keeper in the academy squad, Read got several opportunities to play, and had a successful tour, scoring 254 runs at an average of 66.25 in the West Indies before he had to prematurely return home to attend to a family emergency.

Read continued to be on the fringes of England squads, and was selected for the England 'A' team against the touring Pakistan side in 2006, off the back of a strong start to the county season which had seen him average 50 in both formats of the game. He took advantage of his selection, scoring an unbeaten 150 in the tour match. Soon after, Geraint Jones, who had remained first choice for England despite a slump in batting form, broke a finger in the second Test match against Pakistan in 2006; the next day Read scored a rapid 72 against Northamptonshire in a Natwest Pro 40 League game.

In September 2007, Read took over as the captain of Nottinghamshire. The team were promoted in the championship that summer and Read averaged 54.17 with the bat. In 2009 Read had an excellent season with Nottinghamshire, scoring 1,203 runs at an average of 75.18 including 4 centuries in first-class cricket. His form with the bat has largely continued since.

He averaged 45.80 in 2010, as he led the team to their sixth championship. In 2013 he top-scored with 53 off 52 balls as they won the 2013 Yorkshire Bank 40 final. The next two years saw Read hit a purple patch, averaging 43.85 in 2014 and 51.35 in 2015 (topping the Nottinghamshire averages, and passing both 15,000 first-class runs and 1,000 first-class dismissals that season, with his 1000th dismissal being Paul Collingwood.). This form wasn't sustained as Nottinghamshire were relegated in 2016. In March 2017, Read announced his plan to retire at the end of the season, after 20 years with the county, to become director of cricket at Uppingham School]. In his final season, he led Nottinghamshire to promotion, secured in the last game when Read's 124 was crucial in getting Nottinghamshire the maximum batting points required to finish second. Nottinghamshire also won the Royal London One Day Cup in 2017, under the captaincy of Dan Christian, with Read scoring 58 off 57 balls in the final.

In July 2014, he played for the MCC side in the Bicentenary Celebration match at Lord's.

== International career ==
=== Debut years ===
He toured Zimbabwe and South Africa with the A team the following winter, and in 1999 his maiden first-class century, a well-timed 160 against Warwickshire, brought him selection for the first Test against New Zealand at Edgbaston. Still not 21, Read made a good impression: although he failed with the bat, he claimed eight dismissals, six in the second innings alone. He was retained for Lord's, but suffered a very public embarrassment when he was bowled for zero, ducking what he thought was a beamer from Chris Cairns but was in fact a well-disguised slower ball. 37 in the second innings was followed by another duck at Old Trafford, and he was dropped, though he did play in the 1999/2000 One Day International series in South Africa.

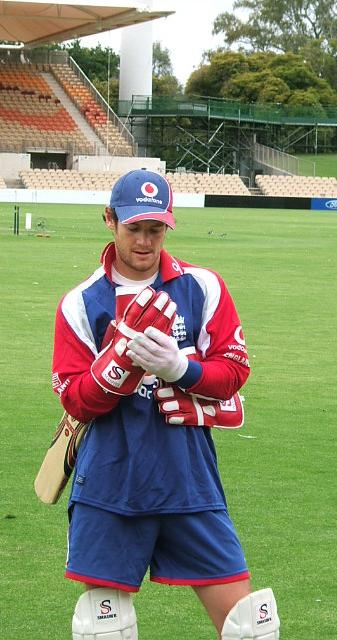
Read prepares for wicketkeeping practice at Adelaide Oval

=== Return in 2004 ===
Read was first-choice keeper for the 2003/04 tours and played in eight of the nine Tests that winter, against Bangladesh, Sri Lanka and West Indies. However, for the final Test of the West Indies series, in Antigua, he was replaced by Kent wicket-keeper Geraint Jones. This would be the game in which Brian Lara made his world-record score of 400 not out. Read was retained for the one-day squad however, winning the man-of-the match award in the first game of that series, for a quickfire unbeaten 27 in a rain-affected run chase.

On 31 July Read was recalled to the England squad as a replacement for Jones. Chairman of Selectors David Graveney stressed that this was down to Jones' poor form with the bat rather than his injury. Read took advantage of the opportunity with 38 in the first innings of the 3rd Test against Pakistan, and then completing his first Test half-century, shepherding the tail in the second innings whilst making 55, to add to a sharp performance (four catches and a stumping) behind the wickets. Despite finishing the summer as first choice, Read was passed over for a 12-month central contract for 2007 - the England selectors deciding to keep their options open by not contracting any wicket-keeper.

Prior to the first Test in the 2006-2007 England Ashes tour of Australia, Read was dropped in favour of Geraint Jones. England coach Duncan Fletcher said that Jones would be "a better prospect for batting at number seven". Notts Director of Cricket, Mick Newell, responded to Fletcher's decision by calling his selection "bizarre".

Read was selected to play for two tour matches for England between the Second and Third Tests. In the first, against Australia Chairman's XI, Read was dismissed for a duck. In the two-day match against Western Australia, Read scored 59 not out while Jones, playing as a batsman, went for a first ball duck. Under increased pressure, Jones retained his place for the third Test but failed to score in either innings - the first and second ducks of his Test career - leading to Read being selected for the fourth Test. Though he struggled with the bat in the final two Tests, he took 6 catches in the first innings of the fourth Test, becoming only the 3rd player in Test history to take 6 dismissals in an innings twice. Read repeated that performance with another 6 dismissals in the first innings of the 5th Test in Sydney, making him the first, and so far only, keeper in Test history to achieve the feat in successive Tests. For the subsequent one-day tournament, and the following World Cup, Read was overlooked for selection, with Paul Nixon taking over the wicketkeeper position. The following summer, the Test wicketkeeping position was given to Matt Prior, who scored a century on his Test debut and retained his place for the subsequent one-day matches.

== Career best performances ==
Updated 9 September 2010

	Batting			
	Score	Fixture	Venue	Season
Tests	55	England v Pakistan	Headingley	2006
ODI	30*	England v South Africa	Old Trafford	2003
T20I	13	England v Pakistan	Bristol	2006
FC	240	Nottinghamshire v Essex	Chelmsford	2007
LA	135	Nottinghamshire v Durham	Trent Bridge	2006
T20	58*	Nottinghamshire v Lancashire	Old Trafford	2009

Sporting positions
Preceded by Stephen Fleming	Nottinghamshire County cricket captain 2008–2017	Succeeded by Steven Mullaney
