= Derbyshire County Cricket Club in 2005 =

2005 season of an English cricket team

Derbyshire County Cricket Club seasons
2005 season
- Captain: Luke Sutton
- County Championship: Div 2 – 9
- totesport League: Div 2 – 5
- Cheltenham and Gloucester Trophy: R2
- Twenty20 Cup.: QF
- Most runs: Michael Di Venuto
- Most wickets: Graeme Welch
- Most catches: Luke Sutton

Derbyshire County Cricket Club in 2005 was the cricket season when the English club Derbyshire had been playing for one hundred and thirty-five years. They reached the semi-final in the Cheltenham and Gloucester Trophy. In the County Championship, they finished ninth in the second division and in the National League, they finished sixth in the second division. They were eliminated at group level in the North section of the Twenty20 Cup.

Derbyshire played 17 first class games in 2005, winning one, drawing eight and losing eight. In 21 List A matches, they won eleven, lost eight, tied one and had one no-result, while nine Twenty20 matches resulted in four wins, four losses and one no-result.

== Matches ==
=== First Class ===
List of matches
No.	Date	V	Result	Margin	Notes
1	13 Apr 2005	Worcestershire; County Ground, Derby	Lost	10 wickets	MJ Di Venuto 111; Batty 5–87
2	20 Apr 2005	Oxford University; The University Parks, Oxford	Drawn		J Moss 109
3	27 Apr 2005	Northamptonshire; County Ground, Derby	Drawn		Love 168; Shafayat 161;SD Stubbings 171; MJ Di Venuto 130; Louw 6–71
4	6 May 2005	Lancashire; Old Trafford, Manchester	Lost	Innings and 72 runs	Love 101; Law 112; AG Botha 6–104; Keedy 6–60
5	11 May 2005	Worcestershire; County Ground, New Road, Worcester	Lost	9 wickets	Moore 246
6	26 May 2005	Leicestershire; County Ground, Derby	Lost	4 wickets	Robinson 110
7	1 Jun 2005	Essex; The Ford County Ground, Chelmsford f48695	Drawn		G Welch 112 and 5–63; MJ Di Venuto 110; Bopara 105
8	15 Jun 2005	Lancashire; County Ground, Derby	Lost	1 wicket	Muralitharan 6–50
9	21 Jul 2005	Durham; County Ground, Derby	Drawn		Collingwood 190; MJ Di Venuto 203; Hassan Adnan 106
10	26 Jul 2005	Yorkshire; Headingley, Leeds	Drawn		McGrath 134; Jaques 219
11	4 Aug 2005	Somerset; County Ground, Derby	Lost	5 runs	Suppiah 123; Durston 146*; J Moss 106
12	10 Aug 2005	Northamptonshire; County Ground, Northampton	Lost	182 runs	Love 177; Brown 5–61
13	16 Aug 2005	Essex; County Ground, Derby	Lost	5 wickets	Flower 104; Kaneiria 6–111 and 5–65; G Welch 5–68
14	30 Aug 2005	Durham; Riverside Ground, Chester-le-Street	Drawn		Collingwood 113; Benkenstein 162; SD Stubbings 101; Hunter 5–63
15	8 Sep 2005	Leicestershire; Grace Road, Leicester	Drawn		Robinson 123; Ackerman 125
16	16 Sep 2005	Yorkshire; County Ground, Derby	Drawn		McGrath 158; Harvey 103 and 5–40; Lawson 5–155
17	21 Sep 2005	Somerset; County Ground, Taunton	Won	Innings and 18 runs	SD Stubbings 151; Hassan Adnan 191; Francis 108; Blackwell 107; G Welch 5–105

=== Championship table ===
2005 County Championship – Division Two
Pos	Team	Pld	W	D	L	Pen	Bat	Bowl	Pts
1	Lancashire	16	7	6	3	0	43	47	212
2	Durham	16	6	8	2	0	45	44	205
3	Yorkshire	16	5	10	1	0.5	49	42	200.5
4	Northamptonshire	16	5	8	3	0	45	46	193
5	Essex	16	5	7	4	0	51	36	185
6	Worcestershire	16	5	4	7	5.5	53	46	179.5
7	Leicestershire	16	3	7	6	0.5	45	45	159.5
8	Somerset	16	4	5	7	0	42	37	155
9	Derbyshire	16	1	7	8	0	31	43	116

=== totesport League ===
List of matches
No.	Date	V	Result	Margin	Notes
1	17 Apr 2005	Kent; County Ground, Derby	No result		
2	24 Apr 2005	Sussex; County Ground, Hove	Lost	2 runs	
3	20 May 2005	Warwickshire; County Ground, Derby	Lost	52 runs	
4	30 May 2005	Leicestershire; County Ground, Derby	Won	6 wickets	KJ Dean 5–45
5	5 Jun 2005	Kent; Mote Park, Maidstone	Won	90 runs	MJ Di Venuto 116
6	13 Jun 2005	Durham; Riverside Ground, Chester-le-Street	Lost	5 wickets	
7	19 Jun 2005	Scotland; County Ground, Derby	Tied		MJ Di Venuto 112
8	9 Jul 2005	Warwickshire; Edgbaston, Birmingham	Lost	5 wickets	
9	17 Jul 2005	Surrey; Kennington Oval	Won	5 wickets	
10	20 Jul 2005	Durham; County Ground, Derby	Lost	6 wickets	
11	3 Aug 2005	Somerset; County Ground, Derby	Won	15 runs	
12	14 Aug 2005	Sussex; County Ground, Derby	Won	3 runs	MJ Di Venuto 129
13	26 Aug 2005	Scotland; Grange Cricket Club Ground, Raeburn Place, Edinburgh	Won	3 wickets	
14	28 Aug 2005	Yorkshire; North Marine Road Ground, Scarborough	Won	5 wickets	
15	4 Sep 2005	Surrey; County Ground, Derby	Lost	8 wickets	
16	6 Sep 2005	Leicestershire; Grace Road, Leicester	Won	6 wickets	
17	14 Sep 2005	Yorkshire; County Ground, Derby	Won	5 wickets	
18	25 Sep 2005	Somerset; County Ground, Taunton	Lost	135 runs	

2005 totesport League – Division Two
Pos	Team	Pld	W	L	NR	T	Pts
1	Sussex Sharks	18	13	4	1	0	54
2	Durham Dynamos	18	12	4	2	0	52
3	Warwickshire Bears	18	10	6	2	0	44
4	Leicestershire Foxes	18	10	7	1	0	42
5	Derbyshire Phantoms	18	9	7	1	1	40
6	Somerset Sabres	18	9	8	1	0	38
7	Surrey Lions	18	7	10	1	0	30
8	Kent Spitfires	18	6	10	2	0	28
9	Yorkshire Phoenix	18	5	13	0	0	20
10	Scottish Saltires	18	2	14	1	1	12

=== Friends Provident Trophy ===
List of matches
No.	Date	V	Result	Margin	Notes
1st Rnd	4 May 2005	Durham; Riverside Ground, Chester-le-Street	Won	1 wicket	
2nd Rnd	17 May 2005	Kent; County Ground, Derby	Lost	127 runs	

=== Other List A matches ===
List of matches
No.	Date	V	Result	Margin	Notes
1	10 Jun 2005	Bangladesh; County Ground, Derby	Won	6 wickets	

=== Twenty20 Cup ===
List of matches
No.	Date	V	Result	Margin	Notes
1	22 Jun 2005	Durham; County Ground, Derby	Won	6 wickets	
2	24 Jun 2005	Leicestershire; County Ground, Derby	Won	7 wickets	
3	28 Jun 2005	Yorkshire; Headingley, Leeds	Lost	6 wickets	Harvey 109
4	29 Jun 2005	Lancashire; Old Trafford, Manchester	Lost	66 runs	
5	1 Jul 2005	Nottinghamshire; Trent Bridge, Nottingham	Won	4 wickets	
6	4 Jul 2005	Lancashire; County Ground, Derby	Lost	50 runs	
7	5 Jul 2005	Leicestershire; Grace Road, Leicester	Abandoned		
8	6 Jul 2005	Nottinghamshire; County Ground, Derby	Won	9 wickets	
Quarter Final	18 Jul 2005	Lancashire; Old Trafford, Manchester	Lost	17 runs	

2005 Twenty20 Cup – North Division
Team	M	W	L	NR	Pts	NRR
Lancashire Lightning	8	6	1	1	13	+1.77
Leicestershire Foxes	8	5	2	1	11	+0.25
Derbyshire Phantoms	8	4	3	1	9	-0.45
Yorkshire Phoenix	8	3	5	0	6	−0.70
Durham Dynamos	8	2	5	1	5	−0.87
Nottinghamshire Outlaws	8	2	6	0	4	+0.13

== Match details ==
=== April ===
Five games were played in April, and Derbyshire failed to win any of them – though one ended in a no-result and two in draws. Derbyshire began the season by picking up only 3 points in the opening Championship fixture whilst being defeated by Worcestershire, and rain then destroyed their first Sunday League match. They then went to the Parks to play the Oxford students – only to see the students take a confident first innings lead, although Jonathan Moss was able to score a century in the second innings and draw the game. Derbyshire then went to Hove in Sussex and lost by two runs in the Sunday League, before drawing with Northamptonshire in the County Championship.

==== County Championship: Derbyshire v Worcestershire (13–16 April) ====
Worcestershire (21pts) beat Derbyshire (3pts) by 10 wickets

At Derby, Worcestershire won the toss and chose to bat. Stephen Moore was run out early for 19. He held his pose, showing off his defensive shot during an appeal for leg before wicket, as Jonathan Moss came in on the blind side and threw the ball at the stumps. The other opener, Stephen Peters, stayed around though, and made 55. Once Moore was out, Peters was joined by Graeme Hick, who was given lives on 8 and 57, and made 80 off 119 balls before finally being lbw for 80 off one that kept low. Vikram Solanki then went for a duck, but Worcestershire still made 305 for 6 at the close.

Worcestershire kept batting on the second day, before declaring after winning their fourth bonus point on 350 for 9. Derbyshire's batting saw no-one pass 30 as their first innings ended on 135 all out, 215 behind. Matthew Mason, who took two wickets with a bowling analysis of 10–6–6–2, Alamgir Sheriyar and David Wigley, who took three each, were the main contributors with ball in hand for Worcester. The follow-on was enforced, and Derbyshire were 10 for 0 when stumps were drawn on day two.

Only 74 overs were bowled on the third day, with rain ending play at tea. Michael di Venuto put up the Derbyshire resistance, scoring 111 in an innings that included 12 fours and one six before finally being stumped off Gareth Batty. Steve Stubbings played the anchor role, and had made only 33 when the first wicket fell for 150. Batty bowled unchanged for a 32 over spell as Sheriyar and Wigley tried, and failed, to get di Venuto. Once he was gone, there was a flurry of wickets to 175 for 4. At close Derbyshire were within sight of a draw, being 11 runs behind with six wickets remaining.

Gareth Batty increased his second innings tally to 5 for 87 to dismiss Derbyshire early on the fourth day, as Stubbings' innings ended with just 10 added to the previous day's score for a total of 58. By the time they were all out for 285, Derbyshire had set a target of just 71 in 68 overs. It took them only 14 as Peters and Moore won the match for them by 10 wickets. It was an easy victory for Worcestershire in the end, helped by Derbyshire dropping six catches along the way. Worcester coach Tom Moody said, "We haven't got our overseas players here but this was a good example of the depth of our squad. To have a successful season, you need players who can come in and stand up and be counted and they've done that. The game proved that catches win matches with Derbyshire dropping six while Worcestershire hardly missed an opportunity. We were let off the hook a bit in the first innings with some dropped chances but our catching was exceptional, particularly with the conditions being so cold. I think the cold weather was the hardest thing for Gareth [Batty] because it's difficult for a spinner to get his hands warm and grip the ball." (Cricinfo scorecard)

==== National League: Derbyshire v Kent (17 April) ====
Match abandoned – Derbyshire (2pts), Kent (2pts)

Derbyshire, playing for the first time as the "Phantoms" lost the toss and were put in to bat at Derby. Opener Jonathan Moss made free at the start of the innings with 79 off 81 balls before he was bowled by Robert Ferley. His teammates struggled, with only captain Luke Sutton, with 46, adding any significant amount to the score, and Derbyshire scored 197 for 8 in their 45 overs. Only 5 overs of Kent Spitfires' innings were possible, in which time they made 9 for no loss. Rain then meant the match was abandoned. (BBC scorecard)

==== MCC University Match: Oxford UCCE v Derbyshire (20–22 April) ====
Match drawn

Derbyshire were unchanged from their first Championship match, and the first day at the Parks left them at 225 for 8 at close. After recent rain in Oxford, and with a swinging ball in hand, the Oxford UCCE bowlers were commendably accurate. If 2 or 3 more catches had been taken, the scoreline would have looked even more impressive for the students.

On the second day, after Derbyshire moved to 246 all out, Luke Parker, a Warwickshire signing, scored 89 to help Oxford to 245 for 5, just one run behind Derbyshire. The third day saw Oxford UCCE consolidate their lead, and they were finally all out for 372, a lead of 126. The student bowlers were not up to the task of dismissing Derbyshire a second time in the 53 overs that remained, but Jonathan Moss scored 109 not out, with the game ending when the visitors declared on 226 for 2. (Cricinfo scorecard)

==== National League: Sussex v Derbyshire (24 April) ====
Sussex (4pts) beat Derbyshire (0pts) by two runs (D/L method)

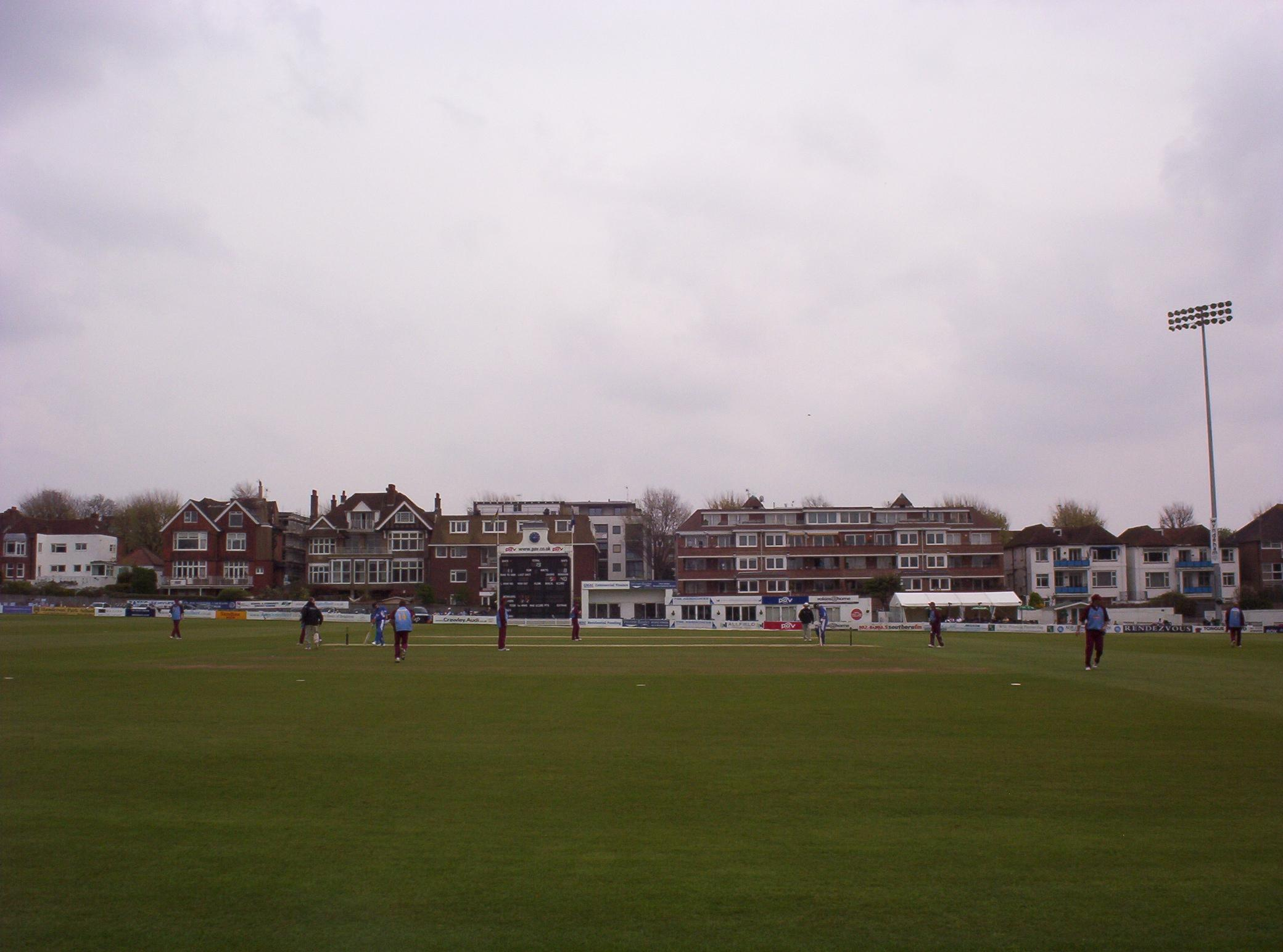
Derbyshire batting at Hove

A close game at Hove saw the Sharks defeat the Phantoms by two runs, after Tom Lungley went for, and failed to get, a six of the last ball to win the game. It was a high scoring affair, and halfway through their overs Sussex looked on target for a big total approaching 300, after adding 178 for the first three wickets. However, Derbyshire did well to peg them back to 254 to 8.

Rain delayed the start of the second innings, and left the Phantoms with 205 to win off 32 overs. They were always behind par, but never quite gave up. Indeed, Graeme Welch nearly won it for them with 42 off 24 balls, which included three huge sixes. However, wickets tumbled, leaving Tom Lungley with the last ball to score six. To his credit, he went for it and could have won, but the ball fell short of the boundary and he was run out. (Cricinfo scorecard)

==== County Championship: Derbyshire v Northamptonshire (27–30 April) ====
Northamptonshire (12pts) drew with Derbyshire (6pts)

Northamptonshire batted first at Derby against last-placed Derbyshire, and openers Bilal Shafayat and Martin Love finished the day without loss, though Derbyshire dropped them both. Shafayat finished the first day unbeaten on a career-best 156 from 267 balls; Love was on 129 off 233 balls; Northants were on 292.

Shafayat added only 5 to his overnight score before being lbw, but Love went on to 168, and Northamptonshire finally declared on 451 for 7. In reply, Derbyshire regularly lost wickets, finishing the second day on 135 for 4. On the third day, Johann Louw completed a haul of 6 for 71 and forced them to follow on 210 in arrears. However, Derbyshire fared much better in their second innings – with both openers undefeated and their score on 119, 91 behind with one day to play. Rain then wiped out the final day's play, leaving Derbyshire at the bottom of the table despite the six points earned. (BBC scorecard)

=== May ===
May saw Derbyshire record their first victory, as they edged into the Second Round of the C&G Trophy by defeating Durham on the last ball with one wicket to spare. However, five successive losses followed. First, they were defeated by an innings and 72 runs by Lancashire in the County Championship, and five days later they suffered a nine-wicket loss to Worcestershire. On 17 May they lost by 127 runs to Kent in the Second Round of the C&G Trophy, and the one-day League loss three days later to Warwickshire was their fourth in succession. May was rounded off with two matches at home against Leicestershire – the Championship encounter was lost, but they ended May on the same way as they had begun it, with a win.

==== C&G Trophy Round One: Durham v Derbyshire (4–5 May) ====
Derbyshire beat Durham by one wicket to progress to Round Two of the C&G Trophy

Durham put on 234 in their 50 overs at Chester-le-Street, mostly thanks Paul Collingwood, who scored 82 from 83 balls. Derbyshire's Spin bowler Ant Botha took four for 44 from his ten overs, with three men caught. In reply, England Test bowler Steve Harmison took three for 45, including trapping Michael Di Venuto lbw with his third ball and Hassan Adnan caught at first slip. Derbyshire, who were unchanged for the third game running, lost their first three wickets for 54, but their innings was anchored by Chris Bassano who made 57 from 104 balls. This, along with 50 from Graeme Welch, kept Derbyshire in the game, but it needed a tenth wicket partnership of 16 between Botha and Kevin Dean to see them through on the last ball of the game. (Cricinfo scorecard)

==== County Championship: Lancashire v Derbyshire (6–9 May) ====
Lancashire (22pts) beat Derbyshire (3pts) by an innings and 72 runs

Derbyshire, who had replaced pace bowler Kevin Dean with Andy Gray, batted first at Old Trafford, and were dismissed for 215, with Luke Sutton top-scoring with 95. No one else passed 40, however. James Anderson took 4 for 62, and was the pick of the Lancashire bowlers. In reply, Lancashire made 65 for no loss at stumps on the first day.

Lancashire continued their dominance on the second day, although only 40 overs were possible as they progressed to 175 for 1. The third day saw them finally dismissed for 469, with Mal Loye (101) and Stuart Law (112) making centuries. By close Derbyshire had progressed to 81 for 1, leaving them at least the possibility of a draw. However, that wasn't to be as they lost their last nine wickets for 101, leaving them 72 runs short of making Lancashire bat again. Spin bowler Gary Keedy had the best bowling figures, taking 6 for 60, while Muttiah Muralitharan bowled 17 maiden overs in a 26-over effort. (Cricinfo scorecard)

==== County Championship: Worcestershire v Derbyshire (11–14 May) ====
Worcestershire (22pts) beat Derbyshire (5pts) by 9 wickets

Worcestershire's Stephen Moore dominated the first innings, making 246 as they climbed to 478. The score would have been a lot smaller if it weren't for Jamie Pipe, who came in with the score on 300 for 8 and put on 80, sharing a 173-run stand with Moore – eight short of the county ninth-wicket record from 1907. In reply Derbyshire were bowled out for 263, with no player making a half-century. The follow-on was enforced and Derbyshire did do better, but their 314 set Worcester a target of 100. Ian Hunter got an early wicket, as Worcestershire were four for 1, but Moore and Hick added 96 and Worcestershire won by nine wickets. Derbyshire's second innings included 7 lbws. (Cricinfo scorecard)

==== C&G Trophy Round Two: Derbyshire v Kent (17 May) ====
Kent beat Derbyshire by 127 runs to progress to the Quarter-Finals of the C&G Trophy

At Derby, Derbyshire won the toss and chose to field against Kent, who scored 257 for 4 after double-figure contributions from the entire top order, and four men made their way past 40. Geraint Jones top-scored with 70, while Derbyshire's South African all-rounder Ant Botha took three for 40 with his left-arm spin to take his wicket count to 10 in his last three List A games. Martin Saggers (three for 21), Amjad Khan (one for 12) and Simon Cook (one for 22) then reduced Derbyshire to 27 for 5, and although the last five wickets added 103 runs after 41 from Sutton, it was not enough to chase the target of 258. (Cricinfo scorecard)

==== National League: Derbyshire v Warwickshire (20 May) ====
Warwickshire (4pts) beat Derbyshire (0pts) by 52 runs

Derbyshire Phantoms got their fourth loss in two weeks at Derby after Warwickshire Bears raced past 200 for the loss of two wickets, with Nick Knight and Jim Troughton making half-centuries. Although six wickets fell in the last 10 overs, they still made 260, with Troughton's innings ended on 73. In reply, Derbyshire had one partnership above 50 with six men reaching double figures. However, Jonathan Moss was the only one to pass 30 with his 65, and the hosts were all out for 208. (Cricinfo scorecard)

==== County Championship: Derbyshire v Leicestershire (26–29 May) ====
Leicestershire (19pts) beat Derbyshire (5pts) by four wickets

Derbyshire batted for a day to make 251 in the first innings at Derby as only Australian Michael Di Venuto stood tall against the Leicestershire bowling, scoring 76. Eventually, Derbyshire declared on 251 for 9, as wickets were spread about evenly. Leicestershire replied with an opening partnership of 85, and a half-century from Dinesh Mongia took them to 188 for 2. But Graeme Welch took four for 48 as the last eight wickets fell for 91 runs, with only Darren Robinson's gritty four-hour 110 and David Masters quickfire 25 giving Leicestershire a lead. The Derbyshire reply was equally gritty, as 112 overs of cricket yielded only 259 runs, with di Venuto scoring 73 runs in a little less than five hours – only Charl Willoughby took wickets in the first two sessions for Leicestershire, as Derbyshire made it to 160 for 1 before Willoughby had di Venuto lbw. Derbyshire finished their second innings on 285 five overs into the fourth morning, setting a target of 258, and Derbyshire dug out three early wickets for 48 runs. But 47 from Mongia along with half-centuries from HD Ackerman and John Sadler saw to it that Leicestershire made it to their target of 258 for the loss of six wickets. (Cricinfo scorecard)

==== National League: Derbyshire v Leicestershire (30 May) ====
Derbyshire (4pts) beat Leicestershire by 6 wickets

Derbyshire's Kevin Dean took five for 45 in his first match since the C&G Trophy first round tie against Durham on 5 May. Without Dean, Derbyshire had lost five consecutive matches, but his return helped reduce Leicestershire Foxes to 55 for 6 at the end of the fifteenth over at Derby. John Sadler came in and made 50 before he was stumped off Ant Botha's bowling, but the remainder of the batting order could only make 41 as Leicestershire made 146 all out. Derbyshire did not score at a rate much quicker than the required three an over, but still made their target with four wickets down and 21 balls to go, as Michael di Venuto top-scored with 48. The win saw Derbyshire past Leicestershire to go eighth in the table, two points ahead of the Foxes. (Cricinfo scorecard)

=== June ===
After five losses and then a win to end May, June saw Derbyshire stretch their unbeaten streak to two as Derbyshire drew against Essex. Derbyshire had the chance to get their first Championship win of the season, as they earned a 142-run first innings lead, but left their opponents with two sessions to chase 379, and Essex survived for the draw. Two one-day wins followed, over Kent and the touring Bangladeshis, but on 13 June they posted 82 all out against Durham to lose by five wickets. Derbyshire came ever closer to the elusive Championship win, however, as Lancashire eked through by one wicket in the last match before the end of the spring season. The final match before Twenty20 set in was a National League game with the Scottish amateurs, and the teams tied that game.

==== County Championship: Essex v Derbyshire (1–4 June) ====
Derbyshire (11pts) drew with Essex (9pts)

Derbyshire batted first at Chelmsford, and they put on 462 with Steve Stubbings making 92 and Graeme Welch 112. Essex lost quick wickets in reply, going to 34 for 4, but then Ronnie Irani, James Foster and James Middlebrook all made half-centuries as the hosts made 320. Derbyshire, who were without a win all season, declared at lunchtime on the fourth day, at 236 for 3 from 63 overs, with Michael Di Venuto making 110. A half-century from Alastair Cook and a maiden first-class century from Ravinder Bopara saw Essex through to the draw on 245 for 5, well short of their theoretical target of 379. (Cricinfo scorecard)

==== National League: Kent v Derbyshire (5 June) ====
Derbyshire (4pts) beat Kent (0pts) by 90 runs

Derbyshire Phantoms came to Maidstone and Kent Spitfires with only one win in their first four National League games, while Kent were fifth in the table after two wins in five. Kent captain David Fulton won the toss and chose to field, and Derbyshire's Australian opener Michael di Venuto then hit an 80-ball century with twelve fours and a six. In the end, he was out for 116 off 90 balls, but when everyone else hit at nearly a run a ball and Kent could only take three wickets, Derbyshire made a total 304 for 3. Kent had Andrew Hall, who made 61 from the top of the order, but despite quick late order hitting from Justin Kemp (27) and Amjad Khan (33), Kent ended all out for 214, 91 runs short with 38 balls remaining. (Cricinfo scorecard)

==== Tour Match: Derbyshire v Bangladeshis (10 June) ====
Derbyshire beat the Bangladeshis by six wickets

Derbyshire beat the Bangladeshis with more than 10 overs to spare in a day-night match at Derby. The Bangladeshis won the toss and chose to bat first against a Derbyshire side that had made two changes from the National League game with Kent – the injured Michael di Venuto and Tim Lungley was left out for Nick Walker and Graeme Welch. When Javed Omar, Nafees Iqbal and Rajin Saleh were out in single figures the tourists fell to 19 for 3. Tushar Imran and Habibul Bashar then put on 80 for the fourth wicket, a partnership that included two sixes from Tushar Imran, but the Bangladeshis could not stretch any partnership past 30 following that, and they were all out for 189 with 3.5 overs to spare. Bangladesh's bowling, which had taken six wickets in the two Tests with England, took four wickets in Derbyshire's innings – including Walker, who had been promoted to opener with a List A average of 10.10 – but Jonathan Moss's 72 helped the hosts home with 11.5 overs and six wickets to spare. (Cricinfo scorecard)

==== National League: Durham v Derbyshire (13 June) ====
Durham (4pts) beat Derbyshire (0pts) by five wickets

Derbyshire Phantoms posted their lowest score of the season with 82 all out after being put in to bowl at the Riverside Ground, and Durham Dynamos took their fifth victory in eight matches in the National League. Dale Benkenstein took four for 17, including two wickets in his first over, and Australian Ashley Noffke showed good bowling form with three for 16 and three maidens in seven overs. Durham's first four wickets fell for 36, with Kevin Dean grabbing two, but Gordon Muchall (26 off 61 balls) and Gary Pratt (23 off 48) added 40 for the fifth wicket to send Durham to a five-wicket win with just under 10 overs to spare. (Cricinfo scorecard)

==== County Championship: Derbyshire v Lancashire (15–17 June) ====
Lancashire (18pts) beat Derbyshire (3pts) by one wicket

In a low-scoring match which came down to the last wicket at The County Ground, Derby, Dominic Cork had the pleasure of beating his old county, as Derbyshire failed to break their duck of wins that had been going since July 2004. Winning the toss and batting, Derbyshire saw Australian Michael di Venuto and Ben France joined up for an opening stand of 56 – the second highest partnership of the match. Then, Glen Chapple dug out both openers, as Derbyshire lost the next three wickets for 15. Chapple had bowling figures of 19–10–29–3, as his spell had the lowest economy rate in the match. However, it was Cork who got the most wickets, after taking the last three of the innings to finish with four for 40 and send Derbyshire off for 191. Lancashire lost two wickets for 12 runs in reply, and despite 37 from Brad Hodge they were at 128 for 6, but Cork's 64 from number eight in the batting order – the highest innings of the match – along with 24 from Muttiah Muralitharan – took Lancashire to a 50-run lead. Muralitharan then bowled 27 consecutive second-innings overs, taking six for 50 as Derbyshire made 185, setting a target of 136 to win. Iain Sutcliffe and Mal Loye added 53 for Lancashire's second wicket, but they then lost seven men for sub-12 scores and fell to 131 for 9. However, Sutcliffe was not stirred as he completed his innings of 62 not out, adding the required five runs with Muralitharan. (Cricinfo scorecard)

==== National League: Derbyshire v Scotland (19 June) ====
Derbyshire (2pts) tied with Scotland (2pts)

The first – and only – tie of the National League season was played out at The County Ground, Derby between Derbyshire Phantoms and Scottish Saltires. The hosts won the toss and batted, and with the help of a century from Australian import Michael di Venuto they ended up with a final total of 220 for 8 – along with 33 not out from Andre Botha. Five batsmen were out in single figures, however. Kevin Dean took three early wickets to reduce the Scots to 31 for 3, but Douglas Lockhart made his highest career score with 88 not out to set Scotland back on track. On the last ball, Scotland needed two runs to win with South African-born number 11 Dewald Nel on strike – he could only scamper a single, and the teams shared the spoils. (Cricinfo scorecard)

=== Twenty20 Cup – Group Stage ===
For Derbyshire, the Twenty20 Cup began with two victories over Durham and Leicestershire, as both teams were defeated by chasing totals less than 140. They never managed any sustained streak of results, though, and they required a win against Nottinghamshire and that Essex did not beat Kent if they were to proceed to the quarter-finals. Both happened, and Derbyshire went through to the quarter-final – where they would meet Lancashire for the fourth time in a month, having lost all three previous encounters.

==== Derbyshire v Durham (22 June) ====
Derbyshire (2pts) beat Durham (0pts) by six wickets

Durham Dynamos had lost two of 17 League and Championship games before they entered the Twenty20 game, while Derbyshire Phantoms had won two from 14. Nevertheless, the Phantoms recorded a victory with fourteen balls to spare against a Durham team lacking batsmen Paul Collingwood and Michael Hussey. Batting first, Durham made 130 for 7, Kevin Dean taking two for 20 and Andre Botha two for 16, both from a full quota of four overs. Gordon Muchall was the only batsman to pass 20 for the Dynamos. In reply, James Bryant top-scored with 53 not out off 46 balls, Jonathan Moss slashed eight boundaries in his 46, and two fours and a two from Botha sent them to 134 for 4 with 14 balls to spare with only Nathan Astle conceding less than six an over, taking two for 14. (Cricinfo scorecard)

==== Derbyshire v Leicestershire (24 June) ====
Derbyshire (2pts) beat Leicestershire (0pts) by seven wickets (D/L method)

Derbyshire Phantoms beat last year's champions Leicestershire Foxes at The County Ground, Derby to be the only side with two victories in the North Division of the Twenty20 Cup. Leicestershire lost their first two wickets for 15, and after HD Ackerman and Joe Sadler had added 54, the Leicestershire batsmen were removed Ian Hunter (three for 32), Ant Botha (two for 19) and Andy Gray (two for 21). Leicestershire's last man, Claude Henderson, was caught on the last ball, and his team all out for 137. Derbyshire's reply was shortened by rain, and they only got 14 overs to hit 103, and two wickets from David Masters set them back to 44 for 3. However, 42 from Luke Sutton in a 61-run stand with Botha ensured that Derbyshire made it to the target with seven balls to spare. (Cricinfo scorecard)

==== Yorkshire v Derbyshire (28 June) ====
Yorkshire (2pts) beat Derbyshire (0pts) by six wickets

The game at Headingley saw both sides score at run-rates in excess of 9. Derbyshire Phantoms batted first, with Jonathan Moss notching up 83 off 44 balls, and England Test bowler Matthew Hoggard was hit for 45 runs in three overs. Tim Bresnan, however, doubled his wicket count in the short format this season, as he took three for 26 in four overs. In reply, Yorkshire Phoenix reaped the benefits of a 124-run partnership between Australians Ian Harvey (who made 109, the first Twenty20 century of the season) and Phil Jaques. Michael Lumb and Bresnan then kept the run rate up, and Yorkshire reached 198 for 4 with an over left in the game to clinch victory. (Cricinfo scorecard)

==== Lancashire v Derbyshire (29 June) ====
Lancashire (2pts) beat Derbyshire (0pts) by 66 runs

Brad Hodge and 23 wides gave Lancashire Lightning a total of 164 for 8 against Derbyshire Phantoms, despite Kevin Dean's spell of one for 16 from four overs. Hodge made 44 off 34 balls, and Dominic Cork – promoted to five – made 28, the only ones to pass 20 for Lancashire. Hodge, who then came on as fourth change bowler, took four wickets for 17 runs to help bowl Derbyshire out for 98. (Inningsbreak scorecard)

==== Nottinghamshire v Derbyshire (1 July) ====
Derbyshire (2pts) beat Nottinghamshire (0pts) by four wickets

Derbyshire Phantoms needed to win to have a chance of qualifying for the quarter-finals – and did it, in a last-over finish. Nottinghamshire Outlaws batted first, and Will Smith and Chris Read made 51 and 44 not out respectively. The two where the only two Nottinghamshire batsmen to pass 20, and their contributions lifted the hosts to 147 for 8. Michael di Venuto and Luke Sutton took Derbyshire to 92 for 1 before Mark Ealham and Samit Patel chipped away at Derbyshire's batting. Four of Nottinghamshire's bowlers conceded less than 7 an over – which would have been good enough. However, Greg Smith conceded 40 runs, captain Sutton anchored the chase with 61 not out in 54 balls as Derbyshire won with two balls to spare. (Cricinfo scorecard)

==== Derbyshire v Lancashire (4 July) ====
Lancashire (2pts) beat Derbyshire (0pts) by 50 runs (D/L method)

Half-centuries from Stuart Law (67) and Brad Hodge (90 not out) helped Lancashire Lightning to 205 for 2 at The County Ground, Derby, with medium-pacer Ian Hunter taking both wickets. Law and Hodge shared a 154-run stand for the second wicket. Two wickets from Lancashire's opening bowler, England ODI player James Anderson, pegged Derbyshire Phantoms back to 16 for 2, and Brad Hodge took four for 27 – his second Twenty20 four-wicket-haul of the season – to reduce Derbyshire to 106 for 7, before rain intervened with 5.3 overs left in the game. The rain never relented, and it was calculated that Derbyshire's par score was 156, thus Lancashire took a 50-run victory. The victory meant that Lancashire qualified for the quarter-finals with one game to spare. (Cricinfo scorecard)

==== Leicestershire v Derbyshire (5 July) ====
Match abandoned; Leicestershire (1pt), Derbyshire (1pt)

No play was possible at Grace Road due to rain, but Leicestershire Foxes moved one step closer to the second place that guaranteed a quarter-final – the no-result meant that they were still two points ahead of Derbyshire Phantoms in third place, and dominating on net run rate. (Cricinfo scorecard)

==== Derbyshire v Nottinghamshire (6 July) ====
Derbyshire (2pts) beat Nottinghamshire (0pts) by nine wickets

Nottinghamshire Outlaws were limited to 139 for 5 by economical Derbyshire Phantoms bowling – which allowed them to take singles and not much more at Derby. Only ten boundaries were hit during Nottinghamshire's innings, all in fours, and Chris Read – who had a Twenty20 strike rate of 129.12 during the season – was limited to 29 off 31 balls. The Derbyshire reply was spearheaded by Michael di Venuto who made an unbeaten 77 and added 92 with Jonathan Moss for the second wicket. Derbyshire passed their target with nine wickets and 20 balls in hand, and the victory gave them a quarter-final berth. (Cricinfo scorecard)

=== July ===
Back in the league competitions, Derbyshire lost to Warwickshire in the National League, but they got a win on the next week-end as they beat Surrey at the Oval. The following day, Lancashire beat them for the fourth time in a month, a 17-run loss which saw them knocked out of the Twenty20 Cup. Two days later, they lost a floodlit League match to Durham by six wickets, before drawing with the same team in the Championship to remain rock-bottom. Their next match was also a draw, a Championship game against Yorkshire.

==== National League: Warwickshire v Derbyshire (9 July) ====
Warwickshire (4pts) beat Derbyshire (0pts) by five wickets

Warwickshire Bears took a five-wicket win in the last over at Edgbaston thanks to good bowling and a quickfire innings from wicket-keeper Trevor Penney. Derbyshire Phantoms batted first, losing wickets regularly, as no partnership reached 50, and only Steve Stubbings making over 25 with his 108-ball 69. Neil Carter took three for 28, and got the best bowling figures, and four of six Warwickshire bowlers took wickets as Derbyshire posted 201 for 9. Wickets from Jonathan Moss – who ended with three for 32 – helped set them back to 117 for 4 and 167 for 5, but Jonathan Trott and Trevor Penney added 38 for the sixth wicket, and Warwickshire passed the target with five balls to spare. (Cricinfo scorecard)

==== National League: Surrey v Derbyshire (17 July) ====
Derbyshire (4pts) beat Surrey (0pts) by five wickets

Surrey Lions made 260 for 8 at the Oval, and still lost. The men from batting from one to four all passed 35, but no one made fifty, and a quickfire 29 from spinner Nayan Doshi which led to a defendable total of 260 for 8. However, Steve Stubbings and Michael di Venuto took 27 boundaries together, including two sixes from Stubbings, and the boundaries were worth 112 of the two's 196 runs. To add to that, Surrey bowled 24 extras, so the stand between di Venuto and Stubbings had yielded 217 runs before Mohammad Akram broke through their defences, as both were dismissed two runs short of a century. Their number three, Jonathan Moss made 22 not out to guide Derbyshire Phantoms to a total of 264 for 5 with nearly six overs remaining. (Cricinfo scorecard)

==== Twenty20 Cup Quarter-Final: Lancashire v Derbyshire (18 July) ====
Lancashire beat Derbyshire by 17 runs to progress to the Semi-Finals of the Twenty20 Cup

Partly due to Mal Loye's boundary-filled 73, off just 32 balls, Derbyshire Phantoms conceded 189 runs in their game with Lancashire Lightning at Old Trafford. After Loye was dismissed, Lancashire tried to employ pinch hitters such as Dominic Cork and Glen Chapple to get the runs flowing quickly, who hit at just over a run a ball – but still below the average run rate for the innings. Derbyshire made it to 121 for 3 despite Gary Keedy taking the wickets of Michael di Venuto and Jonathan Moss early on, but Keedy dug out another wicket, and that set the doors in the Old Trafford pavilion in motion. Derbyshire lost five wickets for 18 runs, part-time off-spinner Andrew Crook joining in with Keedy to grab two for 35. Derbyshire needed some big hits from the specialist bowlers in the end, and despite four boundaries and 25 from Tim Lungley they were bowled out for 172 with three balls remaining, James Anderson getting the honour of taking the last wicket. (Cricinfo scorecard)

==== National League: Derbyshire v Durham (20 July) ====
Durham (4pts) beat Derbyshire (0pts) by six wickets

Derbyshire Phantoms were set back initially by three wickets from 22-year-old Graham Onions and that prevented them running away to a score higher than their eventual 223 for 8. Travis Friend made 52 and Graeme Welch only taking 24 balls for his unbeaten 37. After opener Nicky Peng had been dismissed for 15 off 29 balls, Durham Dynamos were guided to the target by 97 from Michael Hussey and 70 from Gordon Muchall. An extra won them the game with eight balls to spare. Four Derbyshire bowlers got one wicket each, but all at a cost of more than 28 runs. (Cricinfo scorecard)

==== County Championship: Derbyshire v Durham (21–24 July) ====
Durham (11pts) drew with Derbyshire (7pts)

Paul Collingwood made a first-innings 190 – 52% of the Durham total – on his return to County Championship cricket following his stint with the England ODI team in the NatWest Series. However, Derbyshire's second highest score of the season, and rain cutting off about 80 overs of the match, resulted in the match in a draw. The hosts had taken three early Durham wickets for 59 after being put in the field, but Collingwood and skipper Dale Benkenstein lifted Durham with a 250-run partnership – to 309 for 4. However, Derbyshire did get some kind of revenge – five wickets fell for nine runs by the end of the day, as Durham were 363 for 9 at stumps, and only eight runs were taken before the last wicket fell on the second day. Durham took wickets as well, though, as Mark Davies got three wickets for four runs, including Michael di Venuto for 32, and Liam Plunkett also took three wickets as Derbyshire made 161 in 41.1 overs.

Asked to follow on, di Venuto took 113 balls for his second-innings century, but batted more slowly after that as Derbyshire began to build a lead with a 252-run stand between di Venuto and Hassan Adnan. A brief spurt of wickets, initiated by di Venuto departing for 203, saw Durham lose four men for six runs to go to 360 for 6, but Travis Friend and Graeme Welch made 135 in a seventh-wicket partnership as Derbyshire set a target of 330. After Durham had batted out 36 of their 66 overs, scoring 93 runs and losing two wickets to spinner Ant Botha, play was stopped and the match declared a draw due to poor weather conditions. (Cricinfo scorecard)

==== County Championship: Yorkshire v Derbyshire (26–29 July) ====
Yorkshire (12pts) drew with Derbyshire (11pts)

Phil Jaques and Anthony McGrath lifted Yorkshire to a total of 570 with a third-wicket partnership of 310, 13 off the county record set in 1928. Jaques totalled 219, Yorkshire's highest score of the season, while Derbyshire spinners Ant Botha and Andy Gray got three wickets each towards the end. Former England all-rounder Craig White was left stranded on 67 not out with the lower-order making insignificant contributions. However, Chris Silverwood and Richard Dawson chipped away at the Derbyshire batting line-up, taking three wickets each – but still, seven Derbyshire batsmen passed 30, and Michael di Venuto (79) and Jonathan Moss (52) making half-centuries in an innings that lasted for nearly two days due to the third day's play being rained off. Derbyshire followed on after making a total of 350, and despite Deon Kruis snaring two early wickets in the follow on, Derbyshire survived 60 last-day overs to make 173 for 5 at the end of day four and secure a draw. (Cricinfo scorecard)

=== August ===
August was a contrasting month for Derbyshire – their three Championship matches all ended in losses, against Somerset (by five runs), Northamptonshire and Essex. Just like in the previous encounter with Essex, Derbyshire racked up a first-innings lead, but this time they lost. However, despite the poor Championship form, they won all four National League matches – against Somerset, league leaders Sussex Sharks, Scottish Saltires and finally Yorkshire Phoenix to be two points off the promotion spot at the end of August.

==== National League: Derbyshire v Somerset (3 August) ====
Derbyshire (4pts) beat Somerset (0pts) by 15 runs

Derbyshire Phantoms jumped into fifth in the National League table thanks to their win over Somerset Sabres, who conceded more than 260 in 45 overs for the second time in that week. Michael di Venuto hit 11 fours on his way to 87, and despite two maiden overs from Andy Caddick, Derbyshire made 277 for 5. Wicket-keeper Carl Gazzard and Malaysian Arul Suppiah added 125 for the second wicket for Somerset, but the off breaks of Jonathan Moss and Andy Gray yielded seven wickets. That, along with a run out, saw Somerset to 241 for 9 before William Durston made 24 not out off 18 balls to see Somerset to the end of 45 overs – still 16 runs short of victory. (Cricinfo scorecard)

==== County Championship: Derbyshire v Somerset (4–7 August) ====
Somerset (21pts) beat Derbyshire (7pts) by five runs

Arul Suppiah, James Hildreth and Wesley Durston hit 49 boundaries as Somerset posted a first-innings total of 460 in a close match against Derbyshire. Suppiah passed fifty for the first time in his first-class career with a five-hour 123, while Durston was stranded on 146 not out – his only century of the season. Graeme Welch took four for 82 to get the best bowling figures for Derbyshire. However, Derbyshire's tactic of slow attrition worked well against Somerset's frontline bowlers Andy Caddick and Ian Blackwell. They made 438, in a total of 149 overs, before declaring with eight men down – four Derbyshire batsmen making fifties, Ant Botha top-scoring with 91, while 40 overs from Caddick yielded four for 102. Botha added 170 in an eighth-wicket partnership with Welch. Somerset then made 61 in 32 third-day overs, building a lead of 83 with nine wickets in hand.

After a third day with 281 runs and four wickets, the fourth day yielded 426 runs and enough wickets fell to get a result. Blackwell hit 88 not out in 85 balls as Somerset added 184 in the first fifty overs of the day before declaring, which set Derbyshire 268 to win in 50 overs – a one-day chase. Derbyshire attempted the chase, Jonathan Moss hitting 106 off 88 balls and adding runs with Luke Sutton (19), Steve Stubbings (55) and Hassan Adnan (48), as Derbyshire made their way to 247 for 4. However, two run-outs and two wickets each for Blackwell and Caddick saw Derbyshire lose their last six men for 15 runs, and Somerset t a five-run win. (Cricinfo scorecard)

==== County Championship: Northamptonshire v Derbyshire (10–13 August) ====
Northamptonshire (17pts) beat Derbyshire (4pts) by 182 runs

Northamptonshire won the match at The County Ground, Northampton after making a total of 140 in the first innings. Derbyshire's medium-pacer Ian Hunter took four for 50 to get the best figures for Derbyshire, dismissing three Northamptonshire batsmen in single figures. Graeme Welch chipped in by conceding 21 runs in ten overs and claiming three scalps. Steve Stubbings and Michael di Venuto then shared an opening partnership of 81, but two wickets from Johann Louw evened out the game somewhat, and Monty Panesar wrapped up Derbyshire's innings with three wickets on the second day, as Derbyshire were bowled out for 219.

After Welch's bowling had yielded two early catches to see Northamptonshire to 43 for 2, Australian Martin Love took centre stage. He hit 34 fours in 177 – an innings lasting from lunch on day two until the morning session on day three, and with a higher number of runs than the entire Northamptonshire first innings total. Usman Afzaal added 59 from number four as well, and half-centuries from David Sales and Riki Wessels, ensured that Northamptonshire could declare with a lead of 388, giving themselves five sessions to win the game. Welch got no further wicket, but conceded 63 runs, while spinner Andy Gray got two wickets but at a cost of 65 runs per wicket. The weather forecast for the final day, however, had predicted rain, so Northamptonshire wanted to get wickets early. Spinners Jason Brown and Monty Panesar shared nine wickets on the third day, while Derbyshire made 204 from 99 overs (di Venuto and Welch both scoring 47), but Australian Damien Wright wrapped up the innings by having Hunter bowled two balls into the fourth morning. (Cricinfo scorecard)

==== National League: Derbyshire v Sussex (14 August) ====
Derbyshire (4pts) beat Sussex (0pts) by three runs

Michael di Venuto made 129 not out, his third one-day century this season, to lift Derbyshire Phantoms to a final score of 232 for 3, which would turn out to be just enough to win the game. Sussex Sharks were looking to win and open a gap at the top of the league, and with ten runs needed, the Sharks had three wickets in hand and at least two overs remaining. However, Rana Naved-ul-Hasan holed out a catch to Jonathan Moss, Mushtaq Ahmed could add no run from three balls, and in the end, James Kirtley was bowled by Moss on the last ball, with Kirtley needing to hit a boundary to win the game. (Cricinfo scorecard)

==== County Championship: Derbyshire v Essex (16–19 August) ====
Essex (19pts) beat Derbyshire (6pts) by five wickets

Essex came back from a 120-run first innings deficit, after Derbyshire had used a day and a half for their first innings at The County Ground, Derby. Derbyshire struck runs at a rate of 2.75 an over, but four batsmen still made fifties, and especially Luke Sutton took his time at the crease. His 88 took five hours, and he faced 241 deliveries. However, Derbyshire's tactic of attrition seemed to work – after making 426, all while Danish Kaneria was bowling (the Pakistani leg spinner bowled 60.1 overs, taking six for 111), Derbyshire immediately got breakthroughs with the ball. Essex were 18 for 3 before the Flower brothers – Grant and Andy – put on 60 for the fourth wicket to help close the gap. By stumps, Essex were 113 for 4 from 50 overs.

After run rates of just above 2.5 on the first two days, the third day gave the spectators nearly 400 runs while eighteen wickets fell. Graeme Welch took two wickets in consecutive deliveries in the early stages, as Essex were 128 for 6, but Ronnie Irani made a four-hour 99 and also had support from James Middlebrook (42) and Darren Gough – the latter registering 51 off just 38 deliveries. Welch finished with figures of five for 68, his second five-for of the season, as Essex finished on 306. Then, Essex' bowlers got wickets at a much more rapid rate than in the first innings, where Derbyshire had made 206 for the first four. In the second, they managed 34, as Ravinder Bopara got two wickets and Danish and Graham Napier dug out one each. Another three-hour effort from Luke Sutton and a 91-ball 74 from Jonathan Moss saw Derbyshire to stumps with a lead of 314 with eight down – Sutton still not out with 38. A further 22 runs were added on the second day, while Danish dismissed Jake Needham to complete his second five-for of the match – Sutton was left stranded on 46 not out, setting Essex 337 to win. As Alastair Cook (14), Grant Flower (11-ball duck) and Bopara (10) were dismissed in succession, Essex lost their first three wickets for 82, but William Jefferson made 83 to set them back on track, and a 177-run partnership between Andy Flower and Ronnie Irani left Essex with 33 to hit with five wickets to spare. Ronnie Irani and James Foster made it with five wickets to spare, and Derbyshire's run of matches without a win continued. (Cricinfo scorecard)

==== National League: Scotland v Derbyshire (26 August) ====
Derbyshire (4pts) beat Scotland (0pts) by three wickets (D/L method)

The Scottish Saltires were defeated by Derbyshire Phantoms at The Grange, despite three wickets from Ryan Watson and an unbeaten 71 from Fraser Watts. Scotland had been put in to bat by Derbyshire captain Luke Sutton, and were 42 for 4 after two wickets from new-ball bowler Graeme Welch, but Watts paired up well with the lower middle order before rain set in. Seven overs were cut off the Scottish innings, leaving them with 38 overs to play, and 27 off 19 balls from Pakistani all-rounder Yasir Arafat lifted them to 179 for 7. More rain cut Derbyshire's innings to 32 overs, and under the Duckworth-Lewis method they were set 161 to win. They were 120 for 2 after Steve Stubbings had put on 70 with Sutton, but Watson then got three wickets and Cedric English two, as the visitors lost their next five wickets for 27, but Stubbings, still at the crease, went on to make 75 not out to guide Derbyshire past the target with three balls to spare. (Cricinfo scorecard)

==== National League: Yorkshire v Derbyshire (28 August) ====
Derbyshire (4pts) beat Yorkshire (0pts) by five wickets

Graeme Welch and Ant Botha took Derbyshire Phantoms to their fourth successive National League victory with an unbeaten 102-run partnership at Scarborough after Deon Kruis and Richard Dawson had taken out early wickets to see the Phantoms to 119 for 5 chasing 220 to win. It was Yorkshire Phoenix who batted first, Michael Lumb top-scoring with 69 while Australian Jonathan Moss dug out four for 28 in his nine overs. Yorkshire finished with 219 for 8, but their bowlers replied well to have Derbyshire at 85 for 4 when Travis Friend was run out. Welch and Botha's stand followed, however, and Derbyshire won with 15 balls to spare. (Cricinfo scorecard)

=== September ===
Derbyshire began September by coming close to a Championship victory, but failed to push home, finishing with a total of 277 for 6 chasing 280 to win at Riverside Ground in Durham. Their National League run of four victories also came to an end, as Surrey Lions bowled them out for 88 and took an eight-wicket win, but they bounced back two days later to beat Leicestershire Foxes and to go fourth in the National League table. A Championship draw with Leicestershire followed, and then a League win and a Championship draw against Yorkshire – the former sent them briefly third in the League, before Warwickshire Bears recorded two successive wins to go four points ahead with a game to play. On 24 September, Derbyshire completed their first win in 22 Championship matches, after beating Somerset at The County Ground, Taunton, but the following day saw their five-match unbeaten streak broken with a 135-run loss to Somerset to see them to fifth place in the League. Even a win would probably not have been good enough to promote, however, as Warwickshire Bears in third place had a much better net run rate.

==== County Championship: Durham v Derbyshire (30 August-2 September) ====
Derbyshire (10pts) drew with Durham (8pts)

Derbyshire medium pacer Ian Hunter, formerly of Durham, got career-best bowling figures of five for 63 as Derbyshire – the only winless team in the Championship so far this season – came three runs away from recording a win at Riverside Ground against the table-toppers from Durham. In Durham's first innings, where Hunter got his five-for, nine batsmen reached double figures, yet only two passed 30 and no one made it to fifty, as Dale Benkenstein top-scored with 49. Liam Plunkett dug out one wicket in the first evening and one on the second morning, as Derbyshire lost their first four for 64, but a 231-minute partnership between Jon Moss (92 runs) and Chris Bassano (87) yielded 148 runs to take Derbyshire within 18 of Durham's first-innings total of 230. Luke Sutton hit 55 off 119 balls, and Derbyshire made their way to 326 in 112.4 overs.

Australian opener Jimmy Maher recorded his second successive single-figure score in his first match for Durham, as the hosts made it 59 for 3, but centuries from Paul Collingwood and Dale Benkenstein sent them back in the lead. The pair added 206 runs together before Collingwood was out for 112 – his sixth first-class century in twelve matches – while Benkenstein continued to 162 not out, adding 80 runs with Gareth Breese and 21 for the ninth wicket with Brad Williams before declaring. The declaration set Derbyshire 280 to win in 66 overs, and Michael di Venuto and Steve Stubbings put on 91 for the first wicket to cut that down to 189. They had used two hours to hit those 91, though, leaving two hours for the remaining 189 – and though Stubbings completed his century, the rest of the batting order could not quite hit quite quickly enough, and they finished on 277 for 6 – three runs short of victory. (Cricinfo scorecard)

==== National League: Derbyshire v Surrey (4 September) ====
Surrey (4pts) beat Derbyshire (0pts) by eight wickets

Surrey Lions pace bowlers Azhar Mahmood and Tim Murtagh shared out the Derbyshire Phantoms' top order wickets at The County Ground, Derby. The hosts lost their first six men for 34, Murtagh taking four and Azhar two, before Ant Botha and Tom Lungley added 25 in just over half an hour. Lungley remained at the crease for a first-class-like 21, facing 74 balls, but his partners deserted him to leave him not out. On a day of low first-innings scores, Derbyshire's was the lowest with 88 – which was also their second-lowest of the season – as Murtagh finished with four for 14 and Azhar with three for 20, both from nine overs. James Benning then hit a boundary-filled 53 to guide Surrey to the target in just over a third of the allotted time. (Cricinfo scorecard)

==== National League: Leicestershire v Derbyshire (6 September) ====
Derbyshire (4pts) beat Leicestershire (0pts) by six wickets

In a low-scoring match at Grace Road, Leicestershire Foxes could take little advantage out of winning the toss and batting first, as Derbyshire Phantoms recorded their fifth win in six matches. Two wickets from Derbyshire's Australian all-rounder Jon Moss sent Leicestershire struggling to 42 for 4, and before a fifth-wicket partnership of 69 between Aftab Habib and Darren Robinson carried them past 100. Paul Nixon and Jeremy Snape hit the singles reasonably well, taking one boundary each in scores of 26 and 21 respectively, and at the end of 45 overs, Leicestershire had posted 164 for 8. Steve Stubbings and Michael di Venuto then added 62 for the first wicket, and despite Stubbings and Chris Bassano falling in successive overs, Derbyshire only lost two more wickets to finish on 168 for 4 with five overs potentially remaining. (Cricinfo scorecard)

==== County Championship: Leicestershire v Derbyshire (8–11 September) ====
Leicestershire (12pts) drew with Derbyshire (5pts)

Derbyshire pacer Ian Hunter continued on his good form from the last Championship match, where he took five for 63 against Durham, as he removed Leicestershire opener John Maunders for 0 in the second over of the match at Grace Road. That was as good as it got for Hunter and Durham, though, as Darren Robinson and Tom New accumulated 217 for the second wicket in four and a half hours, as Leicestershire went from 4 for 1 to 221 for 2. Nevertheless, one and a half days of lost play prevented them from forcing a victory. HD Ackerman, Dinesh Mongia and Paul Nixon also passed fifty in the first innings, as Leicestershire declared having made 552 for 6. Derbyshire then were 62 for 3 at the close of play on day two, but were saved by rain, as the third day's play was cancelled. In 50 overs on day four, Charl Willoughby and Stuart Broad took two wickets each as Derbyshire were all out for 190, but there was no time for another innings and the match was declared a draw. (Cricinfo scorecard)

==== National League: Derbyshire v Yorkshire (14 September) ====
Derbyshire (4pts) beat Yorkshire (0pts) by five wickets

Yorkshire Phoenix won the toss and chose to bat, and immediately lost both openers at Derby. That set the pace of the innings, and seven maiden overs were bowled out of the total of 45. Jonathan Moss got the best bowling figures for the hosting Derbyshire Phantoms, removing Rich Pyrah and Simon Guy in successive balls and ending with bowling figures of 9–2–27–3. Moss' two wickets set Yorkshire back to 66 for 7, and only a rearguard between Joe Sayers, who made 54 not out in two hours, and David Lucas saw them bat out the allotted overs. The pair added 65 for the ninth wicket as Yorkshire closed on 171 for 9. Derbyshire lost Michael di Venuto for 1 early on, but despite Anthony McGrath removing Hassan Adnan for 57 and Luke Sutton for 34, Derbyshire made it to the target with fourteen balls. Extras were the second-highest scorer, with 43, including 31 wides. (Cricinfo scorecard)

==== County Championship: Derbyshire v Yorkshire (16–19 September) ====
Yorkshire (12pts) drew with Derbyshire (7pts)

Yorkshire, a team chasing points in their attempt to promote from Division Two of the County Championship, racked up a 304-run lead on first innings against Derbyshire, yet failed to win. However, the 12 points earned gave them promotion from Division Two. Winning the toss and batting first, Yorkshire relied on Australians Mark Cleary and Ian Harvey to take wickets, as Cleary ended with three for 46 and Harvey with five for 40. Harvey got his first five-for of the season as Derbyshire were bowled out for 216, while Steve Stubbings was the only batsman to pass 30. Matthew Wood and Joe Sayers then added 113 for the first wicket to put Yorkshire 103 behind with all wickets intact at the end of the first day's play. On the second morning, Durham got four wickets for 101 before Anthony McGrath and Ian Harvey notched up centuries in a two-and-a-half-hour partnership worth 156. Yorkshire were eventually bowled out at stumps on day two, having made their way to a lead of 304, despite Ant Botha wrapping up the tail to take four for 90.

Steve Stubbings opened the batting for Derbyshire with a four-and-a-half-hour 91, leading Derbyshire to 216 for 4, but Mark Lawson set Derbyshire back with his leg spin, which reduced Derbyshire from 216 for 4 to 233 for 7. However, Botha and Tim Lungley added 133 for the seventh wicket, Botha recording his highest career score as his four hours at the crease yielded an unbeaten score of 156. Lawson wrapped up the Derbyshire innings, ending with five for 155 as Derbyshire were bowled out for 523, having added 290 for the last three wickets. Yorkshire required 220 in 59 overs to win, but Botha tied them down – in a marathon 23-over spell after coming on as first change bowler, Botha only conceded 20 runs and took two wickets – helping as Yorkshire lost their first six wickets for 82. Joe Sayers and Simon Guy then added 32 in three-quarters of an hour to save the draw for Yorkshire. (Cricinfo scorecard)

==== County Championship: Somerset v Derbyshire (21–24 September) ====
Derbyshire (22pts) beat Somerset (3pts) by an innings and 18 runs

Half-centuries from James Hildreth and James Francis took Somerset to 259 in 64.5 overs at their home ground at Taunton. Hildreth's 84 included 15 fours, while Francis hit ten fours in his 54. For Derbyshire, all-rounder Graeme Welch took three early wickets for 42, while 19-year-old Wayne White, who had made his first class debut with match figures of one for 123 a week earlier against Yorkshire, ended with four wickets for 77 in just under 13 overs. Chris Bassano and Steve Stubbings then added 87 for the first wicket, and Derbyshire closed on 126 for 1. On the second day, Stubbings continued with Hassan Adnan, and both earned career best scores – Stubbings with 151 and Adnan with 191 not out. Gareth Andrew was the only Somerset bowler to take more than one wicket, ending with four for 134, but Derbyshire made 707 for 7 – a county record – declaring when Luke Sutton fell for 53, leaving Graeme Welch stranded on 99 not out.

Francis then hit a 125-ball century as Somerset battled to save the draw and avoid becoming the first team to lose to Derbyshire for 14 months. But Francis went early on the last morning, the last man out in a collapse that started with 173 for 2 in the morning (Arul Suppiah had been dismissed with the score 172 for 1) and ended on 174 for 5. Somerset captain Ian Blackwell took seventeen fours and two sixes off Derbyshire's bowling in a 67-ball ton, but Welch came back, taking the last three wickets as Derbyshire broke their duck of 21 matches without a win and completed their Championship win since July 2004. (Cricinfo scorecard)

==== National League: Somerset v Derbyshire (25 September) ====
Somerset (4pts) beat Derbyshire (0pts) by 135 runs

Derbyshire Phantoms failed to carry their momentum from the Championship match earlier in the week, and fell to Somerset Sabres and the all-round effort of Ian Blackwell to lose their chance of promotion into Division 1. The Sabres were put in to bat, and after Matthew Wood and James Francis added 100 for the first wicket, Blackwell stepped in to bat. He hit 75, the same number of runs as Keith Parsons from number 5, and Somerset closed on 300 for 6. Derbyshire batsmen Ben France and Hassan Adnan started to build towards the target of 301 to win with an 81-run partnership for the second wicket, but both of them were stumped off Blackwell, and he also had three men caught off his bowling to end with five for 26. Malaysian Arul Suppiah helped out as well, taking two for 23, and two run outs left Derbyshire all out for 165. (Cricinfo scorecard)

== Statistics ==
=== Competition batting averages ===
Name	H	County Championship						totesport League,						Cheltenham and Gloucester Trophy						Twenty20 Cup					
Name	H	M	I	Runs	HS	Ave	100	M	I	Runs	HS	Ave	100	M	I	Runs	HS	Ave	100	M	I	Runs	HS	Ave	100
CWG Bassano	R	8	13	381	87	29.30	0	4	4	20	15	5.00	0	2	2	63	57	31.50	0						
AG Botha	L	16	27	808	156*	40.40	1	18	13	153	56*	17.00	0	2	2	49	34*	49.00	0	8	7	80	25*	16.00	0
PM Borrington	R	2	2	32	28	16.00	0																		
JDC Bryant	R	4	8	132	61	18.85	0	5	5	152	53	38.00	0							4	3	84	53*	42.00	0
KJ Dean	L	3	5	45	12	11.25	0	7	2	2	1*		0	2	2	5	5*		0	7	1	3	3*		0
MJ Di Venuto	L	12	24	1133	203	51.50	3	17	17	753	129*	47.06	3	2	2	21	18	10.50	0	8	8	204	77*	29.14	0
BJ France	L	7	13	189	56	14.53	0	1	1	31	31	31.00	0												
TJ Friend	R	3	6	120	82	20.00	0	9	9	143	52	17.87	0							4	3	41	24	13.66	0
AKD Gray	R	8	13	237	77*	29.62	0	12	4	18	13	6.00	0							7	2	2	1	1.00	0
Hassan Adnan	R	15	27	748	191	27.70	2	7	7	256	62	42.66	0	2	2	9	6	4.50	0	2	1	26	26	26.00	0
PMR Havell	L	3	5	10	6*	10.00	0	1	0																
ID Hunter	R	12	19	189	40	13.50	0	16	8	39	12*	7.80	0	2	2	10	9	5.00	0	8	2	12	12	12.00	0
T Lungley	L	3	3	41	36	13.66	0	14	7	76	22*	15.20	0	2	2	27	14	13.50	0	8	5	46	25	15.33	0
J Moss		16	29	877	106	30.24	1	17	17	418	79	29.85	0	2	2	33	26	16.50	0	8	8	225	83	32.14	0
J Needham	R	1	2	7	6	7.00	0	4	2	9	9*	9.00	0												
Mohammed Sheikh	L	5	8	137	55	17.12	0	11	6	46	18	9.20	0							6	4	29	20	9.66	0
Ben Spendlove	R							2	2	15	11	7.50	0	2	2	12	8	6.00	0						
SD Stubbings	L	15	27	1072	151	41.23	2	14	14	524	98	40.30	0							1	1	8	8	8.00	0
LD Sutton	R	16	28	816	95	34.00	0	18	18	321	63*	21.40	0	2	2	48	41	24.00	0	8	7	211	61*	42.20	0
NGE Walker	R	9	13	154	79	15.40	0	6	5	14	6*	3.50	0							1	1	8	8	8.00	0
G Welch	R	16	28	792	112	31.68	1	15	13	254	58*	28.22	0	2	2	71	50	35.50	0	8	7	53	20	7.57	0
WA White	R							2	2	8	6	4.00	0												

==== Most runs First-class cricket ====
Qualification: 750 runs

Derbyshire County Cricket Club in 2005 – leading batsmen by first-class runs scored
Name	Mat	Inns	NO	Runs	HS	100	50	Ave
Michael Di Venuto	13	26	2	1193	203	3	5	49.70
Steve Stubbings	16	29	1	1126	151	2	8	40.21
Jonathan Moss	17	31	1	1021	109*	2	7	34.03
Luke Sutton	17	29	4	833	95	0	4	33.32
Graeme Welch	17	29	3	818	112	1	4	31.46
Hassan Adnan	16	29	1	817	191	2	3	29.17
Ant Botha	17	28	7	808	156*	1	2	38.47

==== Most runs List-A cricket ====
Qualification: 300 runs

Derbyshire County Cricket Club in 2005 – leading batsmen by List A runs scored
Name	Mat	Inns	NO	Runs	HS	100	50	Ave
Michael Di Venuto	19	19	1	774	129*	3	2	43.00
Steve Stubbings	15	15	1	569	98	0	4	40.64
Jonathan Moss	20	20	3	523	79	0	3	30.76
Luke Sutton	21	21	4	411	63*	0	1	24.17
Graeme Welch	18	15	4	325	58*	0	2	29.54

=== Competition bowling averages ===
Name	H	County Championship					totesport League					Cheltenham and Gloucester Trophy					Twenty20 Cup				
Name	H	Balls	Runs	Wkts	Best	Ave	Balls	Runs	Wkts	Best	Ave	Balls	Runs	Wkts	Best	Ave	Balls	Runs	Wkts	Best	Ave
AG Botha	LS	2710	1401	33	6–104	42.45	592	545	20	3–18	27.25	120	84	7	4–44	12.00	186	211	9	2–16	23.44
KJ Dean	LF	503	283	3	3–93	94.33	252	198	11	5–45	18.00	90	53	0			114	146	3	2–20	48.66
BJ France	RM	96	70	1	1–37	70.00															
TJ Friend	RF						54	50	2	2–50	25.00										
AKD Gray	RO	1048	565	12	3–56	47.08	373	295	13	3–47	22.69						156	176	7	2–21	25.14
Hassan Adnan	RO	78	49	0													12	18	0		
PMR Havell	RF	491	385	6	3–106	64.16															
ID Hunter	RM	2139	1442	33	5–63	43.69	606	555	15	2–23	37.00	114	103	2	2–52	51.50	174	238	12	3–26	19.83
T Lungley	RM	474	320	5	2–54	64.00	324	273	4	1–13	68.25	84	82	2	2–40	41.00	114	145	8	3–21	18.12
J Moss	RM	1894	906	23	4–40	39.39	702	516	27	4–28	19.11	72	60	1	1–46	60.00	24	41	1	1–41	41.00
J Needham	RO	90	68	2	2–42	34.00	96	102	2	1–35	51.00										
Mohammed Sheikh	RM	1055	498	13	4–67	38.30	474	292	6	1–16	48.66						96	165	5	2–25	33.00
NGE Walker	RM	1151	837	16	4–69	52.31	94	98	1	1–19	98.00										
G Welch	RM	3165	1506	58	5–63	25.96	666	474	12	2–21	39.50	120	97	0			78	145	1	1–16	145.00
WA White	RM	353	280	5	4–77	56.00															

==== Most wickets First Class cricket ====
Qualification: 30 wickets

Derbyshire County Cricket Club in 2005 – leading bowlers by first class wickets taken
Name	Overs	Mdns	Runs	Wkts	BBI	Ave	SR	ER
Graeme Welch	549.3	139	1559	60	5–63	25.98	54.9	2.83
Ian Hunter	382.3	56	1506	34	5–63	44.29	67.5	3.93
Ant Botha	473.4	109	1506	33	6–104	45.63	86.1	3.17

==== Most wickets ListA cricket ====
Qualification: 15 wickets

Derbyshire County Cricket Club in 2005 – leading bowlers by List A wickets taken
Name	Overs	Mdns	Runs	Wkts	BBI	Ave	SR	ER
Jonathan Moss	129	8	576	28	4–28	20.57	27.6	4.46
Ant Botha	126.5	1	669	28	4–44	23.89	27.1	5.27
Ian Hunter	128	6	703	17	2–23	41.35	45.1	5.49
Andy Gray	72.1	0	335	15	3–47	22.33	28.8	4.64

=== Wicket Keeping ===
Luke Sutton

County Championship Catches 50, Stumping 0
totesport league Catches 19, Stumping 3
Cheltenham & Gloucester Catches 0, Stumping 0
Twenty20 Catches 3, Stumping 3

== See also ==
- Derbyshire County Cricket Club seasons
- 2005 English cricket season
