= Derbyshire County Cricket Club in 2006 =

2006 season of an English cricket team

Derbyshire County Cricket Club seasons
2006 season
- Captain: Graeme Welch
- County Championship: Div 2 – 5
- Pro40: Div 2 – 8
- Cheltenham and Gloucester Trophy: North – 5
- Twenty20 Cup.: North – 6
- Most runs: Michael Di Venuto
- Most wickets: Steffan Jones
- Most catches: James Pipe

Derbyshire County Cricket Club in 2006 was the cricket season when the English club Derbyshire had been playing for one hundred and thirty-five years. In the County Championship, they finished fifth in the second division. In the Pro40 league, they finished eighth in the second division. They were eliminated at group level in the Cheltenham and Gloucester Trophy and came eighth in the North section of the Twenty20 Cup.

== 2006 season ==
Derbyshire was in Division 2 of the County Championship and finished in fifth position. In addition to the Championship, they played Oxford University. Of their eighteen first class games, they won four and lost five, the remainder being drawn. Derbyshire was in Division 2 of the NatWest Pro40 League in which they won one of their eight matches to finish eighth in the division. In the Cheltenham and Gloucester Trophy Derbyshire played in the Northern group, coming fifth in the table. In the Twenty20 Cup, Derbyshire played in the North Division and won two matches to finish sixth in the division. Graeme Welch was captain and Michael Di Venuto top scorer with three centuries. Steffan Jones took most wickets.

== Matches ==
=== First Class ===
List of matches
No.	Date	V	Result	Margin	Notes
1	15 Apr 2006	Oxford University; The University Parks, Oxford	Drawn		CR Taylor 102
2	19 Apr 2006	Surrey; Kennington Oval	Drawn		AG Botha 100; Clarke 130; Mahmood 5-69; MA Sheikh 5-65
3	29 Apr 2006	Sri Lankans; County Ground, Derby	Lost	6 wickets	
4	3 May 2006	Glamorgan; Sophia Gardens, Cardiff	Won	28 runs	CR Taylor 121; Cosgrove 114; Powell 100; PS Jones 6-25
5	10 May 2006	Worcestershire; County Ground, New Road, Worcester	Won	35 runs	Solanki 110; Khan 6-60; Ali 7-43
6	17 May 2006	Leicestershire; County Ground, Derby	Drawn		SD Stubbings 119; TR Birt 119
7	24 May 2006	Northamptonshire; County Ground, Northampton	Drawn		Nicholson 106
8	6 Jun 2006	Glamorgan; County Ground, Derby	Lost	6 wickets	Cosgrove 233; Croft 5-56
9	14 Jun 2006	Gloucestershire; County Ground, Bristol	Drawn		TR Birt 181; CG Taylor 121
10	20 Jun 2006	Essex; County Ground, Derby	Lost	8 wickets	TR Birt 130; Bichel 6-38
11	14 Jul 2006	Somerset; County Ground, Taunton	Won	344 runs	MJ North 132; Trego 135; SD Stubbings 124; GG Wagg 6-38
12	19 Jul 2006	Leicestershire; Grace Road, Leicester	Drawn		Hassan Adnan 117; MJ Di Venuto 161; Broad 5-89
13	26 Jul 2006	Worcestershire; Queen's Park, Chesterfield	Drawn		Solanki 140; S Davies 107; MJ North 161; Mason 5-49; AG Botha 6-117
14	8 Aug 2006	Somerset; County Ground, Derby	Won	80 runs	MJ Di Venuto 118; C White 260
15	17 Aug 2006	Gloucestershire; County Ground, Derby	Drawn		MJ Di Venuto 104
16	30 Aug 2006	Northamptonshire; County Ground, Derby	Drawn		Rogers 112; Klusener 128; CR Taylor 103
17	9 Sep 2006	Essex; County Ground, Chelmsford	Lost	Innings and 178 runs	Pettini 208; Tudor 144; Flower 136*; Philips 5-41
18	20 Sep 2006	Surrey; County Ground, Derby	Lost	5 wickets	

=== NatWest Pro40 League ===
List of matches
No.	Date	V	Result	Margin	Notes
1	30 Jul 2006	Surrey; Queen's Park, Chesterfield	Lost	8 wickets	Brown 106
2	2 Aug 2006	Yorkshire; County Ground, Derby	Abandoned		
3	13 Aug 2006	Hampshire; The Rose Bowl, Southampton	Lost	1 wicket	Crawley 100
4	15 Aug 2006	Gloucestershire; County Ground, Derby	Lost	37 runs	
5	27 Aug 2006	Kent; St Lawrence Ground, Canterbury	Lost	7 wickets	
6	3 Sep 2006	Worcestershire; County Ground, New Road, Worcester	Lost	76 runs	
7	6 Sep 2006	Somerset; County Ground, Derby	Won	7 wickets	Hildreth 122; TR Birt 108
8	17 Sep 2006	Leicestershire; Grace Road, Leicester	Lost	4 wickets	

=== Cheltenham and Gloucester Trophy ===
List of matches
No.	Date	V	Result	Margin	Notes
1	23 Apr 2006	Yorkshire; Headingley, Leeds	Won	2 runs	CR Taylor 100
2	7 May 2006	Leicestershire; County Ground, Derby	Won	5 wickets	
3	14 May 2006	Warwickshire; Edgbaston, Birmingham	Won	9 runs	PS Jones 5-49
4	28 May 2006	Scotland; County Ground, Derby	Lost	8 wickets	Watson 108
5	29 May 2006	Worcestershire; County Ground, Derby	Won	7 wickets	
6	2 Jun 2006	Nottinghamshire; County Ground, Derby	Lost	56 runs	
7	11 Jun 2006	Lancashire; Old Trafford, Manchester	Lost	9 wickets	Loye 120
8	18 Jun 2006	Northamptonshire; County Ground, Northampton	Lost	1 run	SD Stubbings 110
9	25 Jun 2006	Durham; County Ground, Derby	Won	5 wickets	Maher 125; CR Taylor 111

=== Other List A ===
List of matches
No.	Date	V	Result	Margin	Notes
1	6 Aug 2006	West Indies A County Ground, Derby	Won	30 runs	AG Botha 5-60

=== Twenty20 Cup ===
List of matches
No.	Date	V	Result	Margin	Notes
1	27 Jun 2006	Lancashire; County Ground, Derby	Won	5 wickets	
2	30 Jun 2006	Leicestershire; County Ground, Derby	Lost	86 runs	
3	3 Jul 2006	Lancashire; Old Trafford, Manchester	Lost	48 runs	
4	5 Jul 2006	Leicestershire; Grace Road, Leicester	Lost	18 runs	
5	7 Jul 2006	Nottinghamshire; County Ground, Derby	Lost	7 wickets	
6	8 Jul 2006	Durham; Riverside Ground, Chester-le-Street	Won	2 runs	
7	10 Jul 2006	Yorkshire; County Ground, Derby	No result		
8	11 Jul 2006	Nottinghamshire; Trent Bridge, Nottingham	Lost	9 wickets	

== Statistics ==
=== Competition batting averages ===
Name	H	County Championship						Pro40 league,						Cheltenham and Gloucester Trophy						Twenty20 Cup					
Name	H	M	I	Runs	HS	Ave	100	M	I	Runs	HS	Ave	100	M	I	Runs	HS	Ave	100	M	I	Runs	HS	Ave	100
Batsmen
PM Borrington	R	1	2	56	38	28.00	0																		
Hassan Adnan	R	16	26	776	117	29.84	1	6	5	135	36	27.00	0	5	5	95	45	19.00	0	5	4	80	54*	40.00	0
MJ Di Venuto	L	13	22	1110	161*	52.85	3	2	2	92	58	46.00	0	9	9	202	93*	25.25	0	8	7	146	53	20.85	0
TR Birt	L	12	20	967	181	53.72	3	6	6	211	108	35.16	1	8	8	300	76	37.50	0						
DJ Redfern	L							1	1	6	6	6.00	0												
SD Stubbings	L	16	28	951	124	35.22	2	7	7	254	72	36.28	0	9	9	273	110	30.33	1	8	8	178	57	25.42	0
CR Taylor	R	13	23	719	121	31.26	2	5	5	173	60*	43.25	0	8	8	391	111*	78.20	2	8	7	92	25	23.00	0
All-rounders
GS Ballance	L							2	2	79	73	39.50	0												
AG Botha	L	10	17	374	100	22.00	1	7	7	133	41*	33.25	0	9	8	159	42	22.71	0	7	4	41	16	13.66	0
RJ Browning	R							1	1	2	2	2.00	0												
LJ Goddard	R	4	6	209	91	52.25	0	4	3	50	36	25.00	0												
PS Jones	R	16	21	227	34*	15.13	0	1	1	24	24	24.00	0	7	4	25	10*	8.33	0	7	3	14	7	4.66	0
MJ North	L	3	6	465	161	93.00	2							1	1	8	8	8.00	0	8	7	112	45	16.00	0
MA Sheikh	L	8	12	264	51*	29.33	0							6	3	40	15	13.33	0						
GM Smith	R	5	9	227	86	28.37	0	5	5	105	35	21.00	0	1	1	20	20	20.00	0						
GG Wagg	R	9	14	317	94	24.38	0	6	5	65	36	16.25	0	3	2	8	6	4.00	0	8	7	109	27	18.16	0
WA White	R	1	2	37	19*		0	2	0																
Wicket-keepers
DJ Pipe	R	12	19	500	89	33.33	0	3	2	19	16*	19.00	0	9	7	69	19	11.50	0	8	6	80	29*	16.00	0
Bowlers
KJ Dean	L	3	4	19	18	9.50	0	7	4	3	3	1.00	0	5	2	1	1	1.00	0	8	3	8	8*		0
AKD Gray	R	7	10	133	29	16.62	0							5	4	41	15	20.50	0	1	0				0
ID Hunter	R	13	13	102	48	14.57	0 0 6	1	1	1	1	1.00	0	3	2	5	5*	5.00	0	1	0				0
T Lungley	L							2	1	1	1	1.00	0	2	1	13	13	13.00	0	3	2	14	7	7.00	0
J Needham	R	1	2	29	29	14.50	0	6	4	38	14	38.00	0	1	1	13	13	13.00	0						
WB Rankin	L							1	0				0												
G Welch	R	13	20	336	94	19.76	0	2	2	27	16	13.50	0	8	7	151	50	30.20	0	8	5	39	17	7.80	0

Leading first-class batsmen for Derbyshire by runs scored
Name	Mat	Inns	Runs	HS	Ave	100
MJ Di Venuto	14	23	1198	161*	54.45	3
TR Birt	14	24	1059	181	48.13	3
SD Stubbings	18	32	1056	124	34.06	2
CR Taylor	15	26	908	121	34.92	3
Hassan Adnan	18	29	893	117	33.07	1

Leading List A batsmen for Derbyshire by runs scored
Name	Mat	Inns	Runs	HS	Ave	100
SD Stubbings	17	17	583	110	34.29	1
CR Taylor	13	13	564	111*	62.66	2
TR Birt	15	15	564	108	37.60	1
AG Botha	17	16	338	46*	30.72	0
MJ Di Venuto	11	11	294	93*	29.40	0

=== Competition bowling averages ===
Name	H	County Championship					Pro40 league,					Cheltenham and Gloucester Trophy					Twenty20 Cup				
Name	H	Balls	Runs	Wkts	Best	Ave	Balls	Runs	Wkts	Best	Ave	Balls	Runs	Wkts	Best	Ave	Balls	Runs	Wkts	Best	Ave
TR Birt	RM	150	118	2	1-24	59.00	54	46	4	2-15	11.50	36	39	1	1-30	39.00					
AG Botha	LS	1767	981	24	6-117	40.87	276	260	4	1-37	65.00	441	336	8	2-31	42.00	114	151	6	2-46	25.16
RJ Browning	RM						18	26	0												
KJ Dean	LF	318	231	2	1-31	115.50	306	258	5	1-19	51.60	246	186	11	3-39	16.90	164	217	8	2-14	27.12
AKD Gray	RO	1012	552	12	3-106	46.00						282	206	7	3-44	29.42	24	23	0		
Hassan Adnan	RO	54	37	1	1-4	37.00	6	13	0			30	20	1	1-20	20.00	18	19	1	1-19	19.00
ID Hunter	RF	2016	1242	32	4-47	38.81	47	45	0			132	105	2	2-53	52.50	18	33	0		
PS Jones	RM	2968	1804	56	6-25	32.21	46	56	1	1-56	56.00	366	306	10	5-49	30.60	139	201	10	3-26	20.10
T Lungley	RF						78	98	3	2-61	32.66	90	99	0			48	53	1	1-17	53.00
J Needham	RO	90	88	0			224	202	3	1-29	67.33	60	33	1	1-33	33.00					
MJ North	RO	252	91	1	1-43	91.00						6	10	0			120	132	2	1-23	66.00
WB Rankin	RF						24	25	1	1-25	25.00										
MA Sheikh	RM	1211	591	14	5-65	42.21						277	179	7	2-30	25.57					
GM Smith	RF	281	182	2	1-18	91.00	114	129	4	2-44	32.25	12	20	0							
SD Stubbings	RO	6	2	0																	
GG Wagg	LM	1281	904	24	6-38	37.66	240	300	8	4-66	37.50	155	156	6	4-59	26.00	138	219	6	3-24	36.50
G Welch	RM	2085	1071	30	4-33	35.70	36	41	0			380	246	0			143	220	6	3-31	36.66
WA White	RM	126	83	6	4-35	13.83	90	101	2	1-38	50.50										

Leading first class bowlers for Derbyshire by wickets taken
Name	Balls	Runs	Wkts	BBI	Ave
PS Jones	3145	1871	59	6-25	31.71
ID Hunter	2214	1328	36	4-22	36.88
G Welch	2349	1198	36	4-33	33.27
AG Botha	1995	1124	29	6-117	38.75
GG Wagg	1281	904	24	6-38	37.66

Leading List A bowlers for Derbyshire by wickets taken
Name	Balls	Runs	Wkts	BBI	Ave
KJ Dean	612	500	18	3-39	27.77
AG Botha	777	656	17	5-60	38.58
GG Wagg	425	488	14	4-59	34.85
PS Jones	412	362	11	5-49	32.90

=== Wicket Keeping ===
James Pipe

County Championship Catches 39, Stumping 6
PRO40 Catches 2, Stumping 0
Friends Provident Catches 8, Stumping 1
Twenty20 Catches 4, Stumping 3

== See also ==
- Derbyshire County Cricket Club seasons
- 2006 English cricket season
