= Derbyshire County Cricket Club in 2007 =

2007 season of an English cricket team

Derbyshire County Cricket Club seasons
2007 season
- Captain: Simon Katich
- County Championship: Div 2 - 6
- Pro40: Div 2 - 8
- Friends Provident Trophy: North - 8
- Twenty20 Cup.: North - 6
- Most runs: Simon Katich
- Most wickets: Tom Lungley
- Most catches: James Pipe

Derbyshire County Cricket Club in 2007 was the cricket season when the English club Derbyshire had been playing for one hundred and thirty-six years. In the County Championship, they finished sixth in the second division. In the Pro40 league, they finished eighth in the second division. They were eliminated at group level in the Friends Provident Trophy and came eighth in the North section of the Twenty20 Cup.

== 2007 season ==
Derbyshire was in Division 2 of the County Championship and finished in sixth position. In addition to the Championship, they played Cambridge University. Of their seventeen first class games, they won two and lost three, the remainder being drawn. Derbyshire was in Division 2 of the NatWest Pro40 League in which they won one of their eight matches to finish eighth in the division. In the Friends Provident Trophy Derbyshire played in the Northern group, coming eighth in the table. In the Twenty20 Cup, Derbyshire played in the North Division and won one match to finish sixth in the division. Simon Katich was captain and top scorer with three centuries. Tom Lungley took most wickets.

Derbyshire recorded their highest ever score, 801 for eight declared, against Somerset at Taunton in May. Their score beat their previous highest ever score, of 707 for 7 declared also against Somerset also at Taunton in the 2005 season. Simon Katich scored 221, Ian Harvey 153, Ant Botha 101 and James Pipe 106. Derbyshire broke the record despite losing Phil Weston and Chris Taylor to Andy Caddick in the first over without a run on the board.

== Matches ==
=== First Class ===
List of matches
No.	Date	V	Result	Margin	Notes
1	18 Apr 2007	Essex; County Ground, Chelmsford	Drawn		IJ Harvey 136; DJ Pipe 133; Cook 100; Irani 144; Kaneira 5-152
2	25 Apr 2007	Cambridge University; FP Fenner's Ground, Cambridge	Drawn		DJ Birch 130; FA Klokker 100
3	2 May 2007	Somerset; County Ground, Taunton	Drawn		SM Katich 221; IJ Harvey 153; AG Botha 101; DJ Pipe 106; C White 138; Langer 136; GG Wagg 5-148
4	9 May 2007	Leicestershire; County Ground, Derby	Won	7 wickets	T Lungley 5-20
5	16 May 2007	Middlesex; County Ground, Derby	Drawn		Richardson 5-50
6	23 May 2007	Northamptonshire; County Ground, Northampton	Lost	6 wickets	Peters 107; SD Stubbings 104; WA White 5-87
7	05 Jun 2007	Gloucestershire; County Ground, Derby	Drawn		SD Stubbings 128; Marshall 120; Hardinges 104; T Lungley 5-49
8	15 Jun 2007	Nottinghamshire; Trent Bridge, Nottingham	Drawn		Wagh 123; Shreck 7-35
9	08 Jul 2007	Middlesex; John Walker's Ground, Southgate	Won	15 runs	T Lungley 5-33; Kartik 5-38
10	20 Jul 2007	Glamorgan; County Ground, Derby	Drawn		KJ Dean 5-24; Croft 6-44
11	25 Jul 2007	Somerset; County Ground, Derby	Lost	278 runs	AG Botha 6-101
12	31 Jul 2007	Gloucestershire; County Ground, Bristol	Drawn		TR Birt 140 and 162; Hodnett 168; Gidman 111; SM Katich 124*; GG Wagg 5-119
13	09 Aug 2007	Leicestershire; Grace Road, Leicester	Lost	28 runs	SM Katich 167; Masters 5-42; AG Botha 5-69; Broad 5-67
14	22 Aug 2007	Glamorgan; Sophia Gardens, Cardiff	Won	42 runs	Rees 109; Croft 5-62 and 6-88; AG Botha 5-67
15	30 Aug 2007	Essex; County Ground, Derby	Lost	227 runs	ten Doeschate 132; Bichel 7-36; Kaneira 6-45
16	06 Sep 2007	Nottinghamshire; Queen's Park, Chesterfield	Lost	Innings and 6 runs	Fleming 243; JL Clare 5-90
17	19 Sep 2007	Northamptonshire; County Ground, Derby	Drawn		Klusener 5-98

=== NatWest Pro40 League ===
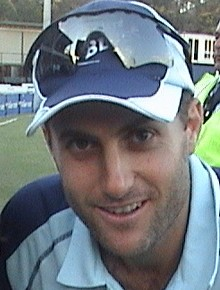
Simon Katich - captain and top scorer

List of matches
No.	Date	V	Result	Margin	Notes
1	16 Jul 2007	Glamorgan; County Ground, Derby	Won	7 wickets	
2	29 Jul 2007	Kent; County Ground, Derby	Lost	10 runs	Key 104
3	05 Aug 2007	Somerset; County Ground, Derby	Lost	32 runs	
4	07 Aug 2007	Leicestershire; County Ground, Derby	Lost	1 wicket	
5	19 Aug 2007	Surrey; Kennington Oval	Lost	24 runs	
6	04 Sep 2007	Durham; Queen's Park, Chesterfield	Lost	7 wickets	
7	10 Sep 2007	Middlesex; Lord's Cricket Ground, St John's Wood	Lost	4 wickets	
8	15 Sep 2007	Yorkshire; Headingley, Leeds	Lost	107 runs	

=== Friends Provident Trophy ===
List of matches
No.	Date	V	Result	Margin	Notes
1	29 Apr 2007	Durham; Riverside Ground, Chester-le-Street	Won	4 wickets	
2	7 May 2007	Warwickshire; County Ground, Derby	Lost	26 runs	Maddy 117
3	13 May 2007	Northamptonshire; County Ground, Derby	Abandoned		
4	20 May 2007	Worcestershire; County Ground, New Road, Worcester	Lost	7 wickets	
5	28 May 2007	Nottinghamshire; Trent Bridge, Nottingham	Lost	50 runs	
6	31 May 2007	Yorkshire; County Ground, Derby	Lost	39 runs	
7	03 Jun 2007	Scotland; Grange Cricket Club Ground, Raeburn Place, Edinburgh	Won	6 wickets	
8	10 Jun 2007	Lancashire; County Ground, Derby	Lost	6 wickets	Hodge 119
9	13 Jun 2007	Leicestershire; Grace Road, Leicester	Lost	9 wickets	Maunders 109; Sadler 113; Allenby 5-43

=== Twenty20 Cup ===
List of matches
No.	Date	V	Result	Margin	Notes
1	22 Jun 2007	Nottinghamshire; County Ground, Derby	Lost	6 wickets	
2	24 Jun 2007	West Indian cricket team in England in 2007; County Ground, Derby	Won	51 runs	
3	25 Jun 2007	Durham; County Ground, Derby	Abandoned		
4	27 Jun 2007	Nottinghamshire; Trent Bridge, Nottingham	Lost	53 runs	
5	29 Jun 2007	Leicestershire; County Ground, Derby	Lost	6 wickets	
6	01 Jul 2007	Lancashire; Old Trafford, Manchester	Abandoned		
7	02 Jul 2007	Leicestershire; Grace Road, Leicester	No result		
8	05 Jul 2007	Lancashire; County Ground, Derby	Abandoned		
9	06 Jul 2007	Yorkshire; Headingley, Leeds	Lost	4 wickets	

== Statistics ==
=== Competition batting averages ===
Name	H	County Championship						Pro40 league,						Friends Provident Trophy						Twenty20 Cup					
Name	H	M	I	Runs	HS	Ave	100	M	I	Runs	HS	Ave	100	M	I	Runs	HS	Ave	100	M	I	Runs	HS	Ave	100
Batsmen
PM Borrington	R	1	2	64	50	32.00	0																		
Hassan Adnan	R	10	19	379	63	22.29	0	3	3	73	51	24.33	0	1	1	13	13	13.00	0						
DJ Birch	L	3	6	106	95	17.66	0	2	2	16	10	8.00	0	6	6	183	60	30.50	0						
TR Birt	L	13	24	884	162	38.43	2	8	8	224	47	32.00	0	6	6	33	10*	6.60	0	5	5	104	40	20.80	0
MG Dighton	R	7	14	418	68	32.15	0	6	6	175	67	29.16	0							5	5	67	25*	16.75	0
SM Katich	L	13	23	1284	221	75.52	3	7	7	157	46*	26.16	0	6	6	146	81	24.33	0	5	5	128	39*	42.66	0
DJ Redfern	L	4	6	134	51	26.80	0	5	4	54	32	13.50	0												
SD Stubbings	L	15	29	788	128	29.18	2							6	6	91	57	15.16	0						
CR Taylor	R	4	6	168	96	28.00	0							3	3	72	34*	36.00	0	5	4	27	15*	13.50	0
WPC Weston	L	9	15	198	38	13.20	0	4	4	168	72	42.00	0	3	3	101	78	33.66	0						
All-rounders
GS Ballance	L													1	1	2	2	2.00	0						
AG Botha	L	14	19	410	101	22.77	1	5	4	69	40*	23.00	0	8	8	198	54*	39.60	0	5	4	76	26	19.00	0
IJ Harvey	R	2	3	289	153	144.50	2							2	2	67	60*	67.00	0						
R Hodgkinson	R	1	1	6	6	6.00	0																		
GM Smith	R	11	18	356	74	22.25	0	8	8	259	88	32.37	0	8	8	165	56	20.62	0	5	5	124	79	24.80	0
GG Wagg	R	15	21	530	82	31.17	0	5	4	31	18	7.75	0	8	6	119	45	23.80	0	5	4	43	15	10.75	0
WA White	R	3	5	59	19	11.80	0	4	4	36	25	12.00	0	5	3	25	13*	25.00	0						
Wicket-keepers
FA Klokker		1	2	71	48	35.50																			
DJ Pipe	R	14	21	577	133*	36.06	2	7	7	43	17	7.16	0	8	7	161	83	26.83	0	3	3	13	12	4.33	0
T Poynton		2	3	2	2	0.66	0	1	0											2	1	3	3	3.00	0
Bowlers
JL Clare	R]	2	3	42	22	14.00	0	3	3	17	12	5.66	0												
KJ Dean	L	10	12	46	16	7.66	0	5	4	19	14*	0	0	2	1	3	3*	0	0	5	2	4	3	4.00	0
ID Hunter	R	1	1	1	1*	0	0							4	1	3	3*	0	0	2	2	2	2	1.00	0
T Lungley	L	15	21	169	30*	11.26	0	4	2	6	6*	0	0	6	3	7	3	2.33	0	5	2	8	8*	8.00	0
J Needham	R	3	5	104	48	34.66	0	7	7	90	42	18.00	0	4	3	27	18	13.50	0	3	1	0	0*	0	0
CD Paget	R							1	1	3	3	3.00	0												
WB Rankin	L	3	4	5	3	1.66	0	3	2	4	2*	4.00	0	1	0										

=== Competition bowling averages ===
Name	H	County Championship					Pro40 league,					Friends Provident Trophy					Twenty20 Cup				
Name	H	Balls	Runs	Wkts	Best	Ave	Balls	Runs	Wkts	Best	Ave	Balls	Runs	Wkts	Best	Ave	Balls	Runs	Wkts	Best	Ave
TR Birt		21	26	0								1	4	0							
AG Botha	L	2877	1464	51	6-101	28.70	132	133	3	2-31	44.33	271	214	8	3-52	26.75	87	113	5	4-29	22.60
JL Clare	R	296	203	10	5-90	20.30	108	117	4	3-44	29.25										
KJ Dean	LF	1602	659	23	5-24	28.65	222	208	3	1-21	69.33	108	69	1	1-32	69.00	86	130	5	2-26	26.00
MG Dighton		246	133	4	2-47	33.25	132	103	3	2-46	34.33						72	74	3	1-9	24.66
IJ Harvey		180	116	2	1-14	58.00						108	77	0							
R Hodgkinson		60	75	0																	
ID Hunter	RF	276	130	3	2-63	43.33						162	149	5	3-38	29.80	48	73	3	2-38	24.33
SM Katich	LS	228	144	2	1-17	72.00															
T Lungley	RF	2615	1555	59	5-20	26.35	138	106	6	3-11	17.66	270	250	7	3-50	35.71	84	119	2	1-15	59.50
J Needham	RO	380	209	6	3-92	34.83	180	156	2	2-36	78.00	84	87	0			9	19	0		
CD Paget	R						36	48	1	1-48	48.00										
WB Rankin	RF	459	292	10	4-41	29.20	111	141	3	2-56	47.00	36	36	0							
DJ Redfern		114	70	2	1-7	35.00															
GM Smith	RF	1219	656	18	3-31	36.44	198	162	7	2-32	23.14	241	212	7	3-19	30.28	24	37	0		
GG Wagg	LM	2952	1785	53	5-119	33.67	204	236	8	3-37	29.50	390	331	11	4-36	30.09	76	91	4	2-16	22.75
WPC Weston	LF	12	12	0																	
WA White		456	367	9	5-87	40.77	155	139	3	1-23	46.33	210	197	2	1-29	98.50					

=== Wicket Keeping ===
James Pipe

County Championship Catches 42, Stumping 4
PRO40 Catches 6, Stumping 2
Friends Provident Catches 5, Stumping 1
Twenty20 Catches 1, Stumping 2

Thomas Poynton

County Championship Catches 3
Twenty20 Catches 0, Stumping 2

Frederik Klokker

== See also ==
- Derbyshire County Cricket Club seasons
- 2007 English cricket season
