= Derbyshire County Cricket Club in 2004 =

2004 season of an English cricket team

Derbyshire County Cricket Club seasons
2004 season
- Captain: Luke Sutton
- County Championship: 2/8
- National League: 2/9
- Cheltenham and Gloucester Trophy: Round 2
- Twenty20 Cup.: Group
- Most runs: Hassan Adnan
- Most wickets: Graeme Welch
- Most catches: Luke Sutton

Derbyshire County Cricket Club in 2004 was the cricket season when the English club Derbyshire had been playing for one hundred and thirty-four years. In the County Championship, they finished eighth in the second division and in the National League, they finished ninth in the second division. They were knocked out in their first match in the Cheltenham and Gloucester Trophy. They were eliminated at group level in the North section of the Twenty20 Cup.

== 2004 season ==
Derbyshire was in Division 2 of the County Championship and finished in eighth position. In addition to the Championship, they played Durham University and the touring West Indies. Of their eighteen first class games, they won two and lost seven, the remainder being drawn. Derbyshire was in Division 2 of the NatWest Pro40 League in which they won five of their eighteen matches to finish ninth in the division. In the Cheltenham and Gloucester Trophy, Derbyshire were eliminated in their first match which was in the second round. They also played a one-day match against the touring New Zealanders. In the Twenty20 Cup, Derbyshire played in the North Division and won two matches.

Luke Sutton was captain. Hassan Adnan was top scorer and Graeme Welch took most wickets.

== Matches ==
=== First Class ===
List of matches
No.	Date	V	Result	Margin	Notes
1	16 Apr 2004	Glamorgan; Sophia Gardens, Cardiff	Drawn		Wallace 105;
2	21 Apr 2004	Somerset; County Ground, Taunton	Drawn		Bowler 127; Hassan Adnan 107; KJ Dean 5-86; Laraman 5-58
3	28 Apr 2004	Durham; County Ground, Derby	Drawn		CJL Rogers 156; North 119
4	7 May 2004	Hampshire; The Rose Bowl, Southampton	Drawn		Kenway 101; Pothas 131; Mascarenhas 6-25
5	19 May 2004	Somerset; County Ground, Derby	Drawn		Blackwell 111; Caddick 6-92; Walker 5-68
6	25 May 2004	Glamorgan; County Ground, Derby	Lost	128 runs	Hemp 102; G Welch 5-100
7	2 Jun 2004	Leicestershire; Oakham School Ground	Lost	6 wickets	Hodge 221; G Welch 115; Cleary 7-80
8	9 Jun 2004	Durham University; County Ground, Derby	Won	Innings and 5 runs	AG Botha 103 and 5-55; DBL Powell 6-49
9	18 Jun 2004	Nottinghamshire; Trent Bridge, Nottingham	Lost	10 wickets	Gallian 190; Pietersen 107; Read 130; Hassan Adnan 129; Shreck 6-103
10	23 Jun 2004	Essex; County Ground, Derby	Drawn		LD Sutton 131; Napier 5-56
11	21 Jul 2004	Durham; Riverside Ground, Chester-le-Street	Won	165 runs	J Moss 147; Davies 6-44
12	28 Jul 2004	Yorkshire; County Ground, Derby	Drawn		CWG Bassano 100; McGrath 174 and 5-39
13	5 Aug 2004	West Indies; County Ground, Derby	Lost	315 runs	Baugh 150; NRC Dumelow 5-51; Edward 5-61 and 5-22
14	12 Aug 2004	Yorkshire; Headingley, Leeds	Drawn		Wood 123; McGrath 109;
15	19 Aug 2004	Nottinghamshire; County Ground, Derby	Lost	Innings and 56 runs	Hassan Adnan 140; CWG Bassano 123; Bicknell 175; Pietersen 153; G Welch 5-101; G Smith 5-35
16	24 Aug 2004	Leicestershire; County Ground, Derby	Drawn		
17	9 Sep 2004	Essex; County Ground, Chelmsford	Lost	8 wickets	Middlebrook 5-26
18	16 Sep 2004	Hampshire; County Ground, Derby	Lost	91 runs	G Welch 5-57; Udal 6-79

=== totesport League ===
List of matches
No.	Date	V	Result	Margin	Notes
1	25 Apr 2004	Somerset; County Ground, Taunton	Lost	109 runs	
2	2 May 2004	Durham; County Ground, Derby	Won	6 wickets	
3	3 May 2004	Leicestershire; Grace Road, Leicester	Lost	33 runs	
4	23 May 2004	Somerset; County Ground, Derby	Lost	114 runs	Gazzard 157; Parsons 5-39
5	31 May 2004	Durham; Riverside Ground, Chester-le-Street	Lost	7 wickets	
6	6 Jun 2004	Middlesex; County Ground, Derby	Lost	8 wickets	
7	8 Jun 2004	Scotland; County Ground, Derby	Won	28 runs	
8	27 Jun 2004	Worcestershire; County Ground, Derby	Won	18 runs	J Moss 104
9	4 Jul 2004	Nottinghamshire; Trent Bridge, Nottingham	Won	9 wickets	CWG Bassano 100
10	11 Jul 2004	Middlesex; John Walker's Ground, Southgate	Lost	9 wickets	
11	18 Jul 2004	Sussex; County Ground, Derby	Lost	10 runs	
12	1 Aug 2004	Worcestershire; County Ground, New Road, Worcester	Lost	111 runs	
13	3 Aug 2004	Leicestershire; County Ground, Derby	No Result		
14	8 Aug 2004	Sussex; County Ground, Hove	Lost	84 runs	
15	10 Aug 2004	Yorkshire; Headingley, Leeds	Won	29 runs	
16	18 Aug 2004	Nottinghamshire; County Ground, Derby	Lost	24 runs	
17	29 Aug 2004	Yorkshire; County Ground, Derby	Lost	5 wickets	
18	5 Sep 2004	Scotland; Grange Cricket Club Ground, Raeburn Place, Edinburgh	Lost	8 wickets	

=== Cheltenham and Gloucester Trophy ===
List of matches
No.	Date	V	Result	Margin	Notes
2nd Rnd	5 May 2004	Somerset; County Ground, Derby	Lost	14 runs	Cox 131; Francis 8-66

=== Other one day matches ===
List of matches
No.	Date	V	Result	Margin	Notes
1	16 Jun 2004	New Zealand; County Ground, Derby	Won	4 wickets	Fleming 102; Hassan Adnan 113

=== Twenty20 Cup ===
List of matches
No.	Date	V	Result	Margin	Notes
1	2 Jul 2004	Yorkshire; County Ground, Derby	Lost	1 wicket	
2	8 Jul 2004	Lancashire; County Ground, Derby	Lost	5 wickets	
3	9 Jul 2004	Nottinghamshire; Trent Bridge, Nottingham	Won	9 runs	
4	13 Jul 2004	Durham; Riverside Ground, Chester-le-Street	Won	4 wickets	
5	15 Jul 2004	Leicestershire; County Ground, Derby	Abandoned		

== Statistics ==
=== Competition batting averages ===
Name	H	County Championship						National League,						Cheltenham and Gloucester Trophy						Twenty20 Cup					
Name	H	M	I	Runs	HS	Ave	100	M	I	Runs	HS	Ave	100	M	I	Runs	HS	Ave	100	M	I	Runs	HS	Ave	100
CWG Bassano	R	14	22	814	123*	42.84	2	15	15	328	100*	23.42	1	1	1	18	18		4	4	43	30	10.75	018.00	0
AG Botha	L	10	17	302	52	20.13	0	10	8	95	24	15.83	0	1	1	4	4	4.00	0	4	3	21	13*	21.00	0
JDC Bryant	R	7	13	149	30	12.41	0	14	12	118	42	9.83	0							4	4	97	41	32.33	0
KJ Dean	L	7	10	117	35	19.50	0	6	5	7	6	1.75	0												
NRC Dumelow	R	3	4	36	18	9.00	0	13	8	60	26	8.57	0	1	1	5	5	5.00	0	1	0				
BJ France	L	4	7	126	56	18.00	0	1	1	13	13	13.00	0												
AI Gait	R	12	22	425	81	20.23	0	6	6	116	49	23.20	0	1	1	17	17	17.00	0						
LJ Goddard	R	1	1	8	8	8.00	0																		
NEL Gunter	L							2	1	4	4	4.00	0							1	0				
Hassan Adnan	R	16	28	1247	140	51.95	3	18	17	395	57	26.33	0	1	1	78	78	78.00	0	4	4	61	32	15.25	0
PMR Havell	L	6	8	30	13*	15.00	0	3	3	8	4	2.66	0							1	0				
DR Hewson	R	2	2	9	9	4.50	0	7	6	34	23*	8.50	0	1	1	7	7	7.00	0	3	2	26	21	13.00	0
ID Hunter	R	1	2	6	6	3.00	0																		
RM Khan	R							1	1	2	2	2.00	0												
Mohammad Ali	L	4	6	110	50	22.00	0	13	5	12	6	3.00	0	1	1	17	17*		0	4	0				
J Moss	R	11	19	608	147*	35.76	1	15	14	439	104	36.58	1	1	1	6	6	6.00	0	4	4	148	68	37.00	0
CD Paget	R	3	2	7	7	3.50	0																		
DBL Powell	R	1	2	30	17	15.00	0	1	1	18	18*		0												
CJL Rogers	L	6	11	498	156	55.33	1	3	3	41	27	13.66	0	1	1	93	93	93.00	0						
SA Selwood	L	3	6	63	38	10.50	0	5	4	108	55	27.00	0												
M A Sheikh	L	13	18	259	42	21.58	0	14	10	112	50*	22.40	0							4	1	0	0*		0
BL Spendlove								4	4	19	13	4.75	0												
SD Stubbings	L	14	25	643	96	26.79	0	3	3	35	23	11.66	0												
LD Sutton	R	15	25	684	131	31.09	1	17	15	231	58*	19.25	0	1	1	0	0	0.00	0	4	4	53	19*	17.66	0
DK Taylor	L							3	2	38	29	19.00	0							3	3	29	15	9.66	0
NGE Walker	R	7	7	201	80	50.25	0	6	4	73	43	18.25	0												
G Welch	R	16	25	609	115*	29.00	1	18	14	276	82	21.23	0	1	1	22	22	22.00	0	3	3	31	15*	31.00	0

Leading first-class batsmen for Derbyshire by runs scored
Name	Mat	Inns	Runs	HS	Ave	100
Hassan Adnan	18	31	1380	140	51.11	3
CWG Bassano	14	22	814	123*	42.84	2
LD Sutton	16	27	747	131	31.12	1
SD Stubbings	16	28	743	96	27.51	0
G Welch	16	25	609	115*	29.00	1

Leading List A batsmen for Derbyshire by runs scored
Name	Mat	Inns	Runs	HS	Ave	100
Hassan Adnan	20	19	586	113*	35.73	1
J Moss	17	16	475	104	36.38	1
CWG Bassano	17	17	364	100*	23.66	1
G Welch	20	16	306	82	21.28	0
LD Sutton	19	17	272	58*	20.84	0

Leading Twenty20 batsmen for Derbyshire by runs scored
Name	Mat	Inns	Runs	HS	Ave	100
J Moss	4	4	148	68	37.00	0
JDC Bryant	4	4	97	41	32.33	0
Hassan Adnan	4	4	61	32	15.25	0
LD Sutton	4	4	53	19*	17.66	0
CWG Bassano	4	4	43	30	10.75	0

=== Competition bowling averages ===
Name	H	County Championship					National League					Cheltenham and Gloucester Trophy					Twenty20 Cup				
Name	H	Balls	Runs	Wkts	Best	Ave	Balls	Runs	Wkts	Best	Ave	Balls	Runs	Wkts	Best	Ave	Balls	Runs	Wkts	Best	Ave
AG Botha	LS	1512	874	21	4-66	41.61	402	285	12	3-24	23.75	30	28	0			66	77	3	2-28	25.66
KJ Dean	LF	864	597	20	5-86	29.85	249	208	2	1-42	104.00										
NRC Dumelow	RO	516	306	2	1-52	153.00	449	459	10	2-37	45.90	54	55	0			12	17	1	1-17	17.00
BJ France	RM	24	20	0																	
NEL Gunter							42	57	2	2-34	28.50						6	14	0		
Hassan Adnan	RO	225	154	1	1-4	154.00	115	107	3	2-13	35.66						24	31	1	1-18	31.00
PMR Havell	RF	733	640	16	4-75	40.00	101	79	3	3-28	26.33						24	32	2	2-32	16.00
DR Hewson	RM	276	112	4	3-39	28.00	155	177	5	2-33	35.40	36	37	0			18	22	1	1-22	22.00
ID Hunter	RM	87	52	3	3-32	17.33															
RM Khan							12	20	0												
Mohammad Ali	LM	700	486	10	4-75	48.60	517	416	17	3-22	24.47	60	63	0			90	95	10	3-24	9.50
J Moss	RM	1241	643	13	3-30	49.46	476	431	11	4-45	39.18	60	56	0			66	73	2	1-16	36.50
CD Paget	R	216	137	0																	
DBL Powell	RM	175	132	2	2-85	66.00	24	24	1	1-24	24.00										
M A Sheikh	RM	1791	945	26	4-9	36.34	432	372	12	3-25	31.00						61	52	3	2-20	17.33
NGE Walker	RM	824	574	17	5-68	33.76	36	30	1	1-19	30.00										
G Welch	RM	2831	1525	45	5-57	33.88	852	562	18	4-26	31.22	60	38	3	3-38	12.66	66	71	2	1-23	35.50

Leading first class bowlers for Derbyshire by wickets taken
Name	Balls	Runs	Wkts	BBI	Ave
G Welch	2831	1525	45	5-57	33.88
AG Botha	1746	938	26	5-55	36.07
M A Sheikh	1791	945	26	4-9	36.34
KJ Dean	864	597	20	5-86	29.85
NGE Walker	908	667	18	5-68	37.05

Leading List A bowlers for Derbyshire by wickets taken
Name	Balls	Runs	Wkts	BBI	Ave
G Welch	972	639	22	4-26	29.23
Mohammad Ali	637	534	19	3-22	32.38
AG Botha	480	352	14	3-24	25.14
M A Sheikh	480	406	13	3-25	30.23
J Moss	590	538	11	4-45	46.00

Leading Twenty20 bowlers for Derbyshire by wickets taken
Name	Balls	Runs	Wkts	BBI	Ave
Mohammad Ali	90	95	10	3-24	9.50
M A Sheikh	61	52	3	2-20	17.33
AG Botha	66	77	3	2-28	25.66
PMR Havell	24	32	2	2-32	16.00
G Welch	66	71	2	1-23	35.50
J Moss	66	73	2	1-16	36.50

=== Wicket Keeping ===
Luke Sutton

County Championship Catches 30, Stumping 3
PRO40 Catches 19, Stumping 1
Cheltenham and Gloucester Catches, Stumping
Twenty20 Catches 4, Stumping 2

Lee Goddard

County Championship Catches 5, Stumping 0

== See also ==
- Derbyshire County Cricket Club seasons
- 2004 English cricket season
