= Derbyshire County Cricket Club in 2008 =

2008 season of an English cricket team

Derbyshire County Cricket Club seasons
2008 season
- Captain: Rikki Clarke
- County Championship: Div 2 – 6
- Pro40: Div 2 – 8
- Friends Provident Trophy: North – 3
- Twenty20 Cup.: North – 5
- Most runs: Chris Rogers
- Most wickets: Graham Wagg
- Most catches: James Pipe

Derbyshire County Cricket Club in 2008 was the cricket season when the English club Derbyshire had been playing for one hundred and thirty-seven years. In the County Championship, they finished sixth in the second division. In the Pro40 league, they finished eighth in the second division. They were eliminated at group level in the Friends Provident Trophy and in the Twenty20 Cup.

== 2008 season ==
Derbyshire was in Division 2 of the County Championship and finished in sixth position. In addition to the Championship, they played first class matches against Durham University and the touring Bangladesh A side. Of their eighteen first class games, they won four and lost four, the remainder being drawn. Derbyshire was in Division 2 of the NatWest Pro40 League in which they won one of their eight matches and tied another to finish eighth in the division. In the Friends Provident Trophy Derbyshire played in the Northern group, coming third in the table with three wins. In the Twenty20 Cup, Derbyshire played in the North Division and won three matches to finish fifth in the division. Rikki Clarke was captain. Chris Rogers was top scorer with three centuries. Graham Wagg took most wickets overall, closely followed by Charl Langeveldt who was ahead only in the Friends Provident Trophy.

== Matches ==
=== First Class ===
List of matches
No.	Date	V	Result	Margin	Notes
1	12 Apr 2008	Durham University; County Ground, Derby	Drawn		
2	16 Apr 2008	Gloucestershire; County Ground, Bristol	Drawn		CJL Rogers 114
3	23 Apr 2008	Essex; County Ground, Derby	Won	4 wickets	Bopara 137
4	7 May 2008	Warwickshire; County Ground, Derby	Drawn		Trott 104; FA Klokker 103
5	14 May 2008	Glamorgan; The SWALEC Stadium, Cardiff	Drawn		Rees 104; Hemp 104; CK Langeveldt 5-100
6	30 May 2008	Middlesex; Lord's Cricket Ground, St John's Wood	Lost	6 wickets	
7	6 Jun 2008	Worcestershire; Queen's Park, Chesterfield	Won	Innings and 95 runs	DJ Pipe 133; Jones 5-74
8	29 Jun 2008	Essex; The Ford County Ground, Chelmsford	Lost	145 runs	ten Doeschate 118
9	11 Jul 2008	Leicestershire; County Ground, Derby	Drawn		
10	16 Jul 2008	Northamptonshire; County Ground, Northampton	Drawn		JL Clare 129 and 7-74; GG Wagg 108
11	21 Jul 2008	Bangladesh A cricket team County Ground, Derby	Lost	1 wicket	CJL Rogers 101; Dean 6-46
12	30 Jul 2008	Northamptonshire; Queen's Park, Chesterfield	Drawn		Klusener 135; Peters 104; CK Langeveldt 5-52; Hall 5-81
13	6 Aug 2008	Worcestershire; County Ground, New Road, Worcester	Drawn		Hick 149; Moore 156; Jones 5-110
14	12 Aug 2008	Middlesex; County Ground, Derby	Won	7 wickets	GM Smith 113; CK Langeveldt 5-40
15	27 Aug 2008	Warwickshire; Edgbaston, Birmingham	Drawn		Trott 181; CJL Rogers 248; Maddy 138; Salisbury 5-99
16	2 Sep 2008	Glamorgan; County Ground, Derby	Drawn		Rees 126; GG Wagg 5-112
17	17 Sep 2008	Gloucestershire; County Ground, Derby	Won	117 runs	Brown 5-38; GG Wagg 6-56
18	24 Sep 2008	Leicestershire; Grace Road, Leicester	Lost	8 wickets	Kruger 5-51; J Needham 6-49

=== NatWest Pro40 League ===
List of matches
No.	Date	V	Result	Margin	Notes
1	20 Jul 2008	Northamptonshire; County Ground, Northampton	Won	6 wickets	
2	28 Jul 2008	Essex; County Ground, Derby	Lost	25 runs	Gallian 108; Bopara 112
3	3 Aug 2008	Surrey; Queen's Park, Chesterfield	Lost	13 runs	Dernbach 5-31
4	18 Aug 2008	Kent; St Lawrence Ground, Canterbury	Lost	9 wickets	
5	21 Aug 2008	Yorkshire; County Ground, Derby	Tied		
6	25 Aug 2008	Leicestershire; Grace Road, Leicester	Lost	6 runs	
7	8 Sep 2008	Glamorgan; The SWALEC Stadium, Cardiff	Lost	50 runs	
8	13 Sep 2008	Warwickshire; County Ground, Derby	Lost	29 runs	

=== Friends Provident Trophy ===
List of matches
No.	Date	V	Result	Margin	Notes
1	20 Apr 2008	Lancashire; Old Trafford, Manchester	Abandoned		
2	27 Apr 2008	Yorkshire; Headingley, Leeds	Lost	25 runs	
3	2 May 2008	Durham; County Ground, Derby	Won	1 run	
4	4 May 2008	Scotland; County Ground, Derby	Won	6 wickets	
5	22 May 2008	Lancashire; County Ground, Derby	Won	100 runs	
6	25 May 2008	Yorkshire; County Ground, Derby	No result		
7	26 May 2008	Durham; Riverside Ground, Chester-le-Street	Lost	117 runs	Di Venuto 138; Breese 5-41
8	28 May 2008	Scotland; Titwood, Glasgow	Abandoned		

=== Twenty20 Cup ===
List of matches
No.	Date	V	Result	Margin	Notes
1	11 Jun 2008	Durham; Riverside Ground, Chester-le-Street	Lost	5 wickets	Collingwood 5-14
2	12 Jun 2008	Yorkshire; Headingley, Leeds	Won	47 runs	GM Smith 100
3	13 Jun 2008	Lancashire; County Ground, Derby	Lost	10 wickets	
4	15 Jun 2008	Yorkshire; Queen's Park, Chesterfield	Lost	11 runs	
5	16 Jun 2008	Nottinghamshire; Trent Bridge, Nottingham	Won	3 wickets	
6	20 Jun 2008	Nottinghamshire; County Ground, Derby	Lost	8 wickets	
7	22 Jun 2008	Leicestershire; County Ground, Derby	Won	7 wickets	
8	23 Jun 2008	Lancashire; Old Trafford, Manchester	Lost	9 wickets	
9	25 Jun 2008	Durham; County Ground, Derby	Lost	7 wickets	
10	27 Jun 2008	Leicestershire; Grace Road, Leicester	Lost	23 runs	Allenby 5-27

== Statistics ==
=== Competition batting averages ===
Name	H	County Championship						Pro40 league,						Friends Provident Trophy						Twenty20 Cup					
Name	H	M	I	Runs	HS	Ave	100	M	I	Runs	HS	Ave	100	M	I	Runs	HS	Ave	100	M	I	Runs	HS	Ave	100
Batsmen
PM Borrington	R	8	13	324	85	27.00	0																		
WW Hinds	L	9	13	407	76	31.30	0	8	8	218	84	27.25	0							10	10	283	72*	35.37	0
DJ Birch	L	11	18	609	77	35.82	0	5	5	132	76	26.40	0	3	2	38	23	19.00	0	10	9	108	25	15.42	0
FD Telo	R	7	14	263	69	18.78	0	2	2	39	39	19.50	0	3	3	31	15*	31.00	0	8	8	134	33	16.75	0
JL Sadler	L	6	11	195	49	17.72	0	4	4	90	31	22.50	0	6	5	119	46	29.75	0	6	5	38	25	7.60	0
CJL Rogers	L	14	24	1232	248*	56.00	3	8	8	246	61	30.75	0	6	5	228	94	45.60	0						
DJ Redfern	L	4	6	159	69*	31.80	0	4	4	125	57*	41.66	0	1	0					1	1	9	9	9.00	0
SD Stubbings	L	9	17	499	62*	33.26	0							6	5	207	95*	51.75	0						
All-rounders
R Clarke	R	10	16	317	81	19.81	0	6	6	148	69	29.60	0	6	5	93	33	18.60	0	9	9	121	36	15.12	0
GM Smith	R	11	18	575	113	33.82	1	8	8	116	35*	16.57	0							10	10	275	100*	30.55	1
GG Wagg	R	15	22	498	108	26.21	1	7	6	43	15	7.16	0	5	4	34	15	8.50	0	10	8	96	27*	24.00	0
WA White	R	3	5	38	18	9.50	0	3	3	18	10	9.00	0												
RA Whiteley	L	1	2	45	27	22.50	0	1	1	24	24	24.00	0												
Wicket-keepers
FA Klokker	L	4	8	160	103*	22.85	1							3	1	11	11	11.00	0						
DJ Pipe	R	8	14	453	133	41.18	1	3	2	12	9	6.00	0	3	3	35	20	35.00	0	10	9	162	45	20.25	0
TJ New	L	6	8	224	58	32.00	0	5	5	109	39	36.33	0												
Bowlers
JL Clare	R	13	18	555	129*	42.69	1	6	4	34	18	8.50	0	6	4	36	14	9.00	0	6	3	10	4*	5.00	0
KJ Dean	L	2	3	36	25	18.00	0	1	1	0	0*		0							2	1	0	0	0.00	0
ID Hunter	R	4	5	28	17	7.00	0	6	3	33	24	16.50	0												
T Lungley	L	4	4	108	50	36.00	0							6	2	5	3	2.50	0	1	0				
J Needham	R	7	12	135	36	19.28	0	2	2	19	12*	19.00	0	4	2	7	7*		0	10	4	16	7*	8.00	0
ND Doshi	R	7	7	6	2	1.20	0	6	3	3	3*	3.00	0	2	0					10	2	6	5	3.00	0
CK Langeveldt	R	12	15	208	40	17.33	0	3	3	2	1	1.00	0	6	2	32	26	16.00	0	7	4	7	3*	7.00	0
MAK Lawson	R	1	2	8	5	8.00	0																		

=== Competition bowling averages ===
Name	H	County Championship					Pro40 league,					Friends Provident Trophy					Twenty20 Cup				
Name	H	Balls	Runs	Wkts	Best	Ave	Balls	Runs	Wkts	Best	Ave	Balls	Runs	Wkts	Best	Ave	Balls	Runs	Wkts	Best	Ave
PM Borrington	RF	6	5	0																	
R Clarke	RF	788	522	11	4-87	47.45	70	68	3	2-30	22.66	102	76	2	1-14	38.00	135	182	6	2-32	30.33
JL Clare	RF	1546	871	31	7-74	28.09	216	253	4	1-12	63.25	258	190	6	3-39	31.66	53	72	2	2-20	36.00
KJ Dean	LF	255	154	4	4-28	38.50	48	24	1	1-24	24.00						42	55	2	2-22	27.50
ND Doshi	LS	1273	648	8	2-69	81.00	210	167	3	2-47	55.66	102	58	1	1-26	58.00	202	198	8	3-1	24.75
WW Hinds	RF	528	261	10	3-22	26.10	192	193	5	2-43	38.60						108	124	4	2-14	31.00
ID Hunter	RF	662	303	6	2-62	50.50	246	202	10	3-18	20.20										
FA Klokker	R	60	99	0																	
CK Langeveldt	RF	2509	1238	55	5-40	22.50	108	97	3	3-38	32.33	277	200	13	4-28	15.38	126	118	8	4-9	14.75
T Lungley	RF	511	326	9	4-70	36.22						265	218	8	3-31	27.25	18	34	0		11.33
J Needham	RO	811	410	16	6-49	25.62	48	30	1	1-30	30.00	103	115	3	2-42	38.33	126	172	4	1-4	43.00
DJ Redfern	RO	108	54	1	1-7	54.00	72	64	0												
CJL Rogers	LL	22	13	0																	
JL Sadler	RL	60	57	1	1-57	57.00											24	34	0		
GM Smith	RF	693	428	8	1-7	53.50	108	117	2	1-14	58.50										
SD Stubbings	RO	36	42	0																	
FD Telo	RF	30	36	1	1-36	36.00															
GG Wagg	LM	2652	1547	57	6-56	27.14	282	268	6	3-34	44.66	246	171	11	4-35	15.54	192	254	8	3-23	31.75
WA White	RF	408	296	5	2-66	59.20	90	101	3	3-47	33.66										
RA Whiteley		66	38	0			12	12	0												

=== Wicket Keeping ===
James Pipe

County Championship Catches 21, Stumping 2
PRO40 Catches 2, Stumping 1
Friends Provident Catches 9, Stumping 0
Twenty20 Catches 3, Stumping 2

Tom New

County Championship Catches 12 Stumping 2

Frederik Klokker

County Championship Catches 10
PRO40 Catches 4 Stumping 0

== See also ==
- Derbyshire County Cricket Club seasons
- 2008 English cricket season
