= Richard Hodgkinson =

English cricketer (born 1983)

Richard Hodgkinson (born 9 December 1983) is an English cricketer. He is a right-handed batsman and a right-arm medium-fast bowler.

Born in Mansfield, Hodgkinson joined Nottinghamshire in 2003, but failed to achieve a first-team debut for some time due to a serious ankle injury.

He left Nottinghamshire in 2005. In 2007, Hodgkinson played his first game for Derbyshire.
