= Richard Browning (cricketer) =

English cricketer

Richard James Browning (born 9 October 1987) is an English cricketer. He was a right-handed batsman and right-arm medium-pace bowler who played for Derbyshire. He was born in Wolverhampton.

Browning began his career playing for Derbyshire Second XI in, for whom he played between 2005 and 2006. He made his only List A appearance during the 2006 season, against Worcestershire. From the tailend, Browning scored 2 runs, and he took figures of 0–26 from three overs of bowling.

As of 2008, Browning still plays for Derbyshire in the Second XI Championship.
