= Jonathan Moss (cricketer) =

Australian cricketer (born 1975)

Personal information
- Born: 4 May 1975 (age 51); Manly, New South Wales, Australia
- Nickname: Mossy
- Height: 1.85 m (6 ft 1 in)
- Batting: Right-handed
- Bowling: Right arm medium
- Role: All-rounder

Domestic team information
- Years: Team
- 2000/01–2006/07: Victoria
- 2004–2005: Derbyshire
- FC debut: 9 March 2001 Victoria v New South Wales
- Last FC: 15 February 2007 Victoria v Tasmania
- LA debut: 26 January 2001 Victoria v Queensland
- Last LA: 25 February 2007 Victoria v Queensland

Career statistics
Competition	FC	LA	T20
Matches	83	101	19
Runs scored	4,482	2,505	436
Batting average	35.01	28.79	31.14
100s/50s	7/30	1/18	0/2
Top score	172*	104	83
Balls bowled	9,494	3,555	198
Wickets	131	88	7
Bowling average	33.93	31.51	38.85
5 wickets in innings	0	1	0
10 wickets in match	0	0	0
Best bowling	4/35	5/47	1/6
Catches/stumpings	39/–	33/–	4/–
- Source: CricketArchive, 25 September 2008

Jonathan Moss (born 4 May 1975) is an Australian cricketer. He is a right-handed batsman and a right-arm medium-pace bowler, who played for the Victorian Bushrangers from season 2000/01 to 2006/07.

== Biography ==
Moss was born in Sydney, where his parents had emigrated to from England only a few years before, and is Jewish. He was educated at SCEGS in North Sydney(Shore School), and was in the 1st IX and 1st XV. His older brother, Phil Moss, was born in London, and has been notable in Australian soccer circles as both a player and a manager.

Prior to his first-class debut, Moss played for Australia in the 1997 Maccabiah Games in Israel, a competition in which the best Jewish sportsmen from around the world compete representing their country. The bridge collapsed as Moss and the Australian team was walking on the bridge in Tel Aviv on the way to the opening games, killing four people. Moss fell into the river.

== Early career ==
The Sydney native first played cricket for Hampshire's Second XI in one game in 2000, before moving back to his home country and playing for Victoria, as he was unable to crack the New South Wales squad. His performance as a middle-order batsman in the Victorian team assisted them to the finals of the 2000–01 and 2003–04 Pura Cup finals; Moss averaged around 60 for the tournament.

Moss then moved to England, where he appeared almost two months later for Derbyshire for the first time. He struggled to make himself a part of the first team during his first two seasons at the club, and made a failed transfer request to return to New South Wales.

== Later highlights ==
In season 2005/06 international selection was suggested by numerous journalists (such as Darren Berry), after a strong start to the season with both bat and ball, but his age of 32 was seen as a barrier, and it never eventuated. However, he finished off an excellent season with 295 runs (at an average of 29.50) in the ING Cup, and 413 (at an average of 27) runs in the Pura Cup, plus 20 wickets in the same competition, as Victoria made the Pura Cup final.

In 2006/07 he faced an inconsistent season in Pura Cup cricket, scoring just 149 runs (at an average of 18.62), whilst his medium pacers proved handy, taking 14 wickets (at 28.14) in a decent return, but it was not enough to make Moss a permanent fixture, and he was in and out of the side at times. Moss was more consistent in the renamed Ford Ranger (OD) cup, scoring 344 runs (at 31.27), playing every match, but failing to score a century.

Moss is also an accomplished golfer, playing off single figures and taking the trophy at this year's Tin Cup XI Golf Tournament at the Mollymook Hilltops Golf Club on the NSW South Coast.

At the end of his agreed one-year contract it was amicably agreed to part ways with Victoria and he returned to Sydney in 2007, bringing to a close a career which featured 4482 first-class runs (at 35.01), with 7 centuries and 30 half centuries, the honour of being vice captain and stand in captain, in a match which brought upon his highest ever FC score of 172 (not out), and 131 wickets (at 33.93) in FC cricket as well.

On his return, he played for Sydney Cricket Club (formerly UTS Balmain) in Sydney Grade Cricket. By 2011, he was working with Puma Australia, delivering motivational speeches and serving as a member of the Fox Sports cricket commentary team.[1]

== See also ==
- List of select Jewish cricketers
