= Ben France =

English cricketer (born 1982)

Personal information
- Full name: Benjamin John France
- Born: 14 May 1982 (age 44); Brunei
- Batting: Left-handed
- Bowling: Right-arm medium-fast
- Role: Batsman
- Website: www.benfrancecricket.co.uk

Domestic team information
- Years: Team
- 2000: Oxfordshire
- 2003–2012: Suffolk
- 2004–2005: Derbyshire
- 2013–2018: Norfolk
- FC debut: 19 August 2004 Derbyshire v Notts
- Last FC: 16 September 2005 Derbyshire v Yorkshire
- LA debut: 28 August 2003 Suffolk v Devon
- Last LA: 25 September 2005 Derbyshire v Somerset

Career statistics
Competition	First-class	List A
Matches	11	3
Runs scored	315	52
Batting average	15.75	17.33
100s/50s	0/2	0/0
Top score	56	31
Balls bowled	120	0
Wickets	1	–
Bowling average	90.00	–
5 wickets in innings	0	–
10 wickets in match	0	–
Best bowling	1/37	–
Catches/stumpings	5/–	0/–
- Source: CricInfo, 24 June 2019

Benjamin John France (born 14 May 1982) is a former professional cricketer who has played first-class and List A cricket for Derbyshire County Cricket Club.

Born in Brunei, France was educated at Bromsgrove School in Worcestershire. He played both cricket and rugby union at school and represented the England under-18 rugby side at fly-half. He played one Minor Counties Trophy match for Oxfordshire in 2000 and two for Worcestershire Cricket Board in 2001 before playing Second XI matches for Middlesex, Kent, and Essex.

After moving to the county, France played for Suffolk from 2003 and was the second highest run scorer in the Minor Counties Championship in 2004. He made his debut for Derbyshire in 2004 and was voted 2nd XI player of the year during the season, but was released in 2006 after making 14 senior appearances for the county. He continued to play for Suffolk and worked as a cricket and rugby coach at Ipswich School and was the cricket professional at Framlingham College. He went on to play for Norfolk, working as a cricket coach and teacher in the county.
