= Dan Birch =

English cricketer (born 1981)

Daniel Birch
Personal information
- Full name: Daniel John Birch
- Born: 21 January 1981 (age 45); Nottingham, England
- Height: 6 ft 3 in (1.91 m)
- Batting: Left-handed
- Bowling: Right-arm medium-fast
- Relatives: John Birch (father)

Domestic team information
- Years: Team
- 2007–2008: Derbyshire
- 2010–2013: Lincolnshire

Career statistics
Competition	FC	LA	T20
Matches	16	16	11
Runs scored	888	369	116
Batting average	34.15	24.60	14.50
100s/50s	1/4	0/2	0/0
Top score	130	76	25
Catches/stumpings	4/0	2/0	2/0
- Source: Cricinfo.com, 11 March 2009

Daniel John Birch (born 21 January 1981) is a cricketer born at Nottingham, who made 130 on his first-class debut for Derbyshire in April 2007. He also scored 95 on his Championship debut against Gloucestershire.

Prior to signing for Derbyshire, Birch had been playing Premier League Club Cricket in the county before Kent signed him in 2006, however he never made the first team and signed for Derbyshire soon after. In 2010, he joined Lincolnshire to play minor counties cricket.
