= Andy Gray (cricketer) =

Australian cricketer

Andy Gray (born Andrew Kenneth Donovan Gray, 19 May 1974, Western Australia) is an Australian first-class cricketer, born to English parents. He is a right-handed batsman and a right-arm off-break bowler. He made his first-class debut for Yorkshire in 2001, against Northamptonshire, scoring a duck, his only batting contribution during the match.

Despite Yorkshire's 2002 relegation from Division One of the County Championship, Gray played with them until 2004. The next year, he moved to Derbyshire, where he remained until 2006. He again made a duck in his first innings for the team. Gray represented both Yorkshire and Derbyshire in Twenty20 cricket. In total, he played in thirty-four first-class matches, forty-nine one day games and sixteen Twenty20 games.

Latterly, Gray represented Shifnal Cricket Club, who play in the Birmingham Premier League. In 2010 and 2011, Gray played in the Minor Counties Championship for Shropshire.

Gray joined the Great Boulder Cricket Club in the 2014/15 season and is now the captain. He led them into a Grand Final on 25 March 2017.
