= Luke Sutton =

English cricketer (born 1976)

Personal information
- Full name: Luke David Sutton
- Born: 4 October 1976 (age 50); Keynsham, Somerset, England
- Height: 5 ft 11 in (1.80 m)
- Batting: Right-handed
- Role: Wicketkeeper

Domestic team information
- Years: Team
- 1997–1998: Somerset
- 2000–2005: Derbyshire
- 2006–2010: Lancashire
- 2011: Derbyshire

Career statistics
| Competition | FC | LA | T20 |
|---|---|---|---|
| Matches | 176 | 167 | 30 |
| Runs scored | 7,353 | 2,080 | 309 |
| Batting average | 30.63 | 19.25 | 22.07 |
| 100s/50s | 11/20 | 0/6 | 0/1 |
| Top score | 151* | 83 | 61* |
| Catches/stumpings | 467/24 | 185/27 | 12/12 |
- Source: Cricinfo, 28 April 2012

Luke David Sutton (born 4 October 1976) is an English former cricketer. A former right-handed batsman and wicketkeeper, he won the NBC Denis Compton Award in 2000, 2001 and 2002, and has also played List A and Twenty20 cricket.

== Education ==
Sutton attended Millfield School and then Durham University, where he was in the same year as Andrew Strauss.

== Career ==
=== Somerset:1996–1999 ===
Sutton joined Somerset as a junior, playing for the club in 1997 and 1998, and the second II in 1999.

=== Derbyshire: 2000–2005 ===
In 2000 he moved to Derbyshire, later given the task of captain after Dominic Cork moved to Lancashire and Michael Di Venuto moved back to Australia due to an injured back. Sutton kept wicket for the Derbyshire team and provided solid middle-order batsmanship.

=== Lancashire: 2006–2010 ===
He signed for Lancashire in 2006 as a replacement for Warren Hegg. On 9 August 2006, Sutton recorded his first century for Lancashire in the Roses match against Yorkshire, accumulating an unbeaten 151. This is a record as the highest scoring wicket keeper in a Roses match.

Lancashire awarded Sutton his county cap in April 2007.

=== Return to Derbyshire: 2011 ===
Towards the end of the 2010 season, it was announced that Sutton would be leaving Lancashire and was looking to join other clubs. Shortly after, Sutton signed a contract with Derbyshire. Three months after Sutton's return to Derbyshire was announced, he was appointed captain, taking over from Australian Chris Rogers who left the club. In May 2011, a month into the season, Derbyshire's head of cricket, John Morris, left the club. Sutton was left with a more prominent role in managing the team till the end of the season. In an effort to improve on their last-place finish in the 2010 County Championship, Derbyshire introduced several new players. The team finished fifth in the Second Division in 2011 and third in their CB40 group. Sutton's successful leadership of an inexperienced team was generally praised.

== Retirement ==
In early December 2011, Sutton retired from all forms of cricket, in part because of his admitted battle with depression.

Sporting positions
| Preceded by Dominic Cork | Derbyshire County Cricket Club captain 2004–2005 | Succeeded by Graeme Welch |
| Preceded by Greg Smith | Derbyshire County Cricket Club captain 2011 | Succeeded by Wayne Madsen |
