= Wayne White (cricketer) =

English cricketer

Personal information
- Full name: Wayne Andrew White
- Born: 22 September 1985 (age 41); Derby, England
- Height: 6 ft 2 in (1.88 m)
- Batting: Right-handed
- Bowling: Right-arm medium-fast
- Role: All-rounder

Domestic team information
- Years: Team
- 2005–2008: Derbyshire
- 2009–2012: Leicestershire (squad no. 35)
- 2013–2014: Lancashire (squad no. 25)
- 2015: Derbyshire (squad no. 25)
- 2015–2016: Leicestershire (squad no. 35)

Career statistics
Competition	FC	LA	T20
Matches	86	69	61
Runs scored	2,769	783	387
Batting average	24.28	19.09	14.88
100s/50s	1/14	0/0	0/0
Top score	101*	46*	26
Balls bowled	10,690	2,275	856
Wickets	202	66	36
Bowling average	33.70	37.21	37.50
5 wickets in innings	7	1	0
10 wickets in match	0	0	0
Best bowling	6/25	6/29	3/21
Catches/stumpings	25/–	15/–	29/–
- Source: Wisden, 15 February 2023

Wayne Andrew White (born 22 September 1985) is an English former cricketer. He was a right-handed batsman and a right-arm medium-pace bowler. He was born at Derby and played for Derbyshire until the end of the 2008 season. He was released and Leicestershire signed him on trial. He impressed in pre-season and was subsequently signed, ending up spending the majority of the rest of his career there over two spells until his abrupt retirement at the age of 30.

== Cricket career ==
White made his Second XI Championship debut for Derbyshire against Lancashire's Second XI, making his first appearance as the eleventh man from twelve, as Zimbabwean Test cricketer Travis Friend was to retire hurt in the first innings.

White played consistently for the Second XI in 2005, and played his first match for the senior Derbyshire team in September 2005, just following the end of the Second XI Championship season. In the second innings of his first match, lower order and tailend batsmen Ant Botha and Nick Walker made 156* and 79 respectively, culminating in a ninth-wicket partnership for the team of 133.

White was ruled out for the vast majority of the 2006 season due to a double stress fracture to his back. He made his only appearance of the season on the last day, picking up a four-wicket haul in his first innings.

In 2009, he joined Leicestershire where he made 51 first-class appearances over 4 seasons. In the 2012 County Championship, White scored the then fastest first-class fifty by balls faced of all time (until 8 November 2025, when Akash Kumar Choudhary blasted 8 consecutive sixes to reach 50 in a mere 11 balls - Ranji Trophy Plate Group match between Meghalaya and Arunachal Pradesh in Surat) by reaching the half-century mark in just 12 balls. In the same innings, his batting partner Ned Eckersley scored 50 off 14 balls and finished not-out on 70 off 19 balls. He scored 2,139 runs and took 108 wickets in total in his first spell and earned himself a county cap which was awarded on the final afternoon of the 2012 season. He left following the completion of that season - a surprise to coach Phil Whitticase - to join Lancashire.

After an unsuccessful 2 years with the Red Roses, White rejoined Derbyshire on a one-year contract for the 2015 season but, after making just 3 first-class appearances, left in August to rejoin Leicestershire. The following July, he announced his retirement at the age of just 30 following the mutual termination of his contract.
