= Jake Needham (cricketer) =

English cricketer

Personal information
- Born: 30 September 1986 (age 40); Portsmouth, England
- Height: 6 ft 1 in (1.85 m)
- Batting: Right-handed
- Bowling: Right-arm offbreak

Domestic team information
- Years: Team
- 2005–2012: Derbyshire

Career statistics
Competition	FC	LA	T20
Matches	19	42	14
Runs scored	384	224	16
Batting average	20.21	13.17	8.00
100s/50s	0/0	0/0	0/0
Top score	48	42	7*
Balls bowled	2,263	1,395	159
Wickets	35	26	8
Bowling average	36.22	46.46	26.50
5 wickets in innings	1	0	0
10 wickets in match	0	0	0
Best bowling	6/49	3/36	4/21
Catches/stumpings	10/–	13/–	4/–
- Source: Cricinfo, 1 April 2013

Jake Needham (born 30 September 1986) is an English cricketer. He is a right-handed batsman and a right-arm off-break bowler. He made his Derbyshire first team debut in 2006, having spent two years in the second team.

Having first appeared in a Second XI Trophy match, he later appeared in his debut first-team match against Essex, a match which he played on the same day as he was supposed to be receiving his A-level results.

Jake has recently been given a new two-year contract, seeing him stay at the county until at least 2010.

In October 2007, Needham traveled to Victoria, Australia, where he has accepted a one-season contract to play for club cricket side St. Mary's during the English Winter.

In May 2012, he retired from professional cricket after asking to be released from the final year of his contract with Derbyshire. He is still involved in club cricket at the highest level however and has been appointed captain of Ockbrook and Borrowash, who play in the Derbyshire Premier League in place of Kevin Dean, another Ex-Derbyshire player.
