= Paul Borrington =

English cricketer

Paul Michael Borrington (born 24 May 1988) is an English cricketer. He is a right-handed batsman and a right-arm off-break bowler who played for Derbyshire.

Despite a disappointing debut which saw him only score four runs, against Leicestershire before being dismissed, in September 2005, he later played his part in getting Derbyshire up to what was then their highest ever total of 707-7 declared, thanks to two innings in excess of 150 from Steve Stubbings and Hassan Adnan, against Somerset. He signed a three-year contract extension in July 2011.

Borrington's father, Anthony, also played first-class cricket for Derbyshire.
