= Graeme Welch =

English cricketer and coach

Personal information
- Full name: Graeme Welch
- Born: 21 March 1972 (age 54); Durham, England
- Height: 5 ft 11.5 in (1.82 m)
- Batting: Right-handed
- Bowling: Right arm medium

Domestic team information
- Years: Team
- 1994–2000: Warwickshire
- 1997/98: Wellington
- 2001–2006: Derbyshire

Career statistics
Competition	FC	LA	T20
Matches	171	224	24
Runs scored	5,075	2,582	152
Batting average	22.86	19.86	9.50
100s/50s	2/21	0/8	0/0
Top score	115*	82	20
Balls bowled	28,450	9,600	401
Wickets	477	197	11
Bowling average	31.51	35.57	55.72
5 wickets in innings	17	3	0
10 wickets in match	1	0	0
Best bowling	6/30	6/31	3/31
Catches/stumpings	73/–	32/–	3/–
- Source: CricketArchive, 8 September 2009

Graeme Welch (born 21 March 1972) is a former English cricket player and coach born in Durham. He played for two county teams, Derbyshire and Warwickshire.

Graeme Welch was appointed captain of Derbyshire for the 2006 season following the departure of Luke Sutton to Lancashire. In his Derbyshire career he has taken 50 wickets each season except one where he was injured for most of it, therefore it shows why he has taken 685 wickets at all top cricket levels and has also shown promise with the bat, scoring 7089 runs at all professional levels. When he played for Warwickshire he was part of the famous team including Shaun Pollock, Brian Lara and Dermot Reeve. He left Warwickshire at the end of the 2000 season, and joined Derbyshire for the 2001 campaign. Following six years of service for Derbyshire, Welsh was awarded a benefit year in 2007. However, in June 2007, he was forced to retire from the game due to injury.

Welch joined Essex as their bowling coach for 2008. He left Essex in 2010, to take up the same position at Warwickshire under Ashley Giles. He rejoined Derbyshire as elite performance director in January 2014, and resigned from the role in June 2016. From there, he spent a short spell as assistant coach at Leicestershire, before retaking his former position at Warwickshire in 2018, shortly after the return of Giles as Sport Director.

Sporting positions
Preceded by Luke Sutton	Derbyshire cricket captains 2006	Succeeded by Simon Katich
