= Ian Hunter (cricketer) =

English cricketer

Personal information
- Full name: Ian David Hunter
- Born: 11 September 1979 (age 47); Dryburn Hospital, Durham, England
- Nickname: Sticks
- Height: 6 ft 2 in (1.88 m)
- Batting: Right-handed
- Bowling: Right-arm medium-fast

Domestic team information
- Years: Team
- 1999–2003: Durham
- 2004: Cumberland
- 2004–2010: Derbyshire
- 2011: Northumberland

Career statistics
| Competition | FC | LA | T20 |
|---|---|---|---|
| Matches | 63 | 88 | 18 |
| Runs scored | 1,064 | 339 | 41 |
| Batting average | 17.73 | 8.47 | 10.25 |
| 100s/50s | 0/2 | 0/0 | 0/0 |
| Top score | 65 | 39 | 25* |
| Balls bowled | 9,805 | 3799 | 378 |
| Wickets | 150 | 96 | 19 |
| Bowling average | 38.90 | 32.68 | 28.52 |
| 5 wickets in innings | 3 | 0 | 0 |
| 10 wickets in match | 0 | 0 | 0 |
| Best bowling | 5/46 | 4/29 | 3/26 |
| Catches/stumpings | 18/– | 17/– | 3/– |
- Source: Cricinfo, 20 November 2022

Ian David Hunter (born 11 September 1979) is an English cricketer. He is a right-handed batsman and a right-arm medium-fast bowler.

Hunter first played for Durham during the 1997 Second XI Championship, taking a wicket in a draw against Hampshire's Second XI. He played consistently in the Second XI for six years. Hunter was released by Durham in 2003 and played briefly for Cumberland in the Minor Counties Championship Eastern Division, before being given a two-year contract by Derbyshire.

Hunter is colourblind and has admitted he finds playing cricket indoors to be a struggle.

In 1999 Hunter played in three youth Test matches against Australia Under-19s.
