= Steve Stubbings =

English cricketer and coach

Personal information
- Full name: Stephen David Stubbings
- Born: 31 March 1978 (age 48); Huddersfield, Yorkshire, England
- Nickname: Stubbo
- Height: 6 ft 3 in (1.91 m)
- Batting: Left-handed
- Bowling: Right-arm off-break

Domestic team information
- Years: Team
- 1997–2010: Derbyshire
- 2011–2013: Bedfordshire

Career statistics
Competition	FC	LA	T20
Matches	139	117	9
Runs scored	7,557	2,707	186
Batting average	31.88	26.28	23.25
100s/50s	12/38	1/16	0/2
Top score	151	110	57
Catches/stumpings	64/0	20/0	4/0
- Source: Cricinfo.com, 27 July 2009

Stephen David Stubbings (born 31 March 1978) is an English cricketer and coach who played first-class and List A cricket for Derbyshire from 1998 to 2009 and minor counties cricket for Bedfordshire (2011–2013).

He only played a handful of senior games before trying out at the Frankston Peninsula Cricket Club in the Victorian Cricket Association's Premier Competition. He made his 1st XI debut in the 1995/1996 season before playing in England in the summer of 1997.

In 2016 Stubbings was appointed as Derbyshire's First Eleven coach.
