= Kevin Dean (cricketer) =

English cricketer

Kevin James Dean (born 16 October 1975 in Derby) is an English cricketer. He is a left-handed batsman and a left-arm medium-fast bowler.

The imposing, 6'5" tall Dean made his club debut for the Derbyshire Phantoms in 1996 and received the Denis Compton Award in 1998. That year he took 74 wickets at 21.24, the fourth most first-class wickets in the English cricket season, behind only Courtney Walsh, Ed Giddins and Andy Caddick: he also helped Derbyshire to the NatWest Trophy final, bowling an important spell in the semi-final victory over Leicestershire. He achieved his best bowling figures of 8/52 in the 2000 season, otherwise achieving an average of a mere 25.65 throughout his first-class career, which spanned 100 matches.

He tried his hand at Twenty20 cricket in 2005, while turning in a couple of good performances before Derbyshire's exit in the second round of the C&G trophy of that year, also aiding them to the respectable position of quarter-finals in the Twenty20 cup.

Dean announced his retirement from first-class cricket at the end of the 2008 season after spending 15 years with Derbyshire.

In 2021 he appeared in an episode of The Chase.
