= May 2005 in sports =

<<	May 2005					>>
Su	Mo	Tu	We	Th	Fr	Sa
1	2	3	4	5	6	7
8	9	10	11	12	13	14
15	16	17	18	19	20	21
22	23	24	25	26	27	28
29	30	31
India; Sports

This list shows notable sports-related deaths, events, and notable outcomes that occurred in May of 2005.

== Deaths ==
- 30 – Takanohana Kenshi
- 30 – Fazal Mahmood
- 30 – Juan Pedro Villamán
- 26 – Chico Carrasquel
- 6 – Lee Stine
- 2 – Theofiel Middelkamp

== Ongoing events ==
- 2005 English cricket season
- 2005 ICC Intercontinental Cup
- 2005 in NASCAR
- 10 May–30 June: Cricket: Bangladesh tour England
- 15 May–7 June: Cricket: Pakistan tour West Indies
- 23 May–5 June: Tennis: French Open

== 30 May 2005 (Monday) ==
- 2005 English cricket season:
  - National League, Division One:
    - Lancashire (4pts) beat Gloucestershire (0pts) by 6 wickets
    - Northamptonshire (4pts) beat Hampshire (0pts) by 4 wickets
    - Essex (4pts) beat Nottinghamshire (0pts) by 6 wickets
    - Middlesex (4pts) beat Worcestershire (0pts) by 32 runs
  - National League, Division Two:
    - Derbyshire (4pts) beat Leicestershire (0pts) by 6 wickets
    - Sussex (4pts) beat Somerset(0pts) by 2 wickets
    - Surrey (4pts) beat Durham (0pts) by 43 runs
    - Yorkshire (4pts) beat Scotland (0pts) by 60 runs
- Football:
  - In the English Football League Championship playoff final to determine the last of three teams to earn promotion to the Premier League, West Ham United defeat Preston North End 1–0 at Millennium Stadium in Cardiff, Wales. (BBC)
  - Multiplex, the Australian company building the new Wembley Stadium in London announces that it will lose £45 million on the project, because of cost overruns and construction delays. The completion date is pushed back three months to March 2006, but the company repeats its assurance that the stadium will be ready to stage next year's FA Cup final in May. The company's executive chairman quit last Friday when the news first emerged. Multiplex has reduced its 2005 profits forecast from A$235 million to A$170 million. (Independent), (Australian Financial Review)

== 29 May 2005 (Sunday) ==
- 2005 English cricket season:
  - County Championship, Division Two:
    - Leicestershire (19pts) beat Derbyshire (5pts) by 4 wickets
  - National League, Division Two:
    - Durham (4pts) beat Kent (0pts) by 1 run
    - Scotland (4pts) beat Warwickshire (0pts) by 1 wicket
- Motorsport:
  - Indy Racing League: Dan Wheldon wins the 89th Indianapolis 500 at the Indianapolis Motor Speedway. Meanwhile, Danica Patrick records the highest finish amongst female drivers in the race's history and the year's field of rookie drivers, finishing fourth.
  - Formula One: Fernando Alonso wins the European Grand Prix after Kimi Räikkönen crashes on the last lap with a suspension failure. (Formula 1.com)
  - NASCAR: Jimmie Johnson wins a wild Coca-Cola 600 on a last lap pass of Bobby Labonte, becoming the first driver to win the 600 three straight years. The race is marred by 22 caution flags, which sets an all-time record in Nextel Cup.
- Cycling:
  - Paolo Savoldelli wins the 2005 Giro d'Italia. (BBC)
- Pakistani cricket tour of West Indies
  - West Indies complete a 4-day victory over Pakistan in their first of two Test matches, bowling them out for 296 to end with a 276-run victory.
- Ice hockey:
  - The London Knights defeat the Rimouski Océanic 4–0 to win the 2005 Memorial Cup.

== 28 May 2005 (Saturday) ==
- 2005 English cricket season:
  - Test match:
    - England (528 for 3 declared) beat Bangladesh (108 and 159) by an innings and 261 runs in the first Test of their two-Test series at Lord's. (BBC)
  - County Championship, Division One:
    - Surrey (10pts) drew with Kent (9pts)
    - Middlesex (12pts) drew with Sussex (10pts)
  - County Championship, Division Two:
    - Essex (12pts) drew with Yorkshire
- Boxing
  - Julio César Chávez Jr. beats Adam Wynant by a knockout only 42 seconds into round one, Jesus Gonzales outpoints Dumont Welliver over eight rounds, Jesús Chávez outpoints Carlos Hernandez over twelve rounds, and Julio César Chávez outpoints Ivan Robinson over ten rounds in an undercard nicknamed Adios Chávez (Goodbye Chávez)boxrec.com
- Rugby union:
  - In the Super 12 final at Jade Stadium in Christchurch, New Zealand, the homestanding Crusaders take a 35–6 lead in the second half and ease to a 35–25 win over the NSW Waratahs, earning their fifth title in the competition. This is the last Super 12 competition, as it will become the Super 14 in 2006 with the addition of two new teams. (BBC)

== 27 May 2005 (Friday) ==
- 2005 English cricket season:
  - County Championship, Division One:
    - Nottinghamshire (22pts) beat Gloucestershire (4.5pts) by an innings and 27 runs
    - Surrey are docked 8pts for ball-tampering in their earlier match against Nottinghamshire
  - County Championship, Division Two:
    - Somerset (21pts) beat Northamptonshire (8pts) by 6 wickets
  - National League, Division One:
    - Glamorgan (227 a/o) (4pts) beat Worcestershire (174 a/o) (0pts) by 53 runs
  - MCC University matches:
    - Durham UCCE drew with Durham
    - Lancashire beat Oxford UCCE by 10 wickets

== 26 May 2005 (Thursday) ==
- 2005 English cricket season:
  - County Championship, Division One:
    - Warwickshire (19pts) beat Hampshire (3pts) by 10 wickets

== 25 May 2005 (Wednesday) ==
- Football (soccer): UEFA Champions League Final, at Atatürk Olympic Stadium, Istanbul.
  - Liverpool defeat AC Milan 3–2 in a penalty kick shootout. AC Milan are 3–0 ahead after the first half, but Liverpool score 3 goals in the 54th, 56th and 60th minutes to tie the game. It's Liverpool's 5th European Cup title.
- American football:
  - The National Football League approves the purchase of the Minnesota Vikings for US$600 million. An investment group led by Zygi Wilf takes over the team from previous owner Red McCombs.

== 23 May 2005 (Monday) ==
- 2005 English cricket season:
  - County Championship, Division One:
    - Hampshire (22pts) beat Glamorgan (3pts) by 9 wickets
    - Kent (20pts) beat Nottinghamshire County Cricket Club in 2005 (3pts) by 196 runs
  - County Championship, Division Two:
    - Durham (10pts) drew with Yorkshire (9pts)
    - Lancashire (11pts) drew with Somerset (7pts)
    - Worcestershire (21pts) beat Essex (4pts) by 8 wickets
  - MCC University match:
    - Warwickshire beat Cambridge UCCE by 18 runs
- Rugby union:
  - In the sendoff game for the British & Irish Lions before they embark on their tour to New Zealand at Millennium Stadium in Cardiff, the lackluster Lions are nearly upset by an inspired second-choice Argentina side. Jonny Wilkinson, making his first international appearance since the 2003 Rugby World Cup, converts a penalty with the last kick of the match to salvage a 25–25 draw. (BBC)

== 22 May 2005 (Sunday) ==
- 2005 English cricket season:
  - Tour match:
    - Northamptonshire drew with the Bangladeshis
  - National League, Division One:
    - The match between Middlesex (95–5 in 21 overs) and Gloucestershire (40–2 in 7 overs) was abandoned as a draw (2pts each)
- Golf:
  - PGA Tour: Kenny Perry wins the Bank of America Colonial in Fort Worth by seven strokes over second place Billy Mayfair. Perry won this same event just two years ago.(Yahoo!)
  - LPGA: Paula Creamer, just 18, becomes the LPGA's second-youngest first-time winner ever, and the tour's youngest in 50 years, defeating second-place finishers Jeong Jang and Gloria Park by one shot to win the Sybase Classic in New Rochelle, New York. This Thursday, Creamer will graduate from high school.(Yahoo!)
- Motorsport:
  - Formula One: Kimi Räikkönen wins the Monaco Grand Prix for his second consecutive win, defeating WilliamsF1 drivers Nick Heidfeld, whom, with a second place, scores his best finish ever, and Mark Webber, who gets his very first podium. Räikkönen leads every lap once again, duplicating the feat he accomplished in Spain two weeks ago. (Formula1.com)
- Rugby union:
  - In an all-French Heineken Cup final at Murrayfield in Edinburgh, Toulouse defeat Stade Français (Paris) 18–12 in extra time. Toulouse is the first club to win the competition three times. (BBC)
- Cricket:
  - Pakistan complete their clean sweep of the West Indies, winning the third match of the ODI series by 22 runs to take the series by 3–0. Despite the win, they stay fifth in the ICC ODI Championship, tied on points with South Africa.

== 21 May 2005 (Saturday) ==
- Boxing:
  - Lamon Brewster retains his WBO world Heavyweight title with a first-round knockout of Andrzej Gołota.Boxrec.com
- Motorsport:
  - NASCAR: Mark Martin wins the 2005 NEXTEL All-Star Challenge. Brian Vickers wins the transfer race, the NEXTEL Open, in controversial fashion, spinning pole-sitter Mike Bliss coming to the start-finish line on the final lap, much to Bliss' dismay.(NASCAR.com)
  - Indianapolis 500: Kenny Bräck qualifies for the Indy 500, his first race since a life-threatening crash at Texas Motor Speedway in 2003. Bräck, replacing defending champion Buddy Rice (who, ironically, replaced Bräck in 2004), runs faster than pole-sitter Tony Kanaan but will start 23rd because he qualified after last Sunday's Pole Day. (AP/ESPN)
- Football (soccer):
  - For the first time in history, the FA Cup final goes to a penalty shootout. After Arsenal and Manchester United finish regular time and extra time tied 0–0, Arsenal wins the Cup by winning the shootout 5–4. Arsenal keeper Jens Lehmann saves United's second shot by Paul Scholes, and Gunners captain Patrick Vieira scores the winning shot. This will be the last final held at Millennium Stadium in Cardiff, Wales, as the 2006 final will be played at the new Wembley Stadium in London. (BBC)
- Thoroughbred Horse Racing:
  - The post-time favorite, Afleet Alex, defeats Kentucky Derby winner Giacomo (who finished third) in the Preakness Stakes held at Pimlico Race Course in Baltimore, Maryland, and therefore extends the United States Triple Crown drought to 27 years, the longest in racing history. (AP/ESPN)
- Ice hockey:
  - The London Knights defeat the Rimouski Océanic 4–3 in overtime, in the first game of the 2005 Memorial Cup.
- Cricket:
  - Pakistan (258/8) beat West Indies (218) by 40 runs at Gros Islet, St Lucia to take an unassailable 2–0 lead in the 3-ODI series.

== 20 May 2005 (Friday) ==
- Cricket:
  - Greg Chappell is appointed new coach of India. (Wisden Cricinfo)
- 2005 English cricket season:
  - National League Division Two:
    - Warwickshire (260/8) beat Derbyshire (208) by 52 runs (BBC)
    - Surrey (253/5) beat Scotland (252/7) by 5 wickets (BBC)
- Tennis: Citing an ankle injury, Serena Williams withdraws from the French Open, which begins on Monday. Joachim Johansson, citing an injury to his right elbow, also withdraws.

== 19 May 2005 (Thursday) ==
- Cricket: Ray Jennings is sacked as coach of South Africa after six months in charge and replaced by Mickey Arthur.

== 18 May 2005 (Wednesday) ==
- Cricket:
  - Pakistan (192) beat West Indies (133) by 59 runs in the 1st One Day International at St Vincent.
  - 2005 English cricket season: Cheltenham & Gloucester Trophy Round Two:
    - Sussex (197/6) beat Nottinghamshire (195/9) by 4 wickets (BBC)
- Football (soccer); UEFA Cup Final, at Estádio José Alvalade, Lisbon, Portugal.
  - Sporting 1 – 3 CSKA Moscow (UEFA.com)
    - This is the first time a Russian team has won a major European football club competition.

== 17 May 2005 (Tuesday) ==
- 2005 English cricket season:
  - Tour match:
    - Sussex beat Bangladesh by an innings and 226 runs
  - Cheltenham & Gloucester Trophy Round Two:
    - Kent (257/4) beat Derbyshire (130) by 127 runs (BBC)
    - Hampshire (219/4) beat Glamorgan (214) by 6 wickets (BBC)
    - Surrey (232/7) beat Gloucestershire (230/8) by 3 wickets (BBC)
    - Lancashire (196/4) beat Essex (195/9) by 6 wickets (BBC)
    - Northamptonshire (238) beat Middlesex (219) by 19 runs (BBC)
    - Warwickshire (235/9) beat Leicestershire (152) by 83 runs (BBC)
    - Yorkshire (241/9) beat Worcestershire (227/8) by 14 runs (BBC)
- Indianapolis 500:
  - After an accident last week left him unable to qualify this past weekend, defending Indy 500 champ Buddy Rice will not compete at this year's race. (Indianapolis500.com)

== 16 May 2005 (Monday) ==
- Golf:
  - PGA Tour: Jack Nicklaus announces his final tournament will be The Open Championship on The Old Course at St Andrews. (GolfWeb.com)
- A jeep driven by Portuguese midfielder José Bosingwa leaves the road and plunges down an embankment in northern Portugal. Bosingwa and his four passengers, all football players, were injured, one seriously Sandro Luis, who plays a third division club in the Azores Islands, underwent surgery and doctors indicated he may not play again. (Reuters South Africa)

== 15 May 2005 (Sunday) ==
- Indianapolis 500:
  - Defending IndyCar series champion Tony Kanaan wins the pole position for the 2005 race. Danica Patrick, 23 years old, earns the best start for a female driver by taking the fourth position. (Indianapolis500.com)
- Golf:
  - PGA Tour: Ted Purdy gets his first PGA Tour win at the EDS Byron Nelson Championship in Irving, Texas with a 15-under overall score, one shot better than overnight leader Sean O'Hair. (PGATOUR.com)
- Cricket:
  - South Africa (141/3) beat West Indies (138/7) by 7 wickets in the fifth and final One Day International at Trinidad, sealing a 5–0 series whitewash. (Wisden Cricinfo)
  - 2005 ICC Intercontinental Cup: Namibia (31.5pts) beat Uganda (17pts) by 3 wickets in Kampala. Uganda are eliminated, Namibia will play Kenya on 2–5 June to determine which African team progresses to the semi-finals.
  - 2005 English cricket season:
    - National League Division One:
      - Essex (217/5) beat Glamorgan (216/7) by 5 wickets (BBC)
      - Lancashire (218/3) beat Northamptonshire (215/7) by 7 wickets (BBC)
      - Hampshire (353/8) beat Middlesex (248) by 105 runs (BBC)
      - Worcestershire (190) beat Nottinghamshire (174) by 16 runs (BBC)
    - National League Division Two:
      - Durham (256/4) beat Yorkshire (205) by 51 runs (BBC)
      - Leicestershire (194–9) beat Surrey (134) by 60 runs (BBC)
- Ice hockey:
  - 2005 Men's World Ice Hockey Championships:
    - Czech Republic is the World Champion after beating Canada 3–0. Bronze medals goes to team Russia, which defeated team Sweden 6–3.
- Football (soccer):
  - Final-day drama in the FA Premier League:
    - West Bromwich Albion, which started the day at the bottom of the table, win 2–0 at home over Portsmouth. Losses by Norwich City and Southampton and a draw by Crystal Palace, combined with the West Brom win, relegate the other three teams and make West Brom the first team in Premier League history to survive relegation after being in last place at Christmas. (BBC)
    - In what amounted to a playoff for the final UEFA Cup place, Middlesbrough goalkeeper Mark Schwarzer saves a Robbie Fowler penalty in stoppage time to preserve a 1–1 draw at Manchester City. A successful Fowler conversion would have sent Man City to Europe at Boro's expense. (BBC)

== 14 May 2005 (Saturday) ==
- 2005 English cricket season:
  - County Championship, Division One:
    - Kent (10pts) drew with Hampshire (10pts)
    - Surrey (22pts) beat Glamorgan (6pts) by 276 runs
  - County Championship, Division Two:
    - Yorkshire (17pts) beat Leicestershire (5pts) by 6 wickets
    - Northamptsonshire (12pts) drew with Essex (6pts)
    - Worcestershire (22pts) beat Derbyshire (5pts) by 9 wickets
- Boxing: Winky Wright defeats Félix Trinidad by a twelve-round unanimous decision in a WBC Middleweight title eliminator. (Boxrec.com)
- NASCAR Nextel Cup: After finishing second one too many times (at least, if you ask him), Kasey Kahne records his first Nextel Cup Series win at the Chevy American Revolution 400 in Richmond, defeating Tony Stewart and Ryan Newman. (NASCAR.com)
- Golf: 22-year-old Sean O'Hair, who endured abuse from his father as an aspiring professional, leads at 12-under after three rounds of the PGA Tour's EDS Byron Nelson Championship. (PGATOUR.com leaderboard)
- Lacrosse: The Toronto Rock defeat the Arizona Sting 19–13 in the Air Canada Centre to win the Champion's Cup, the championship of the National Lacrosse League. (Sportsnet.ca)

== 13 May 2005 (Friday) ==
- 2005 English cricket season:
  - County Championship, Division One:
    - Middlesex (21pts) beat Gloucestershire (4pts) by 340 runs
  - County Championship, Division Two:
    - Durham (20pts) beat Lancashire (3pts) by 9 wickets
- Golf: Tiger Woods misses his first cut in 7 years on the PGA Tour. Before this, he had made the cut for a tour-record 142 consecutive tournaments. (ESPN.com)

== 12 May 2005 (Thursday) ==
- 2005 English cricket season:
  - Tour match:
    - The Bangladeshis drew with the British Universities
  - County Championship, Division One:
    - Sussex (21pts) beat Warwickshire (2pts) by an innings and 87 runs
- Football (soccer):
  - American businessman Malcolm Glazer, owner of the Tampa Bay Buccaneers of the NFL, wins control of UK football team Manchester United F.C. after securing a 70% share. (BBC) (ABC News) (NY Times)

== 11 May 2005 (Wednesday) ==
- 2005 English cricket season:
  - National League, Division Two:
    - Somerset (4pts) beat Scotland (0pts) by 16 runs
- Football (soccer):
  - Highly rated midfielder Mikel John Obi goes missing during a Norwegian cup match he was watching involving his team Lyn Oslo. The player had been dropped for the game following death threats he had received after he chose to sign for Manchester United ahead of Chelsea. The player, who was under armed guard, is believed to have left Norway accompanied by a football agent. BBC
  - Goalkeeper Ignacio González of the Chilean club team Espanola is arrested for punching referee Enrique Osses on the field during a match against the San Felipe team. Gonzalez faces a 50-game suspension. Evening Times Online
- Cricket:
  - South Africa beat West Indies by one run in the third One Day International at Bridgetown, Barbados. West Indies looked to be cruising to victory, needing four off the final over with three wickets in hand, but Charl Langeveldt came up with a hat-trick to win the match for South Africa. South Africa thus took an unassailable 3–0 lead in the 5-game series.

== 10 May 2005 (Tuesday) ==
- 2005 English cricket season:
  - MCC Universities:
    - Loughborough UCCE beat Worcestershire by 8 wickets
- Horse racing: Bellamy Road, the badly beaten favourite in the Kentucky Derby, will not race at the Preakness Stakes or the Belmont Stakes due to a leg injury.

== 9 May 2005 (Monday) ==
- 2005 ICC Intercontinental Cup:
  - Nepal (32pts) beat the United Arab Emirates (11pts) by 172 runs. However the UAE win the Asian group and progress to the semi-finals in Namibia after Nepal's game against Hong Kong was ravaged by rain.
- 2005 English cricket season:
  - County Championship, Division One:
    - Gloucestershire (22pts) beat Glamorgan by 7 wickets
    - Hampshire (19pts) beat Middlesex (5pts) by 64 runs
    - Nottinghamshire (22pts) beat Surrey (3pts) by an innings and 71 runs
  - County Championship, Division Two:
    - Durham (19pts) beat Somerset (5pts) by 4 wickets
    - Essex (21pts) beat Leicestershire (3.5pts) by 6 wickets
    - Lancashire (22pts) beat Derbyshire (3pts) by an innings and 72 runs
    - Yorkshire (20pts) beat Northamptonshire (5pts) by 10 wickets

== 8 May 2005 (Sunday) ==
- 2005 English cricket season:
  - National League, Division Two:
    - Kent (4pts) beat Scotland (0pts) by 93 runs (D/L method)
    - Sussex (4pts) beat Warwickshire (0pts) by 44 runs (D/L method)
- Basketball:
  - Euroleague Final Four in Moscow:
    - Maccabi Tel Aviv successfully defends its title with a 90–78 win over TAU Cerámica. (Euroleague.net)
    - In the third-place game, Panathinaikos erases a 22-point deficit in the third quarter and defeats Final Four hosts CSKA Moscow 94–91 in double overtime. (Euroleague.net)
  - NBA: The Phoenix Suns' Steve Nash is named the NBA's most valuable player, becoming the first Canadian to win the award. In 1996, Nash was drafted 15th overall by the Suns, making him the lowest-drafted player ever to be named MVP.
- Formula One: Kimi Räikkönen wins the Spanish Grand Prix, leading every lap in the process. (Formula1.com)

== 7 May 2005 (Saturday) ==
- Horse racing: Giacomo, a 50–1 longshot with Mike E. Smith up, beats a field of 20 horses to win the 131st Kentucky Derby at Churchill Downs in Louisville, Kentucky. (AP/Louisville Courier-Journal)
- Cricket: A player from Warwickshire County Cricket Club, the defending County Champions, has tested positive for a recreational drug. He is the second Warwickshire player who has tested positive in seven months. (Cricinfo)
- Snooker: Ronnie O'Sullivan beats Mark Williams 6–0 to win the Premier League
- Auto racing:
  - NASCAR: Greg Biffle wins the Dodge Charger 500 at Darlington Raceway from Jeff Gordon and Kasey Kahne. (NASCAR.com)

== 6 May 2005 (Friday) ==
- Basketball:
  - Euroleague semifinals in Moscow:
    - Maccabi Tel Aviv 91, Panathinaikos 82 (Euroleague.net)
    - TAU Cerámica 85, CSKA Moscow 78 (Euroleague.net)
  - NBA:
    - The Phoenix Suns' Steve Nash is expected to be named the league's MVP on Sunday. (Yahoo!)
    - NBA playoffs: The Washington Wizards defeat the Chicago Bulls 94–91 to win their opening-round series 4–2. It's the Wizards' first playoff series win since 1982. (Ohio News Network)

== 5 May 2005 (Thursday) ==
- 2005 English cricket season:
  - C&G Trophy, Round One:
    - Derbyshire beat Durham by 1 wicket
    - Worcestershire beat Scotland by 10 wickets
- Football (soccer):
  - The English Football Association confirms that the top four finishers in this season's FA Premier League will qualify for next season's Champions League even if Liverpool F.C. win the CL and finish below fourth in the Premiership. The FA says it will continue to lobby UEFA for Liverpool to receive a place in the CL should it win the competition and finish below fourth place in the league. (BBC)
  - UEFA Cup Semi-finals, 2nd leg (teams progressing to the final in Lisbon in **bold**).
    - **CSKA Moscow** 3 – 0 Parma (UEFA.com)
    - AZ Alkmaar 3 – 2 **Sporting** (after extra time) (UEFA.com)
- Formula One: The FIA bans BAR for the next two races for running what is alleged to have been an illegal car at the San Marino Grand Prix. (Formula1.com)

== 4 May 2005 (Wednesday) ==
- 2005 English cricket season:
  - C&G Trophy, Round One:
    - Essex beat Devon by 180 runs
    - Glamorgan beat Suffolk by 143 runs
    - Gloucestershire beat Berkshire by 85 runs
    - Hampshire beat Shropshire by 7 wickets
    - Lancashire beat Buckinghamshire by 51 runs (D/L method)
    - Leicestershire beat Somerset by 3 wickets
    - Middlesex beat Northumberland by 10 wickets
    - Nottinghamshire beat Wales Minor Counties by 6 wickets
    - Surrey beat Staffordshire by 3 wickets
    - Sussex beat Bedfordshire by 8 wickets
    - Warwickshire beat Holland by 23 runs
    - Yorkshire beat Ireland by 6 wickets
- Football (soccer): UEFA Champions League Semi-final, 2nd leg (team progressing to the final in Istanbul in **bold**).
  - PSV Eindhoven 3 – 1 **AC Milan** (UEFA.com)

== 3 May 2005 (Tuesday) ==
- 2005 English cricket season:
  - C&G Trophy, Round One:
    - Nottinghamshire beat Denmark by 8 wickets
    - Kent beat Wiltshire by 9 runs
- Football (soccer): UEFA Champions League Semi-final, 2nd leg (team progressing to the final in Istanbul in **bold**).
  - **Liverpool** 1 – 0 Chelsea (UEFA.com)

== 2 May 2005 (Monday) ==
- Snooker: Qualifier Shaun Murphy beats Matthew Stevens 18–16 to win the World Snooker Championship in Sheffield, England (BBC)
- 2005 ICC Intercontinental Cup:
  - Nepal (8.5pts) drew with Hong Kong (5pts) in Kathmandu
- 2005 English cricket season:
  - National League Division One in 2005:
    - Gloucestershire (4pts) and Hampshire (0pts) by 60 runs
    - Glamorgan (4pts) and Nottinghamshire (0pts) by 4 runs (D/L method)
  - National League Division Two in 2005:
    - The match between Durham (2pts) and Sussex (2pts) was abandoned as a No Result after rain
    - Somerset (4pts) beat Surrey (0pts) by 99 runs (D/L method)

== 1 May 2005 (Sunday) ==
- 2005 English cricket season:
  - National League Division One in 2005:
    - Middlesex (4pts) beat Worcestershire (0pts) by 3 wickets (D/L method)
    - Lancashire (4pts) beat Nottinghamshire (0pts) by 1 run (D/L method)
    - Northamptonshire (4pts) beat Hampshire (0pts) by 98 runs
  - National League Division Two in 2005:
    - Somerset (4pts) beat Leicestershire (0pts) by 8 wickets
    - Warwickshire (4pts) beat Kent (0pts) by 19 runs
    - Yorkshire (4pts) beat Sussex (0pts) by 3 wickets
    - The match between Scotland (2pts) and Durham (2pts) was abandoned as a No Result
- NASCAR Nextel Cup: Jeff Gordon, driving with a Star Wars Episode III paint scheme, wins the Aaron's 499 at Talladega Superspeedway for the second consecutive year. The race features a 25-car accident that forces NASCAR to red flag the event for nearly 45 minutes. (NASCAR.com)
