= April 2005 in sports =

<<	April 2005					>>
Su	Mo	Tu	We	Th	Fr	Sa
					1	2
3	4	5	6	7	8	9
10	11	12	13	14	15	16
17	18	19	20	21	22	23
24	25	26	27	28	29	30
India; Sports

This list shows notable sports-related deaths, events, and notable outcomes that occurred in April of 2005.

== Deaths ==
- 28 – Red Horner
- 23 – Earl Wilson
- 18 – Clarence Gaines
- 18 – Sam Mills
- 15 – Jimmy Allan
- 15 – Art Cross
- 15 – Duilio Spagnolo
- 13 – Don Blasingame
- 12 – Bill Jones
- 11 – Lucien Laurent
- 10 – Al Lucas
- 9 – Scott Mason
- 7 – Cliff Allison
- 3 – Frank Clair

== Ongoing events ==
- 2005 English cricket season
- 2005 ICC Intercontinental Cup
- 2005 in NASCAR
- 31 Mar-15 May: Cricket: S Africa tour W Indies
- 16 April–2 May: Snooker: World Championship

== 30 April 2005 (Saturday) ==
- Boxing: Iván Calderón retains his WBO world Minimumweight title with an eighth-round knockout of Noel Tunacao, Nelson Dieppa loses his WBO world Light Flyweight title with a ten-round technical decision against Hugo Cazares in San Juan, Puerto Rico; John Ruiz loses his WBA world Heavyweight title to James Toney by a twelve-round unanimous decision at New York, New York and announces his retirement from boxing, and Christy Martin posts a second-round knockout win over Lana Alexander in Lula, Mississippi.Boxrec.com
- Bundesliga: Kaiserslautern 0–4 Bayern Munich
  - "Bayern win their 19th Bundesliga title and their third in the last five years". Eurosport. Archived from the original on May 7, 2005.
- Premier League: Bolton 0–2 Chelsea
  - "Chelsea win their first Premier League Championship in 50 years". Eurosport. Archived from the original on April 29, 2005.
- 2005 English cricket season:
  - County Championship – Division One:
    - Gloucestershire (8pts) drew with Kent (11pts)
    - Nottinghamshire (22pts) beat Sussex (6pts) by 10 wickets
    - Surrey (18pts) beat Glamorgan (5pts) by 5 wickets
    - Warwickshire (22pts) beat Middlesex (5pts) by 7 wickets
  - County Championship – Division Two:
    - Essex (22pts) beat Somerset (2pts) by 9 wickets
    - Lancashire (17pts) beat Worcestershire (6pts) by 76 runs
    - Northamptonshire (12pts) drew with Derbyshire (7pts)

== 29 April 2005 (Friday) ==
- 2005 English cricket season:
  - MCC University matches in 2005:
    - Gloucestershire beat Cardiff UCCE by 95 runs
    - Leicestershire drew with Durham UCCE

== 28 April 2005 (Thursday) ==
- Former Toronto Maple Leafs player Red Horner, the oldest living member of the Hockey Hall of Fame and the oldest former NHLer, passes away at age 95. TSN
- Football: UEFA Cup semi-finals, first leg:
  - Parma 0 – 0 CSKA Moscow (UEFA.com)
  - Sporting 2 – 1 AZ Alkmaar (UEFA.com)

== 27 April 2005 (Wednesday) ==
- Football (soccer): UEFA Champions League, semi-final, first leg:
  - Chelsea 0 – 0 Liverpool (UEFA.com)

== 26 April 2005 (Tuesday) ==
- ICC Intercontinental Cup:
  - United Arab Emirates (30pts) beat Hong Kong (12.5pts) in Sharjah
- Football (soccer): UEFA Champions League, semi-final, first leg:
  - AC Milan 2 – 0 PSV Eindhoven (UEFA.com)

== 25 April 2005 (Monday) ==
- Football (soccer): The Football Association asks UEFA to grant Liverpool a place in next season's Champions League should they win the competition this year but finish below fourth place in the FA Premier League. UEFA have indicated that they will not allow five teams from one country to take part. The FA could still place Liverpool in the Champions League if they win it – but they would have to deny the fourth placed Premiership club (currently Liverpool's intracity rivals Everton) in order to do so. (sportinglife.com)

== 24 April 2005 (Sunday) ==
- 2005 ICC Intercontinental Cup:
  - Kenya (32pts) beat Uganda (15pts) by 168 runs in Kampala
- 2005 English cricket season:
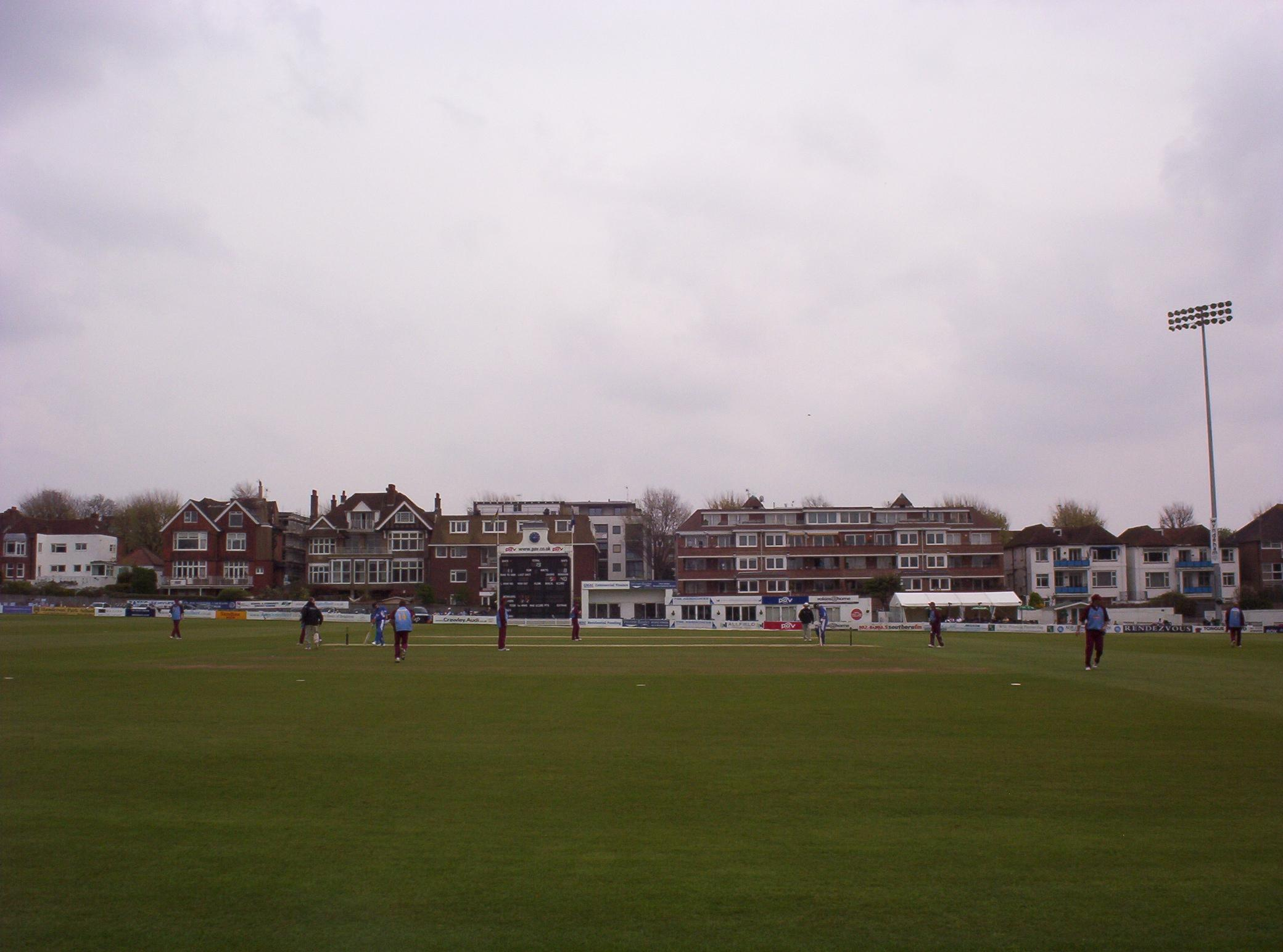
  Derbyshire batting against Sussex at Hove
  - National League Division One in 2005:
    - Gloucestershire (4pts) beat Northamptonshire (0pts) by 9 runs
    - Middlesex (4pts) beat Lancashire (0pts) by 69 runs
  - National League Division Two in 2005:
    - Durham (4pts) beat Surrey (0pts) by 138 runs
    - Kent (4pts) beat Leicestershire (0pts) by 6 runs (D/L method)
    - Sussex (4pts) beat Derbyshire (0pts) by 2 runs (D/L method)
    - Yorkshire (4pts) beat Somerset (0pts) by 5 wickets
- Basketball: Defending champions Guangdong Southern Tigers defeat Jiangsu Dragons in the fifth and final match of the best-of-five Chinese Basketball Association finals, winning the finals 3 games to 2. Guangdong had a 42-point fourth quarter, overcoming a 14-point deficit in the early minutes of that quarter to win the final match by eight points, 107–99.
- Rugby union, Heineken Cup semifinal: Leicester Tigers 19, Toulouse 27 at Walkers Stadium, Leicester. Toulouse will face fellow French side Stade Français in the final on 22 May at Murrayfield, Edinburgh. (BBC)
- Formula One: Fernando Alonso wins a dramatic San Marino Grand Prix, beating Michael Schumacher by just 0.215 seconds. It is the closest finish in Formula One (not involving teammates) since 1992. (Formula1.com)

== 23 April 2005 (Saturday) ==
- Boxing:
  - Antonio Margarito retains his WBO world Welterweight title, with a fifth-round knockout win over Kermit Cintron. In the undercard, Shane Mosley returns to boxing with a ten-round decision win over David Castillo. ESPN.com
  - Wladimir Klitschko returns to the ring, with a fourth-round knockout over Eliseo Castillo. Boxing Central.com
- 2005 English cricket season:
  - County Championship – Division One:
    - Middlesex (9pts) drew with Nottinghamshire (12pts)
    - Kent (10pts) drew with Warwickshire (10pts)
    - Sussex (9pts) drew with Hampshire (9pts)
  - County Championship – Division Two:
    - Northamptonshire (12pts) drew with Leicestershire (9pts)
    - Yorkshire (22pts) beat Somerset (3pts) by an innings and 44 runs
- Rugby union, Heineken Cup semifinal: Stade Français 20, Biarritz 17 at Stade de France, Saint-Denis, metro Paris. Stade advances to the final to be held 22 May at Murrayfield, Edinburgh. (BBC)
- NFL: The 2005 NFL draft begins at the Jacob Javits Convention Center in New York City. Highlights (ESPN):
  - The San Francisco 49ers, selecting first overall, pick Utah quarterback Alex Smith, as expected.
  - For the first time ever, three running backs are among the first five selections: Auburn teammates Ronnie Brown and Carnell Williams (second and fifth respectively) and Texas' Cedric Benson (fourth).
  - Auburn has four first-round picks, with Brown and Williams joined by cornerback Carlos Rogers (ninth) and QB Jason Campbell (25).
  - Cal QB Aaron Rodgers, who was regarded by many as a possible top overall pick until a week before the draft, freefalls through the first round all the way to the 24th slot. The Green Bay Packers pick Rodgers, who now stands to be the eventual successor to Brett Favre.
  - In a surprise move, the Denver Broncos draft Maurice Clarett, former Ohio State running back, as a third-round compensatory pick.
- Nextel Cup: In the series' first night race at Phoenix International Raceway, Kurt Busch leads over half of the laps en route to his first victory of the season at the Subway Fresh 500. (NASCAR.com)
- Major League Soccer: The Los Angeles Galaxy defeats C.D. Chivas USA 3–1 in an inter-city match. A strange delay occurs in the 41st minute when the "SkyCam", a movable TV camera suspended above the ground on a cable, that ESPN2 is using crashes to the ground, sparking a 3 1/2-minute stoppage. The camera is removed at halftime. No one is injured when it falls.(MLSNet MatchTracker)

== 22 April 2005 (Friday) ==
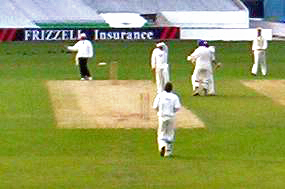
Bradford/Leeds UCCE celebrate as the winning runs are struck.

- 2005 English cricket season:
  - National League, Division One
    - The match between Glamorgan and Essex was abandoned without a ball being played (2pts each)
  - MCC Universities:
    - Derbyshire drew with Oxford UCCE
    - Bradford/Leeds UCCE beat Surrey by 4 wickets

== 21 April 2005 (Thursday) ==
- 2005 English cricket season:
  - County Championship – Division Two:
    - Durham (19pts) beat Worcestershire (3pts) by 7 wickets

== 18 April 2005 (Monday) ==
- Cycling:
  - Six times winner of the Tour de France, Lance Armstrong, announces that he will retire from competition after this summer's Tour. (BBC)
  - Olympic champion Tyler Hamilton is banned for two years for blood doping, the U.S. Anti-Doping Agency reports. Hamilton forfeits all competitive results since the Tour of Spain where he tested positive last 11 September. (BBC)
- Athletics – Boston Marathon:
  - Men's race – Hailu Negussie, Ethiopia, 2 hours, 11 minutes, 45 seconds. (AP/ESPN)
  - Women's race – Catherine Ndereba, Kenya, 2 hours, 25 minutes, 13 seconds. (AP/ESPN)

== 17 April 2005 (Sunday) ==
- Athletics – London Marathon:
  - Men's race – Martin Lel, Kenya, 2 hours, 7 minutes, 26 seconds. (BBC)
  - Women's race – Paula Radcliffe, Britain, 2 hours, 17 minutes, 42 seconds. (BBC)
- 2005 English cricket season:
  - National League, Division One:
    - Essex (4pts) beat Hampshire (0pts) by 16 runs (D/L)
    - The match between Lancashire and Glamorgan was abandoned (2pts each)
    - Worcestershire (4pts) beat Northamptonshire (0pts) by 31 runs (D/L)
    - Middlesex (4pts) beat Nottinghamshire (0pts) by 35 runs (D/L)
  - National League, Division Two:
    - The match between Derbyshire and Kent was abandoned (2pts each)
    - Durham (4pts) beat Leicestershire (0pts) by 9 runs (D/L)
    - Yorkshire (4pts) beat Surrey (0pts) by 43 runs in the only game unaffected by rain
    - The match between Warwickshire and Somerset was abandoned (2pts each) (BBC)
- Football (soccer):
  - FA Cup semi-final: Newcastle United 1 – 4 Manchester United. Manchester United reach their seventeenth FA Cup Final. (BBC)
  - The Oceania Football Confederation has given its permission for Australia to leave that confederation and join the Asian Football Confederation. The AFC has already endorsed Australia's move. FIFA must approve the move, and will make its decision later in 2005. The proposed move will not take effect until after the 2006 World Cup. (Reuters/Yahoo!)
- Nextel Cup: After starting in the back of the field after wrecking his primary car in a practice session, Greg Biffle comes back to wins the Samsung/Radio Shack 500 at Texas Motor Speedway. (NASCAR.com)
- Golf: Australian Peter Lonard gets his very first PGA Tour win in a very strange final round of the MCI Heritage in Hilton Head Island, South Carolina. 54-hole leader Darren Clarke is at 14-under at one point in the final round, but ends up at 5-under in a 4-way tie for second place, a tie that includes 5-time tournament winner Davis Love III. Lonard finishes at 7-under.(The Golf Channel)

== 16 April 2005 (Saturday) ==
- 2005 English cricket season:
  - County Championship, Division One:
    - Hampshire (17pts) beat Gloucestershire (4pts) by 48 runs
    - Surrey (12pts) drew with Sussex (9pts)
    - Warwickshire (22pts) beat Glamorgan (1pt) by an innings and 43 runs
  - County Championship, Division Two:
    - Worcestershire (21pts) beat Derbyshire (3pts) by 10 wickets
    - Essex (12pts) drew with Yorkshire (5.5pts)
    - Lancashire (10pts) drew with Somerset (9pts)
- Football (soccer): FA Cup semi-final: Arsenal 3 – 0 Blackburn Rovers. Arsenal reach their fourth FA Cup Final in five years. (BBC)

== 15 April 2005 (Friday) ==
- 2005 English cricket season:
  - County Championship, Division Two:
    - Durham (22pts) beat Leicestershire (1pt) by an innings and 216 runs.
  - Universities:
    - Kent drew with Cardiff UCCE
    - Nottinghamshire drew with Loughborough UCCE
- Football (soccer): UEFA hands down its punishment to Internazionale for the unruly behaviour of their fans during their Champions League match against AC Milan. AC has been awarded a 3–0 victory in the match and will advance to the semifinals to face PSV Eindhoven. In addition, Inter must play their next four UEFA home matches in an empty stadium, with the possibility of two more empty stadium matches if fans cause more trouble during a three-year probation period. (Reuters/Yahoo!)
- Auto racing: Just 5 days after opening his Champ Car title defense by winning at Long Beach, Sébastien Bourdais beats NASCAR driver Mark Martin to win the second round of the International Race of Champions season at Texas Motor Speedway.(AP via Yahoo!)

== 14 April 2005 (Thursday) ==
- Baseball:
  - In the first Major League Baseball contest held in Washington, D.C. since 1971, the hometown Nationals defeated the Arizona Diamondbacks, 5–3. (CBS Sportsline)
  - During the 8th inning of a Yankees/Red Sox game, a fan hits right fielder Gary Sheffield in the face while in foul territory. Security guards quickly intervene to prevent a major skirmish. In the game itself, the Red Sox win 8–5. (ESPN.com)
- Cricket: New Zealand (522/9 declared) beat Sri Lanka (211 and 273) by an innings and 38 runs in the second Test at Wellington, winning the two-match series 1–0. (Wisden Cricinfo)
- Football: UEFA Cup, Quarter-finals, second leg, progressing teams in bold:
  - **Sporting** 4 – 1 Newcastle United (UEFA.com)
  - **AZ Alkmaar** 1 – 1 Villarreal (UEFA.com)
  - AJ Auxerre 2 – 0 **CSKA Moskva** (UEFA.com)
  - **Parma** 0 – 0 Austria Vienna (UEFA.com)

== 13 April 2005 (Wednesday) ==
- Football: UEFA Champions League, Quarter-finals, second leg, progressing teams in bold:
  - Juventus 0 – 0 **Liverpool** (UEFA.com)
  - **PSV Eindhoven** 1 – 1 Lyon (PSV win 4–2 on penalties) (UEFA.com)

== 12 April 2005 (Tuesday) ==
- Cricket: Pakistan (319/7) beat India (315/6) by 3 wickets in the 4th One Day International at Ahmedabad. (Wisden Cricinfo)
- Football: UEFA Champions League, Quarter-finals, second leg, progressing teams in bold:
  - Bayern Munich 3 – 2 **Chelsea** (UEFA.com)
  - Inter Milan – **AC Milan** – match abandoned after 75 minutes because of fan unrest, when AC Milan were leading 1–0 (3–0 on aggregate). Result is pending decision of the UEFA Control and Disciplinary Body, which may either let the result stand, or award the match 3–0 to AC Milan. Regardless of UEFA's final decision, AC Milan advance. (UEFA.com)

== 11 April 2005 (Monday) ==
- Rugby union: The British & Irish Lions squad for their upcoming tour to New Zealand has been named. As expected, Ireland star Brian O'Driscoll will be captain. Other highlights: (BBC)
  - England has the largest contingent, with 20 players; 14 of them played on the 2003 World Cup champions. Six Nations winner Wales has 10 players, Ireland has 11, and Scotland has three.
  - England icon Jonny Wilkinson has been left off the team due to his current injuries, but may be added if his health and form allow.
  - England's veteran back row of Lawrence Dallaglio, Neil Back and Richard Hill received their third Lions callups. Both Dallaglio and Back were called back from international retirement, and the 36-year-old Back becomes the oldest Lion ever.
- Cricket: The first round of games in the **2005 English cricket season** ends, with the most notable result being the MCC's victory over the Champion County, Warwickshire by 7 wickets at Lord's in what was effectively a Test trial. (Cricinfo)
  - MCC University matches:
    - Essex beat Cambridge UCCE by 4 wickets
    - Glamorgan drew with Cardiff UCCE
    - Oxford UCCE drew with Gloucestershire
    - Northamptonshire beat Bradford/Leeds UCCE by an innings and 62 runs
    - Somerset drew with Durham UCCE
    - Sussex drew with Loughborough UCCE

== 10 April 2005 (Sunday) ==
- Golf: Tiger Woods defeats Chris DiMarco on the first hole of a sudden-death playoff, after both golfers finished at 276 (−12) after 72 holes, to win the 2005 Masters Tournament in Augusta, Georgia. It is the 4th "green jacket" for Woods and his ninth major championship before his 30th birthday. Woods also reclaims the top spot in the World Golf Rankings. (AP/Yahoo!) (CBS Sportsline)
- Arena football: Al Lucas, former NFL and current Arena Football League player, dies from an apparent spinal cord injury sustained while trying to make a tackle for the Los Angeles Avengers in a game against the New York Dragons. (FOXSports.com)
- Nextel Cup: Jeff Gordon wins the Advance Auto Parts 500 in Martinsville, Virginia, after coming back from being 3 laps down early in the race. (NASCAR.com)
- Champ Car: Sébastien Bourdais begins his Champ Car title defense the right way, beating Paul Tracy to win the Toyota Grand Prix of Long Beach.

== 9 April 2005 (Saturday) ==
- Cricket: Pakistan (319/9) beat India (213) by 106 runs in the 3rd One Day International at Jamshedpur. (Wisden CricInfo)
- Horse-racing:
  - Hedgehunter (7–1 favourite), ridden by Ruby Walsh, wins the Grand National at Aintree Racecourse. (BBC)
  - Buzzard's Bay, a 30–1 longshot, wins the Santa Anita Derby by a half-length over General John B. Sweet Catomine, a hopeful for the Kentucky Derby, finished fifth. (Sports Network/Yahoo!)
  - Bellamy Road wins the Wood Memorial by 17 1/2 lengths, establishing himself as a favorite in the Kentucky Derby. The colt is owned by New York Yankees owner George Steinbrenner and trained by Nick Zito. (AP/Yahoo!)
- Ice hockey – Women's World Championship: The United States defeat Canada 3–1 in a penalty shootout to win the women's world hockey championship. It is Canada's first loss to the US in the history of the championships. The loss brings to an end their streak of eight consecutive championships. A ninth consecutive championship would have tied the Soviet men's team for most consecutive championships in ice hockey. (AP/Yahoo!)

== 8 April 2005 (Friday) ==
- Cricket:
  - The 2005 English cricket season officially starts, as the champion county, Warwickshire take on the Marylebone Cricket Club at Lord's. (Wisden Cricinfo)
  - The first Test cricket match between New Zealand (561 and 238) and Sri Lanka (498 and 7/0) at Napier ends in a draw after bad light stops play on the fifth day. (BBC)

== 7 April 2005 (Thursday) ==
- Football: UEFA Cup, Quarter-finals, first leg:
  - Newcastle United 1 – 0 Sporting Lisbon (UEFA.com)
  - CSKA 4 – 0 Auxerre (UEFA.com)
  - Austria Vienna 1 – 1 Parma (UEFA.com)
  - Villarreal 1 – 2 AZ Alkmaar (UEFA.com)

== 6 April 2005 (Wednesday) ==
- Football: UEFA Champions League, Quarter-finals, first leg:
  - Chelsea 4 – 2 Bayern Munich (UEFA.com)
  - AC Milan 2 – 0 Inter Milan (UEFA.com)

== 5 April 2005 (Tuesday) ==
- Cricket: India (356/9) beat Pakistan (298) by 58 runs in the second One Day International at Visakhapatnam. (Wisden Cricinfo)
- Football: UEFA Champions League, quarterfinals, first leg:
  - Liverpool 2 – 1 Juventus (UEFA.com)
  - Lyon 1 – 1 PSV (UEFA.com)

== 4 April 2005 (Monday) ==
- Golf: PGA Tour: Phil Mickelson wins the BellSouth Classic at Sugarloaf after a five-man, four-hole play-off. (BBC)
- Cricket: South Africa (188 and 269/4) draw with West Indies (543/5 dec.) in the first Test at Guyana. (Wisden Cricinfo)
- Basketball – NCAA tournament, championship game:
  - The North Carolina Tar Heels defeat the Illinois Fighting Illini 75–70 to win the NCAA national basketball championship. It is the school's fifth championship and the first championship for head coach Roy Williams. Carolina's Sean May is named the tournament's Most Outstanding Player. (AP/ESPN)

== 3 April 2005 (Sunday) ==
- Formula One: The Bahrain Grand Prix is won by Renault's Fernando Alonso
- NASCAR Nextel Cup: Kevin Harvick takes the checkered flag in the Food City 500 at Bristol Motor Speedway. (NASCAR.com)
- Cycling: Tom Boonen wins the Tour of Flanders. He finished 35 seconds ahead of Andreas Klier. Peter van Petegem finished 3rd.
- Rugby union: Heineken Cup quarterfinals
  - Biarritz 19–10 Munster (at San Sebastián, Spain) (BBC)

== 2 April 2005 (Saturday) ==
- All sporting events in Italy are suspended following the death of Pope John Paul II. (AP/ESPN)
- Football (soccer): Newcastle United teammates Lee Bowyer and Kieron Dyer are sent off for fighting each other. The altercation occurred in the 82nd minute of a 3–0 Premiership loss to Aston Villa at St James' Park. (BBC)
- Cricket: India (281 for 8) beat Pakistan (194) by 87 runs in the first One Day International at Kochi.
- Rugby union: Heineken Cup quarterfinals
  - Stade Français 48–8 Newcastle Falcons (BBC)
  - Leinster 13–29 Leicester Tigers (BBC)
- Basketball – NCAA tournament, Final Four (advancing teams in **bold**):
  - **Illinois** 72, Louisville 57 (AP/ESPN)
  - **North Carolina** 87, Michigan State 71 (AP/ESPN)

== 1 April 2005 (Friday) ==
- Football (soccer): As an April Fool's joke, Bayern Munich announces on its website that it is set to sign Real Madrid and England superstar and cultural icon David Beckham. A Bayern spokesman freely admitted to the hoax. (FCBayern.de, in German) (FCBayern.de, in English) (Reuters/Yahoo!)
- Rugby union: Heineken Cup quarterfinals
  - Toulouse 37–9 Northampton Saints (BBC)
