= MCC University matches in 2005 =

The MCC University matches in 2005 are games played between the University Centre of Cricketing Excellence ("UCCEs") and first-class opposition. This is the first year the games are called "MCC" University matches, after the MCC announced a funding plan to support the development of student cricket.

There are six UCCEs, four of which have first-class status: Oxford UCCE, Cambridge UCCE, Durham UCCE and Loughborough UCCE. These are joined by two non-first-class university teams: Cardiff/Glamorgan UCCE and Leeds/Bradford UCCE.

== The first round of games ==
=== Cambridge UCCE v Essex (9–11 April) ===
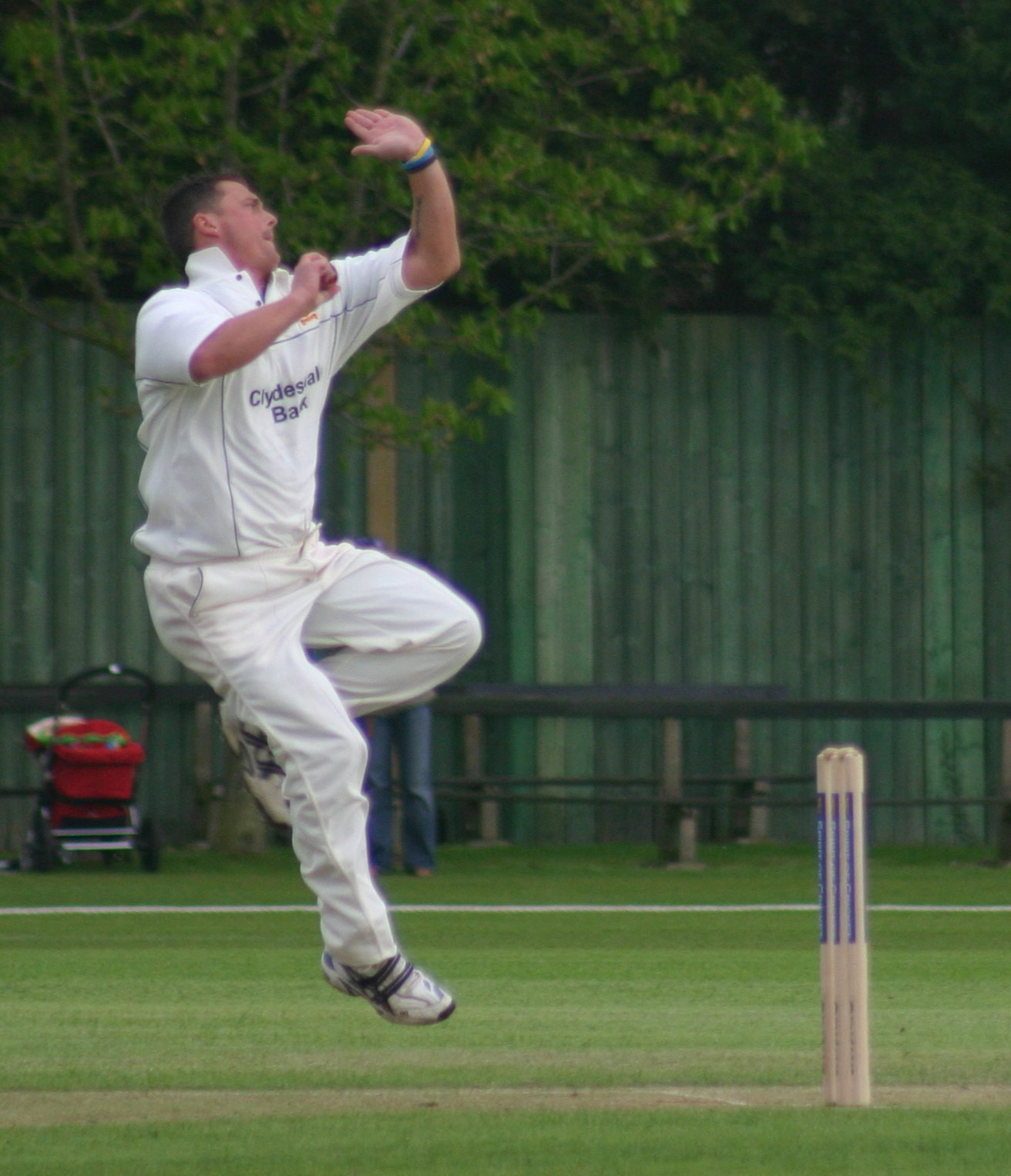
Darren Gough bowling for Essex against Cambridge UCCE

Essex beat Cambridge UCCE by 4 wickets

Cambridge UCCE and Essex started the season at Fenner's Ground in Cambridge. For the first time the Cambridge UCCE team was dominated by players from Anglia Polytechnic University rather than Cambridge University. The first day was a successful one for Cambridge UCCE, who completed an innings of 321. This was quite a recovery from 7 down for 139, when Friedlander (81), who has represented Boland in South Africa, and Wright (76) got together. James Middlebrook took 5 for 54 for Essex. On the second day, Essex put together 307 for 4 declared, although no player scored more than Ravinder Bopara, with 69. Cambridge UCCE scored 64 for 3 by close of play. On the third and final day, Cambridge UCCE piled on more runs, finally declaring on 255 for 4, the highlight of which being 129 not out from Adnan Akram.

This left Essex 270 to win. They lost wickets in doing so, with Palladino taking four wickets, and the students gamely going for a win. However, an all-round performance by Essex finally saw them home with four wickets left. (Cricinfo scorecard)

=== Glamorgan v Cardiff UCCE (9–11 April) ===
Match drawn

On the first day of this match at Sophia Gardens, Cardiff, Glamorgan ran riot, notching up 516 for 7, with David Hemp (120), Matthew Maynard (105) and Ian Thomas (133) all making centuries. They continued on the second day, adding 87 for the last three wickets, until Cardiff UCCE finally dismissed them. The match didn't improve for Cardiff UCCE, as they made only 152 in reply. However, Glamorgan chose not to enforce the follow-on and elected for more batting practice. By close of play they were 134 for no loss. On the third and final day, Mark Wallace and Jonathan Hughes both completed their centuries, making 117 and 109 (retired hurt) respectively. Glamorgan finally declared on 381 for 3, leaving Cardiff UCCE an impossible 833 to win. At 57 for 2, an early capitulation looked likely. However, Rhodri Lloyd and Simon Butler got together and proved difficult to dismiss. By the time Lloyd was out for 102, Butler was on 104, Cardiff UCCE 257 for 3, and the game ended in a draw. (Cricinfo scorecard)

=== Oxford UCCE v Gloucestershire (9–11 April) ===
Match drawn

Oxford Universities Cricketing Centre of Excellence and Gloucestershire started their 2005 first-class season at the Parks in Oxford on 9 April. Gloucestershire won the toss and chose to bat. They made 305 for 9 declared off 89.2 overs, Phil Weston's 103 making him the first Gloucestershire centurion of the season. The declaration left 9 overs for Oxford to bat through until the end of the first day. They were 21 for 2 at the close.

On the second day, Oxford UCCE collapsed to 116 all out. Gloucestershire chose batting practice rather than to enforce the follow-on. At close they were 262 for 1, with Craig Spearman undefeated on 170. In the final over, which was the first one Stephen Moreton had bowled in first-class cricket, Spearman scored 6,6,6,6,4 and 6, with Spearman being dropped twice. The innings continued on the third and last day, and Gloucestershire closed on 490 for 4 declared from 101 overs. Spearman had made 216 before he retired out. There were few overs in the day left, but victory for Gloucestershire looked on the cards when they reduced Oxford UCCE to 24 for 6. Then a rearguard undefeated 64 from Knappett and 22 from Woods rescued some pride for Oxford UCCE and saw them through for the draw. (Cricinfo scorecard)

=== Northamptonshire v Bradford/Leeds UCCE (9–10 April) ===
Northamptonshire beat Bradford/Leeds UCCE by an innings and 62 runs

The first day of this game at Northampton saw Northamptonshire progress to 373 for 7 declared off only 69 overs. Kevin Innes top-scored with 80 off only 59 balls. The declaration left time for 23 more overs on the first day, in which Bradford/Leeds UCCE slumped to 60 for 5. The second day, Bradford/Leeds UCCE fared equally badly, being dismissed for 137. Northamptonshire chose to enforce the follow-on rather than opt for batting practice, and saw off Bradford/Leeds UCCE for 174 to win by an innings and 62 runs in two days. Spinners Monty Panesar and Jason Brown both got five wickets each in the match. (Cricinfo scorecard)

=== Somerset v Durham UCCE (9–11 April) ===
Match drawn

At Taunton, the first day of the season for these two teams made up Somerset's first innings. In 105 overs Somerset made a mammoth 580 for 5 declared. Ian Blackwell contributed 191, John Francis 123 and Matthew Wood 95 as Durham UCCE struggled. Francis and Wood's partnership is a new record fifth-wicket partnership for Somerset, beating the 235 put on by Box Case and Jack White in 1927. Somerset declared on their overnight total. However, on a good pitch, Durham UCCE fared well, making a mammoth 304 for the first wicket, and were 327 for 1 at close on the second day. Will Smith scored 156 and Alistair Maiden 211 not out before Durham UCCE were able to declare on 433 for 4, 147 behind. Also, this was against a first-class attack including Andy Caddick and Nixon McLean. Somerset chose to bat out the rest of the day for a draw, finishing on 211 for 2 declared, with John Francis scoring 112. (Cricinfo scorecard)

=== Sussex v Loughborough UCCE (9–11 April) ===
Match drawn

The first day of this match, which was played at Hove, saw Loughborough dismissed for 237. Sussex then reached 15 for no loss at close. Sussex batted through the second day, adding 352 in the 105 overs available, after both Ian Ward and Richard Montgomery both got centuries. Sussex were finally dismissed for 490 on the third and last day. This didn't leave them enough time to dismiss Loughborough UCCE a second time, and they were 103 for 5 at the end of the match. (Cricinfo scorecard)

== The second round of games ==
=== Kent v Cardiff UCCE (13–15 April) ===
Match drawn

Kent had a tough rain-affected first day at the St Lawrence Ground, Canterbury. They struggled against the bowling of Dai Rushbrook, who took 3 for 25 in 8 overs, and Luke Sellers, who took 2 for 23 in 7. At one point they were reduced to 86 for 6, before recovering to 104 for 6 in the 30 overs the weather allowed them before close of play on the first day. The next two days of this three day match were then both abandoned because of rain. (Cricinfo scorecard)

=== Nottinghamshire v Loughborough UCCE (13–15 April) ===
Match drawn

At Trent Bridge Loughborough UCCE won the toss and elected to bat. This allowed Nottinghamshire's Greg Smith to show off his left arm fast-medium bowling that Loughborough's inexperienced students could not cope with. Smith took 5 for 19 as Loughborough UCCE made only 164 to be bowled out before tea. After tea, Darren Bicknell and Jason Gallian scored at a steady 3 runs an over to leave Notts 67 without loss at close on the first day.

The Nottinghamshire innings continued and took up all the second day, and the batsmen got useful match practice before their Championship season started. The highlight was Anurag Singh's 131 from 176 balls with 23 fours and a six. Three other batsmen made half-centuries, including Darren Bicknell, whose 91 took up five minutes short of five hours. The pick of the bowling came from Loughborough UCCE's left-arm spinner David Wainwright. Nottinghamshire were 467 for 8 at close on the second day.

Nottinghamshire continued their innings on the third and final day, allowing Graeme Swann to make his half-century, finishing with 63 off 59 balls. They were finally all out for 532 off 130 overs. Wainwright finished on 4 for 109. This did not leave enough time for Loughborough UCCE to be dismissed a second time. They only needed to survive 47 overs. That seemed in doubt when they tumbled to 38 for 3, before the ship was steadied, and they scored 185 for 4 to claim the draw. Wicket-keeper Paul Harrison scored 54. (Cricinfo scorecard)

== The third round of games ==
=== Oxford UCCE v Derbyshire (20–22 April) ===
Match drawn

The first day at the Parks left Derbyshire at 225 for 8 at close. After recent rain in Oxford, and with a swinging ball in hand, the Oxford UCCE bowlers were commendably accurate. If 2 or 3 more catches had been taken, the scoreline would have looked even more impressive for the students.

On the second day, after Derbyshire moved to 246 all out, Luke Parker, a Warwickshire signing, scored 89 to help Oxford to 245 for 5, just one run behind Derbyshire. The third day saw Oxford UCCE consolidate their lead, and they were finally all out for 372, a lead of 126. The student bowlers were not up to the task of dismissing Derbyshire a second time in the 53 overs that remained. Indeed, they fared poorly, as Jonathan Moss scored 109 not out, with the game ending when the visitors declared on 226 for 2. (Cricinfo scorecard)

=== Surrey v Bradford/Leeds UCCE (20–22 April) ===
Bradford/Leeds UCCE beat Surrey by 4 wickets

The first day at the Oval went according to the script. Surrey piled on 433 for 7 declared, with Richard Clinton scoring a century, and then Bradford/Leeds UCCE got to 31 for 2 by stumps. Rikki Clarke twisted his ankle, and would not bowl again in the match.

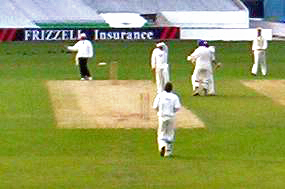
Bradford/Leeds UCCE celebrate as the winning runs are struck.

On the second day, the match changed. Bradford/Leeds UCCE, thanks to Adam Patel (54), James Duffy (64) and a defiant last wicket partnership of 86 between Tom Glover (42*) and Simon Crampton (42), took their score to 333, a deficit of 100. Even worse news for Surrey was a tear to Ian Salisbury's intercostal muscle which put him out of the rest of the game, and a re-aggravated hamstring injury to Martin Bicknell that stopped him bowling further in the match. Surrey then faltered with the bat, finishing the game on 132 for 6.

On the last day, Surrey were dismissed for 217 (although Ian Salisbury was absent hurt), with Glover taking 4 for 47. This left the students with a target of 318 runs off 70 overs. Very much to their credit, they went for it. Thomas Merilaht (56), Duffy (49 in 41 balls), Ryan Bradshaw (89* in 95 balls) and Mohammad Ali (27* off 22 balls) treated the sparse crowd to the sight of a UCCE team consistently finding the boundaries against a spread out field. Bradshaw hit 5 sixes and 8 fours in a match-winning innings. Whilst it was against a second-string Surrey attack (Clarke, Salisbury and Bicknell did not bowl) Bradford/Leeds UCCE were delighted to win with 2.1 overs remaining. (BBC scorecard)

== The fourth round of games ==
=== Hampshire v Cardiff UCCE (27–29 April) ===
Hampshire beat Cardiff UCCE by 95 runs

On the first, rain-affected day Hampshire progressed to 299 for 4 off 76 overs, with Michael Brown putting on 93 at the Rose Bowl. On day 2, Hampshire declared on their overnight score and bowled out Cardiff UCCE. Cardiff UCCE's Christopher Salmons scored 84 not out, an innings that included six fours and five sixes, which made up nearly half of the students' total of 169. Hampshire were 80 for 3, 210 runs ahead, at close. On the third and final day Hampshire declared on 146 for 6, setting a target of 277. Wickets fell at regular intervals, and there was just enough time for Cardiff UCCE to be bowled out for a second time for 181. (BBC scorecard)

=== Leicestershire v Durham UCCE (27–29 April) ===
Match drawn

Leicestershire batted first at Grace Road, and Darren Maddy made the most of his chance against the students. He has scored only one Championship ton in the last two seasons, but got to 124 on the first day. At close, Leicestershire were on 288 for 3. On the second day, they declared on 384 for 4. Durham UCCE went slowly. David Brown finished the day, having batted for over 4 hours and through 237 balls to get an undefeated 68. But after being reduced to 12 for 3, that's exactly what the students needed. They finished on 169 for 6 off 79 overs, 216 behind, but well on the way towards saving the game. On the third day, Durham UCCE went on to score 255 thanks to 73 from David Balcombe, avoiding the follow-on and saving the game. It was only batting practice from there with Leicestershire ending on 187 for 4. (BBC scorecard)

== Second week of May ==
=== Worcestershire v Loughborough UCCE (8–10 May) ===
Loughborough UCCE beat Worcestershire by 8 wickets

Loughborough UCCE had a good first day at Kidderminster, putting on 233 for the loss of 4 wickets. Loughborough's Richard Clinton, who also played thirteen first class games for Surrey this season, made 106, and put on 197 for the first wicket with Edward Foster. They then went on to dominate Worcestershire on the second day. After declaring on 304 for 6, Steven Clark took 5 for 29 as the county team was dismissed for a miserly 133 - with four batsmen, including both openers, making ducks. Only two Worcestershire players, Zander de Bruyn (81) and Jamie Pipe (23) reached double figures. Worcester made 68 for 2 following-on by stumps on the second day.

The third day saw the students wrap up a convincing victory, dismissing Worcestershire for 209 before rattling off the winning runs to finish on 41 for 2. This gave Loughborough UCCE their first first-class win since they were given first-class status three years ago, and represents the second win for a student side of the season (after Bradford/Leeds UCCE beat Surrey). (Cricinfo scorecard)

=== British Universities v Bangladeshis (10–12 May) ===
British Universities drew with the Bangladeshis

The Bangladeshis started their tour of England with an easy warm-up game against British Universities. The Bangladeshis batted first at a chilly Fenner's, but with an unbeaten century from Javed Omar they finished the rain-affected first day on a comfortable 238 for 3, after being reduced to 99 for 3. The second day was also a successful one for the tourists. Omar finished on 167 and Mohammad Ashraful scored 102 as the Bangladeshis finished on 381. In reply, British Universities stuttered to 82 for 5, before Luke Parker and Josh Knappett steadied the ship, leaving the students on 190 for 5 at close, with a draw the most likely result on the third day.

The students finished their innings on 238 on the final day, and the Bangladeshis opted for batting practice, finishing on 246 for 4 declared. Overall, a pleasing first game for the Bangladeshis. (Cricinfo scorecard)

== Third week of May ==
=== Cambridge UCCE v Warwickshire (21–23 May) ===
Warwickshire beat Cambridge UCCE by 18 runs

Warwickshire survived a scare as a virtual second XI still beat the Cambridge students by 18 runs. The first day at Fenner's was ruined by rain, with only 6 overs possible. Warwickshire batted first, losing three wickets for no runs to collapse to 48 for 4, but Jonathan Trott's three-hour 150 not out lifted the visitors to 296 for 6 declared. In reply, Zohail Sharif made an unbeaten fifty as the students made their way to 109 for 1 in just 24 overs. An overnight declaration from the students was followed by an equalling blazing accumulation of runs from Warwickshire led them to 127 for 1. In the reply, Cambridge came too close for comfort, though, and at 281 for 6 with 34 runs left to hit it looked like they could do it - but opening batsman and off spinner Alex Loudon came to the rescue with three wickets for 48, as Cambridge collapsed to 296 all out and lost the match by 18 runs. (Cricinfo scorecard)

== Fourth week of May ==
=== Durham UCCE v Durham (25–27 May) ===
Match drawn

Despite Durham fielding a near first-string line-up, they were nowhere near dominant against the students, Durham making 277 on the first day after David Balcombe took five for 112. In reply, the students made 228 for 9 declared, after two bursts from New Zealand international Nathan Astle. Astle took three for 20, the best bowling figures, making up for his 11 in the first innings. Durham then scored reasonably quick runs, but the game were still heading towards a draw, as Durham were leading by 180 runs at stumps on day two with 8 wickets in hand. Durham made a good go at winning the match, though, making 258 for 7 declared to set the students 308 in 74 overs. With Gareth Breese (3-86) and Graeme Bridge (4-54) taking student wickets at regular intervals, it wasn't enough, as they finished 261 for 9 - 47 runs and one wicket short of a result. (Cricinfo scorecard)

=== Oxford UCCE v Lancashire (25–27 May) ===
Lancashire won by 10 wickets

A second-string Lancashire side gave away 300 runs to the Oxford students, Stephen Moreton making his first first-class fifty as he top-scored with 74. Gary Keedy took four for 46 for Lancashire. Lancashire replied quickly and well, though, making 420, Andrew Crook top scoring with 88. Oxford then crawled to stumps with 24 runs off 14 overs without losing a wicket. However, the third day wasn't nearly as pleasant for Oxford, as Keedy added six for 33 to get a ten-wicket haul in the match. The students were bowled out for 151, leaving a target of 32 which was chased down by Mark Chilton and Iain Sutcliffe, and the Lancastrians won by ten wickets. (Cricinfo scorecard)

== Final MCC University matches ==
=== Cambridge UCCE v Middlesex (1–3 June) ===
Cambridge UCCE beat Middlesex by 2 wickets

Cambridge UCCE's last game against county opposition of the season was against Middlesex at Fenner's, and the students recorded their first first class victory of the year. In 45 overs of possible play on the first day, Middlesex amassed 182 for 2, with Benjamin Hutton making an unbeaten century. They lost Hutton for 111 on the second morning, but pushed onward to 273 for 3 before declaration, and then dismissed Cambridge UCCE for a sorry 151 before reaching 101 for 3 by close on the second day. On the third day they sportingly declared on 154 for 3, leaving Cambridge UCCE to get 277. Despite 75 from Thomas Webley, they looked down and out at 182 for 7. But Garry Park and Tony Palladino, who also played first-class cricket for Essex in 2005, stayed in shared a 76-run partnership before Palladino was caught behind for 30. The remaining runs were then knocked off by Park, who finished on 48, and Philip Edwards, leaving the students narrow victors. (Cricinfo scorecard)

=== Yorkshire v Bradford/Leeds UCCE (1–3 June) ===
Yorkshire beat Bradford/Leeds UCCE by 5 wickets

Bradford/Leeds UCCE's last game against first-class opposition of the season was against Yorkshire at Headingley. The first day was washed out by rain, before both teams subsided for low scores on the second day. First Bradford/Leeds UCCE were all out for 105 with Yorkshireman David Lucas taking 6 for 20 off his 9 overs. In reply Yorkshire managed only 151, despite Simon Guy adding 51 for the sixth wicket with Lucas, and there was still time for Bradford/Leeds to lose 3 wickets for 12 runs before close on the second day. On the third day there was some resistance from James Duffy (49, the highest score of the match) and Mohammed Ali (47), but the students could only make it to 161, leaving Yorkshire a target of 116. They lost 5 wickets in knocking off the runs. (Cricinfo scorecard)

== Oxford v Cambridge ==
=== Cambridge University v Oxford University (17 June) ===
Cambridge University won by five wickets

Economical bowling and poor hitting saw Cambridge get a relatively easy target of 191 against an Oxford side including former England U-19 player Michael Munday. However, the match at Lord's was close right till the end, former Nottinghamshire bowler Thomas Savill smacking 33 off 20 balls after having taken four for 28 with the ball. Munday, meanwhile, was inexplicably left to only bowl five overs - which went for 18 runs. (Cricinfo scorecard)

=== Cambridge University v Oxford University (28 June-1 July) ===
Oxford University won by an innings and 213 runs

Oxford UCCE recorded a thumping victory over Cambridge UCCE in the annual Varsity match between the two universities. At Fenner's, the visitors Oxford won the toss, and made exceptionally good use of the wicket. After losing two early wickets, Indian Salil Oberoi and Birmingham lad Dan Fox entered the frame. The two batted unbeaten till stumps on day 1, leading Oxford to a nearly unassailable 436 for 2, as Oberoi closed on 222 not out - 16 short of the Nawab of Pataudi senior's record - and on the morning of day two, he broke it. With 247, he'd made the highest score ever in a Varsity game - and Fox's and Oberoi's partnership of 408 for the third wicket was an Oxford all-wicket record.

By the time captain and all-rounder Paul McMahon (a former Nottinghamshire player) declared, Oxford were 610 for 5, having two and a half days to bowl out their rivals. Cambridge quickly crumbled to 21 for 3, thanks to three wickets from Amit Suman, but the fourth-wicket partnership yielded 97 runs — as it turned out, 70% of Cambridge's final score for the innings. Captain McMahon's off-spin was responsible for five Cambridge wickets, as they went from 118 for 4 to 129 for 9, amid frequent rainshowers on the third day. Rain stayed away on the fourth day, however, and after taking the final wicket three balls into the day captain McMahon wisely used his spinners - i.e. himself and former England U-19 leg-spinner Michael Munday - to get through the overs quickly. Despite 75 from Anirudh Singh, Cambridge lasted for 106 overs, but were still all out for 268 - and were comprehensively beaten. (Cricinfo scorecard)
