= David Castillo =

David Castillo may refer to:

== Sportsmen ==
- David Castillo, American football player, see Bob Crenshaw Award
- David Castillo (boxer), see April 2005 in sports
- David Castillo (fencer), represented Cuba at the 2007 Pan American Games
- David Castillo (indoor football), played for Erie Explosion

== Others ==
- David Castillo, American art dealer, known for David Castillo Gallery
- David Castillo i Buïls (born 1961), Catalan poet, writer, and literary critic
- David Castillo (actor), Spanish actor
- David B. Castillo, candidate in the United States House of Representatives elections in Washington, 2010
