= Essex County Cricket Club in 2005 =

English cricket club season

Essex Eagles
2005 season
- Captain: Ronnie Irani
- Ground(s): The Ford County Ground; Chelmsford; Southend

Essex County Cricket Club played their cricket during the 2005 season in Division Two of the County Championship and Division One of the Sunday League. They started the season 8–1 to win the Second Division Title, and were second in the Championship table at 9 May, but five matches without a win following that sent them down to fifth place at the Twenty20 break in June. They only intermittently broke into the top three after the Twenty20 break, and when they did their opponents behind them usually had a game in hand. They finished fifth, 15.5 points behind the promotion spot, and with 36 bowling points they picked up the fewest in the entire Division Two. In the National League, however, they only lost once in sixteen games – against Gloucestershire Gladiators in August – and won the League on 28 August with three games to play. In the C&G Trophy, they went out to Lancashire at the second round stage, while they finished fifth in the group stage of the Twenty20 Cup, two points off a guaranteed quarter-final spot.

Essex played 17 first-class games in 2005, winning six, drawing seven and losing four. They also played 18 List A games, winning 14, losing two and having two no-results, and in eight Twenty20 games they won three, lost three and had two no-results.

== Players ==
- Andre Adams
- Danish Kaneria
- André Nel
- Dale Steyn
- Jahid Ahmed
- Justin Bishop
- Ravinder Bopara
- Maurice Chambers
- Andy Clarke
- Alastair Cook
- Ashley Cowan
- Ryan ten Doeschate
- Andy Flower
- Grant Flower
- James Foster
- Darren Gough
- Paul Grayson
- Will Jefferson
- James Middlebrook
- Graham Napier
- Tony Palladino
- Mark Pettini
- Tim Phillips
- Nick Thornicroft
- Alex Tudor
- Mervyn Westfield
- Paul Grayson

== Tables ==
=== Championship ===
2005 County Championship – Division Two
Pos	Team	Pld	W	D	L	Pen	Bat	Bowl	Pts
1	Lancashire	16	7	6	3	0	43	47	212
2	Durham	16	6	8	2	0	45	44	205
3	Yorkshire	16	5	10	1	0.5	49	42	200.5
4	Northamptonshire	16	5	8	3	0	45	46	193
5	Essex	16	5	7	4	0	51	36	185
6	Worcestershire	16	5	4	7	5.5	53	46	179.5
7	Leicestershire	16	3	7	6	0.5	45	45	159.5
8	Somerset	16	4	5	7	0	42	37	155
9	Derbyshire	16	1	7	8	0	31	43	116

=== totesport League ===
2005 totesport League – Division One
Pos	Team	Pld	W	L	NR	Pts
1	Essex Eagles	16	13	1	2	56
2	Middlesex Crusaders	16	10	5	1	42
3	Northamptonshire Steelbacks	16	7	7	2	32
4	Glamorgan Dragons	16	6	6	4	32
5	Nottinghamshire Outlaws	16	6	7	3	30
6	Lancashire Lightning	16	6	9	1	26
7	Gloucestershire Gladiators	16	6	9	1	26
8	Worcestershire Royals	16	5	10	1	22
9	Hampshire Hawks	16	5	10	1	22

=== Twenty20 Group Stage (South) ===
2005 totesport League – Division One
Team	M	W	L	NR	Pts	NRR
Surrey Lions	8	5	3	0	10	+0.64
Middlesex Crusaders	8	4	3	1	9	+0.16
Sussex Sharks	8	3	2	3	9	+0.13
Hampshire Hawks	8	3	2	3	9	+0.20
Essex Eagles	8	3	3	2	8	-0.06
Kent Spitfires	8	1	6	1	3	−1.02

== Match details ==
=== April ===
Their first first-class game of the season was a four wicket win against Cambridge UCCE, as a warm-up before their first County Championship game against Yorkshire, which was drawn after rain fell on all four days. Then there was a rain-affected win in the Sunday League against Hampshire and a mid-week game against Glamorgan, which was abandoned as a "no result" without a ball being bowled. Essex then beat Somerset by nine wickets in the Championship, chasing 77 to win to go second in the Division Two table, seven points behind Durham.

==== MCC University Match: Cambridge UCCE v Essex (9–11 April) ====
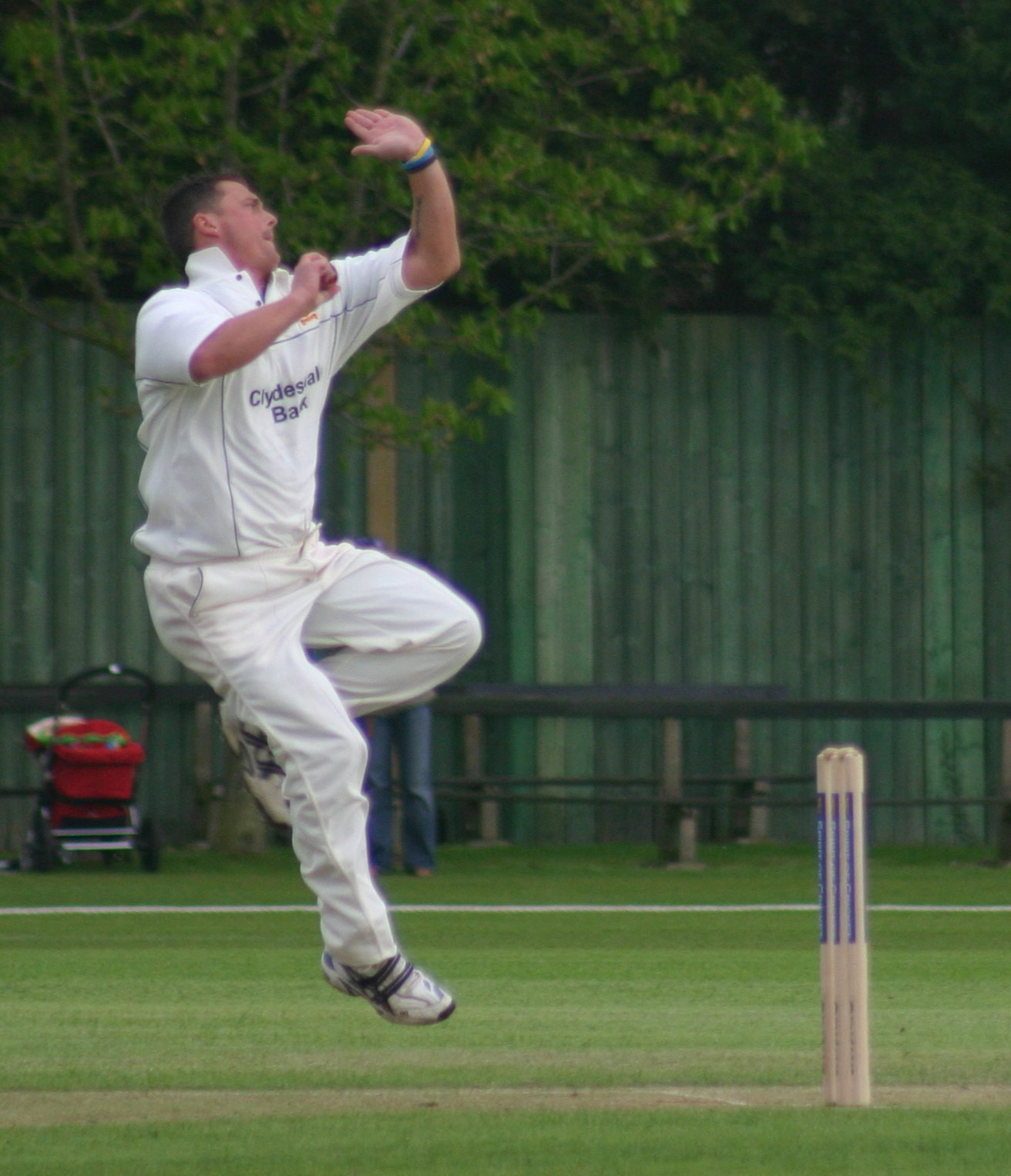
Darren Gough bowling for Essex against Cambridge UCCE

Essex beat Cambridge UCCE by 4 wickets

Cambridge UCCE and Essex started the season at Fenner's Ground in Cambridge. For the first time the Cambridge UCCE team was dominated by players from Anglia Polytechnic University rather than Cambridge University. Cambridge UCCE batted first and completed an innings of 321 on the first day, after being seven down for 139. Matthew Friedlander, who has represented Boland in South Africa, made 81, getting together with Wright, who made 76 to help the students past 300. James Middlebrook took 5 for 54 for Essex. On the second day, Essex put together 307 for 4 declared, although no player scored more than Ravinder Bopara, with 69. Cambridge UCCE scored 64 for 3 by close of play. On the third and final day, Cambridge UCCE piled on more runs, finally declaring on 255 for 4, the top-score of which being 129 not out from Adnan Akram.

This left Essex 270 to win. They lost wickets in doing so, with Palladino (who would later this season go on to play for Essex) taking four wickets, and the students gamely going for a win. However, an all-round performance by Essex finally saw them home with four wickets left. (Cricinfo scorecard)

==== County Championship: Essex v Yorkshire (13–16 April) ====
Essex (12pts) drew with Yorkshire (5.5pts)

At Chelmsford, Yorkshire won the toss and put Essex in to bat. Essex lost two of ten wickets on the first day, as Will Jefferson, Essex' 6'10'' opener put on 149 before being out leg before just before the end of the first day's play. Essex captain, Ronnie Irani, said, "People think his height is a weakness, they try and over-test it – they try and pitch it up too much or bowl short too much." Jefferson could have been run out for 0 after a mix-up with Cook – who fell early for 11 – and was dropped on 6. However, Jefferson was given support by Zimbabwean Grant Flower, who was 55 not out at close, with Essex on 224 for 2, after 26 overs were lost to rain. Seven Yorkshire bowlers were used, but few had any success, and England bowler Matthew Hoggard went wicketless on the first day.

A total of 47 overs were possible in the next two days, as Essex moved on to 394 for 4 – losing two men to Hoggard. Andy Flower, Grant's brother, and Ronnie Irani were on unbeaten half-centuries at the close of the third day's play, a draw a virtual certainty.

After adding 7 in 11 balls on the fourth and final day, Essex declared on 401 for 4, batting on to score the extra bonus point before putting Yorkshire in. Whilst Yorkshire's captain, Craig White, resisted with 59 not out, the team were bowled out for 205, 196 behind. Essex enforced the follow-on, but as rain affected play and cutting down the length of their innings, Yorkshire held on. Jaques scored 67 not out from 88 balls out of his team's 105 for 2, as Yorkshire escaped with the draw, but were fined 0.5 points for a slow over rate during Essex' innings. (Cricinfo scorecard)

==== National League: Hampshire v Essex (17 April) ====
Essex (4pts) beat Hampshire (0pts) by 16 runs (D/L method)

At the Rose Bowl, Hampshire Hawks batted first, scoring 175 for 9, as Tim Phillips took 3 for 31. It was a good day for spin, with Grant Flower also taking 2 wickets. In reply, Essex Eagles' Will Jefferson was 44 not out, and Essex 69 for 2 off 16 overs when rain put an end to play, leaving Essex the winners on the Duckworth–Lewis method. England's star one-day player of the winter, Kevin Pietersen, managed only 5 off 14 balls for Hampshire before being bowled. (BBC scorecard)

==== National League: Glamorgan v Essex (22 April) ====
Match abandoned – Glamorgan (2pts), Essex (2pts)

This match, which was scheduled to be played at Sophia Gardens, Cardiff was abandoned without a ball being bowled. It was the first time for almost eight years a one-day league match at Cardiff has ended as a no-result. (BBC scorecard)

==== County Championship: Somerset v Essex (27–30 April) ====
Essex (22pts) beat Somerset (2pts) by nine wickets

On 35 overs were possible on the first day. On a green Taunton pitch, Somerset fared poorly against Essex's seam attack. Alex Tudor, who had moved from Surrey, took the first two wickets, including Marcus Trescothick for 4. Somerset were on 119 for 5 at stumps.

Somerset were soon dismissed on the Thursday for 190. Essex's youngsters, Alastair Cook, who looked to be headed for an England call-up before long, and Ravinder Bopara, aged 20 and 19 respectively, made merry with the bat. Although the pitch did not seam as much as the first day, they put on 181 together. Cook was finally out bowled for 111, and Bopara not out for 71 at close, with Essex on 224 for 3, 34 runs ahead.

Bopara could not add to his overnight total on the third day, as he was caught off Richard Johnson's bowling. But Essex were able to take control, finally declaring on 427 for 8 when Tudor was run out for 57. Somerset's fast bowlers, Johnson and Andy Caddick had picked up three wickets each, but had not been able to stop the flow of runs. Foster was not out on 78 when the declaration came. In reply, Somerset fared okay till Trescothick went with the score on 57, and then, at 65 for 1, Andre Adams, Essex's New Zealand import took a hat-trick. Mike Burns edged an outswinger, and Sanath Jayasuriya and James Hildreth were both leg before. With Adams picking up one more wicket before the close of play, Somerset finished on 128 for 5, still 109 runs off making Essex bat again.

On the Saturday, Somerset's tail was quickly reduced to 180 for 8. There was then something of a rearguard action with 63 put on by Caddick and Robert Turner for the ninth wicket, and Turner and Nixon McLean putting on 70 for the tenth. This left Essex with a target of 77 to win, which they did easily with the loss of just one wicket. (BBC scorecard)

=== May ===
May began with wins over Devon (in the C&G Trophy) and Leicestershire in the Championship, before they played out a draw against Northamptonshire despite trailing by 374 runs on first innings, as they batted out the remainder of the match to make 495 for 6. Following that, a League game against Glamorgan was won by five wickets. On 17 May they were eliminated from the C&G Trophy at the second round stage at Old Trafford. Two Championship matches followed, a defeat against Worcestershire which saw them go out of the promotion zone and a draw with Yorkshire, which left them third in the table behind Durham and Yorkshire at the end of May, though with Worcestershire trailing four points behind with a game in hand.

==== C&G Trophy Round One: Devon v Essex (3–4 May) ====
Essex beat Devon by 180 runs to progress to Round Two of the C&G Trophy

No play was possible on the originally scheduled day of play at Exmouth because of rain, and the reserve day had to be used. When play started on what was a wettish pitch with a slow outfield Essex hit over the top and ended on 264 for 5 off their 50 overs, with Andy Flower and Ravinder Bopara recording half-centuries. Devon were bowled out for just under a third of that score, making 84, although that could be seen as a recovery from 23 for 6 – a position they were in thanks to Essex pacers Andre Adams and Darren Gough, who shared three wickets each with the new ball. Devon's Neil Hancock, who turned out in two Twenty20 games and one National League match for Somerset in 2004, top scored with 40 despite batting at seven. (Cricinfo scorecard)

==== County Championship: Essex v Leicestershire (6–9 May) ====
Essex (21pts) beat Leicestershire (3.5pts) by six wickets

In a relatively closely fought game at Chelmsford, the Essex team showed more resilience than the visitors, as all the Essex players contributed with either 25 runs, five wickets or five catches. It started with a good bowling effort on the first day after Ronnie Irani had chosen to put Leicestershire in. Darren Robinson and Darren Maddy then put on 98 as Essex failed to get a wicket in the first hour and a half, but the part-time medium pace of Essex number three Ravinder Bopara got Maddy out, and four middle-order batsmen were dismissed in single figures as Leicestershire lost eight wickets for 69. David Masters (27) and Phil DeFreitas (20) added 49 for the ninth wicket to take Leicestershire to a final total of 220 in 81 overs. Dale Steyn, the young South African pace bowler with three Test caps, took three for 69 on Essex debut, but Darren Gough got the best figures with three for 46 – including Robinson, Paul Nixon for a golden duck and DeFreitas.

Every Essex batsman except number 11 Steyn (run out for 0) scored in double figures, and William Jefferson top-scoring with 93 as Essex got into a relatively comfortable lead of 142, despite three wickets from DeFreitas and Ottis Gibson. Leicestershire surpassed their first innings score with five wickets in hand the second time around, though, before Gough and Napier dug out two wickets to have them 228 for 7. Robinson, Dinesh Mongia, Aftab Habib and HD Ackerman had all passed 30, and Claude Henderson paired up with Ackerman to add 96 for the eighth wicket – the second-highest partnership of the match, as Leicestershire made their way to a lead of 190. Gough was the only bowler to take more than two wickets, ending with four for 60, while Steyn conceded 102 runs in his 21-over effort, although he did get the wickets of Robinson and Gibson.

Essex had the entire fourth day to secure their victory, though they only spent half of it. Their 191 runs were up inside 44.2 overs, England A left-hander Alastair Cook the fastest scorer with 59 off 69 balls while Zimbabwean keeper Andy Flower finished with 74 not out to lead Essex to their target. Leicestershire were trying to slow the chase down by bowling few overs, and were deducted half a point for the slow over rate.(Cricinfo scorecard)

==== County Championship: Northamptonshire v Essex (11–14 May) ====
Northamptonshire (12pts) drew with Essex (6pts)

At Northampton the home side batted first. Bilal Shafayat (153) and Usman Afzaal (168) scored centuries to help Northamptonshire to 552 for 7 declared. When Essex finally got to bat after nearly nine hours in the field, Johann Louw took 6 for 51, as Essex lost their last seven wickets for 44. Three batsmen were dismissed for ducks by Louw, and another for three, as Essex made a total of 178. The follow-on was enforced, and Essex batted for nearly eleven hours to draw the game. Alastair Cook made a career-best 195 in 513 minutes, supported by Zimbabwean Andy Flower, who made 142 not out, as Essex made it to the draw by making 495 for 6 declared. (Cricinfo scorecard)

==== National League: Essex v Glamorgan (15 May) ====
Essex (4pts) beat Glamorgan (0pts) by five wickets

Essex Eagles continued their unbeaten run in all cricket this season, after getting the 185 runs they needed for the last six wickets against Glamorgan Dragons at Chelmsford. Essex won the toss and chose to field first, and Glamorgan made 216 for 7. James Middlebrook was the main contributor with the ball, taking two for 27 off 9 overs, but South African pace bowler Dale Steyn also contributed with three for 34 amid no-balls and wides. Andrew Davies and David Harrison then reduced Essex to 31 for 4 before Ravinder Bopara (96 not out) and, once again, Middlebrook (46) took centre stage. With a partnership of 122, the two cut nearly two-thirds off the target, and wicket-keeper James Foster contributed with 38 off 30 balls to see Essex to the target with five wickets and sixteen balls to spare. (Cricinfo scorecard)

==== C&G Trophy Round Two: Lancashire v Essex (17 May) ====
Lancashire beat Essex by 6 wickets to progress to the Quarter-Finals of the C&G Trophy

Andrew Flintoff took four for 26 and the other five bowlers dug out a wicket each, as Essex made 195 for 9 en route to their first of two one-day defeats in the 2005 season, Ravinder Bopara top-scoring with 42 off 83 balls. In reply, Lancashire's opening partnership of Mal Loye and Stuart Law put on 53 in 10.1 overs at Old Trafford, before Alex Tudor dismissed them both. Brad Hodge, however, kept the run rate up by scoring at nearly five an over, well ahead of the required four. Hodge was dropped on 32, and Lancashire might have been put under pressure if it had been taken, but instead he went on to make 82 off 102 balls before he was caught behind off Tim Phillips, as Lancashire made their target with 6 wickets and 6 overs to spare. (Inningsbreak scorecard)

==== County Championship: Essex v Worcestershire (20–23 May) ====
Worcestershire (21pts) beat Essex (4pts) by eight wickets

Essex and Worcestershire scored runs at a rate of nearly four an over in the match at Chelmsford, and thus the match ended in a result despite some 40 overs being lost to rain. Ronnie Irani, with 85, was the only one to pass 40 for Essex, while Matthew Mason and Gareth Batty took wickets amid showers on the first day. Essex totalled 220 in their first innings, Mason taking four for 48, Batty three for 26, and Sri Lankan overseas player Chaminda Vaas going wicketless. In reply, Ben Smith made a century including fourteen fours, and with help of Gareth Batty (54) and Kabir Ali (53), both former England players, Worcestershire got to 383 all out – a lead of 163. Alastair Cook, Essex' 20-year-old prodigy, made a quick 46 in reply, but it was their 37-year-old Zimbabwean Andy Flower who was the top scorer, lasting three and a half hours at the crease and pairing up with five different batsmen for his 85 – which led them to 329.

Setting Worcestershire 167 to win, Essex got two wickets before the close of play on day three, removing opener Stephen Peters for 0 and nightwatchman and wicketkeeper Jamie Pipe for 11, caught off Darren Gough and Dale Steyn respectively. On the fourth day, however, Stephen Moore built on his good batting form after 246 against Derbyshire a week before, however, making 63 not out and adding 146 up with Graeme Hick (76 not out) to secure an eight-wicket win and go past Essex in the table. (Cricinfo scorecard)

==== County Championship: Yorkshire v Essex (25–28 May) ====
Essex (12pts) drew with Yorkshire (9pts)

Centuries from Andy Flower (188) and Ronnie Irani (103) along with 93 from the former Yorkshire player Darren Gough helped Essex to a total of 622 for 8 declared at Headingley. The total was Essex' highest in the 2005 season. Essex were 76 for 4 after two wickets from Deon Kruis, but after that Yorkshire's bowlers conceded 136.5 runs for every wicket, and the partnerships for the fifth to eighth wicket were all worth more than 100 runs for Essex. The highest stand was between Andy Flower and Irani, who added 213 for the fifth wicket.

New Zealand all-rounder Andre Adams then took two early wickets to dig into the Yorkshire effort, and they finished the second day on 53 for 2. The third day saw runs hit at a rate just below three an over by Yorkshire, as only Gough could take more than one wicket – ending with five for 85. Yorkshire saw out the day to end on 336 for 8, meaning that Essex would have to take twelve wickets on the final day to win the game. They only dug out seven – Tim Bresnan, Chris Silverwood and Deon Kruis frustrating them to build a further 72 runs overnight in the first innings, and following on Yorkshire withstood the spin of James Middlebrook who had to bowl 29 of 68 Essex overs. Yorkshire made their way to 238 for 5 with Phil Jaques and Anthony McGrath making half-centuries, after an opening stand of 94. (BBC scorecard) (Cricketarchive scorecard)

==== National League: Nottinghamshire v Essex (30 May) ====
Essex (4pts) beat Nottinghamshire (0pts) by six wickets

Former England international Darren Gough took four wickets for 16 runs, including both opening batsmen, as Essex Eagles took a six-wicket win at Trent Bridge over Nottinghamshire Outlaws to keep their unbeaten record going and to go second in the table. Nottinghamshire were bowled out for 154 as Essex off-spinner James Middlebrook helped out Gough, taking two for 27 including the wicket of top-scorer David Hussey. Essex' batsmen all got past 20 in the chase – excluding Ravinder Bopara who made a duck – and captain Ronnie Irani, opening the batting, guided Essex to 94 for 2 with a run-a-ball 53. Andy Flower then took Essex to the target after putting on 50 with brother Grant. (Cricinfo scorecard)

=== June ===
June started with a draw in the Championship against Derbyshire, before taking a last-wicket National League win against Middlesex at Lord's to go top of the National League. Four days later, they travelled to the Riverside Ground to take on Durham in a top-of-the-table battle in the Championship, but Essex lost by an innings and 19 runs inside three days to fall to fourth. However, they recorded National League wins over Gloucestershire and Worcestershire, to take a four-point lead in the National League before the Twenty20 break.

==== County Championship: Essex v Derbyshire (1–4 June) ====
Derbyshire (11pts) drew with Essex (9pts)

Derbyshire batted first at Chelmsford, and they put on 462 with Steve Stubbings making 92 and Graeme Welch 112. Essex lost quick wickets in reply, going to 34 for 4, but then Ronnie Irani, James Foster and James Middlebrook all made half-centuries as the hosts made 320. Derbyshire, who were without a win all season, declared at lunchtime on the fourth day, at 236 for 3 from 63 overs, with Michael Di Venuto making 110. A half-century from Alastair Cook and a maiden first-class century from Ravinder Bopara saw Essex through to the draw on 245 for 5, well short of their theoretical target of 379. (Cricinfo scorecard)

==== National League: Middlesex v Essex (5 June) ====
Essex (4pts) beat Middlesex (0pts) by one wicket

Essex Eagles won the top of the table clash in the National League against Middlesex Crusaders at Lord's, after hitting 50 runs for the last two wickets to seal victory. Middlesex' innings opened with a 101-run partnership from Paul Weekes and Ed Smith, lasting nearly an hour and a half, as the pair scored at about four an over. A burst of wickets followed, which reduced Middlesex to 144 for 5, but a display of aggressive hitting from Scott Styris – who scored 71 from 43 balls, including seven sixes – took the target up to 244. In reply, Essex scored runs to be on a par with the required rate, but lost wickets, Irfan Pathan grabbing two and the others helping out as Essex lost their first seven for 182, and Ryan ten Doeschate and former England all-rounder Alex Tudor were at the crease. Tudor went quickly, as did No. 10 Andre Adams, and Essex required 26 for the last wicket. But ten Doeschate, who had earlier been taken for 25 runs in his only over, now made up for it by hitting eight boundaries as the Dutch-South African recorded a career highest score of 51 not out off 41 balls, taking Essex to the target with three balls and a wicket to spare. His batting partner, Darren Gough, contributed with four runs in the seven-minute last-wicket stand worth 26. (Cricinfo scorecard)

==== County Championship: Durham v Essex (9–11 June) ====
Durham (22pts) beat Essex (3pts) by an innings and 19 runs

Durham continued their run of unbeaten matches in the 2005 season by defeating Essex in just three days at Chester-le-Street. Durham batted first, and made a total of 505 in the first innings, with Gordon Muchall and stand-in captain Dale Benkenstein both making centuries and ten batsmen made it into double figures. The Durham bowlers then backed up the batsmen's efforts by seeing off the Essex batsmen in just 55 overs to leave them all out for 106, Ashley Noffke and Mark Davies taking four wickets each. Essex followed on 399 behind, and were 140 for 6 after three wickets from Davies, despite nightwatchman Dale Steyn making 82. However, number nine Andre Adams made 103, James Foster added 78, and Essex made it to 366 for 7 – before Davies grabbed two wickets, and Neil Killeen dismissed Foster to give Durham an innings win despite lacking internationals Paul Collingwood, Steve Harmison and Mike Hussey. They did have New Zealand international Nathan Astle in the side – he contributed with 15 runs and no wicket for 24. (BBC scorecard)

==== National League: Essex v Gloucestershire (17 June) ====
Essex (4pts) beat Gloucestershire (0pts) by 55 runs

Andy Flower took the Gloucestershire Gladiators' bowlers for 127 runs in 93 balls at The County Ground in Chelmsford as he and Ronnie Irani paired up for 139 to send Essex Eagles to a final score of 271 for 7. Upul Chandana got the most expensive figures, with 64 runs off nine overs, but James Averis also conceded six an over – and unlike Chandana, he did not take a wicket. In reply, Alex Tudor snared out a couple of wickets in the first 20 minutes, and Gloucestershire lost nine men for 182 after three wickets from Pakistani spinner Danish Kaneria. Even a hit-out from Chandana – who scored 32 off 30 balls, his highest score in six innings in 2005 – was not enough to take a win from the Eagles, their fifth of the season. Essex thus went top of the National League table along with Middlesex. (Cricinfo scorecard)

==== National League: Worcestershire v Essex (19 June) ====
Essex (4pts) beat Worcestershire (0pts) by 39 runs

In these teams' last match before the Twenty20 season started, played at New Road in Worcester, Essex Eagles prevailed to take a four-point lead into the month-long break as their bowlers took out Worcestershire for 164 to defend a total of 203 for 9. Having won the toss, skipper Ronnie Irani was the first victim of the Worcestershire Royals bowling, as he departed for a three-ball duck in the third over. Chaminda Vaas and Ray Price got two wickets each as Essex' batting made it to 167 for 8, but Ryan ten Doeschate took them past 200 with a 38-ball 34. Worcestershire started with a 66-run opening stand between Graeme Hick and Stephen Moore, but part-timer William Jefferson removed both of them in quick succession. Jefferson ended with the bowling analysis of 4–0–9–2, in his only bowling effort of the season, as Worcestershire put on 98 for the last nine wickets – 40 short of the required runs to win. Stephen Peters made 41 not out from number six, but after Moore and Hick he was the only batsman to pass 20, as James Middlebrook grabbed three wickets and Andre Adams and Ravinder Bopara two each. (Cricinfo scorecard)

=== Twenty20 Cup Group Stage ===
Essex began their Twenty20 Cup with a loss against Sussex Sharks, but came back to beat Kent Spitfires and the Sharks in their two next matches. Rainy weather in the South Division resulted in two abandoned matches, meaning that five teams were challenging for two or three play-off places, and Essex were one of them, as they were third with a game to play after beating Surrey in a five-over match at Chelmsford by a solitary run. Their last match was against the Spitfires, who were yet to win in seven Twenty20 matches this season, but Kent came up trumps as they won by five runs, sending Essex into fifth place in the group and out of the quarter-finals.

==== Sussex v Essex (22 June) ====
Sussex (2pts) beat Essex (0pts) by nine wickets

Essex Eagles lost their last nine wickets for 54 runs, and the target of 110 was not enough to win their first match of the 2005 Twenty20 Cup to Sussex Sharks. Winning the toss and batting, Essex made their way to 55 for 1 in the sixth over, as Ronnie Irani hit 34 off 18 balls. But the dismissal of Irani and then James Middlebrook for 29 set them back to 73 for 3, before Andy Flower was run out. Grant Flower put on 14 with Ryan ten Doeschate, before Mushtaq Ahmed ended their innings with five for 11 from 21 deliveries – as Essex posted an all-out total of 109, losing their last six wickets for 11. Sussex scored at a rate around 7.5 runs an over, with Matt Prior scoring an unbeaten 66 off 50 balls, and 14 extras helped the Sharks past the target after 14.4 overs. Andre Adams was the only Essex bowler to take a wicket, dismissing Ian Ward in the third over. (Cricinfo scorecard)

==== Essex v Kent (24 June) ====
Essex (2pts) beat Kent (0pts) by 29 runs

The match at Chelmsford was shortened by the English rain, as both sides were limited to 12 overs. Andy Flower made 46 off 29 balls, and 17 extras boosted the Essex Eagles run-rate to exactly eleven an over. Defending 133, Essex got off to a good start as Tony Palladino took two wickets in the second over, Matthew Walker and Justin Kemp scored at 7.5 an over – well below the required 11 – and though Essex conceded nine extras, Kent Spitfires finished on 103 for 4, thirty runs short of their winning target. (Cricinfo scorecard)

==== Essex v Sussex (26 June) ====
Essex (2pts) beat Sussex (0pts) by 43 runs

After Sussex bowler Johannes van der Wath had taken two wickets inside seven minutes and sent Essex Eagles to six for two at Chelmsford, Andy Flower (59) and Ryan ten Doeschate (42 not out from number six) rebuilt to send the hosts to 151 for 5 after their 20 overs. Sussex lost two wickets in the first two overs, falling to seven for two, and though Chris Adams made 44, only one batsman passed 20 as Grant Flower took three wickets for a single run, and James Middlebrook (two for 16) and Andre Adams (two for 12) took the final wickets as Sussex were bowled out for 108. (Cricinfo scorecard)

==== Hampshire v Essex (28 June) ====
Match abandoned; Hampshire (1pt), Essex (1pt)

Hampshire Hawks and Essex Eagles shared the spoils as the match at The Rose Bowl, Southampton never got underway. (Cricinfo scorecard)

==== Essex v Hampshire (29 June) ====
No result; Essex (1pt), Hampshire (1pt)

Hampshire Hawks and Essex Eagles played out their second no-result in their two days, after the Hawks batted to a total of 151 for 9 in their 20 overs, with Greg Lamb making 67. However, the Essex innings never got off, due to rain. (Cricinfo scorecard)

==== Middlesex v Essex (1 July) ====
Middlesex (2pts) beat Essex (0pts) by 31 runs

Middlesex Crusaders defeated Essex Eagles despite missing Irish batsman Ed Joyce, who had gone off to play in the 2005 ICC Trophy. The opening partnership between Owais Shah and Ed Smith yielded 100 runs, Shah eventually making 79, and despite three wickets from Essex off-spinner James Middlebrook, Middlesex finished on 185 for 6 as Irfan Pathan hit two sixes to end with 21. Pathan then took three wickets inside 20 minutes, those of Alistair Cook, Ronnie Irani and Ravinder Bopara, and Essex were 45 for 5. James Foster made 62 not out at just the rate required to win, but Andre Adams could only hit at 7.5 an over as Essex finished on 154 for 7, 32 short of victory. Pathan had Adams caught near the end to finish with four for 27. (Cricinfo scorecard)

==== Essex v Surrey (5 July) ====
Essex (2pts) beat Surrey (0pts) by one run

Rain ravaged The County Ground, Chelmsford and delayed the match between Essex Eagles and Surrey Lions to after ten o'clock. When it finally began, it had been shortened to five overs a side, and Essex made runs at a run rate above 14, totalling 71 for 3 – Ronnie Irani making 32, while Azhar Mahmood took two wickets for three runs in his only ver for Surrey. In reply, Tony Palladino took two wickets for Essex, but Surrey needed eight off five after James Middlebrook bowled a wide that went for four – however, he only conceded six runs from the remaining balls of the game, and Surrey finished on 70 for 2. Yet, they would have to be exceedingly unlucky in their last game to be eliminated, as they led the group two points ahead of number three, Essex. (Cricinfo scorecard)

==== Kent v Essex (6 July) ====
Kent (2pts) beat Essex (0pts) by five runs

Dane Amjad Khan, who missed the 2005 ICC Trophy and most of the Twenty20 Cup due to injury, returned to cricket with a spell of three for 24 to set Essex Eagles back to 26 for 3. Before that, Khan's Kent Spitfires had batted first, setting a target of 155 to win after left-hander Michael Carberry hit 59 not out, while Essex' New Zealand bowler Andre Adams took two for 12 off three overs. However, the Spitfires kept taking wickets, grabbing seven as Essex' innings stopped on 149 – Mark Pettini making 60 in a losing cause before he was run out, while Andrew Hall joined in with Khan as he grabbed two for 30 for Kent. (Cricinfo scorecard)

=== July ===
Coming back after the Twenty20 knock-out, Essex continued their run of unbeaten games in the National League. Topping the league before the interval, Essex continued with victories over Northamptonshire and Lancashire to open up an eight-point gap at the top of the table, being undefeated after nine of sixteen games. To add to that, they beat Northamptonshire by ten wickets in the County Championship, ensuring they were still only three points off the third and last promotion spot.

After their one-day win over Lancashire, they stayed in the North, drawing their County Championship match with the Lancastrians, and then travelled to Grace Road to draw a match with Leicestershire – their sixth draw of the season, which left them three points adrift of the promotion places at the end of July, having played a game more than the third-placed Lancashire side.

==== National League: Essex v Northamptonshire (8 July) ====
Essex (4pts) beat Northamptonshire (0pts) by five wickets

Essex Eagles recorded their seventh win in eight attempts in the National League, cementing their place at the top. After Northamptonshire Steelbacks won the toss and batted at Chelmsford, three run-outs and Grant Flower's bowling, which yielded three for 21, saw them go from 185 for 5 to 200 all out. Essex's reply saw Flower hit 90 not out after Essex had been 95 for 4, and as Dutch-South African Ryan ten Doeschate hit 29 not out Essex went past the target with ten balls to spare. (Cricinfo scorecard)

==== County Championship: Essex v Northamptonshire (10–13 July) ====
Essex (22pts) beat Northamptonshire (3pts) by ten wickets

Essex won the match at Chelmsford, where spinners took 24 of the 30 wickets to fall. Batting first, Essex made 506 against Northamptonshire, despite Monty Panesar taking a career best seven-wicket-haul in the innings, but conceded 181 runs in the process from 56.3 overs. The Northamptonshire reply was stifled by four wickets from James Middlebrook, as they lost their first six wickets for 141, but Ben Phillips and Damien Wright added 95 for the seventh wicket before Tony Palladino grabbed three wickets in four balls, and they finished on 247.

Following on 259 behind, Northamptonshire had made 203 for 2 when Essex' captain Ronnie Irani brought Alastair Cook on as his seventh bowler. The off-spinner, normally an opening batsmen, claimed his first first-class wicket by dismissing Usman Afzaal lbw for 47, and also got Bilal Shafayat and Riki Wessels out as three Northamptonshire wickets fell for five runs, and Danish Kaneria wrapped up the rest of Northamptonshire's batsmen, ending with six for 74 as Northants bowed out for 261. Chasing a target of 3, William Jefferson hit a four with the second ball of Essex' innings, thus ending the game. (Cricinfo scorecard)

==== National League: Lancashire v Essex (19 July) ====
Essex (4pts) beat Lancashire (0pts) by eight wickets (D/L method)

In cloudy conditions at Old Trafford, Essex Eagles grabbed eight Lancashire Lightning wickets and limited seven batsmen to sub-15 scores in a match shortened to 40 overs a side. Only Iain Sutcliffe and Mark Chilton passed 15 for Lancashire, while spinners Danish Kaneria and James Middlebrook shared five wickets between them. Lancashire eventually finished on 154 for 8, and Essex were set 156 to win due to a small rain-interruption in Lancashire's innings. Despite two wickets from James Anderson, Essex made it to the target with more than seven overs to spare, Grant Flower making 66 and Ravinder Bopara an unbeaten 45. (Cricinfo scorecard)

==== County Championship: Lancashire v Essex (21–24 July) ====
Lancashire (10pts) drew with Essex (9pts)

Essex batted through five sessions to make 536 for 9 declared at Old Trafford. Grant Flower made 115 before being caught behind off Gary Keedy, while his brother Andy made 138. Australian Andrew Crook got the best figures for Lancashire, three for 71 with his part-time off-spin, but also conceded runs at 7.1 an over – more than any other Lancs bowler. When Lancashire batted, their number three Mal Loye replied with 194 after Andre Adams had the hosts' captain Mark Chilton caught behind for 4. Loye spent 200 balls for his century at the crease and eventually ended up with an innings lasting 460 minutes before he was caught by Alastair Cook off Grant Flower, six runs short of what could have been his second double century in July 2005. After Loye's efforts, Lancashire batted 220.3 overs – Danish Kaneria bowling 70.2 of those without a single wicket – to make 655 for 6 before the captains agreed to a draw. (Cricinfo scorecard)

==== County Championship: Leicestershire v Essex (26–29 July) ====
Leicestershire (11pts) drew with Essex (8pts)

Ronnie Irani and Alastair Cook, who both made fifties, lifted Essex to 297 after being put in to bat at Grace Road. David Masters was Leicestershire's best bowler, with four for 65, and he bowled eleven maidens in 25 overs. However, Masters and the rest of the Leicestershire middle order showed precariously little resistance with the bat, as Darren Gough took two quick wickets before stumps on day 1 and Tony Palladino joined in with two more as Leicestershire imploded to 20 for 4. John Maunders and Aftab Habib lifted Leicestershire to a more respectable score, but they were still 132 for 6 at close on day 2, with half the second day's play lost due to rain. The third day was rained off, and on the fourth day Habib went on to make an unbeaten 153, Leicestershire declared on 382 for 8, and the match ended in a draw as Essex easily survived 29 overs to make 80 for 2. (Cricinfo scorecard)

=== August ===
August began with a win over Championship leaders Durham at their secondary home ground in Southend, as Essex took third place in the table and closed the gap to 22 points. Middlesex visited Southend the following day, and Essex won a closely fought game by two runs to take an eight-point lead over second-placed Middlesex with two games in hand – with 16 points to number three and six games to play. The next week-end, they suffered a 60-run loss to Gloucestershire after they were bowled out for 122, but as Middlesex also lost to Northamptonshire the next week-end, Essex went closer to the title. A midweek Championship match saw the team go down to a 120-run first innings deficit against Derbyshire in Derby, but they still won the match, sending them into second place in the Division Two table. A no-result in the National League extended their lead to ten points with four games remaining, before they declared twice in a rain-hit match with Somerset and lost by five wickets. The next day – the last Sunday in August – they won the National League win over Hampshire Hawks to take their first major trophy since winning the Natwest Trophy in 1997.

==== County Championship: Essex v Durham (3–6 August) ====
Essex (18pts) beat Durham (3pts) by two wickets

Durham won the toss at Southend-on-Sea, and their first innings lasted two sessions for 196, New Zealander Andre Adams taking five for 60 while Danish Kaneria took three for 30 for Essex. Essex also lost five wickets on the first day, to trail by 89, and as Tony Palladino and James Middlebrook were dismissed in quick succession Durham were 62 behind with three wickets in hand, with Australian Michael Lewis having taken four for 69. However, opener Alastair Cook was still there, and he was eventually last out after batting for four and a half hours, crafting 107 as Essex made it to 245 and a lead of 49. Adams dug out both openers when Durham returned to bat, but four partnerships of more than 40 – the highest between Dale Benkenstein and Gareth Breese, who added 92 – saw Durham to a first-innings total of 347, as captain Benkenstein top-scored with 124.

Essex needed 299 to win, and had four sessions to do it. They lost Ravinder Bopara after 12 minutes, caught off Liam Plunkett, but Andy Flower and Alastair Cook forged a 72-run partnership before Durham medium-pacer Mark Davies struck and had Cook caught behind. At stumps on day three, Essex were 129 for 2. Lewis and Gareth Breese did a lot of bowling for Durham on the fourth day, totalling 65.1 of Durham's total of 100.1 overs, and after Ronnie Irani departed for 48, Durham limited the Essex partnerships to no more than 25. Andy Flower stood tall, however, spending six and a half hours at the crease to end with 132 not out – and his eighth-wicket partnership of 25 saw Essex cut the target to 10. Palladino hung in there with Flower, contributing a single, and Essex won by two wickets. (Cricinfo scorecard)

==== National League: Essex v Middlesex (7 August) ====
Essex (4pts) beat Middlesex (0pts) by four runs

Essex Eagles extended their lead in the National League to eight points with a win over Middlesex Crusaders. Batting first, they had been worried by the opponents' captain Ben Hutton, who took three for 42, including top-scorer Ronnie Irani, as Essex were 118 for 6 at one point. The Dutch international Ryan ten Doeschate made 44 off 37 balls, with four fours, and played a major part in getting the Essex total to 202 for 8. Middlesex' top-order were taken out by Essex' bowlers, as only Paul Weekes passed 20 from the top seven, while Ed Smith and Ed Joyce both recorded ducks. At 102 for 6, and with skipper Hutton gone for 2, Middlesex still needed 101 runs with only four wickets in hand, but a patient 71-run partnership between Weekes and Ben Scott left Middlesex to hit 31 runs for the last three wickets when Weekes was lbw to Danish Kaneria. Scott hogged the strike, but could not get the necessary boundaries, and Middlesex finished their 45 overs on 198 for 9, five runs short of a victory that would have put them level on points with Essex. (Cricinfo scorecard)

==== National League: Gloucestershire v Essex (14 August) ====
Gloucestershire (4pts) beat Essex (0pts) by 60 runs

Essex Eagles fell to 122 all out in chase of 183 to win, losing their first game of the season, while Gloucestershire Gladiators recorded their fourth victory in eleven games to take them out of the relegation zone. Batting first, Gloucestershire were bowled out for 182 in 44.1 of the 45 overs, Matt Windows top-scoring with 57 while Darren Gough and Grant Flower took three wickets each. Malinga Bandara and Martyn Ball shared the highest partnership of the match, adding 59 runs for the ninth wicket to carry Gloucestershire from 118 for 8. Essex then lost their first seven wickets for 49 runs, James Averis finishing with figures of 8–2–9–2, while Ball and Mark Alleyne also grabbed two wickets each. Despite 46 from New Zealand all-rounder Andre Adams, Essex ended all out for 122 when Adams was caught off the bowling of Mark Hardinges. (Cricinfo scorecard)

==== County Championship: Derbyshire v Essex (16–19 August) ====
Essex (19pts) beat Derbyshire (6pts) by five wickets

Essex came back from a 120-run first innings deficit, after Derbyshire had used a day and a half for their first innings at The County Ground, Derby. Derbyshire struck runs at a rate of 2.75 an over, but four batsmen still made fifties, and especially Luke Sutton took his time at the crease. His 88 took five hours, and he faced 241 deliveries. However, Derbyshire's tactic of attrition seemed to work – after making 426, all while Danish Kaneria was bowling (the Pakistani leg spinner bowled 60.1 overs, taking six for 111), Derbyshire immediately got breakthroughs with the ball. Essex were 18 for 3 before the Flower brothers – Grant and Andy – put on 60 for the fourth wicket to help close the gap. By stumps, Essex were 113 for 4 from 50 overs.

After run rates of just above 2.5 on the first two days, the third day gave the spectators nearly 400 runs while eighteen wickets fell. Graeme Welch took two wickets in consecutive deliveries in the early stages, as Essex were 128 for 6, but Ronnie Irani made a four-hour 99 and also had support from James Middlebrook (42) and Darren Gough – the latter registering 51 off just 38 deliveries. Welch finished with figures of five for 68, his second five-for of the season, as Essex finished on 306. Then, Essex' bowlers got wickets at a much more rapid rate than in the first innings, where Derbyshire had made 206 for the first four. In the second, they managed 34, as Ravinder Bopara got two wickets and Danish and Graham Napier dug out one each. Another three-hour effort from Luke Sutton and a 91-ball 74 from Jonathan Moss saw Derbyshire to stumps with a lead of 314 with eight down – Sutton still not out with 38. A further 22 runs were added on the second day, while Danish dismissed Jake Needham to complete his second five-for of the match – Sutton was left stranded on 46 not out, setting Essex 337 to win. As Alastair Cook (14), Grant Flower (11-ball duck) and Bopara (10) were dismissed in succession, Essex lost their first three wickets for 82, but William Jefferson made 83 to set them back on track, and a 177-run partnership between Andy Flower and Ronnie Irani left Essex with 33 to hit with five wickets to spare. Ronnie Irani and James Foster made it with five wickets to spare, and Derbyshire's run of matches without a win continued. (Cricinfo scorecard)

==== National League: Essex v Nottinghamshire (22 August) ====
No result; Essex (2pts), Nottinghamshire (2pts)

Essex Eagles edged closer to the National League title with two points at Chelmsford, though rain ravaged the game. Only eight overs of play were possible before the umpires called off the game, and in that time Essex lost both openers but still scored at nearly seven an over with the total at 53 for 2 – a score including six wides bowled by the Nottinghamshire Outlaws bowlers. (Cricinfo scorecard)

==== County Championship: Essex v Somerset (24–27 August) ====
Somerset (16pts) beat Essex (5pts) by five wickets

Somerset exploited Essex' declarations to take their fourth win of the Championship season despite rain curtailing play by nearly 33% at Colchester. After the first day was over with only three overs bowled and Alastair Cook dismissed for a duck, Somerset's overseas player Charl Langeveldt dug out Grant Flower on the second morning, but double-digit contributions from the rest of the batting line-up – William Jefferson top-scoring with 93 – gave Essex a relatively comfortable 220 for 5 by stumps on day two. They made their way to 400 and the five batting points before declaring, losing only one wicket while James Foster added 87 to his overnight score to end with 107 not out. When Somerset were asked to bat, André Nel whipped out two Somerset wickets with the first three balls of the game, but no Essex bowler could get any more wickets as James Hildreth scored twelve boundaries for an unbeaten 76 at the close of day three to see Somerset to 112 for 2. Overnight, the two captains agreed to a mutual forfeiture of innings, so that Essex would not have to bat again. Hence, Somerset would have to chase 289 in a day to win, while Essex would have to bowl them out. André Nel removed Michael Wood for a duck again, but Arul Suppiah added 29 at more than a run a ball, and former England Under-19 player Hildreth settled in well. He made his second unbeaten score of the match, this time worth 125, guiding Somerset past the winning target in 66.1 overs with five wickets to spare. Danish Kaneria bowled 24 of Essex' 66 overs, but to little effect, ending with one wicket for 80 runs, while Nel got William Durston for a duck to end with four wickets for the match – all ducks. (Cricinfo scorecard)

==== National League: Essex v Hampshire (28 August) ====
Essex (4pts) beat Hampshire (0pts) by 12 runs

André Nel and Danish Kaneria conceded runs at less than four runs an over to help Essex Eagles to victory over Hampshire Hawks at Chelmsford, and the four points for the win increased their lead in the National League to an unassailable 14 points and secured the National League title for Essex. After an opening stand of 70 between William Jefferson and Ronnie Irani, Hampshire got four wickets for 31 as three Essex batsmen were dismissed in single figures before James Middlebrook put on 68 with Jefferson. However, three wickets fell for three runs and the score was 172 for 7, with Jefferson caught for 88, but Hampshire could only take two more wickets in the last half-hour as contributions from Ryan ten Doeschate, Graham Napier and Kaneria propelled Essex to 222 for 9 at the end of their 45 overs. Hampshire and England fast bowler Chris Tremlett got Napier, ten Doeschate and James Middlebrook out to end with three wickets for 48. Despite John Crawley and Nic Pothas recording a first-wicket partnership of 95, Kaneria dismissed Pothas and went on to concede 26 in nine overs – well short of the required run rate at five an over, and boundaries were rare after Pothas and Crawley were dismissed. In the end, Hampshire finished on 210 for 8, 13 runs short of victory – with their overseas players Shane Watson and Andy Bichel contributing four runs off 18 deliveries, for a run rate of 1.33 an over. (Cricinfo scorecard)

=== September ===
September started with a two-day draw with Australia, before Essex beat Lancashire by 55 runs in the National League. Lancashire came back in the Championship, though, beating Essex inside three days to leave Essex 10.5 points adrift of the third-placed Yorkshire – who had a game in hand. Yorkshire drew that game, earning 12 points to increase the distance to 22.5 points, resulting in Essex' promotion chances slimming to exactly zero. Essex had to be content with a National League victory, cementing the already confirmed title with a win over Worcestershire, before a Championship draw with Worcestershire and a seven-wicket League win over Northamptonshire rounded off the season.

==== Tour Match: Essex v Australians (3–4 September) ====
Match drawn

Both sides surpassed 500 in their innings in this two-day match, which included four centuries and expensive bowling figures on either side – as Jason Gillespie was the most economical, with an analysis reading 22–3–80–0. Essex batted first at Chelmsford after winning the toss, and Will Jefferson added 140 for the first wicket with Alastair Cook before being bowled by Michael Kasprowicz. However, the second-wicket partnership was worth even more than the first. Cook slashed 33 fours and one six on his way to 214 – which would have been his highest first class score if the match had had first class status – and added 270 with Ravinder Bopara.

After 105 overs, Essex declared with the score 502 for 4, giving Australia the turn to catch up with the score. Justin Langer and Matthew Hayden added 213 for the first wicket, Hayden went on to make a 118-ball 150 before retiring, while Brad Hodge top scored with 166 from number 4, including a 161-run fifth-wicket partnership with Brad Haddin. For Essex, James Middlebrook got the best bowling figures with two for 110, including Adam Gilchrist for 8, as Australia finished the day's batting practice with the score 561 for 6. (Cricinfo scorecard)

==== National League: Essex v Lancashire (7 September) ====
Essex (4pts) beat Lancashire (0pts) by 55 runs

Dutch–South African Ryan ten Doeschate made a career-best 89 not out with five sixes as Essex Eagles made their way to 273 for 6 at Chelmsford. Sajid Mahmood was the main recipient of ten Doeschate's boundary-hitting – ending with figures of two for 67 in nine overs. England Under-19 player Tom Smith, who had taken 15 Test wickets in three U-19 matches with Sri Lanka, finished with 42 conceded runs off his five overs. When Lancashire Lightning batted, Darren Gough got the early wicket of Iain Sutcliffe, and despite scores in the 30s from Andrew Crook and Mal Loye, Lancashire lost their first four wickets for 91 runs. Andrew Symonds rebuilt with Mark Chilton, but once Symonds was bowled by Gough – who ended with four for 31 – Lancashire began to lose wickets, as the last six fell for 65. Kyle Hogg took 25 balls for his 36, lifting Lancashire to a total of 218, but they were still defeated. (Cricinfo scorecard)

==== County Championship: Essex v Lancashire (9–11 September) ====
Lancashire (20pts) beat Essex (5pts) by eight wickets

Lancashire's Indian spinner Murali Kartik got match figures of ten for 168 at The County Ground, Chelmsford, helping them to promotion in Division Two of the County Championship with two weeks to spare. Essex won the toss and chose to bat first, and were bowled out for 267, Kartik taking five and James Anderson three wickets. They struggled to 145 for 7, despite Alastair Cook's 64, but James Middlebrook and Andre Adams rescued them to two batting points in the first innings. Iain Sutcliffe and Mark Chilton added 94 for the first wicket, but Adams and Danish Kaneria fought back with two wickets each, as Lancashire ended on 139 for 4. On the second day, Andrew Symonds and Glen Chapple both made fifties, sharing a 136-run stand with sent Lancashire to 340 – before spinners Middlebrook and Danish Kaneria removed the last four wickets for no further score.

In the last session of the second day, Kartik took four wickets, and despite six double-digit scores Essex completed the day on 134 for 6, only leading by 61 runs. Sajid Mahmood then took two on the third day to finish Essex off for 227, setting Lancashire 155 to win, and a 106-run opening stand between Mark Chilton and Sutcliffe brought them to the brink. Two wickets from Kaneria did not stop them, as Law hit an unbeaten 13 to power on to an eight-wicket victory, Sutcliffe ending with 80 not out as Lancashire won by eight wickets. (Cricinfo scorecard)

==== National League: Essex v Worcestershire (18 September) ====
Essex (4pts) beat Worcestershire (0pts) by four wickets

Essex Eagles continued on their winning ways with their twelfth National League victory of the season, taking a win in the last over thanks to a 78-run stand between Grant Flower and Ravinder Bopara. However, it was Worcestershire Royals who won the toss and batted first, Stephen Moore and Vikram Solanki (coming in for Chris Gayle who retired hurt) adding 103 for the first wicket. Gayle returned when Solanki was dismissed, hitting 44, and 25 from Ben Smith helped Worcestershire to 227 for 5. Andre Adams took three wickets as Worcestershire lost four for one solitary run, but Smith added 10 with the number 11 Nadeem Malik to bring the total of 240 for 9. Essex lost captain Ronnie Irani for nine early on, but a stroke-filled half-century from Alastair Cook sent Essex to 135 for 3, and Grant Flower then hit four sixes to complete a run-a-ball 81. Despite two late wickets from Kabir Ali, Bopara saw Essex home with five deliveries to spare to finish on 46 not out. (Cricinfo scorecard)

==== County Championship: Worcestershire v Essex (21–24 September) ====
Worcestershire (11pts) drew with Essex (10pts)

A total of 19 wickets fell in four days at New Road, despite only half a day being lost to rain. Batting first, Essex made 574, with Worcestershire's Stuart Wedge taking five for 112 in his second first class game, getting Ravinder Bopara as his first wicket. Essex got two wickets in the first 40 minutes; first class debutant Jahid Ahmed got his first wicket by removing 21-year-old Daryl Mitchell for 6, and Andre Adams bowled Graeme Hick for 17, but Worcestershire's third-wicket partnership added 333 in a little over four hours, with Stephen Moore hitting 152 out of his 191 runs in boundaries. However, Worcestershire declared at the end of the third day on 424 for 3, and Essex scored 201 for one wicket in 36 overs, Alastair Cook rounding off his first season as an Essex regular with an unbeaten 117. Worcestershire were set 352 in 60 overs to win, and despite an 84-ball ton from Graeme Hick Worcestershire finished four runs short of the ten extra points a win would have given. (Cricinfo scorecard)

==== National League: Northamptonshire v Essex (25 September) ====
Essex (4pts) beat Northamptonshire (0pts) by seven wickets

Essex Eagles took their thirteenth win in sixteen matches to round off their one-day season to end with a 16-point victory overall. Their bowlers built the foundation for this victory, as all seven bowlers to be used got at least one wicket, and despite half-centuries from Australians Martin Love and Damien Wright Northamptonshire Steelbacks were bowled out for 208. Wright then took two wickets to set Essex back to 22 for 2, but Alastair Cook then followed his 117 not out against Worcestershire in the County Championship earlier on in the week. His 110-ball 94 – a career best List A score, improving his previous best by 32 runs – was part of a 168-run stand with Grant Flower, which took Essex to the brink, with 190 for 3. Flower then hit the remaining 19 runs with Ravinder Bopara, and Essex won with seven wickets and 25 balls in hand. (Cricinfo scorecard)

== Statistics ==
=== First-class cricket ===
==== Most runs ====
Qualification: 750 runs

Essex County Cricket Club in 2005 – leading batsmen by first-class runs scored
Name	Mat	Inns	NO	Runs	HS	100	50	Ave
Alastair Cook	16	28	2	1,249	195	4	5	48.03
Andy Flower	15	24	5	1,239	188	5	4	65.21
Ronnie Irani	16	23	2	1,202	103	1	10	57.23
William Jefferson	15	26	2	938	149	2	4	39.08
Ravinder Bopara	17	29	5	880	105*	1	5	36.66
James Foster	17	25	4	771	107*	1	5	36.71

==== Most wickets ====
Qualification: 30 wickets

Essex County Cricket Club in 2005 – leading bowlers by first class wickets taken
Name	Overs	Mdns	Runs	Wkts	BBI	Ave	SR	ER
Andre Adams	391.3	111	1,218	36	5/60	33.83	65.20	3.11
Danish Kaneria	394.4	86	1,069	32	6/74	33.40	74.00	2.70
James Middlebrook	467.3	97	1,417	32	5/54	44.28	87.60	3.03

=== List-A cricket ===
==== Most runs ====
Qualification: 300 runs

Essex County Cricket Club in 2005 – leading batsmen by List A runs scored
Name	Mat	Inns	NO	Runs	HS	100	50	Ave
Grant Flower	14	14	2	520	90*	0	5	43.33
Ronnie Irani	16	16	0	411	67	0	3	25.68
Andy Flower	15	15	5	389	127*	1	1	38.90
Ravinder Bopara	16	15	6	384	96*	0	2	42.66
William Jefferson	12	12	1	310	88	0	1	28.18

==== Most wickets ====
Qualification: 15 wickets

Essex County Cricket Club in 2005 – leading bowlers by List A wickets taken
Name	Overs	Mdns	Runs	Wkts	BBI	Ave	SR	ER
Darren Gough	91.4	6	346	22	4/16	15.72	25.00	3.77
James Middlebrook	117.3	4	466	20	3/30	23.30	35.20	3.96
Grant Flower	72.2	2	298	18	3/21	16.55	24.10	4.11
Danish Kaneria	79	4	278	16	3/24	17.37	29.60	3.51
