= Loughborough UCCE in 2005 =

2005 season of an English cricket team

Loughborough UCCE
2005 season

Loughborough UCCE played three first-class matches in 2005. They started their first-class season on the wrong end of a draw against Sussex. This was repeated away to Nottinghamshire in the second game, where another draw was secured, mostly thanks to the hosts choosing to use the game as batting practice.

In May they took on Worcestershire, who they dominated throughout the three days. Loughborough UCCE won comfortably by 8 wickets to win their first first-class game since gaining first-class status three years before.

== Players ==
- R M Wilkinson
- R S Clinton
- V Atri
- W M Gifford
- K R Singh
- P W Harrison
- C P Murtagh
- S Clark
- D J Wainwright
- R A G Cummins
- N J Clewley
- D R Holt

== Sussex v Loughborough UCCE (9–11 April) ==
Match drawn

The first day of this match, which was played at Hove, saw Loughborough dismissed for 237. Sussex then reached 15 for no loss at close. Sussex batted through the second day, adding 352 in the 105 overs available, after both Ian Ward and Richard Montgomerie both got centuries. Sussex were finally dismissed for 490 on the third and last day. This didn't leave them enough time to dismiss Loughborough UCCE a second time, and they were 103 for 5 at the end of the match. (Cricinfo scorecard)

== Nottinghamshire v Loughborough UCCE (13–15 April) ==
Match drawn

At Trent Bridge Loughborough UCCE won the toss and elected to bat. This allowed Nottinghamshire's Greg Smith to show off his left arm fast-medium bowling that Loughborough's inexperienced students could not cope with. Smith took 5 for 19 as Loughborough UCCE made only 164 to be bowled out before tea. After tea, Darren Bicknell and Jason Gallian scored at a steady 3 runs an over to leave Notts 67 without loss at close on the first day.

The Nottinghamshire innings continued and took up all the second day, and the batsmen got useful match practice before their Championship season started. The highlight was Anurag Singh's 131 from 176 balls with 23 fours and a six. Three other batsmen made half-centuries, including Darren Bicknell, whose 91 took up five minutes short of five hours. The pick of the bowling came from Loughborough UCCE's left-arm spinner David Wainwright. Nottinghamshire were 467 for 8 at close on the second day.

Nottinghamshire continued their innings on the third and final day, allowing Graeme Swann to make his half-century, finishing with 63 off 59 balls. They were finally all out for 532 off 130 overs. Wainwright finished on 4 for 109. This did not leave enough time for Loughborough UCCE to be dismissed a second time. They only needed to survive 47 overs. That seemed in doubt when they tumbled to 38 for 3, before the ship was steadied, and they scored 185 for 4 to claim the draw. Wicket-keeper Paul Harrison scored 54. (Cricinfo scorecard)

== Worcestershire v Loughborough UCCE (8–10 May) ==
Loughborough UCCE beat Worcestershire by 8 wickets

Loughborough UCCE had a good first day at Kidderminster, putting on 233 for the loss of 4 wickets. Loughborough's Richard Clinton, who also played thirteen first class games for Surrey this season, made 106, and put on 197 for the first wicket with Edward Foster. They then went on to dominate Worcestershire on the second day. After declaring on 304 for 6, Steven Clark took 5 for 29 as the county team was dismissed for a miserly 133 - with four batsmen, including both openers, making ducks. Only two Worcestershire players, Zander de Bruyn (81) and Jamie Pipe (23) reached double figures. Worcester made 68 for 2 following-on by stumps on the second day.

The third day saw the students wrap up a convincing victory, dismissing Worcestershire for 209 before rattling off the winning runs to finish on 41 for 2. This gave Loughborough UCCE their first first-class win since they were given first-class status three years ago, and represents the second win for a student side of the season (after Bradford/Leeds UCCE beat Surrey). (Cricinfo scorecard)
