= Oxford UCCE and Oxford University in 2005 =

Cricket results

Oxford UCCE
2005 season
- Ground(s): The Parks

Oxford UCCE started their 2005 first-class season with a weak draw against a Gloucestershire side that opted to use the game as batting practice. Their second first-class game, against Derbyshire, Oxford UCCE did well in the first innings, dismissing their visitors cheaply and building up a large lead. However, they weren't able to dismiss them a second time, in a game which was reduced through rain. In the third match, they lost by ten wickets against Lancashire, after a poor showing in their second innings.

== Players ==
- P J S Clinton
- S J Airey
- O S Anwar
- L C Parker
- D R Fox
- J P T Knappett
- S J P Moreton
- N J Woods
- P J McMahon
- A K Suman
- M K Munday
- E J Morse

== Oxford UCCE v Gloucestershire (9–11 April) ==
Match drawn

Oxford Universities Cricketing Centre of Excellence and Gloucestershire started their 2005 first-class season at the Parks in Oxford on 9 April. Gloucestershire won the toss and chose to bat. They made 305 for 9 declared off 89.2 overs, Phil Weston's 103 making him the first Gloucestershire centurion of the season. The declaration left 9 overs for Oxford to bat through until the end of the first day. They were 21 for 2 at the close.

On the second day, Oxford UCCE collapsed to 116 all out. Gloucestershire chose batting practice rather than to enforce the follow-on. At close they were 262 for 1, with Craig Spearman undefeated on 170. In the final over, which was the first one Stephen Moreton had bowled in first-class cricket, Spearman scored 6,6,6,6,4 and 6, with Spearman being dropped twice. The innings continued on the third and last day, and Gloucestershire closed on 490 for 4 declared from 101 overs. Spearman had made 216 before he retired out. There were few overs in the day left, but victory for Gloucestershire looked on the cards when they reduced Oxford UCCE to 24 for 6. Then a rearguard undefeated 64 from Knappett and 22 from Woods rescued some pride for Oxford UCCE and saw them through for the draw. (Cricinfo scorecard)

== Oxford UCCE v Derbyshire (20–22 April) ==
Match drawn

The first day at the Parks left Derbyshire at 225 for 8 at close. After recent rain in Oxford, and with a swinging ball in hand, the Oxford UCCE bowlers were commendably accurate. If 2 or 3 more catches had been taken, the scoreline would have looked even more impressive for the students.

On the second day, after Derbyshire moved to 246 all out, Luke Parker, a Warwickshire signing, scored 89 to help Oxford to 245 for 5, just one run behind Derbyshire. The third day saw Oxford UCCE consolidate their lead, and they were finally all out for 372, a lead of 126. The student bowlers were not up to the task of dismissing Derbyshire a second time in the 53 overs that remained. Indeed, they fared poorly, as Jonathan Moss scored 109 not out, with the game ending when the visitors declared on 226 for 2. (Cricinfo scorecard)

== Oxford UCCE v Lancashire (25–27 May) ==
Lancashire won by 10 wickets A second-string Lancashire side gave away 300 runs to the Oxford students, Stephen Moreton making his first first-class fifty as he top-scored with 74. Gary Keedy took four for 46 for Lancashire. Lancashire replied quickly and well, though, making 420, Andrew Crook top scoring with 88. Oxford then crawled to stumps with 24 runs off 14 overs without losing a wicket. However, the third day wasn't nearly as pleasant for Oxford, as Keedy added six for 33 to get a ten-wicket haul in the match. The students were bowled out for 151, leaving a target of 32 which was chased down by Mark Chilton and Iain Sutcliffe, and the Lancastrians won by ten wickets. (Cricinfo scorecard)

== Cambridge University v Oxford University (17 June) ==
Cambridge University won by five wickets Economical bowling and poor hitting saw Cambridge get a relatively easy target of 191 against an Oxford side including former England U-19 player Michael Munday. However, the match at Lord's was close right till the end, former Nottinghamshire bowler Tom Savill smacking 33 off 20 balls after having taken four for 28 with the ball. Munday, meanwhile, was inexplicably left to only bowl five overs — which went for 18 runs. (Cricinfo scorecard)

== Cambridge University v Oxford University (28 June-1 July) ==
Oxford University won by an innings and 213 runs Oxford UCCE recorded a thumping victory over Cambridge UCCE in the annual Varsity match between the two universities. At Fenner's, the visitors Oxford won the toss, and made exceptionally good use of the wicket. After losing two early wickets, Indian Salil Oberoi and Birmingham lad Dan Fox entered the frame. The two batted unbeaten till stumps on day 1, leading Oxford to a nearly unassailable 436 for 2, as Oberoi closed on 222 not out — 16 short of the Nawab of Pataudi senior's record — and on the morning of day two, he broke it. With 247, he'd made the highest score ever in a Varsity game — and Fox's and Oberoi's partnership of 408 for the third wicket was an Oxford all-wicket record.

By the time captain and all-rounder Paul McMahon (a former Nottinghamshire player) declared, Oxford were 610 for 5, having two and a half days to bowl out their rivals. Cambridge quickly crumbled to 21 for 3, thanks to three wickets from Amit Suman, but the fourth-wicket partnership yielded 97 runs — as it turned out, 70% of Cambridge's final score for the innings. Captain McMahon's off-spin was responsible for five Cambridge wickets, as they went from 118 for 4 to 129 for 9, amid frequent rainshowers on the third day. Rain stayed away on the fourth day, however, and after taking the final wicket three balls into the day captain McMahon wisely used his spinners — i.e. himself and former England U-19 leg-spinner Michael Munday — to get through the overs quickly. Despite 75 from Anirudh Singh, Cambridge lasted for 106 overs, but were still all out for 268 — and were comprehensively beaten. (Cricinfo scorecard)
