= Jahid Ahmed =

English former first-class cricketer (born 1986)

Personal information
- Full name: Jahid Sheikh Ahmed
- Born: 20 February 1986 (age 40); Chelmsford, Essex, England
- Height: 5 ft 11 in (1.80 m)
- Batting: Right-handed
- Bowling: Right-arm medium-fast

Domestic team information
- Years: Team
- 2005–2009: Essex
- 2010: Unicorns

Career statistics
Competition	FC	LA	T20
Matches	7	7	2
Runs scored	49	2	–
Batting average	24.50	2.00	–
100s/50s	0/0	0/0	–
Top score	16*	1*	–
Balls bowled	733	270	36
Wickets	13	10	2
Bowling average	41.69	24.80	28.00
5 wickets in innings	0	0	0
10 wickets in match	0	0	0
Best bowling	3/42	4/32	1/25
Catches/stumpings	3/–	2/–	0/–
- Source: CricketArchive, 16 May 2010

Jahid Sheikh Ahmed (Bengali: জাহিদ শেখ আহমেদ; born 20 February 1986) is an English former first-class cricketer. He played as a right-handed lower order batsman and a right-arm medium-pace bowler.

== Personal life ==
Ahmed attended St Peter's High School in Burnham-on-Crouch before attending University of East London. He is a Muslim.

== Career ==
Ahmed made his debut for Essex County Cricket Club during the 2005 season, having represented Essex Cricket Board's under-17s team since 2003. He played in one first-class match of each during the 2005 and 2006 seasons. On his debut match in List A cricket, he contributed with a match-winning 4/32 against the touring Sri Lankans.

In 2010, Ahmed was selected as one of 21 players to form the first Unicorns squad to take part in the Clydesdale Bank 40 domestic limited overs competition against the regular first-class counties.

In 2021, he alleged that he faced racism, while playing for Essex.

== See also ==
- British Bangladeshi
- List of British Bangladeshis
