= Scott Mason (cricketer) =

Australian cricketer (1976–2005)

Personal information
- Full name: Scott Robert Mason
- Born: 27 July 1976; Launceston, Tasmania, Australia
- Died: 9 April 2005 (aged 28); Hobart, Tasmania, Australia
- Batting: Left-handed
- Bowling: Right-arm off-break

Domestic team information
- Years: Team
- 1997/98–2003/04: Tasmania

Career statistics
Competition	First-class	List A
Matches	28	8
Runs scored	1,252	66
Batting average	27.21	9.42
100s/50s	2/5	0/0
Top score	174	16
Catches/stumpings	15/–	3/–
- Source: CricInfo, 4 July 2024

Scott Robert Mason (27 July 1976 – 9 April 2005) was an Australian cricketer who played first-class cricket for Tasmania. He was a left-handed batsman who averaged 27.21 with the bat in 28 first-class games and 9.42 with the bat in 8 one-day domestic games. In first-class cricket he scored 1252 runs with two centuries and five half-centuries with a highest score of 174. In one-day domestic cricket he scored just 66 runs with a highest score of 16.

In 2003–04 season he scored 126 against WA.

== Death ==
Mason was feeling sluggish during pre-season training in August 2004. He discovered he had a heart condition and underwent open heart surgery to have a new valve inserted. This meant he missed the 2004–05 season.

On 7 April 2005 Scott Mason suffered a heart-attack while batting in the nets for Tasmania. Two days later he was officially declared dead in the Royal Hobart Hospital. He was 28.

== Legacy ==
Former Tasmanian captain Jamie Cox paid tribute to Mason:

It is just tragic and ironic that a guy whose heart was metaphorically so big and a man who was so courageous that it was the thing in the end that cost him his life. A likeable guy, competitive and inspirational, and one of our true team leaders, and we missed him on the field enormously this season, undoubtedly on the field, but nowhere near as much as we will miss him now. He was such a natural leader and so much so, he may have been a future Tasmanian captain. His career was just about to take off when he was struck down last year."... He was a guy who was as tough as possible, and took his last breath with his bat in his hand, like a warrior. He touched a lot of people in his life, he was a really determined little bugger who never gave in but unfortunately this battle was too much for him.

Mason's life is commemorated by an annual Sheffield Shield game in Hobart between Tasmania and Victoria, the Scott Mason Memorial.
