= Steven Clark (cricketer) =

English cricketer (born 1982)

Steven Clark (born 17 November 1982 in Doncaster, Yorkshire) is a former English first-class cricketer.

Clark had played for the Yorkshire Cricket Board and Loughborough UCCE before signing a contract with Leicestershire for the 2006 season. He made three appearances for the county as an all-rounder. Clark spent the 2006/07 season playing for the Bentley Cricket Club in Western Australia. Between 2013 and 2016, he was First XI Captain at Hampstead Cricket Club, twice leading the club to wins in the Middlesex Premier League. In 2016, Clark played at Lord's for Marylebone Cricket Club (MCC) against Nepal with Hampstead teammate George Adair, having toured Nepal with the MCC the previous winter.
