= Luke Parker (cricketer) =

English cricketer (born 1983)

Personal information
- Born: September 27, 1983; Coventry, England
- Batting: Right-handed
- Bowling: Right-arm medium pace
- Role: Batsman

Domestic team information
- Years: Team
- Oxford UCCE
- British Universities
- Warwickshire

Luke Parker (born 27 September 1983) is an English cricketer. He is a right-handed batsman and a right-arm medium-pace bowler.

Born in Coventry, and having previously played for Oxford UCCE and British Universities, he has come through the ranks to play for Warwickshire, for whom he is soon hoping to make an impact in the side.
