= Tony Palladino (cricketer) =

English cricketer (born 1983)

Personal information
- Full name: Antonio Paul Palladino
- Born: 29 June 1983 (age 43); Tower Hamlets, London
- Height: 6 ft 0 in (1.83 m)
- Batting: Right-handed
- Bowling: Right-arm medium
- Role: Bowler

Domestic team information
- Years: Team
- 2002–2003: Essex Cricket Board
- 2003–2005: Cambridge UCCE
- 2003–2010: Essex
- 2009–2010: Suffolk
- 2009–2010: Namibia
- 2011–2020: Derbyshire
- FC debut: 12 April 2003 Cambridge UCCE v Essex
- LA debut: 12 April 2003 Essex CB v Surrey CB

Career statistics
Competition	FC	LA	T20
Matches	166	57	26
Runs scored	2,915	268	48
Batting average	15.42	10.73	6.85
100s/50s	1/8	0/0	0/0
Top score	106	31	14*
Balls bowled	27,369	2,273	490
Wickets	464	54	28
Bowling average	28.56	37.70	21.92
5 wickets in innings	17	1	0
10 wickets in match	1	0	0
Best bowling	7/53	5/49	4/21
Catches/stumpings	40/–	6/–	5/–
- Source: ESPNcricinfo, 26 September 2020

Antonio Paul Palladino (born 29 June 1983), known as Tony Palladino, is an English professional cricketer. He is a right-handed batsman and a right-arm medium-pace bowler.

He played for Essex and Derbyshire County Cricket Club between 2003 and 2020.

A popular player with colleagues and the cricket community, he was not re-engaged by Derbyshire following the end of the 2020 season when the Covid pandemic hit the world of sport quite severely. Palladino subsequently left Derbyshire by mutual agreement. He had been the county's leading wicket taker over the 2018–2019 seasons and had been the mainstay of the county bowling attack for a number of years.

Since leaving Derbyshire, he has been Professional / 1st Team Coach (Level 3 Coach) at South Wingfield Cricket Club where promotion to the Derbyshire County Division One has been achieved one year after his arrival (52 wickets @12.4 www.play-cricket.com) and coaches junior cricket at Brailsford & Ednaston Cricket Club in Derbyshire.
