= Derbyshire County Cricket Club in 2010 =

2010 season of an English cricket team

Derbyshire County Cricket Club seasons
2010 season
- Captain: Greg Smith
- County Championship: Div 2 – 9
- Clydesdale Bank 40: Group B – 4
- Friends Provident T20: North – 5
- Most runs: Chris Rogers
- Most wickets: Robin Peterson
- Most catches: Lee Goddard

Derbyshire County Cricket Club in 2010 was the cricket season when the English club Derbyshire had been playing for one hundred and thirty-nine years. They were in the second division in the County Championship, where they finished ninth. Two new competitions were introduced for the season. These were the Clydesdale Bank 40 and the Friends Provident t20. These replaced the Pro40 League, the Friends Provident Trophy and the Twenty20 competitions. Derbyshire was in Group B in the Clydesdale Bank 40 and in the North Group of the Friends Provident t20 but did not progress to the knockout stage in either competition.

== 2010 season ==
In the 2010 County Championship, Derbyshire was in Division 2 and finished in ninth position. Of their sixteen games, they won three and lost seven, the remainder being drawn. Another first class fixture against Loughborough University was abandoned. In the 2010 Clydesdale Bank 40, Derbyshire was in Group B in which they won four of their twelve matches to finish fourth in the group. In the 2010 Friends Provident t20, Derbyshire played in the North Group and won six of their sixteen matches to finish fifth in the group.

Greg Smith was captain. Chris Rogers scored most runs and Robin Peterson took most wickets

== Matches ==
=== First Class ===
List of matches
No.	Date	V	Result	Margin	Notes
1	3 April 2010	Loughborough University; County Ground, Derby	Abandoned		
2	9 April 2010	Surrey; The Oval, Kennington	Won	208 runs	CJL Rogers 200 and 140; MR Ramprakash 102
3	15 April 2010	Leicestershire; County Ground, Derby	Lost	203 runs	WA White 101; WL Madsen 109
4	21 April 2010	Glamorgan; County Ground, Derby	Won	8 wickets	GM Smith 165; GP Rees 102
5	27 April 2010	Northamptonshire; County Ground, Northampton	Drawn		CJL Rogers 141; WL Madsen 179
6	10 May 2010	Middlesex; Lord's Cricket Ground, St John's Wood	Lost	Innings and 35 runs	NJ Dexter 112; GK Berg 125
7	17 May 2010	Worcestershire; County Ground, New Road, Worcester	Lost	8 wickets	DKH Mitchell 148; AN Kervezee 130; GT Park 124
8	24 May 2010	Gloucestershire; County Ground, Derby	Lost	134 runs	CJL Rogers 115; CF Hughes 118
9	5 June 2010	Sussex; County Ground, Derby	Drawn		MW Goodwin 121; RSC Martin-Jenkins 130; LJ Wright 5–65
10	28 June 2010	Surrey; Queen's Park, Chesterfield	Lost	42 runs	WL Madsen 109 and 105; TD Groenewald 5–86
11	21 July 2010	Worcestershire; County Ground, Derby	Drawn		AN Kervezee 155
12	3 August 2010	Leicestershire; Grace Road, Leicester	Lost	10 wickets	
13	9 August 2010	Northamptonshire; Queen's Park, Chesterfield	Drawn		CF Hughes 156; GM Smith 5–54; E Chigumbura 5–92
14	18 August 2010	Sussex; Cricket Field Road Ground, Horsham	Lost	109 runs	EC Joyce 164; CD Nash 156; BC Brown 112; MW Goodwin 100
15	25 August 2010	Middlesex; County Ground, Derby	Drawn		SA Newman 126;
16	31 August 2010	Gloucestershire; County Ground, Bristol	Won	54 runs	JEC Franklin 7–14
17	13 September 2010	Glamorgan; The SWALEC Stadium, Cardiff	Drawn		GP Rees 106; DA Cosker 5–93

=== Clydesdale Bank 40 ===
List of matches
No.	Date	V	Result	Margin	Notes
1	25 April 2010	Gloucestershire; County Ground, Bristol	Lost	51 runs	JEC Franklin 133
2	3 May 2010	Essex; Highfield, Leek	Lost	5 wickets	RN ten Doeschate 109
3	7 May 2010	Northamptonshire; County Ground, Northampton	Won	5 wickets	
4	9 May 2010	Yorkshire; Headingley, Leeds	Lost	100 runs	SA Patterson 6–32
5	30 May 2010	Netherlands; County Ground, Derby	Lost	7 wickets	MG Dighton 110
6	20 July 2010	Gloucestershire; County Ground, Derby	Lost	1 run	
7	30 July 2010	Netherlands; Sportpark Thurlede, Schiedam	Won	7 wickets	
8	8 August 2010	Yorkshire; Queen's Park, Chesterfield	Lost	8 runs	JA Rudolph 105
9	22 August 2010	Essex; Castle Park Cricket Ground, Colchester	Won	85 runs	
10	24 August 2010	Middlesex; County Ground, Derby	Won	81 runs	
11	30 August 2010	Northamptonshire; County Ground, Derby	Lost	5 wickets	
12	4 September 2010	Middlesex; Lord's Cricket Ground, St John's Wood	Lost	7 wickets	

=== Friends Provident T20 ===
List of matches
No.	Date	V	Result	Margin	Notes
1	2 June 2010	Leicestershire; Grace Road, Leicester	Won	11 runs	
2	3 June 2010	Yorkshire; Headingley, Leeds	Won	65 runs	
3	9 June 2010	Warwickshire; County Ground, Derby	Lost	3 wickets	
4	11 June 2010	Nottinghamshire; Trent Bridge, Nottingham	Lost	5 wickets	WJ Durston 111
5	13 June 2010	Durham; County Ground, Derby	No result		
6	17 June 2010	Nottinghamshire; County Ground, Derby	Lost	6 wickets	
7	20 June 2010	Northamptonshire; County Ground, Northampton	Won	9 runs	
8	21 June 2010	Worcestershire; County Ground, Derby	Won	6 wickets	
9	25 June 2010	Warwickshire; Edgbaston, Birmingham	Lost	6 wickets	
10	27 June 2010	Worcestershire; County Ground, New Road, Worcester	Lost	8 wickets	
11	2 July 2010	Leicestershire; Queen's Park, Chesterfield	Lost	16 runs	
12	4 July 2010	Lancashire; Queen's Park, Chesterfield	Won	5 wickets	
13	11 July 2010	Lancashire; Old Trafford, Manchester	Won	7 runs	
14	14 July 2010	Durham; Riverside Ground, Chester-le-Street	No result		
15	16 July 2010	Northamptonshire; County Ground, Derby	Lost	43 runs	
16	18 July 2010	Yorkshire; County Ground, Derby	Lost	6 wickets	

== Statistics ==
=== Competition batting averages ===
Name	H	County Championship						Clydesdale Bank 40						Friends Provident T20					
Name	H	M	I	Runs	HS	Ave	100	M	I	Runs	HS	Ave	100	M	I	Runs	HS	Ave	100
Batsmen
PM Borrington	R	7	13	246	79*	20.50	0												
LL Bosman	R													15	14	368	94	26.28	0
WJ Durston	R	6	11	240	69	21.81	0	8	8	189	72*	31.50	0	16	15	445	111	37.08	1
WL Madsen	R	16	29	940	179	33.57	4	10	10	404	71*	50.50	0	5	4	59	29	19.66	0
DJ Redfern	L	9	15	331	85	23.64	0	4	4	86	37	21.50	0						
CJL Rogers	L	15	27	1285	200	53.54	4	9	9	336	73	37.33	0	3	3	18	13*	9.00	0
JL Sadler	L	3	4	45	16	11.25	0	5	5	135	41	33.75	0	12	11	157	39	31.40	0
All-rounders
TD Groenewald	R	13	19	216	35*	21.60	0	9	6	45	13*	15.00	0	16	3	12	8	6.00	0
CF Hughes	L	12	21	784	156	41.26	2	12	12	422	72	35.16	0	12	10	164	65	16.40	0
GT Park	R	11	19	431	124*	25.35	1	9	8	153	43	25.50	0	15	9	241	66	30.12	0
RJ Peterson	L	15	24	484	58	23.04	0	8	6	124	51	20.66	0	16	15	252	35*	19.38	0
GM Smith	R	16	27	721	165*	27.73	1	11	11	191	46	17.36	0	15	14	225	38	16.07	0
GG Wagg	R	4	7	82	37	11.71	0	5	5	137	48*	68.50	0						
Wicket-keepers
SJ Adshead	R	4	7	125	49	25.00	0	5	4	14	8	3.50	0						
T Poynton	R	4	6	88	25	14.66	0												
LJ Goddard	R	8	11	165	67	16.50	0	7	5	36	24*	9.00	0	16	9	63	22*	31.50	0
Bowlers
JL Clare	R	4	6	45	24	7.50	0	5	5	50	21*	12.50	0	6	5	53	18	13.25	0
MHA Footitt	R	9	12	69	30	7.66	0	8	2	1	1	1.00	0						
ID Hunter	R							1	1	14	14	14.00	0						
PS Jones	R	12	18	427	86	30.50	0	4	2	37	22	18.50	0	16	7	103	40	34.33	0
CK Langeveldt	R													12	2	9	5*	9.00	0
T Lungley	L	7	10	85	21	9.44	0	5	3	12	6*	12.00	0	1	0				
J Needham	R							7	4	10	5	2.50	0						
A Sheikh	R	1	2	6	6	3.00	0												

Leading first-class batsmen for Derbyshire by runs scored
Name	Mat	Inns	Runs	HS	Ave	100
CJL Rogers	15	27	1285	200	53.54	4
WL Madsen	16	29	940	179	33.57	4
CF Hughes	12	21	784	156	41.26	2
GM Smith	16	27	721	165*	27.73	1
RJ Peterson	15	24	484	58	23.04	0

As the Loughborough University match was cancelled, figures for first-class and the County Championship are the same.

Leading List A batsmen for Derbyshire by runs scored
Name	Mat	Inns	Runs	HS	Ave	100
CF Hughes	12	12	422	72	35.16	0
WL Madsen	10	10	404	71*	50.50	0
CJL Rogers	9	9	336	73	37.33	0
GM Smith	11	11	191	46	17.36	0
WJ Durston	8	8	189	72*	31.50	0

=== Competition bowling averages ===
Name	H	County Championship					Clydesdale Bank 40					Friends Provident T20				
Name	H	Balls	Runs	Wkts	Best	Ave	Balls	Runs	Wkts	Best	Ave	Balls	Runs	Wkts	Best	Ave
JL Clare	RM	417	324	11	4–42	29.45	72	72	0							
WJ Durston	R	96	76	1	1–9	76.00	57	52	1	1–2	52.00	108	139	6	2–18	23.16
MHA Footitt	R	1436	786	23	4–78	34.17	294	273	10	3–20	27.30					
TD Groenewald	RF	2483	1295	38	5–86	34.07	378	345	10	2–42	34.50	302	375	16	3–18	23.43
CF Hughes	LS	66	81	1	1–9	81.00	30	26	0							
ID Hunter	RM						30	25	0							
PS Jones	RF	1883	959	31	4–26	30.93	156	142	4	3–27	35.50	288	393	11	3–20	35.72
CK Langeveldt	RF											252	309	13	3–36	23.76
T Lungley	RM	990	630	19	3–39	33.15	222	214	7	3–41	30.57	18	34	1	1–34	34.00
WL Madsen	RO	50	68	1	1–68	68.00										
J Needham	RO						294	225	9	3–36	25.00					
GT Park	RM	501	327	9	2–20	36.33	179	199	1	1–17	199.00	168	226	8	3–11	28.25
RJ Peterson	LS	3321	1566	51	4–10	30.70	317	260	7	3–38	37.14	307	380	8	2–38	47.50
T Poynton	R	48	96	2	2–96	48.00										
DJ Redfern	LO	18	14	0												
CJL Rogers	L	6	5	0												
JL Sadler	RL						6	11	0							
A Sheikh	LF	150	152	5	3–78	30.40										
GM Smith	RM	2487	1368	42	5–54	32.57	360	344	7	2–34	49.14	235	307	13	3–19	23.61
GG Wagg	LF	462	246	10	3–31	24.60	187	160	9	3–22	17.77					

Leading first class bowlers for Derbyshire by wickets taken
Name	Balls	Runs	Wkts	BBI	Ave
RJ Peterson	3321	1566	51	4–10	30.70
GM Smith	2487	1368	42	5–54	32.57
TD Groenewald	2483	1295	38	5–86	34.07
PS Jones	1883	959	31	4–26	30.93
MHA Footitt	1436	786	23	4–78	34.17

Leading List A bowlers for Derbyshire by wickets taken
Name	Balls	Runs	Wkts	BBI	Ave
MHA Footitt	294	273	10	3–20	27.30
TD Groenewald	378	345	10	2–42	34.50
J Needham	294	225	9	3–36	25.00
GG Wagg	187	160	9	3–22	17.77

=== Wicket Keeping ===
Stephen Adshead

County Championship Catches 13, Stumping 0
Clydesdale Bank 40 Catches 6, Stumping 1

Thomas Poynton

County Championship Catches 5, Stumping 0

Lee Goddard

County Championship Catches 24, Stumping 0
Clydesdale Bank 40 Catches 1, Stumping 0
Friends Provident T20 Catches 5, Stumping 1

== See also ==
- Derbyshire County Cricket Club seasons
- 2010 English cricket season
