= Derbyshire County Cricket Club in 2011 =

2011 season of an English cricket team

Derbyshire County Cricket Club seasons
2011 season
- Captain: Luke Sutton
- County Championship: Div 2 – 5
- Clydesdale Bank 40: Group A – 3
- Friends Provident T20: North – 7
- Most runs: Wes Durston
- Most wickets: Tim Groenewald
- Most catches: Luke Sutton

Derbyshire County Cricket Club in 2011 was the cricket season when the English club Derbyshire had been playing for one hundred and forty years. There were in the second division in the County Championship, where they finished fifth. Derbyshire was in Group A in the Clydesdale Bank 40 and in the North Group of the Friends Provident t20 and did not progress to the knockout stage in either competition.

== 2011 season ==
In the 2011 County Championship, Derbyshire were in Division 2 and finished in fifth position. Of their sixteen games, they won five and lost six, the remainder being drawn. In the 2011 Clydesdale Bank 40, Derbyshire was in Group A in which they won six of their twelve matches to finish third in the group. In the 2011 Friends Provident t20, Derbyshire played in the North Group and won four of their sixteen matches to finish seventh in the group.

Luke Sutton was captain. Wes Durston scored most runs and Tim Groenewald took most wickets overall.

== Matches ==
=== First Class ===
List of matches
No.	Date	V	Result	Margin	Notes
1	8 Apr 2011	Gloucestershire; County Ground, Bristol	Lost	7 wickets	GM Smith 130; Norwell 6–46; Payne 5–76
2	14 Apr 2011	Leicestershire; County Ground, Derby	Won	Innings and 32 runs	WL Madsen 106; GM Smith 99; TD Groenewald 5–59
3	20 Apr 2011	Middlesex; County Ground, Derby	Lost	3 wickets	AP Palladino 5–39
4	27 Apr 2011	Leicestershire; Grace Road, Leicester	Drawn		Jefferson 133
5	10 May 2011	Essex; County Ground, Derby	Drawn		Bopara 119; Masters 5–71
6	24 May 2011	Kent; St Lawrence Ground, Canterbury	Drawn		WL Madsen 140; Usman Khawaja 135; Shaw 5–118
7	29 May 2011	Surrey; County Ground, Derby	Lost	7 wickets	Hughes 124; Linley 6–81; Dunn 5–56
8	27 Jun 2011	Glamorgan; The SWALEC Stadium, Cardiff	Won	6 wickets	WJ Durston 106; Allanby 5–44; JL Clare 5–50
9	11 Jul 2011	Glamorgan; County Ground, Derby	Won	186 runs	JL Clare 130; Redfern 99; Allanby 113; Wallace 104; Hughes 167; AP Palladino 5–50
10	20 Jul 2011	Northamptonshire; County Ground, Northampton	Drawn		RA Whiteley 103; Mark Turner 5–32
11	29 Jul 2011	Middlesex; Lord's Cricket Ground, St John's Wood	Lost	7 wickets	Malan 143
12	10 Aug 2011	Gloucestershire; County Ground, Derby	Won	7 wickets	MJ Guptill 143; WJ Durston 151; Gidman 6–92
13	17 Aug 2011	Northamptonshire; Queen's Park, Chesterfield	Lost	165 runs	MHA Footitt 5–53; Vaas 5–65; Middlebrook 101
14	23 Aug 2011	Essex; The Ford County Ground, Chelmsford	Drawn		
15	7 Sep 2011	Kent; County Ground, Derby	Won	101 runs	WJ Durston 118; RA Whiteley 130; Denly 199; Balcombe 6–128; AP Palladino 5–84
16	12 Sep 2011	Surrey; The Kia Oval, Kennington	Lost	Innings and 126 runs	Maynard 123; Ojha 6–42

=== Clydesdale Bank 40 ===
List of matches
No.	Date	V	Result	Margin	Notes
1	25 Apr 2011	Netherlands; County Ground, Derby	Lost	13 runs	
2	1 May 2011	Sussex; County Ground, Derby	Won	6 wickets	
3	2 May 2011	Yorkshire; Headingley, Leeds	Won	52 runs	
4	8 May 2011	Worcestershire; County Ground, New Road, Worcester	Won	6 wickets	
5	15 May 2011	Sussex; The Probiz County Ground, Hove	Lost	8 wickets	
6	17 May 2011	Netherlands; Sportpark Het Schootsveld, Deventer	Tied		
7	24 Jul 2011	Kent; County Ground, Derby	Won	31 runs	MJ Guptill 102
8	28 Jul 2011	Middlesex; Lord's Cricket Ground, St John's Wood	Lost	7 wickets	Finn 5–33
9	4 Aug 2011	Worcestershire; County Ground, Derby	Lost	23 runs	
10	14 Aug 2011	Yorkshire; Queen's Park, Chesterfield	Won	6 wickets	MJ Guptill 103
11	21 Aug 2011	Middlesex; Queen's Park, Chesterfield	Lost	34 runs	Stirling 109
12	29 Aug 2011	Kent; St Lawrence Ground, Canterbury	Won	3 wickets	

=== Friends Provident T20 ===
List of matches
No.	Date	V	Result	Margin	Notes
1	2 Jun 2011	Lancashire; County Ground, Derby	Tied		
2	3 Jun 2011	Nottinghamshire; Trent Bridge, Nottingham	Lost	38 runs	
3	10 Jun 2011	Durham; County Ground, Derby	Won	5 runs	
4	12 Jun 2011	Durham; Emirates Durham International Cricket Ground, Chester-le-Street	No Result		
5	15 Jun 2011	Worcestershire; County Ground, Derby	Lost	15 runs	
6	17 Jun 2011	Northamptonshire; County Ground, Northampton	Abandoned		
7	18 Jun 2011	Leicestershire; County Ground, Derby	Lost	5 wickets	
8	22 Jun 2011	Yorkshire; Headingley, Leeds	Won	12 runs	
9	24 Jun 2011	Worcestershire; County Ground, New Road, Worcester	Abandoned		
10	26 Jun 2011	Warwickshire; Highfield, Leek	Won	6 wickets	
11	1 Jul 2011	Nottinghamshire; County Ground, Derby	Lost	5 wickets	
12	3 Jul 2011	Lancashire; Old Trafford, Manchester	Lost	10 wickets	
13	6 Jul 2011	Warwickshire; Edgbaston, Birmingham	Won	33 runs	
14	8 Jul 2011	Leicestershire; Grace Road, Leicester	Lost	2 wickets	
15	9 Jul 2011	Northamptonshire; County Ground, Derby	Lost	7 wickets	
16	15 Jul 2011	Yorkshire; County Ground, Derby	Lost	8 wickets	

== Statistics ==
=== Competition batting averages ===
Name	H	County Championship						Clydesdale Bank 40						Friends Provident T20					
Name	H	M	I	Runs	HS	Ave	100	M	I	Runs	HS	Ave	100	M	I	Runs	HS	Ave	100
Batsmen
PM Borrington	R	2	4	114	87	28.50	0												
WJ Durston	R	16	31	1138	151	40.64	3	12	12	491	95	40.91	0	14	14	282	86	20.14	0
MJ Guptill	R	8	16	537	143	38.35	1	5	5	278	103*	69.50	2	14	14	476	79	34.00	0
Usman Khawaja	L	4	8	319	135	39.87	1	5	5	155	89*	38.75	0						
Matt Lineker	L	3	6	107	71	17.83	0	1	1	13	13	13.00	0						
WL Madsen	R	14	27	727	140	26.92	2	12	12	478	75	43.45	0	14	14	316	61*	26.33	0
DJ Redfern	L	13	25	775	99	31.00	0	1	1	0	0	0.00	0						
All-rounders
Azeem Rafiq	R	3	4	52	25*	17.33	0	5	3	30	18	30.00	0						
TD Groenewald	R	14	21	281	60*	21.61	0	9	3	15	9	15.00	0	11	3	17	8	17.00	0
CF Hughes	L	14	27	741	167	27.44	2	12	12	243	66	20.25	0	13	13	272	65	20.92	0
GT Park	R	2	3	19	14	6.33	0	9	8	82	38	16.40	0	13	13	222	50*	31.71	0
GM Smith	R	13	24	726	130	34.57	1	12	12	215	68	17.91	0	6	6	47	36	7.83	0
RA Whiteley	L	11	20	644	130*	40.25	2	7	7	106	40	17.66	0	12	11	215	40*	53.75	0
Wicket-keepers
T Poynton	R							4	3	44	40	22.00	0						
LD Sutton	R	16	26	573	56	22.92	0	8	6	25	16*	6.25	0	14	4	3	2	0.75	0
Bowlers
P Burgoyne	R							2	2	6	6*	6.00	0						
JL Clare	R	14	23	688	130	32.76	1	8	6	32	19	5.33	0	14	8	48	15	9.60	0
MHA Footitt	R	4	7	36	17	6.00	0	2	1	4	4	4.00	0	1	0				
Alex Hughes	R													1	1	11	11*		
PS Jones	R	2	4	54	27	18.00	0	7	6	49	23	12.25	0	14	5	39	24	13.00	0
Tom Knight	R	2	3	15	14	7.50	0	3	1	1	1*		0	10	1	2	2*		
J Needham	R							1	1	1	1*		0						
AP Palladino	R	14	22	241	60	14.17	0	5	3	28	18	14.00	0						
A Sheikh	R																		
Mark Turner	R	7	11	113	27*	37.66	0	2	2	2	1*	2.00	0	3	1	1	1*		

Leading first-class batsmen for Derbyshire by runs scored
Name	Mat	Inns	Runs	HS	Ave	100
WJ Durston	16	31	1138	151	40.64	3
DJ Redfern	13	25	775	99	31.00	0
CF Hughes	14	27	741	167	27.44	2
WL Madsen	14	27	727	140	26.92	2
GM Smith	13	24	726	130	34.57	1

Leading List A batsmen for Derbyshire by runs scored
Name	Mat	Inns	Runs	HS	Ave	100
WJ Durston	12	12	491	95	40.91	0
WL Madsen	12	12	478	75	43.45	0
MJ Guptill	5	5	278	103*	69.50	2
CF Hughes	12	12	243	66	20.25	0
GM Smith	12	12	215	68	17.91	0

Leading Twenty20 batsmen for Derbyshire by runs scored
Name	Mat	Inns	Runs	HS	Ave	100
MJ Guptill	14	14	476	79	34.00	0
WL Madsen	14	14	316	61*	26.33	0
WJ Durston	14	14	282	86	20.14	0
CF Hughes	13	13	272	65	20.92	0
GT Park	13	13	222	50*	31.71	0

=== Competition bowling averages ===
Name	H	County Championship					Clydesdale Bank 40					Friends Provident T20				
Name	H	Balls	Runs	Wkts	Best	Ave	Balls	Runs	Wkts	Best	Ave	Balls	Runs	Wkts	Best	Ave
Azeem Rafiq	RO	594	293	8	3–24	36.62	151	115	2	1–29	57.50					
P Burgoyne	RO						60	62	2	2–36	31.00					
JL Clare	RM	1930	1165	43	5–50	27.09	277	261	10	3–61	26.10	185	261	4	1–5	65.25
WJ Durston	RO	584	345	8	4–45	43.12	222	165	8	3–7	20.62	152	201	9	2–22	22.33
MHA Footitt	RF	575	387	15	5–53	25.80	36	72	0			12	22	0		
TD Groenewald	RF	2814	1422	48	5–59	29.62	331	299	9	4–22	33.22	206	280	8	2–18	35.00
Alex Hughes												18	24	0		
CF Hughes	LS	648	370	9	2–9	41.11	384	310	14	3–19	22.14	258	296	12	4–23	24.66
PS Jones	RF	255	148	3	3–56	49.33	282	233	11	3–38	21.18	243	340	10	2–20	34.00
Tom Knight	LS	288	143	2	2–32	71.50	144	113	5	2–27	22.60	180	201	9	3–16	22.33
J Needham							30	32	0							
AP Palladino	RF	2611	1379	52	5–39	26.51	180	155	6	4–32	25.83					
GT Park	RM	24	16	0			90	71	3	2–21	23.66					
DJ Redfern	RO	18	14	0												
GM Smith	RM	1943	991	26	4–63	38.11	378	344	10	3–39	34.40	108	119	4	2–36	29.75
Mark Turner	RF	912	647	21	5–32	30.80	66	72	2	2–42	36.00	49	78	3	3–22	26.00
Usman Khawaja	RF	6	2	0												
RA Whiteley	LM	552	385	6	1–21	64.16	48	42	1	1–26	42.00	36	46	2	1–12	23.00

Leading first class bowlers for Derbyshire by wickets taken
Name	Balls	Runs	Wkts	BBI	Ave
AP Palladino	2611	1379	52	5–39	26.51
TD Groenewald	2814	1422	48	5–59	29.62
JL Clare	1930	1165	43	5–50	27.09
GM Smith	1943	991	26	4–63	38.11
Mark Turner	912	647	21	5–32	30.80

Leading List A bowlers for Derbyshire by wickets taken
Name	Balls	Runs	Wkts	BBI	Ave
CF Hughes	384	310	14	3–19	22.14
PS Jones	282	233	11	3–38	21.18
GM Smith	378	344	10	3–39	34.40
JL Clare	277	261	10	3–61	26.10
TD Groenewald	331	299	9	4–22	33.22

Leading Twenty20 bowlers for Derbyshire by wickets taken
Name	Balls	Runs	Wkts	BBI	Ave
CF Hughes	258	296	12	4–23	24.66
PS Jones	243	340	10	2–20	34.00
WJ Durston	152	201	9	2–22	22.33
Tom Knight	180	201	9	3–16	22.33
TD Groenewald	206	280	8	2–18	35.00

=== Wicket Keeping ===
Luke Sutton

County Championship Catches 58, Stumping 2
Clydesdale Bank 40 Catches 9, Stumping 3
Friends Provident T20 Catches 3, Stumping 5

Thomas Poynton

Clydesdale Bank 40 Catches 2, Stumping 1

== See also ==
- List of Derbyshire County Cricket Club seasons
- 2011 English cricket season
