= Derbyshire County Cricket Club in 2009 =

2009 season of an English cricket team

Derbyshire County Cricket Club seasons
2009 season
- Captain: Chris Rogers
- County Championship: Div 2 - 6
- Pro40: Div 2 - 7
- Friends Provident Trophy: Group D - 3
- Twenty20 Cup.: North - 6
- Most runs: Chris Rogers
- Most wickets: Tim Groenewald
- Most catches: James Pipe

Derbyshire County Cricket Club in 2009 was the cricket season when the English club Derbyshire had been playing for one hundred and thirty-eight years. In the County Championship, they finished sixth in the second division. In the Pro40 league, they finished seventh in the second division. They were eliminated at group level in the Friends Provident Trophy and came sixth in the North section of the Twenty20 Cup.

== 2009 season ==
Derbyshire was in Division 2 of the County Championship and finished in sixth position. Of their sixteen games, they won two and lost three, the remainder being drawn. Derbyshire was in Division 2 of the NatWest Pro40 League in which they won two of their eight matches to finish seventh in the division. In the Friends Provident Trophy Derbyshire played in Group D, coming third in the table and not progressing. In the Twenty20 Cup, Derbyshire played in the North Division and won three of their ten matches to finish sixth in the division.

Chris Rogers was captain. He was also top scorer with six centuries. Tim Groenewald took most wickets overall.

== Matches ==
=== First Class ===
List of matches
No.	Date	V	Result	Margin	Notes
1	15 Apr 2009	Essex; County Ground, Chelmsford	Drawn		ID Hunter 5-46
2	22 Apr 2009	Surrey; County Ground, Derby	Won	5 wickets	Newman 124; GG Wagg 6-35; Collins 5-75
3	28 Apr 2009	Glamorgan; The SWALEC Stadium, Cardiff	Drawn		Powell 108; Dalrymple 102
4	06 Jun 2009	Gloucestershire; Queen's Park, Chesterfield	Drawn		Marshall 158; Gidman 135; CJL Rogers 104
5	11 Jun 2009	Glamorgan; County Ground, Derby	Drawn		Dalrymple 128; WW Hinds 119
6	30 Jun 2009	Leicestershire; County Ground, Derby	Drawn		ID Hunter 5-82; O'Brien 6-87
7	07 Jul 2009	Northamptonshire; County Ground, Northampton	Drawn		Peters 175; WW Hinds 148
8	12 Jul 2009	Gloucestershire; College Ground, Cheltenham	Won	185 runs	GM Smith 126; WL Madsen 170; Franklin 109
9	21 Jul 2009	Middlesex; County Ground, Derby	Drawn		Shah 129; Murtagh 7-82; GG Wagg 5-88
10	31 Jul 2009	Kent; St Lawrence Ground, Canterbury	Lost	3 wickets	CJL Rogers 107; Key 110; G Jones 100; GG Wagg 5-96
11	06 Aug 2009	Surrey; Whitgift School, Croydon	Drawn		Brown 120; Ramprakash 134; WL Madsen 108; TD Groenewald 6-50;
12	11 Aug 2009	Leicestershire; Grace Road, Leicester	Drawn		CJL Rogers 163; Naik 109
13	19 Aug 2009	Northamptonshire; Queen's Park, Chesterfield	Lost	2 wickets	TD Groenewald 6-61
14	02 Sep 2009	Kent; County Ground, Derby	Drawn		G Jones 108; CJL Rogers 208; GT Park 178; Key 141; van Jaarsveld 101; PS Jones 5-35
15	15 Sep 2009	Middlesex; Uxbridge Cricket Club Ground	Drawn		WL Madsen 167; Compton 178; CJL Rogers 112; GM Smith 5-65
16	23 Sep 2009	Essex; County Ground, Derby	Lost	5 wickets	CJL Rogers 222; Westley 132; GT Park 103; ten Doeschate 108

=== NatWest Pro40 League ===
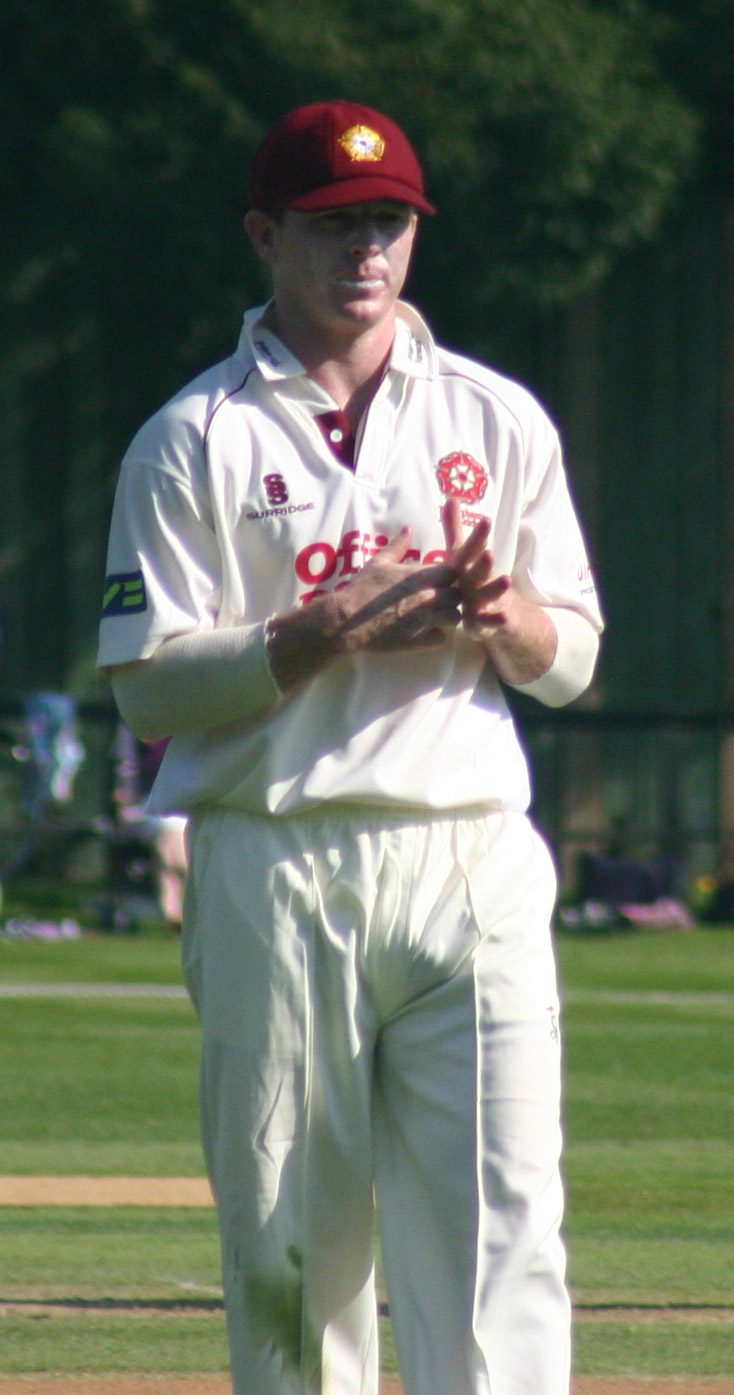
Chris Rogers Captain and top scorer

List of matches
No.	Date	V	Result	Margin	Notes
1	17 Jul 2009	Northamptonshire; County Ground, Derby	Abandoned		
2	19 Jul 2009	Lancashire; Old Trafford, Manchester	Abandoned		
3	05 Aug 2009	Surrey; Whitgift School, Croydon	Won	4 wickets	
4	23 Aug 2009	Kent; Queen's Park, Chesterfield	Lost	4 wickets	
5	06 Sep 2009	Warwickshire; Edgbaston, Birmingham	Lost	110 runs	Bell 105
6	11 Sep 2009	Leicestershire; County Ground, Derby	Won	8 wickets	CJL Rogers 111
7	13 Sep 2009	Middlesex; Uxbridge Cricket Club Ground	Lost	50 runs	Compton 107
8	27 Sep 2009	Glamorgan; County Ground, Derby	Lost	5 wickets	

=== Friends Provident Trophy ===
List of matches
No.	Date	V	Result	Margin	Notes
1	26 Apr 2009	Glamorgan; County Ground, Derby	Won	4 wickets	
2	3 May 2009	Lancashire; Old Trafford, Manchester	Lost	8 wickets	Horton 111; Chilton 101
3	4 May 2009	Essex; County Ground, Derby	Lost	6 wickets	
4	10 May 2009	Northamptonshire; County Ground, Northampton	Won	21 runs	
5	13 May 2009	Lancashire; County Ground, Derby	Lost	114 runs	du Plessis 112
6	15 May 2009	Northamptonshire; County Ground, Derby	Abandoned		
7	18 May 2009	Essex; County Ground, Chelmsford	Won	3 wickets	
8	20 May 2009	Glamorgan; The SWALEC Stadium, Cardiff	Lost	5 wickets	

=== Twenty20 Cup ===
List of matches
No.	Date	V	Result	Margin	Notes
1	26 May 2009	Durham; Riverside Ground, Chester-le-Street	Won	59 runs	
2	28 May 2009	Leicestershire; Grace Road, Leicester	Won	8 wickets	T Lungley 5-27
3	29 May 2009	Nottinghamshire; County Ground, Derby	Lost	8 wickets	
4	31 May 2009	Yorkshire; Queen's Park, Chesterfield	Lost	8 wickets	
5	02 Jun 2009	Lancashire; Old Trafford, Manchester	Lost	38 runs	
6	04 Jun 2009	Leicestershire; County Ground, Derby	Lost	14 runs	
7	23 Jun 2009	Durham; County Ground, Derby	Lost	6 wickets	
8	25 Jun 2009	Lancashire; County Ground, Derby	Lost	56 runs	
9	26 Jun 2009	Nottinghamshire; Trent Bridge, Nottingham	Lost	8 wickets	
10	28 Jun 2009	Yorkshire; Headingley, Leeds	Won	37 runs	

== Statistics ==
=== Competition batting averages ===
Name	H	County Championship						Pro40 league,						Friends Provident Trophy						Twenty20 Cup					
Name	H	M	I	Runs	HS	Ave	100	M	I	Runs	HS	Ave	100	M	I	Runs	HS	Ave	100	M	I	Runs	HS	Ave	100
Batsmen
Paul Borrington	R							1	1	25	25	25.00	0 0 0												
WW Hinds		16	26	841	148	35.04	2	3	3	15	7	5.00	0 0 0	7	7	263	95	37.57	0	10	10	299	66	42.71	0
SG Law	R	2	4	39	29	9.75	0							6	6	222	95	44.40	0	10	9	184	59	23.00	0
WL Madsen	R	9	16	809	170*	57.78	3	2	2	42	42	21.00	0												
DJ Redfern	L	14	23	668	95	30.36	0	5	4	95	32	23.75	0	7	7	130	53	18.57	0						
CJL Rogers	L	13	21	1461	222	73.05	6	5	5	287	111*	71.75	1	4	4	180	68	45.00	0	10	10	256	58	25.60	0
JL Sadler	L	3	4	71	27*	71.00	0	5	4	105	38	35.00	0							9	8	123	29*	41.00	0
SD Stubbings	L	7	11	296	83	29.60	0							3	3	83	50	27.66	0						
Dominic Telo	R													1	1	25	25	25.00	0						
All-rounders
TD Groenewald	R	9	11	194	50	19.40	0	3	2	53	31*	53.00	0	7	6	15	5*	3.00	0	9	3	8	5*	8.00	0
Chesney Hughes	L							4	3	34	27	11.33	0												
GT Park	R	16	27	1059	178*	42.36	2	6	5	128	64	25.60	0 1 0	7	6	169	43*	42.25	0	10	9	172	50	19.11	0
GM Smith	R	16	27	977	126	42.47	1	6	6	186	77	37.20	0	7	7	148	43	29.60	0	10	10	259	56	28.77	0
GG Wagg	R	14	14	273	71	21.00	0	2	2	56	35	28.00	0	7	7	85	21	21.25	0	10	9	94	62	11.75	0
RA Whiteley								3	2	17	17	8.50	0												
Wicket-keepers
FA Klokker	L	2	4	53	32*	17.66	0																		
DJ Pipe	R	14	18	493	64*	37.92	0	1	1	16	16	16.00	0	7	7	91	27	13.00	0	10	6	37	14*	18.50	0
Thomas Poynton	R							5	3	52	24	26.00	0												
Bowlers
JL Clare	R	5	5	13	6	2.60	0	2	2	56	34	56.00	0	2	1	0	0	0.00	0						
M Hayward	R	5	5	14	6	4.66	0	2	1	1	1*	0	0							4	0				
ID Hunter	R	7	7	129	47	32.25	0	1	0					4	3	15	15	7.50	0	3	0				
PS Jones	R	9	9	199	54*	33.16	0	2	2	11	11*	11.00	0												
MAK Lawson	L	6	5	75	24*	25.00	0	2	0					6	2	7	6*		0	8	1	1	1*		0
T Lungley	L	4	4	62	33	20.66	0	2	2	13	10	6.50	0							6	1	2	2*		0
J Needham	R	5	7	55	20	13.75	0	4	3	10	5	5.00	0	2	0				1	1	0				

=== Competition bowling averages ===
Name	H	County Championship					Pro40 league,					Friends Provident Trophy					Twenty20 Cup				
Name	H	Balls	Runs	Wkts	Best	Ave	Balls	Runs	Wkts	Best	Ave	Balls	Runs	Wkts	Best	Ave	Balls	Runs	Wkts	Best	Ave
JL Clare	RM	714	407	10	3-64	40.70	48	52	0			85	52	1	1-24	52.00					
TD Groenewald	RF	1640	921	34	6-50	27.08	132	116	4	3-33	29.00	327	251	8	3-33	31.37	169	219	7	2-19	31.28
M Hayward	RF	740	472	11	4-99	42.90	96	84	2	1-34	42.00						96	133	3	1-22	44.33
WW Hinds	RM	360	181	4	2-19	45.25	18	14	0								18	26	0		
Chesney Hughes							126	119	1	1-34	119.00										
ID Hunter	RM	1090	593	21	5-46	28.23	24	40	0			200	164	5	2-36	32.80	60	89	2	2-37	44.50
PS Jones		1908	970	30	5-35	32.33	84	73	2	2-37	36.50										
SG Law																	5	6	2	2-6	3.00
MAK Lawson	LL	630	333	4	2-20	83.25	66	91	1	1-64	91.00	285	220	5	2-36	44.00	126	165	6	2-20	27.50
T Lungley	RM	557	392	8	3-56	49.00	78	96	0								75	122	8	5-27	15.25
WL Madsen		108	67	0			24	18	2	2-18	9.00										
J Needham	RO	610	353	7	3-47	50.42	156	144	4	2-39	36.00	120	82	1	1-28	82.00	24	21	4	4-21	5.25
GT Park	RM	543	311	7	3-25	44.42	173	176	4	2-40	44.00	180	152	2	1-23	76.00	162	195	11	3-23	17.72
DJ Pipe		6	5	0																	
DJ Redfern	LO	192	117	2	1-26	58.50	38	39	3	2-10	13.00	116	85	2	2-30	42.50					
JL Sadler																	6	15	0		
GM Smith	RM	1982	1098	32	5-65	34.31	258	253	8	2-34	31.62	324	279	13	4-53	21.46	143	202	3	1-14	67.33
GG Wagg	LF	3129	1773	47	6-35	37.72	90	66	2	1-24	33.00	330	265	6	2-51	44.16	204	282	8	2-41	35.25
RA Whiteley							12	16	0												

=== Wicket Keeping ===
James Pipe

County Championship Catches 36, Stumping 2
Twenty20 Catches 4, Stumping 2

Thomas Poynton

PRO40 Catches 3, Stumping 1

Frederik Klokker

County Championship Catches 3

== See also ==
- Derbyshire County Cricket Club seasons
- 2009 English cricket season
