= Warwickshire County Cricket Club in 2013 =

Warwickshire County Cricket Club
2013 season
- Coach: (Scotland) Dougie Brown
- Captain: (England) Jim Troughton
- Overseas player: (New Zealand) Jeetan Patel
- County Championship: 4th (Division One)
- Yorkshire Bank 40: Group stage
- Friends Life t20: Group stage

The 2013 season was the 132nd year in the history of Warwickshire County Cricket Club and their 119th as a first-class county. In 2013, Warwickshire competed in the first division of the County Championship, Group B of the Yorkshire Bank 40 and the Midland/Wales/West Division of the Friends Life t20.

== Squad ==
The age given is for the start of Warwickshire's first match of the season, on 13 April 2013.

Batsmen
Name	Nationality	Birth date	Batting style	Bowling style	Ref
Ian Bell	England	11 April 1982 (aged 31)	Right-handed	Right arm medium	
Varun Chopra	England	21 June 1987 (aged 25)	Right-handed	Right arm off break	
Freddie Coleman	Scotland	15 December 1991 (aged 21)	Right-handed	Right arm off break	
Laurie Evans	England	12 October 1987 (aged 25)	Right-handed	Right arm medium-fast	
Sam Hain	England	16 July 1995 (aged 17)	Right-handed	Right arm off break	
Ateeq Javid	England	15 October 1991 (aged 21)	Right-handed	Right arm medium, off break	
William Porterfield	Ireland	6 September 1984 (aged 28)	Left-handed	Right arm off break	
Jonathan Trott	England	22 April 1981 (aged 31)	Right-handed	Right arm medium	
Jim Troughton (captain)	England	2 March 1979 (aged 34)	Left-handed	Slow left-arm orthodox	
Ian Westwood	England	13 July 1982 (aged 30)	Left-handed	Right arm off break	

All-rounders
Name	Nationality	Birth date	Batting style	Bowling style	Ref
Keith Barker	England	21 October 1986 (aged 26)	Left-handed	Left arm medium	
Paul Best	England	8 March 1991 (aged 22)	Left-handed	Slow left-arm orthodox	
Rikki Clarke	England	29 September 1981 (aged 31)	Right-handed	Right arm fast-medium	
Darren Maddy	England	23 May 1974 (aged 38)	Right-handed	Right arm medium	
Steffan Piolet	England	8 September 1988 (aged 24)	Right-handed	Right arm medium	
Chris Woakes	England	2 March 1989 (aged 24)	Right-handed	Right arm medium-fast	

Wicket-keepers
Name	Nationality	Birth date	Batting style	Bowling style	Ref
Tim Ambrose	England	1 December 1982 (aged 30)	Right-handed	—	

Bowlers
Name	Nationality	Birth date	Batting style	Bowling style	Ref
Tom Allin	England	27 November 1987 (aged 25)	Right-handed	Right arm medium-fast	
Recordo Gordon	England	12 October 1991 (aged 21)	Right-handed	Right arm fast-medium	
Oliver Hannon-Dalby	England	20 June 1989 (aged 23)	Left-handed	Right arm medium-fast	
Tom Milnes	England	6 October 1992 (aged 20)	Right-handed	Right arm fast-medium	
Jeetan Patel	New Zealand	7 May 1980 (aged 32)	Right-handed	Right arm off break	
Boyd Rankin	England	5 July 1984 (aged 28)	Left-handed	Right arm medium-fast	
Chris Wright	England	14 July 1985 (aged 27)	Right-handed	Right arm fast-medium	

== County Championship ==
=== Division One Table ===
Team	Pld	W	L	T	D	A	Bat	Bowl	Ded	Pts
Durham (C)	16	10	4	0	2	0	36	46	2.5	245.5
Yorkshire	16	7	2	0	7	0	49	39	0.0	221
Sussex	16	5	3	0	8	0	45	39	0.0	188
Warwickshire	16	5	2	0	9	0	37	42	0.0	186
Middlesex	16	6	5	0	5	0	32	39	0.0	182
Somerset	16	3	5	0	8	0	33	41	0.0	146
Nottinghamshire	16	2	5	0	9	0	47	40	0.0	146
Derbyshire (R)	16	3	10	0	3	0	31	34	0.0	122
Surrey (R)	16	1	6	0	9	0	36	37	0.0	116

=== Results ===
10–13 April	Derbyshire	v	Warwickshire (H)	Match drawn
Scorecard	226 (87.1 overs); Palladino 68 (110); Patel 3/37 (18 overs)		201/4 (59 overs); Chopra 76 (156); Durston 2/32 (8 overs)	Edgbaston, Birmingham; Umpires: Michael Gough and Jeremy Lloyds
Warwickshire won the toss and elected to field.; No play on Day 2 due to rain.; Points: Warwickshire 7, Derbyshire 5

17–20 April	(H) Warwickshire	v	Durham	Warwickshire won by 318 runs
Scorecard	345 (108.2 overs); Troughton 84 (173); Onions 4/86 (26.2 overs)		284 (77.2 overs); Borthwick 101 (130); Barker 3/53 (18 overs)	Edgbaston, Birmingham; Umpires: Rob Bailey and Ian Gould
Scorecard	351/8d (90.2 overs); Ambrose 105 (126); Stokes 3/70 (18 overs)		94 (55 overs); Mustard 28 (119); Wright 6/31 (16 overs)	Edgbaston, Birmingham; Umpires: Rob Bailey and Ian Gould
Durham won the toss and elected to field.; Points: Warwickshire 22, Durham 5

25–28 April	(H) Somerset	v	Warwickshire	Match drawn
Scorecard	406 (108.3 overs); Petersen 136 (187); Clarke 4/70 (17.3 overs)		158 (65.4 overs); Troughton 26 (96); Thomas 3/29 (11 overs)	County Ground, Taunton; Umpires: Nick Cook and Martin Saggers
Scorecard	266/4d (60 overs); Compton 105* (156); Woakes 2/50 (9 overs)		427/9 (144 overs); Chopra 108 (199); Leach 5/63 (44 overs)	County Ground, Taunton; Umpires: Nick Cook and Martin Saggers
Somerset won the toss and elected to bat.; Points: Somerset 11, Warwickshire 6

1–4 May	Warwickshire	v	Sussex (H)	Match drawn
Scorecard	453 (145 overs); Trott 96 (203); Jordan 4/73 (28 overs)		421/7 (145.2 overs); Wells 96 (217); Rankin 3/60 (22 overs)	County Ground, Hove; Umpires: Neil Mallender and George Sharp
Warwickshire won the toss and elected to bat.; Points: Sussex 8, Warwickshire 8

8–11 May	Middlesex	v	Warwickshire (H)	Match drawn
Scorecard	428/5d (112.4 overs); Robson 215* (307); Patel 3/99 (31 overs)		374/8 (114 overs); Clarke 66* (76); Murtagh 5/85 (26 overs)	Edgbaston, Birmingham; Umpires: Rob Bailey and Stephen Gale
Middlesex won the toss and elected to bat.; First-class debut: Tom Allin (Warwickshire); Points: Middlesex 10, Warwickshire 8

15–18 May	(H) Warwickshire	v	Yorkshire	Yorkshire won by an innings and 139 runs
Scorecard	128 (51.3 overs); Troughton 65* (132); Plunkett 5/32 (13.3 overs)		407 (123 overs); Rashid 110* (158); Patel 5/56 (24 overs)	Edgbaston, Birmingham; Umpires: Michael Gough and Trevor Jesty
Scorecard	140 (48.2 overs); Troughton 37 (88); Patterson 3/19 (11 overs)			Edgbaston, Birmingham; Umpires: Michael Gough and Trevor Jesty
Yorkshire won the toss and elected to field.; Points: Yorkshire 23, Warwickshire 2

5–8 June	Warwickshire	v	Surrey (H)	Match drawn
Scorecard	631/9d (168.4 overs); Chopra 192 (291); Roy 3/35 (5.4 overs)		274 (85.4 overs); Solanki 69 (78); Rankin 4/43 (12 overs)	Woodbridge Road, Guildford; Umpires: Martin Bodenham and Nick Cook
Scorecard			234/4 (87 overs) (f/o); Burns 85 (198); Patel 2/77 (40 overs)	Woodbridge Road, Guildford; Umpires: Martin Bodenham and Nick Cook
Warwickshire won the toss and elected to bat.; Points: Warwickshire 11, Surrey 7

12–15 June	(H) Durham	v	Warwickshire	Durham won by 11 runs
Scorecard	267 (86.5 overs); Stokes 61 (109); Barker 4/41 (19.5 overs)		209 (57 overs); Patel 53 (53); Stokes 4/49 (13 overs)	Riverside Ground, Chester-le-Street; Umpires: Nigel Cowley and Martin Saggers
Scorecard	198 (60.2 overs); Stoneman 83 (116); Rankin 4/55 (13.2 overs)		245 (63.2 overs); Patel 50 (59); Onions 5/83 (20 overs)	Riverside Ground, Chester-le-Street; Umpires: Nigel Cowley and Martin Saggers
Durham won the toss and elected to bat.; Points: Durham 21, Warwickshire 4

8–11 July	Warwickshire	v	Middlesex (H)	Warwickshire won by 5 wickets
Scorecard	486/6d (150 overs); Varun Chopra 228 (428); Corey Collymore 2/63 (22 overs)		309 (82.4 overs); Adam Voges 150 (217); Keith Barker 4/47 (15 overs)	Uxbridge Cricket Club Ground, Uxbridge; Umpires: Mark Eggleston and George Sharp
Scorecard	111/5 (40.5 overs); Tim Ambrose 47 (75); Ollie Rayner 2/33 (18 overs)		286 (84.2 overs) (f/o); Adam Voges 51 (92); Chris Woakes 3/27 (12.2 overs)	Uxbridge Cricket Club Ground, Uxbridge; Umpires: Mark Eggleston and George Sharp
Warwickshire won the toss and elected to bat.; Points: Warwickshire 22, Middlesex 4

15–18 July	(H) Warwickshire	v	Nottinghamshire	Warwickshire won by 216 runs
Scorecard	463 (154.3 overs); Laurie Evans 178 (331); Luke Fletcher 3/57 (21.3 overs)		217 (73.1 overs); James Taylor 80 (133); Jeetan Patel 4/60 (21 overs)	Edgbaston, Birmingham; Umpires: Richard Illingworth and Trevor Jesty
Scorecard	180/6d (44 overs); Chris Woakes 60 (87); Samit Patel 2/46 (11 overs)		210 (87.2 overs); Alex Hales 58 (182); Jeetan Patel 4/68 (30 overs)	Edgbaston, Birmingham; Umpires: Richard Illingworth and Trevor Jesty
Warwickshire won the toss and elected to bat.; Points: Warwickshire 22, Nottinghamshire 3

2–5 August	(H) Yorkshire	v	Warwickshire	Match drawn
Scorecard	302 (98.4 overs); Ballance 112 (196); Barker 3/61 (20.5 overs)		309 (110 overs); Evans 88 (188); Plunkett 4/74 (24 overs)	Headingley, Leeds; Umpires: Neil Bainton and Mark Benson
Scorecard	180 (71 overs); Ballance 45 (119); Woakes 5/42 (15 overs)		3/0 (2 overs); Chopra 2* (7)	Headingley, Leeds; Umpires: Neil Bainton and Mark Benson
Warwickshire won the toss and elected to field.; Points: Yorkshire 9, Warwickshire 9

20–23 August	Somerset	v	Warwickshire (H)	Match drawn
Scorecard	340 (92.1 overs); Kieswetter 148 (192); Barker 3/67 (19.1 overs)		407 (142.4 overs); Evans 138 (259); Dockrell 6/96 (43.4 overs)	Edgbaston, Birmingham; Umpires: Rob Bailey and Stephen Gale
Scorecard	255 (92.3 overs); Compton 91 (169); Patel 5/67 (36 overs)		123/3 (31 overs); Chopra 55* (86); Kirby 2/37 (9 overs)	Edgbaston, Birmingham; Umpires: Rob Bailey and Stephen Gale
Somerset won the toss and elected to bat.; Points: Warwickshire 9, Somerset 7

28–31 August	Sussex	v	Warwickshire (H)	Match drawn
Scorecard	311 (109.2 overs); Wells 65 (157); Chambers 5/68 (27.2 overs)		394 (124 overs); Evans 137 (215); Magoffin 5/87 (26 overs)	Edgbaston, Birmingham; Umpires: Steve O'Shaughnessy and Peter Willey
Scorecard	394/9d (124.5 overs); Hamilton-Brown 75 (94); Patel 3/74 (36 overs)			Edgbaston, Birmingham; Umpires: Steve O'Shaughnessy and Peter Willey
Sussex won the toss and elected to bat.; Points: Warwickshire 9, Sussex 8

3–6 September	Warwickshire	v	Nottinghamshire (H)	Match drawn
Scorecard	298 (88.2 overs); Chopra 76 (114); Fletcher 4/56 (22.2 overs)		359 (85 overs); Patel 117 (171); Chambers 4/79 (21 overs)	Trent Bridge, Nottingham; Umpires: Jeff Evans and Peter Hartley
Scorecard	271 (108.3 overs); Maddy 65 (146); Fletcher 5/52 (23.3 overs)			Trent Bridge, Nottingham; Umpires: Jeff Evans and Peter Hartley
Nottinghamshire won the toss and elected to field.; Points: Nottinghamshire 10, Warwickshire 8

17–20 September	Surrey	v	Warwickshire (H)	Warwickshire won by 6 wickets
Scorecard	400/5d (98 overs); Solanki 162 (246); Barker 3/98 (23 overs)		120/0d (22 overs); Chopra 69* (81); Amla 0/22 (5 overs)	Edgbaston, Birmingham; Umpires: Richard Kettleborough and David Millns
Scorecard	Innings forfeited		281/4 (91.4 overs); Javid 119* (272); Meaker 2/84 (20.4 overs)	Edgbaston, Birmingham; Umpires: Richard Kettleborough and David Millns
Warwickshire won the toss and elected to field.; Points: Warwickshire 17, Surrey 5

24–26 September	Warwickshire	v	Derbyshire (H)	Warwickshire won by an innings and 168 runs
Scorecard	391/9d (124 overs); Woakes 152* (273); Groenewald 4/92 (24 overs)		103 (43.2 overs); Chanderpaul 52 (100); Barker 5/55 (21 overs)	County Ground, Derby; Umpires: Neil Mallender and Tim Robinson
Scorecard			120 (29.1 overs) (f/o); Poynton 41 (43); Woakes 3/36 (8 overs)	County Ground, Derby; Umpires: Neil Mallender and Tim Robinson
Derbyshire won the toss and elected to field.; Points: Warwickshire 22, Derbyshire 2

== Yorkshire Bank 40 ==
=== Group A Table ===
Team	Pld	W	L	T	NR	Pts	NRR
Nottinghamshire Outlaws	12	9	3	0	0	18	+0.457
Northamptonshire Steelbacks	12	8	3	0	1	17	+0.393
Sussex Sharks	12	6	4	0	2	14	+0.464
Kent Spitfires	12	6	6	0	0	12	+0.229
Worcestershire Royals	12	5	7	0	0	10	+0.249
Netherlands	12	2	7	0	3	7	–1.157
Warwickshire Bears	12	2	8	0	2	6	–0.929

=== Results ===
6 May	Kent Spitfires; 239/8 (40 overs)	v	Warwickshire Bears (H); 238 (40 overs)	Kent won by 1 run
	Kent Spitfires; 239/8 (40 overs)	v	Warwickshire Bears (H); 238 (40 overs)	Edgbaston, Birmingham

12 May	(H) Warwickshire Bears	v	Sussex Sharks	Match abandoned without a ball bowled
	(H) Warwickshire Bears	v	Sussex Sharks	Edgbaston, Birmingham

23 May	(H) Warwickshire Bears; 186/7 (30/30 overs)	v	Nottinghamshire Outlaws; 133/3 (19.3/21 overs, target 133)	Nottinghamshire won by 7 wickets (D/L)
(D/N)	(H) Warwickshire Bears; 186/7 (30/30 overs)	v	Nottinghamshire Outlaws; 133/3 (19.3/21 overs, target 133)	Edgbaston, Birmingham

27 May	(H) Northamptonshire Steelbacks; 229/9 (40 overs)	v	Warwickshire Bears; 193 (37.3 overs)	Northamptonshire won by 36 runs
	(H) Northamptonshire Steelbacks; 229/9 (40 overs)	v	Warwickshire Bears; 193 (37.3 overs)	County Ground, Northampton

30 May	Warwickshire Bears; 157/7 (21/21 overs)	v	Sussex Sharks (H); 149/7 (21/21 overs)	Warwickshire won by 8 runs
(D/N)	Warwickshire Bears; 157/7 (21/21 overs)	v	Sussex Sharks (H); 149/7 (21/21 overs)	County Ground, Hove

1 June	(H) Worcestershire Royals; 210/9 (40 overs)	v	Warwickshire Bears; 201 (38.3 overs)	Worcestershire won by 9 runs
	(H) Worcestershire Royals; 210/9 (40 overs)	v	Warwickshire Bears; 201 (38.3 overs)	New Road, Worcester

16 June	Warwickshire Bears; 238/7 (40 overs)	v	Nottinghamshire Outlaws (H); 243/4 (39.1 overs)	Nottinghamshire won by 6 wickets
	Warwickshire Bears; 238/7 (40 overs)	v	Nottinghamshire Outlaws (H); 243/4 (39.1 overs)	Trent Bridge, Nottingham

21 June	(H) Netherlands	v	Warwickshire Bears	Match abandoned without a ball bowled
	(H) Netherlands	v	Warwickshire Bears	VRA Cricket Ground, Amstelveen

11 August	Netherlands; 248/7 (40 overs)	v	Warwickshire Bears (H); 243/8 (40 overs)	Netherlands won by 5 runs
	Netherlands; 248/7 (40 overs)	v	Warwickshire Bears (H); 243/8 (40 overs)	Edgbaston, Birmingham

15 August	Warwickshire Bears; 213/7 (40 overs)	v	Kent Spitfires (H); 113/4 (24.3/24.3 overs, target 121)	Warwickshire won by 7 runs (D/L)
(D/N)	Warwickshire Bears; 213/7 (40 overs)	v	Kent Spitfires (H); 113/4 (24.3/24.3 overs, target 121)	St Lawrence Ground, Canterbury

19 August	Worcestershire Royals; 291/9 (40 overs)	v	Warwickshire Bears (H); 151 (35.5 overs)	Worcestershire won by 140 runs
(D/N)	Worcestershire Royals; 291/9 (40 overs)	v	Warwickshire Bears (H); 151 (35.5 overs)	Edgbaston, Birmingham

26 August	Northamptonshire Steelbacks; 324/6 (40 overs)	v	Warwickshire Bears (H); 199 (31.1 overs)	Northamptonshire won by 125 runs
	Northamptonshire Steelbacks; 324/6 (40 overs)	v	Warwickshire Bears (H); 199 (31.1 overs)	Edgbaston, Birmingham

== Friends Life t20 ==
=== Midlands/Wales/West Table ===
Team	Pld	W	L	T	NR	Pts	NRR
Northamptonshire Steelbacks	10	7	3	0	0	14	+0.329
Somerset	10	6	4	0	0	12	+0.841
Glamorgan	10	5	5	0	0	10	–0.168
Warwickshire Bears	10	5	5	0	0	10	–0.410
Worcestershire Royals	10	4	6	0	0	8	–0.327
Gloucestershire Gladiators	10	3	7	0	0	6	–0.245

=== Results ===
3 July	Warwickshire Bears; 118 (20 overs)	v	Glamorgan (H); 121/6 (19.1 overs)	Glamorgan won by 4 wickets
	Warwickshire Bears; 118 (20 overs)	v	Glamorgan (H); 121/6 (19.1 overs)	Sophia Gardens, Cardiff

5 July	(H) Northamptonshire Steelbacks; 161/2 (20 overs)	v	Warwickshire Bears; 134/8 (20 overs)	Northamptonshire won by 27 runs
	(H) Northamptonshire Steelbacks; 161/2 (20 overs)	v	Warwickshire Bears; 134/8 (20 overs)	County Ground, Northampton

6 July	(H) Warwickshire Bears; 126/8 (20 overs)	v	Glamorgan; 132/2 (17.4 overs)	Glamorgan won by 8 wickets
	(H) Warwickshire Bears; 126/8 (20 overs)	v	Glamorgan; 132/2 (17.4 overs)	Rugby School Ground, Rugby, Warwickshire

12 July	(H) Worcestershire Royals; 188/5 (20 overs)	v	Warwickshire Bears; 189/3 (19 overs)	Warwickshire won by 7 wickets
	(H) Worcestershire Royals; 188/5 (20 overs)	v	Warwickshire Bears; 189/3 (19 overs)	New Road, Worcester

14 July	(H) Gloucestershire Gladiators; 96 (18.4 overs)	v	Warwickshire Bears; 97/4 (17.1 overs)	Warwickshire won by 6 wickets
	(H) Gloucestershire Gladiators; 96 (18.4 overs)	v	Warwickshire Bears; 97/4 (17.1 overs)	College Ground, Cheltenham

20 July	Northamptonshire Steelbacks; 111 (19.2 overs)	v	Warwickshire Bears (H); 115/7 (19.3 overs)	Warwickshire won by 3 wickets
	Northamptonshire Steelbacks; 111 (19.2 overs)	v	Warwickshire Bears (H); 115/7 (19.3 overs)	Edgbaston, Birmingham

21 July	Warwickshire Bears; 73 (17 overs)	v	Somerset (H); 78/0 (8.3 overs)	Somerset won by 10 wickets
	Warwickshire Bears; 73 (17 overs)	v	Somerset (H); 78/0 (8.3 overs)	County Ground, Taunton

24 July	Gloucestershire Gladiators; 145/7 (20 overs)	v	Warwickshire Bears (H); 149/3 (17.4 overs)	Warwickshire won by 7 wickets
	Gloucestershire Gladiators; 145/7 (20 overs)	v	Warwickshire Bears (H); 149/3 (17.4 overs)	Edgbaston, Birmingham

26 July	Worcestershire Royals; 146/8 (20 overs)	v	Warwickshire Bears (H); 149/2 (17.3 overs)	Warwickshire won by 8 wickets
	Worcestershire Royals; 146/8 (20 overs)	v	Warwickshire Bears (H); 149/2 (17.3 overs)	Edgbaston, Birmingham

30 July	Somerset; 175/5 (20 overs)	v	Warwickshire Bears (H); 165/3 (20 overs)	Somerset won by 10 runs
	Somerset; 175/5 (20 overs)	v	Warwickshire Bears (H); 165/3 (20 overs)	Edgbaston, Birmingham
