= Matt Lineker =

English cricketer

Personal information
- Full name: Matthew Steven Lineker
- Born: 22 January 1985 (age 41); Derby, Derbyshire, England
- Batting: Left-handed
- Bowling: Slow left-arm orthodox

Domestic team information
- Years: Team
- 2011–2012: Derbyshire
- First-class debut: 23 August 2011 Derbyshire v Essex
- List A debut: 29 August 2011 Derbyshire v Kent

Career statistics
Competition	FC	LA
Matches	10	6
Runs scored	326	362
Batting average	19.17	58.66
100s/50s	0/1	2/1
Top score	71	132
Balls bowled	12	-
Wickets	0	-
Bowling average	-	-
5 wickets in innings	-	-
10 wickets in match	-	-
Best bowling	-	-
Catches/stumpings	8/0	1/0
- Source: Cricinfo, 30 March 2013

Matthew Steven "Matt" Lineker (born 12 January 1985 in Derby, England) is an English cricketer, a left-handed batsman and slow left-arm orthodox bowler who played for Derbyshire; he is currently a free agent. He made his first-class debut for Derbyshire against Essex in August 2011. Lineker signed a summer contract with Derbyshire in 2010 for the 2011 season. Lineker had been a regular scorer in the Derbyshire Premier League before signing for Derbyshire.

== County career ==
Lineker made his first-class debut against Essex on 23 August 2011. He opened the Derbyshire innings along with Martin Guptill and went for a fourteen-ball duck as Derbyshire made only 132 in the innings. In the second innings he performed slightly better hitting 16 runs from 39 balls in a drawn match at Chelmsford. He made his one-day cricket debut three days later against Kent. He made 13 runs from 23 balls opening with Chesney Hughes as Derbyshire chased 209 for victory. Derbyshire won the match by 3 wickets. He was released after just one season at Derbyshire.

Since then he has played for the Unicorns side in one-day cricket, scoring his maiden century in August 2013 against Yorkshire after notching his first half-century earlier in the season against Middlesex. He followed this up immediately with another century, this time going on to make 132 against Leicestershire at Leicester.
