= Craig Park =

South African cricketer

Personal information
- Full name: Craig Mitchell Park
- Born: 1 March 1986 (age 40); Empangeni, Natal, South Africa
- Batting: Right-handed
- Bowling: Right-arm fast-medium
- Relatives: Garry Park (brother); Sean Park (brother)

Domestic team information
- Years: Team
- 2010–2012: Cambridge MCCU
- 2011–2016: Cambridgeshire
- 2011: Unicorns

Career statistics
Competition	First-class	List A
Matches	8	7
Runs scored	360	72
Batting average	36.00	14.40
100s/50s	–/4	–/–
Top score	81	38
Balls bowled	384	0
Wickets	2	–
Bowling average	147.50	–
5 wickets in innings	–	–
10 wickets in match	–	–
Best bowling	1/34	–
Catches/stumpings	7/–	1/–
- Source: Cricinfo, 25 February 2019

Craig Mitchell Park (born 1 March 1986) is a South African former first-class cricketer.

Park was born in South Africa at Empangeni, where he was educated at Grantleigh School. After completing his education at Grantleigh, he travelled to England to attend Anglia Ruskin University in Cambridge. While studying at Anglia Ruskin, Park made his debut in first-class cricket for Cambridge MCCU against Surrey at Fenner's in 2010. (Note: Cambridge UCCE/MCCU differs from Cambridge University Cricket Club in that it is open to students at Anglia Ruskin University, whereas Cambridge University Cricket Club is exclusively for students of the constituent colleges of the University of Cambridge.) He played first-class cricket for Cambridge MCCU until 2012, making eight appearances. Park scored a total of 360 runs at an average of 36.00 across his eight matches, with a high score of 81. With his right-arm fast-medium bowling, Park took 2 wickets from 64 overs bowled.

In 2011, Park was called up to the Unicorns squad for the Clydesdale Bank 40, making his List A one-day debut in the tournament against Glamorgan at Cardiff. He made six further List A appearance for the Unicorns during the tournament. He scored 72 runs across his seven one-day matches, with a high score of 38. He also made his debut in minor counties cricket for Cambridgeshire in 2011, making four appearances in the MCCA Knockout Trophy between 2011–2016, alongside four appearances in the minor counties 20-over competition in 2015.

He is currently employed by the Marylebone Cricket Club as a youth cricket administrator. His brothers, Garry and Sean have also played cricket at first-class and List A level.
