= Sean Park =

Cricketer

Personal information
- Full name: Sean Michael Park
- Born: 24 April 1980 (age 46); Umtata, Transkei, South Africa
- Batting: Right-handed
- Bowling: Right-arm medium
- Role: Wicket-keeper
- Relatives: Craig Park (brother); Garry Park (brother)

Domestic team information
- Years: Team
- 2010: Unicorns
- 2008–present: Cambridgeshire

Career statistics
Competition	List A
Matches	8
Runs scored	62
Batting average	10.33
100s/50s	–/–
Top score	21
Balls bowled	–
Wickets	–
Bowling average	–
5 wickets in innings	–
10 wickets in match	–
Best bowling	–
Catches/stumpings	2/–
- Source: Cricinfo, 24 November 2011

Sean Michael Park (born 24 April 1980) is a South African born English cricketer. Park is a right-handed batsman who bowls right-arm medium pace and who fields as a wicket-keeper. He was born at Umtata, Transkei and educated at Eshowe High School, Kwazulu-Natal.

Park made his debut for Cambridgeshire in the 2008 MCCA Knockout Trophy against Lincolnshire. In that same season he made his debut in the Minor Counties Championship against Hertfordshire. To date, he has made nine Minor Counties Championship and ten MCCA Knockout Trophy appearances. In 2010, Park signed for the Unicorns to take part in the 2010 Clydesdale Bank 40, a team formed of players without current full-time contracts with one of the regular first-class counties. He made his List A debut during the competition against Glamorgan, with Park making seven further appearances in the competition. In his eight appearances for the Unicorns, he scored a total of 62 runs at an average of 10.33, with a high score of 21.

Park was involved for England over-40s at the World Cup in South Africa in 2024.

Park now teaches at The Perse School, Cambridge as their Head of Cricket.

His brothers, Garry and Craig, both played first-class cricket.
