= Mark Turner (cricketer, born 1984) =

English cricketer (born 1984)

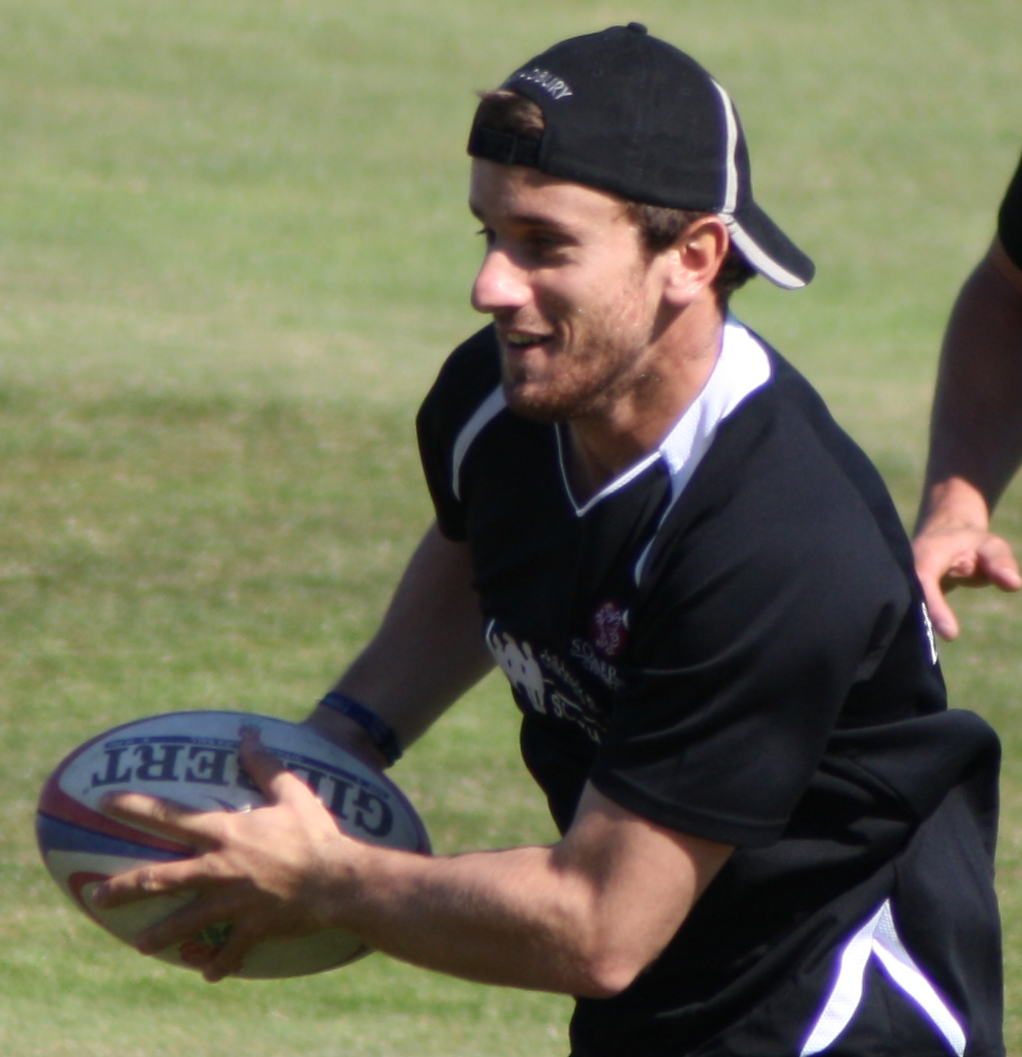

Personal information
- Full name: Mark Leif Turner
- Born: 23 October 1984 (age 42); Sunderland, Tyne and Wear, England
- Height: 5 ft 11 in (1.80 m)
- Batting: Right-handed
- Bowling: Right-arm medium-fast
- Role: Bowler

Domestic team information
- Years: Team
- 2005–2006: Durham
- 2006–2010: Somerset
- 2011–2014: Derbyshire
- 2014: → Northamptonshire (on loan)
- FC debut: 9 June 2005 Durham v Essex
- Last FC: 20 April 2014 Derbyshire v Hampshire
- LA debut: 22 April 2007 Somerset v Glamorgan
- Last LA: 14 August 2014 Northamptonshire v Lancashire

Career statistics
Competition	FC	LA	T20
Matches	30	42	55
Runs scored	330	71	32
Batting average	15.71	8.87	3.20
100s/50s	0/1	0/0	0/0
Top score	57	15*	11*
Balls bowled	4,020	1,487	977
Wickets	60	57	53
Bowling average	45.93	27.54	28.11
5 wickets in innings	1	0	0
10 wickets in match	0	0	0
Best bowling	5/32	4/36	4/35
Catches/stumpings	11/–	10/–	14/–
- Source: CricketArchive, 25 April 2016

Mark Turner (born 23 October 1984) is an English cricketer who most recently played for Derbyshire. He is a right-handed batsman and right-arm medium-fast bowler.

== Career ==
Turner played for England Under-19s in 2003 and 2004, taking 9–104 against Bangladesh at Taunton in 2004. He made his first-class debut for Durham in 2005 but made just 3 first-class appearances for them in 2005 and 2006 combined. He moved to Somerset where he acted as an understudy to the senior bowlers and made his maiden first-class fifty against Derbyshire in the 2007 season.

In September 2010, it was announced that he would join Derbyshire in 2011. At the end of the 2014 season, Turner was released by Derbyshire having spent part of the season on loan at Northamptonshire.

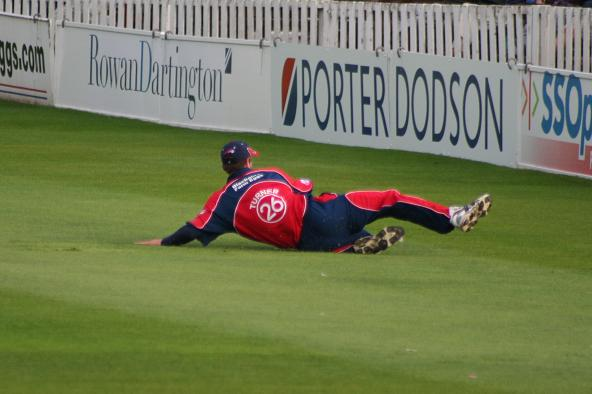
Turner slides to prevent a boundary during a Twenty20 Cup match against Gloucestershire.

He was known for his aggressive fast bowling in the Twenty20 form of the game, and being able to bowl at a similar pace off both a short and full-length run-up. He was also known to stutter his run-up, then suddenly start again – similar to a footballer stuttering in the run-up to a penalty kick. In the four day format of the game, he was a more conservative bowler, sometimes acting as a workhorse – bowling in good areas, at a constant pace, for long periods. He was also an accomplished fielder.
