= Ross Whiteley =

English cricketer (born 1988)

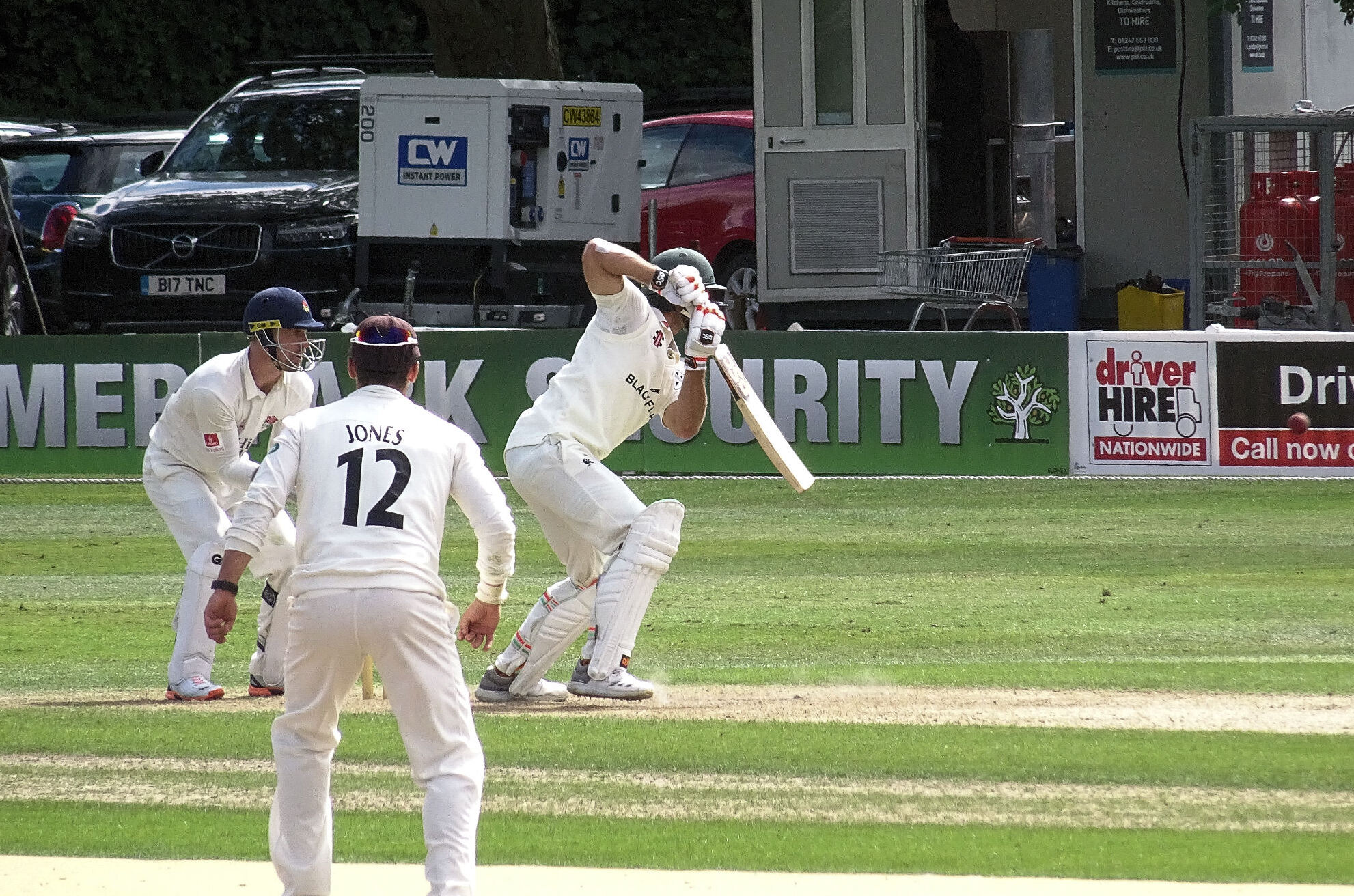

Personal information
- Full name: Ross Andrew Whiteley
- Born: 13 September 1988 (age 38); Sheffield, South Yorkshire England
- Height: 6 ft 2 in (1.88 m)
- Batting: Left-handed
- Bowling: Left-arm medium
- Role: Middle-order batter

Domestic team information
- Years: Team
- 2008–2013: Derbyshire
- 2013–2021: Worcestershire (squad no. 44)
- 2017/18: Sylhet Sixers
- 2017/18: Multan Sultans
- 2021–2022: Southern Brave
- 2022–2023: Hampshire
- 2022/23: Brisbane Heat (squad no. 44)
- 2023: Oval Invincibles
- 2024–: Derbyshire (squad no. 44)
- 2024: Welsh Fire
- 2025: Trent Rockets
- FC debut: 24 September 2008 Derbyshire v Leicestershire
- LA debut: 8 September 2008 Derbyshire v Glamorgan

Career statistics
Competition	FC	LA	T20
Matches	92	95	253
Runs scored	3,738	1,988	3,936
Batting average	27.48	26.86	23.56
100s/50s	3/22	1/12	0/7
Top score	130*	131	91*
Balls bowled	3,073	507	216
Wickets	42	14	10
Bowling average	51.02	40.21	35.80
5 wickets in innings	0	0	0
10 wickets in match	0	0	0
Best bowling	2/6	4/58	3/23
Catches/stumpings	60/–	30/–	102/–
- Source: ESPNcricinfo, 12 August 2026

Ross Andrew Whiteley (born 13 September 1988) is an English cricketer who currently plays for Derbyshire.

== Biography ==
Whiteley was born in Sheffield. He is a left-handed batsman. He played with the Derbyshire Second XI from the 2006 season, in the Second XI Championship and Trophy. His brother Adam, two years his senior, also played for Derbyshire's Second XI between 2003 and 2007. In the 2008 season, Whiteley made his List A debut in September in a Pro40 game against Glamorgan, followed shortly afterwards by his First-class debut against Leicestershire in the County Championship. He also played three Pro40 matches in the 2009 season.

In the 2012 season Whiteley hit the winning runs that promoted Derbyshire as Division 2 winners into Division 1.

On 25 July 2013, Whiteley signed for the remaining 2013 season and a further three years with Worcestershire, making his debut on 26 July 2013. Whiteley then produced a powerful innings in a 2015 T20 Blast game versus Yorkshire, his innings of 91* off 36 balls included 11 sixes.

On 13 August 2015 Whiteley signed a new four-year contract with Worcestershire, ensuring his future with them him to the summer of 2019.

On 23 July 2017, Whiteley hit six sixes in the same over during Worcestershire's match against Yorkshire in the 2017 NatWest t20 Blast.

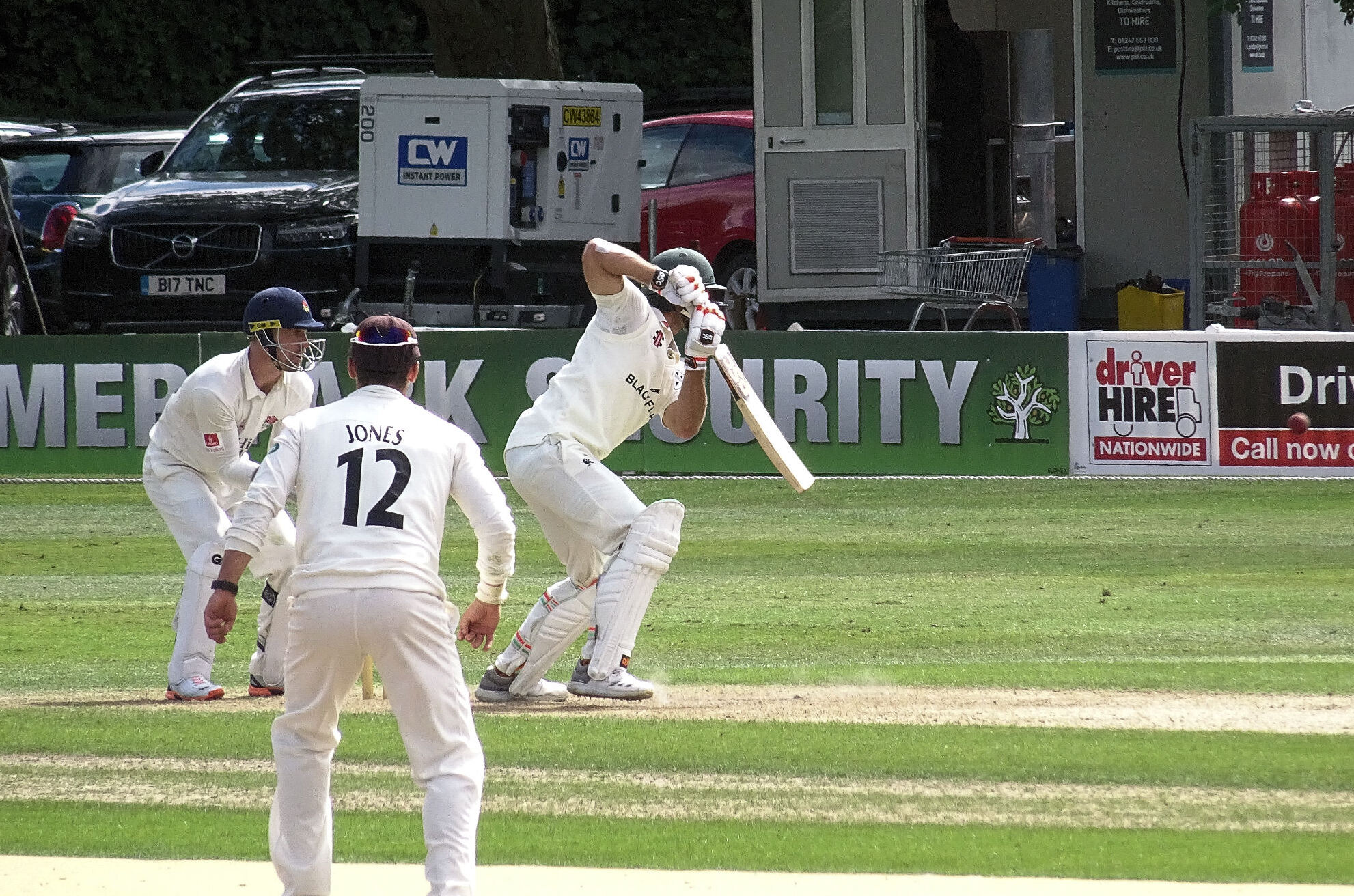
Whiteley batting for Worcestershire in 2018.

On 15 September 2018, Ross was part of the Worcestershire Rapids squad that reached Finals Day for the first time and went on to win the tournament. The Rapids defeated Lancashire Lightning in the semi-final and then beat Sussex Sharks by four wickets in the final to secure their first T20 Blast title.

On 20 September 2021, Whiteley signed for Hampshire on a three-year white-ball contract, after impressing for the Southern Brave in the ECB's inaugural Hundred tournament.

In April 2022, he was bought by the Southern Brave for the 2022 season of The Hundred.

Whiteley rejoined his first club, Derbyshire, on a two-year contract in November 2023.

On 7 October 2025 it was announced that Whiteley had triggered a one-year extension to stay at Derbyshire until the end of the 2026 season having reached the required number of appearances. He agreed a further one-year deal in September 2026.
