= Lee Goddard =

English cricketer

Lee James Goddard (born 22 October 1982 in Dewsbury, Yorkshire) is an English cricketer. He is a right-handed batsman and a wicket-keeper. He has played for Loughborough UCCE, Derbyshire, the Yorkshire Cricket Board and Durham.

He debuted for Derbyshire against his home county in the Second XI Championship in 2003; he has appeared consistently in the competition ever since. Goddard made his County Championship debut in September 2004, but did not appear again in the competition for two more years, instead concentrating on the Second XI. He has appeared in the Second XI Trophy since 2003, the year that Derbyshire narrowly missed getting through to the final.

On his championship debut for Derbyshire against Hampshire, Goddard took five catches in his first innings. Goddard holds the Durham record for the fastest half-century, reaching 50 in 32 balls versus Sri Lanka A on 10 August 2007. This mark was one ball faster than the previous record shared by Ian Botham, Martin Speight and Phil Mustard.

He joined Northumberland in 2012.

Lee now works in the healthcare technology industry.
