= John Sadler (cricketer) =

English cricketer and coach

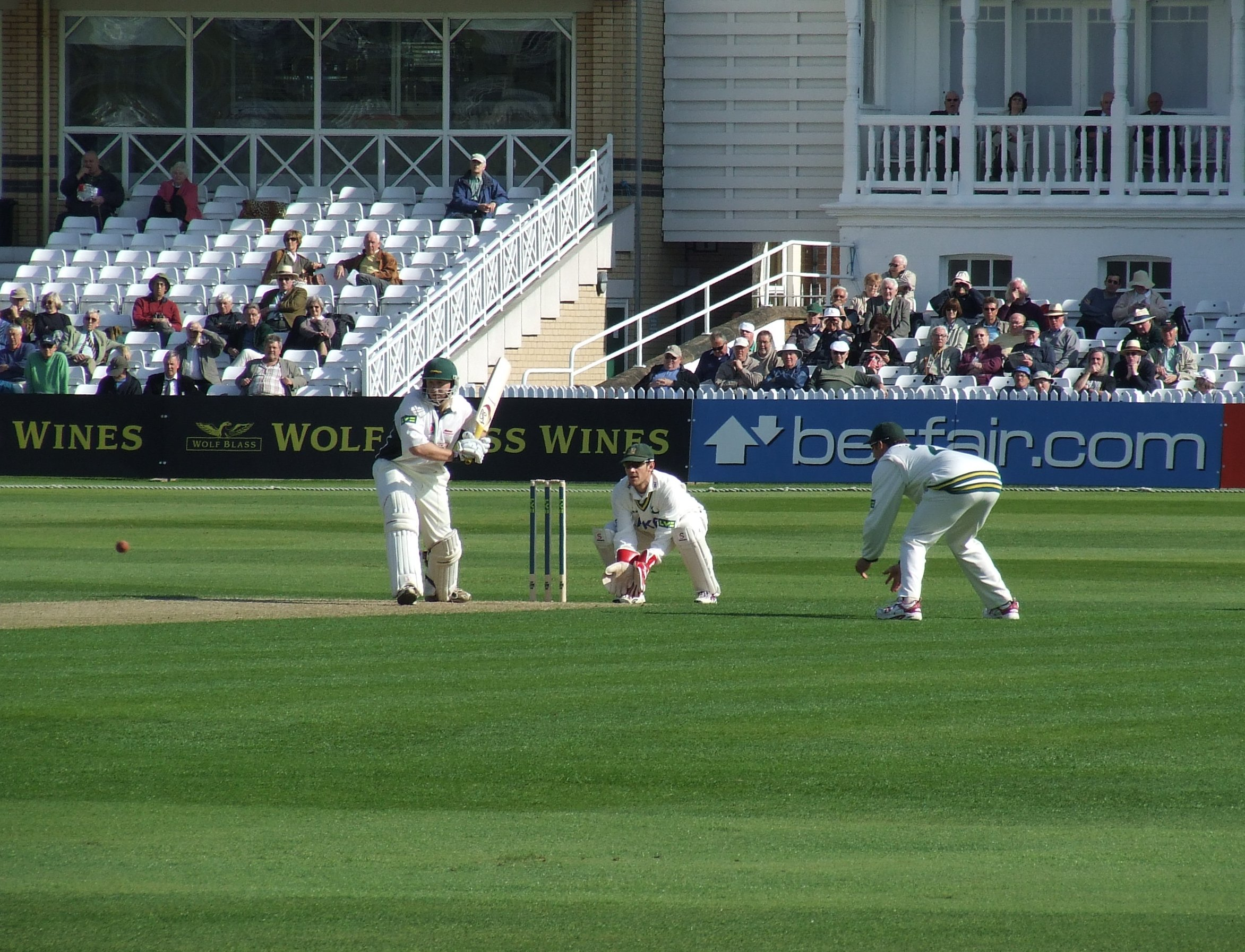
- John Sadler batting for Leicestershire

Personal information
- Full name: John Leonard Sadler
- Born: 19 November 1981 (age 44); Dewsbury, West Yorkshire, England
- Nickname: Sads
- Height: 5 ft 11 in (1.80 m)
- Batting: Left-handed
- Bowling: Right-arm leg break

Domestic team information
- Years: Team
- 1999–2002: Yorkshire
- 2003–2007: Leicestershire
- 2008–2010: Derbyshire

Career statistics
Competition	FC	LA	T20
Matches	66	93	64
Runs scored	3,047	1,956	785
Batting average	31.73	27.16	21.21
100s/50s	3/16	1/6	0/1
Top score	145	113*	73
Balls bowled	231	54	30
Wickets	3	1	0
Bowling average	83.33	48.00	–
5 wickets in innings	0	0	–
10 wickets in match	0	0	–
Best bowling	1/5	1/33	–
Catches/stumpings	46/–	14/–	20/–
- Source: Cricinfo.com, 23 September 2021

John Leonard Sadler (born 19 November 1981) is an English cricketer and cricket coach. As a player, Sadler played county cricket for Yorkshire, Leicestershire and Derbyshire, and also represented the Yorkshire Cricket Board.

Sadler joined the Derbyshire coaching staff in January 2014 and took over as head coach on an interim basis in June 2016, following the departure of Graeme Welch. The club later confirmed Sadler would remain in charge for the rest of the season, with the possibility of him retaining the role on a permanent basis.

After a spell on the Leicestershire coaching staff, he joined Northamptonshire for the 2020 season. He succeeded David Ripley as head coach in September 2021. He left the club in September 2024. Sadler was hired by Yorkshire as a batting coach in November 2024.

He is a graduate of Manchester Metropolitan University's Masters of Sport Directorship programme.
