= Mark Footitt =

English cricketer

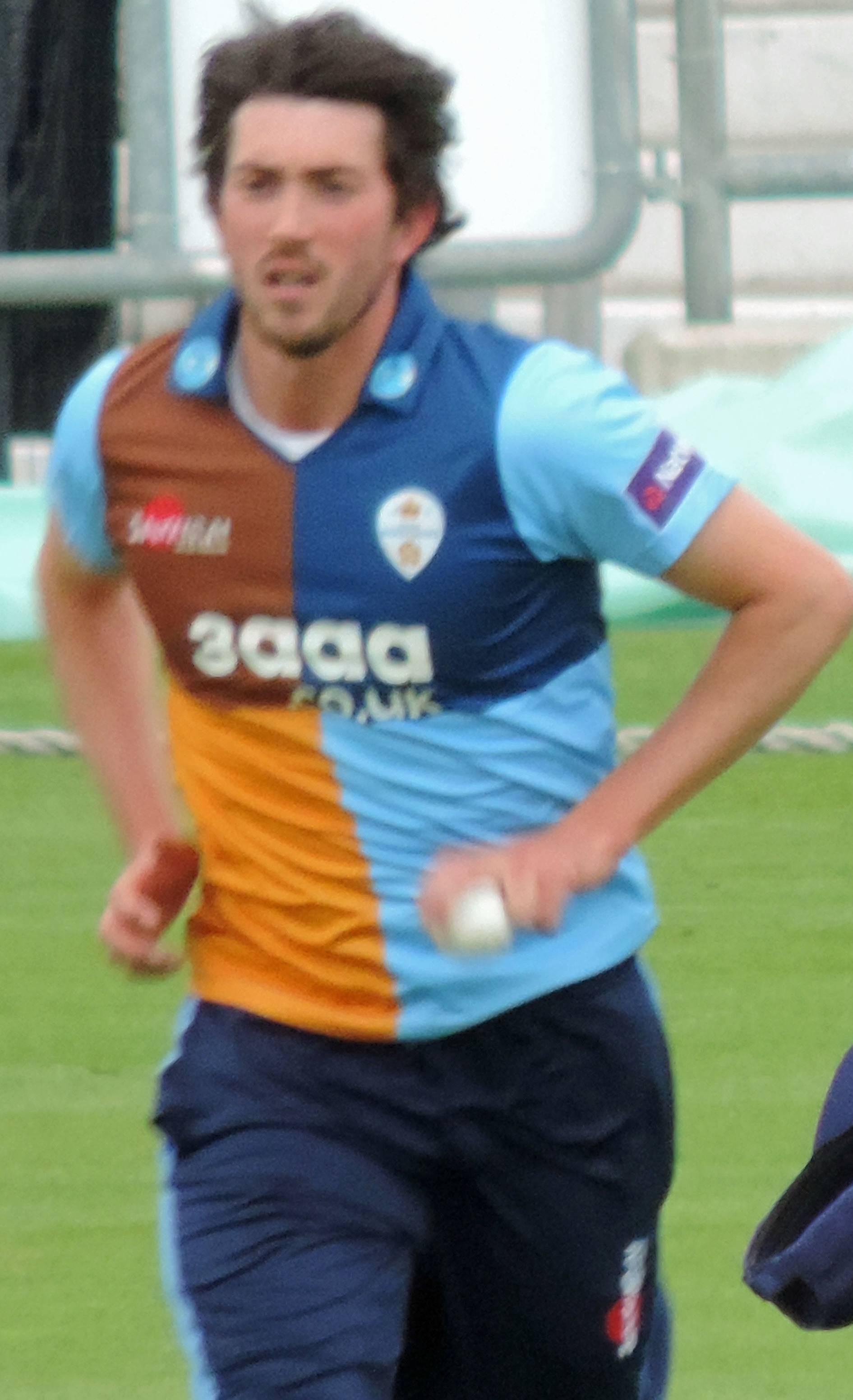
- Footitt bowling for Derbyshire in 2014

Personal information
- Full name: Mark Harold Alan Footitt
- Born: 25 November 1985 (age 40); Nottingham, Nottinghamshire, England
- Height: 6 ft 2 in (1.88 m)
- Batting: Right-handed
- Bowling: Left-arm fast-medium
- Role: Bowler

Domestic team information
- Years: Team
- 2005–2009: Nottinghamshire
- 2009–2015: Derbyshire (squad no. 4)
- 2015–2017: Surrey
- 2017–2019: Nottinghamshire
- 2018: → Derbyshire (loan)

Career statistics
Competition	FC	LA	T20
Matches	96	36	14
Runs scored	678	28	2
Batting average	7.97	4.66	2.00
100s/50s	0/0	0/0	0/0
Top score	34	11*	2*
Balls bowled	15,579	1,331	240
Wickets	352	47	12
Bowling average	26.21	29.51	35.91
5 wickets in innings	21	2	0
10 wickets in match	1	0	0
Best bowling	7/62	5/28	3/22
Catches/stumpings	26/–	6/–	1/–
- Source: Cricinfo, 28 September 2018

Mark Harold Alan Footitt (born 25 November 1985) is an English cricketer. He is a right-handed batsman and a left arm fast bowler who has played for Nottinghamshire, Derbyshire, Surrey and Lincolnshire.

== Biography ==
Born in Nottingham, Footitt was initially spotted by Nottinghamshire as a 16-year-old, and impressed judges with his raw pace. Subsequently, coached by Chris Tolley, and mentored by Greg Smith and Ryan Sidebottom, on his first-class debut the seamer took 4/45 against Glamorgan and shared a 101 tenth-wicket partnership with Chris Read.

This was followed by a call-up to the England Under-19 squad for the series against Sri Lanka, but after making just nine first-class appearances for Nottinghamshire, he was released in August 2009 and signed by Derbyshire in November 2009.

In 2015 Footitt was part of the squad for the English cricket team in South Africa in 2015–16 but did not play. On 1 August 2015, following the injury to James Anderson in the third test at Edgbaston, he was called up to the England 14-man 2015 Ashes squad, alongside Liam Plunkett.

After turning down an extension to his Derbyshire contract, Footitt signed for Surrey in October 2015.

In July 2017, Footitt was released from his contract with Surrey, and he returned to his birthplace and former team Nottinghamshire, signing a two-and-a-half-year contract. In May 2018, he rejoined Derbyshire on a 28-day loan. In July 2019, Footitt was released by Nottinghamshire having struggled to make an impact in his second stint at the club.
