= Chris Rogers (cricketer) =

Australian cricketer

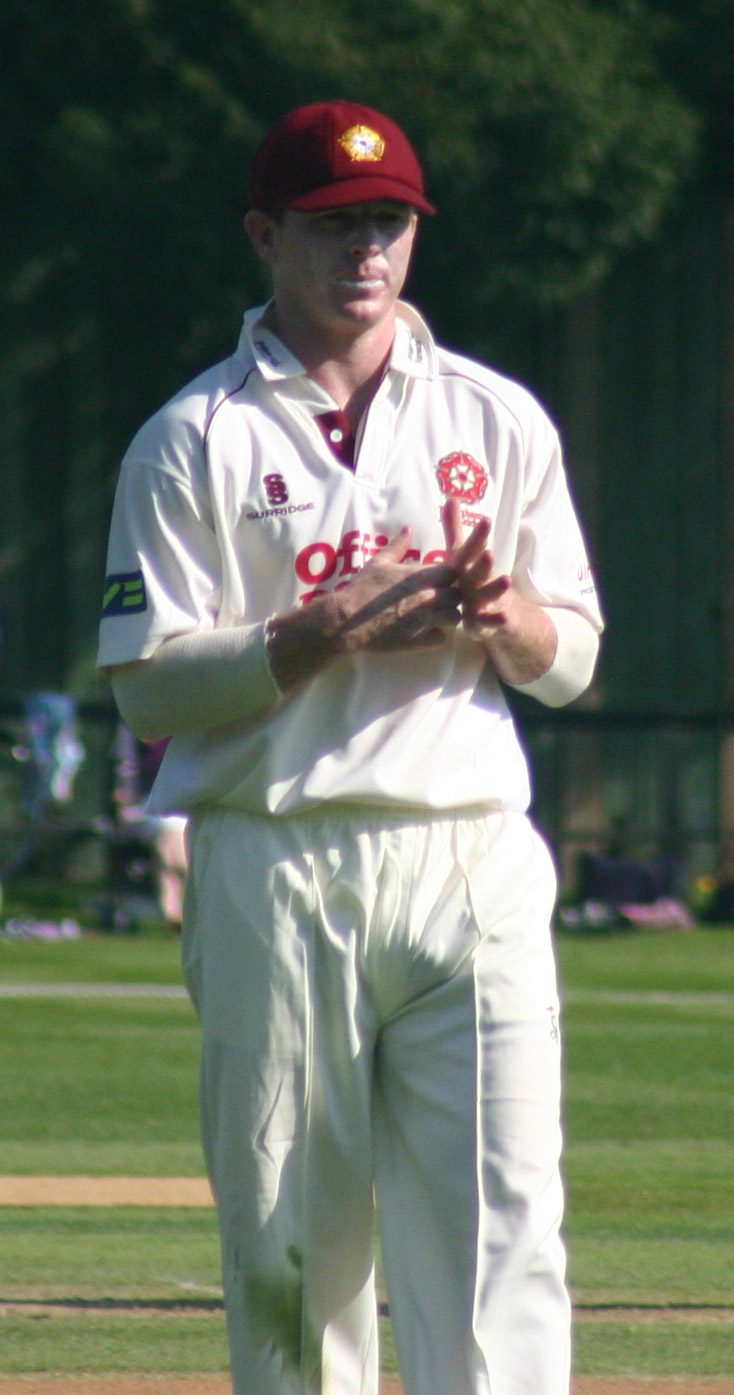

Personal information
- Full name: Christopher John Llewellyn Rogers
- Born: 31 August 1977 (age 49); St George, New South Wales, Australia
- Nickname: Bucky
- Height: 177 cm (5 ft 10 in)
- Batting: Left-handed
- Bowling: Leg-break
- Role: Batsman

International information
- National side: Australia (2008–2015)
- Test debut (cap 399): 16 January 2008 v India
- Last Test: 20 August 2015 v England

Domestic team information
- Years: Team
- 1998–2008: Western Australia
- 2003: Shropshire
- 2004, 2008–2010: Derbyshire
- 2005: Leicestershire
- 2005: Wiltshire
- 2006–2007: Northamptonshire
- 2008–2015: Victoria
- 2011–2014: Middlesex
- 2016: Somerset

Career statistics
| Competition | Test | FC | LA | T20 |
|---|---|---|---|---|
| Matches | 25 | 313 | 167 | 43 |
| Runs scored | 2,015 | 25,470 | 5,346 | 627 |
| Batting average | 42.87 | 49.55 | 36.86 | 17.41 |
| 100s/50s | 5/14 | 76/122 | 5/36 | 0/3 |
| Top score | 173 | 319 | 140 | 58 |
| Balls bowled | – | 248 | 24 | – |
| Wickets | – | 1 | 2 | – |
| Bowling average | – | 137.00 | 13.00 | – |
| 5 wickets in innings | – | 0 | 0 | – |
| 10 wickets in match | – | 0 | 0 | – |
| Best bowling | – | 1/16 | 2/22 | – |
| Catches/stumpings | 15/– | 244/– | 74/– | 22/– |
- Source: ESPNcricinfo, 22 September 2016

Christopher John Llewellyn Rogers (born 31 August 1977) is a former Australian cricketer who played for the Australian national team. Rogers is a left-handed opening batsman. He spent ten years playing for Western Australia, before moving to play for Victoria in 2008. He played county cricket in England for ten years representing five first-class teams: Derbyshire, Leicestershire, Northamptonshire, Middlesex and Somerset. Rogers holds the record for most half centuries in consecutive innings.

Despite being colour blind and short sighted, he maintained a first-class average of nearly 50, yet he did not play for the Australia national cricket team until the age of 30, when he was selected for a single Test match in 2008. He was recalled to the Australia national team for the 2013 Ashes series, aged 35, and over the following two years played a further 24 Tests opening the batting for Australia before retiring after the 2015 Ashes series.

== Early life ==
Born in St George, Sydney, Rogers' father, John Rogers played for New South Wales between 1969 and 1970. He is also a cousin of Australian chess grandmaster Ian Rogers.

He attended school at Wesley College in South Perth.

Rogers made one Youth Test match appearance, against New Zealand in 1996. Rogers' batting talent had led some to anoint him as the next Australian opener, replacing Justin Langer.

== Domestic career ==
He first came to England in 1996 to play in the Devon Cricket League for North Devon CC under the watchful eye of former Gloucestershire player and Test match umpire David Shepherd. He came back the following year to score a league record aggregate of 1,273 runs but could not save the Instow Club from relegation.

In 2002 he played for Exeter, also in the Devon League, and in 2003 he returned to England once again to play for Wellington CC in the Shropshire League The welter of runs he contributed saw them win the Birmingham premier league after gaining promotion from the Furrow's Shropshire League in 2002 to the Birmingham League where they were again promoted. He was unable to play Minor Counties cricket but did make one appearance for Shropshire in the Nat West Trophy where overseas players were allowed, but made a duck in his only game.

He made his first trip into English First Class cricket playing for Derbyshire in 2004, where despite suffering from a shoulder injury, played well. He moved to Leicestershire in the second half of the 2005 season, where he averaged over 70, and scored one double-century against the touring Australians. In 2006 he moved to Northamptonshire and immediately made his mark with fifty fours, two sixes, and a final score of 319 from 417 balls against Gloucestershire.

In October 2006 he and Marcus North put on a record domestic third wicket partnership of 459, Western Australia v Victoria, at the WACA. Rogers' score of 279 was the second highest ever by a West Australian, behind the 355 not out that Geoff Marsh scored at the same ground in December 1989. On 5 February 2007 Rogers was awarded the 'State Cricket Player of the Year' prize at the Allan Border Medal presentation.

He returned to Derbyshire for the 2008 season, playing as their overseas player when Mahela Jayawardene declared himself unavailable due to his commitments with Sri Lanka and the Indian Premier League, and has since become the temporary captain after the resignation of Rikki Clarke. Despite being both short-sighted and colourblind (a fact that was said to put him at a bigger disadvantage when using the pink ball for the first day-night test against New Zealand at the Adelaide Oval), Rogers has proven himself to be a sharp player both at and away from the crease. Rogers has also played for Shropshire, representing them during one match of the C&G Trophy. In 2008, he walked out on the Western Warriors, reportedly over his status as a fringe-player in the state's one-day team, and joined Victoria for the 2008/2009 season.

In 2008, Rogers hit 248 not out, carrying his bat for Derbyshire against Warwickshire. The score is the third-highest single-innings total in a first-class match by a Derbyshire player, and the highest score for 62 years. The innings meant Rogers had registered a double century for all four of the first-class domestic teams that he had represented.

In 2010, after relinquishing the Derbyshire captaincy to Greg Smith, Rogers joined Middlesex for the 2011 season, and was appointed captain of the first-class County Championship team in 2014.

In 2016 he joined Somerset, being appointed captain of the Championship team on his arrival. Rogers retired from first-class cricket at the end of the 2016 season; in his final match for Somerset he made twin hundreds in their 325-run victory over Nottinghamshire.

== International career ==
In May 2007, Rogers was awarded his first national contract with Cricket Australia. On 13 January 2008, he was added to the Australia Test squad as a cover for the injured Matthew Hayden, who had torn a hamstring, and he made his Test debut in the third Test against India at the WACA Ground on 16 January, but the Baggy Green had to be replaced a day later because Rogers' cap was too small, and he unsuccessfully tried to make it bigger to alleviate headaches caused by fielding all day in the scorching heat. Australia were chasing a world-record 17th consecutive Test victory, but found the going difficult. Rogers scored four runs in the first innings of 212 and 15 in the second innings as Australia unsuccessfully chased a target of over 400. His national contract was subsequently terminated in April 2008. Rogers commented that he "didn't see it coming, I'll have to accept it and try to get back in."

On 24 April 2013 and at age 35, Rogers was named in the 16-man Australian Test squad for the 2013 Ashes tour in England, more than five years after his previous Test. He opened the batting throughout the series, partnering initially with Shane Watson and later with David Warner, and made 367 runs at 40.77 for the series to be Australia's third-highest scorer. Rogers scored his maiden Test century in the first innings of the fourth Test, in difficult seaming conditions at the Riverside International Cricket Ground, Durham.

Following his success in England, Rogers held his place as an opening batsman for the next two years. In the return Ashes series in the 2013/14 summer, Rogers scored 463 runs at 46.30 to again be Australia's third-highest scorer. He scored his second Test century, and his first on Australian soil, in Australia's successful fourth-innings run-chase in the Boxing Day Test at the Melbourne Cricket Ground, and he backed that up with his third Test century in the second innings of the New Year's Test at the Sydney Cricket Ground with a score of 119. He then scored a rearguard century of 107 against South Africa in the second innings of the second Test in Port Elizabeth in February 2014, which was his only score above 50 in the series where he averaged 30.16. A two-Test series in the UAE against Pakistan in late 2014 was the leanest of Rogers' career, managing only 88 runs at 22.00.

Rogers returned to form during the 2014/15 summer, scoring 417 runs at 52.12 in the four-Test home series against India. He failed to score a century in the series, but managed consecutive half-centuries over his last six innings. He toured with Australia in its 2015 tour of the West Indies, but missed both matches with concussion after being struck in the head during a net session.

Rogers returned from his concussion the following month for the 2015 Ashes series in England, which he had announced before the tour would be his last before retiring from international cricket. He extended his sequence of consecutive Test half-centuries to a record-equalling seven innings in the first Test at Cardiff, before being dismissed for ten in the second innings. He batted through the entire first day on his way to the highest score of his Test career (173) in the first innings of the second Test at Lord's, and made an unbeaten 49 before retiring hurt in the second innings after suffering a dizzy spell. He finished the series with 480 runs at 60.00, the highest average across both teams, and was awarded Australian Player of the Series.

Despite a relatively short career of 25 Tests, Rogers retired having gained admiration for his watchful, consistent batting at the top of the order; in particular, during the two Ashes series he played in England, he was one of Australia's most consistent batsmen in the seaming and swinging conditions. For all but the first few Tests of his international career, he formed a successful opening partnership with David Warner, generally playing an anchoring role to Warner's more aggressive style; in only 41 innings together, the pair shared nine century partnerships.

Rogers received a belated sendoff at the 2015 Boxing Day Test where he rode a lap of honour around the MCG and received a mushroom stand to rest his Baggy Green cap.

Test centuries scored by Chris Rogers
| No. | Score | Opponents | Venue | Date |
|---|---|---|---|---|
| 1 | 110 | England | Riverside Ground, Chester-le-Street | 9 August 2013 |
| 2 | 116 | England | Melbourne Cricket Ground | 26 December 2013 |
| 3 | 119 | England | Sydney Cricket Ground | 3 January 2014 |
| 4 | 107 | South Africa | St George's Park, Port Elizabeth | 20 February 2014 |
| 5 | 173 | England | Lord's, London | 16 July 2015 |

== Coaching career ==
In August 2020, Rogers was appointed as the head coach of the Victorian men's team on a two-year contract.

In January 2022, Rogers was named caretaker head-coach of the Melbourne Stars after the club's BBL team's entire support staff, including head coach David Hussey, tested positive to COVID-19, alongside 10 players.

== Career best performances ==
| | Batting | | | |
| | Score | Fixture | Venue | Season |
|---|---|---|---|---|
| Test | 173 | Australia v England | Lord's, London | 2015 |
| FC | 319 | Northamptonshire v Gloucestershire | County Cricket Ground, Northampton | 2006 |
| LA | 140 | Victoria v South Australia | MCG, Melbourne | 2013 |
| T20 | 58 | Leicestershire v Derbyshire | Grace Road, Leicester | 2011 |

Sporting positions
| Preceded by Rikki Clarke | Derbyshire County Cricket Club captain 2009 | Succeeded by Greg Smith |
| Preceded by Neil Dexter | Middlesex County Cricket Club captain 2014 | Succeeded by Adam Voges |
| Preceded by Marcus Trescothick | Somerset County Cricket Club captain 2016 | Succeeded by Tom Abell |
