= Steffan Jones =

Welsh cricketer (born 1974)

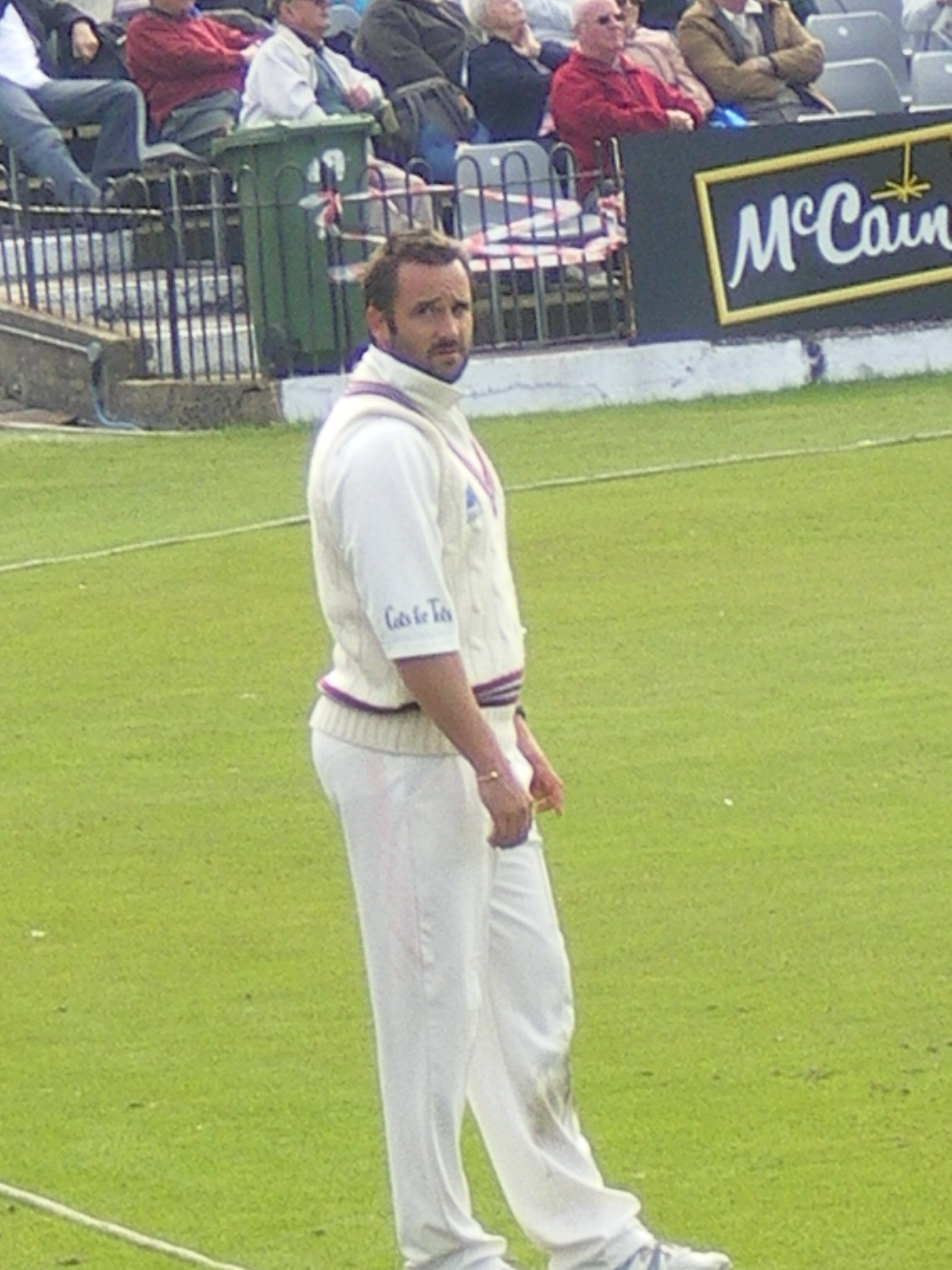
- Jones in 2008

Personal information
- Full name: Philip Steffan Jones
- Born: 9 February 1974 (age 52); Llanelli, Carmarthenshire, Wales
- Nickname: Jona
- Height: 6 ft 1 in (1.85 m)
- Batting: Right-handed
- Bowling: Right-arm fast-medium
- Role: Bowler

Domestic team information
- Years: Team
- 1997: Cambridge University
- 1997–2003: Somerset
- 2004–2005: Northamptonshire
- 2006: Derbyshire
- 2007–2009: Somerset
- 2009: → Kent (loan)
- 2009: → Derbyshire (loan)
- 2010–2011: Derbyshire

Career statistics
Competition	FC	LA	T20
Matches	148	191	56
Runs scored	2,708	725	204
Batting average	18.72	12.71	17.00
100s/50s	2/8	0/0	0/0
Top score	114	42	40
Balls bowled	24,419	8,553	1,063
Wickets	387	256	48
Bowling average	36.87	29.25	31.43
5 wickets in innings	10	3	0
10 wickets in match	1	0	0
Best bowling	6/25	6/56	3/20
Catches/stumpings	34/–	31/–	7/–
- Source: Cricinfo, 7 May 2012

Philip Steffan Jones (born 9 February 1974) is a former professional cricketer who played for Somerset, Northamptonshire, Derbyshire and Kent County Cricket Clubs. He was a right-handed batsman and right-arm fast-medium pace bowler. He is now a teacher and occasionally a bowling coach.

Born in Llanelli, Carmarthenshire, Jones attended Ysgol y Strade in Llanelli, Loughborough University and Homerton College, Cambridge. He played for Cambridge University in 1997 and took 9–148 in the Varsity match that season. He made his first-class debut for Somerset later that season and spent seven years with them before having two unsuccessful seasons with Northamptonshire in 2004 and 2005. Playing for Derbyshire in 2006 Jones had much more success taking 59 wickets including a career best 6–25 against Glamorgan. He returned to Somerset for the 2007 season.

Although primarily playing as a bowler he was also a useful lower-order batsman, with two first-class centuries to his name, both while playing for Somerset, scoring 105 against the New Zealanders in 1999, as well as 110 not out against Leicestershire in April 2007.

Jones joined Kent on loan for one month at the start of the 2009 season, subsequently returning to Somerset and then spending the end of the season with Derbyshire. After impressing by taking 30 wickets and scoring two half-centuries, he signed a two-year contract to remain with Derbyshire until 2011, taking on a coaching role in addition to his playing duties. He retired from cricket at the end of the 2011 season to take up a post at Wellington School, Somerset, where he is the head of Sports Performance and Wellbeing.

In March 2022, Steffan was contracted by Rajasthan Royals as their high performance fast bowling coach for the 2022 Indian Premier League season. He had previously been the team's fast bowling coach in 2019.
