= Greg Smith (cricketer, born 1983) =

British-South African cricketer

Personal information
- Full name: Gregory Marc Smith
- Born: 20 April 1983 (age 43); Johannesburg, Transvaal Province, South Africa
- Batting: Right-handed
- Bowling: Right-arm medium-fast Right-arm off break
- Role: All-rounder

Domestic team information
- Years: Team
- 2003–2004: Griqualand West
- 2004–2011: Derbyshire
- 2010: Mountaineers
- 2012–2015: Essex
- FC debut: 3 October 2003 South Africa Academy v Sri Lanka A
- Last FC: 6 July 2015 Essex v Lancashire
- LA debut: 21 November 2003 Griqualand West v KwaZulu-Natal
- Last LA: 28 August 2014 Essex v Warwickshire

Career statistics
| Competition | FC | LA | T20 |
|---|---|---|---|
| Matches | 124 | 108 | 86 |
| Runs scored | 5,635 | 2,342 | 1,452 |
| Batting average | 30.62 | 24.65 | 19.89 |
| 100s/50s | 7/34 | 0/11 | 1/5 |
| Top score | 177 | 89 | 100* |
| Balls bowled | 12,202 | 2,839 | 798 |
| Wickets | 184 | 72 | 42 |
| Bowling average | 35.33 | 36.87 | 25.95 |
| 5 wickets in innings | 4 | 0 | 2 |
| 10 wickets in match | 0 | 0 | 0 |
| Best bowling | 5/42 | 4/53 | 5/17 |
| Catches/stumpings | 43/– | 39/– | 35/– |
- Source: CricketArchive, 12 April 2016

Gregory Marc Smith (born 20 April 1983) is a British-South African former cricketer. He is a right-handed batsman and a right-arm medium-fast bowler who formerly played for Essex. He had previously played for Derbyshire for eight years. Since retiring he has moved to Cornwall where he captains and coaches Penzance. In his first year they struggled to find form and lost to Helston 3 times in a season.

Smith was born in Johannesburg. His international cricketing career began when he played in the Under-19 World Cup competition of 2002 for South Africa, debuting with a steady bowling performance against Bangladesh in a convincing victory for his side. South Africa were to make it to the final of the competition, in which Smith scored a half-century from the number one batting position, though it was not enough to see his team win the match, as this was countered by a century by New South Wales' Under-19 Australian representative Jarrad Burke.

Smith made his first appearance in first-class cricket in October 2003, playing for Griqualand West in the 2003–04 SuperSport series, in which the team finished in second place in the league. Smith would make one half-century during 2003–04, against Boland, and left the team in the summer of 2004.

Desperate for a County Championship place at a burgeoning team, Smith joined Derbyshire and made his debut Second XI Championship appearance in the same period, in July 2004. However, having scored a duck, he was not to appear again for the side until the 2005 season, where he played in both the Second XI Championship and Trophy.

Smith made his debut in the County Championship in the 2006 season, scoring steadily with the bat from the middle order and even trying his hand at bowling during the second innings. As Derbyshire finished mid-table during 2006, Smith stepped in for more appearances for the side, and looked promising for the team's future.

In 2008, Smith scored the 20th century in the history of the Twenty20 Cup with a 62-ball innings against Yorkshire Carnegie on 12 June 2008. He ended on exactly 100 not out, in a winning performance for Derbyshire.

This, as well as other strong performances, led to him being awarded a new contract which will keep him at Derbyshire for a further two years. He has completed his residency period and is looking to qualify as an English player, following a similar path to that of Kevin Pietersen, for example, but in the meantime plays as a Kolpak player.

During the 2011 season, it was announced that he would leave Derbyshire at the end of the season, and in September 2011, he was signed by Essex on a two-year deal, up to the end of the 2013 season. Although continuing with the club after his initial contract ended, he was one of four players released by Essex at the end of the 2015 season. In February 2016 he announced his retirement from first-class cricket, having taken a job as Director of Cricket Development and Head Coach for Penzance Cricket Club.

Sporting positions
| Preceded by Chris Rogers | Derbyshire County Cricket Club captain 2010 | Succeeded by Luke Sutton |
