= Dan Redfern =

English cricketer

Daniel Redfern
Personal information
- Full name: Daniel James Redfern
- Born: 18 April 1990 (age 36); Shrewsbury, Shropshire, England
- Batting: Left-handed
- Bowling: Right-arm off break

Domestic team information
- Years: Team
- 2006–2013: Derbyshire (squad no. 19)
- 2014–2015: Leicestershire (squad no. 6)

Career statistics
Competition	FC	LA	T20
Matches	85	50	16
Runs scored	3,905	765	117
Batting average	28.71	19.61	9.00
100s/50s	2/29	0/3	0/0
Top score	133	57*	43
Balls bowled	1,364	424	201
Wickets	21	9	10
Bowling average	38.80	39.00	24.60
5 wickets in innings	0	0	0
10 wickets in match	0	0	0
Best bowling	3/33	2/10	2/17
Catches/stumpings	41/–	11/–	7/–
- Source: CricketArchive, 1 August 2016

Daniel James Redfern (born 18 April 1990) is an English cricketer born at Shrewsbury, Shropshire. He is one of the youngest players ever to play List A limited overs cricket. He made his debut for Derbyshire Phantoms in a NatWest Pro40 League match against Worcestershire Royals at New Road, Worcester on 3 September 2006, aged 16 years and 138 days. He is a left-handed batsman and an off-spin bowler and has played 11 times for England Under-19s. He attended Haberdashers' Adams, in Newport, Shropshire.

A product of Derbyshire's Academy, he signed his first professional contract in July 2008, keeping him at the club until the end of the 2010 season.

Following this, he scored his maiden One Day half-century in a tied Pro40 match against Yorkshire, hitting 57 not out but as Derbyshire narrowly missed out on a win. In August, he made his first Championship start of the year, in a high-scoring draw against Warwickshire, where he scored 11 runs and took one for seven in Warwickshire's second innings.

On 5 April 2012, Redfern hit his maiden first-class century in a 160 partnership for the sixth wicket. After being put in at 50/4, Redfern hit 110 in 143 balls, spending the best part of three hours at the crease.

In October, Redfern signed a three-year contract with Derbyshire after helping them to achieve promotion. He averaged 37.71 in first-class in 2012.

On 24 February 2014, Redfern joined Leicestershire on a two-year contract, but it was not renewed, and he was released from the club in late 2015.

In December 2015, Redfern signed for Shropshire - as well as returning to play in the North Staffs and South Cheshire League with Leycett.
