= Garry Park =

South African-born English cricketer

Personal information
- Full name: Garry Terence Park
- Born: 19 April 1983 (age 43); Empangeni, Natal, South Africa
- Batting: Right-handed
- Bowling: Right-arm medium-fast
- Role: All-rounder, Wicket-keeper
- Relatives: Craig Park (brother); Sean Park (brother)

Domestic team information
- Years: Team
- 2005–2008: Durham
- 2009–2012: Derbyshire
- 2005: Cambridge MCCU
- 2013: Unicorns
- FC debut: 12 April 2003 Cambridge MCCU v Essex
- LA debut: 7 August 2005 Durham v Bangladesh A
- Source: Cricinfo, 28 May 2024

Garry Terence Park (born 19 April 1983 in Empangeni, KwaZulu-Natal) is a South African-born English cricketer. He is a right-handed batsman and a right-arm medium-fast bowler.

Park initially represented CUCCE, during the 2003 season, representing them for the first time in April 2003, joining Durham in the summer of 2006. Due to a lack of first-team opportunities, he joined Derbyshire in October 2008 and left the club in July 2012.

Park made his debut first-class century for Durham in 2006. He represented England as a substitute fielder in the 1st Test versus his native country on 12 July 2008.
