= Jonathan Clare =

English cricketer (born 1986)

Personal information
- Full name: Jonathan Luke Clare
- Born: 14 June 1986 (age 40); Burnley, Lancashire, England
- Height: 6 ft 3 in (1.91 m)
- Batting: Right-handed
- Bowling: Right-arm medium-fast
- Role: All-rounder

Domestic team information
- Years: Team
- 2007–2015: Derbyshire (squad no. 13)
- FC debut: 6 September 2007 Derbyshire v Nottinghamshire
- Last FC: 23 July 2015 Derbyshire v Australians
- LA debut: 4 September 2007 Derbyshire v Durham
- Last LA: 20 June 2013 Derbyshire v Scotland

Career statistics
Competition	FC	LA	T20
Matches	57	41	37
Runs scored	1,725	321	215
Batting average	23.63	11.46	14.33
100s/50s	2/8	0/1	0/0
Top score	130	57	35*
Balls bowled	7,073	1,292	346
Wickets	154	30	9
Bowling average	27.71	40.13	55.55
5 wickets in innings	6	0	0
10 wickets in match	1	0	0
Best bowling	7/74	3/39	2/20
Catches/stumpings	28/–	11/–	14/–
- Source: CricketArchive, 12 April 2016

Jonathan Luke Clare (born 14 June 1986) is an English cricketer who formerly played for Derbyshire. An all-rounder, he is a right-handed batsman and a right-arm medium-pace bowler.

== Early life ==
Clare was born in Burnley, Lancashire. He attended St Theodore's RC High School in the town. From a young age he played for Burnley Cricket Club, following in the footsteps of fellow cricketer James Anderson.

== Career ==
Clare's Second XI Championship debut came as a sixteen-year-old in the 2003 competition, in which he played two games for his home county, Lancashire's second XI team. Clare has been regularly appearing for Derbyshire's Second XI since 2005, making his debut in the competition with a half-century against Nottinghamshire's Second XI. Clare made his List A debut for Derbyshire in the 2007 Pro40 League competition, playing against Durham. Batting from the lower-middle order, he was bowled out for 12 runs in his first innings by Liam Plunkett, before bowling two expensive overs in the Durham innings. Jonathan Clare's grandfather, John Clare, played Lancashire League cricket for Burnley for seven years, grandson having played sporadically in the competition since the age of fourteen, having made his debut in the competition as an opener in 2001, alongside professional representative, Dale Benkenstein. Clare's appearance in the County Championship made him Derbyshire's thirteenth debutant of the season, a record exceeded, save for the county's debut season, merely twice since their foundation. Clare made his first-class debut on 6 September 2007, against Notts. He gained the distinction of taking five wickets on debut, when he took 5–90 in Notts' only innings. On 10 September 2007, it was confirmed Clare would be awarded a county contract for the 2008 season, and on 13 May 2008, Clare signed a contract to last until the end of 2009. After missing most of the last two seasons due to injury, it was announced in September 2015 that Clare had been released by Derbyshire, having played in a total of 136 games for the club, 57 of them at first-class levels.
