= Wes Durston =

English cricketer

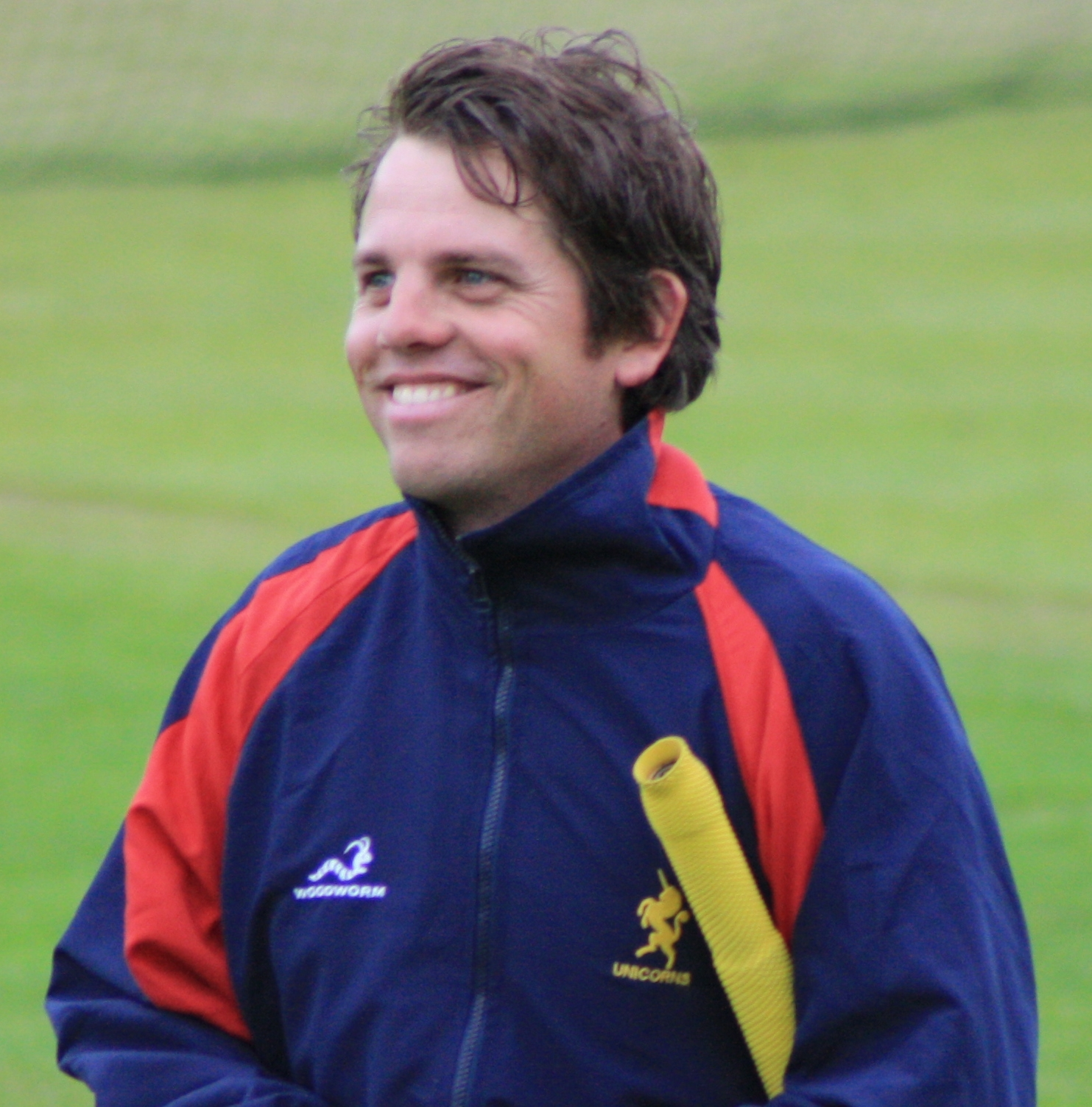

Personal information
- Full name: Wesley John Durston
- Born: 6 October 1980 (age 46); Taunton, Somerset, England
- Height: 5 ft 10 in (1.78 m)
- Batting: Right-handed
- Bowling: Right-arm off break
- Role: Batsman

Domestic team information
- Years: Team
- 2000–2002: Somerset Cricket Board
- 2002–2009: Somerset
- 2010: Unicorns
- 2010–2016: Derbyshire
- 2017–2019: Wiltshire
- FC debut: 24 July 2002 Somerset v West Indies A
- LA debut: 2 May 2000 Somerset CB v Staffordshire

Career statistics
Competition	FC	LA	T20
Matches	109	122	119
Runs scored	5,346	3,047	2,500
Batting average	33.41	34.23	26.04
100s/50s	6/32	5/14	1/15
Top score	151	134	111
Balls bowled	7,895	2,223	1,182
Wickets	119	54	61
Bowling average	39.92	38.44	25.00
5 wickets in innings	4	0	0
10 wickets in match	0	0	0
Best bowling	6/109	3/7	3/14
Catches/stumpings	113/–	45/–	43/–
- Source: CricketArchive, 1 August 2016

Wesley John Durston (born 6 October 1980) is an English cricketer who most recently played for Derbyshire, having represented Somerset between 1999 and 2009, and the Unicorns during the 2010 season. He learnt his cricket at Millfield School and is a right-handed batsman and off break bowler.

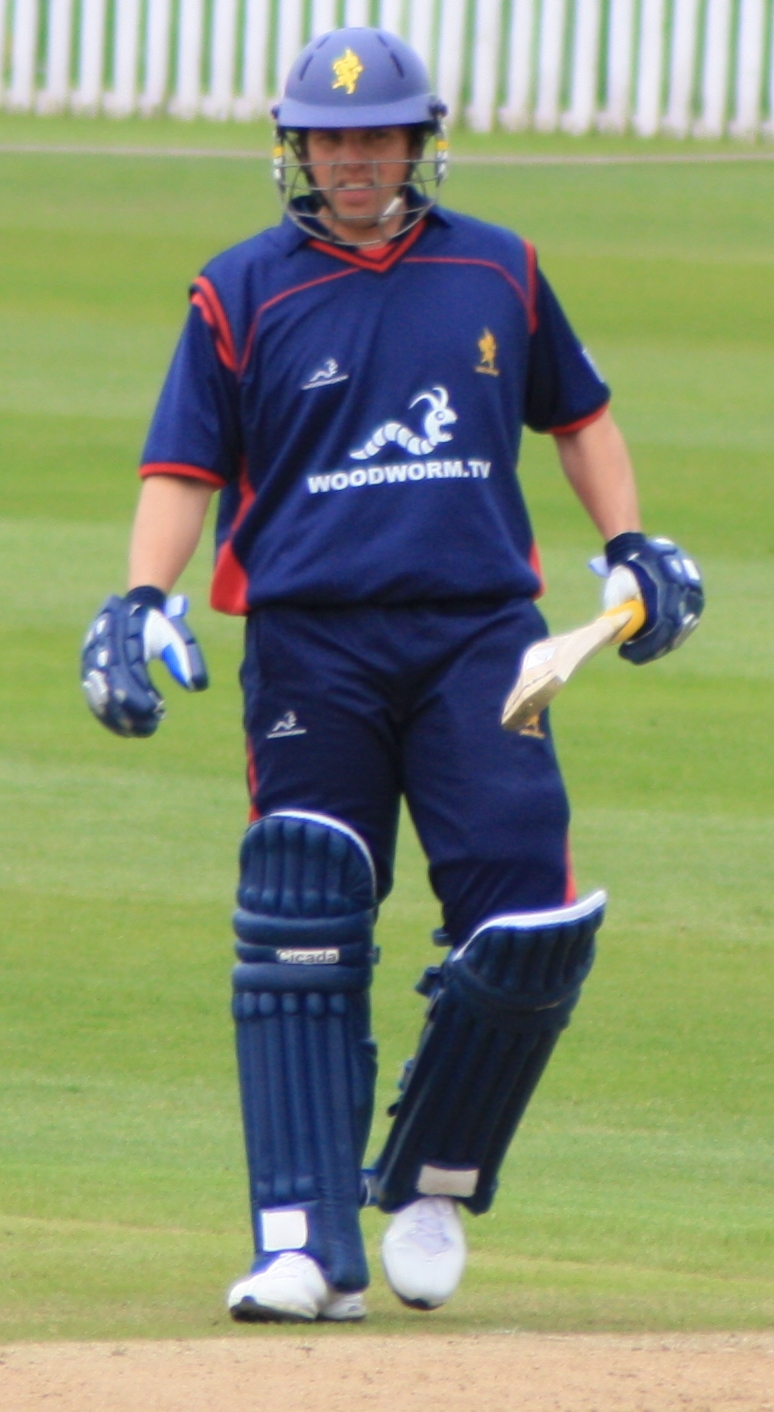
Durston batting for the Unicorns.

He made his debut for the Somerset Second XI in 1999 and his List A debut for Somerset Cricket Board in the 2000 NatWest Trophy. He made his first-class debut for Somerset against West Indies 'A' in 2002 and made his Championship debut in 2003. He made more appearances in 2005 and was particularly valuable in one day games. In 2006 he became a regular member of the team. His maiden first-class century was 146* against Derbyshire at Derby in 2005. His best bowling in first-class cricket is 3–23 against Sri Lanka 'A' in 2004. Although he did not score a century in 2006 he did get seven Championship scores over 50 and was the leading fielder with 15 catches. He was released by Somerset in November 2009 when his contract expired.

In 2010, Durston was selected as one of 21 players to form the first Unicorns squad to take part in the Clydesdale Bank 40 domestic limited overs competition against the regular first-class counties. The Unicorns were made up of 15 former county cricket professionals and 6 young cricketers looking to make it in the professional game. Durston impressed with the bat in the early stages of the competition, and after an unbeaten century against Sussex, he was offered a contract to play Twenty20 cricket for Derbyshire for the 2010 season. After impressing for Derbyshire in the limited overs formats of the game, Durston was offered a full playing contract, and became a permanent fixture in both the four-day and one-day Derbyshire sides. He was released by mutual consent at the end of the 2016 season.

Having coached at Oakham School shortly after retirement from the professional game, Durston is now Assistant Coach for Loughborough Women's MCCU and Loughborough Lightning in the Kia Super League. He plays club cricket for Oakham Cricket Club in Rutland in the ECB Leicestershire Premier League.
