= Tim Groenewald =

South African cricketer

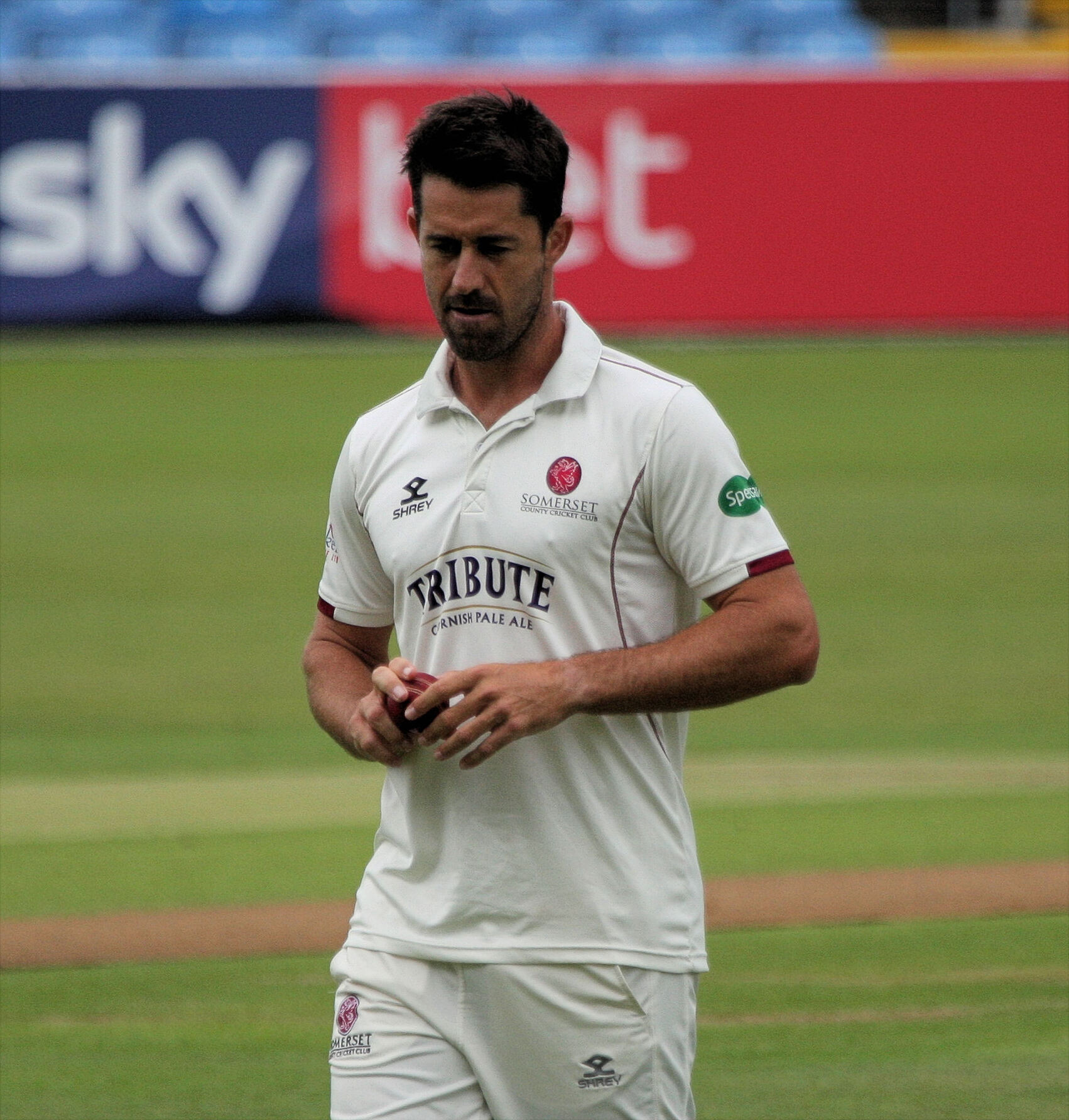
- Groenewald in 2019

Personal information
- Full name: Timothy Duncan Groenewald
- Born: 10 January 1984 (age 42); Pietermaritzburg, Natal Province, South Africa
- Height: 6 ft 2 in (1.88 m)
- Batting: Right-handed
- Bowling: Right-arm fast-medium
- Role: Bowler

Domestic team information
- Years: Team
- 2006–2008: Warwickshire (squad no. 14)
- 2009–2014: Derbyshire (squad no. 12)
- 2014: → Somerset (on loan)
- 2015–2019: Somerset (squad no. 5)
- 2020: Kent (squad no. 36)
- FC debut: 15 April 2006 Warwickshire v Cambridge UCCE
- LA debut: 30 April 2006 Warwickshire v Scotland

Career statistics
Competition	FC	LA	T20
Matches	139	109	114
Runs scored	2,375	793	401
Batting average	17.72	19.82	14.32
100s/50s	0/6	0/2	0/0
Top score	78	57	41
Balls bowled	23,179	4,321	2,065
Wickets	403	123	99
Bowling average	29.53	32.93	29.53
5 wickets in innings	16	0	0
10 wickets in match	0	0	0
Best bowling	6/50	4/22	4/21
Catches/stumpings	45/–	26/–	29/–
- Source: CricInfo, 20 July 2021

Timothy Duncan Groenewald (born 10 January 1984) is an English-South African former professional cricketer. He played as a right-arm medium-fast bowler for Warwickshire, Derbyshire, Somerset and Kent County Cricket Clubs before retiring during the 2021 season. He was born in Pietermaritzburg, South Africa but holds a British passport through his mother and, as a result, played as a domestic player in county cricket.

Groenewald first played for Warwickshire's Second XI in the 2004 season, as a 20-year-old. After one further season as a Second XI bowler, including a run to the semi-final of the Second XI Trophy of 2005, Groenewald made his County Championship debut in April 2006, taking two wickets. He continued to play for the first team on a semi-regular basis, and was part of the Warwickshire team which played host to the touring West Indies A team in July 2006. Groenewald was part of the Warwickshire team which won the Second XI Trophy in the 2006 season. He signed for Derbyshire in October 2008 after his Warwickshire contract was cancelled by mutual consent.

He enjoyed a good first season with Derbyshire in 2009, taking 34 first-class wickets and was rewarded with a new contract which was to see him through to the end of the 2010 season.

In June 2014, Somerset announced the signing of Groenewald on loan for the remainder of the season, at the end of which he signed a three-year permanent contract.

In September 2019 Groenewald signed a two-year contract with Kent. He played in nine matches during the COVID-19 shortened 2020 season, taking seven wickets, but retired in July 2021 after failing to recover quickly enough following surgery on his knee in April. He stayed with Kent as a coach for the remainder of their 2021 season.
