= Thomas Poynton =

English cricketer (born 1989)

Tom Poynton
Personal information
- Full name: Thomas Poynton
- Born: 25 November 1989 (age 36); Burton upon Trent, Staffordshire, England
- Batting: Right-handed
- Role: Wicket-keeper

Domestic team information
- Years: Team
- 2007–2016: Derbyshire (squad no. 23)
- FC debut: 8 July 2007 Derbyshire v Middlesex
- Last FC: 26 June 2016 Derbyshire v Kent
- LA debut: 16 July 2007 Derbyshire v Glamorgan
- Last LA: 12 June 2016 Derbyshire v Yorkshire

Career statistics
Competition	FC	LA	T20
Matches	47	31	39
Runs scored	1,155	173	275
Batting average	18.62	11.53	15.27
100s/50s	1/6	0/0	0/0
Top score	106	40	37*
Balls bowled	48	–	–
Wickets	2	–	–
Bowling average	48.00	–	–
5 wickets in innings	0	–	–
10 wickets in match	0	–	–
Best bowling	2/96	–	–
Catches/stumpings	107/10	18/5	17/11
- Source: CricketArchive, 18 July 2016

Thomas Poynton (born 25 November 1989) is an English former cricketer who played for Derbyshire. He is a right-handed batsman and a wicket-keeper.

Poynton made his County Championship debut in July 2007, against Middlesex, having represented the team three times during the 2006 Second XI Championship season. Poynton made two appearances in the Twenty20 Cup and six appearances in the Pro40 competition. Poynton has also made six appearances for the England U19s, playing against South Africa and Bangladesh.

In 2014, Poynton was involved in a car crash in which his father was killed and he sustained an injury to his ankle. The injury forced Poynton to retire from cricket in July 2016.
