= Chesney Hughes =

West Indian cricketer (born 1991)

Personal information
- Full name: Chesney Francis Hughes
- Born: 20 January 1991 (age 35); Anguilla
- Batting: Left-handed
- Bowling: Slow left-arm orthodox

Domestic team information
- Years: Team
- 2006–2008: Anguilla
- 2010–2016: Derbyshire (squad no. 22)
- 2009–2019: Leeward Islands
- 2017: Northamptonshire
- FC debut: 10 May 2012 Derbyshire v Middlesex
- LA debut: 19 October 2007 West Indies U19 v Jamaica

Career statistics
Competition	FC	LA	T20
Matches	87	90	93
Runs scored	4,716	1,748	1,661
Batting average	31.65	21.58	19.54
100s/50s	10/20	0/12	0/5
Top score	270*	81	65
Balls bowled	1,976	1,168	684
Wickets	29	27	28
Bowling average	46.03	37.62	31.82
5 wickets in innings	0	1	0
10 wickets in match	0	0	0
Best bowling	3/87	5/29	4/23
Catches/stumpings	61/–	26/–	28/–
- Source: ESPNcricinfo, 16 January 2021

Chesney Francis Hughes (born 20 January 1991) is a West Indian cricketer who plays for the Leeward Islands cricket team. He was born in Anguilla.

Having held a British passport, Hughes signed for Derbyshire in June 2009, he made his List A debut for the side during the 2009 Pro40 League against Warwickshire, scoring 4 runs.

In the early 2010 season Hughes started by scoring 41 on his first-class debut against Middlesex at Lord's in May 2010. Two weeks later he reached three figures for the first time in first-class cricket in only his fifth innings of county cricket at the age of 19. The rest of the 2010 season saw Hughes go on to score another century, 156 against Northamptonshire at Chesterfield, and a further three half centuries, one of them being a match winning 96* on a questionable wicket at Bristol.

In total, 2010 saw Hughes amass 784 runs at an average of 41.26 in Championship cricket. In limited overs cricket, he scored 422 runs at an average of 35.16.

During the winter months of 2010/11, Hughes played in the Caribbean after he was selected in the Leewards Islands squad.

In 2013, playing against Yorkshire at Headingley, Hughes scored 270 not out, his highest first-class score. At the time it was also the second-highest individual innings in Derbyshire's history. In the same year he qualified for England, as well as the West Indies.

Despite averaging 53 in the County Championship in 2016, he left Derbyshire that season, and played his last first-class match to date for the Leeward Islands in 2017.
