= Durham County Cricket Club in 2005 =

Durham Dynamos
2005 season
- Captain: Michael Hussey
- Ground(s): Riverside, Chester-le-Street

Durham County Cricket Club started the 2005 season with odds of 20-1 to win the Second Division of the County Championship, and in one-day cricket they started the season in Division Two of the National League. However, they were promoted in both competitions - in the County Championship, they finished second after an initial run of four wins and eight matches without defeat. They only lost two of 16 Championship matches, securing promotion a week before the end of the tournament. In the National League, they were promoted with two weeks to spare, and won their last five matches - yet finished two points behind Sussex Sharks, who had a similar run. The cup competitions gave them lower final placings, however - in the C&G Trophy, they were knocked out in the first round by Derbyshire, and without internationals Mike Hussey and Paul Collingwood, who played in the NatWest Series, they lost five of eight matches in the group stages in the Twenty20 Cup to finish fifth in the North Division.

Durham played 16 first class games in 2005, winning six, drawing eight and losing two. In 20 List A matches, they won twelve, lost six, and had two no-results, while eight Twenty20 matches resulted in two wins, five losses and one no-result.

== Players ==
- Jimmy Maher
- Ashley Noffke
- Brad Williams
- David Barrick
- Dale Benkenstein
- Gareth Breese
- Graeme Bridge
- Kyle Coetzer
- Paul Collingwood
- Mark Davies
- Michael Gough
- Gavin Hamilton
- Stephen Harmison
- Neil Killeen
- Jonathan Lewis
- James Lowe
- Gordon Muchall
- Philip Mustard
- Graham Onions
- Nicky Peng
- Liam Plunkett
- Andrew Pratt
- Gary Pratt
- Gary Scott
- Callum Thorp
- Mark Turner
- Alan Walker

== Tables ==
=== Championship ===
2005 County Championship - Division Two
Pos	Team	Pld	W	D	L	Pen	Bat	Bowl	Pts
1	Lancashire	16	7	6	3	0	43	47	212
2	Durham	16	6	8	2	0	45	44	205
3	Yorkshire	16	5	10	1	0.5	49	42	200.5
4	Northamptonshire	16	5	8	3	0	45	46	193
5	Essex	16	5	7	4	0	51	36	185
6	Worcestershire	16	5	4	7	5.5	53	46	179.5
7	Leicestershire	16	3	7	6	0.5	45	45	159.5
8	Somerset	16	4	5	7	0	42	37	155
9	Derbyshire	16	1	7	8	0	31	43	116

=== totesport League ===
2005 totesport League - Division Two
Pos	Team	Pld	W	L	NR	T	Pts
1	Sussex Sharks	18	13	4	1	0	54
2	Durham Dynamos	18	12	4	2	0	52
3	Warwickshire Bears	18	10	6	2	0	44
4	Leicestershire Foxes	18	10	7	1	0	42
5	Derbyshire Phantoms	18	9	7	1	1	40
6	Somerset Sabres	18	9	8	1	0	38
7	Surrey Lions	18	7	10	1	0	30
8	Kent Spitfires	18	6	10	2	0	28
9	Yorkshire Phoenix	18	5	13	0	0	20
10	Scottish Saltires	18	2	14	1	1	12

=== Twenty20 Group Stage (North) ===
2005 Twenty20 Cup - North Division
Team	M	W	L	NR	Pts	NRR
Lancashire Lightning	8	6	1	1	13	+1.77
Leicestershire Foxes	8	5	2	1	11	+0.25
Derbyshire Phantoms	8	4	3	1	9	-0.45
Yorkshire Phoenix	8	3	5	0	6	-0.70
Durham Dynamos	8	2	5	1	5	-0.87
Nottinghamshire Outlaws	8	2	6	0	4	+0.13

== Match details ==
=== April ===
Durham won all four games in April, taking two Championship wins well inside the four-day time limit as they beat Leicestershire by an innings inside three days, gaining 22 points and the Championship lead, and Worcestershire by seven wickets inside two days, which they kept . In the National League, they won their first game against Leicestershire by nine runs on the Duckworth-Lewis method to go second in the table behind Yorkshire on net run rate. They followed this up with a 138-run win over Surrey, their highest win margin by runs all season, to take over the lead in the National League as well.

==== County Championship: Leicestershire v Durham (13–15 April) ====
Durham (22pts) beat Leicestershire (1pt) by an innings and 216 runs

Durham won the toss against Leicestershire and elected to bat first at Grace Road, Leicester. Durham's Australian left-handed opener, Mike Hussey, who had not yet been selected for Australia's Test team, then made an undefeated 165 off 290 balls on the first day. Former England Under-19 batsman Gordon Muchall helped Hussey add 166 for the third-wicket partnership, before being run out for 82, and Durham finished day one on 325 for 3.

On the second day, Hussey powered on, and was seventh man out for 253, an innings that included three sixes and 33 fours. Durham finally declared on 523 for 8 off 161 overs. It did not get much better for Leicestershire when they finally did get to bat on a pitch was much less placid than on the first day. Liam Plunkett soon took their first four wickets, and also had a dropped catch off his bowling, as Leicestershire made it to 49 for 4. Leicestershire went on to finish their first innings on 123 all out, and Plunkett finished with five for 43, to make Leicestershire follow on exactly 400 behind. They made 10 without loss by the end of the day. Steve Harmison, England's fast bowler whose Test wickets had come at a bowling average above 60 on the recent tour of South Africa, could not take a wicket and was upstaged by Plunkett.

Durham spent 70.3 third-day overs on the process of finishing off Leicestershire. Harmison got his first first-class wickets of the season, grabbing four for 30 as Leicestershire were dismissed for 184. At one stage, Harmison had taken three wickets in a 15-ball spell without conceding a run. Plunkett also added to his first-innings five-for, with three for 55, and only one Leicestershire batsman, John Maunders, was able to score a fifty. (Cricinfo scorecard)

==== National League: Leicestershire v Durham (17 April) ====
Durham (4pts) beat Leicestershire (0pts) by nine runs (D/L method)

Leicestershire Foxes won the toss at Grace Road, Leicester and elected to bat. Liam Plunkett continued his run after eight wickets in the Championship match, dismissing John Maunders and Aftab Habib early, as the Foxes lost their first two wickets for four runs. Darren Maddy and HD Ackerman then put on 98 for the third wicket, before Durham took the last six wickets for 73 as Leicestershire ended on 175 for 8 off their 45 overs. Durham Dynamos were 85 for 3 from 22 overs when rain prevented further play, leaving Durham the winners on the Duckworth-Lewis method. (BBC scorecard)

==== County Championship: Durham v Worcestershire (20–21 April) ====
Durham (19pts) beat Worcestershire (3pts) by seven wickets

Worcestershire won the toss at Chester-le-Street and chose to bat first, and Stephen Peters and Stephen Moore started them off with a 75-run opening stand. Then Mark Davies, who played 12 of 17 matches in 2005, took six wickets for 32 to reduce them to 120, before Steve Harmison (three wickets) and Paul Collingwood (one wicket) finished off the tail to bowl Worcestershire out for 171. Collingwood then returned with the bat and got to 88 not out, to leave Durham 32 behind with eight wickets in hand at the close of play.

On the second day, Collingwood completed his century, falling for 129 when Durham were 229 for 4. The last six Durham wickets then added 57 to leave them with a lead of 115. Liam Plunkett, who had taken eight wickets in the first game but conceded 55 runs for no wicket in the first innings in this second game, then returned to knock out three top-order wickets. The rest of the bowling unit performed well, and Steve Harmison took a hat-trick on his way to five for 61. Harmison later said, "The way I was feeling, my tail was up and I felt I could go through them. The position they were in I don’t think they were too keen to hang around. Before the last ball [of the hat-trick], I felt confident. It was a decent ball in a decent area and I was glad when he [David Wigley] chopped it on."

Chaminda Vaas top-scored with 42 not out, as Worcester were bowled out for 146. This left Durham a target of 32 to win, which they got for the loss of three wickets to win with two days to spare. (Cricinfo scorecard)

==== National League: Durham v Surrey (24 April) ====
Durham (4pts) beat Surrey (0pts) by 138 runs

Durham Dynamos continued their 100% record to the season by scoring two and a half times as many runs as Surrey Lions at Chester-le-Street. The Lions chose to bowl first after winning the toss, and Tim Murtagh took three for 12 to peg back Durham. However, a stand between Dale Benkenstein and Gordon Muchall put on 100 helped the Dynamos to 224 for 8. The Lions then lost four wickets for two runs between the sixth and eighth overs, to be 27 for 4 and require 197 for the last six wickets. Liam Plunkett and Benkenstein took 4 wickets each as Surrey were dismissed for 86 in 30.1 overs. This was Surrey's fourth successive match without a victory. (Cricinfo scorecard)

=== May ===
Durham's 100%-record was broken by the rain, as the National League matches with Scottish Saltires and Sussex Sharks were rained off to leave Durham second in the National League table behind Yorkshire. On 5 May, they suffered their first loss, as Derbyshire beat them by one wicket. However, two Championship matches followed from 6 to 13 May, and Durham lengthened their run of Championship victories to four, beating Somerset at home and Lancashire at Old Trafford. Two days after beating Lancashire, Durham beat Yorkshire in the National League to go top of the table, and Yorkshire stayed in the North for a Championship match - Durham's win streak was broken as they teams drew, but Durham took ten points, as they finished their fourth innings on 226 for 8 chasing 245. The month was rounded off with a draw against Durham UCCE and two National League matches, one win and one loss (their first League loss of the season) to leave Durham with a 7.5-point lead in the Championship and a four-point lead in the League (although Yorkshire in second place had two games in hand).

==== National League: Scotland v Durham (1 May) ====
Match abandoned - Scotland (2pts), Durham (2pts)

This match, which was due to be played at The Grange, Edinburgh, was rained off without a ball being bowled. (BBC news)

==== National League: Durham v Sussex (2 May) ====
No result - Durham (2pts), Sussex (2pts)

At Chester-le-Street Durham Dynamos won the toss and put Sussex Sharks in to bat. Steve Harmison bowled well for his 1 for 24 off 9 overs, though it was Mick Lewis who took the wickets, ending with 5 for 48. For the Sharks, Johannes van der Wath top scored with 80 and shared a 110-run partnership with Robin Martin-Jenkins to pull Sussex out from 60 for 5 to a final total of 182 for 7 in 45 overs. In reply the Dynamos slumped to 9 for 2 off 7.3 overs, losing both openers for ducks before rain came and finished the match 15 balls before Duckworth-Lewis could be applied. (Cricinfo scorecard)

==== C&G Trophy Round One: Durham v Derbyshire (4–5 May) ====
Derbyshire beat Durham by one wicket to progress to Round Two of the C&G Trophy

Durham put on 234 in their 50 overs at Chester-le-Street, mostly thanks Paul Collingwood, who scored 82 from 83 balls. Derbyshire's Spin bowler Ant Botha took four for 44 from his ten overs, with three men caught. In reply, England Test bowler Steve Harmisontook three for 45, including Michael Di Venuto lbw with his third ball and Hassan Adnan caught at first slip. Derbyshire lost their first three wickets for 54, but their innings was anchored by Chris Bassano who made 57 from 104 balls. This, along with 50 from Graeme Welch, kept Derbyshire in the game, but it needed a tenth wicket partnership of 16 between Botha and Kevin Dean to see them through on the last ball of the game. (Cricinfo scorecard)

==== County Championship: Durham v Somerset (6–9 May) ====
Durham (19pts) beat Somerset (5pts) by four wickets

Durham saw off Somerset fast bowler Andy Caddick to win a match where all four innings were worth between 240 and 300 runs. Somerset chose to bat after winning the toss at Stockton-on-Tees, and England fast bowler Steve Harmison continued his return to form after 12 wickets in the previous two games, removing both Somerset openers, but conceded 72 runs from 18 overs in the process. It was England ODI all-rounder Paul Collingwood who got the most wickets, dismissing the Somerset top-scorers James Hildreth (caught by Gareth Breese for 70) and Ian Blackwell (bowled for 48) in addition to the three last lower-order wickets. In the first senior match on this ground in six years, Somerset were all out for 252 in 63.3 overs.

Somerset's bowling was spearheaded by Caddick, who he removed four Durham batsmen for single-figure scores, and at stumps on day one, Caddick had taken five wickets and reduced Durham to 141 for 7. On day two, however, Liam Plunkett made 74 and Mark Davies 62, batting at 8 and 10 respectively, and lifted Durham to 298 all out and a lead of 46 runs - while Caddick got one more wicket, ending with six for 106.

Harmison and Collingwood continued in the style of the first innings, although this time it was the faster of the two bowlers, Harmison, who took the most wickets. On the afternoon of the second day, he again dismissed both openers - including England opener Marcus Trescothick - and when Ian Blackwell (87) and Caddick added 78 for the last wicket, it was Harmison who got Blackwell out, caught by Liam Plunkett. Still, Blackwell's efforts helped set Durham a target of 243, but the Jamaican-born all-rounder Gareth Breese saw off the challenge of Caddick, who took yet another six-for - this time for 98 - to end with match figures of 12 for 104. Unfortunately, he was the only bowler to take wickets, and Michael Hussey (51), Dale Benkenstein (51) and the aforementioned Breese (79 not out) saw Durham reach the target to preserve their 100%-record in the Championship. (Cricinfo scorecard)

==== County Championship: Lancashire v Durham (11–13 May) ====
Durham (20pts) beat Lancashire (3pts) by nine wickets

Durham recorded another win, this time at Old Trafford. After winning the toss, Lancashire were bowled out for 199, Durham replied by making 92 for 2 by close on the first day. This continued on the second day, with Michael Hussey making 144 and wicket-keeper Phil Mustard 77 before they were all out for 338. Muttiah Muralitharan took five for 107, bowling 39 of Lancashire's 107 overs. Lancashire were struggling again at 135 for 5 at close, and only managed to make it to 173 on the third day, as Andrew Flintoff was the only Lancashire batsman to pass 20. Durham knocked off the 35 runs required for the win after losing one wicket. (InningsBreak scorecard)

==== National League: Durham v Yorkshire (15 May) ====
Durham (4pts) beat Yorkshire (0pts) by 51 runs

Durham took the lead in the National League to keep up their unbeaten run in League competitions after defeating Yorkshire Phoenix at Chester-le-Street. Yorkshire had won their first three League games before this match, and were second in the league. Durham batted first, and their first 20 overs yielded 60 runs (for no loss), but helped by Mike Hussey they picked up the pace, adding 196 in the last 25 overs to end with 256 for 4. Yorkshire's reply started at a quicker rate, but the Dynamos kept taking wickets, and they dismissed the Phoenix for 205. Paul Collingwood and Gareth Breese took three wickets each for Durham. (Cricinfo scorecard)

==== County Championship: Durham v Yorkshire (20–23 May) ====
Durham (10pts) drew with Yorkshire (9pts)

In the clash of the two top teams of Division Two of the Championship, Durham's streak of successive wins was finally broken, in what BBC described as a "thrilling draw", as England required fast bowler Steve Harmison to be rested. They bowled first, and had Yorkshire in positions of 124 for 7 and 179 for 9. However, Richard Dawson and Deon Kruis made 75 for the last wicket to take Yorkshire to a total of 254.

In reply, Durham trailed by 108 with four wickets in hand, but a seventh-wicket stand worth 126 between Gareth Breese and Philip Mustard lifted Durham to 316. With a 62-run deficit on first innings, Yorkshire lost their first seven wickets for 128 runs, but Anthony McGrath hit 133 not out - his second century of the season thus far, following his 165 not out against Leicestershire a week earlier. He was supported by Chris Silverwood, who hit 80 off 66 balls before eventually being bowled by Michael Lewis, who removed the five last batsmen to end with figures of five for 80.

The last three partnerships added 180, and Durham were set 245 to win in well over a day. They started sedately, as Michael Hussey (23 not out) and Jon Lewis (18 not out) took them to stumps on day three without losing a wicket, and cut 53 off the winning target. The fourth-day chase was intervened by rain, bad light and Yorkshire's South African bowler Kruis. Gordon Muchall and Hussey took Durham to 132 for 2, but Yorkshire grabbed wickets to get closer to a win. Eventually, the chase was stopped with Durham on 226 for 8, with Dale Benkenstein, their No. 4, hit 28 not out off 78 balls after, as BBC described it, "shut[ting] up shop in the last few overs" . (Cricinfo scorecard)

==== MCC University Match: Durham UCCE v Durham (25–27 May) ====
Match drawn

Durham had made five changes from the Championship game with Yorkshire which ended two days earlier, and the match with the local students ended in a draw, with Durham lacking one wicket and the students 47 runs for a win. The county side made 277 on the first day after David Balcombe took five for 112, and in reply, the students made 228 for 9 declared, after two bursts of wickets from New Zealand international Nathan Astle. Astle took three for 20, the best bowling figures, making up for his 11 with the bat in the first innings. Durham then scored runs at a run rate just above 3 to lead by 180 runs at stumps on day two with 8 wickets in hand. On the third day, Durham added 127 in 32 overs for the loss of five wickets to set the students 308 in 74 overs. Gareth Breese (three for 86) and Graeme Bridge (four for 54) took student wickets, but the UCCE finished on 261 for 9 to draw the game. (Cricinfo scorecard)

==== National League: Kent v Durham (29 May) ====
Durham (4pts) beat Kent (0pts) by one run

Durham Dynamos extended their unbeaten run in National League games to six as they got what the BBC described as an "unlikely" win at St Lawrence Ground. Having won the toss and batted, Durham made 189 after South African Andrew Hall took three for 17 off 8.5 overs. In reply, Hall made 72 as Kent were at 128 for 2 and 170 for 3, but Durham's overseas players Ashley Noffke (three for 33) and Nathan Astle (two for 21) saw to it that Kent lost six wickets for 17 runs, and Kent were tied down to such an extent that they needed three runs off the last ball to win - Martin Saggers could only take one bye, and Durham won by a solitary run. (Cricinfo scorecard)

==== National League: Surrey v Durham (30 May) ====
Surrey (4pts) beat Durham (0pts) by 43 runs

Durham Dynamos fell to their first defeat of their totesport League campaign at the Oval as Surrey's young batsmen avoided the loss of nine wickets which had happened in four of their five League matches so far - or, indeed, a sub-140 total, which they had been bowled out for twice so far. The hosts batted first, and as Liam Plunkett and Neil Killeen took two wickets each, Surrey were 26 for 4. James Benning, with 66 off 84 balls, and Rikki Clarke, with 54 off 67 balls, then put on 129, a record for Surrey against Durham. In the 38 overs the weather allowed, Surrey made 219. Tim Murtagh then took three wickets without conceding a run in his first three overs to knock Durham back to. A 95-run fourth-wicket stand between partnership between Nicky Peng and Dale Benkenstein could not lead them to victory, as they were finally bowled out for 176. (Cricinfo scorecard)

=== June ===
Durham played three Championship matches in June, and although they missed Paul Collingwood for two of them and Steve Harmison and Mike Hussey for all three, due to international duties, they won one and drew two to stretch their unbeaten run to eight - keeping them 21 points ahead of second-placed Worcestershire when the teams broke off to play Twenty20 cricket. There were also two National League matches - Durham beat Derbyshire to get revenge for the C&G Trophy loss a month earlier, which gave them a six-point lead, but in the last match before the summer break Sussex Sharks beat them by seven wickets, to close the gap to two points. The Sharks also had two games in hand over Durham.

==== County Championship: Worcestershire v Durham (1–4 June) ====
Worcestershire (9pts) drew with Durham (9pts)

The first day at Worcester was washed out by rain. Durham batted to 256 when they finally got a chance to bat on the second day, but more rain cut 35 overs off Worcestershire's innings, and Worcestershire were 226 for 7 at close on the third day. This was confirmed with the innings closing at 267 all out - Ben Smith making 123, while Ashley Noffke took four wickets - and Durham chose not to chase a victory, declaring on 180 for 2 with Paul Collingwood on 103 not out when stumps were drawn on the final day. (Cricinfo scorecard)

==== County Championship: Durham v Essex (9–11 June) ====
Durham (22pts) beat Essex (3pts) by an innings and 19 runs

Durham continued their run of unbeaten matches in the 2005 season by defeating Essex in just three days at Chester-le-Street. Durham batted first, and made a total of 505 in the first innings, with Gordon Muchall and stand-in captain Dale Benkenstein both making centuries and ten batsmen made it into double figures. The Durham bowlers then backed up the batsmen's efforts by seeing off the Essex batsmen in just 55 overs to leave them all out for 106, Ashley Noffke and Mark Davies taking four wickets each. Essex followed on 399 behind, and were 140 for 6 after three wickets from Davies, despite nightwatchman Dale Steyn making 82. However, number nine Andre Adams made 103, James Foster added 78, and Essex made it to 366 for 7 - before Davies grabbed two wickets, and Neil Killeen dismissed Foster to give Durham an innings win despite lacking internationals Paul Collingwood, Steve Harmison and Mike Hussey. They did have New Zealand international Nathan Astle in the side - he contributed with 15 runs and no wicket for 24. (BBC scorecard)

==== National League: Durham v Derbyshire (13 June) ====
Durham (4pts) beat Derbyshire (0pts) by five wickets

Derbyshire Phantoms posted their lowest score of the season with 82 all out after being put in to bowl at the Riverside Ground, and Durham Dynamos took their fifth victory in eight National League matches. Dale Benkenstein took four for 17, including two wickets in his first over, and Australian Ashley Noffke showed good bowling form with three for 16 and three maidens in seven overs. Durham's first four wickets fell for 36, with Kevin Dean grabbing two, but Gordon Muchall (26 off 61 balls) and Gary Pratt (23 off 48) added 40 for the fifth wicket to send Durham to a five-wicket win with just under 10 overs to spare. (Cricinfo scorecard)

==== County Championship: Northamptonshire v Durham (15–18 June) ====
Durham (10pts) drew with Northamptonshire (8pts)

The game at The County Ground, Northampton wasn't as badly hit by rain as many other games in that week, but it still ended in a draw. Batting first, Durham - still without their English and Australian internationals - made 73 for 4 into a final total of 334, Northamptonshire bowler Damien Wright trailing off after three early wickets, and the seventh-wicket partnership of Ashley Noffke and Phil Mustard could add 135. Dale Benkenstein got four wickets for 29 in the Northamptonshire effort, while David Sales top-scored with 50 not out, but they were still bowled out for 214 - trailing by 120. Durham scored at three runs an over on the third day - although they added 86 in 17 fourth-day overs - as captain Benkenstein boosted his own average with 83 not out off 150 balls. Northamptonshire were set 414 in 70 overs, and despite two wickets from Gareth Breese as Northamptonshire lost four wickets for 35 after an opening stand of 89, neither team could force a win and the game was drawn. (Cricinfo scorecard)

==== National League: Sussex v Durham (19 June) ====
Sussex (4pts) beat Durham (0pts) by seven wickets

Durham Dynamos lost by seven wickets in the top-of-the-table clash at Arundel against Sussex Sharks. Dale Benkenstein won the toss and chose to have his Durham side bat first, as he made 57 not out from number five, but Durham still lost their last seven wickets for 66 to be 195 all out. James Kirtley was the main culprit with four for 29 but every Sussex bowler except Robin Martin-Jenkins got among the wickets. In reply, Ian Ward hit 93 off 75 balls, Chris Adams took 58 off 49, and Liam Plunkett was plundered for 46 off his four overs - including nine wides. In 29.3 of a possible 45 overs, the match was over, Sussex getting a bit of Twenty20 practice in as they closed the gap at the top of the table to two points. (Cricinfo scorecard)

=== Twenty20 Cup - Group Stage ===
Durham Dynamos failed to live up to the expectations their top-of-the-table position in both Division Two of the Championship and Division Two of the League into wins in the Twenty20 Cup, as they trailed off after ending June with two wins and two losses. They failed to win a single of their next four matches, and finished fifth out of six teams in the group - only ahead of later county champions Nottinghamshire.

==== Derbyshire v Durham (22 June) ====
Derbyshire (2pts) beat Durham (0pts) by six wickets

Durham Dynamos had lost two of 17 League and Championship games before they entered the Twenty20 game, while Derbyshire Phantoms had won two from 14. Nevertheless, the Phantoms recorded a victory with fourteen balls to spare against a Durham team lacking batsmen Paul Collingwood and Michael Hussey. Batting first, Durham made 130 for 7, Kevin Dean taking two for 20 and Andre Botha two for 16, both from a full quota of four overs. Gordon Muchall was the only batsman to pass 20 for the Dynamos. In reply, James Bryant top-scored with 53 not out off 46 balls, Jonathan Moss slashed eight boundaries in his 46, and two fours and a two from Botha sent them to 134 for 4 with 14 balls to spare with only Nathan Astle conceding less than six an over, taking two for 14. (Cricinfo scorecard)

==== Leicestershire v Durham (26 June) ====
Leicestershire (2pts) beat Durham (0pts) by three runs

Durham Dynamos lost their second game in succession, having bowled first and taken nine Leicestershire Foxes wickets, while their opponents made 150 runs. Economical bowling from Dale Benkenstein, who took two for 17, made that possible, but he scored at a strike rate 22 points below the required, hitting 18 off 17 balls, while as Charl Willoughby and Jeremy Snape took wickets and refused to give him runs Gareth Breese hit 16 not out off 8 balls, and Gordon Muchall 38 not out off 30, but they couldn't carry Durham all the way, and they finished four runs short of victory. (Cricinfo scorecard)

==== Durham v Nottinghamshire (28 June) ====
Durham (2pts) beat Nottinghamshire (0pts) by six wickets

Durham Dynamos recorded their first win of their Twenty20 campaign with a last-over six-wicket win at Riverside. Mark Ealham had some fun with Durham bowler Neil Killeen as he thumped six sixes in a 17-ball 45, and his 73-run partnership with Chris Read threatened to lift Nottinghamshire Outlaws to a much bigger score than their final 179, as they were 154 for 5 midway through the 18th over. However, four wickets in two overs from Jamaican-born Gareth Breese helped set them back, although Will Smith hit two fours in a six-ball 13. In reply, Nathan Astle and Gordon Muchall both made 64 - the latter a not out - and Ealham was smashed about, conceding 51 runs in four overs. Andrew Harris conceded runs at an even higher rate, with 38 off 15 legitimate deliveries as Benkenstein took runs off him and Durham won with three balls to spare. (Cricinfo scorecard)

==== Yorkshire v Durham (30 June) ====
Durham (2pts) beat Yorkshire (0pts) by two wickets

Durham Dynamos won the game at Headingley, where the average run rate was below 6.5, as both these sides were tied in third place two points behind the group leaders. Yorkshire Phoenix were sent in to bat, and lost their first three wickets for 12 runs. Durham captain Dale Benkenstein bowled himself for two overs to take three wickets for 10, and Yorkshire's eventual total was 123 for 7, despite a total of 10 extras. Matthew Hoggard and Tim Bresnan then took three quick wickets between them to reduce Durham to 15 for 3, but despite eight wickets falling in the Durham innings, Phil Mustard's 31 and an identical score from No. 8 Gary Scott was enough to lift them to 124 for 8 with an over remaining. (Cricinfo scorecard)

==== Durham v Leicestershire (1 July) ====
Leicestershire (2pts) beat Durham (0pts) by 32 runs

Last year's champions Leicestershire Foxes were back on track for the quarter-finals with their fourth win of the campaign, thanks to 73 from John Sadler at the Riverside Ground. Sadler's 72-run second-wicket partnership with skipper HD Ackerman lifted the visitors to 154 for 7. Durham Dynamos failed to hit quickly enough to win, however, as Nicky Peng's top-score of 37 was off 41 balls - a strike rate 38 points below the required 129.16 to win. Despite captain Dale Benkenstein hitting 33 not out off 16 deliveries, it did not help, as Durham's total was 122 for 7. (Cricinfo scorecard)

==== Lancashire v Durham (3 July) ====
Lancashire (2pts) beat Durham (0pts) by 37 runs

Mal Loye and Brad Hodge helped Lancashire Lightning to recover after Stuart Law was stumped in the second over off Durham Dynamos medium-pacer Neil Killeen. Loye and Hodge paired up for 169 for the second wicket, as Loye became the second Lancastrian to score a Twenty20 century this season before he was eventually caught off Nathan Astle's bowling for 100. Lancashire closed on 208 for 4, and only Killeen conceded less than 30 runs of Durham's six bowlers. Astle got the best bowling figures, with two for 37, but his batting helped little - 55 off 37 balls was a run rate of 8.9, 1.6 runs per over below the required rate to win. When Durham realised that, they tried to lash out, and as a result, wickets tumbled to Glen Chapple and Dominic Cork. Durham thus finished their 20 overs with the score on 171 for 7. (Cricinfo scorecard)

==== Durham v Yorkshire (4 July) ====
Yorkshire (2pts) beat Durham (0pts) by 40 runs

Yorkshire Phoenix got their first win in three Twenty20 games, but they still needed to win their last game and Derbyshire lose their last to have a chance of qualifying for the quarter-finals. Batting first, Ian Harvey, Craig White and Phil Jaques all made scores between 40 and 60, to lift Yorkshire to 126 for 1 at one point. Off-spinner Gary Scott and medium-pacer Dale Benkenstein took three wickets between them, and Yorkshire closed on 171 for 7. Durham Dynamos looked in the game when Benkenstein and Gordon Muchall were at the crease, pairing up for 79 for the fourth wicket, but a burst of wickets - thanks to Richard Dawson and Anthony McGrath's bowling - sent Durham to 111 for 8, needing 60y for the last two wickets. 12 minutes later, the innings was over for 131, with 17 deliveries remaining. Yorkshire's 30-year-old seam bowler Adam Warren took two for 32 on Twenty20 debut. (Cricinfo scorecard)

==== Durham v Lancashire (6 July) ====
Match abandoned; Durham (1pt), Lancashire (1pt)

As Lancashire Lightning were already through and Durham Dynamos already knocked out of the Twenty20 Cup, the rain at the Riverside Ground mattered little to the outcome of the Twenty20 Cup group stages. Both sides shared a point in the game. (Cricinfo scorecard)

=== July ===
Durham came back from the Twenty20 Cup to play a Championship match against Lancashire and fell to their first defeat of the season - which was also the highest margin of defeat thus far in the County Championship, beating Durham's innings-and-216-run win over Leicestershire three months earlier. Meanwhile, they lost their National League lead without playing a game, as Sussex Sharks beat Kent Spitfires to go top - and six days later, when Durham had the chance to go past Sussex again, they lost to Warwickshire in a game featuring less than 300 runs in total. Durham rounded off the month with three matches without loss, however, as they beat Derbyshire in the League and Somerset in the Championship to have a 24.5-point lead at the end of the month. In the League, however, Warwickshire overtook them as they fell to third place.

==== County Championship: Durham v Lancashire (8–11 July) ====
Lancashire (22pts) beat Durham (1pt) by an innings and 228 runs

Durham still lacked Michael Hussey, Paul Collingwood and Steve Harmison, and finally some opponents exposed that, as Durham suffered not only their first loss, but the largest loss in the entire Division Two this season - beating their own win over Leicestershire by an innings and 216 runs. Their replacements contributed, as Nathan Astle made 81 runs, Jonathan Lewis 36 and Ashley Noffke took two wickets for 89, but Lancashire still dominated. After winning the toss, Durham made 167 against Lancashire's bowling - James Anderson and Dominic Cork took two each, Glen Chapple and Gary Keedy three. Then, Mal Loye outscored all of Durham with a 200, and Dominic Cork an unbeaten 104 to give Lancashire a 363-run lead on first innings. Chapple then took four for 18, as Durham were bowled out for an even lower second-innings score of 135 - leaving them losers by an innings and 228 runs, though they retained their lead in the County Championship. (Cricinfo scorecard)

==== National League: Durham v Warwickshire (17 July) ====
Warwickshire (4pts) beat Durham (0pts) by five wickets

Durham Dynamos failed to take advantage of winning the toss and batting against Warwickshire Bears. On a poor pitch, Warwickshire bowlers Heath Streak, Dougie Brown and Neil Carter took full advantage - the latter two bowling a total of nine maiden overs, while Streak took three for 13 before breaking down with an injury. Durham were 49 for 8 before Liam Plunkett and Neil Killeen chipped in with low scores, staying in for 27 and 36 balls respectively, while Dale Benkenstein made 90 off 105 balls at the other end - over 60 per cent of Durham's total of 147. However, Benkenstein's effort was not enough - despite Ashley Noffke taking two early wickets, Alex Loudon anchored the chase with 51 off 61 deliveries, and Warwickshire batted to 148 for 5 with over ten overs remaining. (Cricinfo scorecard)

==== National League: Derbyshire v Durham (20 July) ====
Durham (4pts) beat Derbyshire (0pts) by six wickets

Derbyshire Phantoms were set back initially by three wickets from 22-year-old Graham Onions and that prevented them running away to a score higher than their eventual 223 for 8. Travis Friend made 52 and Graeme Welch only taking 24 balls for his unbeaten 37. After opener Nicky Peng had been dismissed for 15 off 29 balls, Durham Dynamos were guided to the target by 97 from Michael Hussey and 70 from Gordon Muchall. An extra won them the game with eight balls to spare. (Cricinfo scorecard)

==== County Championship: Derbyshire v Durham (21–24 July) ====
Durham (11pts) drew with Derbyshire (7pts)

Paul Collingwood made a first-innings 190 - 52% of the Durham total - on his return to County Championship cricket following his stint with the England ODI team in the NatWest Series. However, Derbyshire's second highest score of the season, and rain cutting off about 80 overs of the match, resulted in the match in a draw. The hosts had taken three early Durham wickets for 59 after being put in the field, but Collingwood and skipper Dale Benkenstein lifted Durham with a 250-run partnership - to 309 for 4. However, Derbyshire did get some kind of revenge - five wickets fell for nine runs by the end of the day, as Durham were 363 for 9 at stumps, and only eight runs were taken before the last wicket fell on the second day. Durham took wickets as well, though, as Mark Davies got three wickets for four runs, including Michael di Venuto for 32, and Liam Plunkett also took three wickets as Derbyshire made 161 in 41.1 overs.

Asked to follow on, di Venuto took 113 balls for his second-innings century, but batted more slowly after that as Derbyshire began to build a lead with a 252-run stand between di Venuto and Hassan Adnan. A brief spurt of wickets, initiated by di Venuto departing for 203, saw Durham lose four men for six runs to go to 360 for 6, but Travis Friend and Graeme Welch made 135 in a seventh-wicket partnership as Derbyshire set a target of 330. After Durham had batted out 36 of their 66 overs, scoring 93 runs and losing two wickets to spinner Ant Botha, play was stopped and the match declared a draw due to poor weather conditions. (Cricinfo scorecard)

==== County Championship: Somerset v Durham (26–29 July) ====
Durham (22pts) beat Somerset (5pts) by 207 runs

Durham recorded their sixth and last Championship win of the season after Paul Collingwood made two centuries, while Somerset lost nine men in single figures, including their batsmen from four to seven in the second innings. Collingwood made 181, for his second successive match with a century, and as Mike Hussey, Gordon Muchall and Gareth Breese made half-centuries Durham declared on 476 for 9 seven overs into day three after the second day had been shortened from 104 to 32 overs by the rain. Jamaican spinner Gareth Breese then snared five for 83 as Somerset made their way to 303 in 68 overs, while Durham got to 208 for 1 in reply before declaring for the second time in the match - with only Graeme Smith getting a wicket for Somerset. Once again, Collingwood made a century, this time an unbeaten 105, to have a July batting average of 162.66. Smith started by adding 56 with fellow opener James Francis, but Breese dismissed Smith and a further three to his tally as he finished with match figures of nine for 138. Ian Blackwell scored 8 at a strike rate of just under 13, compared to his average strike rate of nearly 80 for the season -, but he was eventually lbw to Michael Lewis, and Somerset were bowled out 41 overs into the fourth day to lose by 207 runs. (Cricinfo scorecard)

=== August ===
Durham's first match in August was also their last Championship match that they did not draw - a two-wicket loss to Essex at Southend-on-Sea, and they followed that up with a loss to Bangladesh A and a draw with Leicestershire for a three-match winless streak. It was broken on 16 August, however, as Durham beat Leicestershire in the National League to go second in the table, two points behind Sussex Sharks. The Sharks lost on 21 August, and Durham had the chance to take the lead, but they lost to Somerset Sabres at Taunton to fall down to third again. A Championship draw with Yorkshire followed - where a total of 16 wickets fell - to leave Durham six points ahead of second-placed Lancashire at the end of the month, but the Lancastrians had a game in hand. August ended with a win over Scottish Saltires, though, and Durham were second in the National League - ten points behind the Sharks, but with two games in hand.

==== County Championship: Essex v Durham (3–6 August) ====
Essex (18pts) beat Durham (3pts) by two wickets

Durham won the toss at Southend-on-Sea, and their first innings lasted two sessions for 196, New Zealander Andre Adams taking five for 60 while Danish Kaneria took three for 30 for Essex. Essex also lost five wickets on the first day, to trail by 89, and as Tony Palladino and James Middlebrook were dismissed in quick succession Durham were 62 behind with three wickets in hand, with Australian Michael Lewis having taken four for 69. However, opener Alastair Cook was still there, and he was eventually last out after batting for four and a half hours, crafting 107 as Essex made it to 245 and a lead of 49. Adams dug out both openers when Durham returned to bat, but four partnerships of more than 40 - the highest between Dale Benkenstein and Gareth Breese, who added 92 - saw Durham to a first-innings total of 347, as captain Benkenstein top-scored with 124.

Essex needed 299 to win, and had four sessions to do it. They lost Ravinder Bopara after 12 minutes, caught off Liam Plunkett, but Andy Flower and Alastair Cook forged a 72-run partnership before Durham medium-pacer Mark Davies struck and had Cook caught behind. At stumps on day three, Essex were 129 for 2. Lewis and Gareth Breese did a lot of bowling for Durham on the fourth day, totalling 65.1 of Durham's total of 100.1 overs, and after Ronnie Irani departed for 48, Durham limited the Essex partnerships to no more than 25. Andy Flower stood tall, however, spending six and a half hours at the crease to end with 132 not out - and his eighth-wicket partnership of 25 saw Essex cut the target to 10. Palladino hung in there with Flower, contributing a single, and Essex won by two wickets. (Cricinfo scorecard)

==== Tour Match: Durham v Bangladesh A (7 August) ====
Bangladesh A won by 86 runs

147 from Shahriar Nafees and Nazimuddin's seven-ball 28 - which included three sixes, two fours and a two before he was caught and bowled off Ben Harmison - lifted Bangladesh A to 299 for 6 in 50 overs, despite Neil Killeen removing Tushar Imran and Alok Kapali with successive balls mid-innings. Nafees had added 209 with Mehrab Hossain for the first wicket. Durham started with a 40-run opening partnership, but Syed Rasel and Shahadat Hossain both took two wickets with successive balls, separated by a few overs. Shahadat went on to take four for 34, while Australian Callum Thorp top-scored with 52 - in vain, as Durham posted 213. Durham's captain and opener James Lowe ground out 36 runs from 80 deliveries, well short of the required run rate of 6 per over. (Cricinfo scorecard)

==== County Championship: Durham v Leicestershire (12–15 August) ====
Leicestershire (12pts) drew with Durham (10pts)

Rain intervened on both the first two days at Riverside, limiting play to 56.1 overs, compared to the expected 200 on fine days, and there was little time left to get a result. Durham made 260 for 3 on the first two days amid the rain, however, Michael Hussey hitting five sixes in his third Championship century of the season, as he made 146 runs. David Masters then completed a six-wicket-haul on the third day as Durham lost their last seven wickets for 55 runs to end with a first-innings total of 315. In reply, Liam Plunkett took two wickets inside the first hour and a half, but Dinesh Mongia's unbeaten 77 saw Leicestershire to stumps on day three - still trailing by 98 runs with seven wickets in hand. Leicestershire batted on for 50 overs on day four, Gareth Breese taking five for 91 as Leicestershire were bowled out for 443, while Mongia notched up 29 boundaries in his only first-class century of the season, finishing with 164 before he was stumped off Breese. With 50 overs remaining and one innings to go for both sides, Durham decided to bat out the time, Hussey boosting his batting average with 61 not out. (Cricinfo scorecard)

==== National League: Durham v Leicestershire (16 August) ====
Durham (4pts) beat Leicestershire (0pts) by eight wickets

Durham Dynamos played their first one-day game for nearly a month, and beat the Leicestershire Foxes to go four points ahead of them in the table. Michael Lewis took four for 13 as Leicestershire made 113 at Riverside, with only Darren Robinson passing 20. Neil Killeen and Liam Plunkett also chipped in for Durham, taking two wickets each. Paul Collingwood then hit 51 not out in 38 balls from number three to guide Durham to the target with 18.4 overs and eight wickets to spare, sending Durham up to second place and Leicestershire out of the promotion zone into fourth place. (Cricinfo scorecard)

==== National League: Somerset v Durham (21 August) ====
Somerset (4pts) beat Durham (0pts) by five wickets

Durham Dynamos failed to take the opportunity of taking a lead in Division Two of the National League, as they went down by five wickets at Taunton. Having won the toss, Durham's opening batsman Gavin Hamilton recorded 22 off 51 balls, while Somerset's 18-year-old Robert Woodman bowling two maiden overs. However, Dale Benkenstein made an unbeaten 60 and Gareth Breese 28 off 16 balls as Durham made their way to 222 for 7 in 45 overs, William Durston getting the best figures for Somerset Sabres with two for 32 - admittedly in five overs - while South African Charl Langeveldt took two for 33 in nine overs. The Sabres added 85 in the first hour before Durham got a wicket, with Matthew Wood continuing on his good run of form as he made 76. After Gareth Breese and Neil Killeen had taken a couple of wickets, and Somerset were 143 for 5, Keith Parsons and Durston added 83 runs for the sixth wicket to guide Somerset home. (Cricinfo scorecard)

==== County Championship: Yorkshire v Durham (24–27 August) ====
Yorkshire (12pts) drew with Durham (11pts)

Michael Hussey (85 not out on day 1) and Paul Collingwood (33 not out) led Durham to a total of 140 for 1 against the Yorkshire bowlers in the 40 overs possible on the first day at Scarborough. Deon Kruis and Tim Bresnan got one wicket each in the morning, dismissing Hussey and Collingwood respectively, but Durham fought back with Gordon Muchall and Dale Benkenstein adding 157 for the fourth wicket. Durham were eventually bowled out midway through day three, having made a total of 414. Kruis took five wickets and Bresnan four, but they both conceded more than 100 runs in the process. Yorkshire opted for batting practice, batting out the last day and a half to make 475 for 6, with Paul Jaques scoring 172. Paul Collingwood took three for 56 for Durham, but could not help them to an extra bowling point, and with no possibility of taking the third extra point Durham's captain Hussey agreed to a draw after Yorkshire's 129th over. (Cricinfo scorecard)

==== National League: Durham v Scotland (28 August) ====
Durham (4pts) beat Scotland (0pts) by 93 runs

Harare-born all-rounder Ryan Watson put in the best all-round effort for Scotland all season, recording Scotland's fourth-highest score of the season with 86 and the best bowling analysis with four for 36, but none of the other Scots save Paul Hoffmann (conceding 21 runs in nine overs) took more than one wicket, conceded less than four an over, or made more than 20 runs. Thus, Durham Dynamos ran away with a 93-run victory. Batting first, Durham made 227 for 7, Gordon Muchall top-scoring with 79 and Gareth Breese upping the scoring-rate with two sixes in an unbeaten 47 off 39 balls near the end. The Scots then lost six wickets for 54 before Watson and Craig Wright added 77 for the seventh wicket. The run out of Wright precipitated another loss of wickets, though, as the last four wickets fell for three runs and Scotland were all out for 134. (Cricinfo scorecard)

=== September ===
Durham played their last match against Derbyshire in the Championship, and Derbyshire made 277 of the required 280 fourth-innings runs in a drawn game. They then moved closer to promotion in the National League with an eight-wicket victory at home over Kent, and a week later they beat yorkshire by seven wickets, to secure promotion into the first division of the League with two weeks to spare. Promotion in the Championship was secured on 17 September, when Durham drew their game with Northamptonshire - their final game of the season, and their fourth draw of the season. They led the table before the last round, but Lancashire drew the final game and took the Division Two title. Durham kept their quest for the Division Two title in the National League up with wins over Somerset and Warwickshire, but as Sussex won their final games as well Durham found the gap too large to bridge, and ended in second place in the League as well.

==== County Championship: Durham v Derbyshire (30 August-2 September) ====
Derbyshire (10pts) drew with Durham (8pts)

Derbyshire medium pacer Ian Hunter, formerly of Durham, got career-best bowling figures of five for 63 as Derbyshire - the only winless team in the Championship so far this season - came three runs away from recording a win at Riverside Ground against the table-toppers from Durham. In Durham's first innings, where Hunter got his five-for, nine batsmen reached double figures, yet only two passed 30 and no one made it to fifty, as Dale Benkenstein top-scored with 49. Liam Plunkett dug out one wicket in the first evening and one on the second morning, as Derbyshire lost their first four for 64, but a 231-minute partnership between Jon Moss (92 runs) and Chris Bassano (87) yielded 148 runs to take Derbyshire within 18 of Durham's first-innings total of 230. Luke Sutton hit 55 off 119 balls, and Derbyshire made their way to 326 in 112.4 overs.

Australian opener Jimmy Maher recorded his second successive single-figure score in his first match for Durham, as the hosts made it 59 for 3, but centuries from Paul Collingwood and Dale Benkenstein sent them back in the lead. The pair added 206 runs together before Collingwood was out for 112 - his sixth first-class century in twelve matches - while Benkenstein continued to 162 not out, adding 80 runs with Gareth Breese and 21 for the ninth wicket with Brad Williams before declaring. The declaration set Derbyshire 280 to win in 66 overs, and Michael di Venuto and Steve Stubbings put on 91 for the first wicket to cut that down to 189. They had used two hours to hit those 91, though, leaving two hours for the remaining 189 - and though Stubbings completed his century, the rest of the batting order could not quite hit quite quickly enough, and they finished on 277 for 6 - three runs short of victory. (Cricinfo scorecard)

==== National League: Durham v Kent (4 September) ====
Durham (4pts) beat Kent (0pts) by eight wickets

Kent Spitfires had their run of three successive victories broken by Durham Dynamos, never recovering from their initial position at two runs for three wickets after ducks from James Tredwell, Joe Denly and Darren Stevens. Michael Carberry, who came in with the score 27 for 4, made 63 with ten fours, but no other batsman passed 30, and Neil Killeen and Gareth Breese shared the last five wickets as Kent posted 140. Gavin Hamilton, who made 43, and Jimmy Maher with 70 shared an opening stand of 123, and despite two wickets from Tredwell, Durham made it home in under two-thirds of the allotted overs. (Cricinfo scorecard)

==== National League: Yorkshire v Durham (11 September) ====
Durham (4pts) beat Yorkshire (0pts) by seven wickets

Gordon Muchall's maiden List A century, an unbeaten 101 off 107 balls, boosted Durham Dynamos to their third straight one-day victory and promotion from Division Two. It was Yorkshire Phoenix who batted first, however, and fifties from Michael Lumb and Anthony McGrath - who had just come off making 238 runs in a Championship game with Worcestershire - gave them a total of 237 for 6 in 45 overs, despite Callum Thorp bowling his seven overs for 22 runs. Yorkshire got a wicket in the first half-hour, having Gavin Hamilton caught for 5, but without Tim Bresnan and Deon Kruis, Yorkshire struggled to take wickets, and Durham won with ten balls to spare. (Cricinfo scorecard)

==== County Championship: Durham v Northamptonshire (14–17 September) ====
Northamptonshire (12pts) drew with Durham (8pts)

Durham needed a draw in this match to secure promotion from Division Two of the County Championship, and the weather helped them, cutting off nearly two days of play. Northamptonshire went for the victory, declaring both their innings closed, but Durham hung on to take eight points. Centuries from Usman Afzaal and Riki Wessels, along with 84 from Rob White had lifted the visitors to 414 for 7 on the first day, despite Durham pacer Liam Plunkett grabbing five for 84 and after the second day was washed out they declared.

Northamptonshire broke through in the third over, Damien Wright dismissing Jimmy Maher lbw for 0, and Wright got a further three wickets as Durham were 115 for 6 at one point. Gareth Breese and Plunkett saw out the remainder of the day, though, but Durham still needed 93 to avoid the follow on. Andrew Crook eventually broke the partnership, as Durham lost three wickets for 15 runs to go to 224 for 9, but resistance from number 11 Brad Williams saw him add 56 with Breese to take Durham six runs past the follow-on target of 264. Northamptonshire set about making quick runs, and lost seven wickets in the process, Callum Thorp taking three for ten as the visitors declared after having made 101 in 21 overs. Northamptonshire set Durham 246 to win, and got a good start when Damien Wright had Jimmy Maher bowled for 2, but Durham saw out 15 overs before rain set in and forced the game into a draw. (Cricinfo scorecard)

==== National League: Durham v Somerset (18 September) ====
Durham (4pts) beat Somerset (0pts) by five wickets

Durham Dynamos bowled first, and their seam bowlers Neil Killeen and Paul Collingwood got three wickets each against the Somerset Sabres at the Riverside Ground. Seven Somerset batsmen were caught, as Somerset lost their first nine wickets for 94, before Wesley Durston and Simon Francis added a 46-run last-wicket partnership. Killeen conceded 15 runs in his nine overs. Durston also took two for 21 following his 46 with the bat, but 40 from Gordon Muchall saw Durham to the target with nearly 15 overs to spare, giving them promotion in the National League as well - their second promotion of the week. (Cricinfo scorecard)

==== National League: Warwickshire v Durham (25 September) ====
Durham (4pts) beat Warwickshire (0pts) by eight wickets (D/L Method)

Early wickets and few runs early on meant that Warwickshire Bears posted 187 for 8 at their home ground, Edgbaston. Australian Brad Williams took two wickets for the Durham Dynamos, as Warwickshire lost their first four wickets for 43, and despite a run-a-ball 48 from number 8 Dougie Brown, Warwickshire never got the run rate up above 4.5 an over. Durham lost Gordon Muchall for 3, but half-centuries from Australian Jimmy Maher and England all-rounder Paul Collingwood put Durham to a score of 135 for 2, and Durham passed the revised target of 154 with 17 balls to spare. (Cricinfo scorecard)

== Statistics ==
=== First-class cricket ===
==== Most runs ====
Qualification: 750 runs

Durham County Cricket Club in 2005 - leading batsmen by first-class runs scored
Name	Mat	Inns	NO	Runs	HS	100	50	Ave
Dale Benkenstein	17	25	4	1236	162*	4	5	58.85
Paul Collingwood	13	23	3	1103	190	6	0	55.15
Mike Hussey	10	18	4	1074	253	3	5	76.71
Gordon Muchall	17	29	4	764	123	1	3	30.56

==== Most wickets ====
Qualification: 30 wickets

Derbyshire County Cricket Club in 2005 - leading bowlers by first class wickets taken
Name	Overs	Mdns	Runs	Wkts	BBI	Ave	SR	ER
Liam Plunkett	423	80	1573	51	5-43	30.84	49.7	3.71
Mark Davies	296.4	94	810	49	6-32	16.53	36.3	2.73
Gareth Breese	332.1	61	1080	31	5-83	34.83	64.2	3.25

=== List-A cricket ===
==== Most runs ====
Qualification: 300 runs

Derbyshire County Cricket Club in 2005 - leading batsmen by List-A runs scored
Name	Mat	Inns	NO	Runs	HS	100	50	Ave
Gordon Muchall	15	15	5	483	101*	1	3	48.30
Dale Benkenstein	18	14	5	440	90	0	4	48.88
Paul Collingwood	15	15	5	371	82	0	3	37.10
Mike Hussey	10	10	0	309	97	0	2	30.90

==== Most wickets ====
Qualification: 15 wickets

Derbyshire County Cricket Club in 2005 - leading bowlers by List-A wickets taken
Name	Overs	Mdns	Runs	Wkts	BBI	Ave	SR	ER
Neil Killeen	148	16	566	26	3-15	21.76	34.1	3.82
Liam Plunkett	117	9	553	19	4-28	29.10	36.9	4.72
Gareth Breese	101.5	4	479	18	3-30	26.61	33.9	4.70
