= Twenty20 in England in 2005 =

Twenty20 cricket is played over 20 overs according to normal limited-over rules, the one exception being the rule for "timed out", where the time by which an incoming batsman must be at the crease ready to receive his first ball is reduced to 90 seconds after the outgoing batsman has been dismissed. This amendment to the rules helps speed up the game. Additionally, boundary ropes tend to be shorter in Twenty20 cricket than for normal limited over games.

2005 marks the third running of the Twenty20 Cup, which was won by Somerset when they beat Lancashire at the Oval on 30 July. It also saw England play their first Twenty20 International against Australia at the Rose Bowl in Southampton, and winning by 100 runs (see below).

There was also a further development, as Leicestershire won approval from the England and Wales Cricket Board to host an International Twenty20 competition at the end of the season, although they are having to call it 20:20 to get round trademark issues. It will be competed over 15, 16 and 17 September between Leicestershire Foxes, Somerset Sabres, Nashua Titans, a Lashings World XI, the PCA Masters and the Asian XI.

== Australian tour ==
=== PCA Masters XI v Australians (9 June) ===
The Australians beat the PCA Masters XI by 8 wickets

The 2005 Ashes tour started with the Australians taking on a Professional Cricketers' Association eleven at the picturesque ground at Arundel in a Twenty20 game. A crowd of 11,000 turned up to see the tourists win with one ball to spare, although in practice the result was always clear after an opening partnership of 131 between Adam Gilchrist and Matthew Hayden. The Aussies got an ideal start as Stephen Fleming edged Brett Lee's first delivery to the slips and the Masters XI were 0 for 1, having been put in to bat by Australia. Darren Maddy made 70 in 57 balls and Paul Collingwood (38) and Mark Ealham (39) also scored runs, but the rest of the team made little impression as the PCA Masters XI made 167 for 6. The Aussies lost only two wickets in making their target. (Cricinfo scorecard)

=== England v Australia (13 June) ===
England
179/8 (20 overs)
England won by 100 runs

PD Collingwood 46 (26)
GD McGrath 3–31 [4]

Rose Bowl, Southampton, England
Umpires: NJ Llong (Eng) and JW Lloyds (Eng)
Man of the Match: KP Pietersen (Eng)

Australia
79 (14.3 overs)

JN Gillespie 24 (18)
J Lewis 4–24 [4]

England started cautiously in the only Twenty20 International against Australia at the Rose Bowl, only hitting six runs off the first two overs as they saw off the bowlers, but Geraint Jones then decided to have fun with Brett Lee. Hitting two boundaries off the next over, Lee was hit for 14, and England moved rapidly to 28 for no loss before Jones cut McGrath to deep third man, where Kasprowicz took a catch on the boundary – out for 19 with four fours. Marcus Trescothick hit a single to end the over, but England were happy enough with 29 for 1 after four overs. Lee's next over was, again, hit for 14, as Lee served up one wide and a no-ball to end with three overs for 31 as singles were taken off every ball. That prompted a bowling change, with Michael Kasprowicz coming on for Australia, and with good reward, as the penultimate ball of his over was caught by Symonds at midwicket – Andrew Flintoff out for 6. Kevin Pietersen managed to scamper a single, and after six overs, England were 50 for 2.

With Jason Gillespie coming on, England continued to take the singles, although the fielding restrictions were off and Australia could stop more of those. However, Michael Clarke at deep backward point handed England three runs in the seventh over with a misfield. Pietersen continued to dominate the Australian bowling, smashing a four and a two off Gillespie, as England took ten runs off the eighth over. Australia looked clueless – a rare sight – as they continued to give runs away through misfields, and Kevin Pietersen smashed his way to 33 not out off 16 balls – after ten overs, England were 93 for 2, and looking to set a massive target.

The Australian captain Ricky Ponting brought on part-time spinner Michael Clarke to bowl the eleventh over, and got immediate success, when Pietersen launched him to Matthew Hayden on the fifth ball, but England were still 101 for 3 after eleven overs. In the next over, the new batsman Michael Vaughan edged Andrew Symonds' ball to midwicket, and the pressure was suddenly on the English. With Trescothick out for 41 a bit later to an attempted sweep off Symonds, England were suddenly looking down a hole after a fine start, and Andrew Strauss and Paul Collingwood slowed the scoring, to see England 111 for 5 with six overs to play. However, a slog sweep from Collingwood to end the fifteenth over turned the match again, as it went away for six and England moved to 124 for 5. With Jason Gillespie being brought back, Collingwood led the charge, as England stole seventeen runs off the seventeenth over and wrought control of the game again. Despite Andrew Strauss being bowled by Gillespie for 18, Collingwood hit another two boundaries towards the end of the over, to move onto 42 not out and the team score to 167 for 6. Vikram Solanki was out in the next over for 9, caught by Hussey off McGrath, and on the last ball, Collingwood was caught by for 46. Still, England would be pleased with 179 for 8, the highest score on the Rose Bowl in Twenty20 matches.

Australia started shakily, with Adam Gilchrist playing-and-missing and edging one shot over Andrew Strauss at third man, who miscued the path of the ball, as the Australians got eight off the first over bowled by Darren Gough. With Gilchrist finally taking one liberty too many, an easy catch was given, and Kevin Pietersen took it to remove arguably the most dangerous batsman in this format. On the next ball, Hayden was out, caught by Pietersen for 6. Symonds survived the next ball, but odds had improved for England, as the visitors were now 23 for 2. What followed was an Australian collapse – Michael Clarke went for a golden duck to Lewis, a slightly dubious decision, but that gave the English the needed momentum. Within the next four overs, Australia had lost four more wickets for eight runs, Symonds for 0, Hussey for 1, Ponting for 0, Martyn for 4, and despite a recovery from Jason Gillespie and Brett Lee, the required run rate ran away to 12 an over from the last eleven overs. Jon Lewis finished his spell with four wickets for 24 – a special international debut, even though it was only in a Twenty20 game. Despite a good recovery and a partnership of 36, Gillespie eventually holed out a catch to Marcus Trescothick off the hero of the match, Paul Collingwood, and England headed even further towards a victory. Eventually, McGrath was bowled by Harmison, ending the innings for 79 all out – exactly the same score that England succumbed to in the fourth innings chase against the Australians in the first Test of the last Ashes. (Cricinfo scorecard)

== Tsunami Relief game ==
=== Asian XI v International XI (20 June) ===
International XI won by six wickets

Despite South African international Shaun Pollock only bowling two of a possible four overs, Brian Lara again using plenty of bowlers as captain of the International XI, the Asia XI were bowled out for 157 thanks to patient bowling from the retired Adam Hollioake, who took three for 16 – the three wickets being a hat-trick of Rahul Dravid, Chaminda Vaas and Anil Kumble. Former Australian batsman Greg Blewett then smashed five sixes in a massive 91 not out, and with good help from Scott Styris who made 39 not out from number six, the International XI won by six wickets. (Cricinfo scorecard)

== Twenty20 Cup ==
=== Matchday one ===
==== Sussex v Essex (22 June) ====
Sussex (2pts) beat Essex (0pts) by nine wickets

Essex Eagles collapsed to lose their first match of the 2005 Twenty20 Cup to Sussex Sharks. Winning the toss and batting, Essex quickly made their way to 55 for 1, with Ronnie Irani hitting 34 off 18 balls. But two quick wickets set them back, Andy Flower was then run out, and Mushtaq Ahmed ended their innings with five for 11 from 21 deliveries – as Essex ended all out for 109. In a stately reply, Sussex did not hurry too much, as Matt Prior scored 66 off 50 balls, and 14 extras helped the Sharks past the target after 14.4 overs. (Cricinfo scorecard)

==== Kent v Surrey (22 June) ====
Surrey (2pts) beat Kent (0pts) by seven wickets

In front of a full house at Beckenham, Mohammad Akram of the visiting Surrey Lions served up a rare maiden in Twenty20 cricket as Kent Spitfires were tied down to 140 for 8 off their twenty overs, despite Martin van Jaarsveld scoring a fifty. James Benning then made batting easy for Surrey, scoring ten fours and two sixes in a crackling 66. Surrey eventually won comparatively easily, having four overs left when they reached 141 for 3. (Cricinfo scorecard)

==== Hampshire v Middlesex (22 June) ====
Middlesex (2pts) beat Hampshire (0pts) by 18 runs

Owais Shah made a good attempt at getting the highest strike-rate of the opening day of Twenty20 cricket, recording 72 runs off only 30 balls to lift Middlesex Crusaders to an unassailable 210 for 6. For Hampshire Hawks, Shane Warne showed somewhat poor captaincy when Zimbabwean all-rounder Sean Ervine was the eighth man to come on to bowl – and then took two for 13 from two overs. New Zealander Craig McMillan, meanwhile, conceded twenty-eight runs from his only over. Despite Nic Pothas scoring 59 off 39 balls, the Hawks were nowhere near keeping up with the required pace, and Middlesex bowler Irfan Pathan was a main cause of that – he took three for 16 from four overs, as Hampshire finished on 192 for 7. (Cricinfo scorecard)

==== Glamorgan v Somerset (22 June) ====
Glamorgan (2pts) beat Somerset (0pts) on losing fewer wickets

James Hildreth scored a quick 46 off 26 deliveries at Sophia Gardens as Somerset Sabres set a challenging target of 183 to Glamorgan Dragons. No Glamorgan bowler really had control over the Somerset batsmen, and yet they lost their wickets. A highlight of the innings was the effort of Somerset's No. 9 Gareth Andrew, who smashed three fours in his first three balls and then was bowled with the fourth. In reply, Glamorgan got to 126 for 2 before part-timers Keith Parsons and Hildreth got the better of them and took wickets at a leisure – however, Alex Wharf hung in there with Michael Powell and carried the Dragons to 183 for 8 after the 20 overs were up. The crowd seemed content with the one point and a tie, but the speaker informed the crowd of the actual result, which of course was pleasing to the home side. (Cricinfo scorecard)

==== Worcestershire v Warwickshire (22 June) ====
Worcestershire (2pts) beat Warwickshire (0pts) by one run

In the local battle at New Road, Worcestershire Royals eked out a victory over rivals Warwickshire Bears. Graeme Hick and Ben Smith both made big scores, with 67 and 47, and skipper Gareth Batty also made 21 to send Worcestershire to 177 for 7. Warwickshire then collapsed to accurate bowling, losing their entire top order except Jonathan Trott to end up on 68 for 5 – but Michael Powell made 40 not out batting at seven, turning the innings almost back to Warwickshire's favour. In the end, however, they were two runs short, their No. 11 Nick Warren only managing to hit one off the two balls he faced. (Cricinfo scorecard)

==== Northamptonshire v Gloucestershire (22 June) ====
Northamptonshire (2pts) beat Gloucestershire (0pts) by 81 runs

The Gloucestershire Gladiators took a massive beating by the Northamptonshire Steelbacks in their match at Milton Keynes. Despite Gloucestershire's Martyn Ball taking two for 18 from four overs, positively economical, five no-balls and the fact that 16 overs had to be found from bowlers other than Ball allowed Northamptonshire to run away to 224 for 5 – a Twenty20 Cup record . David Sales top-scored for the hosts with 78 not out, while Australian Damien Wright paired up with him for 84 for the sixth wicket, scoring an unbeaten 38 of his own. Gloucestershire were in trouble from the start, as opening batsman Craig Spearman was run out for a duck, and when Wright ripped out two more wickets, the Gladiators were 10 for three. Four wickets from Ben Phillips resulted in a serious collapse, as Gloucestershire were all out for 143. (Cricinfo scorecard)

==== Leicestershire v Nottinghamshire (22 June) ====
Leicestershire (2pts) beat Nottinghamshire (0pts) by five wickets

A disciplined bowling and fielding effort, conceding only five extras, was the key to Leicestershire Foxes' win at Grace Road. Nottinghamshire Outlaws won the toss and batted first, but after Nottinghamshire skipper Stephen Fleming found four boundaries in his twelve-ball 24, Jeremy Snape and Dinesh Mongia tied down the Nottinghamshire batsmen. Only Leicestershire seamer Darren Maddy, who bowled two overs for 33, gave the visitors' total score of 143 for 8 a glimmer of respect. The chase was close and exciting, however, as Leicestershire lost HD Ackerman and Maddy in succession to go to 16 for 2. At 103 for 5, things looked grim, but a crucial partnership between Paul Nixon and Ottis Gibson won them the game with four balls to spare. (Cricinfo scorecard)

==== Derbyshire v Durham (22 June) ====
Derbyshire (2pts) beat Durham (0pts) by six wickets

Durham Dynamos were the team to beat in 2005, and up to this game they had only lost two of 17 League and Championship games. Meanwhile, Derbyshire Phantoms had only won two from 14. Nevertheless, the Phantoms recorded a comparatively easy victory, as Durham's weak batting line-up was exposed. Batting first, they only made 130 for 7, Kevin Dean taking two for 20 and Andre Botha two for 16, both from a full quota of four overs. Gordon Muchall was the only batsman to pass 20 for the Dynamos. In reply, James Bryant top-scored with a calm 53 not out off 46 balls, Jonathan Moss slashed boundaries at will in his 46, and two fours and a two from Botha sent them to 134 for 4 with 14 balls to spare with only Nathan Astle in some control for Durham, taking two for 14. (Cricinfo scorecard)

==== Yorkshire v Lancashire (22 June) ====
Lancashire (2pts) beat Yorkshire (0pts) by five wickets

Phil Jaques, an Australian, was the dominant figure for the Yorkshire Phoenix in the Roses battle, scoring 72 from number three before being out to countryman Brad Hodge. That lifted the hosts to 165 for 7, but that was not enough to defend. Matthew Hoggard, the England Test bowler, showed an uncanny knack of being uneconomical, conceding 65 runs in his four overs, and despite two wickets he lost the game for the Phoenix. Brad Hodge ended with 64 not out for the visiting Lancashire Lightning as they won with seventeen balls to spare. (Cricinfo scorecard)

=== Matchday two ===
==== Surrey v Middlesex (23 June) ====
Surrey (2pts) beat Middlesex (0pts) by 23 runs

Surrey Lions recorded their second win from two matches in Twenty20 Cup cricket this season, ironic given their position at the very bottom of the 45-over National League. Ali Brown made 64 and David Thornely 67 not out as Middlesex Crusaders conceded too many runs at the fine batting track at Lord's, Surrey making 200 for 3. Owais Shah notched up his second score in the 70s in two days, taking 78 from 44 balls, and things looked good despite Shah leaving at 148 for 2. But Tim Murtagh changed all that. In four overs, he took six for 24, and with the help of David Thornely (three for 22) he ensured that Middlesex had seven batsmen out in single figures. They were bowled out for 177, with three balls remaining in the innings. (Cricinfo scorecard)

==== Essex v Kent (24 June) ====
Essex (2pts) beat Kent (0pts) by 29 runs

The match at Chelmsford was made into even more of a slog-effort by the English rain, as both sides were limited to 12 overs. Andy Flower made 46 off 29 balls, and 17 extras made the Essex Eagles run-rate exactly eleven an over. Defending 133, Essex got off to a good start as Antonio Palladino took two wickets, which stopped the visitors from massive smashing, and Kent Spitfires finished on 103 for 4 – thirty runs short of their winning target. (Cricinfo scorecard)

==== Hampshire v Sussex (24 June) ====
No result; Hampshire (1pt), Sussex (1pt)

Rain caused the match between Hampshire Hawks and Sussex Sharks to be abandoned. Despite the fact that a ball was not bowled, the match was declared a no-result since a toss was made. (Cricinfo scorecard)

==== Somerset v Worcestershire (23 June) ====
Somerset (2pts) beat Worcestershire (0pts) by 15 runs

Despite captain Graeme Smith becoming victim of Zander de Bruyn's bowling for just two runs, Somerset Sabres still posted a big target, thanks to Matthew Wood, who made 94 off only 35 balls before falling to Nadeem Malik six short of a century. Wood's smashing helped the Sabres to 210 for 6, although no other batsman passed 30. Graeme Hick tried to emulate Wood, but could only make 87 before Ian Blackwell got the better of him, and from then on Worcestershire never really had a chance. Blackwell finished with two for 20 in his four overs, and could take his share of the honour for Somerset's surprising win. (Cricinfo scorecard)

==== Gloucestershire v Glamorgan (24 June) ====
Gloucestershire (2pts) beat Glamorgan (0pts) by seven wickets

Glamorgan Dragons were out of luck at Bristol, as their top order collapsed to the bowling of Carl Greenidge. Only a last-wicket partnership between Robert Croft and Dean Cosker ensured that Glamorgan batted out 20 overs, as they were 70 for 8 at one point but finished on 128 for 9. However, it was never enough. Croft took two wickets with his off-spin, but Craig Spearman's 39 built the platform as Gloucestershire Steelbacks eased to victory with 17 balls to spare. (Cricinfo scorecard)

==== Northamptonshire v Warwickshire (24 June) ====
Northamptonshire (2pts) beat Warwickshire (0pts) by 38 runs

Northamptonshire Steelbacks took their second victory from two Twenty20 Cup matches thus far, as they accumulated 143 for 5 in 14 overs, despite no batsman hitting more than 40 in a rain-shortened match at Northampton. Scotsman Dougie Brown took one for nine off three overs for Warwickshire Bears, but the target was too large for the visitors, as Northamptonshire bowler Ben Phillips removed four Warwickshire lower-order batsmen – his second four-wicket-haul in three days – as the Bears crumbled to 105 for 9. (Cricinfo scorecard)

==== Nottinghamshire v Lancashire (24 June) ====
Nottinghamshire (2pts) beat Lancashire (0pts) by 92 runs

Nottinghamshire Outlaws plundered runs off the Lancashire Lightning fast bowlers at Trent Bridge, to recover from their first-game loss to Leicestershire. Both James Anderson and Glen Chapple were taken for 53 in four overs each, as the Outlaws made 198 for 5. In reply, only Steven Crook passed 20 for Lancashire, Graeme Swann took three for 32 and Mark Ealham two for 22, and Lancashire ended up with an inadequate 106 all out. (Cricinfo scorecard)

==== Derbyshire v Leicestershire (24 June) ====
Derbyshire (2pts) beat Leicestershire (0pts) by seven wickets (D/L method)

Derbyshire Phantoms beat last year's champions Leicestershire Foxes at The County Ground, Derby to be the only side with two victories in the North Division of the Twenty20 Cup. Bowling first turned out to be a stroke of genius, as the Leicestershire batsmen were tied down by Ian Hunter (three for 32) and Andre Botha (two for 19), and wickets were spread out as Leicestershire's last man, Claude Henderson, was caught on the last ball – all out for 137. Derbyshire's reply was shortened by rain, and they only got 14 overs to hit 103, and two wickets from David Masters set them back to 44 for 3. However, 42 from Luke Sutton ensured that Derbyshire made it to the target with seven balls to spare. (Cricinfo scorecard)

=== Matchday three ===
==== Kent v Middlesex (25 June) ====
Middlesex (2pts) beat Kent (0pts) by 20 runs

Ed Smith took over the mantle from Owais Shah as Middlesex Crusaders' most useful batsman in the Twenty20 Cup, as he recorded three sixes in a 59-ball 85 and lifted Middlesex to 189 for 8 against Kent Spitfires at Beckenham. In reply, Kent lost wickets regularly, and Justin Kemp – normally a quick scorer – couldn't find his footing and only made 23 not out off 19 balls, as Kent could only scamper 169 for 5 in their allotted 20 overs, 21 runs short of the target. (Cricinfo scorecard)

==== Surrey v Hampshire (25 June) ====
Hampshire (2pts) beat Surrey (0pts) by three wickets

James Bruce and Richard Logan, Hampshire Hawks' new-ball bowlers, reduced Surrey Lions to pieces at the Oval. Only Rikki Clarke passed 12 runs for Surrey, and he did so in style, making 52 with six fours and a six, while Logan and Bruce shared seven wickets between them. Hampshire had reason to be happy with bowling Surrey out for 118, although they did concede 17 wides, as extras were the second highest scorer for Surrey. Hampshire then attempted to collapse of their own, crashing to 6 for 2 and 66 for 7, but 34 from off-spinner and captain Shaun Udal saw them home without any further loss of wickets. (Cricinfo scorecard)

==== Essex v Sussex (26 June) ====
Essex (2pts) beat Sussex (0pts) by 43 runs

After Johannes van der Wath had given Sussex Sharks the edge with two early wickets against Essex Eagles, Andy Flower and Ryan ten Doeschate rebuilt to send the hosts to 151 for 5 after their 20 overs. Sussex, however, imploded following the departure of Chris Adams for 44, as Grant Flower took three quick wickets, and James Middlebrook and Andre Adams mopped up the tail for just 108. (Cricinfo scorecard)

==== Glamorgan v Warwickshire (25 June) ====
Warwickshire (2pts) beat Glamorgan (0pts) by 54 runs

Warwickshire Bears won their first Twenty20 match of the season in style, the deep batting line-up finally paying off. Almost every batsman contributed in their massive 205 for 7, Jamie Troughton top-scoring with 42, and no Glamorgan Dragons bowler escaped their wrath. When the Dragons batted, only Matthew Elliott and Sourav Ganguly gave them any hope of winning, and Ganguly's 36 off 35 balls was verging on the point of being useless when the required rate was 10 an over. A disciplined Warwickshire fielding effort – the Bears only conceded one extra – and Alex Loudon taking five for 33, resulted in Glamorgan falling to 151 all out in 18.2 overs. (Cricinfo scorecard)

==== Gloucestershire v Worcestershire (26 June) ====
Gloucestershire (2pts) beat Worcestershire (0pts) by five wickets

This was a game of two batsmen. After Steve Kirby had ripped out two Worcestershire Royals wickets early on, to finish with figures of two for 15 from four overs, the Royals had been 24 for 3. Zander de Bruyn then hit eight fours and three sixes in his 76 not out, lifting the Royals to 162 for 6 and setting a potentially tricky target. However, Phil Weston replied with 73 not out of his own, and despite only Craig Spearman passing 20 of the other batsmen, Weston secured a win for Gloucestershire with two balls to spare. (Cricinfo scorecard)

==== Nottinghamshire v Yorkshire (26 June) ====
Yorkshire (2pts) beat Nottinghamshire (0pts) by two wickets

Tim Bresnan's onslaught of fast bowling resulted in three quick wickets for Yorkshire Phoenix, yet he was only called upon to bowl three overs – for 22 runs – and Nottinghamshire Outlaws were let off the hook. Chris Read top-scored with 43 off 35, propelling the hosts to 170 for 8. An excellent start by Ian Harvey and Michael Lumb sent Yorkshire to 60 for 1, as Harvey found boundaries seemingly at will – when he was out for 74 (with 64 of them in boundaries), however, Yorkshire imploded from 121 for 2 to 135 for 6. Craig White and Ismail Dawood fought back, and number 10 Richard Dawson won them the match with a two and a four, as Yorkshire needed four runs from the last three deliveries of the game. (Cricinfo scorecard)

==== Leicestershire v Durham (26 June) ====
Leicestershire (2pts) beat Durham (0pts) by three runs

Durham Dynamos contrived to lose this one, having first had Leicestershire Foxes on the rack after limiting them to a total of 150 for 9. Economical bowling from Dale Benkenstein, who took two for 17, made that possible, but he was later to be the main culprit as Charl Willoughby and Jeremy Snape took wickets and refused to give him runs. He eventually finished on 18 from 17 balls, making the task of Gareth Breese and Gordon Muchall impossible – and Durham finished an agonising three runs short. (Cricinfo scorecard)

=== Matchday four ===
==== Hampshire v Kent (27 June) ====
Hampshire (2pts) beat Kent (0pts) by five wickets

Zimbabwean Greg Lamb, playing for the Hampshire Hawks as a home qualified player due to owning an English passport, took four wickets, including three former Test players, for 28 – which helped peg Kent Spitfires back to 154 for 9. Hampshire's reply was very well timed, and even a good bowling spell from Kent's James Tredwell – who only conceded sixteen runs off the bat in four overs – could not stop the Hawks. Lawrence Prittipaul made 35 before being out on the penultimate ball with the scores tied, but off-spinner and stand-in captain Shaun Udal, however, made a single on the last ball, as Hampshire reached 155 for 5 in their 20 overs – Nic Pothas top-scoring with 58. (Cricinfo scorecard)

==== Surrey v Middlesex (28 June) ====
Surrey (2pts) beat Middlesex (0pts) by 22 runs (D/L method)

Rikki Clarke top-scored with 46 and top-bowled with three for 11 for the Surrey Lions as they moved closer to a quarter-final spot in the Twenty20 Cup with a Duckworth–Lewis method win over Middlesex Crusaders. Batting first, Surrey made 180 for 7, Tim Murtagh hitting 24 off the last eight balls as Melvyn Betts of Middlesex was smashed around. In reply, only Ed Smith could do anything serious against the Surrey bowlers, with 33 off 22 balls. When Clarke dug out him, Scott Styris and Ed Joyce in quick succession, however, things looked bright for Surrey, and then rain intervened after 11 overs of the Middlesex innings. They were never allowed to come back, and as they were 22 runs behind the par score with their 78 for 4, Surrey took the victory. (Cricinfo scorecard)

==== Hampshire v Essex (28 June) ====
Match abandoned; Hampshire (1pt), Essex (1pt)

Hampshire Hawks and Essex Eagles shared the spoils as the match at The Rose Bowl, Southampton never got underway. (Cricinfo scorecard)

==== Somerset v Glamorgan (27 June) ====
Somerset (2pts) beat Glamorgan (0pts) by 89 runs

James Hildreth smashed 71 runs off 37 balls to lift Somerset Sabres to a convincing victory at Taunton. Along with Keith Parsons making 57 off 28, they made a dent in the theory that spinners are useful in Twenty20 cricket, as experienced off-spinner Robert Croft was dispatched for 50 runs in four overs. The slow left arm bowler Dean Cosker was also taken for 45 in his four. The visitors' reply never really got going, Ian Blackwell taking four Glamorgan Dragons wickets for 26 runs as the Welshmen crumbled to 123 all out, Sourav Ganguly top-scoring with 35. (Cricinfo scorecard)

==== Worcestershire v Northamptonshire (27 June) ====
Northamptonshire (2pts) beat Worcestershire (0pts) by 37 runs

David Sales (59 runs) and Usman Afzaal (46) lifted Northamptonshire Steelbacks to a very competitive total of 180 for 6 at New Road, where Shoaib Akhtar bowled a maiden over but was smashed for thirty-three runs in the other three overs he bowled. The hosts' innings saw Worcestershire Royals lose Graeme Hick early on, and despite 53 from Stephen Moore, Northamptonshire's bowlers had a good grip on the Worcestershire players – Johann Louw got the best figures for the Steelbacks with three for 25 – and Worcestershire finished on 143 for 8. (Cricinfo scorecard)

==== Gloucestershire v Warwickshire (28 June) ====
No result; Gloucestershire (1pt), Warwickshire (1pt)

37 balls were delivered before Gloucestershire Steelbacks and Warwickshire Bears were forced to abandon the game at The County Ground, Bristol due to rain. Warwickshire were 44 for 1 after 10 leg-byes and 16 not out from Nick Knight when the game was stopped. (Cricinfo scorecard)

==== Lancashire v Leicestershire (27 June) ====
Lancashire (2pts) beat Leicestershire (0pts) by eight wickets

HD Ackerman was the only one who resisted a patient bowling display from Lancashire Lightning at their home ground, Old Trafford. Muttiah Muralitharan, the Sri Lankan off-spinner, took four for 19 in four overs, yet Ackerman made 79 not out amid the carnage, lifting Leicestershire Foxes to 146 for 7. However, Stuart Law took matters into his own hands, bludgeoning twelve fours and four sixes on his way to 92 not out – the highest score of the season so far – and Lancashire won with four wickets and 23 deliveries to spare. (Cricinfo scorecard)

==== Yorkshire v Derbyshire (28 June) ====
Yorkshire (2pts) beat Derbyshire (0pts) by six wickets

A high-scoring game at Headingley saw both sides score at run-rates in excess of 9. Derbyshire Phantoms batted first, with Jonathan Moss notching up 83 off just 44 balls – that's nearly two runs from every ball – and England Test bowler Matthew Hoggard was hit for 45 runs in three overs. Tim Bresnan, however, continued to like the short format, as he took three for 26 in four overs. In reply, Yorkshire Phoenix reaped the benefits of a massive partnership between Australians Ian Harvey (who made 109, the first Twenty20 century of the season) and Phil Jaques who shared a 124-run stand for the second wicket. Michael Lumb and Bresnan then kept the run rate up, and Yorkshire reached 198 for 4 with an over left in the game to clinch victory. (Cricinfo scorecard)

==== Durham v Nottinghamshire (28 June) ====
Durham (2pts) beat Nottinghamshire (0pts) by six wickets

Durham Dynamos got back on track with a closely fought six-wicket win at Riverside. Mark Ealham had some fun with Durham bowler Neil Killeen as he thumped six sixes in a 17-ball 45, and his partnership with Chris Read threatened to lift Nottinghamshire Outlaws to a much bigger score than their final 179. However, four wickets from Jamaican-born Gareth Breese helped stem the tide. In reply, Nathan Astle and Gordon Muchall both made 64 – the latter a not out – and Ealham was smashed about, conceding 51 runs in four overs. It was almost as bad for Andrew Harris, who conceded 38 off 15 legitimate deliveries as Durham won with three balls to spare. (Cricinfo scorecard)

=== Matchday five ===
==== Essex v Hampshire (29 June) ====
No result; Essex (1pt), Hampshire (1pt)

Hampshire Hawks endured their second no-result in two days against Essex Eagles, having batted to a competitive total of 151 for 9 in their 20 overs, with Greg Lamb making 67. However, the Essex innings never got off, due to rain. (Cricinfo scorecard)

==== Middlesex v Kent (29 June) ====
Middlesex (2pts) beat Kent (0pts) by six wickets

At Uxbridge, Middlesex Crusaders proved the worth of wicket-taking bowling. Irfan Pathan dug out Matthew Walker with the second ball of the game, and that set the tone of the innings. Left-arm spinner Chris Peploe took three wickets, but conceded 35 runs, yet Kent's final total of 144 for 8 did not look too threatening. Owais Shah kept ploughing on his hard-hitting form, taking James Tredwell to the cleaners in his 59 not out, and Middlesex made it to 145 for 4 with 16 balls remaining in the innings, as none of the opposition bowlers took more than one wicket. (Cricinfo scorecard)

==== Sussex v Surrey (29 June) ====
Surrey (2pts) beat Sussex (0pts) by 5 wickets (D/L method)

A close, rain-damaged match at The County Ground, Hove eventually ended in Surrey Lions snaring a last-ball victory over Sussex Sharks. Batting first, the hosts made 139 for 6 in 17 overs, spinner Nayan Doshi taking three wickets despite being the most expensive of the bowlers, while Matt Prior top-scored with 51. A 28-ball fifty from Ali Brown then lifted Surrey to 74 for 1, but two run outs saw them lose their next four wickets for eight runs. Azhar Mahmood and Ian Salisbury, however, shared a 36-run partnership and saw them pass the revised target of 114 by two runs on the very last ball of the game. (Cricinfo scorecard)

==== Northamptonshire v Somerset (29 June) ====
Somerset (2pts) beat Northamptonshire (0pts) by five wickets

At Northampton, Andy Caddick served up an unusually economical spell, taking two for 12 in three overs despite two wides. That helped tie the hosts Northamptonshire Steelbacks down to 95 for 6 in 12 overs in the rain-shortened game, and with Graeme Smith and Keith Parsons at the crease and the score 55 for 1, things looked bright for Somerset Sabres. Two wickets from Jason Brown helped put the odds for a Northamptonshire win down, but Somerset prevailed, Parsons hitting the winning runs on the last ball as Somerset finished on 97 for 5. (Cricinfo scorecard)

==== Warwickshire v Glamorgan (30 June) ====
Warwickshire (2pts) beat Glamorgan (0pts) by four runs

Glamorgan Dragons continued their poor form in an eventful game at Edgbaston. Jamie Troughton's 51 rescued Warwickshire Bears from a potentially tricky situation at 56 for 4, and quick hitting from Dougie Brown along with eleven extras gave the hosts a total of 169 for 9. Glamorgan started well, with Sourav Ganguly and Matthew Elliott lifting them to 88 for 1 before leaving in quick succession to Neil Carter and Jonathan Trott respectively. Michael Powell and David Hemp then built another big partnership of 59 to see Glamorgan 147 for 3, but Carter and Brown then shared five wickets as Glamorgan's lower middle order fell apart. Powell tried to pair up with Dean Cosker, but the damage was already done, and Powell was run out on the penultimate ball as they needed six runs from two balls. (Cricinfo scorecard)

==== Lancashire v Derbyshire (29 June) ====
Lancashire (2pts) beat Derbyshire (0pts) by 66 runs

Brad Hodge and 23 wides gave Lancashire Lightning a competitive total against Derbyshire Phantoms, making 164 for 8 despite Kevin Dean's spell of one for 16 from four overs. Hodge made 44 off 34 balls, and Dominic Cork – promoted to five – made 28, the only ones to pass 20. Hodge, who came on as fourth change bowler, fuelled the Derbyshire implosion with wickets, as they couldn't hit the ball off the square and were all out for 98 – Hodge ending with figures of four for 17. (Cricinfo scorecard)

==== Nottinghamshire v Leicestershire (30 June) ====
Leicestershire (2pts) beat Nottinghamshire (0pts) by 21 runs

Leicestershire Foxes took the win at Trent Bridge in a low-scoring match. Nottinghamshire Outlaws had won the toss and bowled first, and ought to have been pretty pleased with restricting the Foxes to 150 for 4, even though they conceded 15 extras. The opening partnership of HD Ackerman and Darren Maddy for 67 runs had promised more for Leicestershire. However, West Indian Ottis Gibson dug out two early wickets in Graeme Swann and Stephen Fleming – Darren Maddy and David Masters then took wickets at leisure, and Nottinghamshire were 96 for 7. Despite a rescue mission from Gareth Clough who hit 30 off 16 balls, there was no hitting power from the other players, and Nottinghamshire finished on 129 for 8. (Cricinfo scorecard)

==== Yorkshire v Durham (30 June) ====
Durham (2pts) beat Yorkshire (0pts) by two wickets

Durham Dynamos won a low-scoring game at Headingley as both these sides looked to wave goodbye to a quarter-final spot. Yorkshire Phoenix were sent in to bat, but struggled to score runs, falling to 12 for three early on. Durham captain Dale Benkenstein bowled himself for two overs to take three wickets for 10, and that spell set Yorkshire back sufficiently to limit them to 123 for 7 – despite a total of 10 extras. Matthew Hoggard and Tim Bresnan then took three quick wickets between them to reduce Durham to 15 for 3, but despite eight wickets falling in the Durham innings, Phil Mustard's 31 and an identical score from No. 8 Gary Scott was enough to lift them to 124 for 8 with an over remaining. (Cricinfo scorecard)

=== Matchday six ===
==== Middlesex v Essex (1 July) ====
Middlesex (2pts) beat Essex (0pts) by 31 runs

Middlesex Crusaders defeated Essex Eagles despite missing Irish batsman Ed Joyce, who had gone off to play in the 2005 ICC Trophy. An opening partnership between Owais Shah and Ed Smith for 100 built the platform, Shah eventually making 79, and despite three wickets from Essex off-spinner James Middlebrook, Irfan Pathan smashed two sixes in his 21 to lift Middlesex to 185 for 6. Then Pathan took three quick wickets, those of Alastair Cook, Ronnie Irani and Ravinder Bopara, as Essex crashed to 45 for 5. James Foster made 62 not out to rescue Essex' honour somewhat, but the final score – 154 for 7 – was well short. Pathan got another wicket near the end to finish with four for 27. (Cricinfo scorecard)

==== Surrey v Kent (1 July) ====
Surrey (2pts) beat Kent (0pts) by 23 runs (D/L method)

Kent Spitfires suffered another loss, this time at the Oval against Surrey Lions. In a rain-hit game shortened by five overs, Surrey scored freely, hitting at nearly 11 runs an over – Ali Brown with 29 and Scott Newman with 52 not out off 27 balls doing the brunt of the damage. Kent made an attempt at chasing 168, with Michael Carberry taking 23 runs off nine balls in his innings from number three, but Surrey spinner Nayan Doshi took four wickets for 27 to set them back to 123 for 6. With economical bowling from Azhar Mahmood as well, Kent only managed 144 for 8. (Cricinfo scorecard)

==== Sussex v Hampshire (1 July) ====
Sussex (2pts) beat Hampshire (0pts) by 10 runs

A twelve-over game at Hove was won by Sussex Sharks, though the rain threatened to destroy it all. IanWard and Matt Prior opened the batting for Sussex, who had been sent in to bat by Hampshire Hawks' captain Shaun Udal, and they made good use of it, sending Sussex to 53 for 0. Two quick wickets from Sean Ervine slowed the Sharks' progression, as they slumped to 88 for 5, but Michael Yardy hit 10 in four balls in an unbeaten 11-run sixth-wicket stand with Carl Hopkinson. Chasing, Hampshire never quite kept up with the required run rate, as Mushtaq Ahmed took three for 19 in his three overs to be the main cause of the Hawks' demise, and Hampshire finished on 89 for 6. (Cricinfo scorecard)

==== Glamorgan v Northamptonshire (1 July) ====
Match abandoned without a ball bowled; Glamorgan (1pt), Northamptonshire (1pt)

The weather at Sophia Gardens in Cardiff prevented a match from getting underway between Glamorgan Dragons and Northamptonshire Steelbacks. (Cricinfo scorecard)

==== Gloucestershire v Somerset (1 July) ====
No result; Gloucestershire (1pt), Somerset (1pt)

Only thirteen overs of play was possible at The County Ground, Bristol. By that time, two Somerset Sabres batsmen had departed for golden ducks – Graeme Smith and James Hildreth – and Somerset were 61 for 7. Gloucestershire Gladiators would have fancied their chances, but rain intervened to spoil the party. (Cricinfo scorecard

==== Warwickshire v Worcestershire (1 July) ====
Worcestershire (2pts) beat Warwickshire (0pts) by one run

Worcestershire Royals took their second successive one-run victory over Warwickshire Bears, to the agony of home fans at Edgbaston. After Heath Streak took two early wickets, Neil Carter entered the scene as the sixth bowler to be used. He took five wickets inside four overs, for 19 runs, as Worcestershire were all out for 141 with seven balls to spare. In reply, two run outs and wickets from Gareth Batty and Zander de Bruyn left Warwickshire trailing by 60 with one wicket in hand, with Heath Streak and James Anyon at the crease. Streak rotated the strike well, facing most of the balls and hitting most of the runs, and brought the score to 140 for 9 with a ball to spare. Then – setting off for the last run that would tie the scores (and win the match for Warwickshire on fewer wickets lost) – Streak was run out for 59, off 32 balls, and Warwickshire's quarter-final hopes were dented, but not wiped out. (Cricinfo scorecard)

==== Durham v Leicestershire (1 July) ====
Leicestershire (2pts) beat Durham (0pts) by 32 runs

Last year's champions Leicestershire Foxes were back on track for the quarter-finals thanks to 73 from John Sadler at the Riverside Ground. Sadler's 72-run second-wicket partnership with skipper HD Ackerman lifted the visitors to 154 for 7. Durham Dynamos yet again showed their inability to hit at anything significantly above 6 an over, Nicky Peng's top-score of 37 being off 41 balls. Despite captain Dale Benkenstein hitting 33 not out off 16 deliveries, it did not help, as Leicestershire smothered them to 122 for 7. (Cricinfo scorecard)

==== Lancashire v Yorkshire (1 July) ====
Lancashire (2pts) beat Yorkshire (0pts) by 110 runs

Lancashire Lightning recorded the most emphatic victory by runs in the 2005 Twenty20 season, as they had fun with the Yorkshire Phoenix bowlers. After being put in to bat, Mal Loye and Stuart Law put on 106 for the first wicket, and when Loye departed for 47 Brad Hodge followed up with a 17-ball 33, a partnership of 77 with Law. Despite Ian Harvey digging into them with two wickets, the early run-rate ensured that Lancashire set a target of 208, Law recording the second Twenty20 century this season – in 56 balls. Ian Harvey, the man responsible for the first of those centuries, was out early for 1, and wickets fell to everyone as Yorkshire were out for 97 – Dominic Cork taking three for 10, Muttiah Muralitharan three for 17, and James Anderson two for 26. Matthew Hoggard and Tim Bresnan recorded the highest partnership for Yorkshire, with 22 for the tenth wicket. (Cricinfo scorecard)

==== Nottinghamshire v Derbyshire (1 July) ====
Derbyshire (2pts) beat Nottinghamshire (0pts) by four wickets

Derbyshire Phantoms needed to win to have a chance of qualifying for the quarter-finals – and did it, in a thriller finish. Nottinghamshire Outlaws batted first, and Will Smith and Chris Read made 51 and 44 not out respectively. The pair where the only two Nottinghamshire batsmen to pass 20, their contributions lifted the hosts to 147 for 8. Michael Di Venuto and Luke Sutton took Derbyshire to 92 for 1 before economical bowling chipped away at Derbyshire's batting. However, captain Sutton kept a cool head, anchoring the chase with 61 not out in 54 balls as Derbyshire won with two balls to spare. (Cricinfo scorecard)

=== Matchday seven ===
==== Somerset v Northamptonshire (2 July) ====
Northamptonshire (2pts) beat Somerset (0pts) by five wickets

Despite Graeme Smith making a 53-ball century, and pairing up with Matthew Wood for 129 for the first wicket, Somerset Sabres still lost the match at Taunton. Smith's 105 helped Somerset set a target of 190, but none of the bowlers conceded less than seven an over to Northamptonshire Steelbacks' batting. Simon Francis was the worst, ending with 57 conceded runs in four overs, while Riki Wessels hit 49 not out with four sixes off 22 balls, and the Sabres had to see that Northamptonshire won with an over to spare. (Cricinfo scorecard)

==== Worcestershire v Gloucestershire (2 July) ====
Gloucestershire (2pts) beat Worcestershire (0pts) by nine wickets

The visitors Gloucestershire Gladiators recorded an easy victory at New Road as Worcestershire scored only 100 all out in their innings, Stephen Moore top-scoring with only 23. Martyn Ball took three for 24, but all the bowlers got wickets, and Mark Alleyne conceded only six runs in four overs. Although they lost Craig Spearman with the score on 22, the Gladiators knocked off their target easily, with nine wickets and five overs to spare. (Cricinfo scorecard)

==== Lancashire v Durham (3 July) ====
Lancashire (2pts) beat Durham (0pts) by 37 runs

Mal Loye and Brad Hodge helped Lancashire Lightning to recover after Stuart Law was stumped in the second over off Durham Dynamos medium-pacer Neil Killeen. Loye and Hodge paired up for 169 for the second wicket, as Loye became the second Lancastrian to score a Twenty20 century this season before he was eventually caught off Nathan Astle's bowling for 100. Lancashire closed on 208 for 4, and only Killeen conceded less than 30 runs of Durham's six bowlers. Astle got the best bowling figures, with two for 37, but his batting helped little – 55 for 37 was never enough to keep up with the asking rate of 10.5. When Durham realised that, they tried to lash out, and a result, wickets tumbled to Glen Chapple and Dominic Cork and Durham finished their 20 overs with the score on 171 for 7. (Cricinfo scorecard)

==== Yorkshire v Nottinghamshire (3 July) ====
Nottinghamshire (2pts) beat Yorkshire (0pts) by six wickets

Nottinghamshire won the toss at Headingley and put Yorkshire into bat. The hosts suffered an immediate setback when Ian Harvey was out from the first ball to Andrew Harris, but Craig White and Phil Jaques settled the ship, with Jaques going on to score 55 off 33 balls. Rich Pyrah finished the innings with 31 off 17 as Yorkshire set their guests a target of 181 to win. The start of Nottinghamshire's innings was the opposite to Yorkshire's: openers Will Smith (55) and Graeme Swann (62) put on 101 before they were parted, as Swann slashed nine fours, three sixes, and also had time to run eight times across the pitch in a 25-ball frenzy. Yorkshire took the next four wickets for 50 runs, with leg spinner Mark Lawson grabbing two, and with a high total to chase the game was in the balance. However, Chris Read's 28 off 18 balls saw Nottinghamshire home with just two balls to go. (Cricinfo scorecard)

==== Derbyshire v Lancashire (4 July) ====
Lancashire (2pts) beat Derbyshire (0pts) by 50 runs (D/L method)

Big scores from Stuart Law (67) and Brad Hodge (90 not out) helped Lancashire Lightning to a massive 205 for 2 at The County Ground, Derby, medium-pacer Ian Hunter taking both wickets. Law and Hodge shared a 154-run stand for the second wicket. Two early wickets from former England ODI player James Anderson pegged Derbyshire Phantoms back, and Brad Hodge took four for 27 – his second Twenty20 four-wicket-haul of the season – to reduce Derbyshire to 106 for 7, before rain intervened with 5.3 overs left in the game. The rain never relented, and it was calculated that Derbyshire's par score was 156, thus Lancashire took a convincing 50-run victory. The victory meant that Lancashire qualified for the quarter-finals with one game to spare. (Cricinfo scorecard)

==== Durham v Yorkshire (4 July) ====
Yorkshire (2pts) beat Durham (0pts) by 40 runs

Yorkshire Phoenix got their first win in three Twenty20 games, but the quarter-finals still looked out of sight, as they needed to win their last game and Derbyshire lose their last. Batting first, Ian Harvey, Craig White and Paul Jaques all made scores between 40 and 60, to lift Yorkshire to 126 for 1 at one point. Off-spinner Gary Scott and medium-pacer Dale Benkenstein took three wickets between them, but Yorkshire still managed 171 for 7. Durham Dynamos looked in the game when Benkenstein and Gordon Muchall were at the crease, pairing up for 79 for the fourth wicket, but a burst of wickets – thanks to Richard Dawson and Anthony McGrath's bowling – sent Durham to the ropes at 111 for 8. Twelve minutes later, it was all over for 131, with 17 deliveries remaining. Yorkshire's 30-year-old seam bowler Adam Warren took two for 32 on Twenty20 debut. (Cricinfo scorecard)

==== Sussex v Middlesex (4 July) ====
No result; Sussex (1pt), Middlesex (1pt)

Seven overs of play was possible at The County Ground, Hove, before rain intervened. Owais Shah made 30 not out off 20 balls to see Middlesex Crusaders to a healthy 56 for 1, but Sussex Sharks never got the chance to chase as the game was abandoned. (Cricinfo scorecard)

==== Warwickshire v Somerset (4 July) ====
Warwickshire (2pts) beat Somerset (0pts) by 47 runs

Warwickshire Bears jumped on the quarter-final train just as it seemed to be leaving the station, grabbing the ticket out of the hands of Somerset Sabres. Neil Carter and Ian Bell opened the batting and scored quickly, sending the score to 40 for 1, but part-timer William Durston got three wickets in quick succession to have three for four at one point. Trevor Penney then smashed three successive sixes off Durston to end with 35 not out off 13 balls. Thus, Warwickshire closed on 172 for 8, and patient bowling from Carter and Alex Loudon sent them crumbling to 89 for 6. Arul Suppiah and Durston paired up for 27 for the seventh wicket, but when Suppiah was bowled by Jonathan Trott it looked hopeless for Somerset. Jamie Anyon wrapped them up with a hat-trick to end Somerset's innings on 125. (Cricinfo scorecard)

==== Essex v Surrey (5 July) ====
Essex (2pts) beat Surrey (0pts) by one run

Rain ravaged The County Ground, Chelmsford and delayed the match between Essex Eagles and Surrey Lions to after ten o'clock. When it finally began, it had been shortened to five overs a side, and Essex made good use of it as they scored 71 for 3 – Ronnie Irani making 32, while Azhar Mahmood took two for three for Surrey. In reply, Antonio Palladino took two wickets for Essex, but it looked up for grabs when Surrey needed eight off five after James Middlebrook bowled a wide that went for four – however, he only conceded six runs from the remaining balls of the game, and Surrey finished on 70 for 2. Yet, they would have to be exceedingly unlucky in their last game to be eliminated, while Essex jumped into the top three and looked to qualify along with them. (Cricinfo scorecard)

==== Kent v Sussex (5 July) ====
No result; Kent (1pt), Sussex (1pt)

In eleven overs of play, Kent Spitfires moved to 91 for 1, Andrew Hall making 43 not out as Sussex Sharks' new man, Pakistani Naved-ul-Hasan made his debut with nought for 10 in two overs. Then, rain made play impossible. (Cricinfo scorecard)

==== Glamorgan v Gloucestershire (5 July) ====
Glamorgan (2pts) beat Gloucestershire (0pts) by ten wickets

Glamorgan Dragons broke their streak of four successive losses with a comfortable victory at Sophia Gardins. The two brothers David Harrison and Adam Harrison took two wickets each for Glamorgan, as Gloucestershire Gladiators crumbled to 57 for 7. Jon Lewis and Mark Alleyne shared a 68-run stand, but a quick burst of wickets from Robert Croft and Andrew Davies had them all out for 128 at Sophia Gardens. Croft and Matthew Elliott both made fifties as Glamorgan Dragons knocked off the runs with ten wickets and 7.3 overs to spare, helped by five no-balls and four wides from the Gloucestershire bowlers. (Cricinfo scorecard)

==== Leicestershire v Derbyshire (5 July) ====
Match abandoned; Leicestershire (1pt), Derbyshire (1pt)

No play was possible at Grace Road due to rain, but Leicestershire Foxes moved one step closer to the second place that guaranteed a quarter-final – the no-result meant that they were still two points ahead of Derbyshire Phantoms in third place, and dominating on net run-rate. (Cricinfo scorecard)

==== Northamptonshire v Worcestershire (5 July) ====
Match abandoned; Northamptonshire (1pt), Worcestershire (1pt)

No play was possible at The County Ground, Northampton due to rain, and the hosts Northamptonshire Steelbacks qualified for the quarter-finals thanks to the no-result. (Cricinfo scorecard)

=== Matchday eight ===
==== Kent v Essex (6 July) ====
Kent (2pts) beat Essex (0pts) by five runs

Dane Amjad Khan, who had missed the first part of the 2005 ICC Trophy and most of the Twenty20 Cup due to injury, returned to cricket with a very decent bowling spell of three for 24 to set Essex Eagles back to 26 for 3. Khan's Kent Spitfires had batted first, however, and 59 not out from left-hander Michael Carberry lifted them to a total of 154 for 4, while Andre Adams shone on the bowling front for Essex with two for 12 off three overs. However, the Spitfires kept firing dangerous balls at the Eagles, and eventually shot them down to 149 for 7 – Mark Pettini making 60 in vain before he was run out, while Andrew Hall took two for 30 for Kent. (Cricinfo scorecard)

==== Middlesex v Hampshire (6 July) ====
Hampshire (2pts) beat Middlesex (0pts) by six wickets

In a high-scoring match at Richmond, Middlesex Crusaders made 174 for 7 having opted to bat first. Owais Shah made yet another fifty – his fifth in eight innings – while Scott Styris and Paul Weekes made quick scores to up the run-rate. Shaun Udal, Sean Ervine and Craig McMillan all got two wickets. Hampshire Hawks started slowly, at about seven an over, but McMillan took a liking to Chris Peploe in particular as he smashed five sixes in his half-hour 65 not out, and thanks to McMillan's big hitting Hampshire won with sixteen balls and six wickets to spare. However, it was in vain – with only three wins, they finished fourth in the South Division tables, while Middlesex qualified despite having a poorer net run rate than Hampshire. (Cricinfo scorecard)

==== Surrey v Sussex (6 July) ====
Sussex (2pts) beat Surrey (0pts) by three wickets

Surrey Lions were consistently pegged back by the Sussex Sharks' bowling at The Oval, having been put in to bat by Sussex captain Chris Adams. Azhar Mahmood stood firm and knocked off 40 unbeaten runs, but Naved-ul-Hasan, James Kirtley and Mushtaq Ahmed all got two wickets for less than six runs an over as Surrey eventually had to settle for 144 for 8. In reply, IanWard made a quickfire 50, off 28 balls, before being bowled by Surrey off-spinner Nayan Doshi to send Sussex to 82 for 3. Adams and Murray Goodwin both made 28, while Azhar Mahmood took two for 21 from four overs. Eventually, a six from Naved-ul-Hasan won Sussex the game with three balls to spare to put them third in the table, but as they were the poorest third-placed side in the competition with only three wins, they were still knocked out. (Cricinfo scorecard)

==== Somerset v Gloucestershire (6 July) ====
Somerset (2pts) beat Gloucestershire (0pts) by 95 runs

Somerset Sabres made it through to the quarter-finals after recording a massive score of 228 for 5 in twenty overs – the highest team total in Twenty20 Cup history, eclipsing a record set a couple of weeks earlier. The most economical bowler was Steve Kirby, and he conceded 35 runs in four overs, while the other four where all taken for more than 40 runs. Graeme Smith top-scored with 53, Ian Blackwell made 45, and James Hildreth recorded 32 off 10 balls – 28 from six shots to the boundary and four from the other four deliveries. Somerset's innings featured eight sixes and twenty extras. Gloucestershire Gladiators, who were second in the Midland/Wales/West group before this game at Taunton, had to go for expansive strokes, and were all out in sixteen overs, Gareth Andrew taking four for 22 while Craig Spearman top scored with 35 off 17 balls. Keith Parsons also contributed bowling-wise, taking three for 12. (Cricinfo scorecard)

==== Warwickshire v Northamptonshire (6 July) ====
Warwickshire (2pts) beat Northamptonshire (0pts) by 41 runs

Warwickshire Bears were lifted to a total of 205 for 2 by hitting eight sixes at Edgbaston, Ian Bell carrying his side with 66 not out off just 38 balls. Nick Knight also made 61 as Northamptonshire Steelbacks failed to make any impact with the ball. The Northamptonshire reply was stifled by some reasonably economical bowling, with no regular bowler conceding more than eight an over, and good fielding which yielded one run out and stopped the boundaries. Warwickshire seamer Jamie Anyon took three for 34, for his second successive match with a three-wicket haul, while Usman Afzaal became top scorer with a run-a-ball 43. Ben Phillips hit 41 not out from number four to complement his bowling figures of two for 43. In the end, Northamptonshire made 164 for 6, but still went through – along with Warwickshire, who finished second in their group thanks to their win over Somerset two days earlier. (Cricinfo scorecard)

==== Worcestershire v Glamorgan (6 July) ====
Worcestershire (2pts) beat Glamorgan (0pts) by 37 runs

Both Worcestershire Royals and Glamorgan Dragons were knocked out before the last round of the Twenty20 Cup group stage, so the match at New Road was fairly academic. It did not stop Worcestershire from amassing one of the highest scores in Twenty20 Cup history with 223 for 9 – Ben Smith only taking 45 balls to smack 105 off the Glamorgan bowlers, with twelve fours and six sixes, as he lifted his career Twenty20 average from 15 to 20.62. The partnership of 149 with Graeme Hick was enough to win the match for Worcestershire, as Glamorgan never quite got the hang of Shoaib Akhtar – who bowled two overs for 14 with a no-ball and a wide. Glamorgan ended up only losing five wickets, but 224 was always too much to ask, and they finished with a total 186 for 5. (Cricinfo scorecard)

==== Derbyshire v Nottinghamshire (6 July) ====
Derbyshire (2pts) beat Nottinghamshire (0pts) by nine wickets

Nottinghamshire Outlaws were limited to 139 for 5 by economical Derbyshire Phantoms bowling – which allowed them to take singles and not much more at Derby. Only ten boundaries were hit during Nottinghamshire's innings, all in fours, and Chris Read – usually a man with a high strike-rate – was limited to 29 off 31 balls. The Derbyshire reply was spearheaded by Michael Di Venuto who made an unbeaten 77 and added 92 with Jonathan Moss for the second wicket. Derbyshire passed their target with nine wickets and 20 balls in hand, and the victory gave them a quarter-final berth. (Cricinfo scorecard)

==== Durham v Lancashire (6 July) ====
Match abandoned; Durham (1pt), Lancashire (1pt)

As Lancashire Lightning were already through and Durham Dynamos already knocked out of the Twenty20 Cup, the rain at the Riverside Ground mattered little. Both sides shared a point in the game. (Cricinfo scorecard)

==== Leicestershire v Yorkshire (6 July) ====
Leicestershire (2pts) beat Yorkshire (0pts) by seven wickets

With a lot of luck with other results, Yorkshire Phoenix could have qualified for the quarter-finals with a win in this game against Leicestershire Foxes. However, as Ian Harvey's support batsmen failed to score at more than three an over until Anthony McGrath came in at five with the scoreboard on 84 for 3, their innings was eventually worth just 177 for 5 – Harvey making 77 of those and McGrath 33. In reply, opening batsman Darren Maddy anchored the innings with 72 not out, and Jeremy Snape saw off the required runs as he hit 39 off 23 balls and the Foxes won with nine balls and seven wickets to spare. Leicestershire, who needed a tie or better to be completely assured of the quarter-final spot, thus went through. (Cricinfo scorecard)

=== Tables ===
==== Midlands/Wales/West Division ====
Midlands/Wales/West Division Standings
Team	M	W	L	NR	Pts	NRR
Northamptonshire Steelbacks	8	4	2	2	10	+1.17
Warwickshire Bears	8	4	3	1	9	+0.79
Somerset Sabres	8	4	3	1	9	+1.08
Gloucestershire Gladiators	8	3	3	2	8	−1.44
Worcestershire Royals	8	3	4	1	7	−0.46
Glamorgan Dragons	8	2	5	1	5	−1.09

==== North Division ====
North Division Standings
Team	M	W	L	NR	Pts	NRR
Lancashire Lightning	8	6	1	1	13	+1.77
Leicestershire Foxes	8	5	2	1	11	+0.25
Derbyshire Phantoms	8	4	3	1	9	−0.45
Yorkshire Phoenix	8	3	5	0	6	−0.70
Durham Dynamos	8	2	5	1	5	−0.87
Nottinghamshire Outlaws	8	2	6	0	4	+0.13

==== South Division ====
South Division Standings
Team	M	W	L	NR	Pts	NRR
Surrey Lions	8	5	3	0	10	+0.64
Middlesex Crusaders	8	4	3	1	9	+0.16
Sussex Sharks	8	3	2	3	9	+0.13
Hampshire Hawks	8	3	2	3	9	+0.20
Essex Eagles	8	3	3	2	8	−0.06
Kent Spitfires	8	1	6	1	3	−1.02

Tie-breaker rules:

1. Points (2 for a win, 1 for a no-result, 0 for a loss)
2. Games won
3. Head-to-head result(s) between teams
4. Net run rate

== Quarter-finals ==
=== Lancashire v Derbyshire (18 July) ===
Lancashire beat Derbyshire by 17 runs to progress to the Semi-Finals of the Twenty20 Cup

After Mal Loye's boundary-filled 73, off just 32 balls, Derbyshire Phantoms were probably happy that they escaped with conceding 189 runs in their game with Lancashire Lightning at Old Trafford. Lancashire tried to employ pinch hitters such as Dominic Cork and Glenn Chapple to get the runs flowing quickly, but they disappointed slightly, hitting at just over a run a ball. Derbyshire's chase looked possible despite Gary Keedy taking the wickets of Michael Di Venuto and Jonathan Moss, two danger men, early on – as they were 121 for 3 – but Keedy dug out another wicket, and that spurred a collapse to 139 for 8, part-time off-spinner Andrew Crook joining in with two for 35. Derbyshire needed some big hits from the specialist bowlers in the end, and crumbled to 172 with three balls remaining, James Anderson getting the honour of taking the last wicket. (Cricinfo scorecard)

=== Leicestershire v Middlesex (18 July) ===
Leicestershire beat Middlesex by 19 runs to progress to the Semi-Finals of the Twenty20 Cup

Defending champions Leicestershire Foxes reached their third successive appearances in the Twenty20 Cup semi-finals, after a fiery spell of bowling from South African Charl Willoughby helped them defend a potentially low target. Batting first, all the Leicestershire batsmen made reasonable contributions, but no one exceeded 40. With the help of 17 extras, Leicestershire finished on 159 for 6. However, Willoughby snared out three early wickets – finishing his spell of four overs with three for 11, including a rare maiden over – as Middlesex Crusaders crumbled to 16 for 3. When Jamie Dalrymple and Scott Styris threatened to win the game back with a partnership of 87, another South African, Claude Henderson rapped out two more wickets, and despite Styris being unbeaten on 73, Middlesex could only scamper 140 for 7. (Cricinfo scorecard)

=== Northamptonshire v Somerset (18 July) ===
Somerset beat Northamptonshire by four wickets to progress to the Semi-Finals of the Twenty20 Cup

Northamptonshire Steelbacks failed to take full use of their home advantage, and Somerset Sabres escaped with a four-wicket win to reach their first semi-final of the Twenty20 Cup. Northamptonshire's batsmen made quick scores between 20 and 30, but Ian Blackwell's spell mid-match of three for 16 pegged Northamptonshire back to 118 for 6. Ben Phillips then made an unbeaten 27 to lift his team to 154 for 8, however, but he couldn't take a wicket while bowling. Despite three run-outs, Somerset made it through on the penultimate ball, as Matthew Wood recorded 58 and Blackwell a 16-ball 31 to lay the foundation before Keith Parsons set the pace late on with an unbeaten 38. (Cricinfo scorecard)

=== Surrey v Warwickshire (18 July) ===
Match tied (D/L Method); Surrey won 4–3 in a bowl-out and progress to the Semi-Finals of the Twenty20 Cup

In an incredible finish to the knock-out quarter-final between Surrey Lions and Warwickshire Bears, the match was tied, so the players had to resort to a bowl-off – cricket's version of a penalty shootout, in which five players have two attempts at bowling at unguarded stumps, and if the stumps fall down, that was one point for their team. Surrey opened the batting in this match at The Oval, having been put in to bat by the Bears' captain Nick Knight. It was a shaky effort, often interrupted by wickets, and part-timer Jonathan Trott snared two wickets for 19 – admittedly tail-enders Ian Salisbury and Tim Murtagh. Mark Ramprakash, however, hit an unbeaten run-a-ball 34 to guide Surrey to 149 for 8, well below a par score. Warwickshire's innings then began under heavy cloud cover that assisted the Surrey swing bowlers. After Neil Carter went first ball, Warwickshire struggled in the rain, and the bad weather eventually stopped play just before five overs was played – so that, if the players couldn't return, the match would be declared a no-result. However, the rain gave way reasonably quickly, and quick hitting from Trevor Penney in particular – who made 20 off 12 balls before being caught off a ball from Rikki Clarke closed down the deficit.

With five overs being cut off the Warwickshire chase, they needed 118 from 15 overs, and they had got to 115 for 8 with one ball remaining and Dewald Pretorius and an injured Heath Streak, who had not bowled, at the crease. The umpires consulted, and were uncertain about what would happen if Warwickshire scored two – which, in the event, happened. As the par scores under Duckworth-Lewis were level, the captains agreed to have a bowl-off (alternatively the umpires could have forced a bowl-off or decided the game on a toss of the coin). After five players had tried to get the stumps down, both teams had managed the feat twice, and now a sudden death style bowl-off followed. The next player from each side managed to get the stumps down once each, so the score was now 3–3, but Warwickshire's Heath Streak missed both his attempts and Tim Murtagh got the stumps down and won the match for the hosts by 4–3. (Cricinfo scorecard)

== Semi-finals ==
On 30 July, The Oval:

=== Lancashire v Surrey (30 July) ===
Lancashire won by 20 runs and qualified for the Twenty20 Cup final

In the first of two semi-finals at The Oval on the Twenty20 Cup finals day, Lancashire Lightning lived up to expectations by smashing 217 for 4 in twenty overs against Surrey Lions – well helped by eleven wides and six penalty runs, although Lancashire's top five all contributed. Only Nayan Doshi came away with some face on the bowling side, taking two for 35, but with Andrew Flintoff making 49 and Andrew Symonds an unbeaten 52 the target quickly reached dangerously high levels – from a Surrey perspective, anyway.

Ali Brown and James Benning started well with an opening partnership of 93, as Dominic Cork and James Anderson were taken for runs, but Benning, Scott Newman, Brown and Rikki Clarke fell in quick succession to see Surrey struggle at 104 for 4. Mark Ramprakash and Azhar Mahmood upped the ante again, but when Flintoff and Anderson broke through with one wicket each, and Surrey crumbled to 195 for 7. (Cricinfo scorecard)

=== Leicestershire v Somerset (30 July) ===
Somerset won by four runs and progress to the Twenty20 Cup final

Defending champions Leicestershire Foxes failed to take care of an excellent position against Somerset Sabres, as the second semi-final became a low-scoring, yet thrilling affair. After Dinesh Mongia had taken three for 30 to set Somerset back to 139 for 7 after Graeme Smith (with 29), Matthew Wood (38) and Marcus Trescothick (25) had lifted them to 89 for 1 at one point during the innings. Carl Gazzard, Somerset's young wicketkeeper, made 26 to lift them to a final total of 157 for 9.

In reply, Darren Maddy and HD Ackerman lifted Leicestershire to 74 for no loss after eight overs, requiring "only" 83 from the last twelve. However, Ian Blackwell took three quick wickets to send Leicestershire to 90 for 3, Richard Johnson (figures of 3–0–21–3), Keith Parsons (3–0–15–0) and Wes Durston (3–0–18–1) bowled tightly to frustrate the Leicestershire batsmen, and despite a last-ball six from Paul Nixon, Somerset won by four runs and qualified for the final, where they would be facing Lancashire Lightning. (Cricinfo scorecard)

== Final ==
On 30 July, The Oval

=== Lancashire v Somerset (30 July) ===
Somerset beat Lancashire by seven wickets and won the 2005 Twenty20 Cup

Somerset Sabres completed their run by springing the final upset to beat Lancashire Lightning in the Twenty20 Cup final. It should perhaps have been renamed Sixteen16, because rain earlier in the day delayed the schedule and meant that the final had been shortened to 16 overs a side, while the semi-finals had both been 20 overs. However, Somerset did not mind – their strongest batsmen were their numbers one and two, Graeme Smith and Marcus Trescothick, and the more relative impact these two would have, the better for the Sabres. Their task was made easier, though, as Somerset fast bowler Andy Caddick dug out a couple of early Lancashire wickets, which was followed a run-out and two wickets in two balls from Richard Johnson, as Lancashire crawled to 41 for 5.

Australian-born Stuart Law stood tall at the crease, defying the Somerset bowlers to make 59 before being run out on the very last ball, but Somerset only needed 115 from 16 overs – a run rate of 7.19. Smith and Trescothick started positively, before Trescothick's England team-mate Andrew Flintoff had him edge behind to Warren Hegg for 10. With two more wickets falling, Lancashire would perhaps have fancied their chances with the Somerset score on 65 for 3, but Smith defied them with an unbeaten 64, adding 53 in a fourth-wicket stand with young James Hildreth to guide Somerset to the target with seven wickets and eleven balls to spare. (Cricinfo scorecard)
