= Andrew Pratt =

English cricketer (born 1975)

Personal information
- Full name: Andrew Pratt
- Born: 4 March 1975 (age 51); Helmington Row, County Durham, England
- Nickname: The Claw
- Height: 5 ft 11 in (1.80 m)
- Batting: Left-handed
- Role: Wicket-keeper
- Relatives: Gary Pratt (brother)

Domestic team information
- Years: Team
- 1997–2004: Durham

Career statistics
Competition	FC	LA	T20
Matches	62	82	5
Runs scored	1,974	988	74
Batting average	21.69	20.58	14.80
100s/50s	–/10	–/4	–/–
Top score	93	86	35
Catches/stumpings	150/12	89/24	2/2
- Source: Cricinfo, 21 September 2023

Andrew Pratt (born 4 March 1975) is a former English cricketer. He was a left-handed batsman and a wicket-keeper for his team Durham for the seven years in which he played for them at first-class level.

Pratt ventured briefly into Twenty20 cricket in 2004, participating in the 2004 Twenty20 cup for Durham. He played in the Second XI championship in 2005 for Durham's second string side, thus going full-circle with his career, having originally played with Marylebone's Second XI along with his elder brother Neil. His other brother, the younger Gary has played cricket since 1998. In 2012 after 7 years away from the game Pratt returned to play cricket for his home town club Crook Town CC. He is now 1st team Captain and Head Junior coach at the Durham Cricket League Club and a member of the club committee.
