= Helmington Row =

Village in County Durham, England

Coordinates: 54.713°N 1.719°W

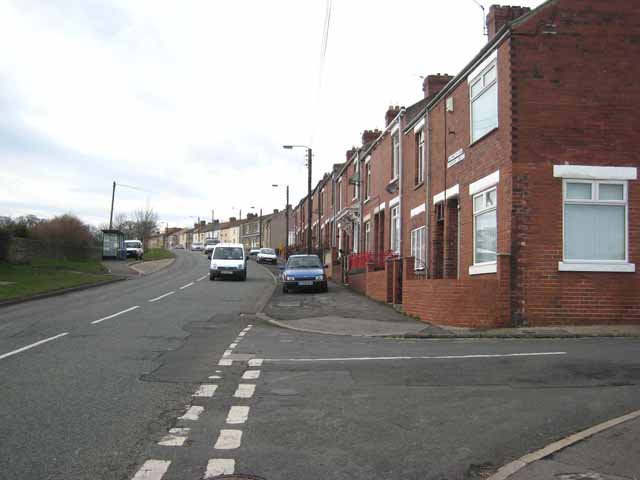
- General view of Helmington Row

- Location within County Durham
- Population: 228 (2001)
- OS grid reference: NZ182353
- Unitary authority: County Durham
- Ceremonial county: County Durham
- Region: North East
- Country: England
- Sovereign state: United Kingdom
- Post town: Darlington
- Postcode district: DL15
- Police: Durham
- Fire: County Durham and Darlington
- Ambulance: North East

Helmington Row is a small village in County Durham, England. It is situated between Crook and Willington, about 7 miles south-west of Durham and 3 miles north-north-west of Bishop Auckland.

It has its own park known locally as the Rec, and a petrol station. The village is on the main bus route from Crook to Durham. Crook Golf Club lies to the North of the village. The village itself consists of several terraced streets with the almost totally abandoned Bowden Close within its boundaries.

There are around 6 main streets in the main block of houses (3 of those are very popular, Church Street, East View and Russ Street), other streets are situated along the road (not counted). In the 2001 census Helmington Row had a population of 228. There are two sets of allotments where local people may grow their own fruit and vegetables and keep small amounts of livestock.

The village once boasted several pubs, The Bowden Inn, the Shoulder of Mutton, The Helmington Inn and the Colliery Inn. The latter has recently been renamed the Copper Mine.

It is also home to the 'field of dreams' which refers to a small football pitch used by locals of all ages. In the summer it is often occupied everyday and is the main attraction of the town.

== History ==
Helmington Row is believed to be of Medieval origins with a possible deserted medieval village being somewhere in the vicinity. The exact origins of this village are unknown, however, Helm is derived from the Old English word meaning Helmet or a place in which to govern from. The word "ton" refers to a Farm or a Hamlet.

In 1569 during the Northern Rebellion nine persons joined from Elmyden Rawe and two were executed and their bodies displayed in the village to deter future rebels.

Nearby is the remains of a Medieval Holy Well along Holywell Lane.

In 1877 the village was catered for by a Board School which closed sometime in the 1960s and was converted into residential dwellings.

Homelands Hospital was built here in 1903 as a fever hospital to treat diseases such as tuberculosis, typhus and smallpox. It later provided general health care until its closure in December 2004.

== Governance ==
Originally the boundaries of Helmington Row stretched down to the Crook Beck. Currently Helmington Row forms part of the Crook ward and its local government since 1 April 2009 is under the Durham County Council Unitary Authority replacing the former Wear Valley District Council.

Helmington-Row was formerly a township in the parish of Brancepeth, from 1866 Helmington Row was a civil parish in its own right, on 1 April 1937 the parish was abolished to form Crook and Willington. In 1931 the parish had a population of 4425.

== Transport ==
The village lies on the main bus route from Crook to Durham.

== Education ==
Primary Education is catered for via schools in Crook, Willington and Sunnybrow while secondary education is via Willington and Bishop Auckland.
