= Jon Lewis (cricketer, born 1970) =

English cricketer and coach

Jonathan James Benjamin Lewis (born 21 May 1970, Isleworth, Middlesex, England) is the current Batting Coach of Bangladesh.

He represented Essex (1990–1996; Cap 1995) and Durham (1997–2006, Captain 2001–2004) as a right-handed batsman and occasional right-arm medium fast bowler in 205 first-class matches. He scored 10,281 runs at an average of 31.92 with a highest score of 210. He scored 16 hundreds and 66 fifties.

He attended King Edward VI Grammar School, Chelmsford, Essex.

== Coaching ==
Lewis was appointed second team coach by Durham County Cricket Club. In June 2013 first team coach Geoff Cook suffered a heart attack and Lewis deputised, helping Durham to their third County Championship title win (Cook survived). Lewis was appointed first team coach on a full-time basis in December 2013.
