= Gary Pratt =

English cricketer and footballer

Personal information
- Full name: Gary Joseph Pratt
- Born: 22 December 1981 (age 44); Bishop Auckland, County Durham, England
- Nickname: Gonzo, Gazza, Gates
- Height: 5 ft 10 in (1.78 m)
- Batting: Left-handed
- Bowling: Right-arm off break
- Role: Batsman
- Relatives: Andrew Pratt (brother)

Domestic team information
- Years: Team
- 2000–2006: Durham (squad no. 16)
- FC debut: 19 July 2000 Durham v Lancashire
- Last FC: 7 June 2006 Durham v Warwickshire
- LA debut: 13 September 2001 Durham Cricket Board v Buckinghamshire
- Last LA: 25 June 2006 Durham v Derbyshire

Career statistics
Competition	FC	LA	T20
Matches	53	78	25
Runs scored	2,410	1,749	321
Batting average	25.91	31.80	14.59
100s/50s	1/15	1/11	0/1
Top score	150	101*	62*
Balls bowled	33	–	–
Wickets	0	–	–
Bowling average	–	–	–
5 wickets in innings	–	–	–
10 wickets in match	–	–	–
Best bowling	–	–	–
Catches/stumpings	31/0	31/0	8/0
- Source: CricketArchive, 5 September 2008

Gary Joseph Pratt (born 22 December 1981) is an English former professional cricketer, who played as a left-handed batsman but also bowled right-arm off breaks. He is best known for running out Australia captain Ricky Ponting having come on as a substitute fielder in the fourth Test in the 2005 Ashes.

Pratt performed well in his early career, picking up the NBC Denis Compton Award in 1999 as the most promising young player at Durham County Cricket Club, and scored a century for England Under-19s. He stayed on at Durham, scoring more than 1,000 first-class runs in 2003. He failed to match that form afterwards; he did not play a single first-class game in 2005 (although he famously appeared as a substitute fielder for England) and in August 2006, Durham announced that they had decided not to renew Pratt's contract. He has since appeared for Crook Town F.C. in a Northern League Division Two fixture against Brandon United F.C. He signed for Cumberland minor county cricket club for the 2007 cricket season.

== Statistics and records ==
Pratt's best year as a first-class cricketer was undoubtedly 2003, when he scored 1,055 runs. His highest score in first-class cricket is 150, achieved while batting for Durham against Northamptonshire at the Riverside Ground in 2003. His highest one-day score is 101*, achieved for Durham versus Somerset at Taunton in 2003.

== Ponting run out ==
Pratt is most famous for his run out of Australian captain Ricky Ponting at Trent Bridge in the 2005 Ashes series. Brought on to field as a substitute, Pratt was fielding at cover when Damien Martyn tapped the ball in his direction and attempted a quick single. Pratt duly threw down the stumps at the striker's end with Ponting considerably short of his ground. This moment is remembered as one of the most important turning points during the series, with Ponting looking well set for a big score at the time. The dismissal prompted an angry outburst from the batsman, who was seen shouting up at the England balcony towards Duncan Fletcher, unhappy at England's frequent use of substitute fielders during the series. Ironically, although England may have used substitute fielders to rest bowlers between spells, this appearance by Pratt was not among them: he was replacing Simon Jones, who had been taken to hospital with an ankle injury; it was to be Jones' last test. The run out earned Pratt a place on the open top bus parade following the series victory.

Since the incident, Pratt has acquired a small following of grateful English fans. He had the dubious honour of having the pavilion in Sky Sports' Cricket AM named the 'Gary Pratt Pavilion'. England fan organisation the Barmy Army planned to fly Pratt out to Australia for the 2006–07 Ashes series as a good-luck charm, but failed to find sponsorship for his plane fare.

Pratt felt that the event that thrust him into the cricketing limelight was also the one that quickened his dramatic fall from grace, ignoring his skill with the bat: "I was just known for fielding afterwards, and I didn't really want that." As of 2010 he was working at a cricketing equipment shop and as of 2021 skippers Cumberland, where he has scored ten Championship hundreds.
