= James Lowe (cricketer) =

English cricketer

Personal information
- Full name: James Adam Lowe
- Born: 4 November 1982 (age 44); Bury St Edmunds, Suffolk, England
- Nickname: Lowey, J-Lo
- Height: 6 ft 2 in (188 cm)
- Batting: Right-handed
- Bowling: Right-arm off break
- Role: Batsman, Wicket-keeper

Domestic team information
- Years: Team
- 2003–2006: Durham
- FC debut: 4 June 2003 Durham v Hampshire
- LA debut: 7 August 2005 Durham v Bangladesh A
- Source: Cricinfo, 28 May 2024

James Lowe (born 4 November 1982) is a former English cricketer. He was a right-handed opening batsman and part time off-spin bowler who played for Durham. He was born in Bury St Edmunds but moved to Northallerton in North Yorkshire at an early age.

Lowe made his first-class debut vs Hampshire in 2003 making an impressive 80 before being trapped lbw by Wasim Akram. He was next part of the Durham side which beat Yorkshire by 210 runs in 2004 at Scarborough scoring 31 and 41 in the match. However Lowe went on to play only 9 First class matches over 4 seasons between 2003 and 2006 never surpassing the score of 80 he made on debut.

After being released by Durham at the end of the 2006 season Lowe played minor counties cricket for Cumberland and was part of the side that won the 2012 National Counties Knockout Cup beating Wiltshire by 7 wickets at Wormsley.

Following his short career as a player Lowe became a coach firstly working in the junior pathway at Durham before being appointed EPP Head Coach in 2014 and progressing to become Durham Academy Assistant coach in 2017. In March 2022 Lowe ended his long association with Durham and was appointed Academy Head Coach at Yorkshire County Cricket Club.
