= Gary Scott (cricketer) =

English cricketer (born 1984)

Gary Michael Scott (born 21 July 1984 in Sunderland) is an English cricketer. A right-handed upper-order batsman, Scott is the youngest ever first-class player for Durham, debuting in 2001 aged 17 years and 19 days.

Scott made 16 first-class appearances in 2005 and 2006 but in Durham's successful 2007 and 2008 seasons he failed to play a single first team game and was subsequently released.
