= Gareth Breese =

Jamaican cricketer (born 1976)

Personal information
- Full name: Gareth Rohan Breese
- Born: 9 January 1976 (age 50); Montego Bay, Saint James Parish, Jamaica
- Nickname: Briggy
- Height: 5 ft 8 in (1.73 m)
- Batting: Right-handed
- Bowling: Right-arm off break
- Role: All-rounder
- Relatives: Jean "Binta" Breeze (mother)

International information
- National side: West Indies
- Only Test (cap 244): 17 October 2002 v India

Domestic team information
- Years: Team
- 1996–2006: Jamaica
- 2004–2014: Durham (squad no. 70)

Career statistics
Competition	Test	FC	LA	T20
Matches	1	125	188	106
Runs scored	5	4,693	2,206	765
Batting average	2.50	26.36	21.62	15.30
100s/50s	0/0	4/28	0/4	0/0
Top score	5	165*	68*	37
Balls bowled	188	18,825	6,944	1,778
Wickets	2	287	195	93
Bowling average	67.50	30.26	27.97	21.56
5 wickets in innings	0	12	2	0
10 wickets in match	0	3	0	0
Best bowling	2/108	7/60	5/41	4/14
Catches/stumpings	1/–	114/–	73/–	40/–
- Source: CricketArchive, 25 August 2015

Gareth Rohan Breese (born 9 January 1976) is a West Indian cricketer. Born in Montego Bay, St James, Jamaica, he attended Wolmer's Boys School in Kingston. Breese played as a right-arm offspinner.

== Career ==
He played one Test match in 2002, as a spin bowler in Chennai against India. Breese scored five runs in two innings, and took two wickets, but conceded 135 runs in 31 overs.

Breese featured for over 100 first class games for Jamaica and Durham. He played for Durham from 2004 until 2014, qualifying as a non-overseas player due to owning a British passport. With 31 wickets, he was the third highest wicket-taker for Durham in 2005, as the team was promoted from Division Two in the County Championship. As a batsman he hit several half-centuries, at number seven and eight in the batting order, which helped Durham to several victories, such as an unbeaten 79 at Taunton as Durham chased 243 to win after Breese had come in at 98 for 4.

With Durham Breese went on to win the 2007 Friends Provident Trophy by a margin of 125 runs over Hampshire in the final at Lord's. He also scored the winning runs for Durham in the 2014 Royal London One-Day Cup final against Warwickshire at Lord's in what was his final appearance with the club.

== Personal life ==
Breese is the son of Jean "Binta" Breeze, Jamaican dub poet and storyteller who was acknowledged as the first woman to write and perform dub poetry.

== See also ==
- One Test Wonder
