= Nicky Peng =

English cricketer

Nicky Peng (born Nicky Peng Gillender on 18 September 1982) is a former English cricketer. He was a right-handed batsman and off-spin bowler.

Born in Northumberland and educated at the Royal Grammar School, Newcastle, Peng is a graduate of the Durham Cricket Academy, who was given his chance at cricket after impressing at Chelmsford. In 2000, he became the youngest Durham player to participate in the County Championship, and on his debut in the same year he made 98 runs, since bested by an innings of 139 against Sunderland.

He represented England Under-19s in the 1999 European championship, and against Sri Lanka in 2000, and the next year was voted Durham's Young Player of the Year. However, having lost his first-team place in 2005 he accepted a contract to join Glamorgan.

Peng played 79 first-class matches during his career and scored 3200 runs, with a highest score of 158, at an average of 23.70.

In July 2007, he announced his immediate retirement from all forms of first-class cricket. He said of the decision, "This season I have lost confidence and belief in my ability despite trying 100%. It is not working for me or for the team and consequently I have stopped enjoying the game."
