= Adam Warren (cricketer) =

Australian-born English cricketer (born 1975)

Personal information
- Full name: Adam Craig Warren
- Born: 2 July 1975 (age 51); Hobart, Tasmania, Australia
- Batting: Right-handed
- Bowling: Right-arm medium fast
- Role: Bowler

Domestic team information
- Years: Team
- 2001–2002: New South Wales Second XI
- 2004: Derbyshire Second XI
- 2004: Yorkshire Second XI
- 2005: Yorkshire
- 2005–2006: Victoria Bushrangers Second XI

Adam Craig Warren (born 2 July 1975, Hobart, Tasmania, Australia) is an English first-class cricketer.

Warren played one List A one day match and two Twenty20 matches for Yorkshire County Cricket Club in 2005. He also played for the Yorkshire Second XI, the Derbyshire Second XI in 2004, the Northamptonshire Second XI in 2005 and for Lancashire Second XI in 2006. He played for New South Wales Second XI in 2001/02 and for Victoria Second XI in 2005/06.

A right arm medium fast bowler, he took 1 for 35 against Leicestershire and scored three runs. He took 2 for 32 against Durham, and 2 for 38 against Leicestershire in his Twenty20 games.
