= Neil Killeen =

English cricketer (born 1975)

Personal information
- Born: 17 October 1975 (age 51); Shotley Bridge, Durham, England
- Nickname: Killer
- Batting: Right-handed
- Bowling: Right-arm medium fast
- Role: Bowler
- Relatives: Mitchell Killeen (son)

Domestic team information
- Years: Team
- 1992–2010: Durham (squad no. 77)

Career statistics
| Competition | FC | LA | T20 |
|---|---|---|---|
| Matches | 102 | 226 | 45 |
| Runs scored | 1302 | 700 | 88 |
| Batting average | 11.42 | 9.45 | 17.60 |
| 100s/50s | 0/0 | 0/0 | 0/0 |
| Top score | 48 | 32 | 17* |
| Balls bowled | 16499 | 10631 | 933 |
| Wickets | 262 | 304 | 47 |
| Bowling average | 31.35 | 24.26 | 24.27 |
| 5 wickets in innings | 9 | 5 | 0 |
| 10 wickets in match | 0 | 0 | 0 |
| Best bowling | 7/70 | 6/31 | 4/7 |
| Catches/stumpings | 26/– | 38/– | 9/– |
- Source: CricketArchive, 4 September 2010

Neil Killeen (born 17 October 1975) is an English coach and former cricketer. During his playing career played for Durham County Cricket Club, Marylebone Cricket Club and Combined Universities. As of January 2023 he is the fast-bowling coach for the England national side.

He began playing cricket aged ten, at Annfield Plain Cricket Club, playing at the various age groups and represented Durham at all ages and levels including first-class. He began his career with Durham as a schoolboy in 1992, when he was selected for the first team squad on a tour to Zimbabwe. He signed on a full contract with the club in 1995. He made his first-class debut in 1995 against the West Indies and he was awarded his county cap in 1999. He toured the Caribbean with Young England in 1994/95, and toured with the M.C.C. in 2000.

He was best known for his exploits in the one-day game and is Durham's leading wicket-taker in the format, taking 298 wickets in 221 games. He played his last game for Durham against the Kent Spitfires in a Clydesdale Bank 40 match on 4 September 2010, taking 3 wickets in a 31 run defeat.

He moved from playing into coaching in 2011, spending 12 years with Durham before being appointed Elite pace bowling coach by England in January 2023.
