= Gordon Muchall =

English cricketer

Personal information
- Full name: Gordon James Muchall
- Born: 2 December 1982 (age 43); Newcastle upon Tyne, England
- Height: 6 ft 0 in (1.83 m)
- Batting: Right-handed
- Bowling: Right-arm medium
- Role: Batsman
- Relatives: Paul Muchall (brother)

Domestic team information
- Years: Team
- 2001: Durham Cricket Board
- 2002–2016: Durham (squad no. 24)
- FC debut: 19 April 2002 Durham v Middlesex
- LA debut: 13 September 2001 Durham CB v Buckinghamshire

Career statistics
Competition	FC	LA	T20
Matches	163	150	111
Runs scored	7,947	3,519	1,975
Batting average	29.98	34.16	30.85
100s/50s	14/39	1/20	0/5
Top score	219	101*	66*
Balls bowled	956	208	12
Wickets	15	2	1
Bowling average	43.80	84.00	8.00
5 wickets in innings	0	0	0
10 wickets in match	0	0	0
Best bowling	3/26	1/15	1/8
Catches/stumpings	117/–	55/–	38/–
- Source: CricInfo, 5 April 2017

Gordon Muchall (born 2 November 1982) is a former English professional cricketer. He was a right-handed batsman and a right arm medium pace bowler. He was born in Newcastle upon Tyne and played for Durham County Cricket Club for the entire duration of his career before retiring at the end of the 2016 season.

He made his first-class debut in 2002 for Durham against Middlesex. He represented England Under-19's, and was a member of the first England Academy squad.

He was awarded his county cap in 2005.
