= James Bryant (South African cricketer) =

South African cricketer

Personal information
- Full name: James Douglas Campbell Bryant
- Born: 4 February 1976 (age 50); Durban, Natal, South Africa
- Batting: Right-handed
- Bowling: Right-arm

Domestic team information
- Years: Team
- 1996/97–2003/04: Eastern Province
- 2003: Somerset
- 2004–2005: Derbyshire

Career statistics
Competition	FC	LA	T20
Matches	83	87	9
Runs scored	4,288	2,064	181
Batting average	32.24	28.66	30.16
100s/50s	8/20	1/14	0/1
Top score	234*	105*	53*
Balls bowled	38	–	–
Wickets	1	–	–
Bowling average	37.00	–	–
5 wickets in innings	0	–	–
10 wickets in match	0	–	–
Best bowling	1/22	–	–
Catches/stumpings	55/–	15/–	4/–
- Source: CricketArchive, 21 December 2015

James Douglas Campbell Bryant (born 4 February 1976) is a former South African cricketer. He played first-class cricket for nine years, for Eastern Province, Nottinghamshire, Somerset and Derbyshire, retiring from senior cricket in 2005.

A superb hitter in his own country, with a high score of 234 not out, he seemed to struggle more than he should have in England, where his game suffered from a lack of confidence. On his Derbyshire debut he broke his hand, and after his recovery was never able to replicate his big-hitting in the English county game. His first class career was dealt a second blow when he dislocated his shoulder in 2005.

His frequent injuries as well as his poor form meant that it was unlikely that he is going to be signed by another English county team, however Bryant continued to play in England, and between 2006 and 2008 was signed as a professional for three-time Village Cricket Champions Troon playing in Cornwall League Division 1.
