= Somerset County Cricket Club in 2009 =

Events of the 2009 cricket season

Somerset County Cricket Club
2009 season
- Coach: Andy Hurry
- Captain: Justin Langer
- Overseas player: Justin Langer (Australia)
- County Championship: Division One, 3rd
- Friends Provident Trophy: Quarter-final
- NatWest Pro40: Division One, 2nd
- Twenty20 Cup: Runners-up
- Most runs: Marcus Trescothick (1,817)
- Most wickets: Charl Willoughby (54)
- Most catches: Marcus Trescothick (21)
- Most wicket-keeping dismissals: Craig Kieswetter (48)

Somerset County Cricket Club competed in four domestic competitions during the 2009 English cricket season: the first division of the County Championship, the Friends Provident Trophy, the first division of the NatWest Pro40 League and the Twenty20 Cup. Through their performance in the Twenty20 Cup, the team qualified for the Champions League Twenty20. They enjoyed a successful season, but fell short of winning any competitions, prompting Director of Cricket Brian Rose to say "We've had enough of being cricket's nearly men."

Consistent performances in the County Championship helped Somerset remain challengers for the competition until the last few weeks of the season, but the batting-friendly pitch at their home ground, the County Ground, Taunton, meant that the county finished with too many draws to claim their first Championship title. Consistency was also key for Somerset's success in one-day cricket, where they remained unbeaten in the group stage of the Friends Provident Trophy, but were eliminated in the first knock-out round, and finished runners-up by one point in the NatWest Pro40. In the Twenty20 Cup, Somerset finished as losing finalists. This meant that they qualified for the Champions League Twenty20, where they progressed into the second group stage of the competition. They failed to win any matches in that phase of the competition, resulting in their elimination.

Somerset were captained for the third successive season by their Australian overseas player, Justin Langer, who announced during the season that it would be his last with Somerset. Marcus Trescothick topped the national batting tables, scoring almost 3,000 runs in all competitions in 2009; as a result, he was named as both Professional Cricketers' Association (PCA) Player of the Year and the PCA's Most Valuable Player of the Year.

== Background ==
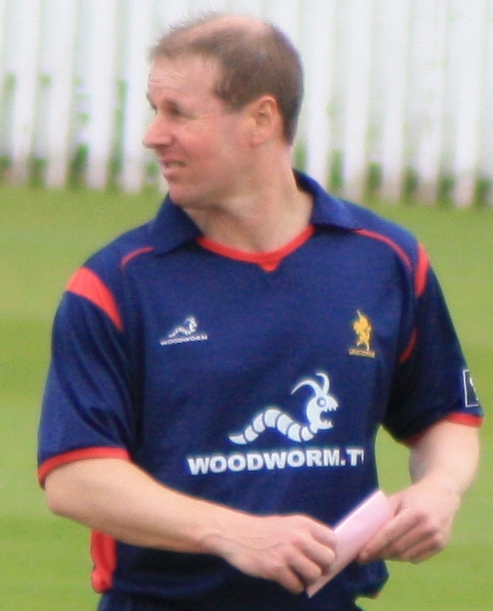
Keith Parsons, one of Somerset's most successful all-rounders, retired prior to the 2009 season.

After promotion from the second division of the County Championship in 2007, Somerset were among the first division title contenders in the 2008 County Championship. A loss to Lancashire in the final match of the season meant they finished in fourth place. David Foot, writing in Wisden, claimed that too many of the Somerset batsmen had "lost their way" in one-day cricket, as they narrowly avoided relegation in the NatWest Pro40, and were eliminated in the Friends Provident Trophy.

Somerset promoted four players from their academy for the 2009 season, giving contracts to Jos Buttler, Adam Dibble, Chris Jones and James Burke. Of these, only Buttler appeared in the first-team during the season. They also signed David Stiff, a fast bowler capped at Under-19 level for England, on a two-month contract at the beginning of the season, which was later extended to the end of the season. Ian Blackwell, captain of the side in 2005 and 2006, left for Durham after coach Andy Hurry and captain Justin Langer made it clear that they regarded fitness as a priority. John Francis and Keith Parsons both retired at the end of 2008, Francis cited lack of first-team opportunities for his departure, while at the age of 35, Parsons declared that: "There comes a time when your body tells you it's time to pack in professional sport."

In his preview of the 2009 season for ESPNcricinfo, Andrew McGlashan identified Somerset's opening partnerships with bat and ball as their main strengths, but predicted that the middle order would struggle to make an impact in the County Championship, stating that "none [of the middle order] jump out as potential match-winners in four-day cricket." He speculated that the team's best chance of success would come in the one-day competitions. The Daily Telegraph provided a more positive outlook, claiming that the county had "enough depth in batting and seam bowling to challenge [for the County Championship] again." They identified spin bowling as an area of weakness following the departure of Blackwell. Bob Willis, writing in The Guardian, shared this view, and predicted that Somerset would also be hindered by the difficulty of getting 20 wickets at home, resulting in too many draws.

== Squad ==
The following players made at least one appearance for Somerset in first-class, List A or Twenty20 cricket in 2009. (Note: Player list generated from lists in the Somerset County Cricket Club and Somerset Cricket Board Yearbook 2009/10.) Age given is at the start of Somerset's first match of the season (15 April 2009).

Batsmen
Name	Nationality	Birth date	Batting style	Bowling style	Ref
James Hildreth	England	9 September 1984 (aged 24)	Right-handed	Right arm medium-fast	
Justin Langer (captain)	Australia	21 November 1970 (aged 38)	Left-handed	Right arm medium pace	
Marcus Trescothick	England	25 December 1975 (aged 33)	Left-handed	Right arm medium pace	

All-rounders
Name	Nationality	Birth date	Batting style	Bowling style	Ref
Omari Banks	West Indies	17 July 1982 (aged 26)	Right-handed	Right arm off break	
Zander de Bruyn	South Africa	8 September 1975 (aged 33)	Right-handed	Right arm fast-medium	
Wes Durston	England	6 October 1980 (aged 28)	Right-handed	Right arm off break	
Ben Phillips	England	30 September 1974 (aged 34)	Right-handed	Right arm fast-medium	
Arul Suppiah	Malaysia	30 August 1983 (aged 25)	Right-handed	Slow left-arm orthodox	
Alfonso Thomas	South Africa	9 February 1977 (aged 32)	Right-handed	Right arm fast-medium	
Peter Trego	England	12 June 1981 (aged 27)	Right-handed	Right arm medium pace	

Wicket-keepers
Name	Nationality	Birth date	Batting style	Bowling style	Ref
Jos Buttler	England	8 September 1990 (aged 18)	Right-handed	—	
Carl Gazzard	England	15 April 1982 (aged 27)	Right-handed	—	
Craig Kieswetter	England	28 November 1987 (aged 21)	Right-handed	—	

Bowlers
Name	Nationality	Birth date	Batting style	Bowling style	Ref
Andy Caddick	England	21 November 1968 (aged 40)	Right-handed	Right arm fast-medium	
Michael Munday	England	22 October 1984 (aged 24)	Right-handed	Right arm leg break	
David Stiff	England	20 October 1984 (aged 24)	Right-handed	Right arm fast	
Mark Turner	England	23 October 1984 (aged 24)	Right-handed	Right arm medium-fast	
Max Waller	England	3 March 1988 (aged 21)	Right-handed	Right arm leg break	
Charl Willoughby	South Africa	3 December 1974 (aged 34)	Left-handed	Left arm fast-medium	

== County Championship ==
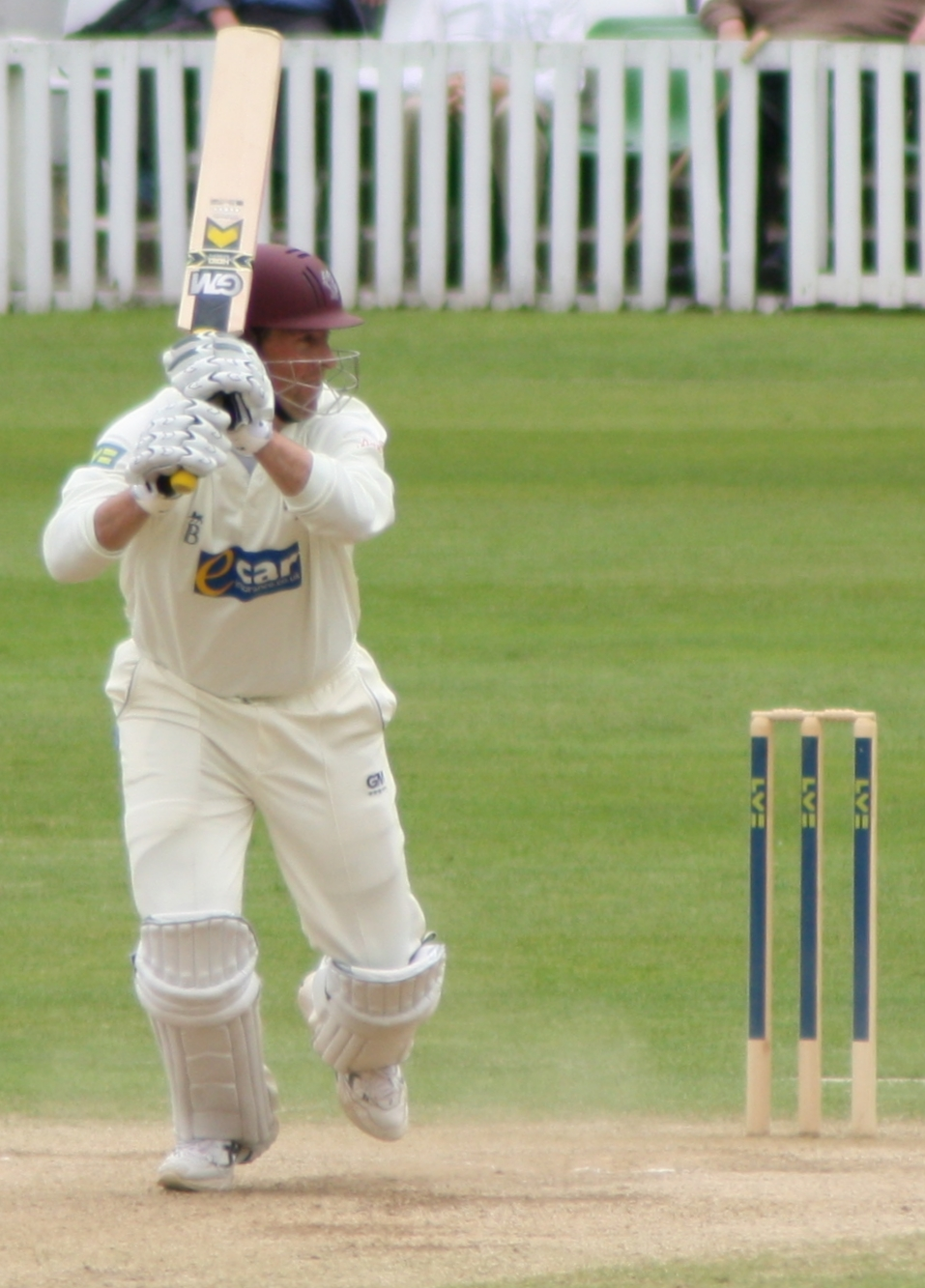
Marcus Trescothick finished the season with 1,817 first-class runs.

Although Marcus Trescothick had a season which David Foot described as "imperiously assured", Somerset failed to win enough matches to pose a real challenge in the 2009 County Championship. The flat pitch at the County Ground, Taunton did not help their efforts; the imbalance in favour of the batsmen meant that all but one match at the ground was drawn. Sussex's total of 742/5 (Note: 742/5 indicates that Sussex scored 742 runs, and lost five wickets in their innings.) declared was the fifteenth highest total in the history of the County Championship, while Murray Goodwin's innings of 344 not out in that match was the sixth highest score by a batsman in the history of the competition. In total, six of Somerset's eight home matches contained scores of 500 or over in a single innings. (Note: For individual match scorecards see) In contrast, 500 was reached in only one of their away matches, by Hampshire at The Rose Bowl. The home conditions helped three of Somerset's batsmen pass 1,000 first-class runs in the season, including Craig Kieswetter and Arul Suppiah, who were both awarded their county caps after passing the landmark. Trescothick's 1,817 runs were the most by any batsman in the 2009 competition, finishing over 200 runs ahead of the next most prolific batsman, and he was named as both PCA Player of the Year and the PCA's Most Valuable Player of the Year for 2009. He was also selected as part of the team of the year, along with wicket-keeper Kieswetter.

In contrast to the strong batting line-up, Foot suggested that Somerset "lacked a seam bowler to compensate for Andy Caddick's withdrawal". Caddick – who made his first-class debut for Somerset in 1991 – only played five matches in 2009, and announced his intention to retire at the end of the season. He took ten wickets in 2009, and finished his career as Somerset's sixth highest wicket-taker of all time. This placed the majority of the wicket-taking burden upon Charl Willoughby, the South African fast-medium pace bowler. He responded well, and took 54 wickets in the County Championship, more than any other bowler in the first division. He was aided by seam bowlers David Stiff, who returned to the first-class game for the first time since 2006, and Alfonso Thomas. Stiff took 31 wickets, more than quadrupling his career first-class wicket total, and Thomas took 35, his highest return in an English domestic season. Somerset lacked an effective spin bowler in 2009 following the departure of Ian Blackwell the previous season, and the spinners combined only claimed 31 wickets, bowling less balls between them than Willoughby alone.

Somerset began their season by playing out a high-scoring draw at home against Warwickshire, in which both teams reached 500 in their first innings. James Hildreth scored a triple-century, reaching the milestone earlier in an English season than any player previously, and became the first English player to pass 300 runs in an innings for Somerset since Harold Gimblett in 1948. In contrast, Somerset had to battle back for a draw in their second match. After Durham scored 543 in their first innings, Somerset collapsed to 69 all out in reply; only Langer passed 20 runs, while six of his batting colleagues made ducks. After being forced to follow-on, Trescothick, Langer and Kieswetter all scored centuries to secure a draw. Somerset's third match resulted in their only loss of the County Championship season, coming against Nottinghamshire at Trent Bridge; and at the end of May, they were second bottom in the first division. Their next match finished in a draw against Lancashire, a result which was always likely after the first day was lost to rain. Somerset next picked up victories against Yorkshire and Sussex before scoring the second-highest ever fourth innings winning total in the County Championship to beat Yorkshire at Taunton. These three wins propelled Somerset to third in the competition at the start of July, and they did not drop below this position for the remainder of the season.

In each of their following two matches, at home against Hampshire and away to Worcestershire, Somerset batted first and then enforced the follow-on after bowling their opponents out cheaply. In each their opponents managed to avoid defeat, and both matches resulted in draws. During the Worcestershire match, Langer's first innings 107 took him past Sir Donald Bradman's total of 28,067 first-class runs to become the highest-scoring Australian batsman. Successive draws against Nottinghamshire, Warwickshire, Sussex and Hampshire meant that Somerset travelled to Durham requiring a victory to maintain any realistic hopes of claiming the County Championship title. No play was possible on the third and fourth days, and the match resulted in another draw, leaving Somerset with only a slim mathematical chance of the title. Another draw, against Lancashire, while Durham beat Nottinghamshire, meant that Durham clinched the title. Somerset drew with Worcestershire (their ninth draw in a row in the competition), and finished third in the first division.

=== Season standings ===
Key: Pld = Played, W = Wins, L = Losses, D = Draws, T = Ties, A = Abandonments, Bat = Batting points, Bwl = Bowling points, Adj = Adjustments/Penalties, Pts = Points.

County Championship: Division One
Team	Pld	W	L	D	T	A	Bat	Bwl	Adj	Pts
Durham (C)	16	8	0	8	0	0	49	48	−1	240
Nottinghamshire	16	4	2	10	0	0	56	41	0	193
Somerset	16	3	1	12	0	0	50	43	−1	182
Lancashire	16	4	2	10	0	0	35	44	0	175
Warwickshire	16	3	3	10	0	0	54	38	0	174
Hampshire	16	3	3	10	0	0	50	40	−3	169
Yorkshire	16	2	2	12	0	0	46	44	0	166
Sussex (R)	16	2	6	8	0	0	45	39	−1	143
Worcestershire (R)	16	0	10	6	0	0	30	40	0	94

Adjustments:
Hampshire deducted 3 points for a slow over-rate in their match against Worcestershire.
Durham deducted 1 point for a slow over-rate in their match against Sussex.
Somerset deducted 1 point for a slow over-rate in their match against Durham.
Sussex deducted 1 point for a slow over-rate in their match against Worcestershire.
Notes:
Team marked (C) won the County Championship.
Teams marked (R) were relegated to Division Two of the County Championship.

=== Match log and statistics ===
Match log
No.	Date	Opponents	Venue	Result	Ref
1	15–18 April	Warwickshire	County Ground, Taunton	Drawn	
2	28 April–1 May	Durham	County Ground, Taunton	Drawn	
3	6–9 May	Nottinghamshire	Trent Bridge, Nottingham	Lost by 6 wickets	
4	6–9 June	Lancashire	Old Trafford, Manchester	Drawn	
5	11–14 June	Yorkshire	Headingley, Leeds	Won by 4 wickets	
6	16–19 June	Sussex	County Ground, Hove	Won by 35 runs	
7	30 June–3 July	Yorkshire	County Ground, Taunton	Won by 4 wickets	
8	10–13 July	Hampshire	County Ground, Taunton	Drawn	
9	21–24 July	Worcestershire	New Road, Worcester	Drawn	
10	31 July–3 August	Nottinghamshire	County Ground, Taunton	Drawn	
11	5–8 August	Warwickshire	Edgbaston, Birmingham	Drawn	
12	19–22 August	Sussex	County Ground, Taunton	Drawn	
13	27–30 August	Hampshire	The Rose Bowl, Southampton	Drawn	
14	1–4 September	Durham	Riverside, Chester-le-Street	Drawn	
15	9–12 September	Lancashire	County Ground, Taunton	Drawn	
16	16–19 September	Worcestershire	County Ground, Taunton	Drawn	

Batting averages
Player	Matches	Innings	Runs	Average	Highest score	100s	50s
Marcus Trescothick	16	26	1,817	75.70	146	8	9
Craig Kieswetter	16	24	1,242	59.14	153	4	7
Arul Suppiah	16	26	1,201	48.04	151	3	6
James Hildreth	15	23	934	44.47	303*	2	4
Justin Langer	15	21	831	43.73	122*	2	4
Peter Trego	16	23	610	33.88	103*	1	5
Zander de Bruyn	16	25	686	31.18	106	1	6
Qualification: 500 runs. Source: ESPNcricinfo

Bowling averages
Player	Matches	Innings	Wickets	Average	BBI	BBM	5wi
Charl Willoughby	16	26	54	30.03	5/56	7/170	3
David Stiff	10	18	31	36.12	5/91	5/93	1
Alfonso Thomas	14	22	35	37.62	5/53	8/152	1
Ben Phillips	7	11	12	38.00	4/46	4/73	0
Arul Suppiah	16	19	15	45.46	3/58	5/85	0
Peter Trego	16	25	19	46.78	3/53	3/74	0
Andy Caddick	5	8	10	52.50	3/53	4/95	0
Qualification: 10 wickets. Source: ESPNcricinfo

== Friends Provident Trophy ==
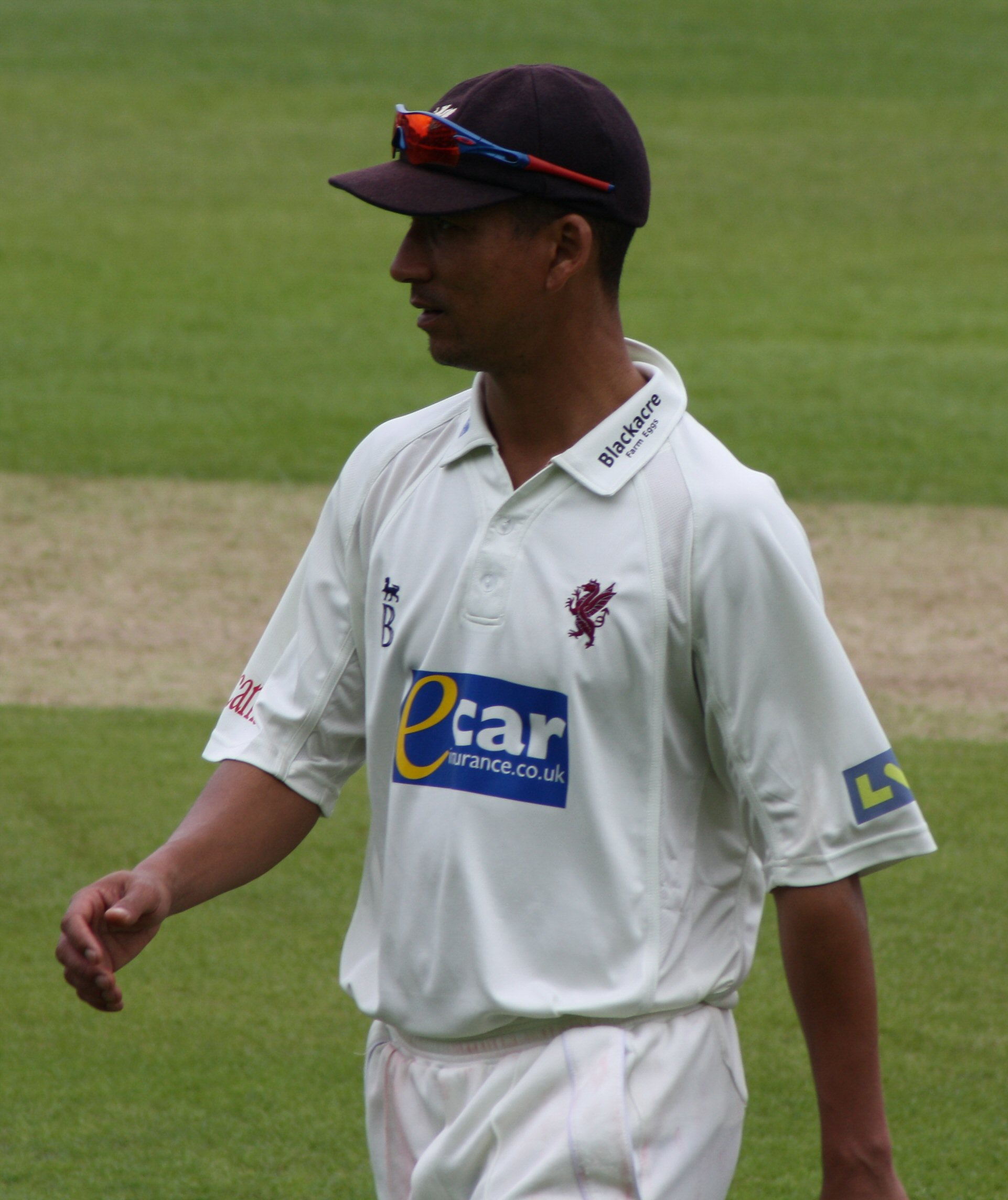
Alfonso Thomas was joint leading wicket-taker in the 2009 Friends Provident Trophy with 20 wickets.

In the 2009 Friends Provident Trophy, the first one-day competition in the English domestic calendar, Somerset showed a marked improvement from the previous season. They were described by Steve James, writing in Wisden, as "the most impressive qualifiers" from the group stage, and both Trescothick and Kieswetter were praised for their batting form. They were the only side in the competition to remain unbeaten in the group stages, finishing with seven victories and one no result. In the quarter-final, against Group C runners-up Sussex, Somerset won the toss and opted to bat at Taunton. They struggled initially, losing the early wickets of Trescothick, James Hildreth and Ben Phillips for just 39 runs. A fourth-wicket partnership of 167, dominated by powerful hitting from Kieswetter in which he scored a "superb century" according to ESPNcricinfo's Andrew McGlashan, helped Somerset to recover to make 285/8, but Sussex chased the total down in the final over to eliminate the home side.

During the group stages of their campaign, Somerset achieved a number of large victories. They won by eight wickets against Warwickshire and Middlesex, and by more than a hundred runs against Kent and Scotland. Their match against Middlesex at Lord's was marred by some controversy, after Somerset were allowed too many powerplay overs in the rain-affected fixture. Somerset were set a reduced target of 290 off 41 overs, of which 19 were allocated by the umpires as being powerplay overs, three more than there should have been. The England and Wales Cricket Board (ECB) rejected Middlesex's request to replay the match, stating that they were upholding "the precedent that umpire errors cannot form the basis to declare a match null and void".

The two matches played against Middlesex were in stark contrast; in the match played at the Recreation Ground, Bath, Somerset bowled the London side out for 65, the joint second-lowest total made against Somerset in a List A match, while the 341/7 which Middlesex made at Lord's was the fourth-highest total scored against Somerset in the format. Somerset themselves scored their second-highest List A total, amassing 403/3 against Scotland, a game in which Hildreth scored 151, his highest List A score, and Somerset's highest score by a batsman at number three in List A cricket.

Zander de Bruyn finished the competition with the highest batting average amongst batsmen who played five or more innings. Four Somerset batsmen scored over 300 runs in the tournament (Trescothick, 476; Kieswetter, 395; de Bruyn, 388; Hildreth, 313), more than any other county except eventual winners Hampshire. Amongst the bowlers, Alfonso Thomas finished as the tournament's joint leading wicket-taker, claiming 20 wickets to finish level with Chris Schofield and Dominic Cork. Peter Trego's 18 wickets were the next most in the competition.

=== Season standings ===
Key: Pld = Played, W = Wins, T = Ties, L = Losses, NR = No result, Pts = Points, NRR = Net run rate.

Friends Provident Trophy: Group B
Team	Pld	W	T	L	NR	Pts	NRR
Somerset Sabres*	8	7	0	0	1	15	+2.001
Middlesex Panthers*	8	4	0	4	0	8	+0.137
Warwickshire Bears^{†}	8	3	1	3	1	8	+0.468
Kent Spitfires^{†}	8	3	1	4	0	7	−0.409
Scottish Saltires^{†}	8	1	0	7	0	2	−1.783

Notes:
Teams marked * progressed to the next stage of the competition.
Teams marked † were eliminated from the competition.

=== Match logs and statistics ===
Match logs
No.	Stage	Date	Opponents	Venue	Result	Ref
1	Group B	19 April	Warwickshire	Edgbaston, Birmingham	Won by 8 wickets	
2	Group B	26 April	Kent	County Ground, Taunton	Won by 110 runs	
3	Group B	4 May	Middlesex	Recreation Ground, Bath	Won by 8 wickets	
4	Group B	11 May	Scotland	County Ground, Taunton	Won by 151 runs	
5	Group B	14 May	Warwickshire	County Ground, Taunton	No result: Rain stopped play after 22 overs	
6	Group B	16 May	Kent	St Lawrence Ground, Canterbury	Won by 45 runs	
7	Group B	17 May	Middlesex	Lord's, London	Won by 5 wickets: Duckworth–Lewis method used	
8	Group B	20 May	Scotland	The Grange, Edinburgh	Won by 37 runs	
9	Quarter-final	23 May	Sussex	County Ground, Taunton	Lost by 6 wickets	

Batting averages
Player	Matches	Innings	Runs	Average	Highest score	100s	50s
Zander de Bruyn	9	6	388	97.00	96	0	5
Craig Kieswetter	8	8	395	65.83	138*	2	0
Justin Langer	8	4	195	65.00	78*	0	2
Marcus Trescothick	9	9	476	59.50	144	1	4
Peter Trego	9	6	171	57.00	74*	0	2
James Hildreth	9	9	313	34.77	151	1	1
Arul Suppiah	9	5	101	33.66	48	0	0
Qualification: 100 runs. Source: ESPNcricinfo

Bowling averages
Player	Matches	Overs	Wickets	Average	Economy	BBI	4wi
Zander de Bruyn	9	43.0	9	21.11	4.41	3/24	0
Charl Willoughby	7	55.0	3	82.33	4.49	1/16	0
Ben Phillips	8	54.1	6	43.16	4.78	3/23	0
Alfonso Thomas	9	67.0	20	18.05	5.38	4/22	1
Peter Trego	9	69.2	18	20.77	5.39	4/17	3
Omari Banks	8	38.0	5	42.00	5.52	3/40	0
Qualification: 25 overs. Source: ESPNcricinfo

== Twenty20 Cup ==
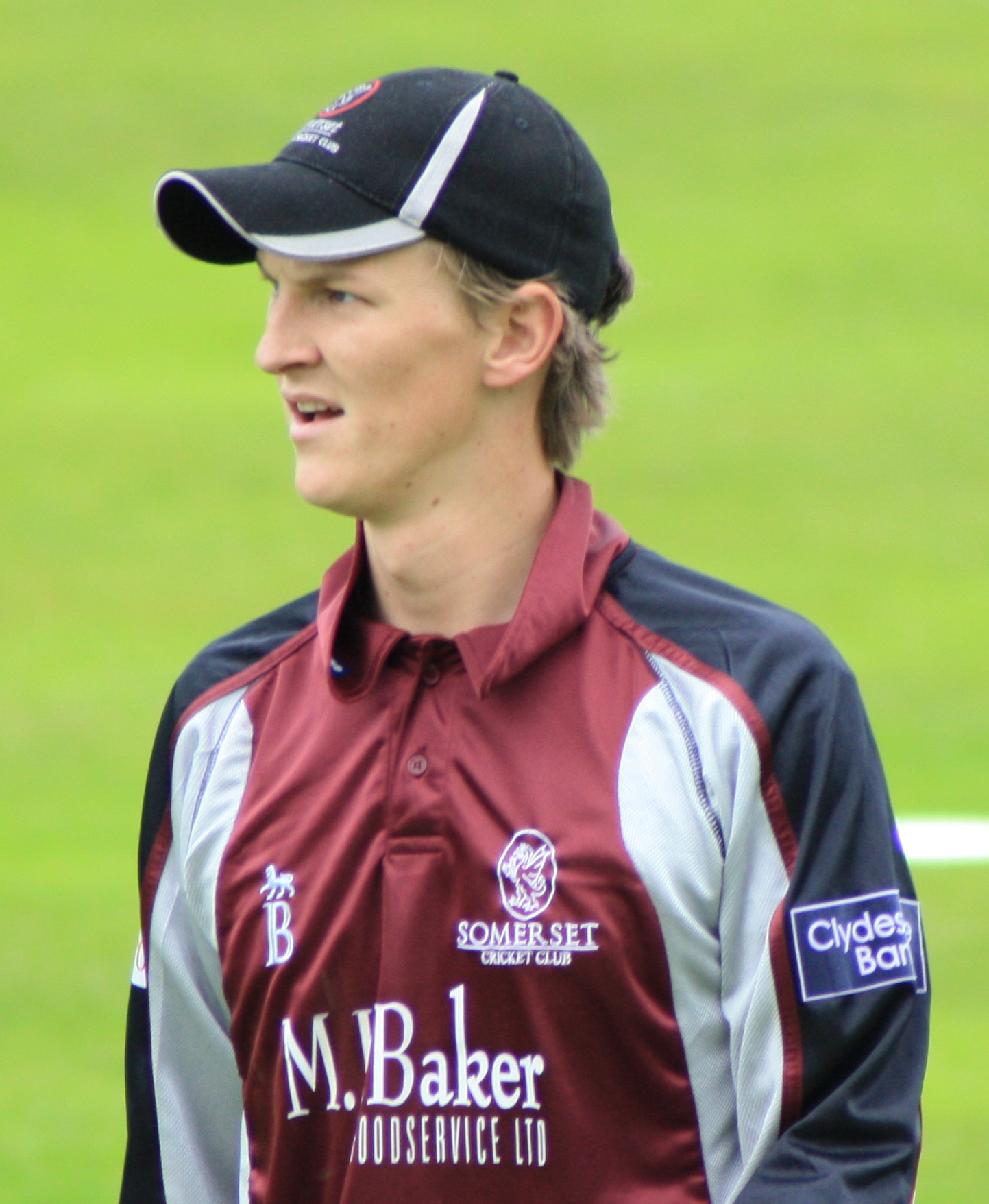
After making his debut early in 2009, young leg spinner Max Waller played in 10 of Somerset's 12 Twenty20 Cup matches.

Somerset finished as runners-up to Sussex in the 2009 Twenty20 Cup, having reached Finals Day in what captain Justin Langer described as "bizarre" fashion. Somerset qualified for the knock-out stages of the competition as the best third-placed team during the group stage, then beat Lancashire in a bowl-out to qualify for the semi-finals. After overcoming Kent in the semi-final, Somerset were comprehensively beaten by Sussex in the final.

After the Indian Premier League's second season demonstrated the importance of spin bowling in Twenty20 cricket, and due to Somerset's lack of a front-line spin bowler, Somerset picked young leg spinner Max Waller to make his Twenty20 debut in their opening match of the campaign. He claimed three wickets in two overs to help Somerset win by one run, and finished the competition as Somerset's joint second-highest wicket-taker with 10 wickets. Despite a number of good performances by Somerset's bowlers, a batsman was named man of the match in each of the team's victories: James Hildreth, Craig Kieswetter and Marcus Trescothick were all awarded the accolade once, while Zander de Bruyn picked up the award on three occasions. Somerset completed the group stage with six wins, three losses and one no result, placing them third in the Midlands/Wales/West Division. They qualified for the knockout-stage as they were the best third-placed team in the three groups.

Somerset's quarter-final, against Lancashire, was scheduled for Tuesday 28 July 2009. Bad weather meant that no play was possible on either the Tuesday or Wednesday, as a result of which the teams requested special dispensation from the ECB for an additional reserve day on the Thursday, which was granted. The wet weather continued, forcing the teams to play a bowl-out. Each team had to select five bowlers, each of whom had two deliveries at a set of unguarded stumps. Somerset won the bowl-out 5–1, with Ben Phillips, Peter Trego and Willoughby each hitting the stumps once, and Thomas hitting them twice.

In the second semi-final of 2009 Finals Day, Somerset won the toss and elected to field against Kent. Economical bowling from Thomas and Willoughby, as well as the early wickets of Joe Denly and Martin van Jaarsveld, helped to limit Kent to 145/5. On a slow pitch, Trescothick played what ESPNcricinfo's Andrew McGlashan described as a "brutal innings", scoring 56 runs off 32 balls. He shared an opening partnership of 73 with captain Langer, and by the time of Trescothick's dismissal after 8.1 overs, Somerset required 62 runs off 71 balls. Hildreth and de Bruyn took 10 overs to add another 57 runs, and after Hildreth was bowled for 36, Kieswetter added two runs to grant Somerset victory with seven balls remaining. Against Sussex in the final, Somerset once again won the toss and elected to field. A strong batting display by Sussex, highlighted by Dwayne Smith's 59 runs off 26 balls, set Somerset a target of 173 to win. In the opening overs of Somerset's reply, Trescothick scored powerfully, making the chase "look simple" according to McGlashan. However, after he was caught on 33, Somerset lost regular wickets. A partnership of 41 between de Bruyn and Trego steadied Somerset for a time, but when the pair were dismissed in subsequent overs, their team collapsed from 104/4 to 109 all out.

At the start of the competition, Somerset played with aggressive batting tactics, opening the innings with Kieswetter and Trescothick for the first six matches. This opening pair only passed 20 runs together on one occasion, against Glamorgan, (Note: For individual match scorecards see) and for the rest of the tournament, Kieswetter dropped down the batting order and Langer joined Trescothick at the top of the innings, in a move that Kieswetter said "adds a bit of balance to the side by putting a bit more firepower down the end and experience up top". The more experienced pair passed 40 runs together on four out of five occasions. (Note: For individual match scorecards see) The county's bowling relied heavily on medium pace, a fact which cricket writer Scyld Berry suggested was exposed in the final.

=== Season standings ===
Key: Pld = Played, W = Wins, L = Losses, T = Ties, NR = No result, Pts = Points, NRR = Net run rate.

Midlands/Wales/West Division
Team	Pld	W	L	T	NR	Pts	NRR
Northamptonshire Steelbacks*	10	7	2	0	1	15	+0.583
Warwickshire Bears*	10	7	3	0	0	14	+0.236
Somerset Sabres*	10	6	3	0	1	13	+0.417
Worcestershire Royals^{†}	10	5	5	0	0	10	+0.581
Gloucestershire Gladiators^{†}	10	2	8	0	0	4	−0.663
Glamorgan Dragons^{†}	10	2	8	0	0	4	−1.031

Notes:
Teams marked * progressed to the next stage of the competition.
Teams marked † were eliminated from the competition.

=== Match logs and statistics ===
Match logs
No.	Stage	Date	Opponents	Venue	Result	Ref
1	Midlands/Wales/West Division	25 May	Glamorgan	SWALEC Stadium, Cardiff	Won by 1 run	
2	Midlands/Wales/West Division	27 May	Warwickshire	County Ground, Taunton	Won by 5 wickets	
3	Midlands/Wales/West Division	29 May	Gloucestershire	County Ground, Taunton	Lost by 21 runs	
4	Midlands/Wales/West Division	1 June	Glamorgan	County Ground, Taunton	Won by 10 wickets	
5	Midlands/Wales/West Division	3 June	Worcestershire	New Road, Worcester	Lost by 8 runs	
6	Midlands/Wales/West Division	4 June	Northamptonshire	County Ground, Northampton	Won by 30 runs	
7	Midlands/Wales/West Division	23 June	Worcestershire	County Ground, Taunton	Won by 7 wickets	
8	Midlands/Wales/West Division	25 June	Northamptonshire	County Ground, Taunton	No result: Rain stopped play after 5 overs of the first innings	
9	Midlands/Wales/West Division	26 June	Gloucestershire	County Ground, Bristol	Won by 3 wickets	
10	Midlands/Wales/West Division	28 June	Warwickshire	Edgbaston, Birmingham	Lost by 1 run	
11	Quarter-final	28–30 July	Lancashire	Old Trafford, Manchester	Won on bowl-out (5–1)	
12	Semi-final	15 August	Kent	Edgbaston, Birmingham	Won by 7 wickets	
13	Final	15 August	Sussex	Edgbaston, Birmingham	Lost by 63 runs	

Batting averages
Player	Matches	Innings	Runs	Average	Strike rate	Highest score	50s
Zander de Bruyn	12	10	391	55.85	112.68	83*	3
Peter Trego	12	8	241	48.20	154.48	58*	1
Marcus Trescothick	12	11	323	32.30	159.90	69*	3
Craig Kieswetter	12	11	248	31.00	140.11	84	2
Justin Langer	12	9	179	22.37	120.13	44	0
James Hildreth	12	10	183	20.33	120.39	48*	0
Qualification: 100 runs. Source: ESPNcricinfo

Bowling averages
Player	Matches	Overs	Wickets	Average	Economy	BBI	4wi
Charl Willoughby	11	42.0	10	30.30	7.21	4/29	1
Arul Suppiah	11	17.1	7	17.71	7.22	3/25	0
Alfonso Thomas	12	40.2	18	17.22	7.68	3/31	0
Max Waller	10	27.0	10	20.80	7.70	3/17	0
Peter Trego	12	36.0	6	46.66	7.77	2/18	0
Mark Turner	5	15.0	6	21.33	8.53	2/20	0
Ben Phillips	8	30.0	6	43.33	8.66	2/19	0
Zander de Bruyn	12	10.0	4	22.75	9.10	2/2	0
Qualification: 10 overs. Source: ESPNcricinfo

== NatWest Pro40 ==
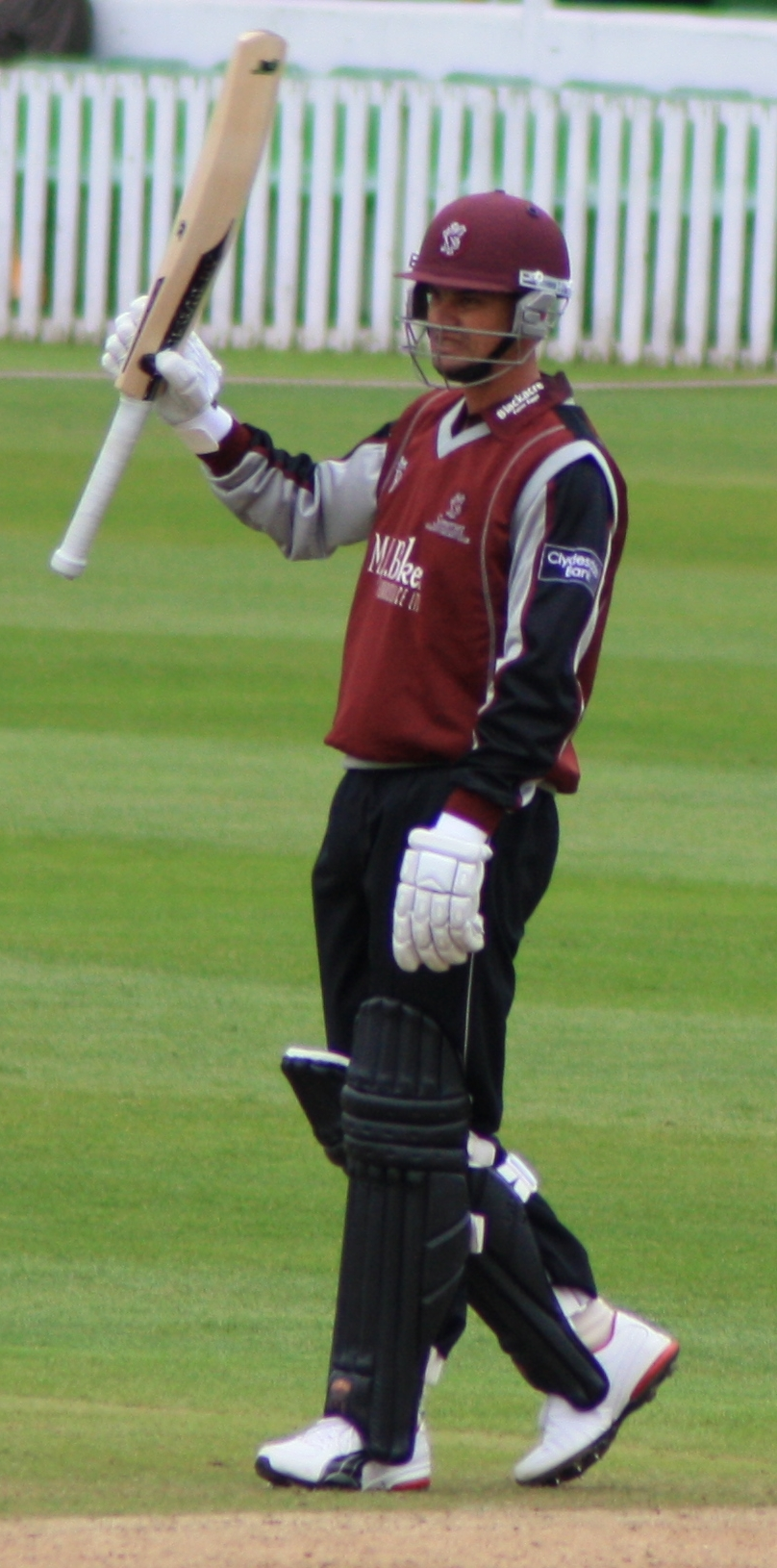
Zander de Bruyn was Somerset's leading run-scorer in the NatWest Pro40, scoring 324 runs at an average of 64.80.

Somerset's first match of the 2009 NatWest Pro40, against Nottinghamshire, ended just one over short of the requirement for a match. Chasing 248 to win, Somerset were significantly behind the required rate when rain halted play in the ninth over. The side responded positively to this stroke of luck, winning their next three matches by significant margins, before losing to Essex. Having been put in to bat at Taunton, each of Somerset's top six batsman reached double figures, but none of them managed to pass 50 and the home side were eventually all out for 205. Despite taking early wickets during Essex's innings – at one stage having the visitors 12/3 – the batting of John Maunders, James Foster and Tim Phillips propelled Essex past Somerset's total with five balls remaining. Two further victories ensured that Somerset entered their final match of the season with a chance to win the title.

Somerset had performed well but missed out narrowly in both the other one-day competitions in 2009, and could have clinched the competition with victory in their final match. News filtered through to the County Ground during their final match, against Durham, that leaders Sussex had lost to Worcestershire, meaning that a win against the north-eastern team would guarantee Somerset the title. The result rarely looked likely; a rapid opening to the chase by Durham openers Phil Mustard and Ian Blackwell provided a platform for their team to claim victory, and deny Somerset the title. Three of Somerset's bowlers claimed ten or more wickets in the competition (Ben Phillips, 14; Alfonso Thomas, 13; Charl Willoughby, 11), more than any other county in Division One.

=== Season standings ===
Key: Pld = Played, W = Wins, T = Ties, L = Losses, NR = No result, Pts = Points, NRR = Net run rate.

Division One
Team	Pld	W	T	L	NR	Pts	NRR
Sussex Sharks (C)	8	6	0	2	0	12	+1.253
Somerset Sabres	8	5	0	2	1	11	+1.137
Worcestershire Royals	8	5	0	2	1	11	−0.331
Essex Eagles	8	5	0	3	0	10	+0.332
Hampshire Hawks	8	4	0	4	0	8	+0.234
Durham Dynamos	8	4	0	4	0	8	−0.354
Yorkshire Carnegie	8	2	0	5	1	5	−0.184
Gloucestershire Gladiators	8	2	0	5	1	5	−0.358
Nottinghamshire Outlaws	8	0	0	6	2	2	−2.411

Notes:
Team marked (C) won the NatWest Pro40.

=== Match logs and statistics ===
Match logs
No.	Date	Opponents	Venue	Result	Ref
1	19 July	Nottinghamshire	Trent Bridge, Nottingham	No result: Rain stopped play after 9 overs of the second innings	
2	9 August	Yorkshire	County Ground, Taunton	Won by 5 wickets	
3	13 August	Gloucestershire	County Ground, Bristol	Won by 8 wickets	
4	17 August	Sussex	County Ground, Taunton	Won by 49 runs	
5	8 September	Essex	County Ground, Taunton	Lost by 2 wickets	
6	13 September	Hampshire	The Rose Bowl, Southampton	Won by 6 wickets	
7	14 September	Worcestershire	New Road, Worcester	Won by 84 runs	
8	27 September	Durham	County Ground, Taunton	Lost by 2 wickets	

Batting averages
Player	Matches	Innings	Runs	Average	Highest score	100s	50s
Arul Suppiah	8	6	133	133.00	52*	0	1
Zander de Bruyn	8	8	324	64.80	109*	1	2
Marcus Trescothick	8	8	318	45.42	80*	0	1
Craig Kieswetter	8	8	239	34.14	81	0	1
James Hildreth	8	8	213	30.42	62*	0	1
Peter Trego	8	6	101	20.20	28	0	0
Qualification: 100 runs. Source: ESPNcricinfo

Bowling averages
Player	Matches	Overs	Wickets	Average	Economy	BBI	4wi
Ben Phillips	8	47.0	14	14.00	4.17	3/24	0
Charl Willoughby	6	42.4	11	19.18	4.94	3/36	0
Zander de Bruyn	8	32.4	6	28.33	5.20	4/20	1
Alfonso Thomas	6	37.1	13	14.92	5.21	4/18	1
Max Waller	5	28.0	6	24.50	5.25	2/34	0
Peter Trego	8	49.0	4	64.50	5.26	2/29	0
Mark Turner	5	23.0	7	20.71	6.30	3/27	0
Qualification: 20 overs. Source: ESPNcricinfo

== Champions League Twenty20 ==
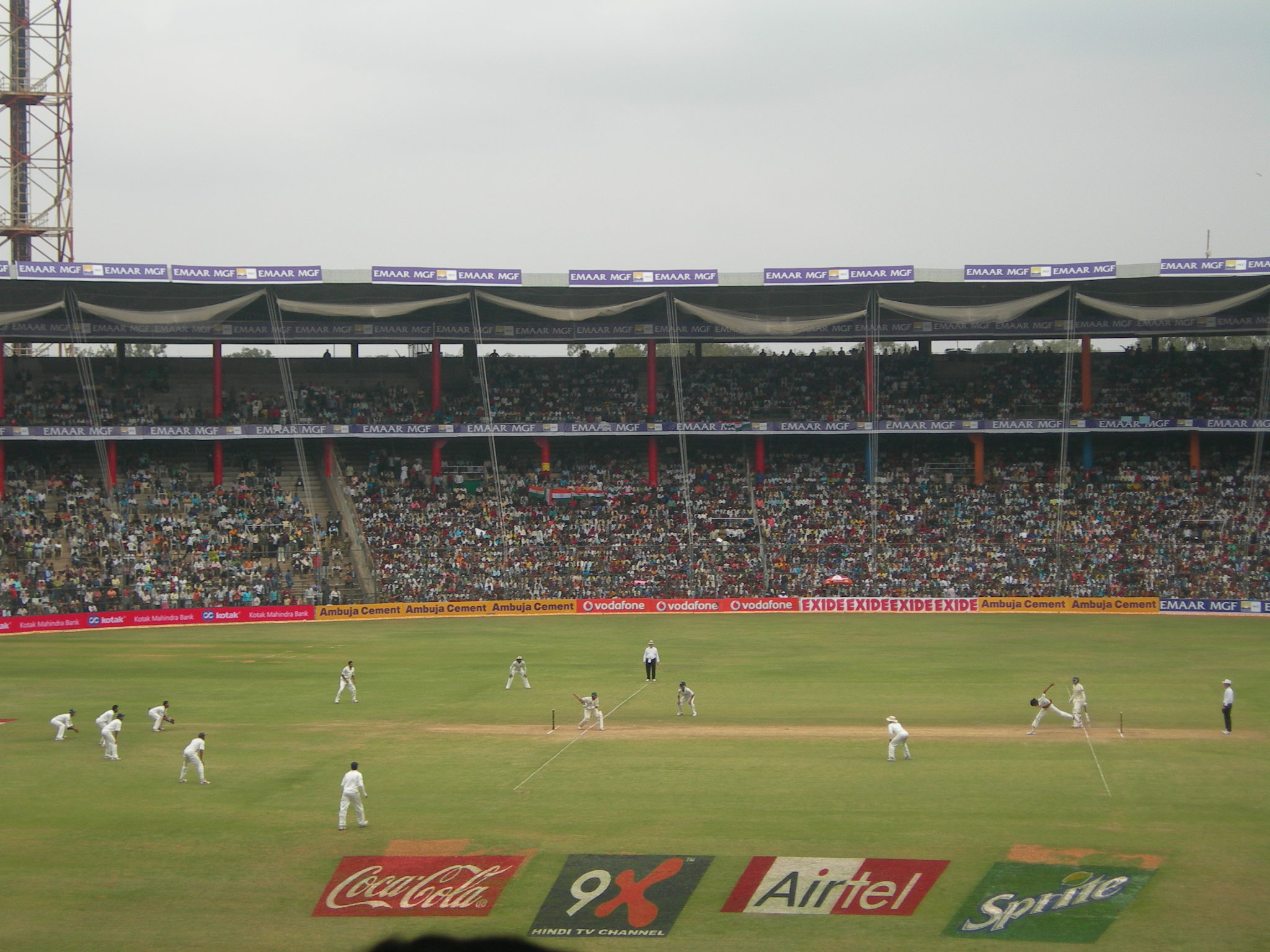
Somerset played one match at the 55,000 capacity M. Chinnaswamy Stadium.

By finishing as runners-up in the Twenty20 Cup, Somerset qualified to compete in the 2009 Champions League Twenty20, the first global club cricket tournament. Media attention surrounded Trescothick, who had returned home early from his last overseas tour in 2006–07 with a "stress-related illness". Brian Rose stressed that there was no pressure on Trescothick to take part in the tournament, and that the county would do everything possible to support him. The former England batsman did take part in the tournament, arriving three days after the rest of the squad. He played in both of Somerset's matches in the group stage of the competition, though he only managed to score 17 runs between his two innings.

Somerset won their first match, in which Alfonso Thomas scored two boundaries off the last three balls of the match to secure victory. Their opponents, Deccan Chargers scored 153 off their 20 overs, and with three wickets remaining, Somerset required 55 runs off 37 balls to win. A record eighth-wicket partnership between James Hildreth and Thomas of 50 brought the victory within reach, and Thomas' highest-score in Twenty20 cricket granted Somerset the win. Somerset lost their second match, being bowled out for their second-lowest Twenty20 total, 106 by Trinidad and Tobago.

Somerset progressed to the second round of the competition after Trinidad and Tobago beat Deccan in the final group match, but lost Trescothick, who flew home after a recurrence of his illness. Wes Durston, who replaced Trescothick in the side, top-scored for Somerset in their next match, making 57. Only two other players reached double-figures for the county, and the Diamond Eagles chased down the total with eight balls to spare. Somerset went into their final match, against the New South Wales Blues with a slim mathematical chance of progressing, but a strong bowling display from Brett Lee and Stuart Clark restricted Somerset to 111, which the Australian side reached with ease.

=== Season standings ===
Key: Pld = Played, W = Wins, L = Losses, T = Ties, NR = No result, Pts = Points, NRR = Net run rate.

Group A
Team	Pld	W	L	T	NR	Pts	NRR
Trinidad and Tobago*	2	2	0	0	0	4	1.175
(England) Somerset Sabres*	2	1	1	0	0	2	−1.000
(India) Deccan Chargers^{†}	2	0	2	0	0	0	−0.175

Notes:
Teams marked * progressed to the next stage of the competition.
Teams marked † were eliminated from the competition.

League A
Team	Pld	W	L	T	NR	Pts	NRR
Trinidad and Tobago*	3	3	0	0	0	6	1.378
(Australia) New South Wales Blues*	3	2	1	0	0	4	1.843
(South Africa) Diamond Eagles^{†}	3	1	2	0	0	2	−1.110
(England) Somerset Sabres^{†}	3	0	3	0	0	0	−2.005

Notes:
Teams marked * progressed to the next stage of the competition.
Teams marked † were eliminated from the competition.

=== Match logs and statistics ===
Match logs
No.	Stage	Date	Opponents	Venue	Result	Ref
1	Group A	10 October	Deccan Chargers	Rajiv Gandhi International Cricket Stadium, Hyderabad	Won by 1 wicket	
2	Group A	12 October	Trinidad & Tobago	M. Chinnaswamy Stadium, Bangalore	Lost by 44 runs	
3	League A	16 October	Diamond Eagles	Rajiv Gandhi International Cricket Stadium, Hyderabad	Lost by 5 wickets	
4	League A	18 October	New South Wales Blues	Rajiv Gandhi International Cricket Stadium, Hyderabad	Lost by 6 wickets	

Batting averages
Player	Matches	Innings	Runs	Average	Strike rate	Highest score	50s
Wes Durston	2	2	77	77.00	171.11	57	1
Alfonso Thomas	4	3	40	40.00	166.66	30*	0
Zander de Bruyn	4	4	87	29.00	92.55	43*	0
James Hildreth	4	4	62	15.50	86.11	31	0
Justin Langer	4	4	47	11.75	83.92	15	0
Qualification: 40 runs. Source: ESPNcricinfo

Bowling averages
Player	Matches	Overs	Wickets	Average	Economy	BBI	4wi
Alfonso Thomas	4	15.3	6	15.00	5.80	2/20	0
Max Waller	3	8.0	3	18.33	6.87	2/27	0
Peter Trego	4	8.0	2	30.00	7.50	2/19	0
Ben Phillips	3	12.0	4	24.00	8.00	3/31	0
Zander de Bruyn	4	6.0	3	17.66	8.83	2/19	0
Charl Willoughby	4	15.0	6	23.00	9.20	3/35	0
Qualification: 5 overs. Source: ESPNcricinfo

== Reaction ==
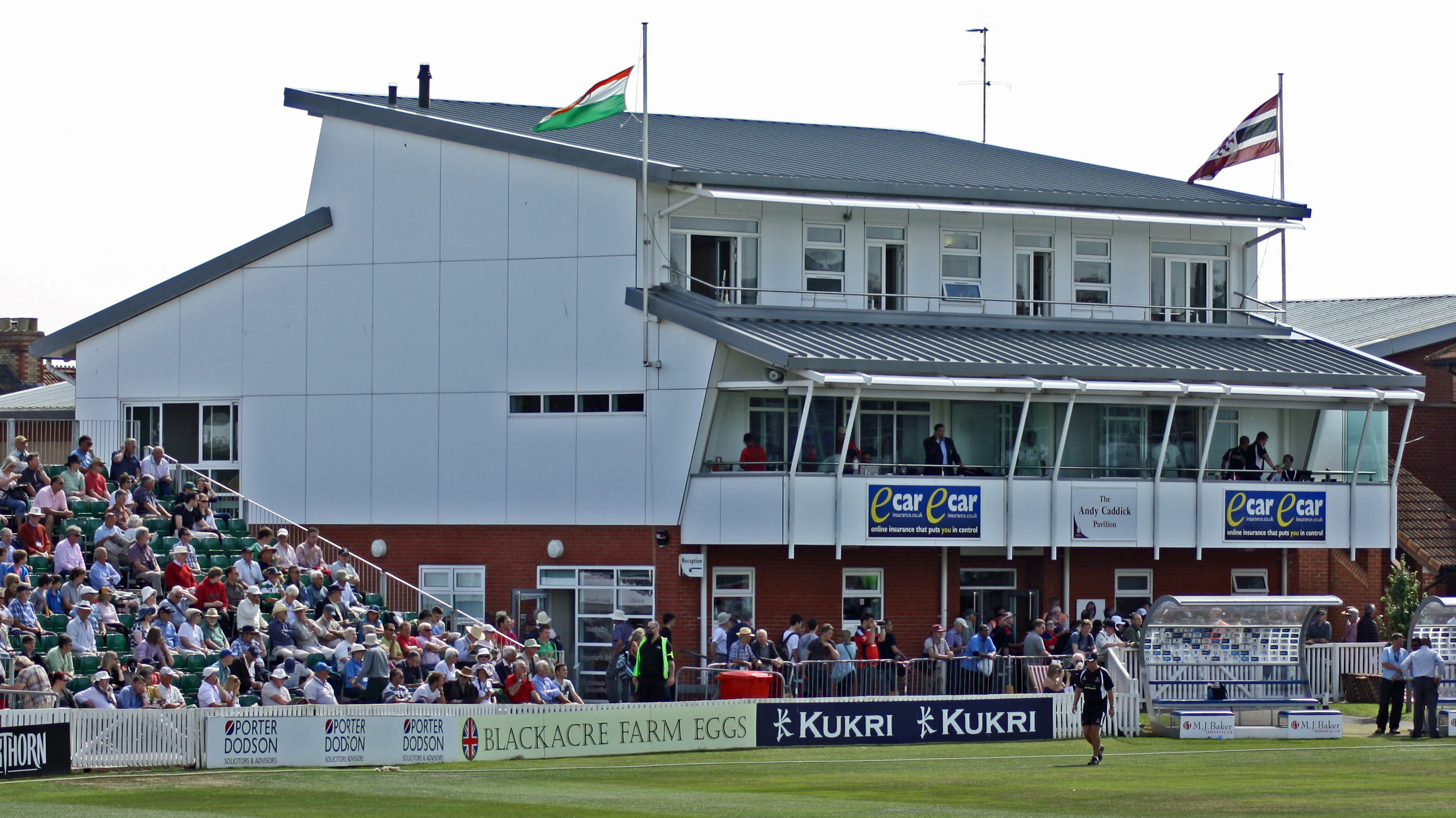
The Andy Caddick Pavilion was completed in May 2009

After the conclusion of the Champions League tournament, Justin Langer retired from professional cricket. Trescothick replaced him as Somerset captain for the 2010 season. Somerset also lost Andy Caddick to retirement. Wicket-keeper Carl Gazzard also announced his retirement at the end of the season aged 27, having lost his place in the Somerset side to Craig Kieswetter. Additionally, Somerset released Wes Durston and Omari Banks, both of whom they felt were surplus to requirements. Somerset addressed the weakness of their spin bowling by signing Murali Kartik as their overseas player for 2010.

Kieswetter's performances in the 2009 season led to his inclusion in the England Performance Programme squad in November and December of that year, and he was part of the England Lions squad which toured the United Arab Emirates in early 2010, along with Somerset team-mate Peter Trego. His full England debut came shortly after in Bangladesh. Additionally, two of Somerset's young players, Jos Buttler and Calum Haggett played for England Under-19s during the English winter.

Financially, Somerset broke even in 2009, generating a gross turnover of £4.5 million. The club achieved this despite carrying out significant building work on the County Ground during the period: the "Somerset Stand", a 3,000-seat grandstand opened in April, while the "Andy Caddick Pavilion" was completed just over a month later, providing new dressing rooms and club offices. Andy Nash, the Somerset chairman, highlighted the catering department and match-day income as being particularly successful in 2009, with both areas exceeding £1 million in revenue during the year.
