= Somerset County Cricket Club in 2010 =

2010 season of an English cricket team

Somerset County Cricket Club
2010 season
- Coach: Andy Hurry
- Captain: Marcus Trescothick
- Overseas player: Murali Kartik; Damien Wright; Kieron Pollard (T20)
- County Championship: Division One, 2nd
- Clydesdale Bank 40: Runners-up
- Friends Provident t20: Runners-up
- Most runs: James Hildreth (1,440)
- Most wickets: Charl Willoughby (58)
- Most catches: Marcus Trescothick (26)
- Most wicket-keeping dismissals: Craig Kieswetter (29)

The 2010 season saw Somerset County Cricket Club competing in three domestic competitions; the first division of the County Championship, the Clydesdale Bank 40 and the Friends Provident t20. They finished as runners-up in both the County Championship and the Friends Provident t20, and reached the final in the Clydesdale Bank 40 competition.

They were captained for the first season by former England international, Marcus Trescothick.

== Background ==
The 2009 season saw Somerset play consistently well, but they fell short of winning in all four domestic competitions; prompting Director of Cricket Brian Rose to say "We've had enough of being cricket's nearly men."

Justin Langer, captain of the side from 2007 to 2009 retired from all forms of cricket at the end of the 2009 season, as did fast bowler Andy Caddick. Somerset signed Murali Kartik as their overseas player for 2010, although he would miss the first four weeks of the season they also added Damien Wright to play during this period. In the Friends Provident t20, county sides are allowed to play two overseas players, and signed Kieron Pollard and Cameron White to fulfil these roles. Nick Compton was signed from Middlesex as a batting replacement for Langer.

== Squad ==
The following players made at least one appearance for Somerset in first-class, List A or Twenty20 cricket in 2010. Age given is at the start of Somerset's first match of the season (15 April 2010).

Somerset players in 2010
Name	Nationality	Age	Batting stance	Bowling style	Ref
Jos Buttler (WK)	England	19	Right-handed	—	
Nick Compton	England	26	Right-handed	Right arm off break	
Zander de Bruyn	South Africa	34	Right-handed	Right arm fast-medium	
Lewis Gregory	England	17	Right-handed	Right arm fast-medium	
James Hildreth	England	25	Right-handed	Right arm medium-fast	
Chris Jones	England	19	Right-handed	—	
Murali Kartik	India	33	Left-handed	Slow left-arm orthodox	
Craig Kieswetter (WK)	England	22	Right-handed	—	
Michael Munday	England	25	Right-handed	Right arm leg break	
Ben Phillips	England	35	Right-handed	Right arm fast-medium	
Kieron Pollard	West Indies	22	Right-handed	Right arm medium pace	
David Stiff	England	25	Right-handed	Right arm fast	
Arul Suppiah	Malaysia	26	Right-handed	Slow left-arm orthodox	
Alfonso Thomas	South Africa	33	Right-handed	Right arm fast-medium	
Peter Trego	England	28	Right-handed	Right arm medium pace	
Marcus Trescothick (captain)	England	34	Left-handed	Right arm medium pace	
Mark Turner	England	25	Right-handed	Right arm medium-fast	
Max Waller	England	22	Right-handed	Right arm leg break	
Charl Willoughby	South Africa	35	Left-handed	Left arm fast-medium	
Damien Wright	Australia	34	Right-handed	Right arm fast-medium	

== County Championship ==
=== Season standings ===
Note: Pld = Played, W = Wins, L = Losses, D = Draws, T = Ties, A = Abandonments, Bat = Batting points, Bwl = Bowling points, Adj = Adjustments/Penalties, Pts = Points.

County Championship: Division One
Team	Pld	W	L	D	T	A	Bat	Bwl	Adj	Pts
Nottinghamshire (C)	16	7	5	4	0	0	47	43	0	214
Somerset	16	6	2	8	0	0	53	41	0	214
Yorkshire	16	6	2	8	0	0	41	42	0	203
Lancashire	16	5	3	8	0	0	35	43	0	182
Durham	16	5	3	8	0	0	30	39	0	173
Warwickshire	16	6	9	1	0	0	20	47	0	166
Hampshire	16	3	6	7	0	0	47	41	0	157
Kent (R)	16	3	7	6	0	0	42	44	−1	151
Essex (R)	16	2	6	8	0	0	29	43	−2	126
Adjustments: Kent deducted 1 point for a slow over-rate in their match against Lancashire. Essex deducted 2 points for a slow over-rate in their match against Somerset. Source: CricketArchive

=== Match log ===
No.	Date	Opponents	Venue	Result	Ref
1	15–18 April	Yorkshire	Headingley, Leeds	Lost by 6 wickets	
2	21–23 April	Nottinghamshire	Trent Bridge, Nottingham	Lost by 2 wickets	
3	27–30 April	Essex	County Ground, Taunton	Drawn	
4	4–7 May	Lancashire	Old Trafford, Manchester	Drawn	
5	10–13 May	Hampshire	The Rose Bowl, Southampton	Drawn	
6	17–20 May	Yorkshire	County Ground, Taunton	Won by 6 wickets	
7	24–26 May	Warwickshire	County Ground, Taunton	Won by 9 wickets	
8	4–6 June	Warwickshire	Edgbaston, Birmingham	Won by 181 runs	
9	20–23 July	Kent	County Ground, Taunton	Drawn	
10	29–31 July	Nottinghamshire	County Ground, Taunton	Won by 10 wickets	
11	3–6 August	Kent	St Lawrence Ground, Canterbury	Drawn	
12	9–12 August	Hampshire	County Ground, Taunton	Drawn	
13	18 August	Essex	Castle Park Cricket Ground, Colchester	Won by 219 runs	
14	24 August	Durham	County Ground, Taunton	Drawn	
15	7 September	Lancashire	County Ground, Taunton	Won by 9 wickets	
16	13 September	Durham	Riverside, Chester-le-Street	Drawn	

=== Batting averages ===
Player	Matches	Innings	Runs	Average	Highest Score	100s	50s
James Hildreth	16	23	1,440	65.45	151	7	5
Marcus Trescothick	16	28	1,397	58.20	228*	4	6
Zander de Bruyn	14	21	814	38.76	95	0	5
Arul Suppiah	16	26	771	33.52	125	1	4
Jos Buttler	13	20	569	33.47	144	1	2
Nick Compton	11	17	465	33.21	72	0	2
Peter Trego	16	23	693	33.00	108	1	5
Craig Kieswetter	12	18	467	27.47	84	0	4
Qualification: 450 runs. Source: Cricinfo

=== Bowling averages ===
Player	Matches	Innings	Wickets	Average	BBI	BBM	5wi	10wm
Murali Kartik	11	20	45	19.60	6/42	11/72	5	2
Ben Phillips	11	19	29	22.79	5/72	5/72	1	0
Alfonso Thomas	15	26	49	24.53	5/40	7/117	2	0
Damien Wright	5	9	14	26.92	5/41	6/89	1	0
Charl Willoughby	16	29	58	27.27	6/101	7/97	1	0
Zander de Bruyn	14	17	12	32.16	4/23	4/23	0	0
Peter Trego	16	25	22	33.13	4/26	6/121	0	0
Qualification: 10 wickets. Source: Cricinfo

== Clydesdale Bank 40 ==
=== Season standings ===
Clydesdale Bank 40: Group A
Team	Pld	W	L	T	N/R	Adj	Pts	Net R/R
Somerset*	12	10	2	0	0	0	20	+1.491
Sussex Sharks^{†}	12	7	3	1	1	0	16	+0.903
Surrey Lions^{†}	12	6	4	1	1	0	14	−0.006
Lancashire Lightning^{†}	12	6	6	0	0	0	12	−0.315
Worcestershire Royals^{†}	12	4	8	0	0	0	8	−0.196
Unicorns^{†}	12	3	7	0	2	0	8	−0.470
Glamorgan Dragons^{†}	12	2	8	0	2	−1	5	−1.585
Teams marked * progressed to the next stage of the competition. Team marked † were eliminated from the competition. Source: CricketArchive

=== Match logs ===
No.	Stage	Date	Opponents	Venue	Result	Ref
1	Group A	25 April	Glamorgan	SWALEC Stadium, Cardiff	Won by 38 runs: Duckworth–Lewis method used	
2	Group A	3 May	Lancashire	Old Trafford, Manchester	Won by 42 runs	
3	Group A	9 May	Unicorns	County Ground, Taunton	Won by 7 wickets	
4	Group A	15 May	Sussex	County Ground, Taunton	Won by 4 wickets	
5	Group A	23 May	Worcestershire	Recreation Ground, Bath	Won by 71 runs	
6	Group A	25 July	Surrey	The Oval, London	Won by 94 runs	
7	Group A	8 August	Unicorns	The Maer Ground, Exmouth	Won by 3 wickets	
8	Group A	16 August	Lancashire	County Ground, Taunton	Won by 115 runs	
9	Group A	22 August	Sussex	Cricket Field Road Ground, Horsham	Lost by 17 runs: Duckworth–Lewis method used	
10	Group A	29 August	Surrey	County Ground, Taunton	Won by 64 runs: Duckworth–Lewis method used	
11	Group A	30 August	Worcestershire	New Road, Worcester	Lost by 49 runs	
12	Group A	4 September	Glamorgan	County Ground, Taunton	Won by 249 runs	
13	Semi-final	11 September	Essex	County Ground, Taunton	Won by 95 runs	
14	Final	18 September	Warwickshire	Lord's, London	Lost by 3 wickets	

=== Batting averages ===
Player	Matches	Innings	Runs	Average	Highest Score	100s	50s
James Hildreth	14	14	627	69.66	100*	1	5
Jos Buttler	14	13	440	55.00	90*	0	4
Craig Kieswetter	9	9	391	43.44	107	1	2
Peter Trego	14	12	396	39.60	147	1	1
Zander de Bruyn	12	12	433	39.36	106*	1	3
Nick Compton	14	14	382	27.28	73	0	5
Marcus Trescothick	14	14	366	26.14	79	0	4
Qualification: 300 runs. Source: Cricket Archive

=== Bowling averages ===
Player	Matches	Overs	Wickets	Average	Economy	BBI	4wi
Murali Kartik	10	69.3	20	16.05	4.61	4/30	1
Alfonso Thomas	14	81.1	27	15.92	5.29	4/34	2
Max Waller	8	39.0	4	51.75	5.30	2/24	0
Ben Phillips	13	83.5	19	24.52	5.55	4/31	1
Peter Trego	14	75.3	13	33.00	5.68	2/29	0
Zander de Bruyn	12	47.2	15	19.40	6.14	3/27	0
Mark Turner	6	31.5	9	26.00	7.35	4/36	1
Qualification: 30 overs. Source: Cricket Archive

== Friends Provident t20 ==
=== Season standings ===
Note: Pld = Played, W = Wins, L = Losses, T = Ties, NR = No result, Pts = Points, NRR = Net run rate.

South Division
Team	Pld	W	L	T	NR	Pts	NRR
Somerset*	16	11	5	0	0	22	+0.418
Essex Eagles*	16	10	6	0	0	20	+0.395
Sussex Sharks*	16	9	7	0	0	18	+0.606
Hampshire Royals*	16	8	8	0	0	16	+0.385
Surrey Lions^{†}	16	8	8	0	0	16	+0.183
Middlesex Panthers^{†}	16	8	8	0	0	16	+0.018
Kent Spitfires^{†}	16	7	9	0	0	14	−0.163
Glamorgan Dragons^{†}	16	6	10	0	0	12	−0.979
Gloucestershire Gladiators^{†}	16	5	11	0	0	10	−0.943
Teams marked * progressed to the next stage of the competition. Team marked † were eliminated from the competition.

=== Match logs ===
No.	Stage	Date	Opponents	Venue	Result	Ref
1	South Division	1 June	Sussex	County Ground, Hove	Won by 52 runs	
2	South Division	9 June	Middlesex	Lord's, London	Won by 5 wickets	
3	South Division	11 June	Hampshire	The Rose Bowl, Southampton	Won by 7 runs	
4	South Division	12 June	Surrey	County Ground, Taunton	Lost by 21 runs	
5	South Division	16 June	Essex	County Ground, Taunton	Lost by 10 runs	
6	South Division	18 June	Gloucestershire	County Ground, Taunton	Won by 6 wickets	
7	South Division	20 June	Kent	County Cricket Ground, Beckenham	Won by 84 runs	
8	South Division	25 June	Sussex	County Ground, Taunton	Won by 7 wickets	
9	South Division	28 June	Glamorgan	County Ground, Taunton	Won by 6 wickets	
10	South Division	2 July	Surrey	The Oval, London	Lost by 39 runs	
11	South Division	4 July	Middlesex	County Ground, Taunton	Won by 79 runs	
12	South Division	9 July	Hampshire	County Ground, Taunton	Won by 6 wickets	
13	South Division	11 July	Essex	County Ground, Chelmsford	Won by 6 wickets	
14	South Division	14 July	Glamorgan	SWALEC Stadium, Cardiff	Won by 6 wickets: Duckworth–Lewis method used.	
15	South Division	16 July	Gloucestershire	County Ground, Bristol	Won by 6 wickets	
16	South Division	18 June	Kent	County Ground, Taunton	Lost by 59 runs	
17	Quarter-final	27 July	Northamptonshire	County Ground, Taunton	Won by 7 wickets	
18	Semi-final	14 August	Nottinghamshire	The Rose Bowl, Southampton	Won by 3 runs: Duckworth–Lewis method used.	
19	Final	14 August	Hampshire	The Rose Bowl, Southampton	Lost by losing more wickets	

=== Batting averages ===
Player	Matches	Innings	Runs	Average	Strike rate	Highest Score	50s
James Hildreth	19	19	459	32.78	110.60	77*	2
Kieron Pollard	17	16	354	32.18	175.24	89*	2
Marcus Trescothick	19	19	572	31.77	157.14	83	6
Zander de Bruyn	19	18	303	30.30	124.18	95*	1
Jos Buttler	19	14	240	30.00	160.00	55*	1
Peter Trego	16	15	294	22.61	135.48	72*	1
Craig Kieswetter	10	10	220	22.00	102.32	71	1
Qualification: 200 runs. Source: Cricinfo

=== Bowling averages ===
Player	Matches	Overs	Wickets	Average	Economy	BBI	4wi
Alfonso Thomas	19	72.5	33	13.93	6.31	3/11	0
Murali Kartik	17	61.0	13	30.92	6.59	3/18	0
Kieron Pollard	17	58.2	29	15.10	7.50	4/15	1
Ben Phillips	18	60.0	19	24.52	7.76	3/33	0
Mark Turner	15	42.0	14	26.57	8.85	3/25	0
Zander de Bruyn	19	28.0	7	35.42	8.85	2/21	0
Peter Trego	16	31.0	11	25.18	8.93	2/19	0
Qualification: 20 overs. Source: Cricinfo

== Tourist match ==
=== Match log ===
No.	Date	Opponents	Venue	Result	Ref
1	2 September	Pakistan	County Ground, Taunton	Lost by 8 runs	
