= Indian cricket team in England in 2011 =

International cricket tour

	India	England
- Dates: 21 July – 16 September 2011
Captains	MS Dhoni	Andrew Strauss (Test); Alastair Cook (ODI); Stuart Broad (T20I)

Test series
- Result: England won the 4-match series 4–0
Most runs	Rahul Dravid (461)	Kevin Pietersen (533)
Most wickets	Praveen Kumar (15)	Stuart Broad (25)
- Player of the series: Stuart Broad (Eng); Rahul Dravid (Ind)

One Day International series
- Results: England won the 5-match series 3–0
Most runs	MS Dhoni (236)	Ravi Bopara (197)
Most wickets	Ravichandran Ashwin (6)	Graeme Swann (8)
- Player of the series: MS Dhoni (Ind)

Twenty20 International series
- Results: England won the 1-match series 1–0
Most runs	Ajinkya Rahane (61)	Eoin Morgan (49)
Most wickets	Munaf Patel (2)	Jade Dernbach (4)
- Player of the series: Jade Dernbach (Eng)

The Indian cricket team toured England from 21 July to 16 September 2011. The tour consisted of one Twenty20 International (T20I), five One Day Internationals (ODIs) and four Test matches, as well as a number of matches against English county sides. The opening Test at Lord's was the 2,000th Test. England's victory in the Third Test put them number one in the world rankings.

== Squads ==
Tests		ODIs		T20Is	
England	India	England	India	England	India
Andrew Strauss (c); Alastair Cook (vc); James Anderson; Ian Bell; Ravi Bopara; Tim Bresnan; Stuart Broad; Steven Finn; Eoin Morgan; Graham Onions; Kevin Pietersen; Matt Prior (wk); Graeme Swann; Chris Tremlett; Jonathan Trott	MS Dhoni (c & wk); Gautam Gambhir (vc); Rahul Dravid; Harbhajan Singh; Zaheer Khan; Virat Kohli^{†}; Praveen Kumar; VVS Laxman; Amit Mishra; Abhinav Mukund; Pragyan Ojha^{†}; Munaf Patel; Suresh Raina; Wriddhiman Saha (wk); Virender Sehwag; Ishant Sharma; RP Singh^{†}; Sreesanth; Sachin Tendulkar; Yuvraj Singh	Alastair Cook (c); Stuart Broad (vc); James Anderson; Ian Bell; Ravi Bopara; Tim Bresnan; Jade Dernbach; Steven Finn; Craig Kieswetter (wk); Eoin Morgan; Samit Patel; Ben Stokes; Graeme Swann; Jonathan Trott	MS Dhoni (c & wk); Suresh Raina (vc); Varun Aaron; Ravichandran Ashwin; Rahul Dravid; Ravindra Jadeja^{‡}; Virat Kohli; Praveen Kumar; Amit Mishra; Munaf Patel; Parthiv Patel (wk); Ajinkya Rahane; Rohit Sharma; RP Singh; Sachin Tendulkar; Vinay Kumar	Stuart Broad (c); Eoin Morgan (vc); Ravi Bopara; Tim Bresnan; Jos Buttler; Jade Dernbach; Steven Finn; Alex Hales; Craig Kieswetter (wk); Samit Patel; Kevin Pietersen; Ben Stokes; Graeme Swann	MS Dhoni (c & wk); Suresh Raina (vc); Varun Aaron; Ravichandran Ashwin; Rahul Dravid; Gautam Gambhir; Virat Kohli; Praveen Kumar; Amit Mishra; Munaf Patel; Parthiv Patel (wk); Ajinkya Rahane; Rohit Sharma; RP Singh; Sachin Tendulkar; Vinay Kumar

^{†} Virat Kohli, Pragyan Ojha and RP Singh replaced the injured Yuvraj Singh, Harbhajan Singh and Zaheer Khan, respectively, for the third and fourth Test matches.
^{‡} Ravindra Jadeja replaced the injured Gautam Gambhir for the ODI series.

== Tour matches ==
=== First-class: Somerset v Indians ===
15–17 July
Scorecard

Somerset	v	Indians
425/3d (96 overs); Arul Suppiah 156 (259); Suresh Raina 1/53 (9 overs)		224 (52.4 overs); Suresh Raina 103* (112); Charl Willoughby 6/76 (20 overs)
260/2d (41 overs); Andrew Strauss 109* (135); Amit Mishra 2/123 (14 overs)		69/0 (16.4 overs); Gautam Gambhir 36* (49)

Match drawn
County Ground, Taunton
Umpires: Nigel Llong (Eng) and Graham Lloyd (Eng)

- Somerset won the toss and elected to bat.

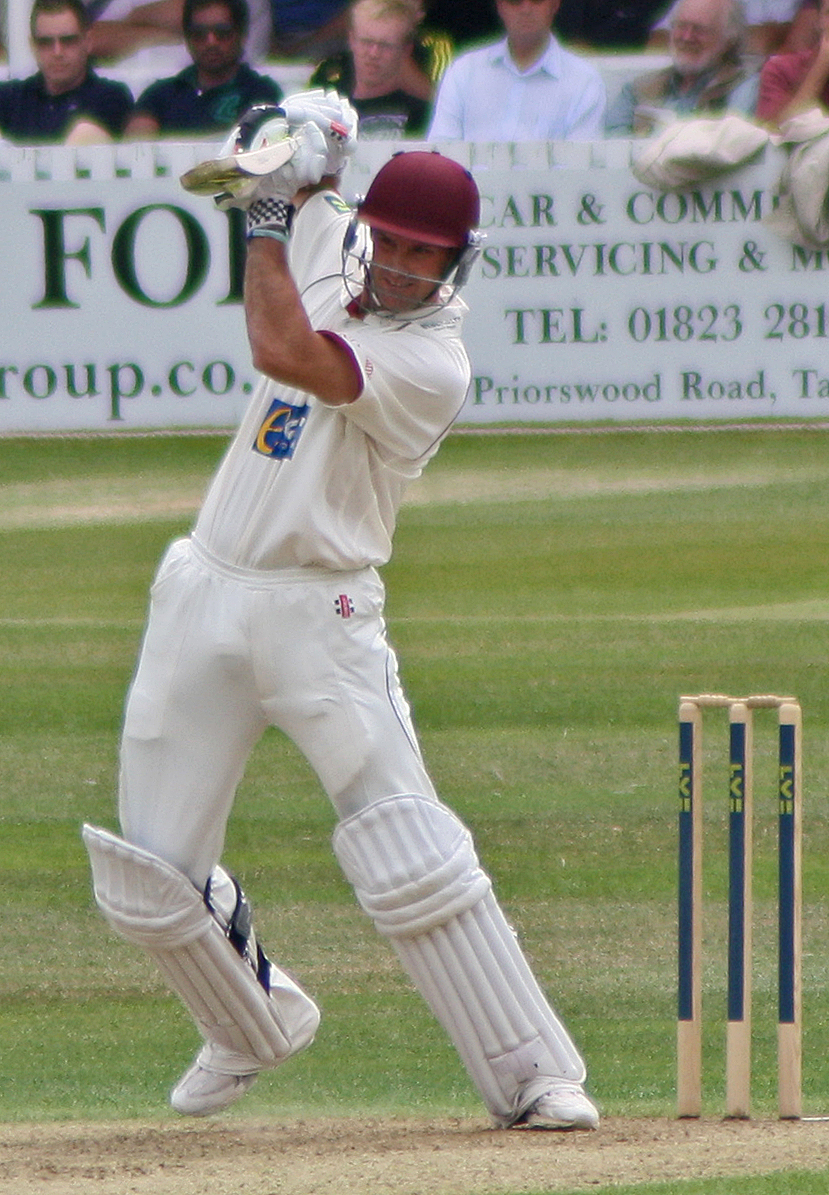
Strauss batting for Somerset.

India rested a number of their Test players for their first match of the tour; Mahendra Singh Dhoni, Ishant Sharma, Praveen Kumar and Harbhajan Singh were all left out of the team. The weakened bowling attack showed on the first day of the match, when Somerset scored 329 for the loss of two wickets from a rain-reduced 75 overs. Andrew Strauss, the England Test captain and Middlesex player, opened the innings as a guest batsman for Somerset, showed aggression initially, scoring 78 runs out of an opening partnership of 101, before getting out. Andrew McGlashan, summarising the day for Cricinfo, described his innings as "commanding", and his shots "in good working order". After Strauss' dismissal, his opening partner Arul Suppiah began to score more freely, and reached his century off 179 balls, scoring his second 50 from just 57 deliveries. Suppiah and Nick Compton put on a second wicket partnership of 223 before Compton was dismissed for 88. Suppiah reached 156, his highest first-class score before he was out, and Somerset eventually declared their innings closed at 425/3.

In reply, the Indians struggled with the bat during the second, rain affected day; Somerset's Charl Willoughby took five wickets against a batting line-up which showed its lack of match practice. On the third morning, Suresh Raina controlled the strike well to bat his way to a century and stake his claim for a place in first Test, dominating a final wicket partnership of 84. Somerset once more look assured with the bat during their second innings, in which Strauss reached a century, eventually finishing 109 not out, and Peter Trego scored a rapid 85 runs from 57 balls. Somerset declared at tea on the final day, leaving India only a short period to bat in the second innings. The match finished as a draw, but Somerset coach Andrew Hurry suggested that Somerset had "bullied" India, and that it had been "a perfect three days" for Strauss.

=== Two-day: Northamptonshire v Indians ===
5–6 August
Scorecard

Indians	v	Northamptonshire
352 (95.3 overs); Abhinav Mukund 113 (160); Luke Evans 4/74 (21.3 overs)		355/7 (83.2 overs); Niall O'Brien 117 (172); Amit Mishra 2/64 (25 overs)

Match drawn
County Ground, Northampton
Umpires: Martin Bodenham (Eng) and Martin Saggers (Eng)

- Indians won the toss and elected to bat.

=== List A: Sussex Sharks v Indians ===
25 August
Scorecard

Sussex Sharks; 236 (45 overs)	v	Indians; 238/4 (40.5 overs)
Matt Machan 56 (62); RP Singh 4/45 (9 overs)		Virat Kohli 71 (83); Chris Nash 1/18 (5 overs)

Indians won by 6 wickets
County Ground, Hove
Umpires: Mark Eggleston (Eng) & Richard Illingworth (Eng)

- Indians won the toss and elected to field.
- Rain reduced match to 45 overs per side.

=== List A: Kent Spitfires v Indians ===
26 August
Scorecard

Indians; 164/6 (20 overs)	v	Kent Spitfires; 159/5 (20 overs)
Virat Kohli 78 (53); James Tredwell 2/18 (3 overs)		Joe Denly 100 (68); RP Singh 2/36 (4 overs)

Indians won by 5 runs
St Lawrence Ground, Canterbury
Umpires: Jeremy Lloyds (Eng) and Billy Taylor (Eng)

- Kent won the toss and elected to field.
- Rain reduced match to 20 overs per side.

=== Twenty 20: Leicestershire Foxes v Indians ===
29 August
Scorecard

Indians; 161/5 (20 overs)	v	Leicestershire Foxes; 146/7 (20 overs)
Parthiv Patel 40 (31); Josh Cobb 2/22 (3 overs)		Andrew McDonald 44 (34); Vinay Kumar 3/29 (4 overs)

Indians won by 15 runs
Grace Road, Leicester
Umpires: Alex Wharf (Eng) and Peter Willey (Eng)

- Leicestershire won the toss and elected to field.

== Test series ==
England won the Test series 4–0, their third whitewash in series of more than three Test matches. In winning the series by more than two clear matches, England took India's place at the top of the ICC Test Championship, while India dropped to third place. The men of the series were England's Stuart Broad – who took 25 wickets in the series – and Rahul Dravid – who scored three centuries.

=== 1st Test ===
21–25 July 2011
Scorecard

England	v	India
474/8d (131.4 overs); Kevin Pietersen 202* (326); Praveen Kumar 5/106 (40.3 overs)		286 (95.5 overs); Rahul Dravid 103* (220); Stuart Broad 4/37 (22 overs)
269/6d (71 overs); Matt Prior 103* (120); Ishant Sharma 4/59 (22 overs)		261 (96.3 overs); Suresh Raina 78 (136); James Anderson 5/65 (28 overs)

England won by 196 runs
Lord's, London
Umpires: Asad Rauf (Pak) and Billy Bowden (NZ)
Player of the match: Kevin Pietersen (Eng)

- India won the toss and elected to field.
- Rain and bad light on day 1 reduced play to 49.2 overs.

This match was the 2,000th Test in the history of cricket and the 100th between India and England. India's tour got off to the worst possible start with Zaheer Khan injuring himself in the 42nd over shortly before tea, leaving India with just three regular bowlers for the rest of the match. England made the most of the depleted bowling, with Pietersen scoring a rapid imperious undefeated double-century as England declared with the score on 474/8. India responded well initially, but were eventually bowled out for 286 with Rahul Dravid's slow defiant century being the saving grace. England worked themselves into a position of control in the second innings, with India's bowling lacking any penetration. India were bowled out on the final day of the Test with nearly 30 overs to spare.

=== 2nd Test ===
29 July – 2 August 2011
Scorecard

England	v	India
221 (68.4 overs); Stuart Broad 64 (66); Praveen Kumar 3/45 (22 overs)		288 (91.1 overs); Rahul Dravid 117 (235); Stuart Broad 6/46 (24.1 overs)
544 (120.2 overs); Ian Bell 159 (206); Praveen Kumar 4/124 (36 overs)		158 (47.4 overs); Sachin Tendulkar 56 (86); Tim Bresnan 5/48 (12 overs)

England won by 319 runs
Trent Bridge, Nottingham
Umpires: Asad Rauf (Pak) and Marais Erasmus (SA)
Player of the match: Stuart Broad (Eng)

- India won the toss and elected to field.

In their first innings, England were 124/8 but recovered well. Stuart Broad and Graeme Swann had a partnership of 73 runs and salvaged the innings for England who were eventually dismissed for 221. In reply, India reached 267/4 with Rahul Dravid and Yuvraj Singh sharing a partnership of 128 runs before England bowler Stuart Broad took a hat-trick, dismissing MS Dhoni (caught Anderson), Harbhajan Singh (lbw) and Praveen Kumar (bowled) and finished with his best Test figures to date, with 6 for 46. This hat-trick was part of a remarkable spell of 16 balls in which Broad got five wickets without conceding a run. India were dismissed for 288, a lead of 67. Ian Bell was involved in a controversial run-out decision with the final delivery before tea on the third day when he was on 139 not out. Bell walked off the field, believing that the previous shot played by Eoin Morgan had gone to the boundary for four. However, the ball had been kept in play and was thrown back to the middle, where India removed the bails. It was referred to the third umpire, Billy Bowden, who gave Bell out. During the tea interval, England captain Andrew Strauss and coach Andy Flower met with the Indian captain Dhoni and their coach Duncan Fletcher and they agreed to withdraw the appeal. Bell was eventually dismissed for 159. England continued to bat strongly with allrounder Tim Bresnan getting 90 runs. England were eventually bowled out for 544, setting India a target of 478 runs to win. India's response to this target was poor and they slumped to 68/6 at tea on day 4. England dismissed India's top second innings scorer, Sachin Tendulkar for 56 soon after tea. England wrapped the game up in the evening session, dismissing India for 158, winning by 319 runs.

=== 3rd Test ===
10–14 August 2011
Scorecard

India	v	England
224 (62.2 overs); MS Dhoni 77 (96); Stuart Broad 4/53 (17 overs)		710/7d (188.1 overs); Alastair Cook 294 (545); Amit Mishra 3/150 (43 overs)
244 (55.3 overs); MS Dhoni 74* (79); James Anderson 4/85 (18 overs)

England won by an innings and 242 runs
Edgbaston, Birmingham
Umpires: Steve Davis (Aus) and Simon Taufel (Aus)
Player of the match: Alastair Cook (Eng)

- England won the toss and elected to field.
- Start of play on Day 2 delayed due to wet ground.
- Lunch taken early on Day 3 due to rain.

India were put into bat by England and were reduced to 111 for 7, before making a recovery to finish 224 all out on the first day. Alastair Cook made a mammoth 294 batting for two whole days, the sixth highest score by an English batsman, as England finished on 710 for 7. Indian batsman Virender Sehwag was dismissed for golden duck in both innings of the match – a king pair. Sachin Tendulkar was run-out on 40, after backing up MS Dhoni, when Dhoni's strike was deflected back onto the stumps by Graeme Swann.

=== 4th Test ===
18–22 August 2011
Scorecard

England	v	India
591/6d (153 overs); Ian Bell 235 (364); Sreesanth 3/123 (29 overs)		300 (94 overs); Rahul Dravid 146* (266); Tim Bresnan 3/54 (17 overs)
		283 (91 overs) (f/o); Sachin Tendulkar 91 (172); Graeme Swann 6/106 (38 overs)

England won by an innings and 8 runs
The Oval, London
Umpires: Simon Taufel (Aus) and Rod Tucker (Aus)
Player of the match: Ian Bell (Eng)

- England won the toss and elected to bat.
- Rain on day 1 limited play to 26 overs.
- Rain on day 3 limited play to 63 overs.

=== Statistics ===
==== Individual ====
Statistic	England		India	
Most series runs	Kevin Pietersen	533	Rahul Dravid	461
Highest innings	Alastair Cook	294	Rahul Dravid	146*
Most centuries	Kevin Pietersen; Ian Bell	2	Rahul Dravid	3
Most fifties	Kevin Pietersen; Matt Prior; Stuart Broad; Tim Bresnan	2	Sachin Tendulkar; MS Dhoni; VVS Laxman	2
Most wickets	Stuart Broad	25	Praveen Kumar	15
Most five-wicket hauls	Stuart Broad; James Anderson; Tim Bresnan; Graeme Swann	1	Praveen Kumar	1
Best innings figures	Stuart Broad	24.1–8–46–6	Praveen Kumar	40.3–10–106–5
Best match figures	Graeme Swann	69–11–208–9	Praveen Kumar	58–13–169–7
Most catches (wicket-keepers excluded)	Alastair Cook; Andrew Strauss	5	Rahul Dravid; Suresh Raina	4
Most stumpings	Matt Prior	1	none	

==== Team ====
Statistic	England	India
Highest team innings	710/7d	300
Lowest team innings	221	158
Tosses won	2	2

==== Other ====
- Kevin Pietersen reached 6,000 Test runs when he reached 172 in the first innings of the First Test.
- Ian Bell reached 5,000 Test runs when he reached 208 in the first innings of the Fourth Test.

== T20I series ==
=== Only T20I ===
31 August 2011
Scorecard

India; 165 (19.4 overs)	v	England; 169/4 (19.3 overs)
Ajinkya Rahane 61 (39); Jade Dernbach 4/22 (3.4 overs)		Eoin Morgan 49 (27); Munaf Patel 2/25 (4 overs)

England won by 6 wickets
Old Trafford, Manchester
Umpires: Rob Bailey (Eng) and Richard Illingworth (Eng)
Player of the match: Jade Dernbach (Eng)

- India won the toss and elected to bat.
- Alex Hales and Jos Buttler (both Eng); Rahul Dravid and Ajinkya Rahane (both Ind) made their T20I debuts.

== ODI series ==
=== 1st ODI ===
3 September 2011
Scorecard

India; 274/7 (50 overs)	v	England; 27/2 (7.2 overs)
Parthiv Patel 95 (107); Tim Bresnan 2/54 (10 overs)		Jonathan Trott 14* (14); Praveen Kumar 2/11 (4 overs)

No result
Riverside Ground, Chester-le-Street
Umpires: Billy Doctrove (WI) and Richard Illingworth (Eng)

- England won the toss and elected to field.
- Match abandoned due to heavy rain.

=== 2nd ODI ===
6 September 2011
Scorecard

India; 187/8 (23 overs)	v	England; 188/3 (22.1 overs)
Ajinkya Rahane 54 (47); Graeme Swann 3/33 (5 overs)		Alastair Cook 80* (63); Ravichandran Ashwin 2/42 (5 overs)

England won by 7 wickets
Rose Bowl, Southampton
Umpires: Rob Bailey (Eng) and Billy Doctrove (WI)
Player of the match: Alastair Cook (Eng)

- England won the toss and elected to field.
- Match reduced to 23 overs per side due to rain.

=== 3rd ODI ===
9 September 2011
Scorecard

India; 234/7 (50 overs)	v	England; 218/7 (41.5 overs)
Ravindra Jadeja 78 (89); James Anderson 3/48 (9 overs)		Craig Kieswetter 51 (46); Ravichandran Ashwin 3/40 (9 overs)

England won by 3 wickets (D/L)
The Oval, London
Umpires: Marais Erasmus (SA) and Nigel Llong (Eng)
Player of the match: Ravindra Jadeja (Ind)

- England won the toss and elected to field.
- England innings reduced to 43 overs due to rain.

=== 4th ODI ===
11 September 2011
Scorecard

India; 280/5 (50 overs)	v	England; 270/8 (48.5 overs)
Suresh Raina 84 (75); Graeme Swann 2/49 (9 overs)		Ravi Bopara 96 (111); RP Singh 3/59 (9 overs)

Match tied (D/L)
Lord's, London
Umpires: Marais Erasmus (SA) and Richard Illingworth (Eng)
Player of the match: Ravi Bopara (Eng) and Suresh Raina (Ind)

- England won the toss and elected to field.
- No Play was Possible due to rain

=== 5th ODI ===
16 September 2011
Scorecard

India; 304/6 (50 overs)	v	England; 241/4 (32.2 overs)
Virat Kohli 107 (93); Graeme Swann 3/34 (9 overs)		Jonathan Trott 63 (60); Vinay Kumar 1/42 (6.2 overs)

England won by 6 wickets (D/L)
Sophia Gardens, Cardiff
Umpires: Billy Doctrove (WI) and Nigel Llong (Eng)
Player of the match: Jonny Bairstow (Eng)

- England won the toss and elected to field.
- England innings reduced to 34 overs due to rain.
- Jonny Bairstow (Eng) made his ODI debut.
