= 2009 Twenty20 Cup Midlands/Wales/West Division =

2009 Twenty20 Cup Midlands/Wales/West Division (Part of the 2009 Twenty20 Cup)
- Administrator(s): England and Wales Cricket Board
- Cricket format: Twenty20
- Tournament format(s): Group stage
- Participants: Glamorgan Dragons; Gloucestershire Gladiators; Northamptonshire Steelbacks; Somerset Sabres; Warwickshire Bears; Worcestershire Royals
- Matches: 30

The Midlands/Wales/West Division of the 2009 Twenty20 Cup determined which counties would qualify for the knockout stage of the 2009 Twenty20 Cup. Northamptonshire and Warwickshire qualified automatically, while Somerset qualified as the best of the third-place finishers.

== Table ==
Team	Pld	W	L	T	N/R	Pts	Net R/R
Northamptonshire Steelbacks	10	7	2	0	1	15	+0.583
Warwickshire Bears	10	7	3	0	0	14	+0.236
Somerset Sabres	10	6	3	0	1	13	+0.417
Worcestershire Royals	10	5	5	0	0	10	+0.581
Gloucestershire Gladiators	10	2	8	0	0	4	−0.661
Glamorgan Dragons	10	2	8	0	0	4	−1.031

== Matches ==
=== 25 May ===
25 May
Scorecard

Northamptonshire Steelbacks; 176/6 (20 overs)	v	Warwickshire Bears; 159/8 (20 overs)
N Boje 45 (30); JS Patel 2/29 [4]		JO Troughton 53 (39); IJ Harvey 4/18 [4]

Northamptonshire won by 17 runs
County Ground, Northampton
Umpires: RJ Bailey and B Dudleston
Player of the match: IJ Harvey (N'hants)

25 May
Scorecard

Worcestershire Royals; 145/7 (20 overs)	v	Gloucestershire Gladiators; 122 (17.4 overs)
AA Noffke 34 (20); SP Kirby 3/41 [4]		WTS Porterfield 25 (26); ID Fisher 3/16 [3]

Worcestershire won by 23 runs
New Road, Worcester
Umpires: JW Holder and G Sharp
Player of the match: ID Fisher (Worcs)

25 May
(day/night)
Scorecard

Somerset Sabres; 113/6 (20 overs)	v	Glamorgan Dragons; 112/9 (20 overs)
Z de Bruyn 70 (63); JWM Dalryple 2/24 [4]		BJ Wright 29 (36); MTC Waller 3/17 [4]

Somerset won by 1 run
SWALEC Stadium, Cardiff
Umpires: NGC Cowley and RK Illingworth
Player of the match: Z de Bruyn (Somst)

=== 27 May ===
27 May
Scorecard

Warwickshire Bears; 187/5 (20 overs)	v	Somerset Sabres; 190/5 (19.4 overs)
JO Troughton 50 (29); MTC Waller 2/38 [4]		Z de Bruyn 72 (44); KHD Barker 2/33 [4]

Somerset won by 5 wickets
County Ground, Taunton
Umpires: TE Jesty and JW Lloyds
Player of the match: Z de Bruyn (Somst)

27 May
(day/night)
Scorecard

Glamorgan Dragons; 166/6 (20 overs)	v	Gloucestershire Gladiators; 127 (19 overs)
MJ Cosgrove 52 (39); GM Hussain 2/41 [4]		J Lewis 30* (25); RE Watkins 5/16 [4]

Glamorgan won by 39 runs
SWALEC Stadium, Cardiff
Umpires: RJ Bailey and VA Holder
Player of the match: MJ Cosgrove and RE Watkins (Glam)

=== 29 May ===
29 May
Scorecard

Northamptonshire Steelbacks; 195/3 (20 overs)	v	Glamorgan; 155/9 (20 overs)
IJ Harvey 64 (37); DA Cosker 2/32 [4]		MJ Cosgrove 40 (22); JJ van der Wath 3/23 [4]

Northamptonshire won by 40 runs
County Ground, Northampton
Umpires: RJ Bailey and SA Garratt
Player of the match: IJ Harvey (N'hants)

29 May
Scorecard

Gloucestershire Gladiators; 162/8 (20 overs)	v	Somerset Sabres; 141/5 (20 overs)
CM Spearman 51 (29); AC Thomas 3/31 [4]		PD Trego 44* (32); SP Kirby 2/17 [4]

Gloucestershire won by 21 runs
County Ground, Taunton
Umpires: NGC Cowley and TE Jesty
Player of the match: CM Spearman (Gloucs)

29 May
Scorecard

Worcestershire Royals; 148/8 (20 overs)	v	Warwickshire Bears; 149/3 (18.2 overs)
SM Davies 73 (48); KHD Barker 4/19 [4]		JO Troughton 58 (44); AA Noffke 2/27 [4]

Warwickshire won by 7 wickets
Edgbaston, Birmingham
Umpires: NGB Cook and VA Holder
Player of the match: KHD Barker (Warks)

=== 30 May ===
30 May
Scorecard

Worcestershire Royals; 140/5 (20 overs)	v	Northamptonshire Steelbacks; 142/4 (19 overs)
SC Moore 62* (52); DJ Willey 3/9 [3]		NJ O'Brien 48 (38); DKH Mitchell 2/26 [4]

Northamptonshire won by 6 wickets
New Road, Worcester
Umpires: B Dudleston and RT Robinson
Player of the match: JJ van der Wath (N'hants)

30 May
Scorecard

Glamorgan Dragons; 129/8 (20 overs)	v	Warwickshire Bears; 133/4 (19.1 overs)
JWM Dalrymple 50 (53); NM Carter 3/16 [4]		IJL Trott 55 (50); GJP Kruger 2/18 [3]

Warwickshire won by 6 wickets
SWALEC Stadium, Cardiff
Umpires: JW Lloyds and JF Steele
Player of the match: NM Carter (Warks)

=== 1 June ===
1 June
Scorecard

Worcestershire Royals; 188/5 (20 overs)	v	Gloucestershire Gladiators; 175/8 (20 overs)
VS Solanki 51 (35); SP Kirby 2/28 [4]		APR Gidman 64 (50); AA Noffke 2/25 [4]

Worcestershire won by 13 runs
County Ground, Bristol
Umpires: TE Jesty and P Willey
Player of the match: VS Solanki (Worcs)

1 June
Scorecard

Glamorgan Dragons; 128/7 (20 overs)	v	Somerset Sabres; 132/0 (14.4 overs)
JWM Dalrymple 56 (50); Z de Bruyn 2/2 [1]		ME Trescothick 69* (47)

Somerset won by 10 wickets
County Ground, Taunton
Umpires: VA Holder and JW Lloyds
Player of the match: ME Trescothick (Somst)

1 June
Scorecard

Northamptonshire Steelbacks; 155/7 (20 overs)	v	Warwickshire Bears; 131/6 (20 overs)
RA White 59 (47); NM Carter 2/16 [3]		IJL Trott 44 (34); DJ Willey 2/17 [4]

Northamptonshire won by 24 runs
Edgbaston, Birmingham
Umpires: RK Illingworth and DJ Millns
Player of the match: DJ Willey (N'hants)

=== 3 June ===
3 June
Scorecard

Northamptonshire Steelbacks; 162 (19.5 overs)	v	Gloucestershire Gladiators; 152/7 (20 overs)
IJ Harvey 48 (38); J Lewis 4/37 [3.5]		HJH Marshall 42 (22); DJ Willey 2/15 [3]

Northamptonshire won by 10 runs
County Ground, Bristol
Umpires: MJD Bodenham and JW Lloyds
Player of the match: IJ Harvey (N'hants)

3 June
Scorecard

Worcestershire Royals; 165/6 (20 overs)	v	Somerset Sabres; 157 (20 overs)
BF Smith 35* (22); AV Suppiah 3/25 [3]		PD Trego 58* (31); GJ Batty 3/21 [4]

Worcestershire won by 8 runs
New Road, Worcester
Umpires: SA Garratt and G Sharp
Player of the match: GJ Batty (Worcs)

=== 4 June ===
4 June
Scorecard

Worcestershire Royals; 164/6 (20 overs)	v	Glamorgan Dragons; 135 (20 overs)
SC Moore 42 (38); JWM Dalrymple 2/19 [2]		BJ Wright 30 (24); GM Andrew 3/19 [3]

Worcestershire won by 29 runs
SWALEC Stadium, Cardiff
Umpires: MJD Bodenham and SA Garratt
Player of the match: GJ Batty (Worcs)

4 June
Scorecard

Somerset Sabres; 163/3 (20 overs)	v	Northamptonshire Steelbacks; 133/9 (20 overs)
Z de Bruyn 83 (52); IJ Harvey 1/17 [2]		IJ Harvey 30 (17); CM Willoughby 4/29 [4]

Somerset won by 30 runs
County Ground, Northampton
Umpires: MA Gough and RT Robinson
Player of the match: Z de Bruyn (Somst)

4 June
Scorecard

Gloucestershire Gladiators; 135/7 (20 overs)	v	Warwickshire Bears; 139/6 (19 overs)
GP Hodnett 39 (36); KHD Barker 2/16 [4]		IJ Westwood 44 (37); GM Hussain 2/20 [3]

Warwickshire won by 4 wickets
Edgbaston, Birmingham
Umpires: DJ Millns and P Willey
Player of the match: IJ Westwood (Warks)

=== 22 June ===
22 June
Scorecard

Gloucestershire Gladiators; 141 (19.4 overs)	v	Warwickshire Bears; 144/3 (16.1 overs)
DO Brown 33 (31); JS Patel 3/15 [3.4]		IJL Trott 73 (52); V Banerjee 2/30 [4]

Warwickshire won by 7 wickets
County Ground, Bristol
Umpires: NGC Cowley and VA Holder
Player of the match: IJL Trott (Warks)

=== 23 June ===
23 June
Scorecard

Northamptonshire Steelbacks; 133 (20 overs)	v	Gloucestershire Gladiators; 134/8 (19.5 overs)
IJ Harvey 43 (36); GM Hussain 3/22 [4]		GP Hodnett 60 (46); N Boje 3/23 [4]

Gloucestershire won by 2 wickets
County Ground, Northampton
Umpires: RJ Bailey and RK Illingworth
Player of the match: GP Hodnett (Gloucs)

23 June
Scorecard

Worcestershire Royals; 176/8 (20 overs)	v	Somerset Sabres; 177/3 (19 overs)
BF Smith 44 (24); CM Willoughby 2/24 [4]		JC Hildreth 48* (37); DKH Mitchell 1/11 [2]

Somerset won by 7 wickets
County Ground, Taunton
Umpires: VA Holder and JF Steele
Player of the match: JC Hildreth (Somst)

23 June
Scorecard

Glamorgan Dragons; 148/7 (20 overs)	v	Warwickshire Bears; 149/6 (18.5 overs)
JWM Dalrymple 63 (42); R Clarke 2/31 [4] JS Patel 2/31 [4]		IJL Trott 33 (17); AG Wharf 2/23 [3.5]

Warwickshire won by 4 wickets
Edgbaston, Birmingham
Umpires: SA Garratt and RA Kettleborough
Player of the match: R Clarke (Warks)

=== 24 June ===
24 June
Scorecard

Worcestershire Royals; 222/4 (20 overs)	v	Glamorgan Dragons; 121/6 (20 overs)
VS Solanki 100 (48); JWM Dalrymple 2/34 [3]		RDB Croft 52* (34); GJ Batty 2/28 [4]

Worcestershire won by 101 runs
New Road, Worcester
Umpires: NGB Cook and NGC Cowley
Player of the match: VS Solanki (Worcs)

=== 25 June ===
25 June
Scorecard

Northamptonshire Steelbacks; 49/0 (5 overs)	v	Somerset Sabres
IJ Harvey 27* (15)

No result
County Ground, Taunton
Umpires: RK Illingworth and JW Lloyds

- Rain stopped play in the fifth over.

=== 26 June ===
26 June
Scorecard

Worcestershire Royals; 162/6 (20 overs)	v	Warwickshire Bears; 166/3 (19.1 overs)
MM Ali 46 (39); KHD Barker 2/19 [2]		IJL Trott 86* (62); MM Ali 2/15 [2]

Warwickshire won by 7 wickets
New Road, Worcester
Umpires: JW Holder and RT Robinson
Player of the match: IJL Trott (Warks)

26 June
Scorecard

Gloucestershire Gladiators; 173 (19.3 overs)	v	Somerset Sabres; 175/7 (19 overs)
HJH Marshall 36 (23); AC Thomas 3/31 [3.3]		C Kieswetter 84 (42); SP Kirby 2/17 [3]

Somerset won by 3 wickets
County Ground, Bristol
Umpires: IJ Gould and RK Illingworth
Player of the match: C Kieswetter (Somst)

26 June
Scorecard

Northamptonshire Steelbacks; 157/7 (20 overs)	v	Glamorgan Dragons; 137/9 (20 overs)
MH Wessels 66* (44); JAR Harris 4/23 [4]		JWM Dalrymple 33 (28); N Boje 3/14 [4]

Northamptonshire won by 20 runs
SWALEC Stadium, Cardiff
Umpires: NGC Cowley and JF Steele
Player of the match: MH Wessels (N'hants)

=== 28 June ===
28 June
Scorecard

Gloucestershire Gladiators; 148/7 (20 overs)	v	Glamorgan Dragons; 151/4 (18.3 overs)
DO Brown 56 (35); RE Watkins 3/23 [4]		BJ Wright 55* (39); AJ Ireland 1/12 [2]

Glamorgan won by 6 wickets
County Ground, Bristol
Umpires: RK Illingworth and TE Jesty
Player of the match: BJ Wright (Glam)

28 June
Scorecard

Worcestershire Royals; 109/9 (20 overs)	v	Northamptonshire Steelbacks; 110/3 (18 overs)
MM Ali 28 (41); AJ Hall 4/19 [4]		SD Peters 61* (52); ID Fisher 2/18 [4]

Northamptonshire won by 7 wickets
County Ground, Northampton
Umpires: MR Benson and RA Kettleborough
Player of the match: AJ Hall (N'hants)

28 June
Scorecard

Warwickshire Bears; 193/6 (20 overs)	v	Somerset Sabres; 192/7 (20 overs)
JO Troughton 62 (41); AC Thomas 2/33 [4]		Z de Bruyn 40 (33); JS Patel 3/23 [4]

Warwickshire won by 1 run
Edgbaston, Birmingham
Umpires: JW Holder and NA Mallender
Player of the match: JS Patel (Warks)
