= 2009 English cricket season =

County Championship
- Champions: Durham
- Runners-up: Nottinghamshire
- Most runs: Marcus Trescothick (1,817)
- Most wickets: Danish Kaneria (75)

Friends Provident Trophy
- Champions: Hampshire Hawks
- Runners-up: Sussex Sharks
- Most runs: Ed Joyce (546)
- Most wickets: Chris Schofield (20)

NatWest Pro40
- Champions: Sussex Sharks
- Runners-up: Somerset Sabres
- Most runs: Nick Compton (458)
- Most wickets: Ben Phillips (14)

Twenty20 Cup
- Champions: Sussex Sharks
- Runners-up: Somerset Sabres
- Most runs: Jonathan Trott (525)
- Most wickets: Alfonso Thomas (18)

PCA Player of the Year
- Marcus Trescothick

Wisden Cricketers of the Year
- Stuart Broad; Michael Clarke; Graham Onions; Matt Prior; Graeme Swann

The 2009 English cricket season was the 110th in which the County Championship had been an official competition. Four regular tournaments were played: The LV County Championship (first-class), Friends Provident Trophy (50 Over), NatWest Pro40 League (40 Over) and the Twenty20 Cup (T20). All four tournaments featured the eighteen classic county cricket teams, although the Friends Provident Trophy also featured sides from Ireland and Scotland.

On the international scene England hosted the 2009 ICC World Twenty20. Australia toured England to compete for the Ashes; it was the 74th test series between the two sides with England winning 2–1. The West Indies also toured losing the Wisden Trophy test series 2–0 to England.

== Test Series ==
=== Ashes ===
Cumulative record – Test wins	1876–2009
England	99
Australia	132
Drawn	90

== Other winners ==
- Minor Counties Championship – Buckinghamshire
- MCCA Knockout Trophy – Norfolk
