= David Stiff =

English cricketer (born 1984)

Personal information
- Full name: David Alexander Stiff
- Born: 20 October 1984 (age 42); Dewsbury, England
- Nickname: Stifler
- Height: 6 ft 6 in (1.98 m)
- Batting: Right-handed
- Bowling: Right-arm fast
- Role: Bowler

Domestic team information
- Years: Team
- 2001–2003: Yorkshire
- 2004–2006: Kent
- 2006–2007: Leicestershire
- 2008–2010: Somerset (squad no. 18)

Career statistics
| Competition | First-class | List A |
|---|---|---|
| Matches | 20 | 1 |
| Runs scored | 321 | – |
| Batting average | 22.92 | – |
| 100s/50s | 0/0 | – |
| Top score | 49 | – |
| Balls bowled | 2578 | 30 |
| Wickets | 43 | 1 |
| Bowling average | 44.32 | 27.00 |
| 5 wickets in innings | 1 | 0 |
| 10 wickets in match | 0 | 0 |
| Best bowling | 5/91 | 1/27 |
| Catches/stumpings | 1/– | 0/– |
- Source: Cricinfo, 13 June 2010

David Stiff (born 20 October 1984) is an English cricketer. He is a right-handed batsman and a right-arm fast bowler. He was born in Dewsbury and educated at Silcoates School, Wakefield and Batley Grammar School.

The former-Yorkshire fast bowler made headlines for a spell of bowling against Uganda of 4 for 7, identical to fellow bowler Tim Bresnan.

In 2004 Stiff decided to leave Yorkshire amid a lot of interest from other counties. He apparently had interest from a dozen counties and took the opportunity to play for Kent. He toured Australia with the Under-17s in 2001, and with the Under-19s in 2003, also playing in the Under-19s World Cup in Bangladesh.

In 2007, Stiff was released by Kent and went to Leicestershire. At the start of the 2009 season Stiff joined Somerset on a two-month trial and on 14 May 2009 he accepted an extension to his contract which would last until the end of that season. In August 2010, Somerset's Director of Cricket, Brian Rose announced that Stiff's contract would not be renewed for the 2011 season.
