= Andrew Hurry =

Andy Hurry
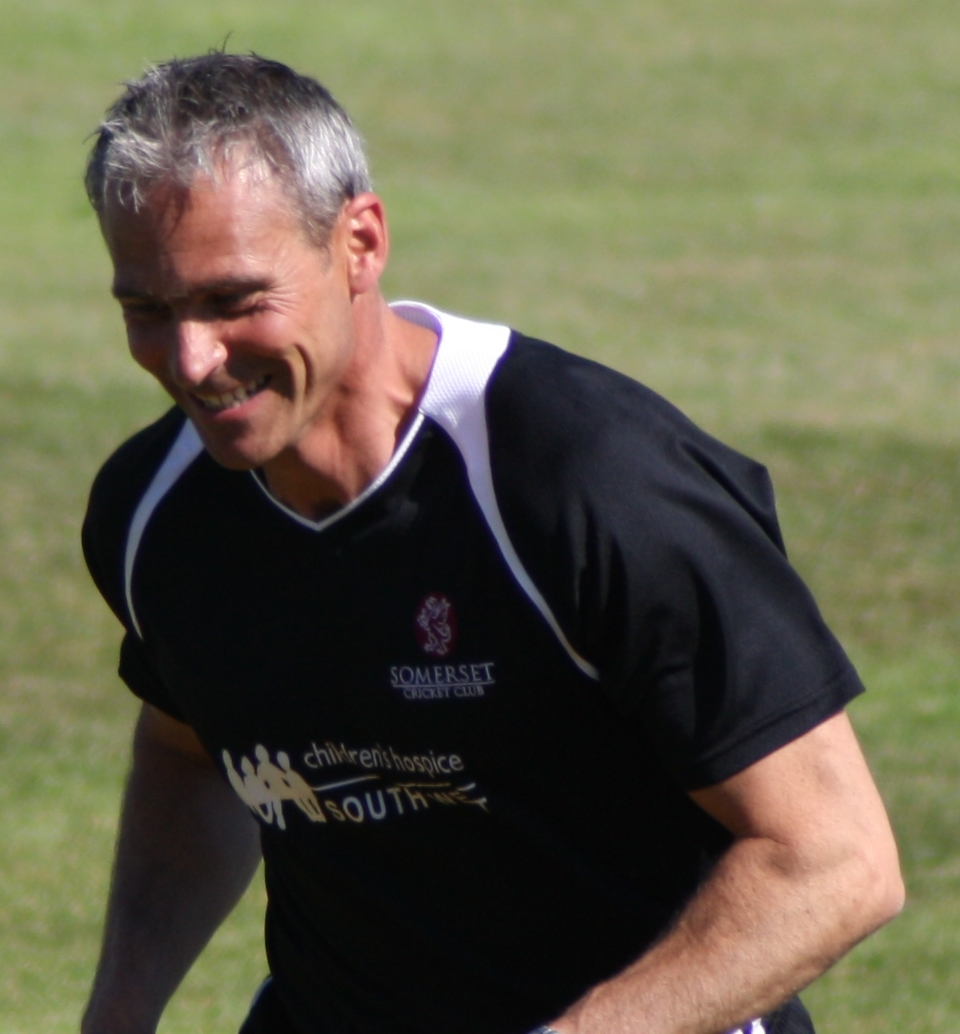

Personal information
- Full name: Andrew Hurry
- Born: 15 October 1964 (age 61)
- Role: Director of Cricket

Domestic team information
- Years: Team
- 2001–04: Somerset
- 2005: United Arab Emirates
- 2006–13: Somerset
- 2014–17: England and Wales Cricket Board
- 2017–present: Somerset

Andrew Hurry (born 15 October 1964) is director of cricket at Somerset County Cricket Club.

A former Royal Marines fitness instructor and amateur cricketer with both Taunton and Wembdon Cricket Clubs, Hurry joined Somerset in March 2001 as Fitness Instructor, introducing yoga as an activity for the 2002 season.

For the 2005 season, Hurry was named Second XI coach, but left to coach the United Arab Emirates national cricket team.

Hurry rejoined Somerset as First XI coach in February 2006 to replace England bound Mark Garaway, having achieved England and Wales Cricket Board coaching qualifications up to Level Four.

In the 2007 season, with Justin Langer as captain and Hurry as coach, Somerset won the County Championship second division with 10 victories in 16 matches, after finishing last in 2006. The county was also promoted in the Natwest Pro40 one-day competition. By June 2008 the county led the first division of the County Championship.

In September 2009, Hurry signed an extended contract with the club, tying him to Somerset until 2012. As part of a restructuring at the end of the 2013 season, Hurry's role as first XI coach was subsumed into Director of Cricket David Nosworthy's role with Hurry becoming Director of High Performance responsible for overseeing the transition of young cricketers into the First XI environment.

At the end of the 2014 season, Hurry was appointed by the ECB as the new head of the England Development Programme.

In October 2017, Hurry returned to Somerset for a third time after being appointed the club's new Director of Cricket.
