= Ben Phillips (cricketer) =

English cricketer (born 1974)

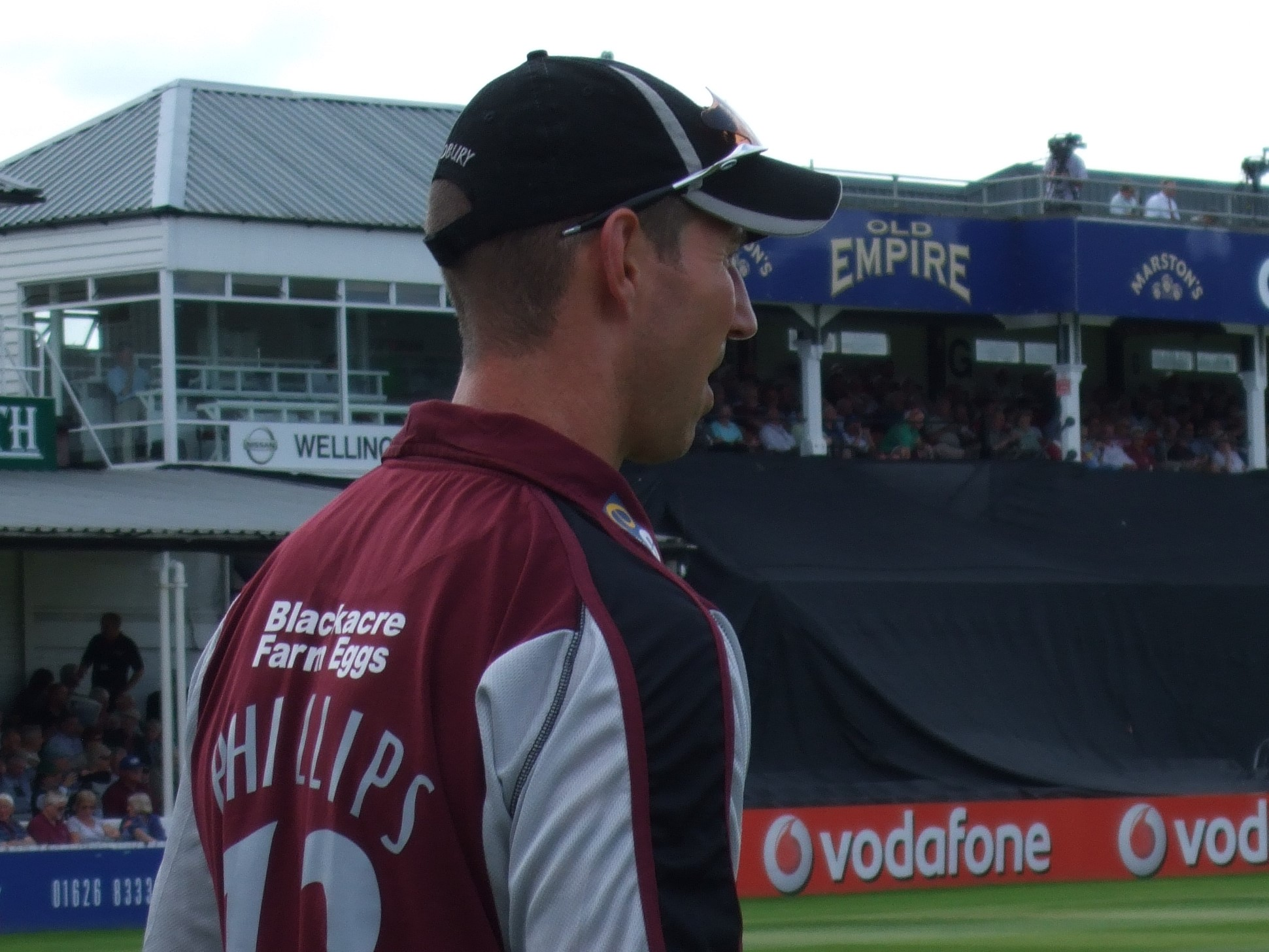

Personal information
- Full name: Ben James Phillips
- Born: 30 September 1974 (age 52); Lewisham, London
- Height: 6 ft 6 in (1.98 m)
- Batting: Right-handed
- Bowling: Right-arm fast-medium

Domestic team information
- Years: Team
- 1993–2002: Kent
- 2002–2006: Northamptonshire
- 2007–2010: Somerset
- 2011–2013: Nottinghamshire

Career statistics
Competition	FC	LA	T20
Matches	124	137	63
Runs scored	2,991	1,042	438
Batting average	21.36	18.60	15.64
100s/50s	1/16	0/1	0/0
Top score	100*	51*	41*
Balls bowled	17,200	5,556	1281
Wickets	271	153	62
Bowling average	30.00	30.21	27.79
5 wickets in innings	5	0	0
10 wickets in match	0	0	0
Best bowling	6/29	4/25	4/18
Catches/stumpings	38/–	37/–	19/–
- Source: Cricinfo, 30 January 2016

Ben James Phillips (born 30 September 1974) is an English cricketer who played for Nottinghamshire County Cricket Club until his release in 2013. He is a right-handed batsman and right-arm fast-medium pace bowler.

== Career ==
Phillips began his career at Kent, appearing for their Second XI regularly throughout the late 1990s. His made his first-class cricket debut for the club against Sussex early in the 1996 season, taking four wickets in the match. He failed to impress during the following match against Leicestershire, taking no wickets, and only made one more first-class appearance in the season. Despite scoring his maiden first-class century in 1997 against Lancashire and twice taking 5 wickets in an innings, he dropped out of the first-class game at the end of the 1998 season after 27 appearances for Kent. Between 1999 and 2001 he turned out regularly for Kent Second XI and played a spell of three one-day matches for the first team.

He joined Northamptonshire in 2002 but it was not until 2004 that he became a regular member of the first team; he was awarded his county cap in 2005. In 53 first-class matches for Northamptonshire he averaged about 23 with the bat and about 31 with the ball. His highest first-class score for Northamptonshire was 90 against Warwickshire in 2004 and his best bowling was 6/29 against Cambridge University in 2006.

At the end of the 2006 season, he asked to be released from his contract at Northamptonshire, as his family had not settled in the area. He joined Somerset the following season. Injury hampered his chances to make a serious impression at Somerset, and by late 2009 he was primarily considered a squad player, with Director of Cricket Brian Rose stating "[Somerset] need people of Ben's calibre to come into the side when it is weakened for any reason."

He joined Nottinghamshire in 2011 and although injury disrupted his first season, he was a mainstay of their County Championship attack in 2012 taking 30 wickets at 27.10.
