= Zander de Bruyn =

South African cricketer (born 1975)

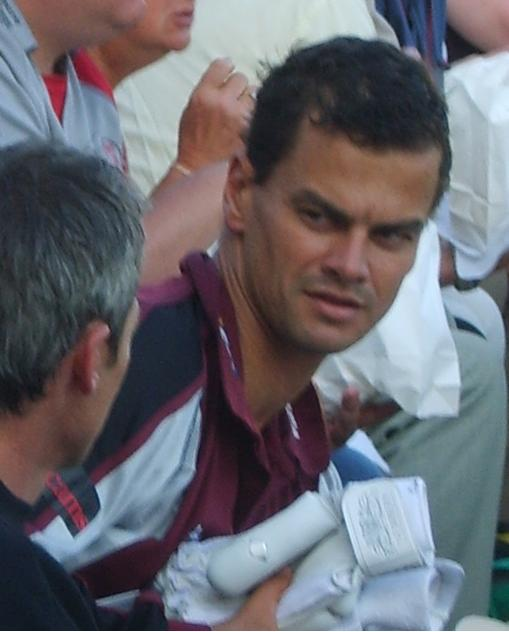

Personal information
- Full name: Zander de Bruyn
- Born: 5 July 1975 (age 51); Johannesburg, South Africa
- Batting: Right-handed
- Bowling: Right-arm fast-medium
- Role: Allrounder

International information
- National side: South Africa
- Test debut (cap 293): 20 November 2004 v India
- Last Test: 17 December 2004 v England

Domestic team information
- Years: Team
- 1995–1997: Transvaal
- 1997–2002: Gauteng
- 2002–2006: Easterns
- 2005: Worcestershire
- 2004–2006: Titans
- 2006–2009: Warriors
- 2008–2010: Somerset
- 2009–2014: Highveld Lions (squad no. 58)
- 2011–2013: Surrey

Career statistics
Competition	Test	FC	LA	T20
Matches	3	242	242	125
Runs scored	155	14,259	6,085	2,187
Batting average	38.75	38.33	35.37	29.95
100s/50s	0/1	29/78	6/37	0/9
Top score	83	266*	122*	95*
Balls bowled	216	20,051	5,465	1,147
Wickets	3	285	166	62
Bowling average	30.66	39.35	30.84	27.09
5 wickets in innings	0	4	1	0
10 wickets in match	0	0	0	0
Best bowling	2/32	7/67	5/44	4/18
Catches/stumpings	0/–	155/–	60/–	23/–
- Source: CricketArchive, 26 April 2016

Zander de Bruyn (born 5 July 1975) is a former South African cricketer. He was a right-handed batsman and a right-arm medium-fast bowler. He played three Test matches for South Africa, and played domestic cricket for the Highveld Lions. He was a batting all-rounder whose elegance at the crease drew comparisons with former South African captain Hansie Cronje. His medium-pace bowling was able to take the pressure off the front-line bowlers, with his ability to restrict the run-rate and take partnership-breaking wickets.

== Career ==
De Bruyn began his career with Transvaal cricket team (later Gauteng cricket team). However, his career only really started to prosper when he joined Easterns in 2002. Having been out of a contract at Gauteng, and without an offer of a new one, he took a part-time job in a retail clothing firm Coach Ray Jennings offered him a place in the team on a pay-as-you-play basis, and de Bruyn returned to first-class cricket. In the 2003–04 SuperSport Series, after a missable first innings, de Bruyn top scored with 169 to help Easterns claim the title for the first time.

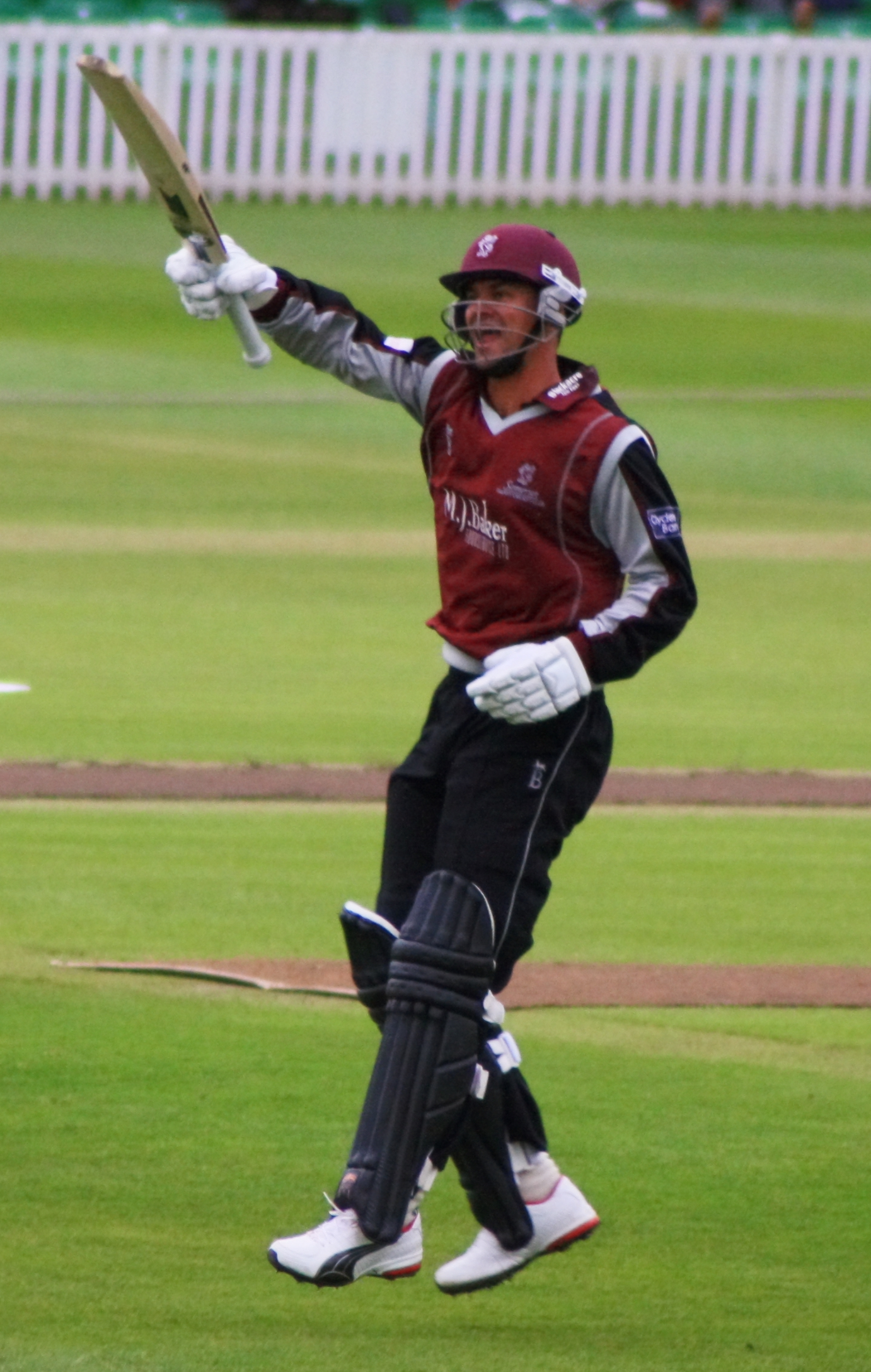
de Bruyn celebrates scoring a century for Somerset in 2010

His first-class batting average prior to this was a meagre 29.61, while his batting average since is over 40. In 2003–04 he became only the second player in South African cricket, after Barry Richards, to score 1000 domestic first-class runs in a season, in either the SuperSport Series or the Currie Cup.

De Bruyn's Test debut came against India in November 2004. He played in both Tests in the South Africans tour of India, scoring his career best Test score of 83 in the first innings of the first Test. He kept his place in the squad for the home series against England, playing in the first Test; but was subsequently dropped for the return of Jacques Kallis.

In 2005, he joined Worcestershire as a Kolpak player. During this time, he failed to impress; his first-class wickets costing almost a hundred runs each, and only a late season century against Somerset rescuing his batting average. He was part of the Titans squad that shared the 2005–06 SuperSport Series. The following season, he moved to the Warriors, but was limited to only five first-class appearances. In 2007–08, he posted his best bowling figures of 7/67 against previous club Titans. In both 2006–07 and 2007–08, he was a losing finalist in the MTN Domestic Championship.

In April 2008 de Bruyn signed for Somerset as a Kolpak player. He remained with them for the 2009 season, leading the team in Twenty20 Cup runs. In June 2009, it was announced that de Bruyn had signed for the Lions. On 3 December 2010, it was announced that de Bruyn had signed a one-year deal at Surrey as a Kolpak player. After this season he could obtain a British passport. de Bruyn was released by Surrey at the end of the 2013 season. In April 2014 he announced his retirement from playing the game.
