= List of Somerset County Cricket Club List A players =

Somerset County Cricket Club was formed in 1875, and first appeared in the County Championship in 1891. They played their first List A match in the 1963 Gillette Cup against Glamorgan. The players in this list have all played at least one List A match for Somerset. Somerset cricketers who have not represented the county in List A cricket are excluded from the list.

Players are listed in order of appearance, where players made their debut in the same match, they are ordered by batting order.

== Key ==
General

- † – Wicket-keeper
- First – Year of List A debut for Somerset
- Last – Year of latest List A match for Somerset
- Mat – Number of List A appearances for Somerset

Batting

- Runs – Runs scored in career
- HS – Highest score
- Avg – Runs scored per dismissal
- * – Batsman remained not out

Bowling

- Balls – Balls bowled in career
- Wkt – Wickets taken in career
- BBI – Best bowling in an innings
- Ave – Average runs per wicket

Fielding

- Ca – Catches taken
- St – Stumpings effected
All statistics correct as of the end of the English 2026 cricket season.

== List of players ==
Somerset County Cricket Club List A players
No.	Name	Nationality	First	Last	Mat	Runs	HS	Avg	Balls	Wkt	BBI	Ave	Ca	St	Ref(s)
No.	Name	Nationality	First	Last	Mat	Batting			Bowling				Fielding		Ref(s)
1	Graham Atkinson	England	1963	1966	10	297	72	29.70	0	–	–	–	1	0	
2	Roy Virgin †	England	1963	1972	84	1,938	123*	25.84	2	1	1/1	1.00	39	0	
3	Peter Wight	West Indies	1963	1965	6	56	38	9.33	0	–	–	–	2	0	
4	Bill Alley	Australia	1963	1968	16	281	58*	20.07	1,105	25	4/14	16.20	4	0	
5	Mervyn Kitchen	England	1963	1979	172	3,388	116	22.43	125	5	2/34	19.40	52	0	
6	Chris Greetham	England	1963	1966	10	150	44	15.00	253	3	1/1	51.33	6	0	
7	Ken Palmer	England	1963	1969	24	137	35	9.78	1,335	34	4/26	21.55	6	0	
8	Harold Stephenson †	England	1963	1963	1	4	4	4.00	0	–	–	–	1	0	
9	Brian Langford	England	1963	1973	66	441	56	12.97	2,585	65	4/73	24.24	19	0	
10	David Doughty	England	1963	1963	1	20	20	20.00	42	1	1/31	31.00	0	0	
11	Fred Rumsey	England	1963	1968	15	9	7	4.50	1,049	30	4/19	11.36	4	0	
12	Brian Roe	England	1964	1966	5	55	30	11.00	0	–	–	–	0	0	
13	Peter Eele †	England	1964	1964	2	10	6	5.00	0	–	–	–	2	0	
14	Geoff Hall	England	1964	1965	3	2	1*	2.00	216	8	5/34	13.62	3	0	
15	Colin Atkinson	England	1965	1967	12	153	42*	17.00	444	7	2/28	35.14	6	0	
16	Geoff Clayton †	England	1965	1967	12	87	35	12.42	0	–	–	–	22	2	
17	Peter Robinson	England	1965	1972	63	964	71*	22.41	210	8	3/17	12.87	25	0	
18	Roy Palmer	England	1966	1970	43	198	26	8.25	2,209	67	5/18	22.31	7	0	
19	Terry Willetts	England	1966	1967	3	27	22	9.00	0	–	–	–	2	0	
20	Graham Burgess	England	1966	1980	207	3,130	73	20.06	9,657	247	6/25	25.08	51	0	
21	Terry Barwell †	South Africa	1967	1968	4	62	30	15.50	0	–	–	–	3	0	
22	Tony Clarkson	England	1967	1971	50	762	102*	16.93	54	2	2/56	31.00	13	0	
23	Greg Chappell	Australia	1968	1969	17	476	128*	34.00	764	23	3/14	18.43	8	0	
24	Brian Rose	England	1969	1987	251	5,708	137*	27.98	204	7	3/25	21.71	63	0	
25	Charlie Carter †	England	1969	1969	6	11	10*	–	0	–	–	–	8	1	
26	John Roberts	England	1969	1970	11	13	12*	13.00	447	13	4/18	22.84	2	0	
27	Len Beel	England	1969	1969	1	1	1*	–	12	0	–	–	0	0	
28	Peter Denning	England	1969	1984	280	6,792	145	28.06	21	0	–	–	94	0	
29	Raymond Windsor	England	1969	1969	1	–	–	–	0	–	–	–	0	0	
30	Jim Galley	England	1969	1969	1	8	8	8.00	0	–	–	–	0	0	
31	Tom Cartwright	England	1970	1976	94	972	61	15.42	4,737	107	4/13	19.90	40	0	
32	Derek Taylor †	England	1970	1982	261	2,035	93	19.56	0	–	–	–	234	43	
33	Allan Jones	England	1970	1975	113	101	18*	3.48	5,482	164	6/34	21.94	14	0	
34	Maurice Hill	England	1970	1971	14	197	47	15.15	0	–	–	–	7	0	
35	Brian Close	England	1971	1977	126	2,658	131	23.94	1,328	41	4/9	22.92	37	0	
36	Kerry O'Keeffe	Australia	1971	1972	20	151	35	18.87	429	8	2/26	36.62	6	0	
37	Steve Wilkinson	England	1971	1974	25	327	70	16.35	0	–	–	–	6	0	
38	Hallam Moseley	West Indies	1971	1982	210	519	33	8.23	10,244	309	5/30	20.03	36	0	
39	Richard Cooper	England	1972	1972	13	343	95	28.58	6	0	–	–	4	0	
40	Jim Parks †	England	1973	1975	40	727	69	25.06	0	–	–	–	23	4	
41	Dennis Breakwell	England	1973	1983	148	1,059	44*	14.50	3,128	58	3/20	35.43	32	0	
42	Bob Clapp	England	1973	1976	39	24	8*	3.42	1,841	76	5/38	17.00	11	0	
43	Ian Botham	England	1973	1986	230	5,049	175*	30.41	10,786	300	4/10	23.38	106	0	
44	Viv Richards	West Indies	1974	1986	218	7,349	139*	39.94	3,539	93	6/24	26.46	97	0	
45	Phil Slocombe	England	1975	1983	78	829	46	14.80	0	–	–	–	19	0	
46	Keith Jennings	England	1975	1981	88	233	51*	9.70	4,052	104	4/11	24.70	15	0	
47	Vic Marks	England	1975	1989	250	3,623	81*	23.99	10,177	226	4/11	27.70	57	0	
48	Peter Roebuck	England	1975	1991	277	6,871	120	30.26	1,239	40	4/11	24.85	62	0	
49	Colin Dredge	England	1976	1988	209	464	28*	10.54	9,594	253	5/35	23.42	66	0	
50	David Gurr	England	1976	1978	11	7	4	2.33	456	7	2/21	39.57	1	0	
51	Martin Olive	England	1977	1977	1	2	2*	–	0	–	–	–	0	0	
52	Joel Garner	West Indies	1977	1986	128	703	59*	14.64	6,475	206	6/29	15.15	30	0	
53	Nigel Popplewell †	England	1979	1985	116	2,022	84	24.36	1,743	43	3/34	30.83	39	2	
54	Sunil Gavaskar	India	1980	1980	16	502	123	33.46	0	–	–	–	2	0	
55	Hugh Gore	West Indies	1980	1980	4	0	0*	–	192	4	3/19	15.25	1	0	
56	Jeremy Lloyds	England	1980	1984	62	592	51	14.43	239	3	2/1	52.66	19	0	
57	Mark Davis	England	1982	1987	59	134	28	7.44	2,613	50	3/21	34.54	15	0	
58	Neil Russom	England	1982	1982	1	–	–	–	0	–	–	–	1	0	
59	Trevor Gard †	England	1982	1989	81	240	34	12.00	0	–	–	–	57	13	
60	Gary Palmer	England	1982	1989	83	428	53	16.46	2,774	77	5/24	30.48	10	0	
61	Hugh Wilson	England	1983	1984	13	11	9*	–	606	14	3/42	31.28	3	0	
62	Richard Ollis	England	1983	1985	16	149	46	16.55	0	–	–	–	5	0	
63	Martin Crowe	New Zealand	1984	1988	44	1,476	155*	36.00	1,280	31	4/24	28.03	15	0	
64	Julian Wyatt	England	1984	1989	43	723	89	19.02	0	–	–	–	14	0	
65	Simon Turner †	England	1984	1985	8	23	8*	11.50	0	–	–	–	1	2	
66	Nigel Felton	England	1984	1988	62	1,269	96	24.40	6	0	–	–	17	0	
67	Murray Turner	England	1985	1986	17	91	22*	13.00	653	14	3/22	41.21	2	0	
68	Royston Sully	England	1985	1985	1	2	2	2.00	12	0	–	–	0	0	
69	Richard Harden	England	1985	1998	252	6,275	108*	30.91	25	0	–	–	81	0	
70	Richard Hayward	England	1985	1985	8	106	38*	26.50	0	–	–	–	1	0	
71	Paul Bail	England	1985	1986	2	22	18	11.00	0	–	–	–	0	0	
72	Andrew Jones	England	1985	1985	1	3	3	3.00	60	1	1/44	44.00	0	0	
73	Jon Atkinson	England	1985	1990	8	85	69	17.00	36	1	1/16	16.00	0	0	
74	Jon Hardy	England	1986	1990	63	1,417	109	25.30	0	–	–	–	25	0	
75	Ricky Bartlett	England	1986	1992	60	1,251	85	21.94	0	–	–	–	25	0	
76	Nick Taylor	England	1986	1986	18	42	28	8.40	815	29	5/51	20.72	4	0	
77	Rayner Blitz †	England	1986	1986	2	1	1	1.00	0	–	–	–	1	0	
78	Neil Burns †	England	1987	1993	154	1,678	58	19.51	0	–	–	–	152	29	
79	Graham Rose	England	1987	2002	280	4,937	148	24.32	12,139	298	4/16	28.67	62	0	
80	Adrian Jones	England	1987	1990	79	177	37	11.06	3,549	119	5/53	24.01	11	0	
81	Neil Mallender	England	1987	1994	136	500	31*	14.70	6,583	148	4/31	28.87	22	0	
82	Steve Waugh	Australia	1987	1988	17	750	140*	57.69	372	8	2/16	37.75	7	0	
83	Mark Harman	England	1987	1987	3	2	2	1.00	120	1	1/38	91.00	1	0	
84	Daren Foster	England	1987	1989	27	13	8*	4.33	1,169	19	4/26	43.05	3	0	
85	Nick Pringle	England	1987	1991	12	97	22	10.77	30	0	–	–	4	0	
86	Harvey Trump	England	1988	1997	122	177	19	7.37	5,139	107	4/51	35.95	46	0	
87	Matthew Cleal	England	1988	1991	17	103	25	17.16	534	5	1/14	92.60	1	0	
88	Jimmy Cook	South Africa	1989	1991	71	3,048	177	45.49	0	–	–	–	27	0	
89	Chris Tavaré	England	1989	1993	109	3,465	162*	38.50	6	0	–	–	22	0	
90	Roland Lefebvre	Netherlands	1990	1992	49	377	37	17.13	2,276	58	7/15	28.46	13	0	
91	Ian Swallow	England	1990	1991	26	112	31	14.00	929	12	2/32	64.00	5	0	
92	Andy Hayhurst	England	1990	1996	121	2,678	95	33.06	2,984	94	5/60	26.08	17	0	
93	Jeremy Hallett	England	1990	1995	25	73	26	12.16	872	20	3/33	40.35	2	0	
94	Gareth Townsend	England	1990	1992	6	224	77	37.33	0	–	–	–	1	0	
95	Mark Lathwell	England	1990	2001	166	4,399	121	28.38	235	1	1/23	193.00	46	0	
96	Perry Rendell	England	1990	1990	1	–	–	–	66	2	2/46	23.00	2	0	
97	Andy Caddick	England	1990	2008	197	556	39	10.90	9,279	254	6/30	26.33	34	0	
98	David Graveney	England	1991	1991	14	23	14*	–	588	14	3/21	27.00	2	0	
99	David Beal	England	1991	1991	6	1	1	0.50	156	5	2/40	33.20	1	0	
100	Ken MacLeay	Australia	1991	1992	36	370	43	17.61	1,467	36	5/20	25.69	16	0	
101	Richard Snell	South Africa	1992	1992	19	237	62	26.33	845	18	3/47	35.22	2	0	
102	Andrew Payne	England	1992	1994	16	159	55*	14.45	540	10	4/37	45.00	2	0	
103	Andy Cottam	England	1992	1993	2	–	–	–	78	0	–	–	0	0	
104	Kevin Parsons	England	1992	1993	3	36	22	18.00	0	–	–	–	0	0	
105	Robert Turner †	England	1992	2005	226	3,358	70	26.23	0	–	–	–	228	33	
106	Nick Folland	England	1992	1994	35	988	107*	30.87	6	0	–	–	13	0	
107	Mushtaq Ahmed	Pakistan	1993	1998	82	564	41	13.11	3,864	97	7/24	25.40	9	0	
108	Andre van Troost	Netherlands	1993	1995	28	75	17*	10.71	1,183	33	5/22	29.96	2	0	
109	Jason Kerr	England	1993	2001	96	542	56	12.04	3,239	109	4/28	29.71	13	0	
110	Keith Parsons	England	1993	2007	247	5,225	121	29.68	6,333	146	5/39	36.23	98	0	
111	Marcus Trescothick	England	1993	2014	236	7,374	184	36.87	1,513	48	4/50	26.14	91	0	
112	Giles White	England	1993	1993	3	41	40	13.66	0	–	–	–	1	0	
113	Iain Fletcher	England	1993	1994	8	72	26	9.00	0	–	–	–	3	0	
114	Vince Clarke	England	1994	1994	7	74	26	10.57	104	2	1/15	50.00	2	0	
115	Piran Holloway †	England	1994	2002	97	2,402	117	30.40	0	–	–	–	20	1	
116	Paul Bird	England	1994	1994	5	4	4	4.00	168	3	1/18	43.00	2	0	
117	Mathew Dimond	England	1994	1996	4	–	–	–	78	0	–	–	0	0	
118	Simon Ecclestone	England	1994	1998	66	1,833	130	31.06	824	21	4/31	36.33	11	0	
119	Peter Bowler	England	1995	2004	159	4,431	104	29.34	129	2	1/24	71.50	48	0	
120	Jeremy Batty	England	1995	1996	8	42	19*	14.00	276	5	2/13	36.20	1	0	
121	Shane Lee	Australia	1996	1996	24	627	104	34.83	1,038	31	4/40	30.51	10	0	
122	Kevin Shine	England	1996	1997	11	42	38*	42.00	410	13	4/31	34.38	1	0	
123	Mike Burns †	England	1997	2005	179	4,325	115*	27.54	1,844	58	4/39	30.50	67	4	
124	Steven Herzberg	Australia	1997	1997	3	–	–	–	48	1	1/37	57.00	1	0	
125	Steffan Jones	Wales	1997	2008	138	478	42	12.91	6,285	197	5/23	28.47	22	0	
126	Ben Trott	England	1997	1997	1	–	–	–	24	1	1/29	29.00	0	0	
127	Adrian Pierson	England	1998	2000	17	79	31*	15.80	570	13	2/19	30.61	5	0	
128	Dermot Reeve	England	1998	1998	6	88	60	44.00	244	3	1/24	56.00	4	0	
129	Jamie Cox	Australia	1999	2004	110	3,598	131	34.26	138	4	3/28	28.75	41	0	
130	Matthew Bulbeck	England	1999	2002	30	117	24*	10.63	1,188	30	4/36	33.63	5	0	
131	Gregor Kennis	England	1999	2000	2	27	27	27.00	0	–	–	–	0	0	
132	Paul Jarvis	England	1999	2002	33	73	20*	8.11	1,463	46	5/55	29.06	7	0	
133	Ian Jones	England	1999	2001	2	5	5*	–	55	4	3/14	16.75	0	0	
134	Ian Blackwell	England	2000	2008	149	3,930	134*	30.94	5,342	114	5/26	38.53	39	0	
135	Peter Trego	England	2000	2019	176	4,666	147	34.30	5,146	144	5/44	33.33	49	0	
136	Jamie Grove	England	2000	2001	14	9	6	3.00	576	13	4/36	39.53	3	0	
137	Keith Dutch	England	2001	2004	89	1,451	93	22.32	3,141	74	6/40	34.70	44	0	
138	Richard Johnson	England	2001	2006	63	349	53	12.92	2,899	70	3/25	34.61	9	0	
139	Matthew Wood	England	2001	2007	73	1,892	129	29.10	0	–	–	–	12	0	
140	Simon Francis	England	2002	2006	55	210	33*	15.00	2,399	70	8/66	32.52	14	0	
141	Arul Suppiah	Malaysia	2002	2013	89	1,580	80	26.77	1,531	44	4/39	32.22	32	0	
142	Wes Durston	England	2002	2009	54	877	62*	30.24	726	17	3/44	44.88	15	0	
143	Michael Parsons	England	2002	2005	9	1	1*	0.33	363	5	2/60	72.40	3	0	
144	James Bryant	South Africa	2003	2003	9	120	56*	17.14	0	–	–	–	0	0	
145	Aaron Laraman	England	2003	2005	22	279	51	16.41	828	15	2/17	51.66	5	0	
146	Gareth Andrew	England	2003	2007	41	987	104	22.43	2,113	62	5/31	35.32	24	0	
147	Nixon McLean	West Indies	2003	2005	29	162	28	16.20	1,222	40	4/35	26.07	5	0	
148	Carl Gazzard †	England	2003	2009	53	938	157	24.05	0	–	–	–	12	0	
149	James Hildreth	England	2003	2022	222	6,096	159	35.64	114	5	2/26	28.20	80	0	
150	Gary Gilder	South Africa	2003	2003	3	9	8*	–	144	5	2/31	29.00	1	0	
151	John Francis	England	2004	2008	43	1,009	79	29.67	0	–	–	–	13	0	
152	Neil Hancock	England	2004	2004	1	12	12	12.00	48	1	1/48	48.00	0	0	
153	Thos Hunt	England	2004	2004	1	0	0	0.00	42	0	–	–	0	0	
154	Ricky Ponting	Australia	2004	2004	4	298	113	99.33	0	–	–	–	5	0	
155	Sanath Jayasuriya	Sri Lanka	2005	2005	9	218	101	24.22	236	5	1/18	47.20	4	0	
156	Graeme Smith	South Africa	2005	2005	5	326	108	81.50	0	–	–	–	3	0	
157	Charl Langeveldt	South Africa	2005	2005	7	9	5	4.50	336	7	2/33	46.14	0	0	
158	Robert Woodman	England	2005	2005	4	–	–	–	132	1	1/38	136.00	2	0	
159	Cameron White	Australia	2006	2007	24	834	109*	37.90	640	17	3/37	35.52	13	0	
160	Charl Willoughby	South Africa	2006	2010	61	59	15	6.55	2,864	72	6/43	30.26	6	0	
161	Dan Cullen	Australia	2006	2006	3	–	–	–	78	2	2/32	26.50	0	0	
162	Justin Langer	Australia	2006	2009	45	1,485	145	41.25	0	–	–	–	21	0	
163	Neil Edwards	England	2006	2006	5	113	65	22.60	0	–	–	–	1	0	
164	Sam Spurway †	England	2006	2006	4	31	31	15.50	0	–	–	–	4	2	
165	Craig Kieswetter †	England	2007	2013	79	2,815	138*	42.01	12	1	1/19	19.00	77	13	
166	Mark Turner	England	2007	2010	22	49	15*	12.25	802	31	4/36	26.45	5	0	
167	Neil McKenzie	South Africa	2007	2007	5	233	86	46.60	0	–	–	–	0	0	
168	Ben Phillips	England	2008	2010	33	144	51*	18.00	1,368	48	4/31	24.12	11	0	
169	Zander de Bruyn	South Africa	2008	2010	43	1,656	122*	53.41	1,028	38	4/20	25.39	11	0	
170	Alfonso Thomas	South Africa	2008	2014	71	289	49*	18.06	2,815	113	4/18	23.06	15	0	
171	Omari Banks	West Indies	2008	2009	18	97	28	13.85	522	11	3/40	46.36	2	0	
172	Max Waller	England	2009	2022	59	118	25*	16.85	1,819	45	3/37	37.97	32	0	
173	Jos Buttler †	England	2009	2013	47	1,444	94*	62.78	0	–	–	–	32	1	
174	Nick Compton	England	2010	2014	50	1,287	104	32.17	0	–	–	–	14	0	
175	Damien Wright	Australia	2010	2010	2	4	4*	–	90	6	3/43	18.16	0	0	
176	Murali Kartik	India	2010	2011	15	108	40	21.60	609	25	4/30	20.48	10	0	
177	Lewis Gregory	England	2010	2019	65	1,052	105*	25.04	2,431	89	4/23	27.91	23	0	
178	Gemaal Hussain	England	2011	2012	7	35	18*	–	260	7	2/29	40.85	2	0	
179	Ajantha Mendis	Sri Lanka	2011	2011	4	–	–	–	162	8	4/35	16.87	1	0	
180	Steve Kirby	England	2011	2013	27	0	0*	0.00	1,021	45	4/52	22.02	2	0	
181	Adam Dibble	England	2011	2013	7	15	15	15.00	288	11	4/52	26.81	1	0	
182	Craig Meschede	Germany	2011	2014	30	256	40*	18.28	957	37	4/5	24.27	7	0	
183	George Dockrell	Ireland	2011	2014	15	21	18	7.00	468	7	3/27	65.71	13	0	
184	Chris Jones	England	2011	2012	5	126	45*	42.00	0	–	–	–	0	0	
185	Steve Snell †	England	2011	2011	1	18	18*	–	0	–	–	–	2	0	
186	Jamie Overton	England	2012	2019	32	303	40*	17.82	1,223	45	4/42	29.82	14	0	
187	Alex Barrow †	England	2012	2016	26	388	72	25.86	0	–	–	–	24	1	
188	Craig Overton	England	2012	2019	46	560	66*	24.34	2,165	72	5/18	27.05	21	0	
189	Abdur Rehman	Pakistan	2012	2012	3	17	9	8.50	125	9	6/16	8.11	0	0	
190	Jack Leach	England	2012	2026	35	73	18	8.11	1,757	45	6/26	30.04	22	0	
191	Robert Mutch	South Africa	2012	2012	1	–	–	–	48	2	2/46	23.00	0	0	
192	Alviro Petersen	South Africa	2013	2013	7	191	63*	38.20	18	1	1/13	22.00	4	0	
193	Dean Elgar	South Africa	2013	2017	10	594	131*	74.25	85	4	2/35	22.50	6	0	
194	Piyush Chawla	India	2013	2013	2	4	3	2.00	48	1	1/43	43.00	1	0	
195	Colin Ingram	South Africa	2014	2014	7	298	72	42.57	0	–	–	–	2	0	
196	Tim Groenewald	South Africa	2014	2019	39	402	57	33.50	1,805	52	3/30	33.57	7	0	
197	Johann Myburgh	South Africa	2014	2018	21	605	81	33.61	108	1	1/20	102.00	5	0	
198	Adam Hose	England	2015	2017	20	593	101*	34.88	0	–	–	–	12	0	
199	Jim Allenby	Australia	2015	2017	26	939	144*	42.68	552	4	1/14	115.75	14	0	
200	Tom Cooper	Netherlands	2015	2015	8	359	104	59.33	30	0	–	–	1	0	
201	Michael Bates †	England	2015	2015	3	19	18*	–	0	–	–	–	2	0	
202	Tom Abell	England	2015	2019	25	636	106	31.80	36	2	2/19	13.00	7	0	
203	Josh Davey	Scotland	2015	2025	36	166	53	20.75	1,561	52	4/36	25.53	7	0	
204	Roelof van der Merwe	Netherlands	2016	2019	36	730	165*	33.18	1,443	42	3/21	33.14	28	0	
205	Mahela Jayawardene	Sri Lanka	2016	2016	5	240	117*	60.00	0	–	–	–	2	0	
206	Ryan Davies †	England	2016	2017	8	76	46	19.00	0	–	–	–	10	1	
207	Paul van Meekeren	Netherlands	2016	2018	6	22	10*	22.00	145	4	3/32	37.50	1	0	
208	Steven Davies †	England	2017	2022	27	500	94	19.23	0	–	–	–	29	1	
209	Tom Banton †	England	2018	2019	18	524	112	30.82	0	–	–	–	14	1	
210	Matt Renshaw	Australia	2018	2022	13	451	120	34.69	95	0	–	–	9	0	
211	Ben Green	England	2018	2025	25	457	157	45.70	1,077	36	4/52	27.58	9	0	
212	Dominic Bess	England	2018	2019	3	19	14	9.50	48	0	–	–	0	0	
213	Azhar Ali	Pakistan	2019	2019	11	451	110	41.00	114	7	5/34	19.42	8	0	
214	George Bartlett	England	2019	2023	31	732	108	30.50	0	–	–	–	14	0	
215	Sam Young	England	2021	2021	8	73	25	10.42	0	–	–	–	1	0	
216	Lewis Goldsworthy	England	2021	2026	48	1,901	115*	44.20	1,353	28	4/44	45.25	15	0	
217	Eddie Byrom	Zimbabwe	2021	2021	7	49	18	9.80	0	–	–	–	4	0	
218	Kasey Aldridge	England	2021	2025	29	113	24	9.41	1,195	42	6/33	29.33	16	0	
219	Jack Brooks	England	2021	2023	15	103	28	17.16	735	21	4/38	31.71	2	0	
220	Sonny Baker	England	2021	2022	11	12	7*	6.00	455	19	6/46	25.42	3	0	
221	George Drissell	England	2021	2021	5	32	17*	32.00	78	2	1/21	35.50	4	0	
222	Ned Leonard	England	2021	2024	15	73	32	18.25	635	13	3/40	52.69	6	0	
223	James Rew †	England	2021	2025	38	1,474	114	46.06	0	–	–	–	47	0	
224	Marchant de Lange	South Africa	2021	2021	3	26	20*	13.00	108	1	1/67	153.00	0	0	
225	George Thomas	England	2021	2024	19	493	106*	27.38	384	13	3/41	26.61	11	0	
226	Peter Siddle	Australia	2022	2022	2	43	29	21.50	72	1	1/41	74.00	0	0	
227	Alfie Ogborne	England	2022	2025	17	89	30*	22.25	783	22	5/41	32.68	7	0	
228	Andrew Umeed	Scotland	2022	2024	23	1,209	172*	57.57	60	4	3/31	9.25	7	0	
229	Ollie Sale	England	2022	2022	3	13	13	13.00	144	3	3/80	60.66	1	0	
230	Josh Thomas	England	2022	2026	33	663	97*	31.57	336	6	3/40	59.33	7	0	
231	Jack Harding	England	2022	2022	3	12	12	12.00	84	2	2/33	47.50	0	0	
232	George Scott	England	2022	2022	2	30	30	30.00	30	0	–	–	3	0	
233	Sean Dickson	South Africa	2023	2024	18	497	86	35.50	0	–	–	–	5	0	
234	Curtis Campher	Ireland	2023	2023	5	193	101	38.60	243	6	3/47	47.33	1	0	
235	Danny Lamb	England	2023	2023	8	98	41	24.50	343	8	3/25	46.62	3	0	
236	Shoaib Bashir	England	2023	2024	8	10	7	5.00	319	3	1/46	114.66	7	0	
237	JT Langridge	England	2023	2026	11	60	32	30.00	441	13	3/63	43.23	2	0	
238	Fin Hill	England	2023	2025	8	132	57	33.00	0	–	–	–	5	0	
239	Archie Vaughan	England	2024	2026	25	625	109*	32.89	558	15	3/41	31.93	14	0	
240	Joe Heywood	England	2024	2024	1	0	0*	–	6	0	–	–	0	0	
241	Charlie Cassell	Scotland	2024	2024	3	–	–	–	84	0	–	–	0	0	
242	Riley Meredith	Australia	2024	2024	3	–	–	–	150	6	4/27	21.33	0	0	
243	Tom Lammonby	England	2025	2026	18	937	114	52.05	443	16	5/20	26.25	8	0	
244	Thomas Rew	England	2025	2025	10	308	84*	44.00	0	–	–	–	6	0	
245	Migael Pretorius	South Africa	2025	2026	7	23	11	4.60	364	11	4/41	30.00	3	0	
246	Jake Ball	England	2025	2026	13	20	8	10.00	669	21	4/34	25.71	4	0	
247	Kian Roberts	England	2025	2026	6	111	32	22.40	138	3	2/53	48.33	2	0	
248	James Theedom	England	2025	2026	5	25	18	25.00	178	8	4/54	28.87	3	0	
249	Savin Perera	England	2026	2026	6	198	75	33.00	0	–	–	–	0	0	
250	Johnny Connell	England	2026	2026	8	119	33	14.87	0	–	–	–	4	0	
251	Ben Church †	England	2026	2026	8	105	24	21.00	0	–	–	–	10	2	
252	Josh Shaw	England	2026	2026	7	69	34	17.25	346	7	3/62	53.71	1	0	
253	Theo Lamey	England	2026	2026	3	28	14	9.33	0	–	–	–	0	0	

== See also ==
- Somerset County Cricket Club
- List of Somerset CCC players
- List of Somerset CCC players with 100 or more first-class or List A appearances
- List of Somerset CCC Twenty20 players
