= Cleal =

Cleal is a surname. Notable people with the surname include:

- Kane Cleal (born 1984), Australian rugby league footballer
- Matthew Cleal (born 1969), British cricketer
- Noel Cleal (born 1958), Australian rugby league footballer
- Ossie Cleal (1916–1977), New Zealand association football player
- Peter Cleal (1903–1979), Australian rules footballer
