= Andrew Payne =

Andrew Payne may refer to:

- Andrew Payne (cricketer)
- Andrew Payne (judoka)
- Jap Payne (Andrew H. Payne), baseball player in the Negro leagues
- Andy Payne, American ultramarathon runner
