= Alan Wilson (cricketer, born 1920) =

English cricketer

Personal information
- Full name: Alan Wilson
- Born: 24 April 1920; Newton-le-Willows, Lancashire, England
- Died: 6 April 2015 (aged 94); Warrington, Cheshire, England
- Batting: Right-handed
- Role: Wicket-keeper

Domestic team information
- Years: Team
- 1948–1962: Lancashire

Career statistics
Competition	First-class
Matches	171
Runs scored	760
Batting average	5.98
100s/50s	0/0
Top score	37*
Catches/stumpings	287/59
- Source: ESPNcricinfo, 24 April 2017

Alan Wilson (24 April 1920 – 6 April 2015) played first-class cricket for Lancashire as a tail-end batsman and wicketkeeper between 1948 and 1962. He was born at Newton-le-Willows, Lancashire, England.

Wilson played 171 first-class matches for Lancashire over 15 seasons, but was intermittently throughout his career superseded by other wicketkeepers who were generally better batsmen: Alfred Barlow in 1950, Frank Parr in 1953 and John Jordan in 1956. He was finally supplanted by Geoff Clayton in 1959 but returned for a single game in 1962 when he was granted a benefit to reward his loyalty.
