= Geoffrey Clayton =

Geoffrey Clayton may refer to:

- Geoff Clayton (1938–2018), Lancashire cricketer
- Geoffrey Clayton (bishop) (1884–1957), English Anglican archbishop

== See also ==
- Jeff Clayton (1954–2020), American musician
