= Paul Bird =

Paul Bird may refer to:

- Paul Bird (artist) (1923–1993), British artist
- Paul Bird (bishop) (born 1949), Australian bishop
- Paul Bird (cricketer) (born 1971), English cricketer
- Paul Bird (Paralympian) (born 1954), Australian Paralympic swimmer
- Paul Bird Motorsport, British motorcycle team
