= Charlie Carter (cricketer) =

English cricketer

Personal information
- Full name: Charles Edward Peers Carter
- Born: 7 August 1947 (age 79); Richmond-upon-Thames, Surrey, England
- Batting: Right-handed
- Role: Wicket-keeper

Domestic team information
- Years: Team
- 1968–1969: Somerset
- FC debut: 21 August 1968 Somerset v Leicestershire
- Last FC: 12 September 1969 Somerset v Kent
- LA debut: 27 April 1969 Somerset v Leicestershire
- Last LA: 17 August 1969 Somerset v Derbyshire

Career statistics
Competition	First-class	List A
Matches	26	6
Runs scored	73	11
Batting average	2.92	–
100s/50s	0/0	0/0
Top score	16	10*
Catches/stumpings	47/6	8/1
- Source: CricketArchive, 31 December 2009

Charles Edward Peers Carter (born 7 August 1947), played regular first-class cricket for Somerset for little more than a season in the late 1960s. He was born at Richmond-upon-Thames in Surrey in 1947.

A wicket-keeper and a tail-end right-handed batsman, Charlie Carter was educated at Radley College and was a successful schoolboy cricketer, appearing in the Marylebone Cricket Club (MCC)'s schools cricket festival for top performers in 1965. In 1967, he was playing services cricket for the Army and the Combined Services cricket teams, while also appearing in second eleven matches for Somerset.

Carter moved into Somerset's first team for the final two matches of the 1968 season following the decision of regular wicket-keeper Dickie Brooks not to continue a first-class cricket career. Though Carter scored only one run in his four innings that season, he was handed a contract for 1969 and played in all 24 County Championship matches in the 1969 season, though Trevor Holmes was picked for the other first-class fixture against the West Indians. In an unsuccessful season for Somerset – the county finished bottom of the Championship table for the first time since 1955 – Carter was singled out for praise in Wisden. He was, it said, "extremely enthusiastic" and had "developed into a most capable performer". He appeared less frequently in one-day cricket: the 1969 season was the first season of the new John Player League, a 40-over competition played on Sundays, but Carter played in only a few matches, Somerset generally preferring the more reliable batting of Roy Virgin, who could keep wicket adequately.

At the end of the season, Carter went into business and did not play first-class cricket again.
