= Steve Wilkinson (cricketer) =

English cricketer

Personal information
- Full name: Stephen George Wilkinson
- Born: 12 January 1949 (age 77); Hounslow, Middlesex, England
- Batting: Right-handed
- Bowling: Slow left arm orthodox
- Role: Batsman
- Relatives: Cousin, Phil Bainbridge

Domestic team information
- Years: Team
- 1971–1974: Somerset
- First-class debut: 24 May 1972 Somerset v Yorkshire
- Last First-class: 28 May 1974 Somerset v Gloucestershire
- List A debut: 16 May 1971 Somerset v Derbyshire
- Last List A: 19 May 1974 Somerset v Sussex

Career statistics
Competition	First-class	List A
Matches	18	25
Runs scored	452	327
Batting average	20.54	16.35
100s/50s	–/2	–/1
Top score	69	70
Balls bowled	12	–
Wickets	–	–
Bowling average	–	–
5 wickets in innings	–	–
10 wickets in match	–	–
Best bowling	0/9	–
Catches/stumpings	11/–	6/–
- Source: CricketArchive, 14 May 2011

Stephen George Wilkinson (born 12 January 1949) is a former cricketer who played first-class and List A cricket for Somerset between 1971 and 1974. He was born at Hounslow, then in Middlesex, now in London.

Wilkinson played as a right-handed opening or middle-order batsman. He appeared in second eleven matches for Middlesex in 1967 and then for Somerset in Minor Counties second eleven games in 1971. After one limited-overs appearance for the Somerset first team in 1971, he played nine first-class matches in 1972, batting mostly at No 3. He scored consistently but not prolifically, and passed 50 only twice in all of his 18 first-class matches, both times in his first season. In his second match, he made 69 against Surrey at The Oval, putting on 157 for the second wicket with Roy Virgin. In his next match he made 50 against Essex. But thereafter his highest first-class score was only 33. He was out of form in first-class cricket in 1973, though made his highest limited-overs score, 70, in the match against Gloucestershire at Somerset's ground in Bristol, the Imperial Athletic Ground, that year. He played only a handful of matches in 1974 and left the Somerset staff at the end of the season.

Wilkinson's batting style was upright, orthodox and technically correct – too correct for his captain, Brian Close: according to one report, Close told him "You play too straight lad", though that was after a straight drive from Wilkinson had got Close run out at the bowler's end.
