= Dickie Brooks =

English cricketer (born 1943)

Personal information
- Full name: Richard Alan Brooks
- Born: 14 June 1943 (age 83); Edgware, Middlesex, England
- Batting: Right-handed
- Role: Wicketkeeper

Domestic team information
- Years: Team
- 1967: Oxford University
- 1968: Somerset
- First-class debut: 13 May 1967 Oxford University v Indians
- Last First-class: 2 September 1968 Somerset v Gloucestershire

Career statistics
Competition	First-class
Matches	35
Runs scored	317
Batting average	10.93
100s/50s	0/0
Top score	44
Catches/stumpings	53/7
- Source: CricketArchive, 15 September 2013

Richard Alan Brooks (born 14 June 1943), known as Dickie Brooks is an English former cricketer who played first-class cricket for Oxford University and Somerset.

Brooks was educated at Quintin School in St John's Wood and St Edmund Hall, Oxford. A lower-order right-handed batsman and wicketkeeper, he won a Blue for cricket in 1967, and was then offered a contract with Somerset, the county having just parted company with its regular wicketkeeper Geoff Clayton. Brooks kept wicket tidily for Somerset for the whole of the 1968 season, but at the end of it he was offered a teaching post at Bradfield College and gave up the first-class game.
