= Cricket helmet =

Sportswear

Helmets in cricket were developed in the 20th century.

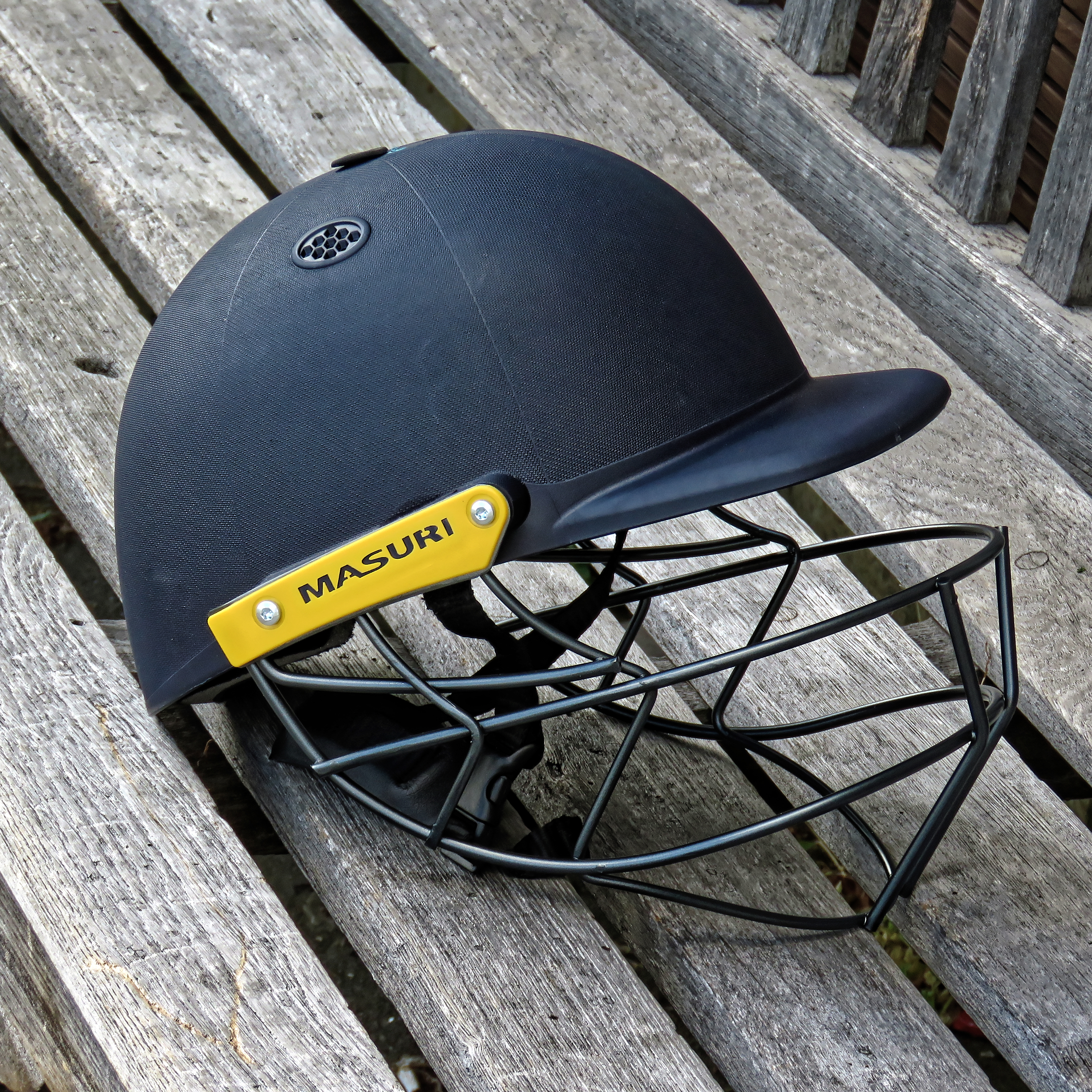
The Masuri Group Original Series MKII cricket helmet

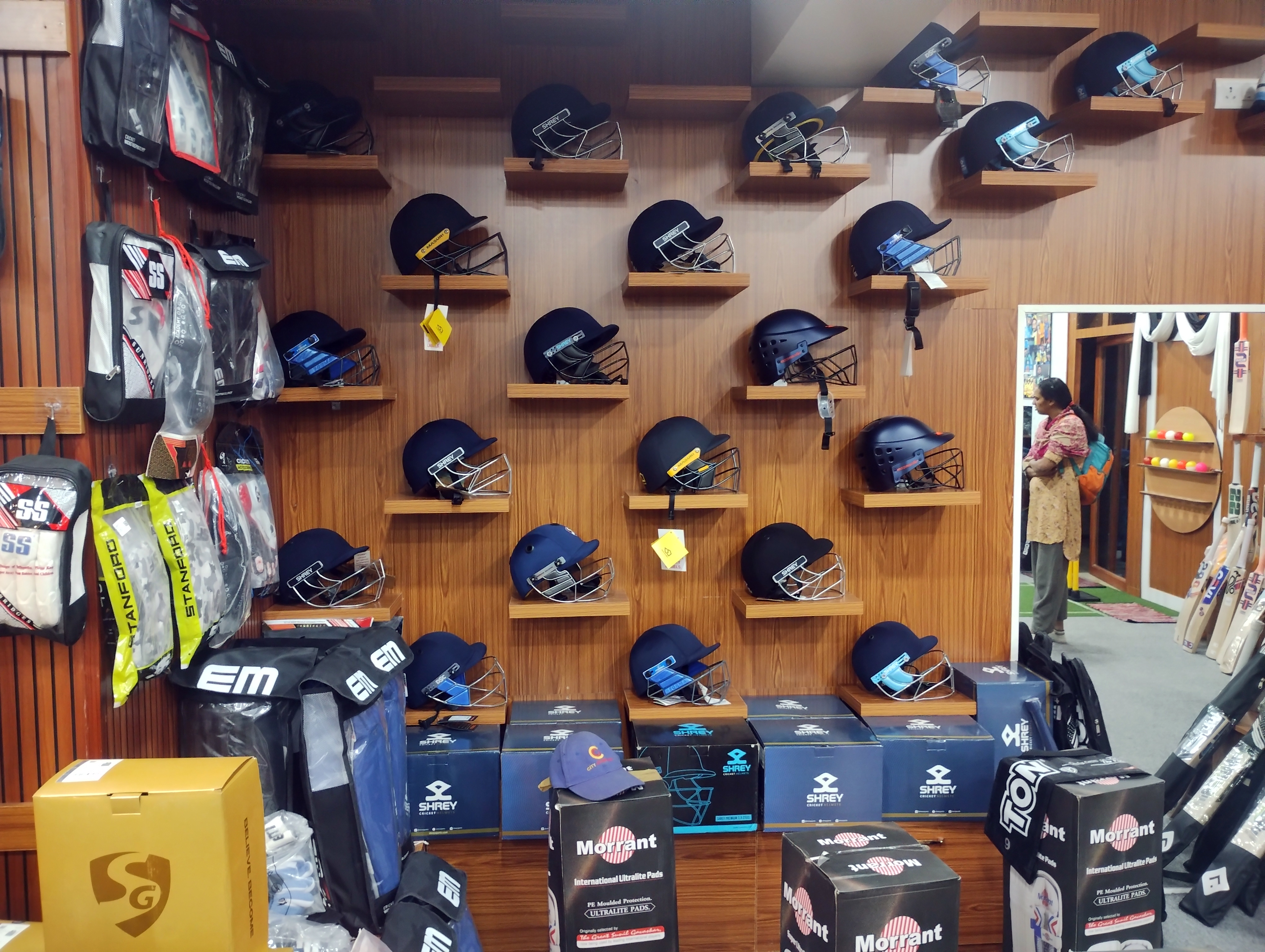
Cricket helmets in a store in Bangalore (2026)

== History ==
There are recorded instances of cricketers using scarves and padded caps to protect themselves throughout cricket history. Patsy Hendren was one of the first to use a self-designed protective hat in the 1930s. Helmets were not in common use until the 1970s. The first helmets were seen in World Series Cricket, with Dennis Amiss being the first player to consistently wear a helmet which was a customised motorcycle helmet.

Mike Brearley was another player who wore his own design. Tony Greig was of the opinion that they would make cricket more dangerous by encouraging bowlers to bounce the batsmen. Graham Yallop of Australia was the first to wear a protective helmet to a test match on 17 March 1978, when playing against West Indies at Bridgetown. Later Dennis Amiss of England popularised it in Test cricket. Helmets began to be widely worn thereafter.

The last batsmen at the highest (Test match) level to never wear a helmet throughout his career was Viv Richards, who retired from the international game in 1991. A number of career ending injuries including to Craig Spearman and Craig Kieswetter and research from the England and Wales Cricket Board led to the current improvements seen in modern day helmets.

== Modern day cricket helmets ==
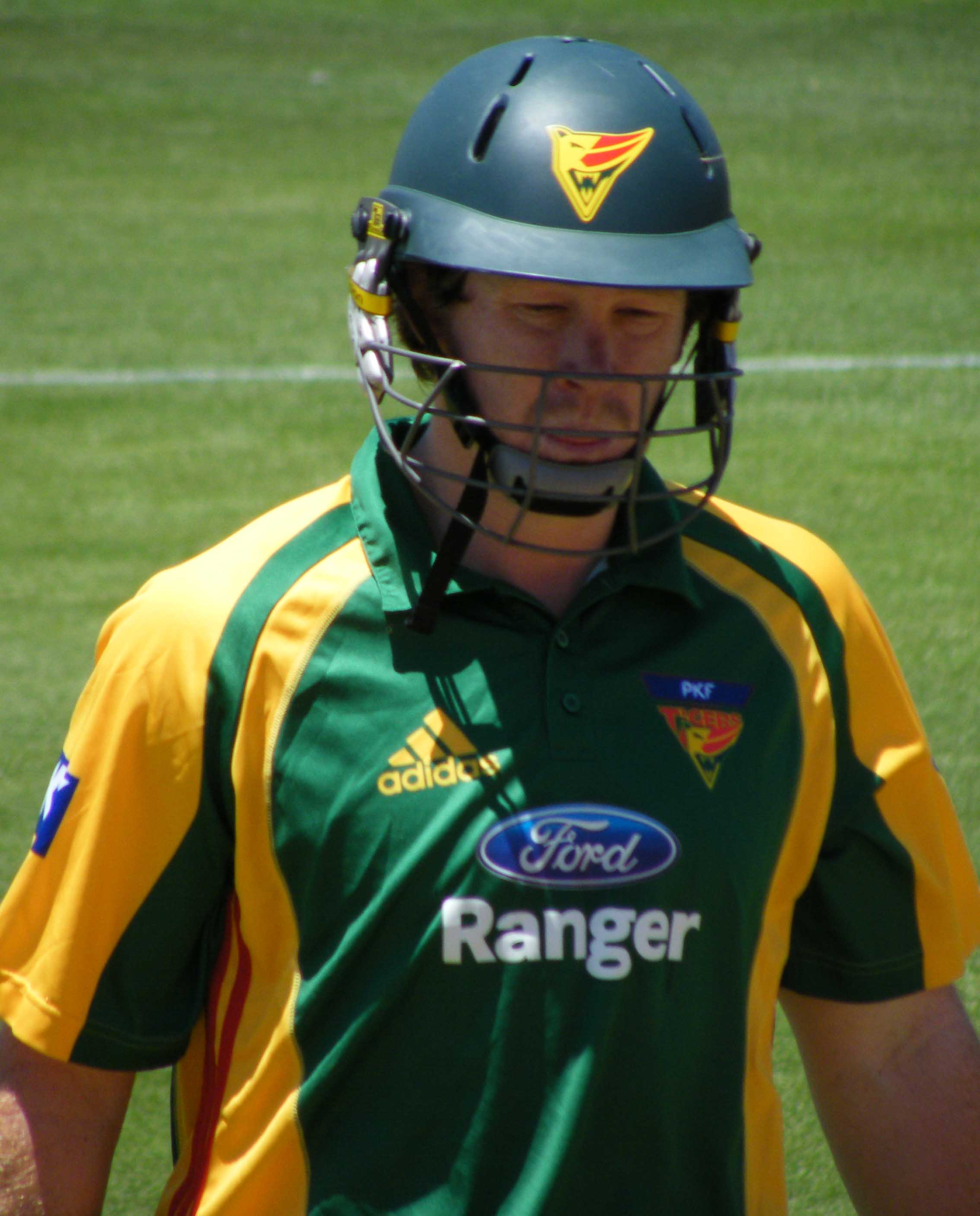
Dane Anderson of the Tasmanian Tigers wearing a helmet

Modern day cricket helmets are made in compliance with the recent safety standards of the International Cricket Council (ICC) and have to conform to the British Standard BS7928:2013.

Materials used for making cricket helmets are impact resistance materials like ABS Plastic, Fibreglass, carbon fibre, titanium, steel and high density foam etc. Main parts of a cricket helmets are grill (made with steel, titanium or carbon fibre), chin strap, inner foam material, outer impact resistant shell etc.

In 2019 new standards for helmets were published British Standards BS7928:2013+A1:2019 This provided the introduction of standards for neck protectors to be worn as part of the head protector. The development, testing, manufacturer and accredited standard was brought in expediently as an additional safety feature, following the death of Australian batsman Phillip Hughes. Neck protectors are worn as an attachment to modern helmets and grilles and cover a vulnerable area at the base of the skull. As of October 2022, England and Wales Cricket Board mandated the use of the additional neck protectors in all instance of batting and close fielding. In October 2023, Cricket Australia also mandated the use of neck protectors but only when batting against fast or medium-paced bowling.

== Legislation ==
As of 2023, the ICC has made wearing Of Helmets a must For High-Risk Positions which are: (a) batting against fast or medium paced bowling; (b) wicket-keeping up to the stumps; and (c) fielding in a position closer than seven metres from the batter’s position on the popping crease on a middle stump line (such as short leg or silly point), with the exception of any fielding position behind square of the wicket on the off side.

In all cricket, as of 2016, England requires all batsmen, wicketkeepers and fielders closer than 8 yards from the wicket to wear helmets. This is mandatory even when facing medium-pace and spin bowling. New Zealand and India do not require batsmen to wear helmets. Australia requires helmets to be worn by batters if facing fast or medium-paced bowling; wicketkeepers if keeping up to the stumps; and all fielders in positions within 7 metres of the batter, with the exception of any fielding position behind square of the wicket on the off side.

== Opposition from players ==
Many players refused to wear helmets, either believing that they obstructed their vision when batting, or, just as in the similar debate in ice hockey, feeling helmets were unmanly, a view held by many spectators. Englishman Dennis Amiss was the first player to wear a helmet in the modern game, during a World Series Cricket match, for which both the crowd and other players mocked him. Australian captain Graham Yallop was booed when he wore one in a 1978 match against the West Indies (the first time a helmet was worn in a test match) and West Indian captain Viv Richards viewed such protection as cowardly. India captain Sunil Gavaskar believed that helmets slowed down a batsman's reflexes and refused to wear one. In more recent times, many batsmen have felt that modern helmet designs have become increasingly obstructive. Most notably, England captain Alastair Cook for a time refused to wear a new helmet complying with ICC safety regulations since he felt it was distracting and uncomfortable. His England teammate Jonathan Trott also refused for similar reasons, and teammate Nick Compton (a close friend of Phillip Hughes) felt that the new regulations were overzealous.

== See also ==
- Batting helmet (baseball and softball)
