= Craig Kieswetter =

English cricketer (born 1987)

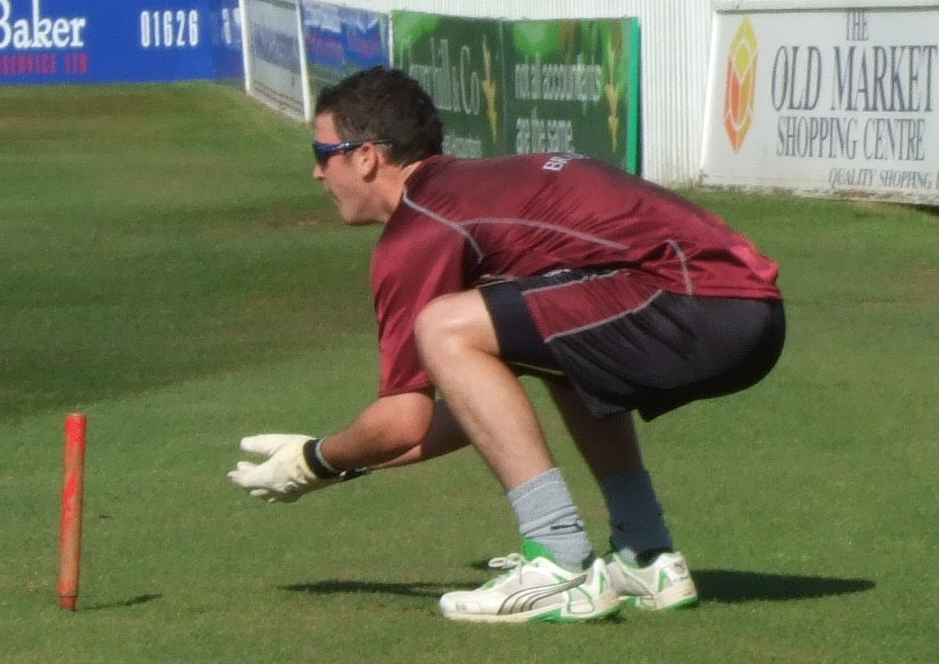

Personal information
- Full name: Craig Kieswetter
- Born: 28 November 1987 (age 38); Johannesburg, Transvaal Province, South Africa
- Nickname: Hobnob
- Batting: Right-handed
- Bowling: Right-arm off break
- Role: Opening batter; wicket-keeper

International information
- National side: England (2010–2013)
- ODI debut (cap 214): 28 February 2010 v Bangladesh
- Last ODI: 19 January 2013 v India
- T20I debut (cap 49): 5 May 2010 v West Indies
- Last T20I: 29 September 2012 v New Zealand

Domestic team information
- Years: Team
- 2007–2015: Somerset (squad no. 22)
- 2013/14: Brisbane Heat (squad no. 22)
- 2014: Warriors

Career statistics
| Competition | ODI | T20I | FC | LA |
|---|---|---|---|---|
| Matches | 46 | 25 | 115 | 134 |
| Runs scored | 1,054 | 526 | 5,728 | 4,254 |
| Batting average | 30.11 | 21.91 | 39.23 | 39.38 |
| 100s/50s | 1/5 | 0/3 | 11/31 | 11/17 |
| Top score | 107 | 63 | 164 | 143 |
| Balls bowled | – | – | 54 | 12 |
| Wickets | – | – | 2 | 1 |
| Bowling average | – | – | 14.50 | 19.00 |
| 5 wickets in innings | – | – | 0 | 0 |
| 10 wickets in match | – | – | 0 | 0 |
| Best bowling | – | – | 2/3 | 1/19 |
| Catches/stumpings | 53/12 | 17/3 | 331/12 | 136/26 |
- Source: ESPNcricinfo, 26 September 2014

Craig Kieswetter (born 28 November 1987) is an English professional golfer and former cricketer who appeared in 71 matches for the England cricket team between 2010 and 2013. Born and raised in South Africa, Kieswetter moved to England to complete his education, and began playing county cricket for Somerset in 2007. Three years later, he made his international debut in a One Day International (ODI) against Bangladesh. A wicket-keeper batsman, he was considered a one-day specialist, and all his international appearances came in ODIs or Twenty20 Internationals.

Kieswetter played junior cricket for Western Province until the age of 18, but lack of opportunity led him to seek an alternative route in England. He studied at Millfield, where he was noticed by Somerset. The county's lack of a strong wicket-keeper gave Kieswetter his opportunity, and he made his debut for the team early in the 2007 season. Through his Scottish mother, he qualified to play county cricket, and his performances soon generated discussion about his potential to play for England. Around this time, the captain of South Africa, Graeme Smith, invited him to return to play in South Africa but Kieswetter preferred to qualify for England.

In early 2010, Kieswetter achieved his target; some strong performances for the England Lions, especially in a match against the senior England team, won him a place in the squad to face Bangladesh. His selection, along with the presence of other South African-born players in the England team, was criticised; some commentators suggested there should be fewer foreign-born players in the team. Kieswetter scored his only international century in his third match, and a couple of months later he was the man of the match in the final when England won the 2010 ICC World Twenty20. After a promising start for England, he was dropped owing to his inconsistency before the end of 2010. He returned to the team the following year, but his place was insecure, and in 2013 he was replaced by Jos Buttler, his teammate at Somerset.

Kieswetter's career was cut short by an injury sustained while batting for Somerset in July 2014: a ball penetrated the gap between his helmet's grille and visor and struck him in the face, damaging his vision. There was some hope of a full recovery and he was named in a provisional England squad for the 2015 Cricket World Cup, but he continued to experience difficulties with his vision and he announced his retirement from professional cricket in June 2015, aged 27. In 2017, he became a professional golfer.

== Early life and career ==
Kieswetter was born in Johannesburg to an Afrikaner father, Wayne, and Scottish mother, Belinda. He studied at Diocesan College in Cape Town, and played cricket for Western Province junior teams between the ages of 13 and 18. Kieswetter was disappointed when he was asked to play club cricket for two or three seasons before returning to play for the senior team; he never received an explanation and decided instead to pursue a cricket career in England, where he moved at the age of 18. He studied for his A-levels for a year at Millfield, where Mark Davis, a former Somerset bowler, spotted him. He was quickly signed by Somerset. At the 2006 Under-19s World Cup in Sri Lanka, he represented South Africa and won a Man of the Match award in a game against the United States for his innings of 80 off 66 balls.

Kieswetter made his first appearance for Somerset's second team in May 2006, taking over from Sam Spurway as wicket-keeper midway through a match when the latter was injured. He scored 94 not out in his first innings of that match against Glamorgan, and by the end of the season he had scored 245 runs at an average of over 40. His performances were so strong that Somerset chose to release Spurway at the start of the 2007 season, and named Kieswetter alongside Carl Gazzard as their two wicket-keepers. In early April that year, he made his one-day debut for Somerset against Glamorgan; he made 69 not out off 58 balls and took a catch described as "world class" by Somerset's director of cricket, Brian Rose. He made his first-class debut the following month, keeping wicket while Derbyshire made 801 for 8 declared (Note: "801 for 8" is cricket notation which could also be written 801/8, and signifies that the batting team has scored 801 runs, and has lost eight of its ten wickets. See Scoring (cricket) for more information.) and scored 63 in the Somerset reply.

Kieswetter continued to perform well during 2007 and 2008, and was awarded the NBC Denis Compton Award, as the "most promising young player", for Somerset in both seasons, scoring several fifties in first-class and one-day cricket. Against Glamorgan, he scored 93 while batting at number eight. Kieswetter came in after two wickets had been lost in an over, with the score at 250 for 6. His innings, which included a partnership of 130 with Andy Caddick, helped Somerset to reach 402 and eventually win the match. Towards the end of the 2008 season, during a 40-over match against Gloucestershire, Kieswetter scored his first century for Somerset, scoring 121 runs from 107 balls, and sharing a competition-record 302-run partnership with Marcus Trescothick.

In 2009, Kieswetter passed 1,000 first-class runs in a season for the only time during his career. Early in the year, he scored an unbeaten 150 in a high-scoring draw against Warwickshire, his maiden first-class century. A few weeks later, he scored 106 runs against Durham to help his county avoid defeat. In his report for Cricinfo, Andrew McGlashan described Kieswetter as "another likely South African to make the transition to England colours". Kieswetter scored two further first-class centuries during the year, both at Taunton, against Sussex and Lancashire; he averaged just under 60 for his 1,242 first-class runs in the season. In one-day cricket, Kieswetter opened the batting alongside Trescothick, and averaged 65.83, scoring an unbeaten 138 off 131 balls against Warwickshire. In the quarter-final of the 2009 Friends Provident Trophy, Kieswetter scored his second one-day century of the season, but Somerset were defeated by six wickets. His 248 runs in the 2009 Twenty20 Cup helped Somerset reach the final of that competition, where they were again beaten by Sussex. He was awarded his county cap during the final game of the 2009 County Championship against Worcestershire.

== International cricketer ==
=== International selection ===
Following his strong performances for Somerset, Kieswetter was part of the England Performance Programme squad that spent eight weeks of the English winter training in Loughborough and Pretoria. The South African national cricket captain, Graeme Smith, said he wanted Kieswetter to return to play cricket in South Africa; rather than directly inviting him to play for the South Africa national cricket team, he stated that "the challenge is to get him back into our franchise system first, but he is certainly someone we have seen and would like to get back into the system". Kieswetter repeated his desire to play international cricket for England.

In 2010, Kieswetter qualified to play for England on the basis of having a British passport, via his Scottish mother, and his residency in England. Under the rules for international cricket, he had to wait until four years after his last appearance for South Africa, which was on 16 February 2006 during the Under-19s World Cup. In January 2010, he was named as part of the England Lions squad to tour the United Arab Emirates for a series against Pakistan A. The England head coach, Andy Flower, described Kieswetter's performances during that tour as "a really good start", and described the Twenty20 warm-up match between the England Lions and the England senior team that followed the tour as "a chance for him to impress". During that match, which was played on the day that he qualified for England, Kieswetter scored 81 runs to help the Lions beat the senior team.

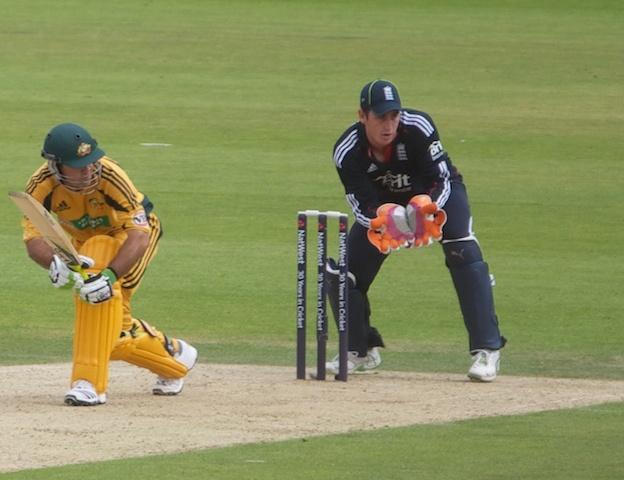
Kieswetter keeping wicket in an ODI against Australia at the Oval in 2010

After England's drawn T20I series with Pakistan in mid-February 2010, Kieswetter was added to the senior England squad for the ODI series against Bangladesh. He was immediately included in the team, playing as a specialist batsman alongside wicket-keeper Matt Prior, in the first warm-up match on 23 February against the Bangladesh Cricket Board XI. He scored 143, his career-best one-day score, from 123 balls. That score, and his performances for the England Lions, led to Kieswetter's selection for the first ODI against Bangladesh on 28 February. Opening the innings alongside captain Alastair Cook, Kieswetter struggled in his first over; he made 19 runs in an innings described by ESPNcricinfo's Andrew Miller as "tinged with nerves" and "chancy". In the next match, two days later, Kieswetter misplayed his first ball and was nearly dismissed; he was then caught off a similar mishit from the next ball bowled. In the third match, he scored his first international century – 107 runs – which helped England to 284 for five and a 45-run victory. England won the series 3–0. In contrast to the "hard-hitting batting" which Geoff Miller, the England selector, had cited as one of the reasons for his inclusion, Kieswetter's century was patiently built after a nervous start.

When the England squad was announced for the 2010 ICC World Twenty20, Kieswetter was named as the only wicket-keeper in the squad, replacing Prior. Kieswetter opened the innings with Michael Lumb throughout the tournament, and ESPNcricinfo's Andrew McGlashan identified their performances as one of the reasons that England reached the final. During the final, Kieswetter was England's top-scorer, hitting 63 runs from 49 balls, and was named as the man of the match as England won their first ICC global title. During the tournament, Kieswetter scored 222 runs, the fourth-most of any player, at an average of 31.71 and a strike rate of 116.84.

=== Dropped and recalled by England ===
After returning to England, Kieswetter's form dipped, and he scored 121 runs from eight ODIs against Australia and Bangladesh. As a result, when England played five ODIs against Pakistan in September, Kieswetter was omitted and Worcestershire's Steven Davies was preferred, although Kieswetter was included in the T20I squad. Kieswetter opened the innings alongside Davies, who was playing as wicket-keeper, in the two T20Is, but made scores of only six and sixteen. Although named in the T20I squad for the tour of Australia, he was not selected to play, and instead took part in the England Performance Programme XI tour, before joining up with the England Lions to take part in the Regional Four Day Competition in the West Indies. During the competition, Kieswetter scored two centuries, against the Leeward Islands and the Combined Campuses and Colleges.

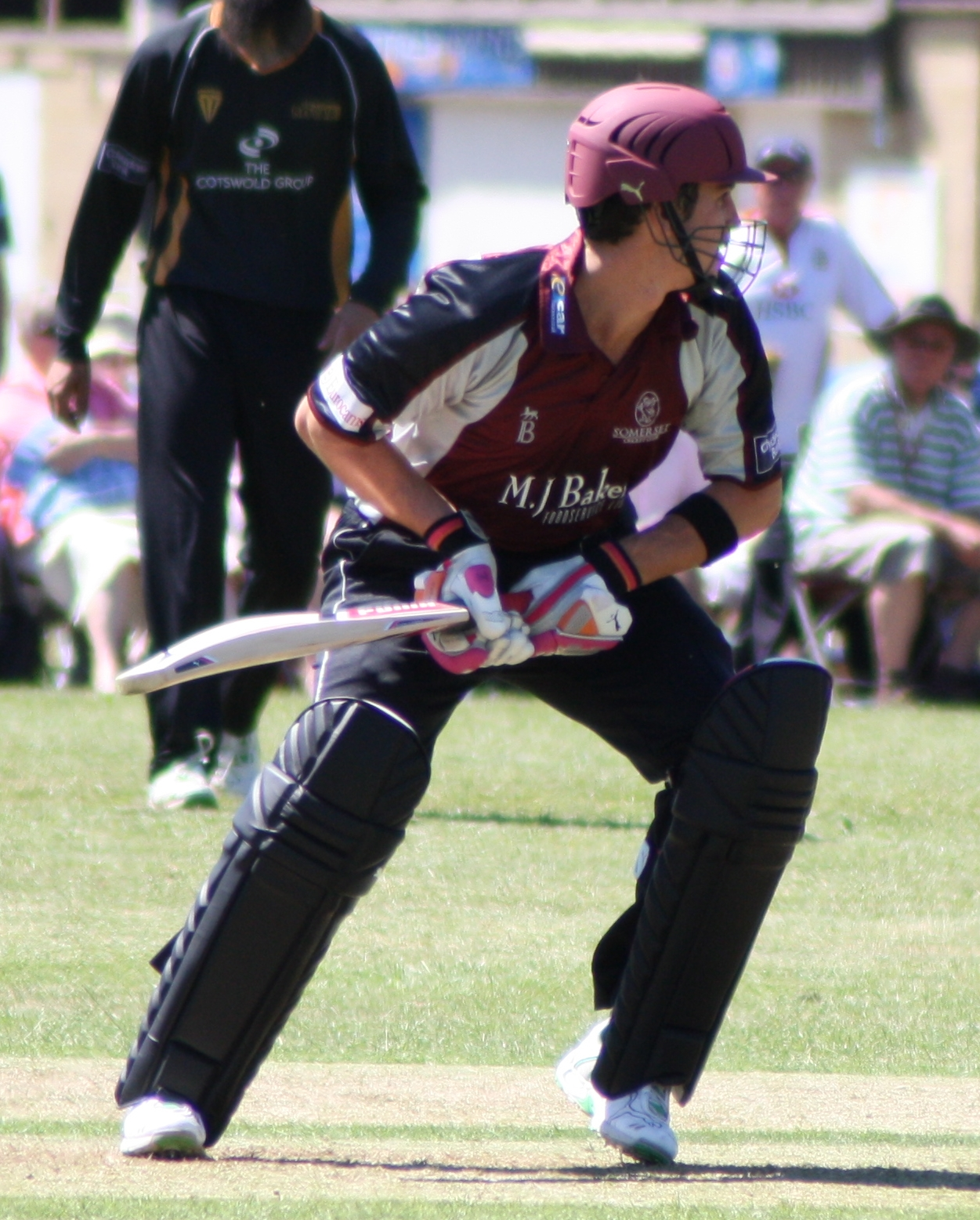
Kieswetter batting against Worcestershire in 2010

Kieswetter began the 2011 season strongly for Somerset, scoring 308 runs in his first four one-day matches, including two centuries. Another century, in the County Championship prompted Jeremy James of ESPNcricinfo to ask "whether Craig Kieswetter will regain his place in England's one-day side before Jos Buttler assumes it ahead of him". His form earned him a recall to England's one-day squads for the series against Sri Lanka, Geoff Miller saying "[Kieswetter] will offer some real fire power with the bat along with his ability with the gloves". In his first match back for England, the Twenty20 match, Kieswetter scored only four runs, but he was England's top-scorer in the first ODI match, with 61 runs. He struck another half-century in the fourth match of the series: he scored 72 not out as England won by ten wickets. A week later, playing for Somerset against Nottinghamshire, he scored 164 runs, the highest innings of his first-class career, as part of a 290-run partnership with James Hildreth.

Kieswetter remained England wicket-keeper for the T20I and ODI matches against India late in the season. In the T20I, Buttler, his fellow Somerset wicket-keeper, made his debut, albeit as a specialist batsman; Jonny Bairstow, the Yorkshire wicket-keeper, made his debut in the final ODI in a similar role. In that series, Kieswetter struggled against the moving ball in English conditions (Note: Typically, it is considered that the ball will move laterally both through the air and in bouncing off the pitch more in England than many other places.) but was praised for his attacking batting, including 46 runs from 25 balls in the second match. Based on the number of appearances that he made for England, Kieswetter was awarded an incremental contract by the England and Wales Cricket Board (ECB) in September 2011. (Note: The England and Wales Cricket Board (ECB) award three types of contracts to international players: a central contract means that the ECB pay the player's wage, an incremental contract means that the player's county side pay the player's wage, with the ECB paying additional salary, and a tour contract means that the player is paid by appearance or tour.) During England's subsequent 5–0 ODI series loss in India, described by the Wisden Cricketers' Almanack's Stephen Brenkley as "a tour too far for England", Kieswetter was the only England batsman to maintain a strike rate above 100. He scored one half-century during the tour, and was included in the England Lions squad that toured Sri Lanka three months later.

=== End of international career ===
Playing for the Lions, Kieswetter moved into the middle-order, rather than opening the batting; this was intended to prepare him for a similar switch with the senior England team to allow Kevin Pietersen to open. He scored a century and a half-century to help England win the series 3–2, though he was outperformed by Buttler. In early 2012, playing against Pakistan in the United Arab Emirates, Kieswetter batted only twice in the ODI series, and was praised for his 43-run contribution in the fourth match, though George Dobell of ESPNcricinfo identified his wicket-keeping as "still not as polished as he would like". Although Kieswetter dropped down the order in ODIs, he retained his place opening the batting in T20Is. In contrast to the 2010 World Twenty20, when the England players were told to attack bat selflessly, in 2012 the team was instructed to avoid losing early wickets, and Kieswetter struggled to adapt his game to score low-risk singles and rotate the strike. During the 2012 ICC World Twenty20, he lost his place in England's T20I team after a match against New Zealand in which he scored four runs from fourteen balls. That was his final international Twenty20 match. In his 25 games, he scored 526 runs at an average of 21.91 and a strike rate of 111.91.

Despite his struggles in international cricket, Kieswetter had a successful season with Somerset in 2012; he scored 848 first-class runs at an average of just over 60, including a century against Warwickshire and one for the Lions against Australia A. The following year, he retained his place in the ODI team for the tour of India, although ESPNcricinfo's Alex Winter suggested that it might be due to "England's desire to protect the workload of their players ahead of back-to-back Ashes series." Winter's colleague, Dobell, described the England ODI wicket-keeper position as one of England's key areas requiring resolution, citing both Bairstow and Buttler as candidates to take over, as well as the possibility of Matt Prior, the England Test wicket-keeper, reclaiming the role. Kieswetter played the first three ODIs of the series, scoring 24 not out, 18 and 0 before he was dropped and replaced by Buttler. Dobell described Kieswetter as "perhaps ... a little unfortunate", but cited his inability to adjust his game and the number of balls he blocked as the reasons for his removal. He played 46 ODIs, scoring 1,054 runs at an average of 30.11.

== Later domestic career ==
The competition between Kieswetter and Buttler for England's one-day wicket-keeping role also caused conflict at Somerset for the 2013 season: both players wanted to fulfil the role for the county. Kieswetter began the season as the wicket-keeper in the County Championship, but broke his thumb during the third match of the season, which kept him out of action for six weeks. Kieswetter had a particularly strong Twenty20 season, finishing as the leading run-scorer in the 2013 Friends Life t20 with 517 runs, including five half-centuries. His teammate, Peter Trego, praised Kieswetter's ability to build big innings in Twenty20 cricket, and Kieswetter himself said that he "tried to be a bit more of a responsible player, rather than just power blazing." He scored a late-season century against Warwickshire in the County Championship, but in a season in which Somerset struggled against relegation, he scored a relatively modest 606 first-class runs at an average of 31.89. At the end of the season, Buttler, whose contract with Somerset had expired, announced that he was joining Lancashire, leaving Kieswetter as the clear first-choice wicket-keeper at Somerset.

Kieswetter signed with the Brisbane Heat for the 2013–14 Big Bash League. During the tournament, he scored 192 runs from eight matches including two half-centuries. He entered the 2014 Indian Premier League auction, but remained unsold. He was called up as a late replacement for the injured Luke Wright for England's squad in the 2014 ICC World Twenty20, but was not selected to play. He began the 2014 season positively for Somerset, particularly in the Twenty20 competition, in which he scored six half-centuries in ten innings, averaging just under 50.

== Injury and retirement from cricket ==
On 12 July 2014, Kieswetter suffered a broken nose and fractured cheek bone while batting for Somerset against Northamptonshire in a County Championship match. The bowler, David Willey, delivered a bouncer which went through the gap between the grille and the peak of Kieswetter's helmet and struck him in the face. The injuries were initially described by Somerset's chairman, Andy Nash, as "serious but non-career threatening". He underwent facial surgery, and suffered from double vision for a while after. He returned to the Somerset side before the end of the 2014 season and scored a half-century in his first match back, against Middlesex, though he admitted that his vision was still not fully recovered. Kieswetter signed for the South African franchise Warriors as their overseas player to play in the Ram Slam T20 Challenge for the 2014–15 season. He played all ten matches for the Warriors, scoring 199 runs at an average of 22.11, including two half-centuries.

On 10 December 2014, despite having been named in England's 30-man provisional 2015 Cricket World Cup squad, Kieswetter revealed that he was still suffering vision problems. He announced that he would not play in the 2015 season and would seek further treatment. The following June, he announced his retirement from professional cricket, saying that, although he was still capable of playing, he could not play to the standard he wanted: "In the end I just thought, there are too many mediocre players in county cricket – and good luck to them – but I don't want to be another one." He found batting in floodlit conditions particularly difficult, and described the vision in his right eye as being "only at 80 or 85 percent". He finished his career with similar statistics in first-class and one-day cricket; in both he averaged just under 40 and had scored eleven centuries. In Twenty20 cricket, his highest score was 89 not out, and he averaged just over 30. In an interview with ESPNcricinfo shortly after his retirement, Kieswetter said that he would be interested in working in the media, perhaps as part of a commentary team for Twenty20 matches.

Although rare, the injury to Kieswetter was followed by another high-profile case, when Phillip Hughes died after being struck on the head by a cricket ball while batting. These incidents led the ECB to make the wearing of helmets mandatory for professional cricketers in England from the start of the 2016 season, and banned them from wearing helmets with adjustable grilles, specifying that the gap between the grille and the helmet's peak should be no more than 50 millimetres (2.0 in).

== Playing style ==
Kieswetter's confident and attacking batting style was compared to that of Kevin Pietersen, another England batsman of South African origin. Although Kieswetter favoured the off-side, he was also strong behind square on both sides, and stood with a typical South African stance, his bat held high. He played with what Wisden described as an "attractive, uncomplicated front-foot technique". (Note: A "front-foot" technique is one in which a cricketer plays the majority of their shots with their weight forward, over the front foot.) He began his career playing in front of his stumps, but once bowlers had worked out his technique, he moved his batting stance to outside the leg stump to give himself more space to drive the ball. This move had some success on flat subcontinental pitches, but was less effective in England, where the ball tended to change direction more. Kieswetter admitted that the change had not worked, saying that "I wasn’t really moving my feet. I was staying leg-side and playing with my hands. My technique just wasn’t strong enough to cope." After being dropped by England, Kieswetter worked on his batting, which had been described by Steve James as a "frenzy at the crease, as manic as a teenager on a night out". He moved back in front of his stumps, and maintained a calmer mentality, aiming to construct an innings.

He was generally more highly regarded for his batting than his wicket-keeping, often drawing criticism for the quality of his glovework. Despite this, he was at times considered to be a better wicket-keeper than two of his rivals for England; Bairstow and Buttler. Nonetheless, playing in an era when international teams did not play specialist wicket-keepers, Kieswetter's selection was based primarily upon his batting ability, rather than his keeping ability. For a couple of matches during 2012, he was used as an off spin bowler by Somerset, collecting three wickets.

Somerset experimented with Kieswetter throughout the order, trying to find the most effective place for him. He began as a middle-order batsman, but by the end of the 2007 season, although he remained in the middle-order in first-class cricket, Kieswetter regularly found himself opening the batting alongside Marcus Trescothick in one-day cricket, a role he would also take up in opening six matches of the 2009 Twenty20 Cup, although he later dropped back into the middle order to improve the balance of the side. On his international call-up, England chose to use Kieswetter as an opening batsman. He was selected "because of his proven ability to pierce the field in the Powerplay overs, particularly with his booming drives up and over the covers." He later moved down the order for England to accommodate Kevin Pietersen as opener.

== Golf career ==
After Kieswetter's retirement from cricket, his father suggested that he take a break and play some golf. He had done so during his youth in South Africa, playing in provincial tournaments. After some lessons with David Leadbetter, who suggested that he should try to become a professional golfer, Kieswetter began to enter amateur tournaments. After performing well in those events, he set himself a target of becoming a professional, and playing regularly on the European Tour. In late 2016, he took part in a couple of PGA EuroPro Tour tournaments and one on the MENA Golf Tour. In early 2017, he turned professional and in March played in the MENA Golf Tour qualifying school in Morocco, finishing tied for 31st place and earning a card for the 2017 season. He played regularly on the Tour during 2017 and in September won his biggest prize of the season, winning US$360 in the Dubai Creek Open after finishing tied for 38th place.
