= 2010 World Twenty20 final =

2010 ICC World Twenty20 Final
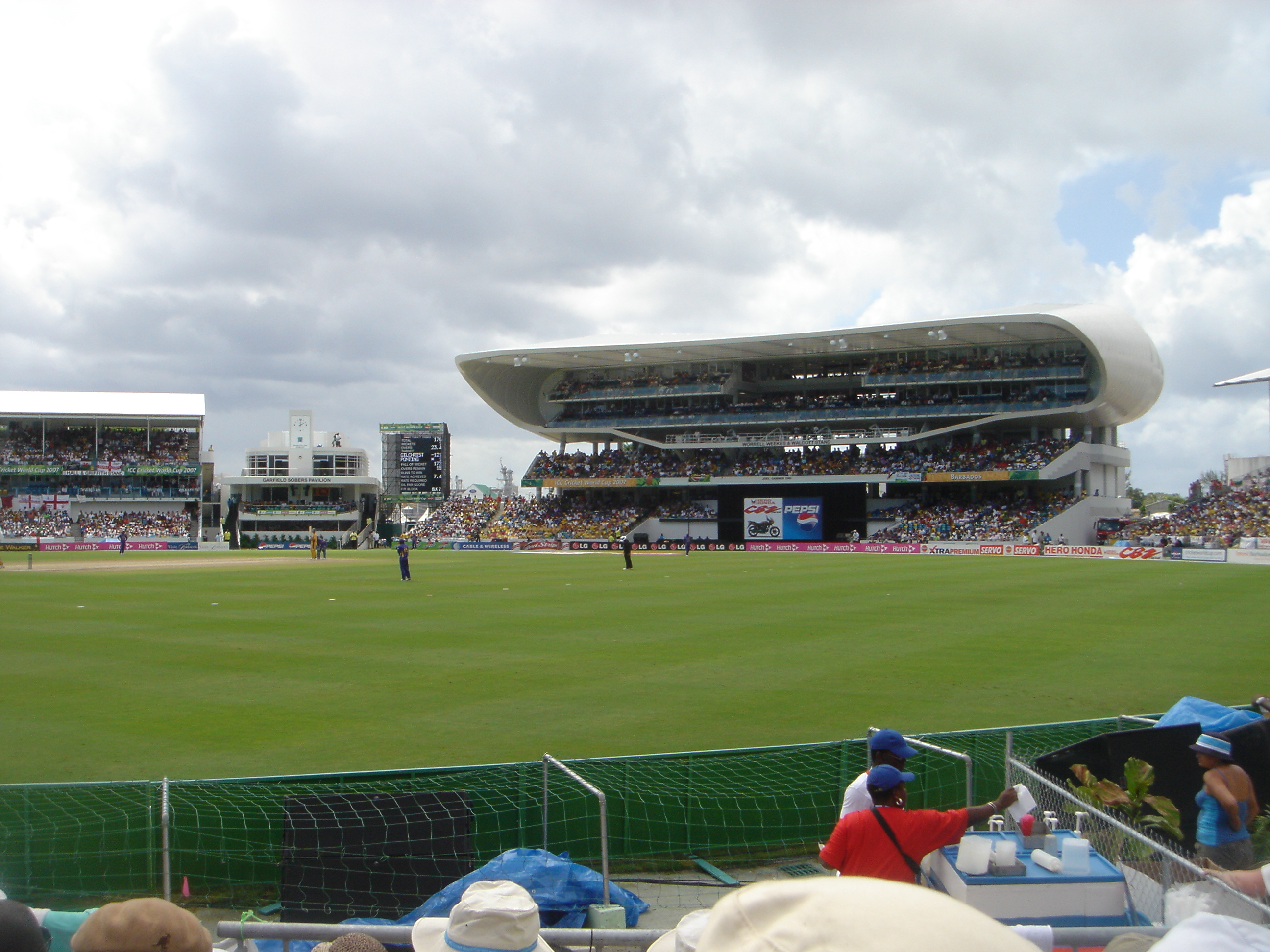
- The Kensington Oval (Pictured in 2007) in Bridgetown hosted the final
- Event: 2010 ICC World Twenty20
Australia	England
147/6	148/3
20 overs	17 overs
- England won by 7 wickets
- Date: 16 May 2010
- Venue: Kensington Oval, Bridgetown
- Player of the match: Craig Kieswetter (Eng)
- Umpires: Aleem Dar (Pak) and Billy Doctrove (WI)
- Attendance: 28,000

The 2010 ICC World Twenty20 Final was played between England and Australia at the Kensington Oval in Bridgetown, Barbados on 16 May 2010. This was the third ICC World Twenty20. England won the match by 7 wickets, its first World Twenty20 victory, and first ICC world championship for the cricket birthplace. England became the third team to win this title after India in 2007 and Pakistan in 2009.

== Background ==
Prior to this match, England and Australia had played four times against each other in Twenty20s, where Australia won 2 matches and England won one. One match ended with no result. Their most recent meeting was back in August 2009, where match ends no result. In the 2007 ICC World Twenty20, they met in Cape Town on 14 September, where Australia won the match by 8 wickets. The two teams were also less than six months from meeting in Australia, including for the 2010–11 Ashes series.

Following England's group-stage victory over South Africa, Kevin Pietersen was forced to rush back home to England for the birth of his first son, Dylan, before returning to the West Indies for the semi-final against Sri Lanka.

== Road to the final ==
=== England ===
England were placed in Group D with West Indies and Ireland after having made some team selections that had sparked discussion. Among those were Durham all-rounder and two-time Ashes winner Paul Collingwood being named T20 captain over Test and ODI captain Andrew Strauss, while Test and ODI attack leader James Anderson was in the T20 squad, but largely preferred to swing specialist Ryan Sidebottom. Another decision that became especially controversial was the inclusion of two naturalized South Africans as opening batsmen – Michael Lumb and wicketkeeper Craig Kieswetter – in addition to star batsman Kevin Pietersen, born in South Africa but with an English mother. The team also included Eoin Morgan – who, on a previous tour of the West Indies, had been in the Irish team that had upset Pakistan and Bangladesh during the 2007 World Cup and also eventually captained England's 2019 World Cup triumph on home soil. Two other Ashes-winning bowlers were also included in fast bowler Stuart Broad and off-spinner Graeme Swann.

They began the tournament in disappointing fashion with a defeat to hosts West Indies by 8 wickets on the D/L method. In the next match against Ireland, England batted first and scored 120/8 in their 20 overs. Rain reduced Ireland's innings to 3.3 overs, causing the match to be abandoned. This meant England qualified for the Super 8's with a higher net run rate. In the Super 8s, they found their form and won each of their matches, defeating Pakistan, New Zealand and South Africa to top Group E. In the semifinal against Sri Lanka, Pietersen's unbeaten 42 from 26 following a 2–21 from man of the match Broad helped secure a seven-wicket victory.

=== Australia ===
Having reached the semifinals of the first World T20 and won the previous three World Cups, Australia started the tournament as one of the favorites. They fielded a team that included future World Cup-winning captain Michael Clarke as T20 skipper after Test and ODI captain Ricky Ponting had withdrawn from Australia's T20 side, and he was backed up by players who had won Ashes series, World Cups or both, including batsman Michael Hussey (joined by brother David in the team), fast bowler Shaun Tait, all-rounder Shane Watson and Steve Smith, who was still a leg-spinning all-rounder at the time instead of a specialist batsman. Pacer Dirk Nannes was also in the team, having become an Australian citizen after helping his native Netherlands shock England at Lord's during the previous World T20. Stalwart fast bowler Brett Lee had also been named in the squad but was unable to participate.

They won Group A after beating both Bangladesh and defending champion Pakistan, and in the Super 8s, they comfortably defeated India, Sri Lanka and the West Indies to progress to the semifinals for a rematch with Pakistan. Pakistan batted first and posted a challenging total of 191. The Australian top order had no mercy for the Pakistani bowlers, but the match looked to be in the defending champions' hands, as Australia needed 51 runs off the last three overs, and were still 18 runs short, with the final over coming up against touted off-spinner Saeed Ajmal, a member of Pakistan's 2009 World T20 champions. Mike Hussey rose to the occasion, however, hitting three sixes and a four to get Australia to the target for a three-wicket victory with a ball to spare. Man of the match Hussey finished on 60 not out from 24 balls, having hit the most final over runs to complete a T20 international chase (his 22 was not surpassed until the West Indies' Carlos Brathwaite scored 24 off four consecutive sixes with 19 required against England's Ben Stokes to win the 2016 final.

== Team composition ==
Both teams were unchanged from their semi-final winning squads.

== Match details ==
=== Match officials ===
- On-field umpires: Aleem Dar (Pak) and Billy Doctrove (WI)
- TV umpire: Billy Bowden (NZ)
- Reserve umpire: Rudi Koertzen (SA)
- Match referee: Ranjan Madugalle (SL)

=== Toss ===
England's captain Paul Collingwood won the toss and elected to field.

=== Match summary ===
Australia started the match rather surprisingly. Both openers went for just 2 apiece, as Watson was caught by Swann when Kieswetter parried a chance off Sidebottom's pace bowling followed by a Lumb run-out of fellow opener David Warner. Sidebottom then had Aussie wicketkeeper Brad Haddin caught by Collingwood for Australia's third wicket down for just 8 runs. Captain Clarke paced the innings with David Hussey until Collingwood robbed his opposite number of his wicket with a diving catch off Swann's off-spin to leave Australia at 45/4. However, David Hussey continued his form with middle order batsmen (including Michael Hussey), scoring 59 off 54 as Australia posted 147 for 6 in their 20 overs.

England's first wicket fell for just seven runs as Lumb was caught by David Hussey trying to drive Tait past mid-on. However, England then took control as Kieswetter and all-time run scorer Pietersen (47 off 31) took the game away from Australia with a 111-run partnership for the second wicket, allowing Morgan and Collingwood to complete the chase with three overs to spare. With his 63 off 49 for his maiden international T20 half century, Kieswetter was adjudged man of the match, while Pietersen was the player of the tournament.

The win marked England's first ever ICC world championship after losses in the finals of the 1979 World Cup against the West Indies at Lord's, the 1987 World Cup against Australia in Kolkata and the 1992 World Cup against Pakistan in Melbourne, as well as a loss in the 2004 Champions Trophy final against the West Indies at the Oval. It also marked England's third world championship in one of their major sports after the 1966 FIFA (Football) World Cup, which England won as hosts, and the 2003 IRB Rugby World Cup, which England had also won against Australia in Sydney. Both England and Australia also named a number of their T20 players who contested the final in their Test squads for the Ashes, which England won 3–1 to not only retain the Ashes but also record its first Ashes series win in Australia for 24 years.

16 May
11:30
Scorecard

Australia; 147/6 (20 overs)	v	England; 148/3 (17 overs)
David Hussey 59 (54); Ryan Sidebottom 2/26 (4 overs)		Craig Kieswetter 63 (49); Steve Smith 1/21 (3 overs)

England won by 7 wickets
Kensington Oval, Bridgetown, Barbados
Umpires: Aleem Dar (Pak) and Billy Doctrove (WI)
Player of the match: Craig Kieswetter (Eng)

- England won the toss and elected to field.
- This was the first ICC event won by England.

== Scorecard ==
1st innings

Australia batting
Player	Status	Runs	Balls	4s	6s	Strike rate
Shane Watson	c Swann b Sidebottom	2	3	0	0	66.66
David Warner	run out (Lumb)	2	4	0	0	50.00
Michael Clarke *	c Collingwood b Swann	27	27	2	0	100.00
Brad Haddin †	c †Kieswetter b Sidebottom	1	2	0	0	50.00
David Hussey	run out (Wright/†Kieswetter)	59	54	2	2	109.25
Cameron White	c Broad b Wright	30	19	4	1	157.89
Michael Hussey	not out	17	10	2	0	170.00
Steve Smith	not out	1	2	0	0	50.00
Mitchell Johnson	did not bat					
Shaun Tait	did not bat					
Dirk Nannes	did not bat					
Extras	(b 1, lb 2, nb 1, w 4)	8				
Total	(6 wickets; 20 overs)	147		10	3	

Fall of wickets: 1/2 (Watson, 0.3 ov), 2/7 (Warner, 1.5 ov), 3/8 (Haddin, 2.1 ov), 4/45 (Clarke, 9.2 ov), 5/95 (White, 15.4 ov), 6/142 (DJ Hussey, 19.2 ov)

England bowling
Bowler	Overs	Maidens	Runs	Wickets	Econ	Wides	NBs
Ryan Sidebottom	4	0	26	2	6.50	3	0
Tim Bresnan	4	0	35	0	8.75	0	1
Stuart Broad	4	0	27	0	6.75	1	0
Graeme Swann	4	0	17	1	4.25	0	0
Michael Yardy	3	0	34	0	11.33	0	0
Luke Wright	1	0	5	1	5.00	0	0

2nd innings

England batting
Player	Status	Runs	Balls	4s	6s	Strike rate
Michael Lumb	c DJ Hussey b Tait	2	4	0	0	50.00
Craig Kieswetter †	b Johnson	63	49	7	2	128.57
Kevin Pietersen	c Warner b Smith	47	31	4	1	151.61
Paul Collingwood *	not out	12	5	1	1	240.00
Eoin Morgan	not out	15	13	0	1	115.38
Luke Wright						
Tim Bresnan						
Michael Yardy						
Graeme Swann						
Stuart Broad						
Ryan Sidebottom						
Extras	(lb 1, w 8)	9				
Total	(3 wickets; 17 overs)	148		12	5	

Fall of wickets: 1/7 (Lumb, 1.5 ov), 2/118 (Pietersen, 13.1 ov), 3/121 (Kieswetter, 14.1 ov)

Australia bowling
Bowler	Overs	Maidens	Runs	Wickets	Econ	Wides	NBs
Dirk Nannes	4	0	29	0	7.25	0	0
Shaun Tait	3	0	28	1	9.33	1	0
Mitchell Johnson	4	0	27	1	6.75	2	0
Steve Smith	3	0	21	1	7.00	0	0
Shane Watson	3	0	42	0	14.00	1	0

Key

- * – Captain
- † – Wicket-keeper
- c Fielder – Indicates that the batsman was dismissed by a catch by the named fielder
- b Bowler – Indicates which bowler gains credit for the dismissal
