= 2009 Twenty20 Cup final =

2009 Twenty20 Cup Final
- Event: 2009 Twenty20 Cup
Sussex Sharks	Somerset Sabres
172/7	109
20	17.2
- Sussex won by 63 runs
- Date: 15 August 2009
- Venue: Edgbaston, Birmingham
- Man of the match: Dwayne Smith
- Umpires: Richard Illingworth and Richard Kettleborough

The 2009 Twenty20 Cup Final was a cricket match between Somerset County Cricket Club and Sussex County Cricket Club played on 15 August 2009 at Edgbaston in Birmingham. It was the seventh final of the Twenty20 Cup, which was the first domestic Twenty20 competition between first-class sides.

Somerset were making their second appearance in a Twenty 20 final, having won the competition in 2005. In contrast, the furthest that Sussex had previously progressed was the semi-finals in 2007. Somerset won the toss and elected to bowl first, and despite claiming the early wicket of Murray Goodwin, Sussex scored quickly, mainly due to the 59 runs scored from 26 deliveries by Dwayne Smith. Sussex completed their batting innings with 172 runs. In Somerset's response, Marcus Trescothick scored quickly at the start of the innings, but after his dismissal in the fourth over, Somerset regularly lost wickets, and seven of their eleven batsmen did not reach double figures. The country were eventually bowled out for 109 runs, meaning that Sussex won the match by 63 runs.

== Match ==
=== Summary ===
Played on the same day as both the semi-finals, the match was played as a day/night game. Somerset captain Justin Langer won the toss and decided to let Sussex bat first. Murray Goodwin was dismissed early for the Sharks, caught by Somerset's wicket-keeper Craig Kieswetter off the bowling of Charl Willoughby. Despite that, by the end of the six-over powerplay, Sussex were well placed on 47 for one. However, the run out of Luke Wright was soon followed by two more wickets, and left Sussex on 80 for four. Dwayne Smith then scored rapidly to push the total up to 122, before he was stumped by Kieswetter, giving Max Waller his second wicket. Chris Nash and Yasir Arafat batted well together at the end of the innings to take Sussex's score to 172 for seven.

Marcus Trescothick opened the batting strongly for Somerset, quickly taking the score onto 43, but when he was caught by Rory Hamilton-Brown off the bowling of James Kirtley, Somerset never recovered. Langer, Zander de Bruyn and Peter Trego all made starts for Somerset, each reaching double figures, but none could sustain an innings to propel their team towards the target. Sussex's bowling, particularly that of Michael Yardy and Will Beer prevented Somerset from scoring quickly, and forced them to attempt "desperate shots". Somerset were eventually bowled out for 109 runs. Sussex won the match, and the Twenty20 Cup for the first time, by 63 runs, with Smith being named as man of the match.

=== Scorecard ===
==== Final ====
15 August 2009
Scorecard

Sussex Sharks; 172/7 (20 overs)	v	Somerset Sabres; 109 (17.2 overs)
Dwayne Smith 59 (26 balls); Max Waller 2/33 (3 overs)		Marcus Trescothick 33 (15 balls); James Kirtley 3/9 (2 overs)

Sussex won by 63 runs
Edgbaston, Birmingham
Umpires: RK Illingworth and RA Kettleborough
Player of the match: Dwayne Smith (Sussex)

=== Aftermath ===
Sussex's Smith was awarded the man of the match award, and the Sussex team were given £80,000 prize money. Both teams qualified for the inaugural Champions League Twenty20 competition, which had a combined prize fund of $6 million. In that competition, Sussex were eliminated in the first group stage, while Somerset progressed to the second group stage, but did not qualify for the semi-finals.
