= 2013 Twenty20 Cup =

2013 Friends Life t20
- Dates: 26 June 2013 – 17 August 2013
- Administrator: England and Wales Cricket Board
- Cricket format: Twenty20
- Tournament format(s): Group stage and knockout
- Champions: Northamptonshire Steelbacks (1st title)
- Participants: 18
- Matches: 97
- Attendance: 611,299 (6,302 per match)
- Most runs: Craig Kieswetter, Somerset (517)
- Most wickets: Azharullah, Northamptonshire (27)
- Official website: friendslife.co.uk/t20

The 2013 FriendsLife T20 was the eleventh edition of what would later become the T20 Blast, a domestic Twenty20 English cricket competition. The competition ran from 26 June to 17 August 2013. The teams and format of the tournament remained the same as the previous season. Northamptonshire Steelbacks were champions, defeating Surrey in the final to win their first limited overs trophy since 1992.

== Format ==
The 18 teams were divided into three groups of six and each group played a double round-robin tournament. The top two teams from each group and the top two third-placed teams qualified for the knockout stage: a three-round single-elimination tournament. The top team from each group and the best second-placed team then played in a different quarter-final at their home ground. A free draw determined the placement of the remaining four teams and the semi-final and final match-ups.

== Midlands/Wales/West Division ==
=== Table ===
Pos	Team	Pld	W	L	T	NR	Pts	NRR
1	Northamptonshire Steelbacks	10	7	3	0	0	14	0.329
2	Somerset	10	6	4	0	0	12	0.841
3	Glamorgan	10	5	5	0	0	10	−0.168
4	Warwickshire Bears	10	5	5	0	0	10	−0.410
5	Worcestershire Royals	10	4	6	0	0	8	−0.327
6	Gloucestershire Gladiators	10	3	7	0	0	6	−0.245

=== Results ===
	Glamorgan	Gloucestershire Gladiators	Northamptonshire Steelbacks	Somerset	Warwickshire Bears	Worcestershire Royals
Glamorgan		Gloucestershire; 9 wickets	Northamptonshire; 6 wickets	Glamorgan; 9 wickets	Glamorgan; 4 wickets	Glamorgan; 5 wickets
Gloucestershire Gladiators	Gloucestershire; 10 wickets		Northamptonshire; 17 runs	Somerset; 9 wickets	Warwickshire; 6 wickets	Gloucestershire; 48 runs
Northamptonshire Steelbacks	Northamptonshire; 7 wickets	Northamptonshire; 41 runs		Northamptonshire; 10 runs	Northamptonshire; 27 runs	Worcestershire; 37 runs
Somerset	Somerset; 64 runs	Somerset; 4 wickets	Somerset; 6 wickets		Somerset; 10 wickets	Worcestershire; 8 runs
Warwickshire Bears	Glamorgan; 8 wickets	Warwickshire; 7 wickets	Warwickshire; 3 wickets	Somerset; 10 runs		Warwickshire; 8 wickets
Worcestershire Royals	Glamorgan; 58 runs ^{(D/L)}	Worcestershire; 5 wickets	Northamptonshire; 5 runs	Worcestershire; 5 wickets	Warwickshire; 7 wickets	

Home team win	Away team win	Match abandoned

=== Fixtures ===
28 June
Scorecard

Glamorgan; 159/4 (14 overs)	v	Worcestershire Royals (H); 102/9 (14 overs)

Glamorgan won by 58 runs (D/L)
New Road, Worcester

28 June
Scorecard

Northamptonshire Steelbacks (H); 124/4 (12 overs)	v	Gloucestershire Gladiators; 83/9 (12 overs)

Northamptonshire won by 41 runs
County Ground, Northampton

30 June
Scorecard

Gloucestershire Gladiators (H); 184/5 (20 overs)	v	Worcestershire Royals; 136 (20 overs)

Gloucestershire won by 48 runs
County Ground, Bristol

3 July
Scorecard

Warwickshire Bears; 118 (20 overs)	v	Glamorgan (H); 121/6 (19.1 overs)

Glamorgan won by 4 wickets
Sophia Gardens, Cardiff

5 July
Scorecard

Gloucestershire Gladiators; 190/6 (20 overs)	v	Somerset (H); 192/6 (19.5 overs)

Somerset won by 4 wickets
County Ground, Taunton

5 July
Scorecard

Northamptonshire Steelbacks (H); 161/2 (20 overs)	v	Warwickshire Bears; 134/8 (20 overs)

Northamptonshire won by 27 runs
County Ground, Northampton

6 July
Scorecard

Warwickshire Bears (H); 126/8 (20 overs)	v	Glamorgan; 132/2 (17.4 overs)

Glamorgan won by 8 wickets
Rugby School Ground, Rugby, Warwickshire

7 July
Scorecard

Northamptonshire Steelbacks; 152/7 (20 overs)	v	Somerset (H); 155/4 (18.5 overs)

Somerset won by 6 wickets
County Ground, Taunton

7 July
Scorecard

Gloucestershire Gladiators; 119/9 (20 overs)	v	Worcestershire Royals (H); 120/5 (15 overs)

Worcestershire won by 5 wickets
New Road, Worcester

12 July
Scorecard

Worcestershire Royals (H); 188/5 (20 overs)	v	Warwickshire Bears; 189/3 (19 overs)

Warwickshire won by 7 wickets
New Road, Worcester

12 July
Scorecard

Somerset; 125/6 (20 overs)	v	Glamorgan (H); 126/1 (15.2 overs)

Glamorgan won by 9 wickets
Sophia Gardens, Cardiff

14 July
Scorecard

Gloucestershire Gladiators (H); 96 (18.4 overs)	v	Warwickshire Bears; 97/4 (17.1 overs)

Warwickshire won by 6 wickets
College Ground, Cheltenham

14 July
Scorecard

Glamorgan; 153/7 (20 overs)	v	Northamptonshire Steelbacks (H); 157/3 (20 overs)

Northamptonshire won by 7 wickets
County Ground, Northampton

14 July
Scorecard

Worcestershire Royals; 168/7 (20 overs)	v	Somerset (H); 160/8 (20 overs)

Worcestershire won by 8 runs
County Ground, Taunton

16 July
Scorecard

Northamptonshire Steelbacks; 206/3 (20 overs)	v	Gloucestershire Gladiators (H); 189/6 (20 overs)

Northamptonshire won by 17 runs
College Ground, Cheltenham

17 July
Scorecard

Northamptonshire Steelbacks (H); 150/8 (20 overs)	v	Somerset; 140/8 (20 overs)

Northamptonshire won by 10 runs
County Ground, Northampton

19 July
Scorecard

Somerset (H); 199/6 (20 overs)	v	Glamorgan; 135 (18.1 overs)

Somerset won by 64 runs
County Ground, Taunton

20 July
Scorecard

Northamptonshire Steelbacks; 111 (19.2 overs)	v	Warwickshire Bears (H); 115/7 (19.3 overs)

Warwickshire won by 3 wickets
Edgbaston, Birmingham

21 July
Scorecard

Glamorgan; 98/9 (20 overs)	v	Gloucestershire Gladiators (H); 99/0 (12.5 overs)

Gloucestershire won by 10 wickets
College Ground, Cheltenham

21 July
Scorecard

Warwickshire Bears; 73 (17 overs)	v	Somerset (H); 78/0 (8.3 overs)

Somerset won by 10 wickets
County Ground, Taunton

21 July
Scorecard

Northamptonshire Steelbacks; 137/6 (20 overs)	v	Worcestershire Royals (H); 132/6 (20 overs)

Northamptonshire won by 5 runs
New Road, Worcester

23 July
Scorecard

Worcestershire Royals; 157/6 (20 overs)	v	Glamorgan (H); 161/5 (19.1 overs)

Glamorgan won by 5 wickets
Sophia Gardens, Cardiff

24 July
Scorecard

Gloucestershire Gladiators; 145/7 (20 overs)	v	Warwickshire Bears (H); 149/3 (17.4 overs)

Warwickshire won by 7 wickets
Edgbaston, Birmingham

26 July
Scorecard

Gloucestershire Gladiators (H); 125 (20 overs)	v	Somerset; 129/1 (16.1 overs)

Somerset won by 9 wickets
County Ground, Bristol

26 July
Scorecard

Glamorgan (H); 125/9 (20 overs)	v	Northamptonshire Steelbacks; 129/4 (18.3 overs)

Northamptonshire won by 6 wickets
Sophia Gardens, Cardiff

26 July
Scorecard

Worcestershire Royals; 146/8 (20 overs)	v	Warwickshire Bears (H); 149/2 (17.3 overs)

Warwickshire won by 8 wickets
Edgbaston, Birmingham

27 July
Scorecard

Somerset; 188/4 (20 overs)	v	Worcestershire Royals (H); 191/5 (19.4 overs)

Worcestershire won by 5 wickets
New Road, Worcester

30 July
Scorecard

Glamorgan (H); 141/5 (20 overs)	v	Gloucestershire Gladiators; 145/1 (16.3 overs)

Gloucestershire won by 9 wickets
Sophia Gardens, Cardiff

30 July
Scorecard

Worcestershire Royals; 182/6 (20 overs)	v	Northamptonshire Steelbacks (H); 145/6 (20 overs)

Worcestershire won by 37 runs
County Ground, Northampton

30 July
Scorecard

Somerset; 175/5 (20 overs)	v	Warwickshire Bears (H); 165/3 (20 overs)

Somerset won by 10 runs
Edgbaston, Birmingham

== North Division ==
=== Table ===
Pos	Team	Pld	W	L	T	NR	Pts	NRR
1	Nottinghamshire Outlaws	10	7	3	0	0	14	1.009
2	Lancashire Lightning	10	5	3	2	0	12	0.177
3	Durham Dynamos^{†}	10	6	4	0	0	11.75	0.317
4	Leicestershire Foxes	10	4	5	1	0	9	0.417
5	Derbyshire Falcons	10	4	6	0	0	8	−0.604
6	Yorkshire Vikings	10	2	7	1	0	5	−1.223

^{†}Durham were deducted 0.25 points for a breach of team salary payments in 2012.

=== Results ===
	Derbyshire Falcons	Durham Dynamos	Lancashire Lightning	Leicestershire Foxes	Nottinghamshire Outlaws	Yorkshire Vikings
Derbyshire Falcons		Durham; 4 wickets	Derbyshire; 7 wickets	Leicestershire; 79 runs	Nottinghamshire; 6 wickets	Yorkshire; 6 runs
Durham Dynamos	Durham; 37 runs		Lancashire; 9 runs	Durham; 5 wickets	Nottinghamshire; 8 wickets	Durham; 76 runs
Lancashire Lightning	Lancashire; 12 runs	Lancashire; 25 runs		Lancashire; 4 runs	Nottinghamshire; 4 wickets	Lancashire; 8 wickets
Leicestershire Foxes	Derbyshire; 24 runs	Leicestershire; 11 runs	Match tied		Leicestershire; 7 wickets	Leicestershire; 10 wickets
Nottinghamshire Outlaws	Derbyshire; 16 runs	Durham; 3 wickets	Nottinghamshire; 60 runs	Nottinghamshire; 7 wickets		Nottinghamshire; 6 wickets
Yorkshire Vikings	Derbyshire; 2 wickets	Durham; 4 wickets	Match tied	Yorkshire; 7 wickets	Nottinghamshire; 25 runs	

Home team win	Away team win	Match abandoned

=== Fixtures ===
28 June
Scorecard

Lancashire Lightning; 165/3 (20 overs)	v	Durham Dynamos (H); 156/8 (20 overs)

Lancashire won by 9 runs
Riverside Ground, Chester-le-Street

28 June
Scorecard

Leicestershire Foxes; 183/8 (20 overs)	v	Nottinghamshire Outlaws (H); 184/3 (17.4 overs)

Nottinghamshire won by 7 wickets
Trent Bridge, Nottingham

28 June
Scorecard

Yorkshire Carnegie (H); 119/8 (20 overs)	v	Derbyshire Falcons; 120/8 (19.3 overs)

Derbyshire won by 2 wickets
Headingley, Leeds

29 June
Scorecard

Derbyshire Falcons; 173/3 (20 overs)	v	Leicestershire Foxes (H); 149 (18.2 overs)

Derbyshire won by 24 runs
Grace Road, Leicester

30 June
Scorecard

Yorkshire Carnegie (H); 146/7 (20 overs)	v	Durham Dynamos; 147/6 (19.5 overs)

Durham won by 4 wickets
North Marine Road Ground, Scarborough

1 July
Scorecard

Lancashire Lightning (H); 155/6 (20 overs)	v	Nottinghamshire Outlaws; 159/6 (17.4 overs)

Nottinghamshire won by 4 wickets
Old Trafford, Manchester

2 July
Scorecard

Lancashire Lightning; 151/8 (20 overs)	v	Derbyshire Falcons (H); 154/3 (19.3 overs)

Derbyshire won by 7 wickets
County Ground, Derby

5 July
Scorecard

Leicestershire Foxes (H); 176/5 (20 overs)	v	Durham Dynamos; 165 (19.5 overs)

Leicestershire won by 11 runs
Grace Road, Leicester

5 July
Scorecard

Yorkshire Carnegie (H); 152/6 (20 overs)	v	Lancashire Lightning; 152/5 (20 overs)

Match tied
Headingley, Leeds

5 July
Scorecard

Derbyshire Falcons (H); 115/9 (20 overs)	v	Nottinghamshire Outlaws; 116/4 (17.3 overs)

Nottinghamshire won by 6 wickets
County Ground, Derby

6 July
Scorecard

Durham Dynamos (H); 154/4 (20 overs)	v	Nottinghamshire Outlaws; 156/2 (15.3 overs)

Nottinghamshire won by 8 wickets
Riverside Ground, Chester-le-Street

7 July
Scorecard

Lancashire Lightning (H); 155/4 (20 overs)	v	Leicestershire Foxes; 151/7 (20 overs)

Lancashire won by 4 runs
Old Trafford, Manchester

9 July
Scorecard

Leicestershire Foxes; 113/9 (20 overs)	v	Yorkshire Carnegie (H); 117/3 (16.5 overs)

Yorkshire won by 7 wickets
Headingley, Leeds

12 July
Scorecard

Durham Dynamos (H); 215/6 (20 overs)	v	Yorkshire Carnegie; 139/8 (20 overs)

Durham won by 76 runs
Riverside Ground, Chester-le-Street

12 July
Scorecard

Nottinghamshire Outlaws; 158/6 (20 overs)	v	Leicestershire Foxes (H); 161/3 (17.4 overs)

Leicestershire won by 7 wickets
Grace Road, Leicester

12 July
Scorecard

Lancashire Lightning (H); 165/9 (20 overs)	v	Derbyshire Falcons; 153/6 (20 over)

Lancashire won by 12 runs
Old Trafford, Manchester

14 July
Scorecard

Yorkshire Carnegie; 142/9 (20 overs)	v	Derbyshire Falcons (H); 136/5 (20 overs)

Yorkshire won by 6 runs
Queen's Park, Chesterfield

14 July
Scorecard

Lancashire Lightning (H); 170/5 (20 overs)	v	Durham Dynamos; 145/5 (20 overs)

Lancashire won by 25 runs
Old Trafford, Manchester

19 July
Scorecard

Nottinghamshire Outlaws (H); 159/7 (20 overs)	v	Durham Dynamos; 160/7 (20 overs)

Durham won by 3 wickets
Trent Bridge, Nottingham

21 July
Scorecard

Derbyshire Falcons (H); 136/7 (20 overs)	v	Durham Dynamos; 137/6 (18.4 overs)

Durham won by 4 wickets
Queen's Park, Chesterfield

21 July
Scorecard

Nottinghamshire Outlaws; 155/8 (20 overs)	v	Yorkshire Carnegie (H); 130/6 (20 overs)

Nottinghamshire won by 25 runs
Headingley, Leeds

23 July
Scorecard

Leicestershire Foxes (H); 139/9 (20 overs)	v	Lancashire Lightning; 139/9 (20 overs)

Match tied
Grace Road, Leicester

23 July
Scorecard

Derbyshire Falcons; 108/1 (9 overs)	v	Nottinghamshire Outlaws (H); 92/7 (9 overs)

Derbyshire won by 16 runs
Trent Bridge, Nottingham

24 July
Scorecard

Yorkshire Carnegie; 124/8 (20 overs)	v	Lancashire Lightning (H); 127/2 (11 overs)

Lancashire won by 8 wickets
Old Trafford, Manchester

25 July
Scorecard

Leicestershire Foxes; 119/7 (20 overs)	v	Durham Dynamos (H); 120/5 (18 overs)

Durham won by 5 wickets
Riverside Ground, Chester-le-Street

26 July
Scorecard

Yorkshire Carnegie; 132/7 (20 overs)	v	Nottinghamshire Outlaws (H); 133/4 (16.1 overs)

Nottinghamshire won by 6 wickets
Trent Bridge, Nottingham

26 July
Scorecard

Leicestershire Foxes; 151/6 (20 overs)	v	Derbyshire Falcons (H); 72 (14.1 overs)

Leicestershire won by 79 runs
County Ground, Derby

28 July
Scorecard

Durham Dynamos (H); 187/3 (20 overs)	v	Derbyshire Falcons; 150 (18.5 overs)

Durham won by 37 runs
Riverside Ground, Chester-le-Street

28 July
Scorecard

Yorkshire Carnegie; 105 (17.2 overs)	v	Leicestershire Foxes (H); 106/0 (12.1 overs)

Leicestershire won by 10 wickets
Grace Road, Leicester

28 July
Scorecard

Nottinghamshire Outlaws (H); 194/6 (20 overs)	v	Lancashire Lightning; 134 (16.5 overs)

Nottinghamshire won by 60 runs
Trent Bridge, Nottingham

== South Division ==
=== Table ===
Pos	Team	Pld	W	L	T	NR	Pts	NRR
1	Hampshire Royals	10	8	1	0	1	17	0.810
2	Surrey	10	7	3	0	0	14	0.915
3	Essex Eagles	10	5	4	0	1	11	−0.040
4	Middlesex Panthers	10	5	5	0	0	10	−0.194
5	Kent Spitfires	10	3	7	0	0	6	−0.941
6	Sussex Sharks	10	1	9	0	0	2	−0.520

=== Results ===
	Essex Eagles	Hampshire Royals	Kent Spitfires	Middlesex Panthers	Surrey	Sussex Sharks
Essex Eagles		Abandoned; No result	Essex; 62 runs	Middlesex; 8 wickets	Surrey; 61 runs	Essex; 6 wickets
Hampshire Royals	Hampshire; 5 wickets		Kent; 8 runs	Hampshire; 8 runs	Hampshire; 5 wickets	Hampshire; 4 wickets
Kent Spitfires	Essex; 47 runs	Hampshire; 62 runs		Middlesex; 4 wickets ^{(D/L)}	Surrey; 31 runs	Kent; 9 runs
Middlesex Panthers	Middlesex; 7 wickets	Hampshire; 7 wickets	Middlesex; 9 wickets		Surrey; 86 runs	Sussex; 24 runs
Surrey	Essex; 8 wickets	Hampshire; 7 wickets	Surrey; 5 wickets	Surrey; 15 runs		Surrey; 3 runs
Sussex Sharks	Essex; 7 wickets	Hampshire; 5 wickets	Kent; 8 wickets	Middlesex; 6 wickets	Surrey; 10 runs	

Home team win	Away team win	Match abandoned

=== Fixtures ===
26 June
Scorecard

Surrey; 139/6 (20 overs)	v	Hampshire Royals (H); 144/5 (19.2 overs)

Hampshire won by 5 wickets
The Rose Bowl, Southampton

28 June
Scorecard

Essex Eagles (H); 18/1 (2.1 overs)	v	Hampshire Royals

No result
County Ground, Chelmsford

28 June
Scorecard

Kent Spitfires (H); 129/5 (15 overs)	v	Middlesex Panthers; 111/6 (11.4 overs)

Middlesex won by 4 wickets (D/L)
St Lawrence Ground, Canterbury

28 June
Scorecard

Surrey; 157/6 (20 overs)	v	Sussex Sharks (H); 147/7 (20 overs)

Surrey won by 10 runs
County Ground, Hove

30 June
Scorecard

Surrey; 176/3 (20 overs)	v	Kent Spitfires (H); 145/9 (20 overs)

Surrey won by 31 runs
St Lawrence Ground, Canterbury

30 June
Scorecard

Sussex Sharks; 202/3 (20 overs)	v	Middlesex Panthers (H); 178/8 (20 overs)

Sussex won by 24 runs
Lord's, London

3 July
Scorecard

Surrey (H); 139/6 (20 overs)	v	Sussex Sharks; 136/8 (20 overs)

Surrey won by 3 runs
Kennington Oval, London

4 July
Scorecard

Essex Eagles; 170/8 (20 overs)	v	Middlesex Panthers (H); 174/3 (19.4 overs)

Middlesex won by 7 wickets
Lord's, London

5 July
Scorecard

Essex Eagles; 164/6 (20 overs)	v	Kent Spitfires (H); 117 (17.3 overs)

Essex won by 47 runs
St Lawrence Ground, Canterbury

5 July
Scorecard

Surrey (H); 147/9 (20 overs)	v	Middlesex Panthers; 132/8 (20 overs)

Surrey won by 15 runs
Kennington Oval, London

5 July
Scorecard

Sussex Sharks (H); 145/6 (20 overs)	v	Hampshire Royals; 148/5 (19.3 overs)

Hampshire won by 5 wickets
County Ground, Hove

7 July
Scorecard

Kent Spitfires; 140/6 (20 overs)	v	Middlesex Panthers (H); 142/1 (15.4 overs)

Middlesex won by 9 wickets
Uxbridge Cricket Club Ground

8 July
Scorecard

Essex Eagles (H); 180/8 (20 overs)	v	Kent Spitfires; 118 (17.3 overs)

Essex won by 62 runs
County Ground, Chelmsford

12 July
Scorecard

Essex Eagles (H); 74 (16.5 overs)	v	Middlesex Panthers; 77 (7.83 overs)

Middlesex won by 8 wickets
County Ground, Chelmsford

12 July
Scorecard

Sussex Sharks; 118 (20 overs)	v	Hampshire Royals (H); 122 (20 overs)

Hampshire won by 4 wickets
The Rose Bowl, Southampton

14 July
Scorecard

Sussex Sharks; 171 (20 overs)	v	Essex Eagles (H); 172 (19.2 overs)

Essex won by 6 wickets
County Ground, Chelmsford

14 July
Scorecard

Middlesex Panthers (H); 162 (20 overs)	v	Hampshire Royals; 164 (15.1 overs)

Hampshire won by 7 wickets
[Old Deer Park, Richmond

15 July
Scorecard

Essex Eagles; 148/6 (20 overs)	v	Surrey (H); 149/2 (18.5 overs)

Essex won by 8 wickets
Kennington Oval, London

16 July
Scorecard

Sussex Sharks (H); 152/4 (19.4 overs)	v	Middlesex Panthers; 148/7 (20 overs)

Middlesex won by 6 wickets
County Ground, Hove

19 July
Scorecard

Surrey (H); 126/6 (20 overs)	v	Hampshire Royals; 127/3 (18.2 overs)

Hampshire won by 7 wickets
Kennington Oval, London

21 July
Scorecard

Kent Spitfires; 143/8 (20 overs)	v	Hampshire Royals (H); 135/8 (20 overs)

Kent won by 8 runs
The Rose Bowl, Southampton

21 July
Scorecard

Sussex Sharks (H); 146/8 (20 overs)	v	Essex Eagles; 147/3 (17.1 overs)

Essex won by 7 wickets
County Ground, Hove

24 July
Scorecard

Kent Spitfires (H); 173/3 (20 overs)	v	Sussex Sharks; 164/6 (20 overs)

Kent won by 9 runs
St Lawrence Ground, Canterbury

25 July
Scorecard

Surrey; 178/7 (20 overs)	v	Middlesex Panthers (H); 92 (14 overs)

Surrey won by 86 runs
Lord's, London

26 July
Scorecard

Essex Eagles; 182/5 (20 overs)	v	Hampshire Royals (H); 183/5 (19.2 overs)

Hampshire won by 5 wickets
The Rose Bowl, Southampton

26 July
Scorecard

Kent Spitfires; 139/4 (20 overs)	v	Surrey (H); 140/5 (19.1 overs)

Surrey won by 5 wickets
Kennington Oval, London

29 July
Scorecard

Hampshire Royals; 185/6 (20 overs)	v	Kent Spitfires (H); 123/9 (20 overs)

Hampshire won by 62 runs
St Lawrence Ground, Canterbury

31 July
Scorecard

Surrey; 165 (20 overs)	v	Essex Eagles (H); 104 (16.2 overs)

Surrey won by 61 runs
County Ground, Chelmsford

31 July
Scorecard

Hampshire Royals (H); 190/3 (20 overs)	v	Middlesex Panthers; 182/7 (20 overs)

Hampshire won by 8 runs
The Rose Bowl, Southampton

31 July
Scorecard

Sussex Sharks (H); 113 (20 overs)	v	Kent Spitfires; 117/2 (13.1 overs)

Kent won by 8 wickets
County Ground, Hove

== Knockout stage ==
Quarter-finals
M2	Somerset	148/6
S2	Surrey (H)	151/7
S1	Hampshire Royals (H)	202/3
N2	Lancashire Lightning	201/4
M1	Northamptonshire Steelbacks (H)	183/4
N3	Durham Dynamos	147/6
S3	Essex Eagles	187/6
N1	Nottinghamshire Outlaws (H)	140

Semi-finals
S2	Surrey	145/6
S1	Hampshire Royals	142/9
M1	Northamptonshire Steelbacks	171/3
S3	Essex Eagles	168/5

Final
S2	Surrey	92
M1	Northamptonshire Steelbacks	194/2

=== Quarter-finals ===
6 August
16:00
Scorecard

Somerset; 148/6 (20 overs)	v	Surrey (H); 151/7 (19 overs)
Craig Kieswetter 70* (51); Jade Dernbach 2/30 (4 overs)		Vikram Solanki 38 (23); Peter Trego 2/16 (4 overs)

Surrey won by 3 wickets
Kennington Oval, London
Umpires: Michael Gough and Tim Robinson
Player of the match: Vikram Solanki

- Somerset won the toss and elected to bat.

6 August
19:00 (D/N)
Scorecard

Northamptonshire Steelbacks (H); 183/4 (20 overs)	v	Durham Dynamos; 147/6 (20 overs)
Cameron White 58* (32); Gareth Breese 1/38 (4 overs)		Ben Stokes 51* (29); James Middlebrook 2/26 (3 overs)

Northamptonshire won by 36 runs
County Ground, Northampton
Umpires: Peter Hartley and Jeremy Lloyds
Player of the match: Cameron White

- Northamptonshire Steelbacks won the toss and elected to bat.

7 August
19:00 (D/N)
Scorecard

Hampshire Royals (H); 202/3 (20 overs)	v	Lancashire Lightning; 201/4 (20 overs)
Michael Carberry 100* (66); Kabir Ali 1/20 (2 overs)		Karl Brown 49 (28); Danny Briggs 2/36 (4 overs)

Hampshire won by 1 run
The Rose Bowl, Southampton
Umpires: Neil Mallender and David Millns
Player of the match: Michael Carberry

- Lancashire Lightning won the toss and elected to field.

8 August
19:00 (D/N)
Scorecard

Essex Eagles; 187/6(17.2 overs)	v	Nottinghamshire Outlaws (H); 140 (20 overs)
Ryan ten Doeschate 82 (47); Ian Butler 3/23 (4 overs)		David Hussey 61 (48); Shaun Tait 4/29 (4 overs)

Essex won by 47 runs
Trent Bridge, Nottingham
Umpires: Rob Bailey and Nigel Llong
Player of the match: Ryan ten Doeschate

- Nottinghamshire Outlaws won the toss and elected to field.

=== Semi-finals ===
17 August
11:00
Scorecard

Essex Eagles; 168/5 (20 overs)	v	Northamptonshire Steelbacks; 171/3 (18.1 overs)
Graham Napier 38* (15); Azharullah 2/38 (4 overs)		Richard Levi 57 (35); Reece Topley 2/24 (4 overs)

Northamptonshire won by 7 wickets
Edgbaston, Birmingham
Umpires: Neil Mallender and Tim Robinson
Player of the match: Steven Crook

- Northamptonshire won the toss and elected to field.

17 August
14:30
Scorecard

Hampshire Royals; 142/9 (20 overs)	v	Surrey; 145/6 (19.2 overs)
Sean Ervine 47 (32); Azhar Mahmood 2/9 (4 overs)		Zander de Bruyn 41* (40); Chris Wood 2/40 (4 overs)

Surrey won by 4 wickets
Edgbaston, Birmingham
Umpires: Rob Bailey and Michael Gough
Player of the match: Azhar Mahmood

- Surrey won the toss and elected to field.

=== Final ===
17 August
18:45 (D/N)
Scorecard

Northamptonshire Steelbacks; 194/2 (18/18 overs)	v	Surrey; 92 (13.3/18 overs)
David Willey 60 (27); Jon Lewis 1/24 (3 overs)		Glenn Maxwell 29 (17); David Willey 4/9 (2.3 overs)

Northamptonshire won by 102 runs (D/L)
Edgbaston, Birmingham
Umpires: Michael Gough and Neil Mallender
Player of the match: David Willey

- Surrey won the toss and elected to field.
- Northamptonshire's innings was interrupted by rain which reduced both teams' innings to 18 overs.

== Personnel ==
Team	Coach	Captain	Overseas player(s)
Derbyshire Falcons	(England) Karl Krikken	(South Africa) Wayne Madsen	(Cricket West Indies) Shivnarine Chanderpaul (South Africa) Albie Morkel
Durham Dynamos	(England) Geoff Cook	(South Africa) Dale Benkenstein	—
Essex Eagles	(England) Paul Grayson	(England) James Foster	(New Zealand) Hamish Rutherford (Australia) Shaun Tait
Glamorgan	(Australia) Matthew Mott	(Australia) Marcus North	(New Zealand) Nathan McCullum (Australia) Marcus North
Gloucestershire Gladiators	(New Zealand) John Bracewell	(Australia) Michael Klinger	(Australia) Daniel Christian (Australia) Michael Klinger
Hampshire Royals	(England) Giles White	(England) Dimitri Mascarenhas	(Pakistan) Sohail Tanvir
Kent Spitfires	(Cricket West Indies) Jimmy Adams	(England) James Tredwell	(South Africa) Vernon Philander
Lancashire Lightning	(England) Peter Moores	(England) Glen Chapple	(Australia) Simon Katich (New Zealand) Mitchell McClenaghan
Leicestershire Foxes	(England) Phil Whitticase	(England) Josh Cobb	(Australia) Joe Burns (Bangladesh) Shakib Al Hasan
Middlesex Panthers	(England) Richard Scott	(England) Neil Dexter	(New Zealand) Kyle Mills (Australia) Adam Voges
Northamptonshire Steelbacks	(England) David Ripley	(England) Alex Wakely	(South Africa) Richard Levi (Australia) Cameron White
Nottinghamshire Outlaws	(England) Mick Newell	(Australia) David Hussey	(New Zealand) Ian Butler (Australia) David Hussey
Somerset	(England) Andy Hurry	(England) Marcus Trescothick	(South Africa) Alviro Petersen (Pakistan) Yasir Arafat
Surrey	(England) Alec Stewart (acting)	(England) Gareth Batty	(Ireland) Kevin O'Brien (Australia) Ricky Ponting
Sussex Sharks	(England) Mark Robinson	(Ireland) Ed Joyce	(Cricket West Indies) Dwayne Smith (New Zealand) Scott Styris
Warwickshire Bears	(Scotland) Dougie Brown	(England) Jim Troughton	(New Zealand) Jeetan Patel
Worcestershire Royals	(England) Steve Rhodes	(England) Daryl Mitchell	(Cricket West Indies) Andre Russell (Sri Lanka) Thilan Samaraweera
Yorkshire Vikings	(Australia) Jason Gillespie	(England) Andrew Gale	—

== Statistics ==
=== Highest team totals ===
The following table lists the five highest team scores in the season.

Team	Total	Opponent	Ground
Durham	215/6	Yorkshire	Riverside Ground, Chester-le-Street
Northamptonshire	206/3	Gloucestershire	College Ground, Cheltenham
Sussex	202/3	Middlesex	Lord's Cricket Ground, London
Hampshire	202/3	Lancashire	Rose Bowl, Southampton
Lancashire	201/4	Hampshire	Rose Bowl, Southampton

=== Most runs ===
The top five highest run scorers (total runs) in the season are included in this table.

Player	Team	Runs	Inns	Avg	S/R	HS	100s	50s	4s	6s
Craig Kieswetter	Somerset	517	11	64.62	137.13	89*	0	5	46	19
Michael Carberry	Hampshire	502	11	55.77	142.61	100*	1	4	59	16
Cameron White	Northamptonshire	417	13	46.33	125.60	71*	0	4	29	18
Phil Mustard	Durham	379	11	34.35	123.45	91	0	3	41	11
Michael Klinger	Gloucestershire	366	10	52.28	129.32	108*	1	2	33	11

=== Highest scores ===
This table contains the top five highest scores of the season made by a batsman in a single innings.

Player	Team	Score	Balls	4s	6s	Opponent	Ground
Richard Levi	Northamptonshire	110*	62	15	4	Gloucestershire	College Ground, Cheltenham
Michael Klinger	Gloucestershire	108*	64	9	5	Worcestershire	County Ground, Bristol
Michael Carberry	Hampshire	100*	66	11	3	Lancashire	Rose Bowl, Southampton
Michael Lumb	Nottinghamshire	96	52	14	3	Durham	Riverside Ground, Chester-le-Street
Steven Davies	Surrey	95*	70	12	1	Kent	St Lawrence Ground, Canterbury

=== Most wickets ===
The following table contains the five leading wicket-takers of the season.

Player	Team	Wkts	Inns	Ave	S/R	Econ	BBI
Azharullah	Northamptonshire	27	12	12.62	10.1	7.44	4/14
Reece Topley	Essex	21	11	13.23	10.5	7.51	4/26
David Willey	Northamptonshire	21	12	13.33	12.1	6.58	4/9
Yasir Arafat	Somerset	20	11	14.60	12.3	7.90	4/5
Jade Dernbach	Surrey	18	12	16.44	14.7	6.70	3/15

=== Best bowling figures ===
This table lists the top five players with the best bowling figures in the season.

Player	Team	Overs	Figures	Opponent	Ground
Graham Wagg	Glamorgan	3.0	5/14	Worcestershire	New Road, Worcester
Jack Brooks	Yorkshire	4.0	5/21	Leicestershire	Headingley, Leeds
Graeme White	Nottinghamshire	4.0	5/22	Lancashire	Trent Bridge, Nottingham
Mitchell McClenaghan	Lancashire	4.0	5/29	Nottinghamshire	Old Trafford, Manchester
Moeen Ali	Worcestershire	4.0	5/34	Northamptonshire	County Ground, Northampton

== Media coverage ==
Sky Sports showed many games during 2013, after showing them throughout the 2010, 2011 and 2012 seasons. S4C also offers some coverage with a few Glamorgan matches available with Welsh commentary.

Country	TV Broadcaster(s)	Notes
United Kingdom	Sky Sports	Official Broadcasters of the tournament.
Pakistan	Pakistan Television Corporation	Broadcast on PTV Sports.
India	ESPN Star Sports	Broadcast on STAR Cricket.
Wales	S4C	Broadcast in Welsh commentary.
Australia	Fox Sports Pty Limited	Broadcast on Fox Sports
