= Trevor Holmes =

English cricketer

Personal information
- Full name: John Trevor Holmes
- Born: 16 November 1939; Yorkshire, England
- Died: 26 November 2022 (aged 83)
- Batting: Right-handed

Domestic team information
- Years: Team
- 1969: Somerset

Career statistics
Competition	FC
Matches	1
Runs scored	8
Batting average	4.00
100s/50s	0/0
Top score	8
Catches/stumpings	1/–
- Source: CricketArchive, 22 December 2015

John Trevor Holmes (16 November 1939 – 26 November 2022) was an English first-class cricketer. Born in Holmfirth, Yorkshire, he played as a right-handed batsman and wicket-keeper for Somerset.

Holmes made a single first-class appearance for the team, during the 1969 season, against the touring West Indians. Holmes scored a duck in the first innings in which he batted, and 8 runs in the second, as Somerset lost the match by a wide margin. According to one account, Holmes' selection for Somerset was "on the strength of a 2nd XI match at Pontypridd and typical surge of enthusiasm from the current coach, Bill Andrews".
