= Royston Sully =

English cricketer (born 1951)

Personal information
- Full name: Royston Cyril John Sully
- Born: 10 April 1951 (age 75); Taunton, Somerset, England
- Batting: Right-handed
- Bowling: Right-arm medium

Domestic team information
- Years: Team
- 1985: Somerset

Career statistics
Competition	List A
Matches	1
Runs scored	2
Batting average	2.00
100s/50s	0/0
Top score	2
Balls bowled	12
Wickets	0
Bowling average	–
5 wickets in innings	–
10 wickets in match	–
Best bowling	–
Catches/stumpings	0/–
- Source: CricketArchive, 22 December 2015

Royston Cyril John Sully (born 10 April 1951), played one List A Cricket match for Somerset in the 1985 season.

Sully, who was born at Taunton, was a right-arm medium-pace bowler and a right-handed lower order batsman who had played occasional matches for Somerset's second eleven in the Minor Counties Championship and the Second Eleven Championship from 1977, often opening the bowling and making useful lower order runs. He was brought into Somerset's first team for the Sunday League match against Glamorgan in May 1985 at Taunton. He scored two runs in Somerset's innings and bowled two overs that cost 15 runs, failing to take a wicket.
