= Murray Turner =

English cricketer (born 1964)

Personal information
- Full name: Murray Stuart Turner
- Born: 27 January 1964 (age 62); Shaftesbury, Dorset, England
- Batting: Right-handed
- Bowling: Right-arm fast-medium
- Role: All-rounder

Domestic team information
- Years: Team
- 1984–1986: Somerset
- First-class debut: 13 June 1984 Somerset v Lancashire
- Last First-class: 9 May 1986 Somerset v Glamorgan
- List A debut: 4 May 1985 Somerset v Minor Counties
- Last List A: 27 July 1986 Somerset v Lancashire

Career statistics
Competition	First-class	List A
Matches	12	17
Runs scored	144	91
Batting average	18.00	13.00
100s/50s	–/–	–/–
Top score	24*	22*
Balls bowled	1379	653
Wickets	15	14
Bowling average	52.53	41.21
5 wickets in innings	–	–
10 wickets in match	–	–
Best bowling	4/74	3/22
Catches/stumpings	2/–	2/–
- Source: CricketArchive, 4 March 2011

Murray Stuart Turner (born 27 January 1964) played first-class and List A cricket for Somerset from 1984 to 1986. He was born at Shaftesbury, Dorset.

Turner was a lower-order right-handed batsman and a right-arm fast-medium bowler. Though born in Dorset, his club cricket was in the Taunton area and he appeared for Somerset's second eleven and its colts' team at the age of 17. He made his first-team debut in a single first-class match in the 1984 season, but then played fairly regularly in both the first-class and one-day formats in 1985, when Somerset had an unexpectedly poor season and finished at the bottom of the County Championship. In 10 first-class matches, Turner averaged nearly 24 with the bat, though that was in part due to half his 12 innings ending with him not out, and his highest score was an unbeaten 24 against Warwickshire in the match where Viv Richards made 322. In the same game, Turner took four wickets for 74 runs, the only time he took more than two first-class wickets in an innings. He was no more successful in one-day matches, where in 13 outings he took only 10 wickets and made 68 runs. Wisden Cricketers' Almanack wrote: "Turner... had a few good days, but not enough to attract another contract." But though no longer on the staff, Turner did play a little for Somerset in 1986, appearing in a single first-class fixture and four List A games, in one of which, against Glamorgan, he made an unbeaten 22, his best one-day score.

After finishing in first-class cricket, Turner joined the Royal Air Force where, according to one account, "he found renewed scope for runs and, more significantly for a quickish bowler, wickets."
