= John Jordan (cricketer) =

English cricketer (1932–2007)

John Jordan (7 February 1932 – 2007) was an English cricketer who played first-class cricket for Lancashire as a lower-order batsman and wicket-keeper between 1955 and 1957. He was born at Rawtenstall.
