= Peter Cleal =

Australian rules footballer

Personal information
- Full name: Peter Hanslow Cleal
- Born: 6 April 1903; Clifton Hill, Victoria
- Died: 7 March 1979 (aged 75); Fitzroy, Victoria
- Original team: Murrumbeena
- Height: 185 cm (6 ft 1 in)
- Weight: 82 kg (181 lb)

Playing career^{1}
Years	Club	Games (Goals)
1925	St Kilda	4 (0)
- ^{1} Playing statistics correct to the end of 1925.

Peter Hanslow Cleal (6 April 1903 – 7 March 1979) was an Australian rules footballer who played with St Kilda in the Victorian Football League (VFL).
