= Imperial Athletic Ground, Bristol =

Cricket ground in Bristol, England

Coordinates: 51.42892°N 2.55779°W

Imperial Athletic Ground
Ground information
- Location: Bristol
- Establishment: 1957 (first recorded match)

Team information
Somerset	(1957, 1959-1966 & 1971-1979)
- As of 30 August 2010; Source: Ground profile

The Imperial Athletic Ground was a cricket ground in south Bristol owned by the Imperial Tobacco group and used by Somerset. The first first-class match on the ground was in 1957, when Somerset played Sussex in the County Championship. From 1957 to 1966, the ground played host to 9 first-class matches, with the final first-class match held at the ground between Somerset and Hampshire.

The ground also hosted List-A matches, the first of which was between Somerset and Gloucestershire in the 1971 John Player League. Between 1971 and 1979, the ground held 8 List-A matches, the last of which was between Somerset and Gloucestershire in the 1979 John Player League.

During its existence the ground also played host to Somerset Second XI matches in the Minor Counties Championship, Second XI Championship and Second XI Trophy.

In 2000 the ground was sold by the local council and a modern housing estate today covers it.
