= Andrew Payne (cricketer) =

English cricketer

Personal information
- Full name: Andrew Payne
- Born: 20 October 1973 (age 53); Rossendale Valley, Lancashire, England
- Batting: Right-handed
- Bowling: Right-arm medium pace

Domestic team information
- Years: Team
- 1992–1994: Somerset

Career statistics
Competition	FC	LA
Matches	4	16
Runs scored	124	159
Batting average	62.00	14.45
100s/50s	0/1	0/1
Top score	51*	55*
Balls bowled	344	540
Wickets	5	10
Bowling average	37.40	45.00
5 wickets in innings	0	0
10 wickets in match	0	n/a
Best bowling	2/15	4/37
Catches/stumpings	2/–	2/–
- Source: CricketArchive, 22 December 2015

Andrew Payne (born 20 October 1973) is an English all-round cricketer who played first-class and List A matches for Somerset between 1992 and 1994. Payne fathered his only child Tom Payne in 2002. He was born in Rossendale Valley, Lancashire.

Payne, an opening bowler and middle-order batsman, was on the books of Lancashire as a teenager but was released without making a first-class appearance. He played for England under-19s in international matches and was signed by Somerset, for whom he made regular senior appearances in two years on the county's books.

Upon release Payne returned to his native Lancashire to be a club professional. He played for Baxenden in 1995, and subsequently signed for Flowery Field Cricket Club in the Saddleworth League for four seasons, in which he scored over 4000 runs and took nearly 400 wickets.

After leaving Flowery Field he returned to his Lancashire League cricket at his home club, Rawtenstall, where he had made his debut in 1989. In 2012, Andrew retired from cricket.
