= Matthew Cleal =

English cricketer

Personal information
- Full name: Matthew William Cleal
- Born: 23 July 1969 (age 57); Yeovil, Somerset, England
- Batting: Right-handed
- Bowling: Right-arm medium-fast
- Role: All-rounder

Domestic team information
- Years: Team
- 1988–1991: Somerset
- First-class debut: 14 May 1988 Somerset v West Indians
- Last First-class: 16 September 1989 Somerset v Warwickshire
- List A debut: 7 August 1988 Somerset v Derbyshire
- Last List A: 7 May 1991 Somerset v Essex

Career statistics
Competition	First-class	List A
Matches	15	17
Runs scored	165	103
Batting average	9.16	17.16
100s/50s	–/–	–/–
Top score	30	25
Balls bowled	1582	534
Wickets	26	5
Bowling average	34.96	92.60
5 wickets in innings	–	–
10 wickets in match	–	–
Best bowling	4/41	1/14
Catches/stumpings	4/–	1/–
- Source: CricketArchive, 6 March 2011

Matthew William Cleal (born 23 July 1969) played first-class and List A cricket for Somerset from 1988 to 1991. He was born at Yeovil, Somerset.

Cleal was a right-handed lower-order batsman and a right-arm medium-fast bowler who, with his links to club cricket in Yeovil, was inevitably compared in his brief first-class cricket career to Ian Botham, though his bowling was not as fast. He played for Somerset's second eleven in 1987 and made his first-class debut in the match against the West Indians at Taunton in May 1988, taking four wickets for 41 runs in the touring side's first innings. These remained his best first-class bowling figures, though he played eight further matches in 1988 and six more in 1989 for Somerset. As a batsman, his best first-class score came in 1989, with an innings of 30 in the match against Leicestershire and a share of a last-wicket partnership of 70 with Adrian Jones, whose unbeaten 43 was also his highest first-class score. Two seasons, though, were the limit of his first-class career, which was ended by back injury.

In List A cricket, he was able to play longer, turning out for Somerset in a few games each season until 1991. He was not successful as a one-day bowler, taking only five wickets in 17 matches and never more than one in any innings.

His career ended by his back injury, Cleal returned to education, took both school and university examinations and qualified as a schoolmaster. In 2011 he was on the staff of Malvern College. Cleal's cheerfulness in adversity brought a warm tribute from his former Somerset captain, Peter Roebuck, who wrote: "Cleal was a young all-rounder from Yeovil whose career would be cut short by a back injury. Having left school early with a chequered report, he had put all his eggs in the cricketing basket. Not until bad luck befell him did his true character emerge. Undaunted, he went back to school, studied alongside boys five years younger than he was, passed his exams, advanced to college, took his degree and proceeded with a master's course which was passed with flying colours....As a cricketer he had his days, once winning a match at Old Trafford with a straight six. As his character inspires warmth, so his achievements command respect."
