= Paul Bird (cricketer) =

English cricketer

Personal information
- Full name: Paul James Bird
- Born: 7 May 1971 (age 55); Bristol, England
- Batting: Right-handed
- Bowling: Right-arm fast-medium

Domestic team information
- Years: Team
- 1994: Somerset

Career statistics
Competition	FC	LA
Matches	2	5
Runs scored	12	4
Batting average	6.00	4.00
100s/50s	0/0	0/0
Top score	7	4
Balls bowled	269	168
Wickets	0	3
Bowling average	–	43.00
5 wickets in innings	–	0
10 wickets in match	–	n/a
Best bowling	0/3	1/18
Catches/stumpings	0/–	2/–
- Source: CricketArchive, 22 December 2015

Paul James Bird (born 7 May 1971) played first-class and List A cricket for Somerset in 1994. He was born in Bristol.

Bird was a tail-end right-handed batsman and a right-arm fast-medium bowler. Before turning professional Bird played club cricket for Optimists CC (now known as Bristol CC) where he was one of the opening bowlers for the Optimists CC team that won the National Knockout Cup final at Lords in 1992, finishing the final with figures of 0/25 from 9 overs. After appearing in one second eleven match for Gloucestershire, he joined Somerset's staff for the 1994 season.

In his first season in professional cricket, Bird made a greater impact in one day cricket than in first-class cricket. His first wicket for the Somerset first XI was clean bowling Brian Lara in a List A match in early May which was screened live on BBC2. He played in five List A games during his first season - going at a miserly 4.5 runs an over in those games. He also played in 12 county second XI matches for Somerset over the course of the 1994 season, taking 39 wickets at an average of 22.92 and helping Somerset win the Second XI championship.

Bird signed a new two-year contract with Somerset at the end of the 1994 season - as ten other players were released from the playing staff. With a much smaller first eleven squad and having been promised a long run in the first team, Bird then had to retire from professional cricket in June in the 1995 season with a serious shoulder injury just as his career was taking off.

He played for McKinnon Cricket Club in Melbourne, Australia in 1993 and 1995 – winning their bowler of the year both seasons.

Bird played club cricket for Chippenham CC in the West of England Premier League (WEPL) division one in 1999 and 2000. He played for Claverham CC, in Somerset, from 2001 to 2018 and helped them win the WEPL league (the Bristol and Somerset League) in 2004 and 2015. He retired from playing cricket at the end of the 2018 season.

Bird has two children, Alice and Harry, both of whom also play cricket. Alice has played for Somerset Women and Gloucestershire Women.

Paul worked in sales and marketing for Imperial Tobacco for 20 years and for 9 years he owned the Cuban Cigar Specialist 'Birds of Baldwin Street' in the city centre of Bristol.

He worked as cricket and coaching development manager, and as a coach, for Weston-super-Mare CC during the 2023 season.
