= Geoff Clayton =

English cricketer (1938–2018)

Personal information
- Full name: Geoffrey Clayton
- Born: 3 February 1938; Mossley, England
- Died: 19 September 2018 (aged 80); Delph, England
- Nickname: Chimp
- Batting: Right-handed
- Role: Wicket-keeper

Domestic team information
- Years: Team
- 1959–1964: Lancashire
- 1965–1967: Somerset
- FC debut: 19 June 1957 Combined Services v Worcestershire
- Last FC: 8 September 1967 Somerset v Lancashire
- LA debut: 1 May 1963 Lancashire v Leicestershire
- Last LA: 2 September 1967 Somerset v Kent

Career statistics
Competition	First-class	List A
Matches	274	19
Runs scored	6,154	145
Batting average	17.63	14.50
100s/50s	1/25	0/0
Top score	106	35
Catches/stumpings	605/65	27/2
- Source: CricketArchive, 19 May 2010

Geoffrey Clayton (3 February 1938 – 19 September 2018) was an English professional first-class and List A cricketer for Lancashire and Somerset between 1959 and 1967. He was a lower-order batsman and a wicketkeeper.

Clayton was a regular first-team player in every season in which he played first-class cricket and he was at or near to the top of the wicketkeepers' lists for most dismissals each year. But his abrasive personality did not endear him to county committees – or to his county captain at Somerset – and he left first-class cricket at the age of 29.

He died on 19 September 2018, in Delph.

== Lancashire cricketer ==
Clayton played for Lancashire's second eleven in 1956 and 1957, but made his first-class cricket debut in the 1957 for the Combined Services cricket team while on national service. On discharge, he returned to Lancashire and was brought into the first team at the start of June 1959, remaining then as first-choice wicketkeeper until he left the county at the end of the 1964 season. In his first innings for the county side, he top-scored with 43. In his third County Championship match, against Middlesex at Liverpool, he scored an unbeaten 74. The batting was a bonus: Lancashire's previous first-choice wicketkeeper, Alan Wilson, had a career batting average of less than six runs per innings. But Clayton in his first full season averaged more than 24, and though he did not sustain this, and the 74* remained his highest score until 1963, he batted for most of his career at No 7 or No 8. Clayton's arrival was noted by Wisden Cricketers' Almanack's 1960 edition: "In the sturdily built Clayton, Lancashire discovered a wicketkeeper of real promise and lively character," it wrote.

Clayton was awarded his county cap in 1960, when he made 89 dismissals – his 76 catches for the county were a Lancashire record. It could have been more, but he was dropped for the final three matches of the season, and Wisden in 1961 mentioned this as part of a short list of "perplexing" events indicating disharmony at Lancashire. Unlike Jack Dyson, who was sacked, and Alan Wharton, who moved to Leicestershire, Clayton was back for a full season in 1961, playing in 37 first-class matches in the season, though this was one of his less successful seasons as wicketkeeper. He was back to form in 1962 and with 92 dismissals, this was his best season in first-class cricket. The 86 catches for Lancashire that season remain the county record.

The 1963 season proved to be Clayton's best with the bat: he scored 894 runs in all matches at an average of 22.92. And, sent in as a nightwatchman in the match against Sussex at Hove he made 84, the highest score of his Lancashire career. But the following season, 1964, the discord at Lancashire resurfaced and at the end of the season Clayton was not re-engaged. The club issued a statement: "The committee have reviewed the performance of the team both on and off the field during the current season in conjunction with a special report which had been called for. A firm decision was taken not to re-engage P. Marner and G. Clayton on the grounds that their retention was not in the best interests of the playing staff or the club." During the 1964 Gillette cup tie against Warwickshire, in protest at the opposition's ultra defensive field placements he decided to block out, eking out 19 runs in 20 overs and leaving Lancashire well short of the target. There were protests from Lancashire supporters, described as a minor riot when they gathered in front of the pavilion calling for Clayton's head.

Dyson, who had returned after being sacked in 1960, was also not re-engaged, and Ken Grieves was replaced as captain. Though much of the county committee was then replaced in the end of year election, Clayton was not reinstated and had in any case by then joined Somerset.

== Somerset cricketer ==
Clayton's arrival at Somerset was itself controversial. Harold Stephenson had been first-choice wicketkeeper since 1949 and captain since 1960, and though he was injured for much of the 1964 season he appears to have expected to continue in both roles. But Somerset's committee offered the captaincy to Colin Atkinson and recruited Clayton as wicketkeeper.

The move was initially successful. "Clayton demonstrated that he is among the three or four best keepers in the country," Wisden wrote. "His 85 victims came only one short of the county record held by Harold Stephenson." Moreover, in just his fourth match for his new county, against Middlesex at the Imperial Ground, Bristol, he was sent in again as nightwatchman and this time made 106, the only century of his first-class career. The batting of the rest of his Somerset career never reached such heights again, but he was awarded his county cap in his first season and the following year, 1966, with just one fewer dismissal, he was the leading wicketkeeper in the English season.

The record in his first two Somerset seasons made his departure at the end of his third surprising. Wisden noted: "The wicketkeeping of Clayton, although he was never dropped from the side, deteriorated sufficiently to decide the Executive not to offer him a further contract." In fact, with 74 dismissals, he was third in the fielding statistics lists for the season. And he retained his place in the side right through to Somerset's first appearance in a one-day final at Lord's in the 1967 Gillette Cup.

There appear to have been other factors: David Foot, the Somerset County Cricket Club historian, wrote of Clayton that "he never quite integrated". In a later co-authored book, Foot wrote: "He rarely courted popularity and certainly antagonised some by the cussed individuality of his personality. He was never one to kowtow; team-mates and observers detected the chip that was reluctant to leave his shoulder. He was in the modern idiom, his own man. Colin Atkinson claimed he was once so annoyed by Clayton's go-slow attitude in a match that he threatened to send him off. In spite of all that, he was as all the players readily acknowledged a fine wicketkeeper."

After playing in the final County Championship match of the 1967 season, four days after the Gillette Cup final, Clayton left the Somerset staff and did not appear in first-class cricket again.
