= Mark Davis (English cricketer) =

English cricketer

Personal information
- Full name: Mark Richard Davis
- Born: 26 February 1962 (age 64); Kilve, Somerset, England
- Batting: Left-handed
- Bowling: Left arm fast-medium
- Role: Bowler

Domestic team information
- Years: Team
- 1982–1987: Somerset
- 1989: Wiltshire

Career statistics
Competition	First-class	List A
Matches	77	63
Runs scored	803	162
Batting average	14.60	8.52
100s/50s	0/1	0/0
Top score	60*	28
Balls bowled	9,442	2,811
Wickets	149	54
Bowling average	35.62	34.92
5 wickets in innings	4	0
10 wickets in match	1	n/a
Best bowling	7/55	3/21
Catches/stumpings	29/–	16/–
- Source: Cricket Archive, 27 April 2012

Mark Richard Davis (born 26 February 1962 in Kilve, Somerset) is a former professional cricketer, who represented Somerset County Cricket Club in 77 first-class matches and 59 List A matches between 1982 and 1987. A left arm fast-medium bowler and left-handed batsmen, his ability was brought to the attention of Somerset after winning a competition set-up by the Somerset County Gazette to find a fast bowler. Before making his full debut for Somerset he represented Wiltshire, a minor county side. During his career he took 149 first-class wickets at an average of 35.62 and a best performance of 7 for 55. He averaged 14.60 with the bat with a solitary first-class fifty, 60 not out.

After retiring in 1989 he became a builder for a short period before training to become a cricket coach. In 1996 he joined Millfield School and has remained as the head coach there working alongside Richard Ellison. Recently he has joined the cricket commentary team on BBC Radio Bristol and works as the on-air analyst.
