= Somerset County Cricket Club in 2012 =

Somerset County Cricket Club
2012 season
- Coach: Andy Hurry
- Captain: Marcus Trescothick
- Overseas player: Vernon Philander; Abdur Rehman; Richard Levi (T20); Albie Morkel (T20)
- County Championship: Division One, 2nd
- Clydesdale Bank 40: Group B, 3rd
- Friends Life t20: Semi-finalists
- Most runs: Nick Compton (1,427)
- Most wickets: Peter Trego (50)
- Most catches: Marcus Trescothick (26)
- Most wicket-keeping dismissals: Craig Kieswetter (29)

The 2012 season saw Somerset County Cricket Club competing in three domestic competitions; the first division of the County Championship in which despite the squad being ravaged with injuries they finished as runners-up, the Clydesdale Bank 40 but a poor start meant they finished third in their group, and the county reached the semi-finals of the Friends Life t20.

== Squad ==
The following players made at least one appearance for Somerset in First-class, List A or Twenty20 cricket in 2012. Age given is at the start of Somerset's first match of the season (31 March 2012).

Name	Nationality	Birth date	Batting style	Bowling style	Notes	Ref
Batsmen
Alex Barrow	England	6 May 1992 (aged 19)	Right-handed	Right arm medium, off break		
Nick Compton	England	26 June 1983 (aged 28)	Right-handed	Right arm off break		
James Hildreth	England	9 September 1984 (aged 27)	Right-handed	Right arm medium-fast		
Chris Jones	England	5 November 1990 (aged 21)	Right-handed	Right arm off break		
Richard Levi	South Africa	15 January 1988 (aged 24)	Right-handed	Right arm medium	Overseas player (FLt20 only)	
Marcus Trescothick	England	25 December 1975 (aged 36)	Left-handed	Right arm medium	Club captain	
All-rounders
James Burke	England	25 January 1991 (aged 21)	Right-handed	Right arm medium-fast	Non-contracted player	
Lewis Gregory	England	24 May 1992 (aged 19)	Right-handed	Right arm fast-medium		
Craig Meschede	England	21 November 1991 (aged 20)	Right-handed	Right arm medium-fast		
Albie Morkel	South Africa	10 June 1981 (aged 30)	Left-handed	Right arm medium-fast	Overseas player (FLt20 only)	
Kevin O'Brien	Ireland	4 March 1984 (aged 28)	Right-handed	Right arm medium-fast	FLt20 only	
Craig Overton	England	10 April 1994 (aged 17)	Right-handed	Right arm medium-fast	Academy player	
Vernon Philander	South Africa	24 June 1985 (aged 26)	Right-handed	Right arm fast-medium	Overseas player	
Arul Suppiah	Malaysia	30 August 1983 (aged 28)	Right-handed	Slow left-arm orthodox		
Alfonso Thomas	South Africa	9 February 1977 (aged 35)	Right-handed	Right arm fast-medium	Kolpak registration; vice-captain	
Peter Trego	England	12 June 1981 (aged 30)	Right-handed	Right arm medium		
Wicket-keepers
Jos Buttler	England	8 September 1990 (aged 21)	Right-handed	—		
Craig Kieswetter	England	28 November 1987 (aged 24)	Right-handed	Right arm slow		
James Regan	England	30 May 1994 (aged 17)	Right-handed	—	Academy player	
Steve Snell	England	27 February 1983 (aged 29)	Right-handed	—		
Bowlers
Abdur Rehman	Pakistan	1 March 1980 (aged 32)	Left-handed	Slow left-arm orthodox	Overseas player	
Adam Dibble	England	9 March 1991 (aged 21)	Right-handed	Right arm medium-fast		
George Dockrell	Ireland	22 July 1992 (aged 19)	Right-handed	Slow left-arm orthodox		
Gemaal Hussain	England	10 October 1983 (aged 28)	Right-handed	Right arm medium		
Steve Kirby	England	4 October 1977 (aged 34)	Right-handed	Right arm fast-medium		
Jack Leach	England	22 June 1991 (aged 20)	Left-handed	Slow left-arm orthodox		
Sajid Mahmood	England	21 December 1981 (aged 30)	Right-handed	Right arm fast-medium	On loan from Lancashire	
Robert Mutch	South Africa	3 September 1984 (aged 27)	Left-handed	Left arm medium-fast		
Jamie Overton	England	10 April 1994 (aged 17)	Right-handed	Right arm fast-medium	Academy player	
Andy Sutton	England	29 November 1985 (aged 26)	Right-handed	Right arm medium-fast	Non-contracted player	
Max Waller	England	3 March 1988 (aged 24)	Right-handed	Right arm leg break		

== Pre-season ==
=== Match log ===
Match type	Date	Opponents	Venue	Result	Ref
Two-day	19–20 March	Glamorgan	County Ground, Taunton	Lost by 10 wickets	
Two-day	22–23 March	Worcestershire	County Ground, Taunton	Drawn	
40-over	26 March	Surrey	County Ground, Taunton	Won by 50 runs	
Three-day	27–29 March	Surrey	County Ground, Taunton	Won by 288 runs	
First-class	31 March - 2 April	Cardiff MCCU	Taunton Vale, Taunton	Drawn	

== County Championship ==
=== Season standings ===
Note: Pld = Played, W = Wins, L = Losses, D = Draws, T = Ties, A = Abandonments, Bat = Batting points, Bwl = Bowling points, Adj = Adjustments/Penalties, Pts = Points.

County Championship: Division One
Team	Pld	W	L	D	T	A	Bat	Bwl	Adj	Pts
Warwickshire (C)	16	6	1	9	0	0	43	45	0	211
Somerset	16	5	1	10	0	0	32	45	0	187
Middlesex	16	5	4	7	0	0	33	38	0	172
Sussex	16	5	5	6	0	0	28	41	0	167
Nottinghamshire	16	4	2	10	0	0	26	43	0	163
Durham	16	5	5	5	0	1	18	45	-4	157
Surrey	16	3	4	8	0	1	26	40	-2	139
Lancashire (R)	16	1	5	10	0	0	25	35	0	106
Worcestershire (R)	16	1	8	7	0	0	17	42	0	96
Source: CricketArchive

=== Match log ===
No.	Date	Opponents	Venue	Result	Ref
1	5–8 April	Middlesex	County Ground, Taunton	Won by 6 wickets	
2	12–15 April	Warwickshire	Edgbaston, Birmingham	Lost by 2 wickets	
3	19–22 April	Nottinghamshire	Trent Bridge, Nottingham	Drawn	
4	26–29 April	Lancashire	County Ground, Taunton	Drawn	
5	9–12 May	Durham	Riverside Ground, Chester-le-Street	Drawn	
6	16–19 May	Surrey	The Oval, London	Drawn	
7	22–24 May	Durham	County Ground, Taunton	Won by 5 wickets	
8	30 May - 2 June	Worcestershire	New Road, Worcester	Drawn	
9	5–8 June	Middlesex	Lord's, London	Drawn	
10	18–21 July	Warwickshire	County Ground, Taunton	Won by 1 wicket	
11	1–4 August	Lancashire	Aigburth, Liverpool	Drawn	
12	7–10 August	Nottinghamshire	County Ground, Taunton	Drawn	
13	21–24 August	Sussex	County Ground, Taunton	Drawn	
14	28–31 August	Surrey	County Ground, Taunton	Drawn	
15	4–7 September	Sussex	County Ground, Hove	Won by 5 wickets	
16	11–13 September	Worcestershire	County Ground, Taunton	Won by an innings and 148 runs	

=== Batting averages ===
Player	Matches	Innings	Runs	Average	Highest score	100s	50s
Nick Compton	11	18	1,191	99.25	204*	4	7
Craig Kieswetter	11	17	654	50.30	152	1	2
James Hildreth	16	25	946	43.00	120	3	5
Marcus Trescothick	9	13	506	38.92	146	2	1
Peter Trego	16	21	600	33.33	92	0	4
Arul Suppiah	16	25	728	29.12	124	2	5
Qualification: 450 runs. Source: Cricinfo

=== Bowling averages ===
Player	Matches	Innings	Wickets	Average	BBI	BBM	5wi	10wm
Abdur Rehman	4	8	27	14.18	9/65	14/101	3	1
Vernon Philander	5	9	23	21.34	5/43	7/81	2	0
Alfonso Thomas	9	16	33	22.42	6/60	9/108	2	0
George Dockrell	10	16	34	27.92	6/27	8/62	2	0
Gemaal Hussain	5	8	12	29.41	5/48	5/118	1	0
Craig Overton	7	9	12	30.25	4/38	6/87	0	0
Steve Kirby	9	18	24	30.62	3/34	4/73	0	0
Peter Trego	16	30	50	31.08	5/53	7/115	2	0
Craig Meschede	6	10	10	35.00	3/26	6/64	0	0
Qualification: 10 wickets. Source: Cricinfo

== Clydesdale Bank 40 ==
=== Season standings ===
Note: Pld = Played, W = Wins, L = Losses, T = Ties, NR = No result, Pts = Points, NRR = Net run rate.

Clydesdale Bank 40: Group B
Team	Pld	W	L	T	NR	Pts	Net R/R
Hampshire Royals*	12	7	3	0	2	16	+0.754
Surrey Lions†	12	6	3	0	3	15	+0.466
Somerset†	12	6	4	0	2	14	+0.385
Nottinghamshire Outlaws†	12	6	5	0	1	13	+0.101
Durham Dynamos†	12	5	5	0	2	12	+0.262
Welsh Dragons†	12	3	6	0	3	9	-0.971
Scottish Saltires†	12	1	8	0	3	5	-1.359
Teams marked * progressed to the next stage of the competition. Team marked † were eliminated from the competition. Source: Cricinfo

=== Match logs ===
No.	Stage	Date	Opponents	Venue	Result	Ref
1	Group B	4 May	Surrey	The Oval, London	Lost by 105 runs	
2	Group B	13 May	Durham	Riverside Ground, Chester-le-Street	Lost by 14 runs	
3	Group B	27 May	Hampshire	County Ground, Taunton	Lost by 9 wickets	
4	Group B	4 June	Nottinghamshire	Trent Bridge, Nottingham	Lost by 5 wickets	
5	Group B	12 July	Glamorgan	SWALEC Stadium, Cardiff	No Result: Match abandoned without a ball bowled due to rain	
6	Group B	15 July	Scotland	County Ground, Taunton	Won by 60 runs	
7	Group B	22 July	Durham	County Ground, Taunton	Won by 8 wickets	
8	Group B	28 July	Glamorgan	County Ground, Taunton	Won by 3 wickets	
9	Group B	12 August	Nottinghamshire	County Ground, Taunton	Won by 5 wickets	
10	Group B	14 August	Hampshire	The Rose Bowl, Southampton	Won by 50 runs	
11	Group B	19 August	Scotland	Bothwell Castle, Uddingston	Won by 53 runs: Duckworth–Lewis method used	
12	Group B	27 August	Surrey	County Ground, Taunton	No Result: Match abandoned after 4.3 overs of the first innings due to rain	

=== Batting averages ===
Player	Matches	Innings	Runs	Average	Highest score	100s	50s
Nick Compton	6	6	237	47.40	81	0	3
Jos Buttler	10	8	289	41.28	71	0	2
Craig Kieswetter	7	7	236	33.71	103	1	1
Peter Trego	11	9	245	27.22	81	0	2
Qualification: 200 runs. Source: Cricinfo

=== Bowling averages ===
Player	Matches	Overs	Wickets	Average	Economy	BBI	4wi
Steve Kirby	6	40.3	8	21.87	4.32	3/19	0
Craig Meschede	6	35.0	9	22.00	5.65	4/27	1
Peter Trego	11	61.4	15	24.80	6.03	3/26	0
Max Waller	6	34.0	4	45.00	5.29	2/29	0
Qualification: 30 overs. Source: Cricinfo

== Friends Life t20 ==
=== Season standings ===
Note: Pld = Played, W = Wins, L = Losses, T = Ties, NR = No result, Pts = Points, NRR = Net run rate.

Friends Life t20: Midlands/Wales/West Division
Team	Pld	W	L	T	NR	Pts	NRR
Somerset*	10	5	2	0	3	13	+0.275
Gloucestershire Gladiators*	10	4	2	0	4	12	+0.248
Worcestershire Royals*	10	4	3	0	3	11	+0.578
Warwickshire Bears†	10	4	3	0	3	11	-0.033
Welsh Dragons†	10	2	3	0	5	9	-0.708
Northamptonshire Steelbacks†	10	1	7	0	2	4	-0.611
Teams marked * progressed to the next stage of the competition. Team marked † were eliminated from the competition. Source: Cricinfo

=== Knockout stages ===
Quarter-finals
N2	Nottinghamshire Outlaws	178/7
S2	Hampshire Royals	182/6
M1	Somerset	175/6
S3	Essex Eagles	148
S1	Sussex Sharks	230/4
M2	Gloucestershire Gladiators	191/8
N1	Yorkshire Carnegie	212/5
M3	Worcestershire Royals	183/6

Semi-finals
S2	Hampshire Royals	126/4
M1	Somerset	125/6
S1	Sussex Sharks	136/8
N1	Yorkshire Carnegie	172/6

Final
S2	Hampshire Royals	150/6
N1	Yorkshire Carnegie	140/8

=== Match logs ===
No.	Stage	Date	Opponents	Venue	Result	Ref
1	Midlands/Wales/West Division	13 June	Warwickshire	County Ground, Taunton	Won by 63 runs	
2	Midlands/Wales/West Division	14 June	Gloucestershire	County Ground, Bristol	No Result: Match abandoned without a ball bowled due to rain	
3	Midlands/Wales/West Division	17 June	Northamptonshire	County Ground, Taunton	Won by 5 wickets	
4	Midlands/Wales/West Division	21 June	Warwickshire	Edgbaston, Birmingham	No Result: Rain stopped play after 7.1 overs of the first innings	
5	Midlands/Wales/West Division	22 June	Glamorgan	County Ground, Taunton	Won by 4 wickets	
6	Midlands/Wales/West Division	26 June	Northamptonshire	County Ground, Northampton	Won by 7 wickets	
7	Midlands/Wales/West Division	29 June	Gloucestershire	County Ground, Taunton	Lost by 9 wickets	
8	Midlands/Wales/West Division	1 July	Worcestershire	County Ground, Taunton	Lost by 54 runs	
9	Midlands/Wales/West Division	6 July	Glamorgan	SWALEC Stadium, Cardiff	No Result: Match abandoned without a ball bowled due to rain	
10	Midlands/Wales/West Division	8 July	Worcestershire	New Road, Worcester	Won by 7 wickets	
11	Quarter-final	24 July	Essex	County Ground, Taunton	Won by 27 runs	
12	Semi-final	25 August	Hampshire	SWALEC Stadium, Cardiff	Lost by 6 wickets	

=== Batting averages ===
Player	Matches	Innings	Runs	Average	Strike rate	Highest score	50s
Craig Kieswetter	4	4	134	44.66	120.72	63*	2
James Hildreth	9	8	223	44.60	135.33	107*	2
Jos Buttler	10	9	195	27.85	116.07	58*	1
Richard Levi	7	7	179	25.57	161.26	69	1
Nick Compton	8	7	120	24.00	97.56	42	0
Qualification: 100 runs. Source: Cricinfo

=== Bowling averages ===
Player	Matches	Overs	Wickets	Average	Economy	BBI	4wi
Steve Kirby	8	26.4	8	21.37	6.41	3/37	0
George Dockrell	7	26.0	9	18.77	6.50	2/17	0
Lewis Gregory	7	17.3	6	20.00	6.85	4/39	1
Max Waller	7	21.0	7	21.14	7.04	4/16	1
Alfonso Thomas	10	33.0	8	35.25	8.54	3/17	0
Qualification: 15 overs. Source: Cricinfo

== Tourist match ==
=== Match log ===
Match type	Date	Opponents	Venue	Result	Ref
Two-day	9–10 July	South Africa	County Ground, Taunton	Drawn	

== Statistics ==
=== Batting ===
Player	First class							List A							Twenty20							
Player	Matches	Innings	Runs	Highest score	Average	100s	50s	Matches	Innings	Runs	Highest score	Average	100s	50s	Matches	Innings	Runs	Highest score	Average	Strike rate	100s	50s
Batsmen
AWR Barrow	9	15	186	47	12.40	0	0	5	3	108	72	54.00	0	1								
NRD Compton	11	18	1,427	236	109.76	5	7	6	6	237	81	47.40	0	3	8	7	120	42*	24.00	97.56	0	0
JC Hildreth	17	26	1,214	268	52.78	4	5	11	10	102	26	12.75	0	0	9	8	223	107*	44.60	133.53	1	1
CR Jones	5	7	150	50	21.42	0	1	3	2	48	24	24.00	0	0								
RE Levi															7	7	179	69	25.57	161.26	0	1
ME Trescothick	9	13	506	146	38.92	2	1	5	4	118	87*	39.33	0	1	2	2	31	19	15.50	140.90	0	0
All-rounders
JE Burke	1	0																				
L Gregory	4	4	40	18	10.00	0	0	10	6	103	39	17.16	0	0	7	5	83	22	27.66	127.69	0	0
CAJ Meschede	7	6	172	62	28.66	0	1	6	5	102	33	25.50	0	0	3	3	19	19*	9.50	118.75	0	0
JA Morkel															5	4	81	38	20.25	112.50	0	0
KJ O'Brien															6	4	52	22	17.33	101.96	0	0
C Overton	7	8	75	50	10.71	0	1	2	2	25	20	12.50	0	0								
VD Philander	5	6	62	38	10.33	0	0															
AV Suppiah	17	26	769	124	29.57	2	5	7	7	144	56	24.00	0	1	7	5	55	18	18.33	114.58	0	0
AC Thomas	9	11	96	39*	9.60	0	0	5	3	23	16*	23.00	0	0	10	3	28	11*	28.00	93.33	0	0
PD Trego	17	22	630	92	35.00	0	4	11	9	245	81	27.22	0	2	8	8	52	16	7.42	67.53	0	0
Wicket-keepers
JC Buttler	12	16	400	93	26.66	0	2	10	8	289	71	41.28	0	2	10	9	195	58*	27.85	116.07	0	1
C Kieswetter	11	17	654	152	50.30	1	2	7	7	236	103	33.71	1	1	4	4	134	51	44.66	120.72	0	2
JA Regan	1	0																				
SD Snell	2	2	18	10	9.00	0	0								2	1	4	4	4.00	100.00	0	0
Bowlers
Abdur Rehman	4	5	43	17	8.60	0	0	3	2	17	9	8.50	0	0								
AJ Dibble	1	2	44	43	22.00	0	0															
GH Dockrell	11	10	54	13*	9.00	0	0	6	4	21	18	7.00	0	0	7	2	2	1*	2.00	22.22	0	0
GM Hussain	6	7	55	29	18.33	0	0	3	2	19	18*	–	0	0								
SP Kirby	9	11	20	6*	3.33	0	0	6	0						8	1	4	4*	–	400.00	0	0
MJ Leach	2	1	0	0*	–	0	0	3	1	2	2	2.00	0	0								
SI Mahmood	3	4	25	13	8.33	0	0															
RG Mutch								1	0													
J Overton	3	4	55	34*	27.50	0	0	3	3	19	10	19.00	0	0								
AP Sutton	1	0																				
MTC Waller	3	3	24	17	8.00	0	0	8	4	30	13	10.00	0	0	7	0						
Source: CricInfo

=== Bowling ===
Player	First class								List A							Twenty20						
Player	Matches	Overs	Wickets	Average	BBI	BBM	5wi	10wi	Matches	Overs	Wickets	Average	Economy	BBI	4wi	Matches	Overs	Wickets	Average	Economy	BBI	4wi
Abdur Rehman	4	174.0	27	14.18	9/65	14/101	3	1	3	20.5	9	8.11	3.50	6/16	1							
JE Burke	1	18.0	2	34.00	2/51	2/68	0	0														
JC Buttler	12	2.0	0	–	–	–	0	0														
AJ Dibble	1	13.0	3	14.00	3/42	3/42	0	0														
GH Dockrell	11	340.5	35	28.45	6/27	8/62	2	0	6	28.0	2	84.00	6.00	2/32	0	7	26.0	9	18.77	6.50	2/17	0
L Gregory	4	24.0	4	31.75	2/22	2/22	0	0	10	28.4	6	32.50	6.80	2/25	0	7	17.3	6	20.00	6.85	4/39	1
JC Hildreth	17	2.0	0	–	–	–	0	0														
GM Hussain	6	101.4	13	29.61	5/48	5/118	1	0	3	18.2	4	26.00	5.67	2/29	0							
CR Jones	5	2.0	1	17.00	1/17	1/17	0	0														
C Kieswetter	11	3.0	2	1.50	2/3	2/3	0	0	7	2.0	1	19.00	9.50	1/19	0							
SP Kirby	9	225.1	24	30.62	3/34	4/73	0	0	6	40.3	8	21.87	4.32	3/19	0	8	26.4	8	21.37	6.41	3/37	0
MJ Leach	2	20.0	2	21.50	2/37	2/39	0	0	3	19.0	1	90.00	4.73	1/30	0							
SI Mahmood	3	66.1	8	30.12	4/62	6/107	0	0														
CAJ Meschede	7	119.0	12	34.83	3/26	6/64	0	0	6	35.0	9	22.00	5.65	4/27	1	3	4.0	0	–	9.75	–	0
JA Morkel																5	11.5	5	17.80	7.52	3/30	0
RG Mutch									1	8.0	2	23.00	5.75	2/46	0							
KJ O'Brien																6	8.0	1	63.00	7.87	1/15	0
C Overton	7	113.1	12	30.25	4/38	6/87	0	0	2	11.0	1	72.00	6.54	1/35	0							
J Overton	3	66.0	6	38.16	2/61	3/106	0	0	2	12.0	4	18.50	6.16	4/42	1							
VD Philander	5	181.1	23	21.34	5/43	7/81	2	0														
AV Suppiah	17	80.0	3	77.33	1/8	2/41	0	0	7	18.0	2	49.50	5.50	1/32	0	7	12.0	4	22.00	7.33	2/10	0
AP Sutton	1	30.0	2	49.50	1/31	2/99	0	0														
AC Thomas	9	252.4	33	22.42	6/60	9/108	2	0	5	27.0	5	22.40	4.14	2/13	0	10	33.0	8	35.25	8.54	3/17	0
PD Trego	17	523.5	50	32.18	5/53	7/115	2	0	11	61.4	15	24.80	6.03	3/26	0	8	11.0	2	36.00	6.54	2/23	0
MTC Waller	3	52.0	4	36.25	3/33	3/62	0	0	8	34.0	4	45.00	5.29	2/29	0	7	21.0	7	21.14	7.04	4/16	1
Source: CricInfo

=== Fielding ===
Player	First class			List A			Twenty20		
Player	Matches	Innings	Catches	Matches	Innings	Catches	Matches	Innings	Catches
Abdur Rehman	3	7	1						
AWR Barrow	9	17	14	5	5	2			
JC Buttler	12	16	6	10	5	1	10	5	3
NRD Compton	11	21	8	6	6	1	8	7	2
GH Dockrell	11	20	5	6	6	3	7	7	4
L Gregory				10	10	3			
JC Hildreth	16	31	17	11	11	4	9	8	3
CR Jones	5	10	2						
SP Kirby	9	18	4	6	6	1			
RE Levi							7	7	3
SI Mahmood	3	6	1						
CAJ Meschede	7	13	3	6	6	2	3	2	1
JA Morkel							5	5	1
KJ O'Brien							6	6	4
C Overton	7	12	4	2	2	3			
J Overton	3	6	1						
VD Philander	5	9	2						
AV Suppiah	17	32	9	7	7	3	7	6	1
AC Thomas	9	17	1				10	9	3
ME Trescothick	9	18	26	5	5	5	2	2	1
PD Trego	17	32	13	11	11	3	8	7	4
MTC Waller	3	6	4	8	8	5	7	6	4
Source: CricInfo

=== Wicket-keeping ===
Player	First class				List A				Twenty20			
Player	Matches	Innings	Catches	Stumpings	Matches	Innings	Catches	Stumpings	Matches	Innings	Catches	Stumpings
JC Buttler	12	6	6	1	10	5	3	0	10	4	2	1
C Kieswetter	11	20	28	1	7	6	7	0	4	4	0	3
JA Regan	1	2	0	0								
SD Snell	2	4	8	0					2	1	0	0
Source: CricInfo
