= List of Somerset County Cricket Club Twenty20 players =

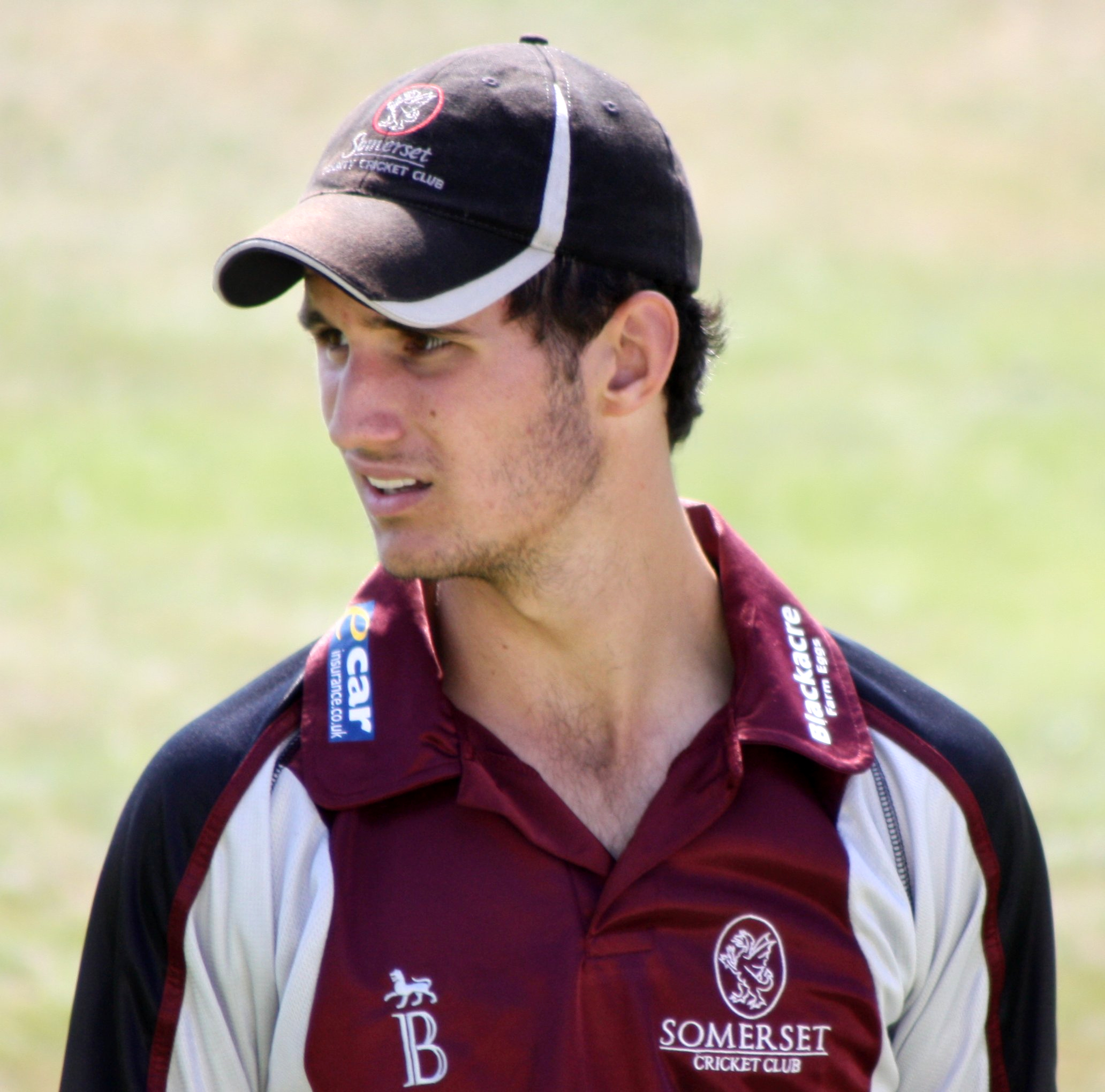
Lewis Gregory is Somerset's leading wicket taker in Twenty20 cricket with 169 wickets.

Somerset County Cricket Club was formed in 1875 and became a first-class county in 1882. They played their first Twenty20 match in the 2003 Twenty20 Cup against Warwickshire. Somerset have reached the domestic Twenty20 competition final on eight occasions: the club has won the 2005 Twenty20 Cup, 2023 T20 Blast and 2025 T20 Blast, and were runners-up in three consecutive seasons: 2009, 2010 and 2011. Their performances in the competition have resulted in their qualification for the 2009 and 2011 Champions League Twenty20 competitions, and an invitation to participate in the 2010–11 Caribbean Twenty20. In total, 121 players have appeared in Twenty20 cricket for Somerset, of whom James Hildreth has played the most matches: 206 spread over 19 seasons between 2004 and 2022.

Hildreth is Somerset's leading run-scorer in Twenty20 cricket, aggregating 3,906 runs. He is also one of only ten batsmen to have scored a century for Somerset in the format, along with Tom Abell, Babar Azam, Tom Banton, Chris Gayle, Johann Myburgh, James Rew, Graeme Smith, Marcus Trescothick and Cameron White. Gayle's score of 151 not out, scored in 2015 against Kent is the highest score by a Somerset batsman, and Gayle also has the county's best batting average: 84.16. Among the bowlers, Lewis Gregory has taken more wickets than any other bowler, both claiming 169, 30 more than Max Waller. The best bowling average is Matt Henry's 14.72. Arul Suppiah has the best bowling figures in an innings: he claimed six wickets against Glamorgan in a 2011 match, while only conceding five runs. Suppiah's figures in that match were the best by any bowler in Twenty20 cricket at the time. Tom Banton has taken the most catches as wicket-keeper for Somerset, with 51, and Craig Kieswetter has made the highest number of stumpings: 14. Craig Overton has claimed the highest number of catches among fielders, taking 95.

Players are initially listed in order of appearance; where players made their debut in the same match, they are initially listed by batting order.

== Key ==
General

- † – Wicket-keeper
- First – Year of Twenty20 debut for Somerset
- Last – Year of latest Twenty20 match for Somerset
- Mat – Number of Twenty20 appearances for Somerset

Batting

- Runs – Runs scored in career
- HS – Highest score
- Avg – Runs scored per dismissal
- * – Batsman remained not out

Bowling

- Balls – Balls bowled in career
- Wkt – Wickets taken in career
- BBI – Best bowling in an innings
- Ave – Average runs per wicket

Fielding

- Ca – Catches taken
- St – Stumpings effected
All statistics correct as of the end of the English 2026 cricket season.

== List of players ==
Somerset County Cricket Club Twenty20 players
No.	Name	Nationality	First	Last	Mat	Runs	HS	Avg	Balls	Wkt	BBI	Ave	Ca	St	Ref(s)
No.	Name	Nationality	First	Last	Mat	Batting			Bowling				Fielding		Ref(s)
1	Jamie Cox	Australia	2003	2004	7	139	53	23.16	0	–	–	–	2	0	
2	Carl Gazzard †	England	2003	2007	27	221	39	17.00	0	–	–	–	14	6	
3	Ian Blackwell	England	2003	2008	30	498	82	20.75	577	23	4/26	30.17	10	0	
4	Keith Dutch	England	2003	2004	10	291	70	32.33	132	5	2/14	32.80	3	0	
5	Mike Burns †	England	2003	2004	9	108	36	15.42	36	2	1/15	27.50	3	0	
6	Wes Durston	England	2003	2009	38	386	57	16.78	214	17	3/25	19.88	14	0	
7	Keith Parsons	England	2003	2007	31	464	57*	20.17	338	18	3/12	25.94	9	0	
8	Aaron Laraman	England	2003	2004	7	35	28*	8.75	123	9	4/15	16.77	0	0	
9	Robert Turner †	England	2003	2005	6	25	11	5.00	0	–	–	–	3	0	
10	Steffan Jones	England	2003	2008	12	47	24*	15.66	242	9	3/27	42.00	2	0	
11	Simon Francis	England	2003	2006	20	31	9*	6.20	360	10	2/22	59.80	4	0	
12	Gareth Andrew	England	2003	2007	30	71	12*	7.10	535	28	4/22	27.85	9	0	
13	James Bryant	South Africa	2003	2003	1	0	0	0.00	0	–	–	–	0	0	
14	Neil Edwards	England	2003	2003	1	1	1	1.00	0	–	–	–	0	0	
15	James Hildreth	England	2004	2022	206	3,906	107*	24.56	169	10	3/24	24.70	73	0	
16	John Francis	England	2004	2007	14	271	49	27.10	0	–	–	–	1	0	
17	Neil Hancock	Australia	2004	2004	2	9	7	4.50	12	1	1/9	25.00	0	0	
18	Thos Hunt	Australia	2004	2004	3	6	4	3.00	24	0	–	–	0	0	
19	Matthew Wood	England	2004	2007	29	859	94	29.62	0	–	–	–	5	0	
20	Marcus Trescothick †	England	2004	2015	86	2,197	108*	27.81	0	–	–	–	27	0	
21	Ricky Ponting	Australia	2004	2004	1	20	20	20.00	0	–	–	–	0	0	
22	Graeme Smith	South Africa	2005	2005	11	380	105	38.00	12	0	–	–	18	0	
23	Michael Parsons	England	2005	2005	1	0	0	0.00	24	0	–	–	0	0	
24	Arul Suppiah	Malaysia	2005	2012	82	473	32*	13.13	647	41	6/5	19.14	33	0	
25	Andy Caddick	England	2005	2007	16	0	0	0.00	306	15	2/12	31.20	1	0	
26	Charl Langeveldt	South Africa	2005	2005	3	0	0*	–	60	0	–	–	2	0	
27	Richard Johnson	England	2005	2006	9	24	10	6.00	198	14	3/21	19.92	1	0	
28	Robert Woodman	England	2005	2005	2	1	1*	–	42	2	2/37	31.50	0	0	
29	Sam Spurway †	England	2005	2005	1	15	15*	–	0	–	–	–	0	0	
30	Justin Langer	Australia	2006	2009	40	1,014	97	28.97	0	–	–	–	8	0	
31	Cameron White	Australia	2006	2007	16	593	141*	45.61	160	8	3/16	28.12	3	0	
32	Charl Willoughby	South Africa	2006	2011	34	10	4	3.33	744	39	4/29	25.20	4	0	
33	Peter Trego	England	2006	2019	164	3,273	94*	24.42	1,187	50	2/16	32.16	47	0	
34	Craig Kieswetter †	England	2007	2014	77	2,202	89*	34.95	0	–	–	–	45	14	
35	Mark Turner	England	2007	2010	32	25	11*	4.16	552	30	3/25	27.06	6	0	
36	Omari Banks	West Indies	2008	2009	7	106	50*	35.33	120	5	1/14	32.00	1	0	
37	Alfonso Thomas	South Africa	2008	2015	104	189	30*	14.53	2,162	137	4/27	20.17	33	0	
38	Ben Phillips	England	2008	2010	34	101	26	6.73	678	29	3/31	31.65	9	0	
39	Zander de Bruyn	South Africa	2008	2010	39	798	95*	34.69	264	14	2/2	28.00	12	0	
40	Max Waller	England	2009	2022	144	106	17	7.06	2,774	139	4/16	24.44	86	0	
41	Jos Buttler †	England	2009	2013	65	1,012	72*	25.30	0	–	–	–	45	10	
42	Nick Compton	England	2010	2014	43	706	74	22.77	0	–	–	–	12	0	
43	Murali Kartik	India	2010	2011	40	81	25*	16.20	840	34	3/18	26.79	9	0	
44	Kieron Pollard	West Indies	2010	2011	28	588	89*	34.58	575	41	4/15	18.56	17	0	
45	Craig Meschede	Germany	2011	2014	39	328	53	15.61	385	21	3/9	26.52	7	0	
46	Calum Haggett	England	2011	2011	3	3	2	1.50	30	1	1/15	32.00	0	0	
47	Gemaal Hussain	England	2011	2011	7	7	4	2.33	126	9	3/40	16.55	1	0	
48	Steve Kirby	England	2011	2013	39	15	7	5.00	713	34	3/26	25.73	4	0	
49	George Dockrell	Ireland	2011	2014	22	2	1*	2.00	398	19	2/15	27.00	14	0	
50	Roelof van der Merwe	Netherlands (Note: Van der Merwe has also played international cricket for South Africa.)	2011	2024	121	1,213	89*	25.80	2,315	100	5/32	30.18	64	0	
51	Lewis Gregory	England	2011	2026	170	2,192	62	22.83	2,823	169	5/24	24.60	75	0	
52	Chris Jones	England	2011	2014	13	217	53*	19.72	0	–	–	–	6	0	
53	Steve Snell †	England	2011	2012	5	48	34*	24.00	0	–	–	–	0	0	
54	Adam Dibble	England	2011	2011	2	–	–	–	48	2	1/20	22.00	0	0	
55	Richard Levi	South Africa	2012	2012	7	179	69	25.57	0	–	–	–	3	0	
56	Albie Morkel	South Africa	2012	2012	5	81	38	20.25	71	5	3/30	17.80	1	0	
57	Kevin O'Brien	Ireland	2012	2012	6	52	22	17.33	48	1	1/15	63.00	4	0	
58	Alviro Petersen	South Africa	2013	2014	13	316	64*	35.11	0	–	–	–	2	0	
59	Yasir Arafat	Pakistan	2013	2016	16	36	12*	36.00	360	23	4/5	21.60	0	0	
60	Dirk Nannes	Australia	2014	2014	14	4	4*	–	279	24	5/31	15.54	2	0	
61	Craig Overton	England	2014	2026	121	675	79*	19.28	2,395	117	4/25	28.85	95	0	
62	Johann Myburgh	South Africa	2014	2018	47	1,087	103*	28.60	42	1	1/5	49.00	10	0	
63	James Burke	England	2014	2014	3	4	4	4.00	0	–	–	–	0	0	
64	Tim Groenewald	South Africa	2014	2019	34	70	27*	6.36	614	28	3/27	31.42	6	0	
65	Colin Ingram	South Africa	2014	2014	4	95	37*	31.66	0	–	–	–	2	0	
66	Jim Allenby	Australia	2015	2017	38	779	91	23.60	276	8	3/10	48.12	9	0	
67	Tom Cooper	Netherlands	2015	2015	12	242	84*	26.88	0	–	–	–	6	0	
68	Sohail Tanvir	Pakistan	2015	2015	6	17	13	4.25	132	7	2/38	25.42	0	0	
69	Abdur Rehman	Pakistan	2015	2015	6	57	30*	28.50	114	2	1/18	76.50	2	0	
70	Jamie Overton	England	2015	2020	42	142	31	10.92	817	45	5/47	30.04	17	0	
71	Chris Gayle	West Indies	2015	2016	8	505	151*	84.16	0	–	–	–	3	0	
72	Michael Bates †	England	2015	2015	2	–	–	–	0	–	–	–	2	0	
73	Luke Ronchi †	New Zealand	2015	2015	5	89	49	22.25	0	–	–	–	1	1	
74	Adam Hose	England	2015	2017	7	117	59	19.50	0	–	–	–	1	0	
75	Michael Leask	Scotland	2016	2017	9	52	13	8.66	18	1	1/11	23.00	2	0	
76	Ryan Davies †	England	2016	2016	12	14	5	2.33	0	–	–	–	4	3	
77	Mahela Jayawardene	Sri Lanka	2016	2016	10	239	51	26.55	0	–	–	–	1	0	
78	Alex Barrow †	England	2016	2016	1	17	17*	–	0	–	–	–	0	0	
79	Josh Davey	Scotland	2016	2025	52	162	23*	40.50	980	74	4/34	20.10	16	0	
80	Tim Rouse	England	2016	2016	1	9	9	9.00	0	–	–	–	1	0	
81	Paul van Meekeren	Netherlands	2016	2017	7	4	1	1.00	116	3	1/23	60.33	3	0	
82	Tom Abell	England	2016	2026	117	2,658	101*	31.64	20	0	–	–	78	0	
83	Ben Green	England	2016	2025	85	774	47	20.91	1,407	103	5/29	21.29	25	0	
84	Dom Bess	England	2016	2016	1	1	1	1.00	24	1	1/31	31.00	0	0	
85	Ollie Sale	England	2016	2020	10	20	14*	10.00	196	13	3/32	26.23	3	0	
86	Steven Davies †	England	2017	2021	37	633	62	17.58	0	–	–	–	14	5	
87	Corey Anderson	United States (Note: Anderson has also played international cricket for New Zealand.)	2017	2018	20	656	81	46.85	30	1	1/11	46.00	3	0	
88	Tom Banton †	England	2017	2026	94	2,614	107*	30.39	0	–	–	–	53	7	
89	Dean Elgar	South Africa	2017	2017	2	49	25	24.50	0	–	–	–	2	0	
90	Jerome Taylor	West Indies	2018	2019	24	39	19*	39.00	509	36	5/15	21.69	4	0	
91	Babar Azam	Pakistan	2019	2020	20	796	114*	46.82	0	–	–	–	11	0	
92	Tom Lammonby	England	2019	2026	61	858	90	20.92	306	14	2/32	33.64	35	0	
93	Eddie Byrom	Zimbabwe	2019	2021	18	269	54*	17.93	0	–	–	–	4	0	
94	George Bartlett	England	2020	2022	8	148	82*	21.14	0	–	–	–	2	0	
95	Will Smeed	England	2020	2026	91	2,683	98	31.19	0	–	–	–	42	0	
96	Lewis Goldsworthy	England	2020	2026	55	397	48	18.04	852	44	4/13	26.54	13	0	
97	Marchant de Lange	South Africa	2021	2022	20	63	20	10.50	408	26	4/9	22.50	6	0	
98	Jack Brooks	England	2021	2023	18	18	10*	9.00	361	19	3/35	26.15	3	0	
99	Jack Leach	England	2021	2026	11	12	8*	12.00	216	17	3/20	17.94	4	0	
100	Devon Conway †	New Zealand	2021	2021	8	309	81*	61.80	0	–	–	–	5	0	
101	Rilee Rossouw	South Africa	2022	2022	16	623	93	47.92	0	–	–	–	11	0	
102	James Rew †	England	2022	2026	19	596	116*	37.25	0	–	–	–	7	0	
103	Kasey Aldridge	England	2022	2023	5	43	32*	–	18	0	–	–	2	0	
104	Ned Leonard	England	2022	2022	1	–	–	–	12	1	1/8	8.00	0	0	
105	Peter Siddle	Australia	2022	2023	18	22	11*	7.33	353	24	3/10	21.16	1	0	
106	Tom Kohler-Cadmore †	England	2023	2026	58	1,568	90	30.15	0	–	–	–	34	2	
107	Matt Henry	New Zealand	2023	2025	24	53	14*	13.25	542	47	4/21	14.72	15	0	
108	Sean Dickson	South Africa	2023	2025	41	1,007	78	38.73	0	–	–	–	26	0	
109	Shoaib Bashir	England	2023	2023	5	–	–	–	66	4	3/26	23.50	1	0	
110	Ish Sodhi	New Zealand	2023	2023	5	2	2	2.00	120	8	3/22	17.37	1	0	
111	Jake Ball	England	2024	2026	31	8	8	2.66	614	40	4/17	23.05	11	0	
112	Riley Meredith	Australia	2024	2026	34	22	6*	7.33	738	56	4/12	17.94	6	0	
113	Sonny Baker	England	2024	2024	1	–	–	–	24	1	1/44	44.00	1	0	
114	George Thomas	England	2024	2024	4	127	42	31.75	0	–	–	–	1	0	
115	Migael Pretorius	South Africa	2024	2025	4	14	12*	14.00	71	6	3/27	17.00	1	0	
116	Thomas Rew †	England	2025	2026	17	273	57	21.00	0	–	–	–	12	1	
117	Daniel Sams	Australia	2026	2026	14	143	48*	17.87	278	20	3/16	19.15	5	0	
118	Josh Thomas	England	2026	2026	7	69	21	13.80	36	5	4/6	7.80	3	0	
119	Josh Shaw	England	2026	2026	7	22	14*	–	93	4	2/14	42.00	2	0	
120	Jordan Hermann	South Africa	2026	2026	3	105	90*	52.50	0	–	–	–	1	0	
121	Alfie Ogborne	England	2026	2026	2	4	4	4.00	36	1	1/37	63.00	1	0	
