= Somerset County Cricket Club in 2011 =

Somerset County Cricket Club
2011 season
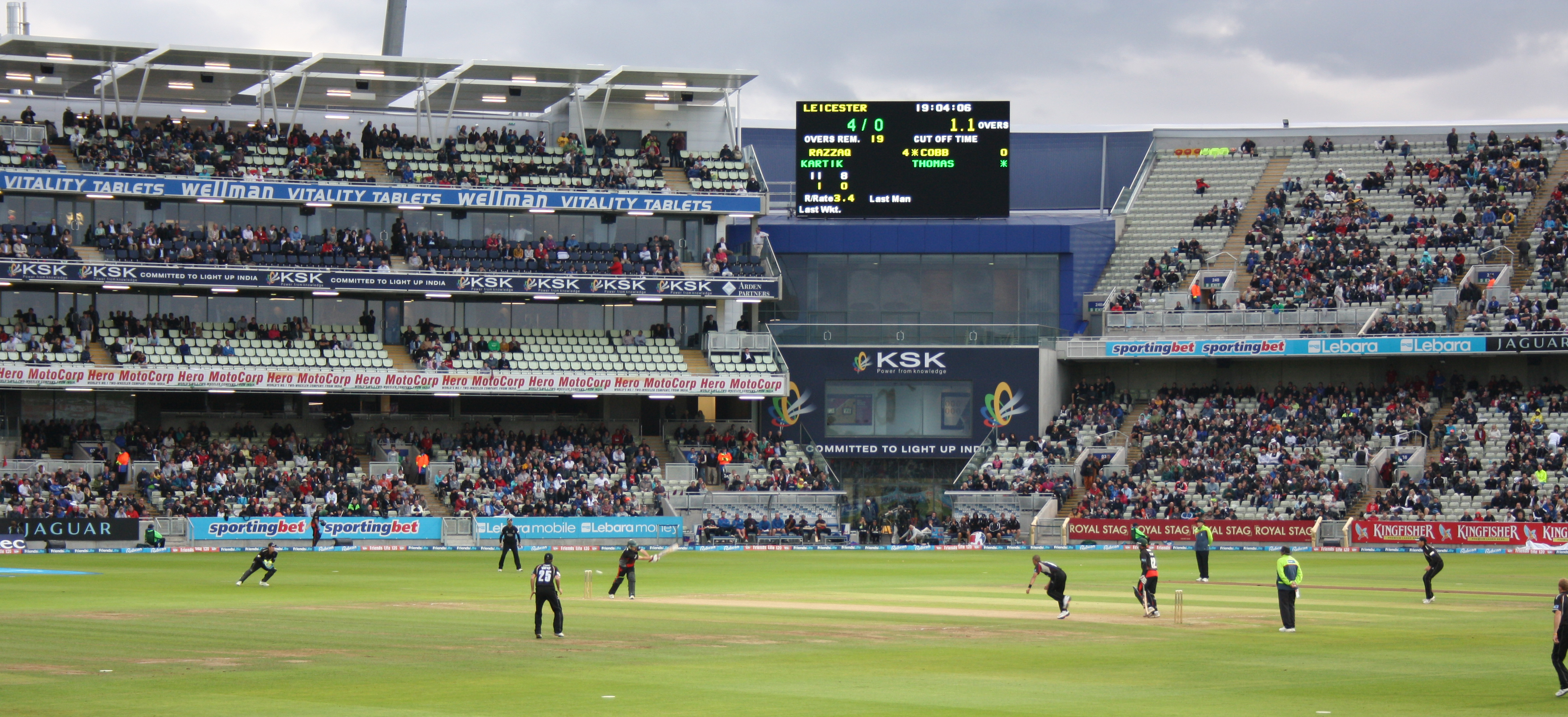
- Somerset reached their third consecutive Twenty20 final.
- Coach: Andy Hurry
- Captain: Marcus Trescothick
- Overseas player: Murali Kartik; Ajantha Mendis; Kieron Pollard (T20); Roelof van der Merwe (T20)
- County Championship: Division One, 4th
- Clydesdale Bank 40: Runners-up
- Friends Life t20: Runners-up
- Caribbean Twenty20: Group stage
- Champions League Twenty20: Semi-finalists
- Most runs: Marcus Trescothick (1,673)
- Most wickets: Steve Kirby (53)
- Most catches: Marcus Trescothick (28)
- Most wicket-keeping dismissals: Jos Buttler (29); Craig Kieswetter (29)

The 2011 season saw Somerset County Cricket Club competing in three domestic competitions; the first division of the County Championship in which despite being within a shout of winning the Championship with two games to go a lack of consistency cost them and they finished 4th, and reached the finals of both one day domestic competitions the Clydesdale Bank 40 and the Friends Life t20. While in international competitions they failed to make it past the group stage in the Caribbean Twenty20 but impressed in the Champions League Twenty20 reaching the semi-finals.

They were captained for the second season by former England international, Marcus Trescothick, who topped the batting table scoring over 2,500 runs saw him named as both Professional Cricketers' Association (PCA) Player of the Year and the PCA's Most Valuable Player of the Year.

== Background ==
The 2010 season yet again saw Somerset fall short in all domestic competitions finishing runners-up in each including finishing on equal points with champions Nottinghamshire in the County Championship and losing the Twenty20 competition on losing more wickets than champions Hampshire.

Somerset started the season as many people's favourites for the County Championship title, and many praised the signings of Gemaal Hussain, Steve Kirby, Ajantha Mendis and George Dockrell. Both Hussain and Kirby signed from Gloucestershire to replace the loss of Ben Phillips to Nottinghamshire, Mark Turner to Derbyshire and Zander de Bruyn to Surrey with Michael Munday, Robin Lett and David Stiff were all released. While Mendis was brought in to cover while Murali Kartik and Alfonso Thomas are playing in the IPL both for Pune Warriors India and Kieron Pollard was brought in for the Friends Life t20 again with Roelof van der Merwe in addition for the first half of the competition while Pollard was on international duty with the West Indies. As well as these new players Alex Barrow, Calum Haggett and Craig Meschede were promoted from the club's academy and all featured in the first team as well as other débutants Adam Dibble and Lewis Gregory.

== Squad ==
The following players made at least one appearance for Somerset in first-class, List A or Twenty20 cricket in 2011. Age given is at the start of Somerset's first match of the season (14 April 2011).

Name	Nationality	Birth date	Batting style	Bowling style	Ref
Batsmen
Alex Barrow	England	6 May 1992 (aged 18)	Right-handed	Right arm medium-fast	
Nick Compton	England	26 June 1983 (aged 27)	Right-handed	Right arm off break	
James Hildreth	England	9 September 1984 (aged 26)	Right-handed	Right arm medium-fast	
Chris Jones	England	5 November 1990 (aged 20)	Right-handed	Right arm medium pace	
Andrew Strauss (Note: England Test Cricket captain Andrew Strauss featured as a guest player in Somerset's three day game against India.)	England	2 March 1977 (aged 34)	Left-handed	Left arm medium pace	
Marcus Trescothick (Captain)	England	25 December 1975 (aged 35)	Left-handed	Right arm medium pace	
All-rounders
Lewis Gregory	England	24 May 1992 (aged 18)	Right-handed	Right arm fast-medium	
Calum Haggett	England	30 October 1990 (aged 20)	Left-handed	Right arm medium pace	
Craig Meschede	England	21 November 1991 (aged 19)	Right-handed	Right arm medium-fast	
Kieron Pollard	West Indies	12 May 1987 (aged 23)	Right-handed	Right arm medium pace	
Arul Suppiah	Malaysia	30 August 1983 (aged 27)	Right-handed	Slow left-arm orthodox	
Alfonso Thomas (Vice-captain)	South Africa	9 February 1977 (aged 34)	Right-handed	Right arm fast-medium	
Peter Trego	England	12 June 1981 (aged 29)	Right-handed	Right arm medium pace	
Roelof van der Merwe	South Africa	31 December 1984 (aged 26)	Right-handed	Slow left-arm orthodox	
Wicket-keepers
Jos Buttler	England	8 September 1990 (aged 20)	Right-handed	—	
Craig Kieswetter	England	28 November 1987 (aged 23)	Right-handed	—	
Steve Snell	England	27 February 1983 (aged 28)	Right-handed	—	
Bowlers
Adam Dibble	England	9 March 1991 (aged 20)	Right-handed	Right arm medium-fast	
George Dockrell	Ireland	22 July 1992 (aged 18)	Right-handed	Slow left-arm orthodox	
Gemaal Hussain	England	10 October 1983 (aged 27)	Right-handed	Right arm medium	
Steve Kirby	England	4 October 1977 (aged 33)	Right-handed	Right arm fast-medium	
Murali Kartik	India	9 November 1976 (aged 34)	Left-handed	Slow left-arm orthodox	
Ajantha Mendis	Sri Lanka	11 March 1985 (aged 26)	Right-handed	Right-arm off break, leg break	
Max Waller	England	3 March 1988 (aged 23)	Right-handed	Right arm leg break	
Charl Willoughby	South Africa	3 December 1974 (aged 36)	Left-handed	Left arm fast-medium	

== Caribbean Twenty20 ==
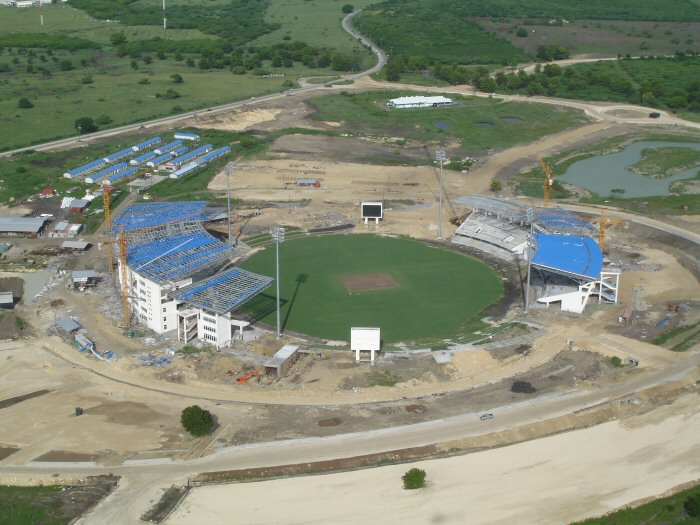
Somerset played two games at the ground named after their former star the Sir Vivian Richards Stadium.

By finishing as runners-up in the 2010 Friends Provident t20, Somerset should have qualified for the 2010 Champions League Twenty20 but no English county sides were allowed to take part due to a clash with the end of the domestic season. So both winners Hampshire and Somerset were invited to compete in the 2010–11 Caribbean Twenty20 in January 2011.

Somerset named a relatively strong side with a mixture of youth and experience but without captain Marcus Trescothick and wicketkeeper Craig Kieswetter so the side were captained by Alfonso Thomas and these missing players provided a chance for Somerset débuts for George Dockrell, Calum Haggett, Gemaal Hussain, Steve Kirby and Craig Meschede. Somerset lost their first match against Guyana, who elected to bat first but with only two batsmen scoring double figures, Somerset strangled them to just 112/8 from their 20 overs with Alfonso Thomas taking 3-23 but after cruising to 105/3 off 18 overs Somerset looked to be in total control but then collapsed to lose 7 wickets for just 6 runs and therefore lost by a single run. Their second match against the Windward Islands was more successful with an allround bowling beformance coasting to a 17 run victory, Somerset scored 139/4 with Jos Buttler top scoring with 47 and the Windward Islands finished on 122/9 with Max Waller taking 3–16. In contrast in the next game, a contest reduced to 6 overs a side due to rain Jamaica scored 85 at 14.16 an over with only Waller taking a wicket and in reply Somerset scored just 24, losing by a whopping 61 runs. In their final game with no realistic chance of qualification Somerset scored 165/4 with James Hildreth top scoring with 69 aided by Nick Compton's 44 and an 11 ball 26 from Craig Meschede and in reply Combined Campuses and Colleges were restricted to 123/7 with Steve Kirby taking 3-26.

=== Season standings ===
Note: Pld = Played, W = Wins, T = Ties, L = Losses, Pts = Points, NRR = Net run rate.

Caribbean Twenty20: Group A
Team	Pld	W	L	Pts	NRR
Windward Islands*	4	3	1	12	+0.375
Jamaica*	4	2	2	8	+1.317
Somerset^{†}	4	2	2	8	−0.045
Guyana^{†}	4	2	2	8	−0.574
Combined Campuses and Colleges^{†}	4	1	3	4	−0.840
Teams marked * progressed to the next stage of the competition. Team marked † were eliminated from the competition. Source: Cricinfo

=== Match logs ===
No.	Stage	Date	Opponents	Venue	Result	Ref
1	Group A	12 January	Guyana	Sir Vivian Richards Stadium, North Sound, Antigua	Lost by 1 run	
2	Group A	14 January	Windward Islands	Sir Vivian Richards Stadium, North Sound, Antigua	Won by 17 runs	
3	Group A	18 January	Jamaica	Kensington Oval, Bridgetown, Barbados	Lost by 61 runs	
4	Group A	20 January	Combined Campuses and Colleges	Kensington Oval, Bridgetown, Barbados	Won by 42 runs	

=== Batting averages ===
Player	Matches	Innings	Runs	Average	Strike rate	Highest score	50s
James Hildreth	4	4	93	31.00	93.00	69*	1
Craig Meschede	4	4	55	27.50	141.02	28*	0
Nick Compton	4	4	95	23.75	91.34	44	0
Jos Buttler	4	4	74	18.50	121.31	47	0
Arul Suppiah	4	4	50	12.50	106.38	26	0
Qualification: 50 runs. Source: CricInfo

=== Bowling averages ===
Player	Matches	Overs	Wickets	Average	Economy	BBI	4wi
George Dockrell	4	11.0	4	13.75	5.00	2/15	0
Max Waller	4	10.0	5	11.60	5.80	3/16	0
Gemaal Hussain	4	12.0	4	17.75	5.91	2/19	0
Alfonso Thomas	4	13.0	5	17.00	6.53	3/23	0
Steve Kirby	4	13.0	5	19.80	7.61	3/26	0
Qualification: 10 overs. Source: CricInfo

== County Championship ==
=== Season standings ===
Note: Pld = Played, W = Wins, L = Losses, D = Draws, T = Ties, A = Abandonments, Bat = Batting points, Bwl = Bowling points, Adj = Adjustments/Penalties, Pts = Points.

County Championship: Division One
Team	Pld	W	L	D	T	A	Bat	Bwl	Adj	Pts
Lancashire (C)	16	10	4	2	0	0	37	44	-1	246
Warwickshire	16	9	4	3	0	0	46	45	-9	235
Durham	16	8	4	4	0	0	47	45	0	232
Somerset	16	6	7	3	0	0	45	39	0	189
Sussex	16	6	6	4	0	0	34	40	0	182
Nottinghamshire	16	5	6	5	0	0	35	43	0	173
Worcestershire	16	4	11	1	0	0	31	44	0	142
Yorkshire (R)	16	3	6	7	0	0	34	37	-2	138
Hampshire (R)	16	3	6	7	0	0	30	36	-8	127
Source: CricketArchive

=== Match log ===
No.	Date	Opponents	Venue	Result	Ref
1	14–16 April	Warwickshire	County Ground, Taunton	Lost by an innings and 382 runs	
2	20–22 April	Lancashire	Aigburth, Liverpool	Lost by an innings and 20 runs	
3	27–30 April	Hampshire	The Rose Bowl, Southampton	Won by 9 wickets	
4	4–6 May	Worcestershire	County Ground, Taunton	Won by 91 runs	
5	10–13 May	Durham	Riverside, Chester-le-Street	Drawn	
6	18–21 May	Sussex	County Ground, Hove	Lost by 8 wickets	
7	24–27 May	Yorkshire	County Ground, Taunton	Won by 10 wickets	
8	20–23 June	Warwickshire	Edgbaston, Birmingham	Lost by 10 wickets	
9	11–14 July	Nottinghamshire	Trent Bridge, Nottingham	Drawn	
10	21–24 July	Durham	County Ground, Taunton	Won by 9 wickets	
11	26–29 July	Worcestershire	New Road, Worcester	Won by an innings and 8 runs	
12	2–4 August	Sussex	County Ground, Taunton	Won by 9 wickets	
13	17–20 August	Nottinghamshire	County Ground, Taunton	Drawn	
14	31 August - 3 September	Hampshire	County Ground, Taunton	Lost by an innings and 61 runs	
15	7–10 September	Yorkshire	Headingley, Leeds	Lost by 6 wickets	
16	12–15 September	Lancashire	County Ground, Taunton	Lost by 8 wickets	

=== Batting averages ===
Player	Matches	Innings	Runs	Average	Highest score	100s	50s
Marcus Trescothick	13	23	1,673	79.66	227	6	6
Nick Compton	13	22	1,010	56.11	254*	2	5
Craig Kieswetter	9	14	572	40.85	164	2	3
James Hildreth	15	23	893	38.82	186	2	4
Jos Buttler	12	18	524	30.82	100	1	3
Arul Suppiah	16	29	760	29.23	95	0	6
Peter Trego	16	25	591	28.14	120	1	3
Qualification: 450 runs. Source: Cricinfo

=== Bowling averages ===
Player	Matches	Innings	Wickets	Average	BBI	BBM	5wi	10wm
Alfonso Thomas	7	12	32	23.50	6/60	10/88	2	1
Steve Kirby	16	27	53	31.54	6/115	6/115	1	0
Murali Kartik	8	13	26	34.34	5/137	6/109	1	0
Charl Willoughby	14	24	47	34.65	4/40	5/111	0	0
Peter Trego	16	26	27	38.48	4/22	7/93	0	0
Arul Suppiah	16	18	10	44.70	2/16	2/16	0	0
Gemaal Hussain	9	14	22	44.86	6/33	6/70	1	0
Qualification: 10 wickets. Source: Cricinfo

== Clydesdale Bank 40 ==
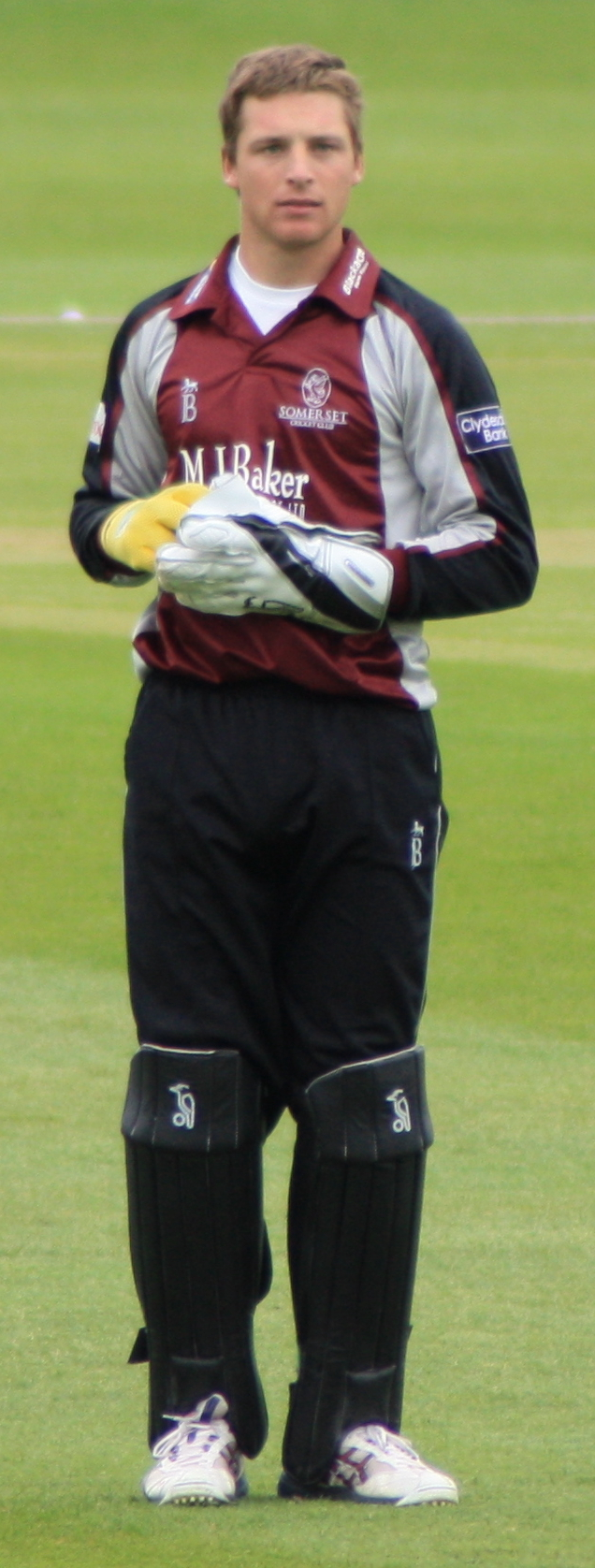
Jos Buttler scored 411 runs in the competition at an average of 137.00 at a strike rate of over 130.

The 2011 Clydesdale Bank 40 saw Somerset finish as runners-up to Surrey in the Lord's final for the second year in succession. Somerset qualified for the semi-finals by topping their qualification group and securing a home semi against Durham, Somerset bowled their opponents out for just 219 and they strolled to 165 for 3 when bad weather ended the match with Somerset 39 runs ahead using Duckworth-Lewis. In the final after electing to bat, only Jos Buttler impressed with an impressive 86 dragging Somerset to a below par total of 214 all out, and after a few rain breaks Surrey required 186 from 30 overs and reached that total with 15 balls and 5 wickets to spare.

=== Season standings ===
Note: Pld = Played, W = Wins, L = Losses, T = Ties, NR = No result, Pts = Points, NRR = Net run rate.

Clydesdale Bank 40: Group C
Team	Pld	W	L	T	NR	Pts	Net R/R
Somerset*	12	9	2	0	1	19	+1.008
Nottinghamshire Outlaws^{†}	12	7	4	0	1	15	+0.260
Essex Eagles^{†}	12	6	3	0	3	15	+0.255
Lancashire Lightning^{†}	12	6	5	0	1	13	-0.172
Glamorgan Dragons^{†}	12	4	5	0	3	11	+0.161
Gloucestershire Gladiators^{†}	12	4	8	0	0	8	-0.488
Unicorns^{†}	12	1	10	0	1	3	-0.640
Teams marked * progressed to the next stage of the competition. Team marked † were eliminated from the competition. Source: Cricinfo

=== Knockout stages ===
Semifinals
C1	Somerset (D/L)	165/3
B2	Durham Dynamos	219
B1	Surrey Lions	228/7
A1	Sussex Sharks	157

Final
C1	Somerset	214
B1	Surrey Lions (D/L)	189/5

=== Match logs ===
No.	Stage	Date	Opponents	Venue	Result	Ref
1	Group C	24 April	Nottinghamshire	Trent Bridge, Nottingham	Won by 47 runs	
2	Group C	1 May	Unicorns	Sir Paul Getty's Ground, Wormsley	Won by 4 wickets	
3	Group C	2 May	Glamorgan	County Ground, Taunton	Won by 10 runs: Duckworth–Lewis method used	
4	Group C	8 May	Gloucestershire	County Ground, Taunton	Won by 8 wickets	
5	Group C	15 May	Lancashire	County Ground, Taunton	Won by 7 wickets	
6	Group C	18 July	Lancashire	Old Trafford, Manchester	No Result: Match abandoned after 7.4 overs of the first innings due to rain	
7	Group C	31 July	Essex	Garons Park, Southend-on-Sea	Won by 6 wickets	
8	Group C	14 August	Glamorgan	SWALEC Stadium, Cardiff	Lost by 3 wickets	
9	Group C	15 August	Nottinghamshire	County Ground, Taunton	Lost by 3 wickets: Duckworth–Lewis method used	
10	Group C	21 August	Unicorns	County Ground, Taunton	Won by 6 wickets	
11	Group C	24 August	Gloucestershire	County Ground, Bristol	Won by 59 runs: Duckworth–Lewis method used	
12	Group C	29 August	Essex	County Ground, Taunton	Won by 40 runs	
13	Semi-final	4 September	Durham	County Ground, Taunton	Won by 39 runs: Duckworth–Lewis method used	
14	Final	17 September	Surrey	Lord's, London	Lost by 5 wickets: Duckworth–Lewis method used	

=== Batting averages ===
Player	Matches	Innings	Runs	Average	Highest score	100s	50s
Jos Buttler	13	10	411	137.00	94*	0	4
Craig Kieswetter	10	9	399	57.00	108*	2	1
Marcus Trescothick	12	11	338	37.55	111*	1	2
Peter Trego	14	13	444	37.00	100	1	2
Qualification: 300 runs. Source: Cricinfo

=== Bowling averages ===
Player	Matches	Overs	Wickets	Average	Economy	BBI	4wi
Lewis Gregory	7	32.0	13	14.53	5.90	4/27	2
Steve Kirby	9	47.2	20	16.05	6.78	3/24	0
Arul Suppiah	14	45.3	9	23.00	4.54	2/2	0
George Dockrell	5	30.0	5	26.60	4.43	3/27	0
Peter Trego	14	60.0	10	35.50	5.91	3/33	0
Alfonso Thomas	9	48.2	7	36.00	5.21	2/36	0
Murali Kartik	5	32.0	5	38.20	5.96	2/24	0
Qualification: 30 overs. Source: Cricinfo

== Friends Life t20 ==
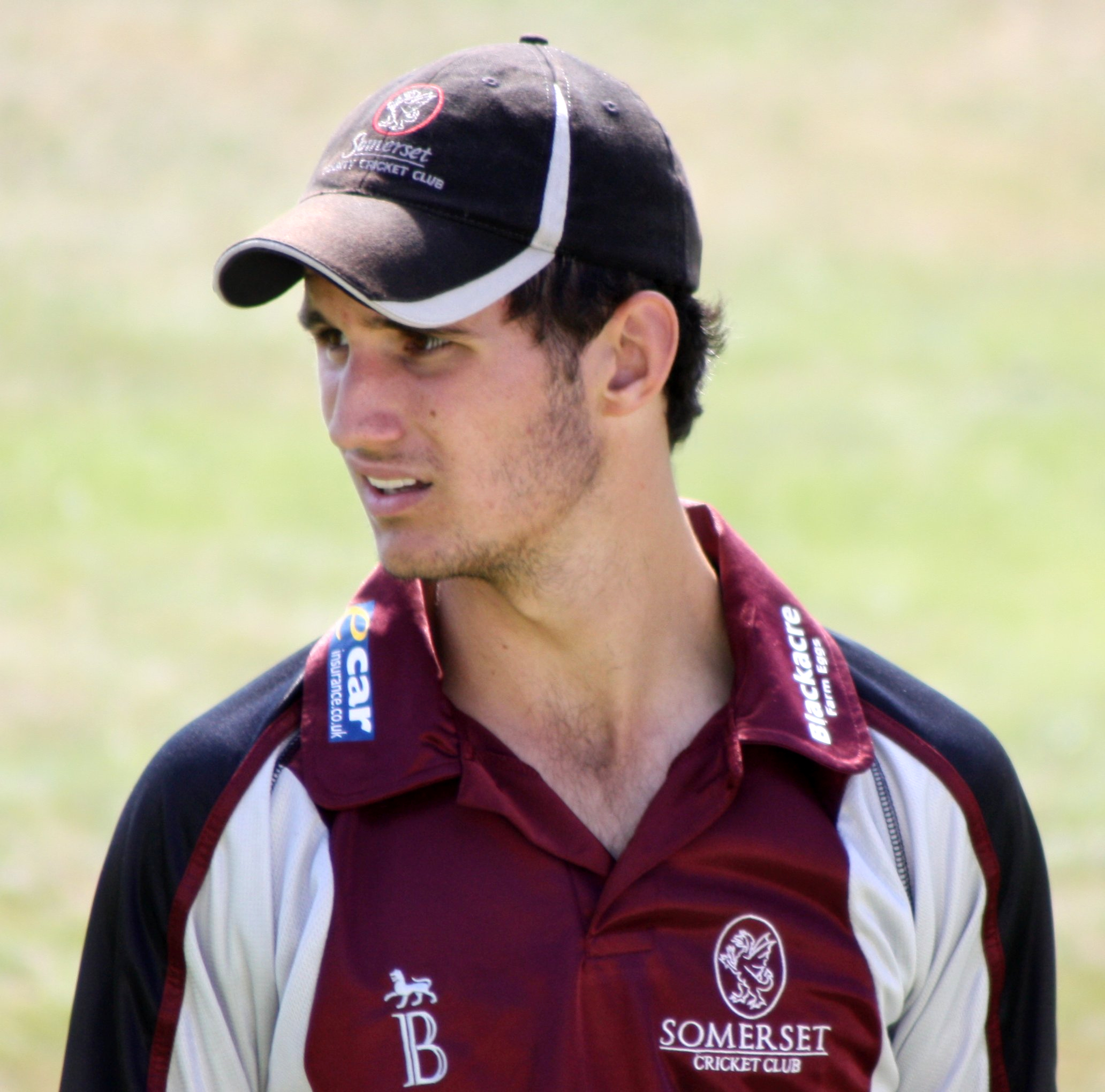
Débutant Lewis Gregory finished as Somerset's leading wicket taker in the competition with 18 wickets at an average of 17.

In the 2011 Friends Life t20 saw Somerset finish as runners-up to Leicestershire, reaching the final for the third year in succession. Somerset qualified for the knockout stage having finished fourth in their southern qualification group, to meet Nottinghamshire in the quarter-finals who they beat by five wickets to qualify for finals day. The semi-final against Hampshire was a rematch of the 2010 final and after a tied match decided using Duckworth-Lewis, Somerset won courtesy of a Super Over and reached the final against Leicestershire but despite restricting Leicestershire to 145 but the star studded batting line-up failed with only Peter Trego making 35 as Somerset lost for the third year running by 18 runs.

The season started with a rerun of the 2010 final with a match against Hampshire at the Rose Bowl, but despite a half-century from Peter Trego Somerset lost heavily by 7 wickets and although Somerset recovered with comprehensive victories over Kent and Middlesex bad weather hampered any chance of getting a run of home victories with only three out of seven matches completed at the County Ground. After a defeat away at Sussex, Marcus Trescothick scored a century in a massive 143 run victory away at Essex in one of his two man of the match performances. In Somerset's away victory at Glamorgan occasional spinner Arul Suppiah took new world record Twenty20 bowling figures of 6 for 5 in just 3.4 overs. A lack of consistency harmed Somerset's chance of a home quarter-final with the final game against Middlesex typifying their indifferent bowling where despite Middlesex needing to score 18 off the final over, Somerset failed to win and so finished fourth in the South Division.

Somerset were drawn away at Trent Bridge against Nottinghamshire in the quarter-finals, Notts won the toss and elected to bat and scored an impressive total of 170 with Alex Hales top scoring with 78, Somerset started their innings slowly and it seemed they wouldn't get anywhere near their target and needed 64 off the final 31 deliveries but with Kieron Pollard and Jos Buttler at the crease they crossed the line with five balls remaining. That victory meant a third successive finals day and a rematch with Hampshire yet again and with bad weather looming Somerset won the toss and elected to field first hoping to take advantage of batting second with the Duckworth–Lewis method. Expensive bowling from the spinners and Pollard, Hampshire reached 138 off 15.5 overs propelled by 80 off just 41 balls from Shahid Afridi, with rain ending their innings one ball early Somerset were set a challenging 95 to win off just 10 overs and despite a cameo from Buttler Somerset fell one run short and required a Super Over to decide the match. Somerset sent in Kieswetter and Buttler for their over and scored 16 off Afridi's over and Alfonso Thomas restricted Hampshire to just 5–1 in their one over. In the final against Leicestershire, Somerset restricted them to 145 for 6, and despite no team ever having defended a lower total in an English Twenty20 final none of Somerset's batsman made a large score and they lost by 18 runs.

West Indies star Kieron Pollard returned as an overseas player but missed the first half of the Twenty20 campaign and was replaced by South African all-rounder Roelof van der Merwe.

=== Season standings ===
Note: Pld = Played, W = Wins, L = Losses, T = Ties, NR = No result, Adj = Adjustments/Penalties, Pts = Points, NRR = Net run rate.

Friends Life t20: South Division
Team	Pld	W	L	T	NR	Adj	Pts	NRR
Hampshire Royals*	16	11	2	0	3	-2	23	+1.093
Sussex Sharks*	16	9	5	0	2	0	20	+0.061
Kent Spitfires*	16	9	5	0	2	0	20	-0.205
Somerset*	16	7	4	1	4	0	19	+0.978
Surrey Lions^{†}	16	7	6	0	3	0	17	+0.131
Essex Eagles^{†}	16	7	7	0	2	0	16	-0.086
Glamorgan Dragons^{†}	16	5	9	0	2	0	12	+0.045
Gloucestershire Gladiators^{†}	16	4	11	0	1	0	9	-0.473
Middlesex Crusaders^{†}	16	2	12	1	1	0	6	-1.247
Teams marked * progressed to the next stage of the competition. Team marked † were eliminated from the competition. Source: Cricinfo

=== Knockout stages ===
Quarter-finals
N1	Nottinghamshire Outlaws	169/5
S4	Somerset	172/4
N4	Durham Dynamos	99
S1	Hampshire Royals	154/6
N2	Leicestershire Foxes	206/7
S3	Kent Spitfires	203/3
N3	Lancashire Lightning	152/8
S2	Sussex Sharks	132/8

Semifinals
S4	Somerset (D/L; Super Over)	94/5
S1	Hampshire Royals	138/4
N2	Leicestershire Foxes (D/L; Super Over)	132/6
N3	Lancashire Lightning	79/6

Final
S4	Somerset	127/9
N2	Leicestershire Foxes	145/6

=== Match logs ===
No.	Stage	Date	Opponents	Venue	Result	Ref
1	South Division	1 June	Hampshire	The Rose Bowl, Southampton	Lost by 7 wickets	
2	South Division	3 June	Kent	Nevill Ground, Royal Tunbridge Wells	Won by 9 wickets	
3	South Division	5 June	Middlesex	County Ground, Taunton	Won by 40 runs	
4	South Division	10 June	Kent	County Ground, Taunton	No Result: Match abandoned without a ball bowled due to rain	
5	South Division	12 June	Hampshire	County Ground, Taunton	No Result: Match abandoned without a ball bowled due to rain	
6	South Division	14 June	Sussex	County Cricket Ground, Hove	Lost by 4 wickets	
7	South Division	15 June	Essex	County Cricket Ground, Chelmsford	Won by 143 runs	
8	South Division	17 June	Surrey	County Ground, Taunton	No Result: Match abandoned without a ball bowled due to rain	
9	South Division	24 June	Sussex	County Ground, Taunton	No Result: Rain stopped play after 3.4 overs of the second innings	
10	South Division	26 June	Glamorgan	County Ground, Taunton	Won by 7 wickets	
11	South Division	30 June	Surrey	The Oval, London	Won by 38 runs	
12	South Division	1 July	Gloucestershire	County Cricket Ground, Bristol	Lost by 2 wickets	
13	South Division	4 July	Essex	Recreation Ground, Bath	Lost by 65 runs	
14	South Division	5 July	Glamorgan	SWALEC Stadium, Cardiff	Won by 5 wickets	
15	South Division	8 July	Gloucestershire	County Ground, Taunton	Won by 15 runs	
16	South Division	10 July	Middlesex	John Walker's Ground, Southgate, London	Match tied	
17	Quarter-final	7 August	Nottinghamshire	Trent Bridge, Nottingham	Won by 6 wickets	
17	Semi-final	27 August	Hampshire	Edgbaston, Birmingham	Scores level: Duckworth–Lewis method used; won the Super Over	
18	Final	27 August	Leicestershire	Edgbaston, Birmingham	Lost by 18 runs	

=== Batting averages ===
Player	Matches	Innings	Runs	Average	Strike rate	Highest score	50s
Roelof van der Merwe	5	4	169	56.33	169.00	89*	2
Marcus Trescothick	16	16	507	39.00	162.50	108*	4
Kieron Pollard	11	10	234	39.00	162.50	47*	0
James Hildreth	16	15	346	28.83	120.13	64*	2
Craig Kieswetter	7	7	166	23.71	137.19	59	1
Jos Buttler	16	14	259	23.54	148.00	72*	1
Peter Trego	16	16	304	20.26	122.08	55	1
Qualification: 150 runs. Source: Cricinfo

=== Bowling averages ===
Player	Matches	Overs	Wickets	Average	Economy	BBI	4wi
Arul Suppiah	16	26.4	14	10.71	5.62	6/5	1
Murali Kartik	16	56.0	17	20.76	6.30	2/7	0
Max Waller	8	22.0	9	15.55	6.36	2/20	0
Roelof van der Merwe	5	16.0	4	31.00	7.75	2/15	0
Steve Kirby	14	33.1	8	34.12	8.23	2/15	0
Lewis Gregory	12	37.0	18	17.00	8.27	4/15	1
Alfonso Thomas	5	18.5	5	32.00	8.49	2/25	0
Kieron Pollard	10	37.3	12	26.91	8.61	3/25	0
Qualification: 15 overs. Source: Cricinfo

== Champions League Twenty20 ==
By finishing as runners-up in the Friends Life t20, Somerset qualified to compete in the 2011 Champions League Twenty20, for the second time. Somerset faced squad problems in the buildup to the tournament with Marcus Trescothick no longer travelling overseas for health reasons, Kieron Pollard choosing his IPL franchise Mumbai Indians over Somerset and both wicket-keepers Jos Buttler and Craig Kieswetter missing due to international commitments for the first two matches.

=== Qualifier stage standings ===
Note: Pld = Played, W = Wins, L = Losses, NR = No result, Pts = Points, NRR = Net run rate.

Qualifying stage: Pool A
Team	Pld	W	L	NR	Pts	NRR
(England) Somerset*	2	2	0	0	4	+0.300
(India) Kolkata Knight Riders*	2	1	1	0	2	-0.225
(New Zealand) Auckland Aces†	2	0	2	0	0	-0.075
Teams marked * progressed to the next stage of the competition. Team marked † were eliminated from the competition. Source: Cricinfo

=== Group stage standings ===
Champions League Twenty20: Group B
Team	Pld	W	L	NR	Pts	NRR
(England) Somerset*	4	2	1	1	5	-0.557
(India) Royal Challengers Bangalore*	4	2	2	0	4	+0.325
(India) Kolkata Knight Riders†	4	2	2	0	4	+0.306
(South Africa) Warriors†	4	2	2	0	4	+0.246
(Australia) Southern Redbacks†	4	1	2	1	3	-0.533
Teams marked * progressed to the next stage of the competition. Team marked † were eliminated from the competition. Source: Cricinfo

=== Knockout stages ===
Semifinals
B1	New South Wales	203/2
A2	Royal Challengers	204/4
A1	Somerset	150/7
B2	Mumbai Indians	160/5

Final
A2	Royal Challengers	108
B2	Mumbai Indians	139

=== Match logs ===
No.	Stage	Date	Opponents	Venue	Result	Ref
1	Qualifier: Pool A	20 September	Auckland Aces	Rajiv Gandhi International Stadium, Uppal, Hyderabad	Won by 4 wickets	
2	Qualifier: Pool A	21 September	Kolkata Knight Riders	Rajiv Gandhi International Stadium, Uppal, Hyderabad	Won by 11 runs	
3	Group Stage: Group B	25 September	Kolkata Knight Riders	Rajiv Gandhi International Stadium, Uppal, Hyderabad	Won by 5 wickets	
4	Group Stage: Group B	1 October	Southern Redbacks	M. Chinnaswamy Stadium, Bangalore	No Result: Match abandoned without a ball bowled due to rain	
5	Group Stage: Group B	3 October	Royal Challengers Bangalore	M. Chinnaswamy Stadium, Bangalore	Lost by 51 runs	
6	Group Stage: Group B	5 October	Warriors	M. Chinnaswamy Stadium, Bangalore	Won by 12 runs	
7	Semi-final	8 October	Mumbai Indians	M. A. Chidambaram Stadium, Chepauk, Chennai	Lost by 10 runs	

=== Batting averages ===
Player	Matches	Innings	Runs	Average	Strike rate	Highest score	50s
Craig Kieswetter	4	3	144	72.00	123.07	62	2
Roelof van der Merwe	7	6	179	29.83	164.22	70	1
Peter Trego	7	6	175	29.16	106.06	70	2
James Hildreth	7	6	122	20.33	103.38	39	0
Qualification: 75 runs. Source: CricInfo

=== Bowling averages ===
Player	Matches	Overs	Wickets	Average	Economy	BBI	4wi
Murali Kartik	7	23.0	4	39.00	6.78	2/23	0
Roelof van der Merwe	7	23.0	6	27.00	7.04	2/23	0
Alfonso Thomas	7	24.0	8	21.25	7.08	2/16	0
Qualification: 15 overs. Source: CricInfo

== Tourist match ==
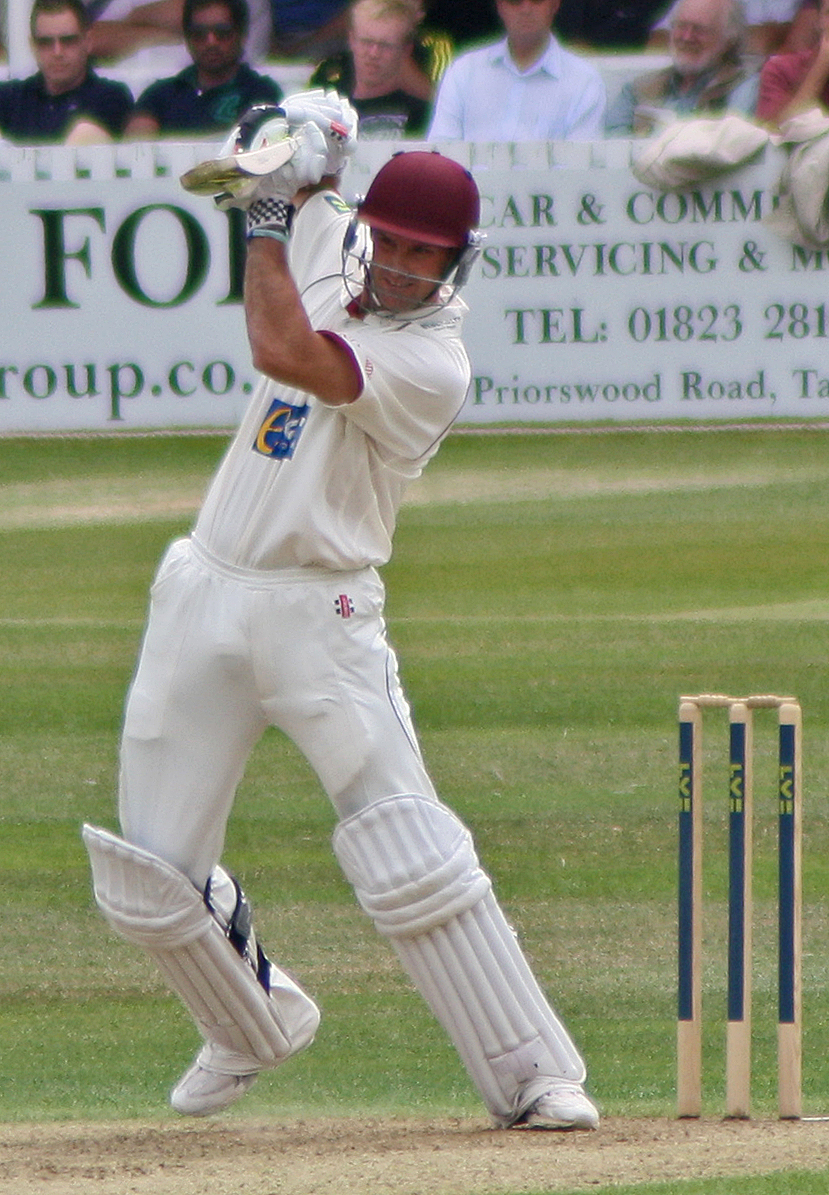
Strauss batting for Somerset.

India rested a number of their Test players for their first match of their tour; Mahendra Singh Dhoni, Ishant Sharma, Praveen Kumar and Harbhajan Singh were all left out of the team. The weakened bowling attack showed on the first day of the match, when Somerset scored 329 for the loss of two wickets from a rain-reduced 75 overs. Andrew Strauss, the England Test captain and Middlesex player, opened the innings as a guest batsman for Somerset, showed aggression initially, scoring 78 runs out of an opening partnership of 101, before getting out. Andrew McGlashan, summarising the day for ESPNcricinfo, described his innings as "commanding", and his shots "in good working order". After Strauss' dismissal, his opening partner Arul Suppiah began to score more freely, and reached his century off 179 balls, scoring his second 50 from just 57 deliveries. Suppiah and Nick Compton put on a second wicket partnership of 223 before Compton was dismissed for 88. Suppiah reached 156, his highest first-class score before he was out, and Somerset eventually declared their innings closed at 425/3.

In reply, the Indians struggled with the bat during the second, rain affected day; Somerset's Charl Willoughby took five wickets against a batting line-up which showed its lack of match practice and Craig Meschede took the wicket of Sachin Tendulkar for his first first-class wicket. On the third morning, Suresh Raina controlled the strike well to bat his way to a century and stake his claim for a place in first Test, dominating a final wicket partnership of 84. Somerset once more look assured with the bat during their second innings, in which Strauss reached a century, eventually finishing 109 not out, and Peter Trego scored a rapid 85 runs from 57 balls. Somerset declared at tea on the final day, leaving India only a short period to bat in the second innings. The match finished as a draw, but Somerset coach Andrew Hurry suggested that Somerset had "bullied" India, and that it had been "a perfect three days" for Strauss.

=== Match log ===
No.	Date	Opponents	Venue	Result	Ref
1	15–17 July	India	County Ground, Taunton	Drawn	

== Statistics ==
=== Batting ===
Player	First class							List A							Twenty20							
Player	Matches	Innings	Runs	Highest score	Average	100s	50s	Matches	Innings	Runs	Highest score	Average	100s	50s	Matches	Innings	Runs	Highest score	Average	Strike rate	100s	50s
Batsmen
AWR Barrow	7	11	218	69	19.81	0	1															
NRD Compton	14	23	1,098	254*	57.78	2	6	12	10	280	104	40.00	1	0	13	11	196	44	24.50	98.98	0	0
JC Hildreth	16	25	923	186	38.45	2	4	14	11	268	50*	29.77	0	1	27	25	561	69*	26.71	110.86	0	3
CR Jones	8	12	169	55	15.36	0	2	2	2	78	45*	78.00	0	0	3	3	36	16	12.00	138.46	0	0
AJ Strauss	1	2	187	109*	187.00	1	1															
ME Trescothick	13	23	1,673	227	79.66	6	6	12	11	338	111*	37.55	1	2	16	16	507	108*	39.00	162.50	1	3
All-rounders
L Gregory	5	8	98	48	14.00	0	0	7	2	12	11	6.00	0	0	15	5	27	15	6.75	69.23	0	0
CJ Haggett															3	2	3	2	1.50	75.00	0	0
CAJ Meschede	5	8	149	53	21.28	0	1	9	5	66	19	13.20	0	0	16	13	180	53	18.00	125.00	0	1
KA Pollard															11	10	234	47*	39.00	162.50	0	0
AV Suppiah	17	31	961	156	34.32	1	6	14	7	131	57	26.20	0	1	27	18	144	26	12.00	99.31	0	0
AC Thomas	8	10	333	94	33.30	0	1	9	3	46	22	15.33	0	0	16	7	35	15*	17.50	100.00	0	0
PD Trego	17	26	676	120	32.19	1	4	14	13	444	100	37.00	1	2	25	24	497	70	21.60	114.78	0	3
RE van der Merwe															12	10	348	89*	38.66	166.50	0	3
Wicket-keepers
JC Buttler	13	18	524	100	30.82	1	3	13	10	411	94*	137.00	0	4	24	21	386	72*	21.44	131.74	0	1
C Kieswetter	9	14	572	164	40.85	2	3	10	9	399	108*	57.00	2	1	11	10	310	62	34.44	130.25	0	3
SP Snell	1	1	4	4	4.00	0	0	1	1	18	18*	–	0	0	3	2	44	34*	44.00	137.50	0	0
Bowlers
AJ Dibble	2	4	40	39*	20.00	0	0	4	0						2	0						
GH Dockrell	1	1	14	14	14.00	0	0	5	0						7	1	0	0*	–	0.00	0	0
GM Hussain	9	14	75	42	6.25	0	0	4	1	16	16*	–	0	0	7	3	7	4	2.33	35.00	0	0
SP Kirby	16	24	143	19	6.80	0	0	9	1	0	0*	–	0	0	22	6	11	7	3.66	84.61	0	0
M Kartik	8	13	285	65*	28.50	0	2	5	3	74	40	24.66	0	0	23	7	63	25*	15.75	110.52	0	0
BAW Mendis	2	4	52	28	13.00	0	0	4	0													
MTC Waller	1	0						6	2	12	11	6.00	0	0	13	3	6	3	6.00	66.66	0	0
CM Willoughby	15	19	50	23*	4.54	0	0								1	0						
Source: CricInfo

=== Bowling ===
Player	First class								List A							Twenty20						
Player	Matches	Overs	Wickets	Average	BBI	BBM	5wi	10wi	Matches	Overs	Wickets	Average	Economy	BBI	4wi	Matches	Overs	Wickets	Average	Economy	BBI	4wi
AWR Barrow	7	7.0	1	36.00	1/4	1/4	0	0														
AJ Dibble	2	36.0	2	71.00	1/26	1/57	0	0	4	26.0	5	34.00	6.53	3/52	0	2	8.0	2	22.00	5.50	1/20	0
GH Dockrell	1	18.0	2	38.00	2/76	2/76	0	0	5	30.0	5	26.60	4.43	3/27	0	7	19.0	5	26.80	7.05	2/15	0
L Gregory	5	48.0	4	55.50	1/15	1/38	0	0	7	32.0	13	14.53	5.90	4/27	2	15	40.0	20	16.20	8.10	4/15	1
CJ Haggett																3	5.0	1	32.00	6.40	1/15	0
GM Hussain	9	247.1	22	44.86	6/33	6/70	1	0	4	25.0	3	60.66	7.28	2/40	0	7	21.0	9	16.55	7.09	3/40	0
M Kartik	8	322.2	26	34.34	5/137	6/109	1	0	5	32.0	5	38.20	5.96	2/24	0	23	79.0	21	24.23	6.44	2/7	0
SP Kirby	16	490.2	53	31.54	6/115	6/115	1	0	9	47.2	20	16.05	6.78	3/27	0	22	57.1	18	25.50	8.02	3/26	0
BAW Mendis	2	66.1	4	71.25	4/183	4/183	0	0	4	27.0	8	16.87	5.00	4/35	1							
CAJ Meschede	5	34.1	2	70.50	1/14	1/37	0	0	9	28.0	5	32.00	5.71	2/16	0	16	10.3	6	13.66	7.80	3/9	0
KA Pollard																11	37.3	12	24.50	8.61	3/25	0
AV Suppiah	17	149.1	10	44.70	2/16	2/16	0	0	14	45.3	9	23.00	4.54	2/2	0	27	30.4	15	14.13	6.91	6/5	1
AC Thomas	8	236.5	33	25.45	6/60	10/88	1	1	9	48.2	7	36.00	5.21	2/36	0	16	55.5	18	23.05	7.43	3/23	0
PD Trego	17	293.4	28	38.50	4/22	7/93	0	0	14	60.0	10	35.50	5.91	3/33	0	25	27.3	7	35.00	8.90	2/24	0
RE van der Merwe																12	39.0	10	28.60	7.33	2/15	0
MTC Waller	1	5.2	1	28.00	1/7	1/28	0	0	6	28.4	5	31.20	5.44	1/14	0	13	38.0	16	14.05	6.28	3/16	0
CM Willoughby	15	507.3	53	32.47	6/76	6/92	1	0								1	1.0	0	–	17.00	0/17	0
Source: CricInfo

=== Fielding ===
Player	First class			List A			Twenty20		
Player	Matches	Innings	Catches	Matches	Innings	Catches	Matches	Innings	Catches
AWR Barrow	7	13	4						
JC Buttler	13	8	3	13	10	3	24	10	7
NRD Compton	14	25	5	12	12	3	13	12	2
GH Dockrell				5	5	3	7	6	6
L Gregory				7	7	1	15	15	7
JC Hildreth	16	28	22	14	14	7	27	26	12
GM Hussain	9	16	2	4	4	2	7	7	1
CR Jones	8	15	5				3	3	1
M Kartik	8	15	4	5	5	4	23	22	5
SP Kirby	16	28	5	9	9	1	22	21	4
BAW Mendis				4	4	1			
CAJ Meschede				9	9	4	16	16	4
KA Pollard							11	11	9
AV Suppiah	17	30	11	14	14	5	27	26	10
AC Thomas							16	15	5
PD Trego	17	30	10	14	14	5	25	24	7
ME Trescothick	13	23	28	12	12	5	16	16	4
RE van der Merwe							12	11	5
MTC Waller				6	6	1	13	13	6
CM Willoughby	15	26	2						
Source: CricInfo

=== Wicket Keeping ===
Player	First class				List A				Twenty20			
Player	Matches	Innings	Catches	Stumpings	Matches	Innings	Catches	Stumpings	Matches	Innings	Catches	Stumpings
JC Buttler	13	14	28	1	13	3	4	0	24	13	4	7
C Kieswetter	9	15	28	1	10	10	10	0	11	10	8	1
SP Snell	1	1	0	0	1	1	2	0	3	3	0	0
Source: CricInfo
