= James Regan (cricketer) =

English cricketer

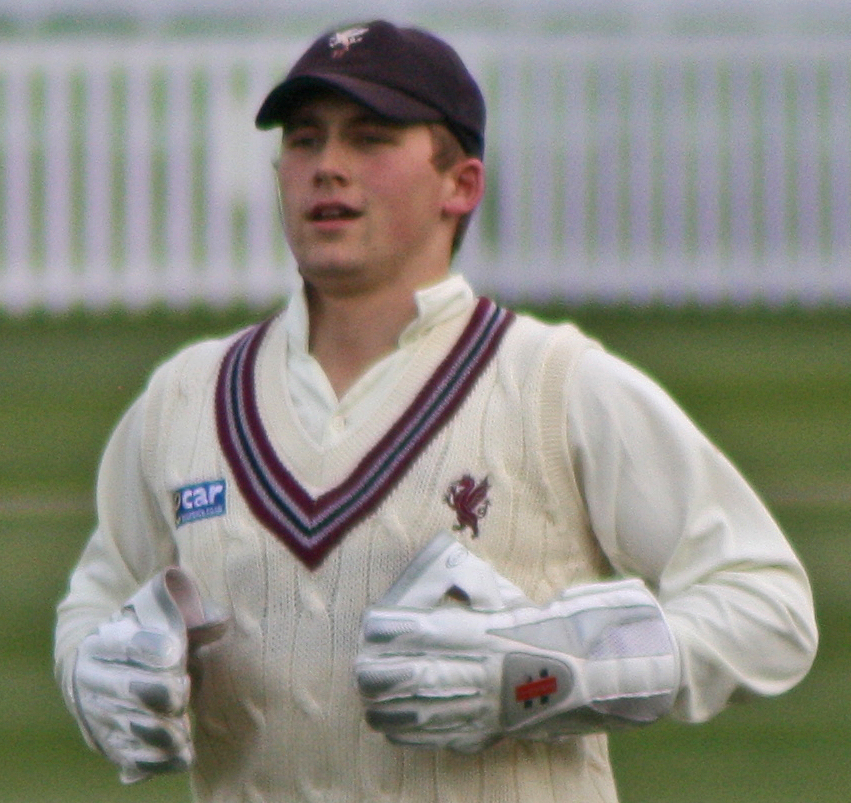

Personal information
- Full name: James Alan Regan
- Born: 30 May 1994 (age 32); Frimley, Surrey, England
- Batting: Right-handed
- Role: Wicket-keeper

Domestic team information
- Years: Team
- 2012–2015: Somerset (squad no. 19)
- Only First-class: 31 March 2012 Somerset v Cardiff MCCU

Career statistics
Competition	First-class
Matches	1
Runs scored	–
Batting average	–
100s/50s	–/–
Top score	–
Catches/stumpings	0/0
- Source: CricketArchive, 31 March 2012

James Alan Regan (born 30 May 1994) is an English cricketer who played for Somerset County Cricket Club. He is a right-handed batsman who also plays as a wicket-keeper.

== Life and career ==
James Regan was born in Frimley, Surrey on 30 May 1994. Regan attended St Patrick's Catholic Primary School, Farnborough and All Hallows Catholic School, Farnham before moving on to King's College, where he scored runs heavily. Regan joined the Somerset County Cricket Club academy in 2011 and featured significantly for the Somerset Second XI towards the end of the summer with both bat and gloves.

Regan made his first-class debut for Somerset against Cardiff MCC University on 31 March 2012, following the decision to rest senior wicket-keepers Jos Buttler and Craig Kieswetter. Regan didn't bat in Somerset's only innings of the match and failed to take a catch behind the stumps. Regan then kept wicket for part of the two-day match against the touring South Africans in July 2012. Regan spent the 2012–13 winter playing grade cricket for Latrobe Cricket Club in Tasmania, Australia.

In 2013, Regan played regularly for the Somerset 2nd XI but his only first team match was against Cardiff MCCU in a three-day match.

Having played regularly and scored well with the bat for the Second XI in the 2014 season, Regan was expected to make his breakthrough into the first team in 2015. However, before the career-ending injury to Craig Kieswetter, Regan broke his metacarpal on his right index finger just on the knuckle. With Alex Barrow as the only fit wicket-keeper in the squad, the county signed Michael Bates as cover. At the end of the 2015 season, Regan was released by Somerset. Regan subsequently announced that he would retrain as an independent financial advisor, with Taunton-based Cooper Associates. He now works in the mortgage division of the company and looks after several clients from within Cricket.
