= Michael Bates (English cricketer) =

English cricketer (born 1990)

Personal information
- Full name: Michael David Bates
- Born: 10 October 1990 (age 36); Frimley, Surrey, England
- Batting: Right-handed
- Role: Wicket-keeper

Domestic team information
- Years: Team
- 2010–2014: Hampshire (squad no. 16)
- 2015: Wiltshire
- 2015: Somerset
- 2016-present: Wiltshire
- FC debut: 15 April 2010 Hampshire v Oxford MCCU
- Last FC: 14 June 2015 Somerset v Nottinghamshire
- LA debut: 25 July 2010 Hampshire v Kent
- Last LA: 21 August 2014 Hampshire v Yorkshire

Career statistics
Competition	FC	LA	T20
Matches	52	39	39
Runs scored	1,177	111	63
Batting average	19.94	10.09	10.50
100s/50s	1/5	0/0	0/0
Top score	103	24*	15
Catches/stumpings	149/7	25/4	18/10
- Source: CricketArchive, 24 August 2015

Michael David Bates (born 10 October 1990) is an English cricketer. Bates is a right-handed batsman who plays as a wicket-keeper. Bates was regarded during his high level career as one of England's best wicket-keepers, but his batting ability was below modern standards expected of non-bowlers and that limited his career opportunities. He had a short First Class Cricket career and never played for a senior national team.

== Career ==
=== Youth ===
Bates was born in Frimley, Surrey, and was educated at Lord Wandsworth College, Hook, Hampshire. He joined Hampshire's under-10 academy team, and progressed through their youth ranks. Bates represented the England U-19 cricket team, playing one Youth Test match and ten Youth One Day Internationals. Bates played for England in the 2010 U-19 Cricket World Cup.

=== Hampshire: 2010-2014 ===
Bates made his first-class debut for Hampshire against Oxford University at University Parks, Oxford in 2010. Bates was an integral part Hampshire's team that won the 2010 Friends Provident T20. Veteran keeper Nic Pothas' injury meant that Bates played a lot of matches in 2011, and whilst his batting was rarely needed his tidy work behind the stumps and especially the pressure he created standing up to the likes of Dominic Cork and Chris Wood was vital to winning. For the 2013 season, Hampshire signed wicket keeper/batsman Adam Wheater from Essex, which limited Bates to mainly T20 and 2nd XI cricket for the following two seasons. As a result, he was released at the end of the 2014 season on expiry of his contract.

=== Somerset: 2015 ===
After trials at Essex, he signed for Minor Counties team Wiltshire. However, after the retirement of Craig Kieswetter due to injury, an out-of-form Alex Barrow and an injury to second choice 'keeper James Regan, after playing in a trial match for the second II, Bates signed a monthlong contract with Somerset in June 2015. He made his debut for the county in the first-class match against Nottinghamshire. His contract was extended to the end of the 2015 season on 5 July 2015 on the recommendation of Somerset's Director of Cricket Matthew Maynard, but was not extended beyond that, and he was released. He subsequently rejoined Wiltshire for 2016.

== Style and performance ==
Bates batting averages 21.2 in first-class cricket, scoring one century in his first 60 innings. His average is less in the shorter forms: 8.36 in List A games; 10.5 in T20. However, he averaged 3.5 catches per match as wicket keeper in 2010, a Hampshire record for a season.
