= Andy Sutton (cricketer) =

English cricketer (born 1985)

Personal information
- Full name: Andrew Peter Sutton
- Born: 29 November 1985 (age 40); Worcester, England
- Batting: Right-handed
- Bowling: Right arm medium-fast
- Role: Bowler

Domestic team information
- Years: Team
- 2004–2009: Herefordshire
- 2010–2011: Wiltshire
- 2012: Somerset
- 2016: Herefordshire
- Only First-class: 31 March 2012 Somerset v Cardiff MCCU

Career statistics
| Competition | FC |
|---|---|
| Matches | 1 |
| Runs scored | – |
| Batting average | – |
| 100s/50s | –/– |
| Top score | – |
| Balls bowled | 180 |
| Wickets | 2 |
| Bowling average | 49.50 |
| 5 wickets in innings | 0 |
| 10 wickets in match | 0 |
| Best bowling | 1/31 |
| Catches/stumpings | 0/– |
- Source: ESPNcricinfo, 2 April 2012

Andrew Peter Sutton (born 29 November 1985) is an English former cricketer who played as a right arm medium-fast bowler and right-handed batsman for Somerset, Herefordshire and Wiltshire. He joined Somerset after impressing for Gloucestershire Second XI in a match against Somerset Second XI in May 2007 and was awarded a one-year contract for the 2008 season, at the end of which he was released without having made a first-team appearance. However, he later appeared for Somerset against Cardiff MCC University in what turned out to be his only first-class match from 31 March to 2 April 2012. He took a wicket in each innings and did not bat.
