= Robert Mutch =

South African cricketer (born 1984)

Personal information
- Full name: Robert Grant Mutch
- Born: 3 September 1984 (age 42); Johannesburg, Transvaal Province, South Africa
- Batting: Left-handed
- Bowling: Left arm medium-fast
- Role: Bowler

Domestic team information
- Years: Team
- 2006–2009: Easterns
- 2012: Somerset
- First-class debut: 19 January 2006 Easterns v Griqualand West
- Last First-class: 5 March 2009 Easterns v Gauteng
- List A debut: 22 January 2006 Easterns v Griqualand West
- Last List A: 19 August 2012 Somerset v Scotland

Career statistics
Competition	First-class	List A
Matches	5	4
Runs scored	116	–
Batting average	29.00	–
100s/50s	0/0	–/–
Top score	34*	–
Balls bowled	485	135
Wickets	20	8
Bowling average	24.25	15.75
5 wickets in innings	0	0
10 wickets in match	0	0
Best bowling	4/49	4/28
Catches/stumpings	1/–	1/–
- Source: Cricket Archive, 19 August 2012

Robert Grant Mutch (born 3 September 1984) is a South African cricketer who has played for Easterns cricket team and Somerset County Cricket Club. He is a left-handed batsman and left arm medium-fast bowler. He made his first-class debut for Easterns cricket team against Griqualand West, on 19 January 2006 and took four wickets in the first innings.
