= Latrobe Cricket Club =

Australian cricket team

- Founded: 1950
- Based in: Latrobe, Tasmania
- Home ground: Latrobe Recreation Ground
- Colours: Red Cap, Red & Blue One-Day Strip
- Head coach: Chris Boon
- Captain: Chris Boon
- Cricket North West Titles: Four (1973–74 & 2005–06)
- 2008/09: 5th

Latrobe Cricket Club (LCC) is a cricket team which represents Latrobe in the North Western Tasmanian Cricket Association grade cricket competition, in the Australian state of Tasmania.

== Honours ==
NWTCA Premierships:
