= James Burke (cricketer) =

English cricketer (born 1991)

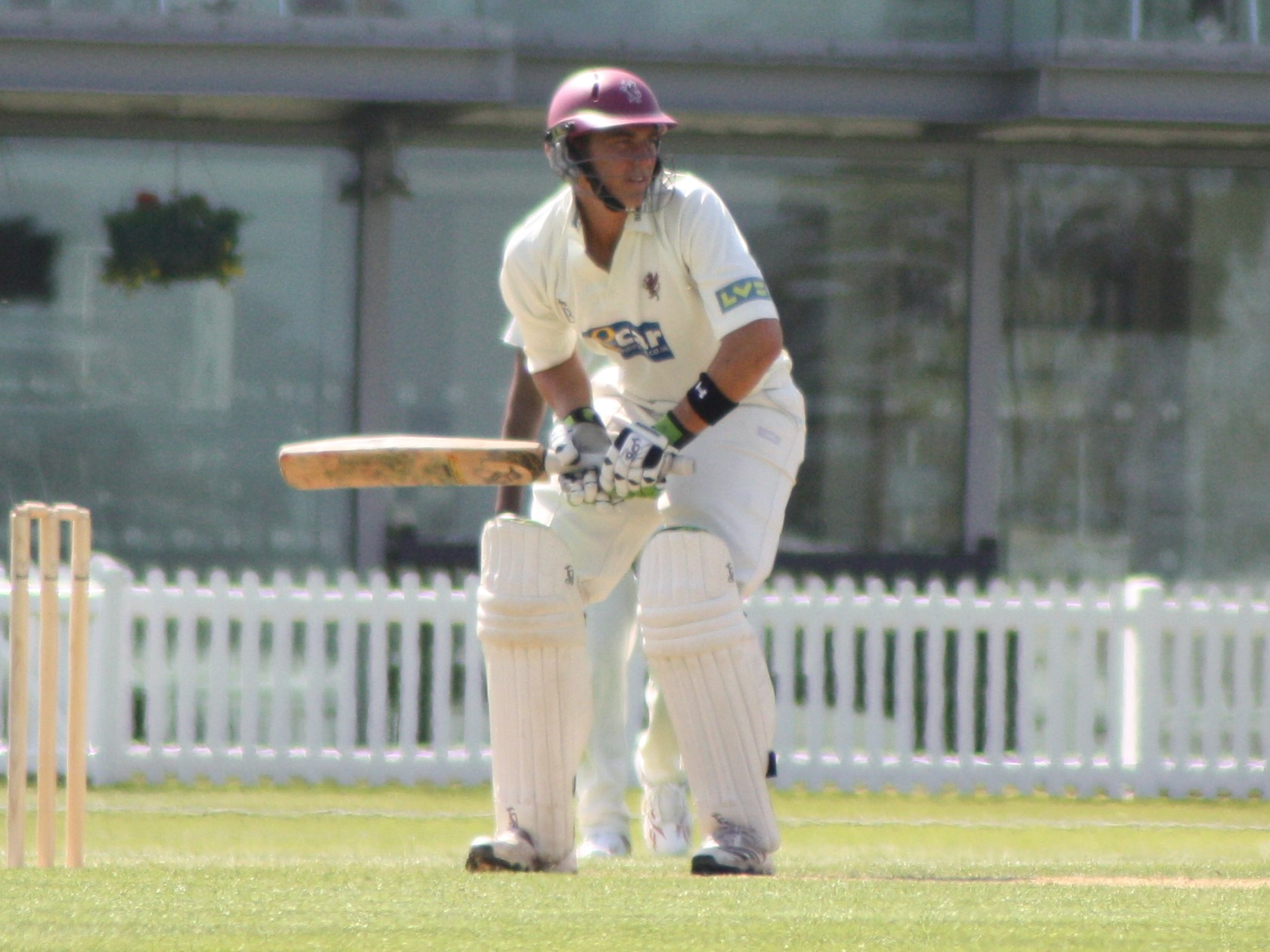

Personal information
- Full name: James Edward Burke
- Born: 25 January 1991 (age 35); Plymouth, Devon, England
- Height: 6 ft 3 in (1.91 m)
- Batting: Right-handed
- Bowling: Right arm medium-fast
- Role: All-rounder

Domestic team information
- Years: Team
- 2008–2019: Devon
- 2012–2014: Somerset
- 2015–2016: Surrey
- 2017: → Leicestershire (on loan)
- FC debut: 31 March 2012 Somerset v Cardiff MCCU
- LA debut: 27 June 2014 Somerset v Essex

Career statistics
Competition	FC	LA	T20
Matches	13	10	14
Runs scored	274	94	30
Batting average	17.12	11.75	4.28
100s/50s	0/2	0/0	0/0
Top score	79	26*	8
Balls bowled	1,083	357	147
Wickets	23	17	10
Bowling average	30.60	20.58	22.50
5 wickets in innings	0	1	0
10 wickets in match	0	0	0
Best bowling	4/19	5/28	3/23
Catches/stumpings	6/–	3/–	6/–
- Source: CricketArchive, 1 April 2017

James Edward Burke (born 25 January 1991) is an English cricketer who played for Surrey County Cricket Club. He is a right-handed batsman and right arm medium-fast bowler. He made his first-class debut for Somerset against Cardiff MCC University, on 31 March 2012. Burke plays club cricket for Budleigh Salterton CC in the Premier Division of the Devon Cricket League.

Having been released by Somerset at the end of the 2011 season, Burke enjoyed a successful return to the Second XI in 2013 and he was rewarded with a summer contract with Somerset for the 2014 season.

On 1 September 2014, Surrey County Cricket Club announced the signing of Burke on a two-year contract from the end of the 2014 season.

On 25 January 2017, Burke signed for Leicestershire on loan from Surrey for the 2017 season. During the 2017 season Surrey announced that Burke had left the club.
