= Gemaal Hussain =

English cricketer

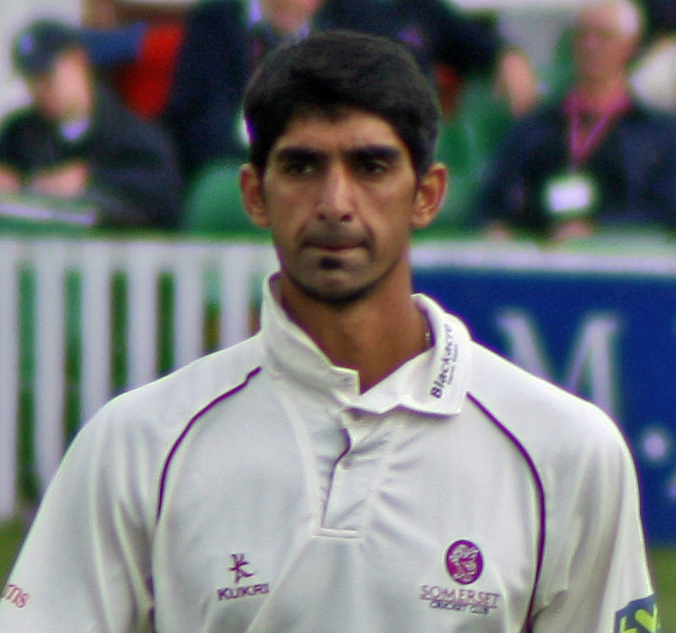

Personal information
- Full name: Gemaal Maqsood Hussain
- Born: 10 October 1983 (age 43); Waltham Forest, London, England
- Height: 6 ft 5 in (1.96 m)
- Batting: Right-handed
- Bowling: Right-arm medium
- Role: Bowler

Domestic team information
- Years: Team
- 2009–2010: Gloucestershire
- 2011–2013: Somerset
- 2014: Northamptonshire
- FC debut: 30 June 2009 Gloucestershire v Kent
- Last FC: 26 June 2013 Somerset v Australians
- LA debut: 27 September 2009 Gloucestershire v Nottinghamshire
- Last LA: 31 July 2014 Northamptonshire v New Zealand A

Career statistics
Competition	FC	LA	T20
Matches	34	9	18
Runs scored	319	35	35
Batting average	9.66	–	4.37
100s/50s	0/0	0/0	0/0
Top score	42	18*	8
Balls bowled	5,270	350	354
Wickets	111	12	21
Bowling average	30.31	33.66	23.28
5 wickets in innings	4	0	0
10 wickets in match	0	0	0
Best bowling	6/33	3/101	3/22
Catches/stumpings	5/–	3/–	4/–
- Source: CricketArchive, 20 August 2014

Gemaal Maqsood Hussain (born 10 October 1983) is an English professional cricketer. A right-arm fast-medium paced bowler, he moved to Somerset from neighbouring county Gloucestershire at the close of the 2010 season.

== Career ==
=== Early career ===
Hussain was born in Waltham Forest, London on 10 October 1983. He was raised in Nottingham where he played club cricket for Notts Unity Casuals during 2002, and later played in Bradford for four years while he studied Sports science at the University of Leeds. During the 2006 season, he played a number of games for the Essex second team, and the following year he appeared for a variety of county second teams, starting off at Nottinghamshire, before moving onto Worcestershire, and then back to Essex, followed by a single match for Surrey, and another for Essex. He played two second eleven matches in 2008, both for Worcestershire, and was spotted playing in the Birmingham League by Jack Russell and Stuart Barnes, after which he was offered a trial at Gloucestershire.

He made his debut for Gloucestershire during the 2009 Twenty20 Cup, claiming two wickets against Worcestershire. He finished the competition with 10 wickets, second amongst Gloucestershire bowlers. His first-class debut followed immediately after the Twenty20 Cup when he was selected for the County Championship match against Kent. He claimed two tail-end wickets in the first innings of the match, which Gloucestershire lost by 76 runs. He did not appear for Gloucestershire again until the final match of the season, when he made his debut in List A cricket, taking the wickets of both of Nottinghamshire's opening batsmen to help his side to a nine wicket victory.

== First-class breakthrough ==
Hussain made his breakthrough for Gloucestershire in 2010, appearing in all but one of their County Championship fixtures. He claimed his maiden five-wicket haul in bowler-friendly conditions at the County Ground in Bristol, taking five wickets for 36 against Northamptonshire. He picked up wickets regularly through the season, and claimed a second five-wicket haul against Middlesex in late April. Hussain finished the season with 67 first-class wickets, the second highest total in the County Championship, and the highest by an England qualified player. At the end of the season, Hussain rejected the offer of a new contract from Gloucestershire, stating that he wanted to play in the first division of the County Championship. He signed a three-year contract with Somerset in late October, joining his former Gloucestershire teammate Steven Kirby.

Hussain left Somerset at the end of the 2013 season having only made two Championship appearances that year.

During the 2014 season, Hussain played for the Second XI's of both Nottinghamshire and Northamptonshire following his release from Somerset. Hussain featured in one list A match for Northamptonshire against New Zealand A taking 3 wickets but conceding 101 runs in his 10 overs.
