= Max Waller =

English cricketer

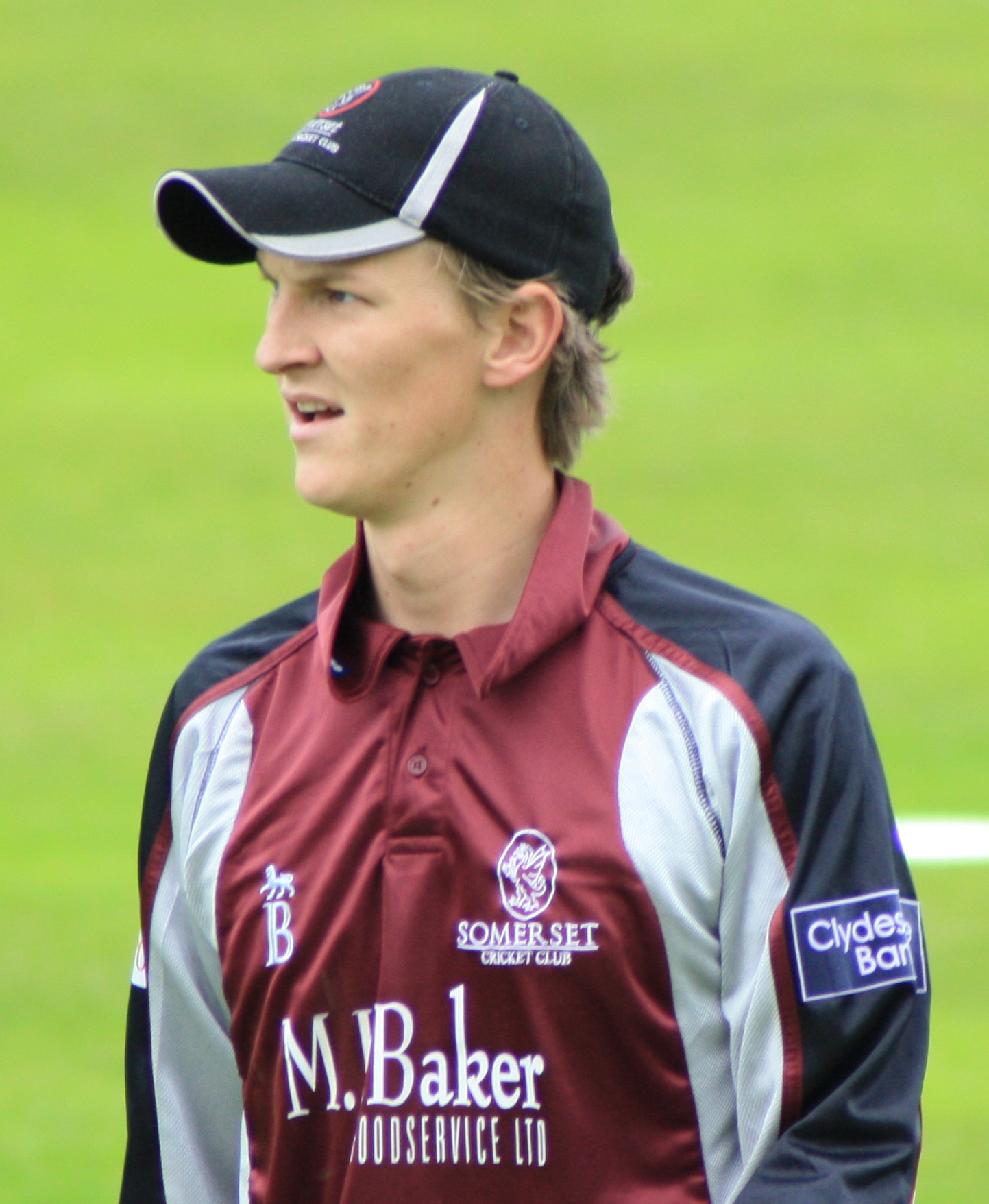

Personal information
- Full name: Maximilian Thomas Charles Waller
- Born: 3 March 1988 (age 38); Salisbury, Wiltshire, England
- Height: 6 ft 0 in (1.83 m)
- Batting: Right-handed
- Bowling: Right-arm leg break

Domestic team information
- Years: Team
- 2007–2022: Somerset (squad no. 10)
- 2019: Quetta Gladiators
- 2021: Southern Brave
- FC debut: 16 June 2009 Somerset v Sussex
- Last FC: 20 June 2018 Somerset v Surrey
- LA debut: 16 May 2009 Somerset v Kent
- Last LA: 7 August 2022 Somerset v Gloucestershire

Career statistics
Competition	FC	LA	T20
Matches	9	59	144
Runs scored	91	118	106
Batting average	10.11	16.85	7.06
100s/50s	0/0	0/0	0/0
Top score	28	25*	17
Balls bowled	840	1,819	2,774
Wickets	10	45	139
Bowling average	49.30	37.97	24.44
5 wickets in innings	0	0	0
10 wickets in match	0	0	0
Best bowling	3/33	3/37	4/16
Catches/stumpings	5/–	32/–	86/–
- Source: ESPNcricinfo, 7 August 2022

Maximilian Thomas Charles Waller (born 3 March 1988) is an English professional cricketer who played first-class, List A and Twenty20 cricket for the Somerset County Cricket Club. He was a right-handed batsman and a leg break bowler.

In 2007 and 2008, Waller played for Somerset 2nd XI, making his 1st XI debut in the 2009 Twenty20 competition. Waller was named 2nd X1 Player of the Year in 2011.

2017 saw Waller continue his run in white ball cricket in the NatWest T20 Blast. Somerset qualified for the T20 Blast finals day in 2018. Waller claimed his 100th wicket for the club, becoming only the second after Alfonso Thomas to do so.

In 2019, Waller was signed by Pakistan Super League team Quetta Gladiators as cover for Sunil Narine, who was injured.

At the end of the 2022 season, Waller announced his retirement from professional cricket. He was the leading all time wicket taker for Somerset in T20 cricket.
