= Steve Snell =

English cricketer (born 1983)

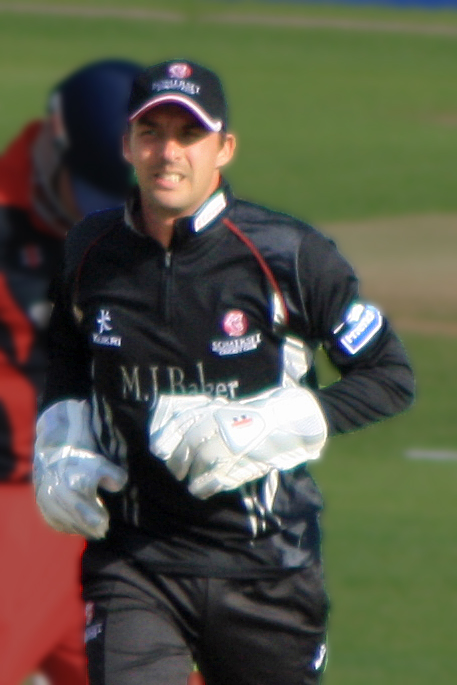

Personal information
- Full name: Steven David Snell
- Born: 27 February 1983 (age 43); Winchester, Hampshire, England
- Nickname: Snelly
- Height: 6 ft 0 in (1.83 m)
- Batting: Right-handed
- Role: Wicket-keeper

Domestic team information
- Years: Team
- 2011–2012: Somerset
- 2004–2010: Gloucestershire
- 2001: Hampshire Cricket Board
- FC debut: 20 July 2005 Gloucestershire v Bangladesh A
- Last FC: 11 September 2012 Somerset v Worcestershire
- LA debut: 13 September 2001 Hampshire CB v Ireland
- Last LA: 29 August 2011 Somerset v Essex

Career statistics
Competition	FC	LA	T20
Matches	44	26	22
Runs scored	1,701	346	227
Batting average	26.16	20.35	18.91
100s/50s	1/13	0/2	0/1
Top score	127	95	50
Catches/stumpings	104/3	34/1	9/3
- Source: ESPNcricinfo, 13 September 2012

Steven David Snell (born 27 February 1983) is an English former cricketer. He was a right-handed batsman who played as a choice wicket keeper. He is currently Head of Performance for Cricket Scotland.

== Biography ==
Born 27 February 1983 in Winchester, Hampshire, Snell started his career at Hampshire but after failing to break through signed for Gloucestershire in 2004. After spending a season playing second XI cricket he got his first-class debut in 2005 against Bangladesh A, scoring 83 not out to help his side recover from 72/7. He finished the season with a number of List A matches and by making his county debut, solely as a batsman.

Snell made few first-team appearances in 2006 but in 2007 played four first-class matches because of injury to regular keeper Stephen Adshead. Another injury to Adshead at the start of the 2008 season enabled Snell to score his first championship fifty against Glamorgan, and a maiden first-class hundred against Worcestershire. His good form continued and he was able to cement his position as first-choice keeper in four-day cricket although Adshead continued to keep in limited-overs cricket. In August 2008 he was rewarded with a three-year contract.

Snell played the 2010/11 season for the Camberwell Magpies Cricket Club, in the Victorian Premier Cricket competition. He then turned out for Hertfordshire in 2011. In August 2011, with both first choice keepers on England duty, he played for Somerset in a CB40 game against Essex, before playing in a County Championship game against Hampshire. He then joined the Somerset squad in the opening qualifier of the Champions League qualifier against Auckland Aces in Hyderabad, a game in which Snell won the man of the match award for his 34 not out, and eliminate Auckland from the competition.

On 13 November 2014, Snell rejoined Somerset as their second XI coach and academy director. Snell left his role with Somerset in 2021, to take up the role of performance director at Gloucestershire.

In November 2023, Snell was appointed Head of Performance for Cricket Scotland.
