= Peter Trego =

English cricketer

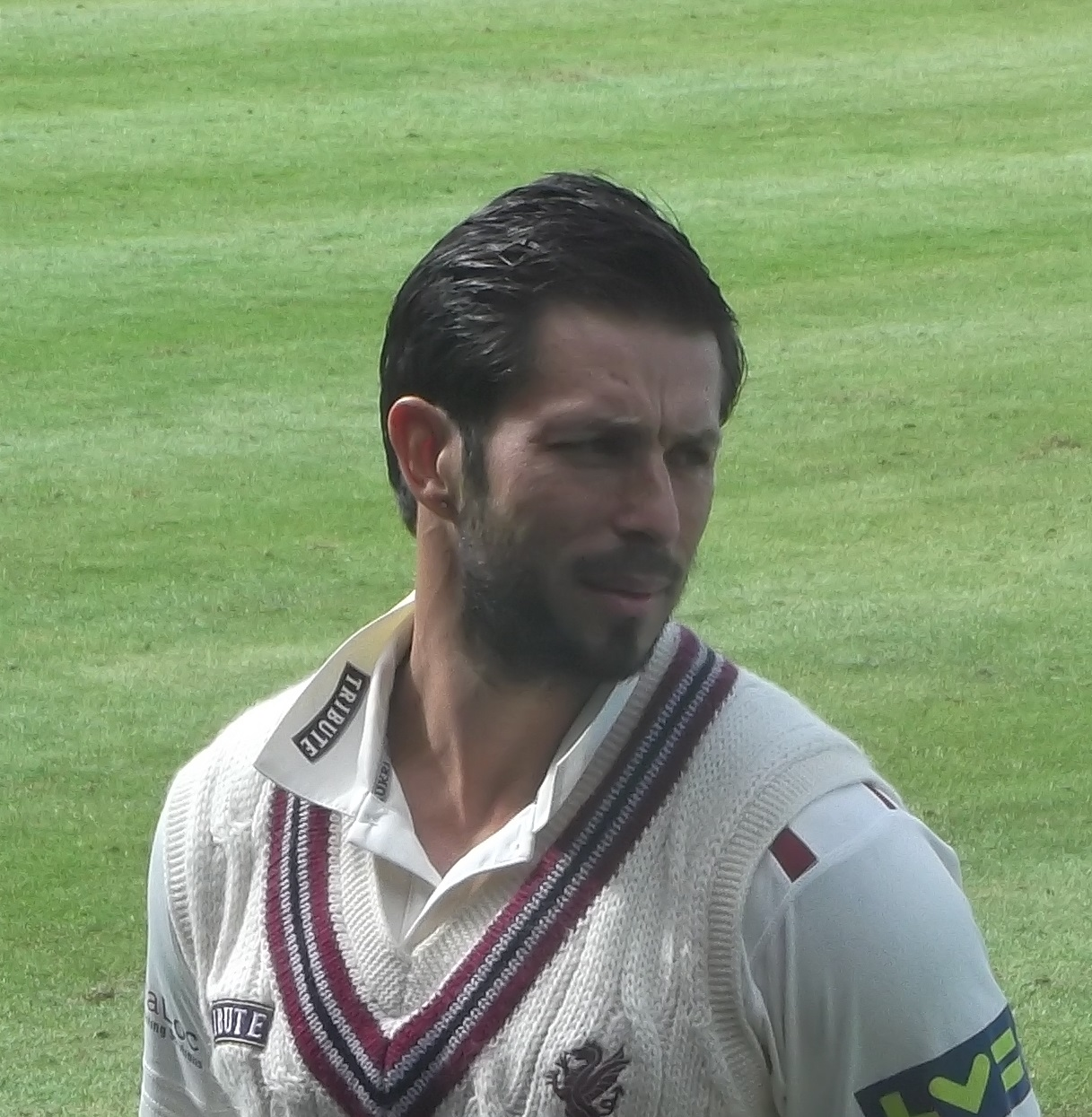
- Trego preparing to lead the Somerset 2nd XI against the Devon County Cricket Club, 2014.

Personal information
- Full name: Peter David Trego
- Born: 12 June 1981 (age 45); Weston-super-Mare, Somerset, England
- Nickname: Tregs, Darcy, Pedro Tregos
- Height: 6 ft 0 in (1.83 m)
- Batting: Right-handed
- Bowling: Right-arm medium
- Role: All-rounder

Domestic team information
- Years: Team
- 1996–2002: Somerset
- 1999–2001: Somerset Cricket Board
- 2003: Kent
- 2005: Middlesex
- 2005: Herefordshire
- 2006–2019: Somerset (squad no. 7)
- 2011/12: Mashonaland Eagles
- 2012: Sylhet Royals
- 2012/13–2013/14: Central Districts
- 2018: Cornwall
- 2019: Devon (squad no. 77)
- 2020–2021: Nottinghamshire (squad no. 77)
- First-class debut: 7 April 2000; Somerset v Oxford Universities
- List A debut: 17 May 1999 SCB v Bedfordshire

Career statistics
Competition	FC	LA	T20
Matches	223	206	211
Runs scored	9,644	5,057	4,127
Batting average	32.80	31.80	23.99
100s/50s	15/54	10/26	0/21
Top score	154*	147	94*
Balls bowled	25,198	6,103	1,740
Wickets	395	173	78
Bowling average	36.35	32.68	31.97
5 wickets in innings	5	2	0
10 wickets in match	1	0	0
Best bowling	7/84	5/40	4/27
Catches/stumpings	90/–	59/–	57/–
- Source: CricketArchive, 1 September 2021

Peter David Trego (born 12 June 1981) is an English former cricketer who played primarily for Somerset. He is a right-handed batsman and right-arm medium pace bowler. He is a big hitting all-rounder who is capable of taking a one-day match away from opposing teams in the latter stages.

== Career ==
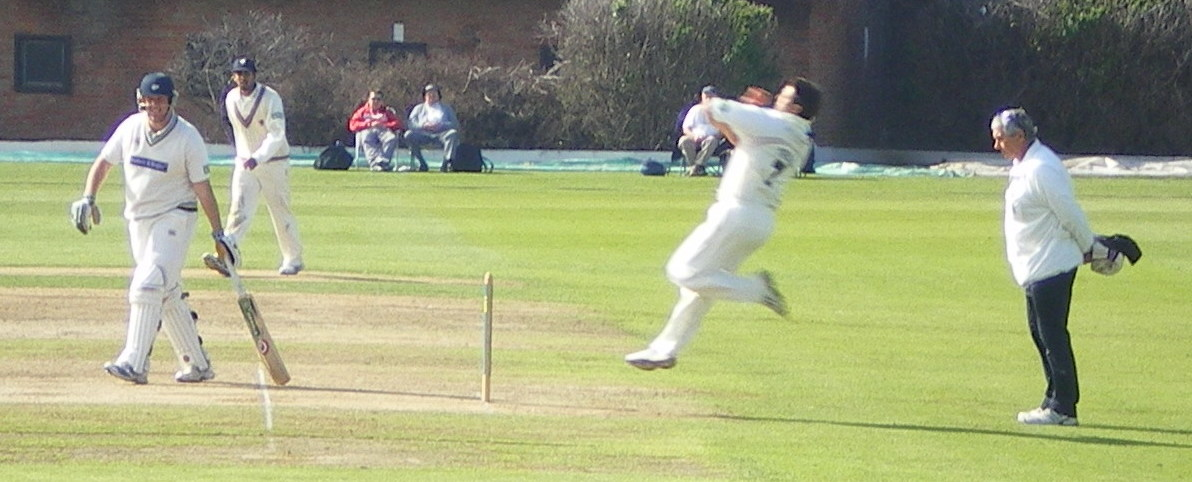
Trego bowling for Somerset at North Marine Road Ground, Scarborough

Born June 1981 in Weston-super-Mare, Somerset, Trego made his first-class debut for Somerset in April 2000 against Oxford Universities. He took two wickets in the match, but was not required to bat. His first appearance in county cricket came two months later, playing a Norwich Union National League game against Sussex. One of the highlights of Trego's debut season came in the Scarborough Festival County Championship match against Yorkshire, where he made an unbeaten 27 batting in Somerset's first innings, followed by bowling figures of 4/84 in Yorkshire's first innings.

Towards the end of the 2000 season, Trego was selected as part of the England under-19 cricket team to play the touring Sri Lanka national under-19 cricket team. He appeared in all three One Day Internationals (ODIs), scoring a half century and taking four wickets as he did so. He also played in the first Test, scoring 90, and taking 1/48 in the match.

He is the leading runscorer in Hong Kong Sixes cricket (184 runs). He also has the record for the highest individual score in Hong Kong Sixes(65*).

In July 2019, he was selected to play for the Rotterdam Rhinos in the inaugural edition of the Euro T20 Slam cricket tournament. However, the following month the tournament was cancelled.

Trego was released by Somerset at the end of the 2019 season and signed for Nottinghamshire on a two-year contract.

He announced his retirement with immediate effect from cricket in September 2021.

== Football career ==
Trego also plays football as a goalkeeper to a reasonable level. During the 2004–05 season, he played for Margate, and became only the third goalkeeper in the club's history to score when he found the net from a free kick within his own half. He has also played for Weston-super-Mare, Clevedon Town and Chippenham Town for whom he also scored while in goal in similar fashion to his previous one. In March 2015, he joined Bath City on non-contract forms.

== Television career ==
In March 2016 it was announced that Trego would join the new television channel Insight TV as a presenter and narrator, after he retires from playing cricket.

Trego has also presented on RobinsTV occasionally for Bristol City.

== Personal life ==
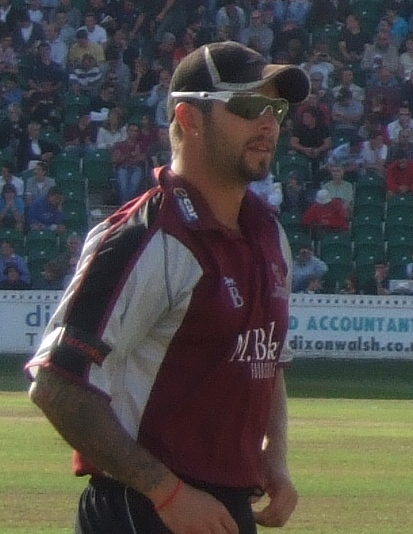
Peter Trego in the field during a match against Durham at Taunton in 2009.

Peter went to Wyvern Comprehensive School, now Hans Price Academy, in Weston-super-Mare.

He is married to Claire Trego, with whom he has three children.
