= Adam Dibble =

English cricketer (born 1991)

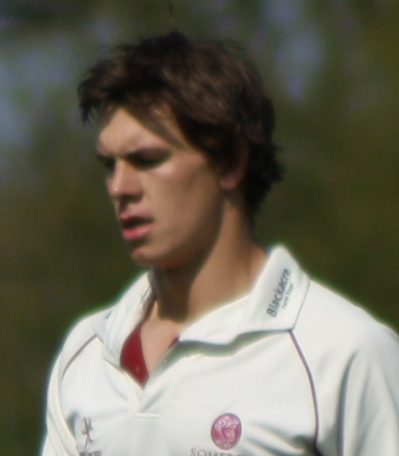

Personal information
- Full name: Adam John Dibble
- Born: 9 March 1991 (age 35); Exeter, Devon, England School = St John’s Sidmouth
- Height: 6 ft 4 in (1.93 m)
- Batting: Right-handed
- Bowling: Right-arm medium-fast
- Role: Bowler
- Relatives: Jodie Dibble (sister)

Domestic team information
- Years: Team
- 2008–2015: Somerset (squad no. 16)
- FC debut: 11 July 2011 Somerset v Nottinghamshire
- Last FC: 2 April 2015 Somerset v Durham MCCU
- LA debut: 1 May 2011 Somerset v Unicorns
- Last LA: 15 August 2013 Somerset v Yorkshire

Career statistics
Competition	FC	LA	T20
Matches	4	7	2
Runs scored	84	15	–
Batting average	21.00	15.00	–
100s/50s	0/0	0/0	–
Top score	43	15	–
Balls bowled	324	288	48
Wickets	5	11	2
Bowling average	41.00	26.81	22.00
5 wickets in innings	0	0	0
10 wickets in match	0	0	0
Best bowling	3/42	4/52	1/20
Catches/stumpings	0/–	1/–	0/–
- Source: CricketArchive, 4 April 2015

Adam John Dibble (born 9 March 1991) is an English former cricketer who played for Somerset County Cricket Club as a right-arm fast-medium bowler. He appeared for Somerset in thirteen matches between 2011 and 2015, but was constantly beset by injury, hampering his progress. He was released by Somerset at the end of the 2015 season, and indicated that he would retire from professional cricket.

== Cricket career ==
Adam Dibble was born in Exeter, Devon on 9 March 1991. As a right-arm fast-medium bowler, he played age-group cricket for Devon County Cricket Club before joining Somerset in 2008. During 2009 and 2010, he played for Somerset's second team, alongside club cricket for Sidmouth Cricket Club. His strong performances for the second team led to his senior debut in 2011, during the Clydesdale Bank 40, a one-day competition. He played four matches during that competition, taking five wickets at a bowling average of 34. Later that season he made his first-class debut, appearing in two County Championship matches, during which he took two wickets. He travelled with the Somerset team to compete in the 2011 Champions League Twenty20, where he played against the Warriors in the group stage and the Mumbai Indians in the semi-final. Those were his only senior Twenty20 appearances for Somerset, and he claimed two wickets at an average of 22.

Dibble made an early season appearance in the County Championship in which he took three wickets against Warwickshire, but suffered a rib injury during the game which ruled him out of the team. A recurring knee injury, tripartite patella, required an operation to repair, which resulted in him missing the rest of the 2012 season. He returned to the team in 2013, playing three one-day matches in which he took six wickets, including his career best bowling of 4 for 52 against Yorkshire. His season was once again curtailed by injury, on this occasion to his hamstring. During 2014 and 2015 he predominantly played for Somerset's second team, although he did appear in the first-class fixture against Durham MCCU at the start of the 2015 season, making his final first-team appearance for Somerset. He was released by Somerset at the end of 2015, and retired from professional cricket to work in the property market.
