= Chris Jones (cricketer) =

English cricketer

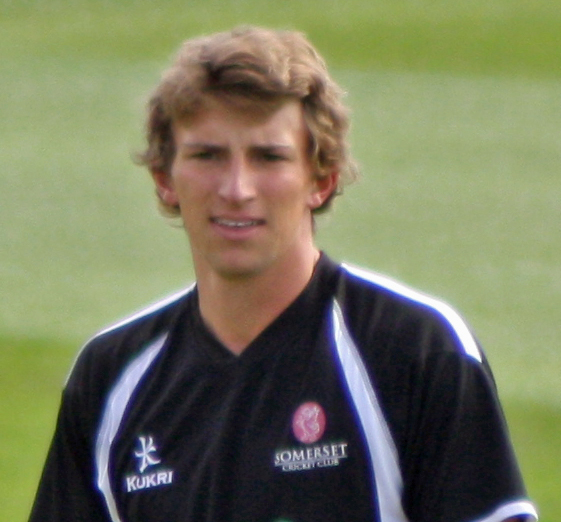

Personal information
- Full name: Christopher Robert Jones
- Born: 5 November 1990 (age 36); Harold Wood, London, England
- Batting: Right-handed
- Bowling: Right arm off break
- Role: Batsman

Domestic team information
- Years: Team
- 2008–2014: Dorset
- 2010–2014: Somerset (squad no. 14)
- 2011–2013: Durham MCCU
- FC debut: 7 September 2010 Somerset v Lancashire
- Last FC: 12 July 2014 Somerset v Northamptonshire
- LA debut: 29 August 2011 Somerset v Essex
- Last LA: 27 August 2012 Somerset v Surrey

Career statistics
Competition	FC	LA	T20
Matches	37	5	13
Runs scored	1,285	126	217
Batting average	22.15	42.00	19.72
100s/50s	1/9	0/0	0/1
Top score	130	45*	53*
Balls bowled	12	–	–
Wickets	1	–	–
Bowling average	17.00	–	–
5 wickets in innings	0	–	–
10 wickets in match	0	–	–
Best bowling	1/17	–	–
Catches/stumpings	22/–	0/–	6/–
- Source: ESPNcricinfo, 6 August 2014

Christopher Robert Jones (born 5 November 1990) is a former English cricketer who played for Somerset, who made his County Championship debut in 2010 as a replacement for Craig Kieswetter. He was born in Harold Wood in Havering but moved to Dorset at a young age.

He was educated at Broadstone Middle School, Poole Grammar School and Richard Huish College before moving on to Durham University to read Economics. He graduated from Durham with a first-class degree in June 2013. He has played first-class cricket with Durham MCCU and was awarded the university's 'sportsman of the year' award in 2011. Jones was called into the Somerset team for a tour match against Australia in July 2013, hitting his first first-class century.

On 15 August 2014, Jones announced his retirement from first-class cricket at the end of the 2014 season to pursue a career outside of the game.
