= Alex Barrow =

English cricketer

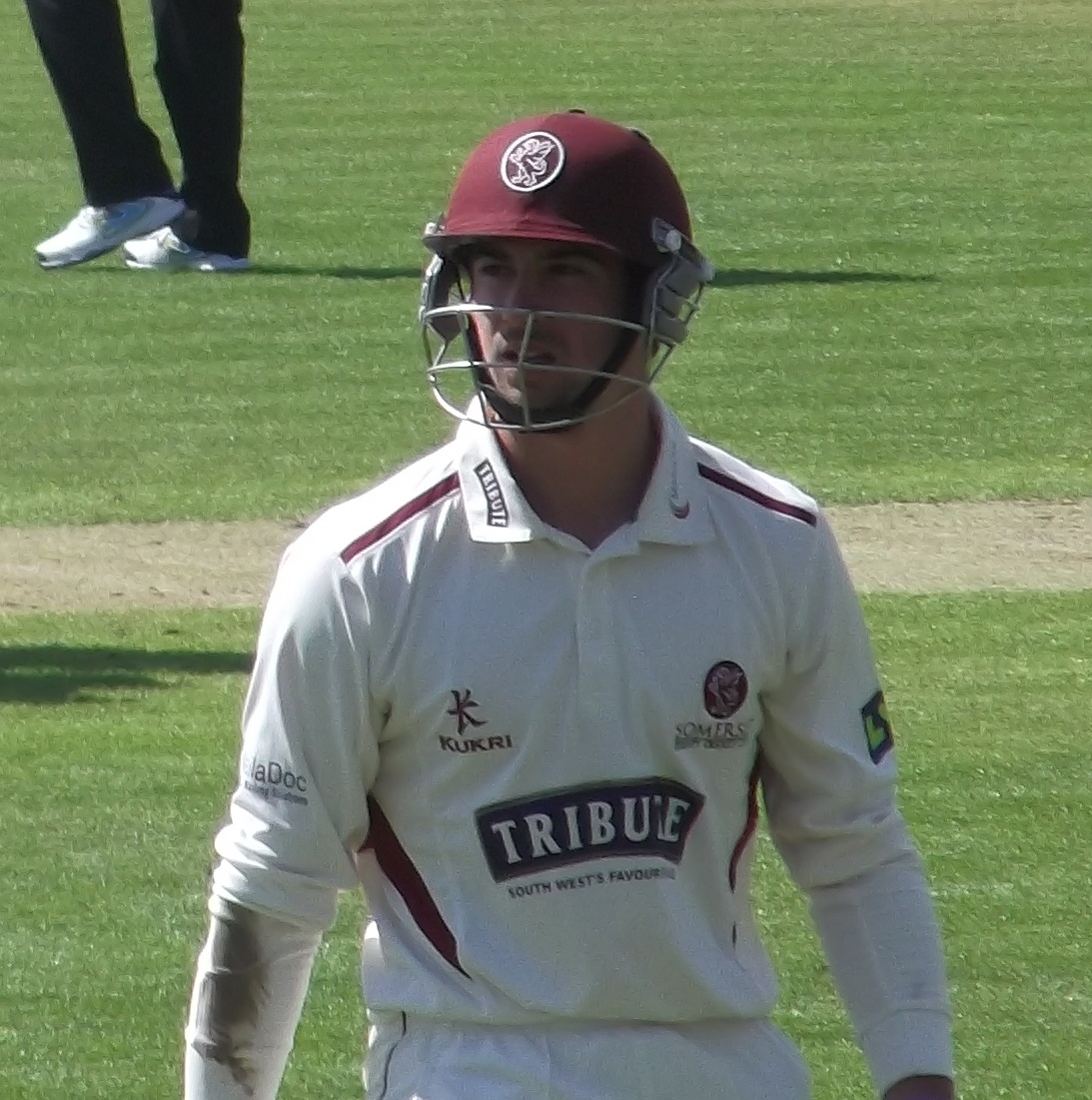
- Barrow walking back having been dismissed in a 2nd XI game against Devon County Cricket Club, April 2014.

Personal information
- Full name: Alexander William Rodgerson Barrow
- Born: 6 May 1992 (age 34); Bath, Somerset, England
- Batting: Right-handed
- Bowling: Right-arm medium; Right-arm off break
- Role: Wicket-keeper batsman

Domestic team information
- Years: Team
- 2011–2016: Somerset (squad no. 18)
- FC debut: 27 April 2011 Somerset v Hampshire
- Last FC: 10 July 2016 Somerset v Middlesex
- LA debut: 13 May 2012 Somerset v Durham
- Last LA: 14 June 2016 Somerset v Kent

Career statistics
Competition	FC	LA	T20
Matches	40	26	1
Runs scored	1,201	388	17
Batting average	19.37	25.86	–
100s/50s	0/4	0/2	0/0
Top score	88	72	17*
Balls bowled	42	–	–
Wickets	1	–	–
Bowling average	36.00	–	–
5 wickets in innings	0	–	–
10 wickets in match	0	–	–
Best bowling	1/4	–	–
Catches/stumpings	71/0	24/1	0/0
- Source: CricketArchive, 13 July 2016

Alexander William Rodgerson Barrow (born 6 May 1992) is an English cricketer who most recently played for Somerset County Cricket Club. He made his first team debut for the county in the 2011 County Championship against Hampshire.

Alex has risen through the ranks of the Somerset Youth sides representing the county from Under 11 to Under 17 and joining the county academy in 2008. Alex attended King's College, Taunton and Downside School, where his school career was prolific, culminating in 2010, when he was the leading Wisden schoolboy batsman, scoring 803 runs at an average of 160.60. In the same year he was called up to represent England U19s in their one day and T20 series versus Sri Lanka. He scored 50 on debut to help England win the first One Day International at Fenner's. Alex featured in all four remaining matches, the series ending drawn with two wins each and one no result. A shoulder operation was necessary at the end of the 2010 season but Alex recovered strongly and the start of the 2011 season saw him score heavily for Somerset 2nd XI which resulted in his call up to the senior side and his first-class debut against Hampshire at The Rose Bowl.

In 2015, after a mixed start, Alex scored heavily for the Somerset 2nd XI and forced his way back into the 1st team for several Royal London One-Day Cup matches. He went into the 2016 season competing with new signing Ryan Davies for the wicket-keeping position.

Barrow was released by Somerset at the end of the 2016 season becoming a player/coach at Exeter Cricket Club.
