= 2012 County Championship =

113th English cricket tournament season

- Dates: 5 April – 14 September 2012
- Administrator: England and Wales Cricket Board
- Cricket format: First-class cricket (4 days)
- Tournament format: League system (Two divisions)
- Champions: Warwickshire (7th title)
- Participants: 18
- Matches: 144

The 2012 County Championship season, known as the LV= County Championship for sponsorship reasons, was the 113th cricket County Championship season. Warwickshire won their seventh County Championship title, clinching the trophy with a match to spare in early September following an innings victory over Worcestershire.

The tournament was contested through two divisions of nine teams each. Each team played the others in their division both home and away, for a total of 16 matches per team. However, the season was significantly disrupted by exceptionally wet weather—notably the wettest summer in 100 years—leading to 82 drawn matches across both divisions and several total abandonments.

Derbyshire won the Division Two title on the final day of the season. They were promoted to Division One for the 2013 season along with runners-up Yorkshire. The bottom two sides from Division One, Worcestershire and the defending 2011 champions Lancashire, were relegated to the second tier.

== Teams ==
Home grounds of each County

=== Division One ===
The following teams competed in Division One during the 2012 season:

Team	Home ground	Captain	Coach/Director of Cricket
Durham	Riverside Ground	(England) Phil Mustard	(England) Geoff Cook
Lancashire	Old Trafford	(England) Glen Chapple	(England) Peter Moores
Middlesex	Lord's	(England) Neil Dexter	(England) Richard Scott
Nottinghamshire	Trent Bridge	(England) Chris Read	(England) Mick Newell
Somerset	County Ground	(England) Marcus Trescothick	(England) Andy Hurry
Surrey	The Oval	(England) Rory Hamilton-Brown	(Australia) Chris Adams
Sussex	County Ground	(England) Michael Yardy	(England) Mark Robinson
Warwickshire	Edgbaston	(England) Jim Troughton	(England) Ashley Giles
Worcestershire	New Road	(South Africa) Daryl Mitchell	(England) Steve Rhodes

=== Division Two ===
The following teams competed in Division Two during the 2012 season:

Team	Home ground	Captain	Coach/Director of Cricket
Derbyshire	County Ground	(England) Wayne Madsen	(England) Karl Krikken
Essex	County Ground	(England) James Foster	(England) Paul Grayson
Glamorgan	SWALEC Stadium	(England) Mark Wallace	(Australia) Matthew Mott
Gloucestershire	County Ground	(England) Alex Gidman	(England) John Bracewell
Hampshire	Rose Bowl	(England) Jimmy Adams	(England) Giles White
Kent	St Lawrence Ground	(England) James Tredwell	(England) Jimmy Adams
Leicestershire	Grace Road	(England) Matthew Boyce	(England) Phil Whitticase
Northamptonshire	County Ground	(South Africa) Andrew Hall	(England) David Ripley
Yorkshire	Headingley	(England) Andrew Gale	(Australia) Jason Gillespie

== Standings ==
- Pld = Played, W = Wins, L = Losses, D = Draws, T = Ties, A = Abandonments, Bat = Batting points, Bowl = Bowling points, Ded = Deducted points, Pts = Points.

Teams receive 16 points for a win and 3 for a draw. Bonus points (a maximum of 5 batting points and 3 bowling points) may be scored during the first 110 overs of each team's first innings.

=== Division One ===
Team	P	W	L	D	A	Bat	Bowl	Ded	Pts
Warwickshire (C)	16	6	1	9	0	43	45	0.0	211
Somerset	16	5	1	10	0	32	45	0.0	187
Middlesex	16	5	4	7	0	33	38	0.0	172
Sussex	16	5	5	6	0	28	41	0.0	167
Nottinghamshire	16	4	2	10	0	26	43	0.0	163
Durham	16	5	5	5	1	18	45	4.0	157
Surrey	16	3	4	8	1	26	40	2.0	139
Lancashire (R)	16	1	5	10	0	25	35	0.0	106
Worcestershire (R)	16	1	8	7	0	17	42	0.0	96

=== Division Two ===
Team	P	W	L	D	A	Bat	Bowl	Ded	Pts
Derbyshire (C, P)	16	6	2	8	0	31	43	0.0	194
Yorkshire (P)	16	5	0	11	0	41	40	0.0	194
Kent	16	4	3	9	0	39	40	0.0	170
Hampshire	16	4	5	7	0	28	40	0.0	153
Essex	16	3	3	10	0	27	40	0.0	145
Glamorgan	16	3	6	6	1	28	35	1.0	131
Leicestershire	16	3	3	10	0	24	33	5.0	130
Northamptonshire	16	2	5	9	0	37	34	0.0	130
Gloucestershire	16	3	6	6	1	22	35	0.0	126

== Results summary ==
The fixtures for 2012 were announced in November 2011.

=== Division One ===
	Durham	Lancashire	Middlesex	Nottinghamshire	Somerset	Surrey	Sussex	Warwickshire	Worcestershire
Durham		30 May - 2 Jun; Lancashire; 2 wickets	27-30 Jul; Durham; 15 runs	12-15 Apr; Nottinghamshire; 114 runs	9–12 May; Match drawn	7-10 Aug; Durham inns & 38 runs	11-14 Sep; Durham; 5 wickets	5-8 Jun; Match drawn	21-24 Aug; Durham; 6 wickets
Lancashire	28-31 Aug; Match drawn		23–26 May; Match drawn	2–5 May; Nottinghamshire; 185 runs	1-4 Aug; Match drawn	11-14 Sep; Match drawn	12-15 Apr; Sussex; 10 wickets	19-22 Apr; Warwickshire; 5 wickets	18-21 Jul; Worcestershire; 205 runs
Middlesex	19-22 Apr; Match drawn	4-7 Sep; Middlesex; 109 runs		11-14 Jul; Match drawn	5-8 Jun; Match drawn	12-15 Apr; Middlesex; 3 runs	30 May - 2 Jun; Middlesex; 10 wickets	1-4 Aug; Match drawn	3–6 May; Middlesex; 132 runs
Nottinghamshire	15-18 Aug; Durham; 16 runs	6-9 Jun; Match drawn	9–12 May; Match drawn		19-22 Apr; Match drawn	18-21 Jul; Match drawn	27-30 Jul; Match drawn	11-14 Sep; Match drawn	5-8 Apr; Nottinghamshire; 92 runs
Somerset	22–25 May; Somerset; 5 wickets	11-14 Jul; Somerset; 9 wickets	21-24 Aug; Match drawn	4-7 Sep; Match drawn		30 May - 2 Jun; Match drawn	11-14 Sep; Match drawn	12-15 Apr; Match drawn	7-10 Aug; Somerset; 9 wickets
Surrey	19-22 Apr; Durham; 8 wickets	9–12 May; Match drawn	28-31 Aug; Match drawn	23–26 May; Surrey; 10 wickets	12-15 Sep; Match drawn		6-9 Jun; Sussex; 7 wickets	11-14 Jul; Match drawn	4-7 Sep; Surrey inns & 3 runs
Sussex	3–6 May; Match drawn	7-10 Aug; Match drawn	15-18 Aug; Sussex inns & 18 runs	23–26 May; Nottinghamshire; 6 wickets	2–5 May; Somerset; 7 wickets	19-22 Jul; Sussex inns & 109 runs		28-31 Aug; Warwickshire inns & 24 runs	5-8 Jun; Sussex inns & 157 runs
Warwickshire	18-21 Jul; Match drawn	15-18 Aug; Warwickshire inns & 103 runs	9–12 May; Middlesex; 7 wickets	30 May - 2 Jun; Warwickshire; 10 wickets	27-30 Jul; Match drawn	3–6 May; Warwickshire; 45 runs	4-7 Sep; Match drawn		12-15 Sep; Warwickshire inns & 202 runs
Worcestershire	2–5 May; Durham; 8 wickets	27-30 Jul; Match drawn	11-14 Sep; Match drawn	22–25 May; Match drawn	19-22 Apr; Match drawn	15-18 Aug; Match drawn	11-14 Jul; Sussex inns & 100 runs	7-10 Aug; Warwickshire; 10 wickets	

=== Division Two ===
	Derbyshire	Essex	Glamorgan	Gloucestershire	Hampshire	Kent	Leicestershire	Northamptonshire	Yorkshire
Derbyshire		11–14 Jul; Match drawn	22–25 May; Derbyshire; 9 wickets	11–14 Sep; Match drawn	15–18 Aug; Derbyshire inns & 5 runs	19–22 Apr; Match drawn	30 May – 2 Jun; Derbyshire; 4 wickets	28–31 Aug; Match drawn	5–8 Apr; Match drawn
Essex	2–5 May; Derbyshire; 5 wickets		4–7 Sep; Match drawn	15–18 Aug; Essex inns & 11 runs	30 May – 2 Jun; Hampshire; 6 wickets	11–14 Sep; Essex; 9 wickets	22–25 May; Match drawn	12–15 Apr; Match drawn	27–30 Jul; Match drawn
Glamorgan	7–10 Aug; Derbyshire; 143 runs	19–22 Jul; Match drawn		12–15 Apr; Glamorgan; 43 runs	2–5 May; Hampshire inns & 3 runs	15–18 Aug; Match drawn	11–14 Jul; Match drawn	30 May – 2 Jun; Match drawn	12–15 Sep; Match drawn
Gloucestershire	12–15 Apr; Derbyshire; 62 runs	6–9 Jun; Match drawn	31 Aug – 3 Sep; Gloucestershire; 8 wickets		11–14 Jul; Match drawn	3–6 May; Gloucestershire; 7 wickets	7–10 Aug; Leicestershire inns & 52 runs	23–26 May; Match drawn	18–21 Jul; Yorkshire; 40 runs
Hampshire	4–7 Sep; Match drawn	19–22 Apr; Hampshire; 10 wickets	28–31 Aug; Hampshire; 139 runs	22–25 May; Gloucestershire; 8 wickets		6–9 Jun; Match drawn	12–15 Apr; Match drawn	18–21 Jul; Match drawn	9–12 May; Match drawn
Kent	27–30 Jul; Kent; 9 wickets	9–12 May; Essex; 5 wickets	30 May – 2 Jun; Kent inns & 94 runs	18–21 Jul; Match drawn	4–7 Sep; Kent inns & 24 runs		2–5 May; Match drawn	7–10 Aug; Kent; 8 wickets	22–25 May; Match drawn
Leicestershire	19–22 Jul; Match drawn	28–31 Aug; Match drawn	19–22 Apr; Leicestershire; 10 wickets	9–12 May; Match drawn	12–15 Sep; Leicestershire inns & 2 runs	27–30 Jul; Match drawn		6–9 Jun; Match drawn	30 May – 2 Jun; Match drawn
Northamptonshire	6–9 Jun; Derbyshire; 4 wickets	7–10 Aug; Essex inns & 47 runs	11–14 Sep; Northamptonshire; 6 wickets	19–22 Jul; Northamptonshire inns & 100 runs	3–6 May; Hampshire; 8 wickets	22–25 May; Kent; 9 wickets	11–14 Jul; Match drawn		4–7 Sep; Match drawn
Yorkshire	28–31 Aug; Match drawn	11–14 Jul; Yorkshire; 6 wickets	15–18 Aug; Yorkshire; 8 wickets	7–10 Aug; Match drawn	11–14 Sep; Match drawn	12–15 Apr; Match drawn	3–6 May; Yorkshire; 10 wickets	19–22 Apr; Yorkshire inns & 110 runs	

== Results in full ==
Complete match reports and scorecards for all fixtures in both divisions are available via the official ECB and ESPNcricinfo archives.

=== Division One ===
Click [show] to view all Division One match results
Date	Venue	Result
5–8 April	The Oval, London	Surrey (264 & 273) beat Sussex (196 & 255) by 86 runs.
5–8 April	Trent Bridge, Nottingham	Nottinghamshire (118 & 403) beat Worcestershire (130 & 299) by 92 runs.
12–15 April	Lord's, London	Middlesex (256 & 106) beat Surrey (222 & 137) by 3 runs.
12–15 April	Edgbaston, Birmingham	Warwickshire (243 & 262/8) beat Somerset (147 & 354) by 2 wickets.
12–15 April	Riverside Ground, Chester-le-Street	Nottinghamshire (161 & 335) beat Durham (129 & 253) by 114 runs.
12–15 April	Aigburth, Liverpool	Sussex (300 & 4/0) beat Lancashire (124 & 176) by 10 wickets.
2–5 May	Old Trafford, Manchester	Nottinghamshire (385 & 143/3d) beat Lancashire (190 & 153) by 185 runs.
23–26 May	The Oval, London	Surrey (457) beat Nottinghamshire (164 & 246) by an innings and 47 runs.
15–18 August	Edgbaston, Birmingham	Warwickshire (471/8d) beat Lancashire (179 & 189) by an innings and 103 runs.
11–14 September	Edgbaston, Birmingham	Warwickshire (420) beat Worcestershire (134 & 84) by an innings and 202 runs to clinch the title.

=== Division Two ===
Click [show] to view all Division Two match results
Date	Venue	Result
5–8 April	Derby	Derbyshire (244 & 123/2) drew with Yorkshire (228).
12–15 April	Grace Road, Leicester	Leicestershire (295 & 232/6d) drew with Hampshire (202 & 23/1).
19–22 April	Headingley, Leeds	Yorkshire (403/9d) beat Northamptonshire (115 & 178) by an innings and 110 runs.
2–5 May	SWALEC Stadium, Cardiff	Hampshire (400) beat Glamorgan (148 & 249) by an innings and 3 runs.
30 May – 2 June	St Lawrence Ground, Canterbury	Kent (489) beat Glamorgan (207 & 188) by an innings and 94 runs.
11–14 September	Derby	Derbyshire (275 & 197/4) beat Hampshire (272 & 198) by 6 wickets to clinch the Division Two title.
11–14 September	Chelmsford	Essex (437/9d) beat Kent (226 & 202) by 9 wickets.

== Statistics ==
=== Division One ===
Individual performances in Division One were led by Somerset's Nick Compton and Durham's Graham Onions.

==== Most runs ====
Player	Team	Mat	Inns	Runs	Ave	100s	50s
(England) Nick Compton	Somerset	11	18	1,191	99.25	5	2
(England) Varun Chopra	Warwickshire	15	23	1,012	53.26	3	3
(England) James Taylor	Nottinghamshire	13	22	915	50.83	2	4
(Australia) Phil Hughes	Worcestershire	9	17	902	60.13	3	3
(England) Chris Read	Nottinghamshire	15	21	891	49.50	3	3

==== Most wickets ====
Player	Team	Mat	Wkts	Ave	BBI	5w
(England) Graham Onions	Durham	11	64	14.98	9/67	6
(England) Chris Wright	Warwickshire	15	62	24.32	5/52	3
(England) Keith Barker	Warwickshire	14	56	20.91	5/45	2
(Australia) Steve Magoffin	Sussex	11	51	18.52	8/20	3
(England) Toby Roland-Jones	Middlesex	11	48	21.08	5/44	4

=== Division Two ===
Statistics for Division Two highlight the leading performances from the second tier, including David Balcombe's 64 wickets.

==== Most runs ====
Player	Team	Mat	Inns	Runs	Ave	100s	50s
(England) Jimmy Adams	Hampshire	15	24	987	47.00	2	5
(England) Joe Root	Yorkshire	15	22	937	46.85	1	6
(South Africa) Wayne Madsen	Derbyshire	16	24	905	43.09	1	5
(England) James Foster	Essex	15	20	885	59.00	2	4
(Cricket West Indies) Brendan Nash	Kent	10	16	872	72.66	3	4

==== Most wickets ====
Player	Team	Mat	Wkts	Ave	BBI	5w
(England) David Balcombe	Hampshire	13	64	20.31	8/71	4
(Sri Lanka) Chaminda Vaas	Northamptonshire	15	52	20.94	5/41	2
(England) Matt Coles	Kent	14	52	23.36	6/44	2
(England) Mark Footitt	Derbyshire	11	46	19.34	6/56	2
(England) Charlie Shreck	Kent	16	46	29.58	4/44	0

== Awards ==
The following individual awards were presented at the conclusion of the 2012 season, recognizing the leading performers in the County Championship and domestic cricket.

Award	Winner	Team	Achievement
PCA Player of the Year	(England) Nick Compton	Somerset	Scored 1,191 runs at an average of 99.25 in Division One.
PCA Young Player of the Year	(England) Joe Root	Yorkshire	Scored 937 runs in Division Two and helped secure promotion.
Cricket Writers' Club County Championship Player of the Year	(England) Nick Compton	Somerset	Voted the best player specifically within the four-day format.
Cricket Writers' Club Young Cricketer of the Year	(England) Joe Root	Yorkshire	Recognized as the most promising young talent in English domestic cricket.
