= Cricket Writers' Club County Championship Player of the Year =

Cricket award

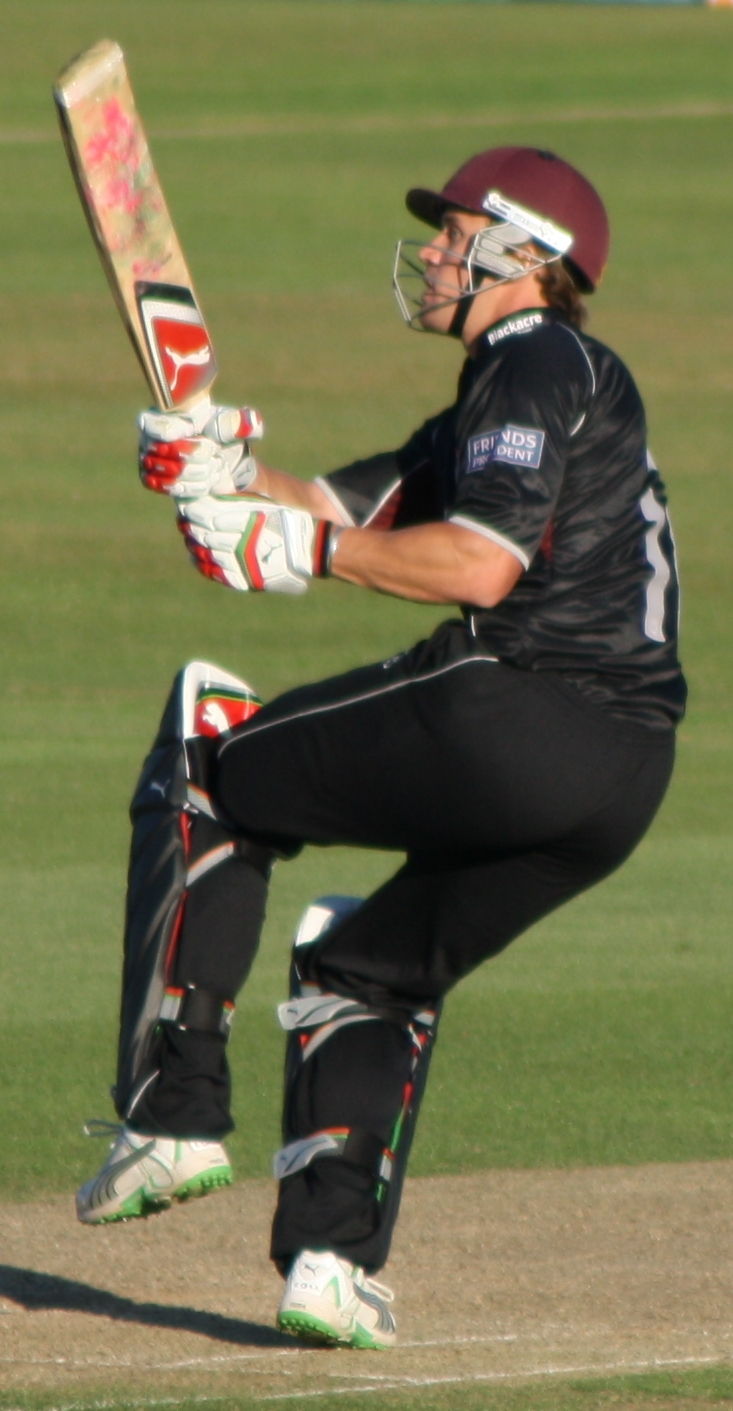
Nick Compton was the inaugural winner, and one of two players to also be named Wisden Cricketer of the Year and PCA Player of the Year for the same season.

The Cricket Writers' Club County Championship Player of the Year is an annual cricket award, presented to the player who is adjudged to have been the best of the year in the County Championship, England's first-class cricket competition. The award has been presented since the 2012 season and the winner is chosen by a vote amongst the members of the Cricket Writers' Club, an association open to "recognised correspondents of newspapers and periodicals and on radio and television". Any male player competing in the County Championship is eligible.

Nick Compton was the first recipient of the award in 2012, and is one of eight winners to have been recognised for their batting exploits: the only bowlers to have won the award were Jamie Porter in 2017, Simon Harmer in 2019 and Luke Fletcher in 2021. Harmer is also one of only two non-English players to have won, along with his South African compatriot Wayne Madsen. Players representing Essex have won the award three times, those from Durham and Yorkshire have won it twice, while no other county has been represented more than once. The most recent winner is Alex Lees, whose 1,347 runs helped Durham to win the Division Two title of the 2023 County Championship.

For six of the 12 seasons that the award has been given, the Cricket Writers' Club County Championship Player of the Year has also been named one of the five Wisden Cricketers of the Year. Three of the winners also claimed awards voted on by the members of the Professional Cricketers' Association (the players' trade union) in the same season; Compton and Lyth won the PCA Player of the Year award in 2012 and 2014, while in 2017, Porter won the PCA Young Player of the Year.

The 2020 award was given for performances in the Bob Willis Trophy, which replaced the County Championship for the shortened 2020 season caused by the COVID-19 pandemic in the United Kingdom.

== Winners ==
Cricket Writers' Club County Championship Players of the Year
Year	Player	Nationality	Club	Other awards that year (Note: Note that Wisden Cricketers of the Year are awarded for the previous year. For the purposes of this list, being named Cricket Writers' Club County Championship Player of the Year in 2012 is equivalent to being named a Wisden Cricketer of the Year in 2013.)	Notes	Ref
2012	Nick Compton	England	Somerset	Wisden Cricketer of the Year; PCA Player of the Year	Scored 1,191 runs	
2013	Wayne Madsen	South Africa (Note: At the time of his award, Madsen was only eligible to play for his native South Africa. He later gained British citizenship and became eligible to play for England.)	Derbyshire		Scored 1,221 runs	
2014	Adam Lyth	England	Yorkshire	Wisden Cricketer of the Year; PCA Player of the Year	Scored 1,489 runs	
2015	Jonny Bairstow	England	Yorkshire	Wisden Cricketer of the Year	Scored 1,108 runs	
2016	Keaton Jennings	England	Durham		Scored 1,548 runs	
2017	Jamie Porter	England	Essex	Wisden Cricketer of the Year; PCA Young Player of the Year	Took 75 wickets	
2018	Rory Burns	England	Surrey	Wisden Cricketer of the Year	Scored 1,359 runs	
2019	Simon Harmer	South Africa	Essex	Wisden Cricketer of the Year	Took 83 wickets	
2020	Alastair Cook	England	Essex		Scored 563 runs	
2021	Luke Fletcher	England	Nottinghamshire		Took 66 wickets	
2022	Keith Barker	England	Hampshire		Took 52 wickets Scored 595 runs	
2023	Alex Lees	England	Durham		Scored 1,347 runs	
2024	Liam Dawson	England	Hampshire	Wisden Cricketer of the Year; PCA Player of the Year	Scored 956 runs Took 54 wickets	
2025	Haseeb Hameed	England	Nottinghamshire	Wisden Cricketer of the Year	Scored 1,258 runs	
