= Reg Hayter =

English cricket journalist (1913–1994)

- Born: Reginald James Hayter; 4 December 1913; Paddington, London, England
- Died: 13 March 1994 (aged 80); Northwood, London
- Education: Marylebone Grammar School
- Occupations: Cricket journalist News agency proprietor
- Employer(s): Hayters (1955-1994); The Cricketer (1978-1981); Press Association; Pardons
- Spouse: Lucy Gray
- Children: 5

Reginald James Hayter (4 December 1913 – 13 March 1994) was an English cricket journalist who founded his own sports reporting agency. He was also editor of The Cricketer from 1978 to 1981.

== Early life and career ==
Born in Paddington, Hayter attended Marylebone Grammar School before joining Pardons, the Press Association's (PA) football and cricket reporting agency, as a junior journalist in 1933. Following a stint with Royal Army Pay Corps during the Second World War, he became the PA's chief cricket reporter as well as covering Marylebone Cricket Club (MCC) overseas tours for Reuters. On these tours he formed close friendships with several of the England players including Denis Compton who he referred to an agent after uncovering hundreds of Compton's unopened correspondence.

== Hayters ==
In February 1955, Hayter formed his own agency named Hayters. He bought out the run-down agency business of retiring Bert Long and set-up in a single room located high above the Strand. The agency provided national and regional newspapers with coverage of sporting matches and events. It grew to became a renowned name in quality sports journalism as well as providing an excellent training ground for many young sports journalists and reporters to learn their trade. It was the starting place for the likes of Albert Sewell (the agency's first employee), Richard Keys, Gary Newbon, Steve Rider, Martin Samuel and Henry Winter. At the time of Hayter's death, four of the national newspaper cricket correspondents had started their career's at Hayters. The agency moved premises several times as it grew but always remained close to Fleet Street.

== Other cricket roles ==
Hayter acted as an agent and advisor to many sportsmen including Basil D'Oliveira, Ian Botham, Tony Greig, Henry Cooper and Bob Wilson. D'Oliveira was particularly grateful for Hayter's assistance as he guided D'Oliveira through the crisis following his selection to tour apartheid South Africa. However Hayter's relationship with Botham and Greig ended sourly, the former switched to Lord Tim Hudson in pursuit of more lucrative opportunities while Hayter was unhappy that Greig had failed to inform him of an approach for World Series Cricket which apparently offended Hayter's traditionalist sensibilities.

Hayter wrote for the Wisden Cricketers' Almanack over many years and also ghost-wrote books for Keith Miller and Ray Lindwall. He was editor of The Cricketer from August 1978 to April 1981, a period in which the magazine reached record circulation numbers.

Hayter played cricket for the British Empire XI during the War and appeared in club cricket for Stanmore into his sixties.. He was a member of the MCC and been made a life member by Surrey County Cricket Club in 1988.

== Personal life and legacy ==
Hayter spoke at Stanmore's annual dinner just two days before his death from cancer. Hayter married Lucy Gray in 1932 and she helped with the accounts in the formative years of the agency as well as raising their five children. One of his sons, Peter, would follow in his footsteps, completing an apprenticeship at Hayters then going on to be cricket correspondent of the 'Mail on Sunday'.

The Professional Cricketers' Association award for Men's Player of the Year is named the Reg Hayter Cup in his honour. There is also a plaque commemorating him at Lord's Media Centre.
