= Marcus Trescothick =

English cricketer (born 1975)

Marcus Trescothick OBE
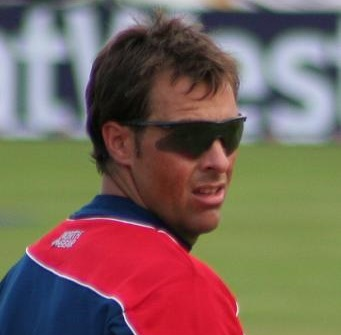
- Trescothick in 2007

Personal information
- Full name: Marcus Edward Trescothick
- Born: 25 December 1975 (age 50); Keynsham, Somerset, England
- Nickname: Tresco, Banger
- Height: 6 ft 2 in (1.88 m)
- Batting: Left-handed
- Bowling: Right-arm medium
- Role: Opening batsman

International information
- National side: England (2000–2006)
- Test debut (cap 603): 3 August 2000 v West Indies
- Last Test: 17 August 2006 v Pakistan
- ODI debut (cap 158): 8 July 2000 v Zimbabwe
- Last ODI: 5 September 2006 v Pakistan
- ODI shirt no.: 23
- T20I debut (cap 10): 13 June 2005 v Australia
- Last T20I: 28 August 2006 v Pakistan
- T20I shirt no.: 23

Domestic team information
- Years: Team
- 1993–2019: Somerset (squad no. 2)

Career statistics
Competition	Test	ODI	FC	LA
Matches	76	123	391	372
Runs scored	5,825	4,335	26,234	12,229
Batting average	43.79	37.37	41.05	37.28
100s/50s	14/29	12/21	66/127	28/63
Top score	219	137	284	184
Balls bowled	300	232	2,704	2,010
Wickets	1	4	36	57
Bowling average	155.00	54.75	43.08	28.84
5 wickets in innings	0	0	0	0
10 wickets in match	0	0	0	0
Best bowling	1/34	2/7	4/36	4/50
Catches/stumpings	95/–	49/–	560/–	149/–
- Source: ESPN Cricinfo, 6 June 2019

Marcus Edward Trescothick (born 25 December 1975) is an English former cricketer who played first-class cricket for Somerset County Cricket Club and represented England in 76 Test matches and 123 One Day Internationals (ODIs). He was Somerset captain from 2010 to 2016 and temporary England captain for several Tests and ODIs. Since retirement, he has commentated and coached at both county and international level.

A left-handed opening batsman, he made his first-class debut for Somerset in 1993 and quickly established himself as a regular member of the team. Seven years later, Trescothick made his ODI debut against Zimbabwe in July 2000. His Test debut, against the West Indies, followed in August. Although former England captain Nasser Hussain likened Trescothick's build and batting temperament to that of Graham Gooch, his stroke play is more reminiscent of David Gower.

An aggressive opener, he once held the record for the most ODI centuries of any English player and fastest half-century in English T20 cricket. Trescothick is also an accomplished slip fielder and occasional right-handed medium pace bowler who kept wicket for England in five ODIs and deputised as England captain for two Test matches and ten ODIs.

Trescothick was an automatic choice for England between 2000 and 2006 before a stress-related illness threatened his career and forced him to pull out of the national squad. He began rebuilding his career with Somerset in 2007 and scored two double centuries that season. However, he remained uneasy about returning to international cricket and announced his retirement from internationals in March 2008, opting to continue playing at county level for Somerset. Media speculation continued as to a possible international return, although Trescothick repeatedly voiced his intent to remain in retirement and has suffered recurrences of his condition in both 2008 and 2009 when Somerset toured abroad. He nevertheless continued to play for Somerset while also working as a commentator and analyst for Sky Sports in the off-season. He finally retired in 2019, holding several Somerset batting records. He is currently the lead batting coach for the England Test team.

== Early years ==
Marcus Edward Trescothick was born on 25 December 1975 in Keynsham, Somerset. He was the younger of two children born to Martyn and Linda Trescothick; his sister, Anna, is three years his senior. His father was a good amateur cricketer and had played two matches for Somerset County Cricket Club's second team and appeared for Bristol and District Cricket Association between 1967 and 1976 before becoming a stalwart at Keynsham Cricket Club, where his mother made the club teas. Trescothick was immersed in cricket from an early age; the notice announcing his birth in the local newspaper had a quote from his father saying "he will have every encouragement to become a cricketer when he grows up", and he received his first cricket bat when he was eleven months old.

During his time at St Anne's primary school, he was chosen to play for the Avon School under-11 (U-11) cricket team. He scored the first century for Avon, striking 124 against Devon and, a couple of weeks, later remained not out on 183 when the coach declared the innings closed; the coach said, "if I let him get a double-hundred at his age, what else would he have to aim for?" That score of 183 created some interest in the local media, and Gloucestershire County Cricket Club invited him to play for its under-11 team. In his second match for the county he scored a century against Somerset—which then discovered that Trescothick, living in Keynsham, was qualified to play for it, and he switched from Gloucestershire to Somerset, proud to play for his father's old county club.

His education continued at the Sir Bernard Lovell School in Oldland Common near Bristol, and by the age of 14, he was playing alongside his father for Keynsham in the Western League. Around the same time, he was selected to play for the England under-14s alongside future international team-mates Andrew Flintoff and Paul Collingwood. In his autobiography, Coming Back to Me, Trescothick recalls that he was bigger than most of the other boys his age, which gave him a strength advantage, enabling him to hit the ball harder and further than others. At the same time, concerns were raised about his "portly" figure, with suggestions that he would need to work on his fitness. The following season, aged 15, Trescothick scored 4,000 runs between all the different teams he was representing, which by this time included the Somerset under-19s. He was named as the "outstanding young cricketer of the year" by The Cricketer. He was nicknamed Tresco and Banger, the latter deriving from his diet as a young player:

My diet was sausages then, in no particular order, sausages, chips, sausages, toast, sausages, beans, sausages, cheese, sausages, eggs, and the occasional sausage.

== Early domestic career ==
Trescothick's first full season at Somerset in 1994 was one of his best, where he scored a total of 925 runs, including two centuries and eight half-centuries at an impressive batting average of 48.63. Having played for the England U-19 cricket team against the West Indies U-19 in 1993, and Sri Lanka U-19 and India U-19 in 1994, Trescothick was named captain for the two Under-19 series against West Indies and South Africa in 1995. His career aggregate of 1,032 runs for England U-19 is second only to John Crawley's 1,058.

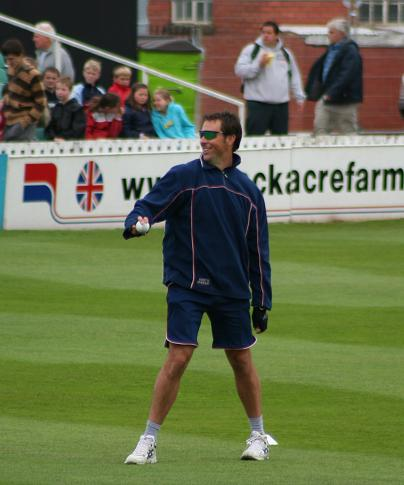
Trescothick warming up at Taunton for Somerset, in June 2007

Trescothick was not as successful in domestic cricket in 1995, although there were still some highlights including an innings of 151 against Northamptonshire (a third of his season's total), and a hat-trick, including the wicket of century-maker Adam Gilchrist, for Somerset against Young Australia. Trescothick's England Under-19 form was still excellent, averaging 74.62 with the bat in six matches. His Under-19 teammates would often mock him for wearing an England blazer after his matches; Trescothick would reply by saying that "it might be the closest I get to playing for England".

The following five years were mixed for Trescothick. Averaging about 30 runs per innings, he was often criticised for a lack of foot movement. David Gower described Trescothick's technique by saying "he does not need to move a long way but needs to move enough. When he is playing well ... he is very good at transferring weight. When he is not playing well, his feet get stuck". However, Trescothick was awarded the NBC Denis Compton Award for Somerset's most promising young county player in the 1996 and 1997 seasons. In 1997, Somerset Second XI were set 612 to win by Warwickshire Second XI, and Trescothick scored 322 to bring the Seconds to 605.

In 1999, Trescothick impressed Glamorgan coach Duncan Fletcher in a county match at Taunton, by scoring 167 in a low-scoring match where the next-highest innings was 50. When England opening batsman Nick Knight sustained a finger injury in 2000, Fletcher, who had been appointed England coach, called on Trescothick to make his England debut in the NatWest Series against Zimbabwe and the West Indies. Trescothick's regular selection for England meant that he was rarely available for domestic selection between 2000 and 2006, often playing only a few matches for Somerset at the start of the season.

== International career ==
=== Debut and centuries on maiden tour ===
Trescothick participated in two England A tours during the winter of 1999, but his full One Day International debut came against Zimbabwe at The Oval on 9 July 2000, when he scored 79. He continued his good form in the tournament with a Man of the Match–winning 87 not out against the West Indies at Chester-le-street, amassing 288 runs at an average of 48.00 and taking two wickets against Zimbabwe at Old Trafford.

As a result of his good form in the NatWest series, Trescothick was given his Test match debut later that summer in the third Test against the West Indies at Old Trafford. He displayed a calm temperament when England lost early wickets, scoring 66 and forming a partnership of 179 with Alec Stewart. Journalist Thrasy Petropoulos observed that there was "poise and durability...just as there had been enterprise and verve to his impressive start in the one-day arena". He ended the Test series with an average of 47.50.

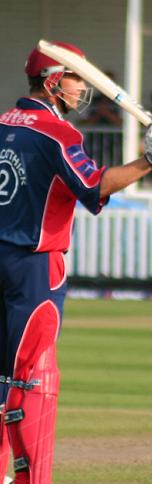
Trescothick celebrates scoring a limited-overs half-century

England began the 2000–2001 winter tour with the 2000 ICC KnockOut Trophy at Nairobi Gymkhana Club. Trescothick did not score highly in the tournament, and England were knocked out at the quarter-final stage against South Africa. Trescothick was named the Professional Cricketers' Association Player of the Year for his performances for Somerset throughout 2000.

Trescothick's maiden international century came against the Sindh Governor's XI in October 2000, during the first warm-up match to the Pakistan series. Trescothick reached his highest score (71) of the three Test matches in the opening innings of the first Test. He took his sole Test wicket in the third Test, when Ashley Giles caught the Pakistan opener Imran Nazir.

Trescothick began the England in Sri Lanka tour with a century against a Sri Lanka 'Colts XI'. He was the top scorer in both innings of the first Test with 122 and 57, although this was overshadowed by Marvan Atapattu's 201 not out in Sri Lanka's innings. Trescothick averaged 41.33 in the Test series, but only 16.00 in the three subsequent ODIs.

England played two Test matches against Pakistan in June 2001. Although Trescothick scored 117 in the second Test, it was not enough for England to win the match. His ODI form improved at the start of the 2001 NatWest Series against Australia and Pakistan, with scores of 69 and 137 respectively. However, his series ended with two consecutive ducks, and England lost all their matches in the tournament.

=== England's leading batsman, 2001–02 ===
Although Trescothick was England's second-highest run scorer in the 2001 Ashes series, he displayed a tendency to give his wicket away when "well set". England lost the series 4–1, with the majority of the England batsmen's contributions being overshadowed by Mark Butcher's 173 not out to win the fourth Test. Trescothick's apparent inability to make major scores was again apparent in the 2001–02 One Day International series in Zimbabwe, where he only passed 50 on one occasion despite scoring consistently. He also captained the team for the first time in this series, deputising for the injured Nasser Hussain.

Trescothick really came into his own on the winter tour of India in 2001. The three-Test series saw him averaging 48.00, with a highest score of 99. He was England's best batsman in the ODI series, averaging 53.00 with a strike rate of over 100. He scored a century in the first ODI, although England lost by 22 runs. He established a reputation for keeping his composure while the rest of the team were failing; at this point, none of Trescothick's four international centuries had resulted in an England win. He was also man-of-the-match in the final ODI, setting up an England victory, with 95 runs from 80 balls. This tour established Trescothick's reputation as one of England's best batsmen against spin bowling: according to David Gower, he was "judging line and length very well". Indian Cricket named him one of their five Cricketers of the Year for 2002. The following tour of New Zealand was less successful for Trescothick, only once reaching double figures in a poor ODI series, coupled with an average Test match performance.

Trescothick had been playing well in 2002, scoring 161 in the Sri Lankan series and being awarded the Player of the Series in the tri-nation NatWest Series (including a century in the final), until his season was cut short when he suffered a fractured thumb whilst fielding. He returned for the fourth Test against India, scoring two half-centuries. Trescothick had mixed fortunes in the 2002 ICC Champions Trophy; he followed his century in the NatWest final with a man-of-the-match winning 119 against Zimbabwe, but failed to score as England lost to India and exited the tournament.

In October, Trescothick was one of 11 players awarded "central contracts" by the ECB, which compensate a player's county for their lack of domestic appearances.

Trescothick was overshadowed by Michael Vaughan during the 2002–03 Ashes series, averaging only 26.10 with a top score of 72 in comparison to Vaughan's average of 63.30 and three centuries. Trescothick averaged 31.60 across 10 matches in the VB Series, but England were outplayed by Australia throughout the tour. Trescothick failed to excel in the 2003 World Cup as England failed to qualify for the knock-out stages. In his five matches, Trescothick's top score was 58 against Namibia, with a tournament average of 23.20.

=== Continued success in 2003 and 2004 ===
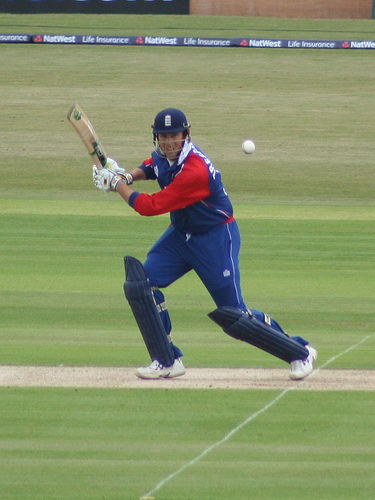
Trescothick was a successful left-handed opening batsman for England for a number of years.

Trescothick played well against a weak Zimbabwe team in the two-Test series in May–June 2003, and scored an unbeaten century in the three ODIs against Pakistan averaging over 100. His form continued in the 2003 NatWest Series, with 114 not out against South Africa. The opening stand with Vikram Solanki of 200 runs was the highest first-wicket partnership for England and provided the first instance of both England openers scoring centuries in the same innings. Trescothick maintained his form in the South Africa Test matches; a career-best 219 at The Oval completed a successful series in which he averaged 60.87.

In Bangladesh, scores in the nineties against both the President's XI and Bangladesh A were followed by a century in the first Test, and 60 in the second. He scored one half-century in the three ODIs, although England only used five batsman in the comfortable victories. England played poorly against Sri Lanka, with Trescothick finding it hard to build a large innings. He attempted to take control of the match with 70 at Colombo, as England tried to get something from the series, but was also criticised for poor catching.

His form in the tour to the West Indies in March and April 2004 was mixed. After several low scores in the Test series—Trescothick began with only 20 runs from his first five innings—he reached two half-centuries, but failed to make a substantial match-winning contribution. This poor touring form may have been the start of the troubles that would rule him out of international cricket in the future. Trescothick said, "The hardest thing for me has been the pitches. So far nets and the matches have been on average surfaces and runs have been hard work...In England you get used to good practice surfaces so the rhythm of batting comes pretty easy [sic]". However, he topped the England batting averages in the 7-match one-day series, with 267 runs including 130 in the 5th ODI and 82 from 57 balls in the 7th.

Back in England, Trescothick was called upon to captain England after Michael Vaughan sustained a knee injury. Although other England captains had seemed to suffer a lack of batting form, the extra authority did not affect Trescothick, and he forged a good partnership with debutant Andrew Strauss against New Zealand. This understanding developed in the second Test with a first-wicket partnership of 153; Trescothick went on to score 132, his sixth Test century. Trescothick's partnerships with Strauss were to average 52.35 in 52 innings. His first century against the West Indies followed in the second Test, and Trescothick became the first player to make centuries in both innings of a Test match at Edgbaston, and the ninth England player to score a century in each innings of a Test match. Trescothick was again England's best One Day International batsman in the 2004 ICC Champions Trophy, scoring 261 runs in just four innings, including a century in the final; he also took his fourth ODI wicket.

=== 2004 and 2005 Ashes ===
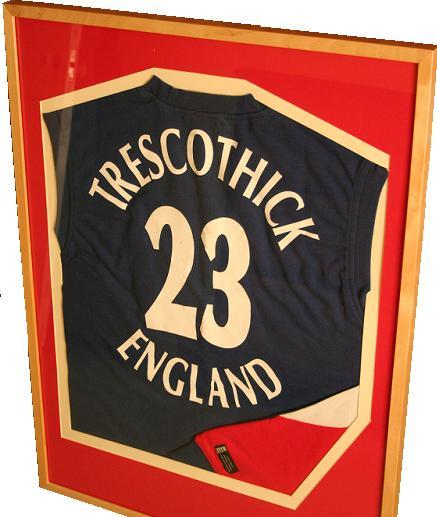
Trescothick's England ODI shirt

The 2004–05 tour of Zimbabwe caused several players to voice their concerns about the Robert Mugabe regime, the security issues in the country, and the standard of the Zimbabwean team. Steve Harmison was the first to boycott the tour for "political and sporting reasons", and Flintoff was reported to be considering taking a moral stand himself. The England Chairman of Selectors, David Graveney, denied that the selectors would omit players who were unhappy with touring Zimbabwe and would put their absences down to injury. Flintoff and Trescothick were, however, "rested", allowing Kevin Pietersen to make his debut.

Trescothick used the time to prepare for the following series in South Africa, even taking up yoga in an attempt to bolster his performances abroad. In December 2004, he made 85 not out against an N.F. Oppenheimer XI in South Africa. A partnership of 152 with Strauss in the opening Test against South Africa was followed by a partnership of 273 in the second, in which they both scored over 130. This was a record opening partnership at Durban and England's first 200 opening stand since Gooch and Mike Atherton in 1991. Before this, the difference between his home and abroad average was over 20, and his third overseas century went a long way to counter this. With regard to his touring difficulties, Trescothick stated: "I wouldn't say I've put it to rest, but I've made a big step forward to putting it to rest. It's a mental battle for me, something I have to deal with and work hard to try to understand what is different. He made a further improvement with an even larger score of 180, as England won the fourth Test. After batting slowly alongside Ashley Giles, the fall of Matthew Hoggard's wicket soon afterward spurred Trescothick to start "unleashing ferocious shots", setting up an unlikely victory with Steve Harmison partnering him. In the matches preceding the 2005 Ashes series, England wrapped up two easy victories against Bangladesh. Trescothick scored 194 in the first Test, and 151 in the second. He also scored an unbeaten 100 in his 100th ODI against Bangladesh, surpassing Gooch's record of eight ODI centuries for England.

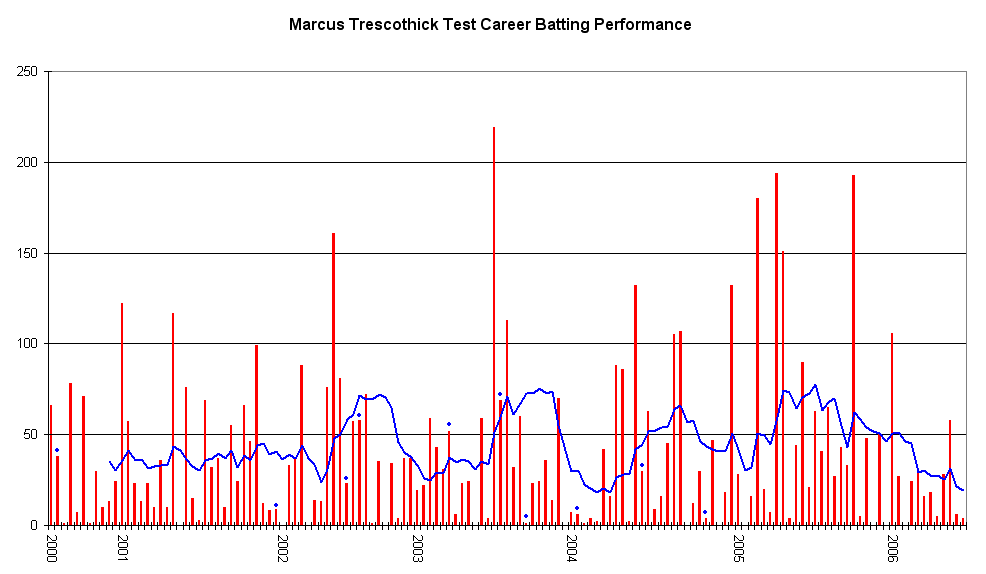
An innings-by-innings breakdown of Trescothick's Test match batting career, showing runs scored (red bars) and the average of the last ten innings (blue line)

Trescothick fared better in 2005 than in the previous Ashes series, becoming the second highest run scorer in the series (behind the prolific Kevin Pietersen). During the third Test, he became the fastest player to reach 5,000 runs in Test cricket, and also achieved the notable feat of scoring over 1,000 Test runs in a calendar year for the third consecutive year: 1,004 in 2003, 1,003 in 2004, and 1,323 in 2005. He also had the dubious honour of becoming both Glenn McGrath's 500th and Shane Warne's 600th Test wicket during the series. Trescothick was named as one of the five Wisden Cricketers of the Year for his achievements in 2005, and was awarded an MBE in the 2006 New Year honours list with the rest of the English team.

For the Test series against Pakistan, Trescothick was offered the captaincy once more due to an injury to Vaughan. He was unsure whether to accept but realised that as "unofficial second in command ... I believe it was the right thing to step up. It is exciting to think I could be in charge for a few weeks ... I know there is a chance I maybe won't be a one-match wonder this time – it could be the whole series, but being very close to Michael, I've seen the things it [captaincy] does to you". As it transpired, Trescothick scored 193 in the first innings (although England lost the match), and Vaughan returned for the second Test. Trescothick had considered leaving the tour early when his father-in-law had a serious accident, but stayed in Pakistan as fellow opener Andrew Strauss returned home to attend the birth of his first child.

== Illness and depression throughout 2006 ==
During England's tour of India in February 2006, Trescothick abruptly returned home citing personal reasons. He later blamed a virus.

Trescothick returned to Test cricket in May, scoring 106 against Sri Lanka to become the first Test centurion of the 2006 English season. The century proved to be the high point of Trescothick's Test summer, however he reached a half-century just once in the subsequent six Tests against Sri Lanka and Pakistan. This run of form was lifted later in the year by two ODI centuries, one apiece against Ireland and Sri Lanka. In September, he withdrew from the remaining ODIs against Pakistan and asked not to be considered for the forthcoming ICC Champions Trophy squad because of a stress-related illness. It was later believed likely that Trescothick had been suffering from clinical depression, which was also the cause of much of his trouble throughout 2006.

Returning once again to the international arena, Trescothick was included in the squad for the 2006–07 Ashes in Australia, and played in the first two tour matches against the Prime Minister's XI and New South Wales. On 14 November, following the match against New South Wales, England announced Trescothick was flying home due to a "recurrence of a stress-related illness". Geoffrey Boycott later stated that depression amongst cricketers is rarely documented, but with the current congested ICC schedule, player "burnout" and similar illnesses were becoming more commonplace.

Trescothick's uncertainty over his place in the England squad drew varied criticism. However, he also received support from respected players, including Somerset captain Justin Langer, Alec Stewart, Mike Gatting, and Bob Woolmer.

== Recovery then international retirement in 2007–2008 ==
Trescothick ended some speculation about his international career by announcing that he would like to be considered for a place in the national team in the future. England's management staff continued to support him, and named him in the initial 25-man squad for the 2007 Test series against the West Indies. Having recovered from a double hernia operation, and proving himself fit for the start of the county season, Trescothick began his comeback to cricket by scoring 256 from 117 balls in a 50 over match against Devon in April 2007.

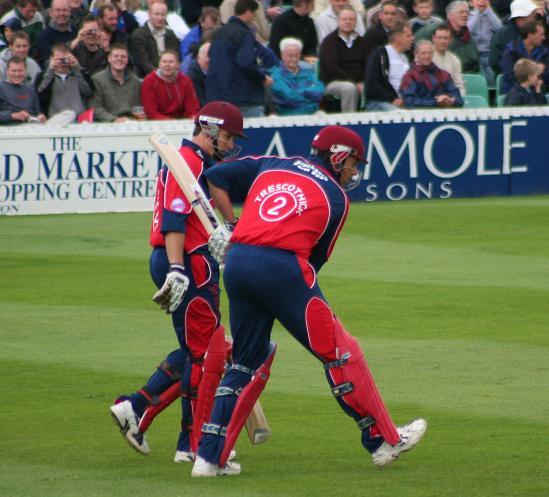
Somerset opening batsmen Matthew Wood and Trescothick, who had a "prolific" 2007 domestic season

His comeback to the County Championship continued with a 44-ball half-century against Middlesex on 19 April 2007, while in May he hit a career-best 284 against Northamptonshire, although Trescothick stated then that he did not feel ready for an international Test match position. Trescothick followed this double century with a knock of 76 off 35 balls against Northamptonshire, with five fours and seven sixes.

Debate over Trescothick's place in the England squad continued amid an end-of-series reshuffle in the England batting line-up. This included the dropping of fellow opener Strauss from the one-day team, and the rise of Alastair Cook as a Test and ODI opener for England. Trescothick stated that he would see how he progressed before committing to the international scene: "Of course I'd love to play for England again ... . Clearly, if I want to continue my career I have to undertake another tour. But for now, if and when I get back to full fitness and I think I am OK and ready to play, I'll make myself available for England". He added that he was "desperate to play for England again" but was waiting until he was "as convinced as I can be that I am ready to take on the challenge of international cricket".

In July 2007, Trescothick was named in the preliminary squad for the Twenty20 World Championship in South Africa, with the full squad to be confirmed on 11 August. However, Trescothick pulled himself out of the squad before the final confirmation date, stating that "[I am] now clear that I should take more time to complete my recovery". The England selectors confirmed that they remained in favour of including Trescothick at some point, looking "forward to his making himself available again for England when the time is right". Trescothick, however, said that he knew England could not wait for him forever, and on 10 September 2007 he went into his second year without an England contract.

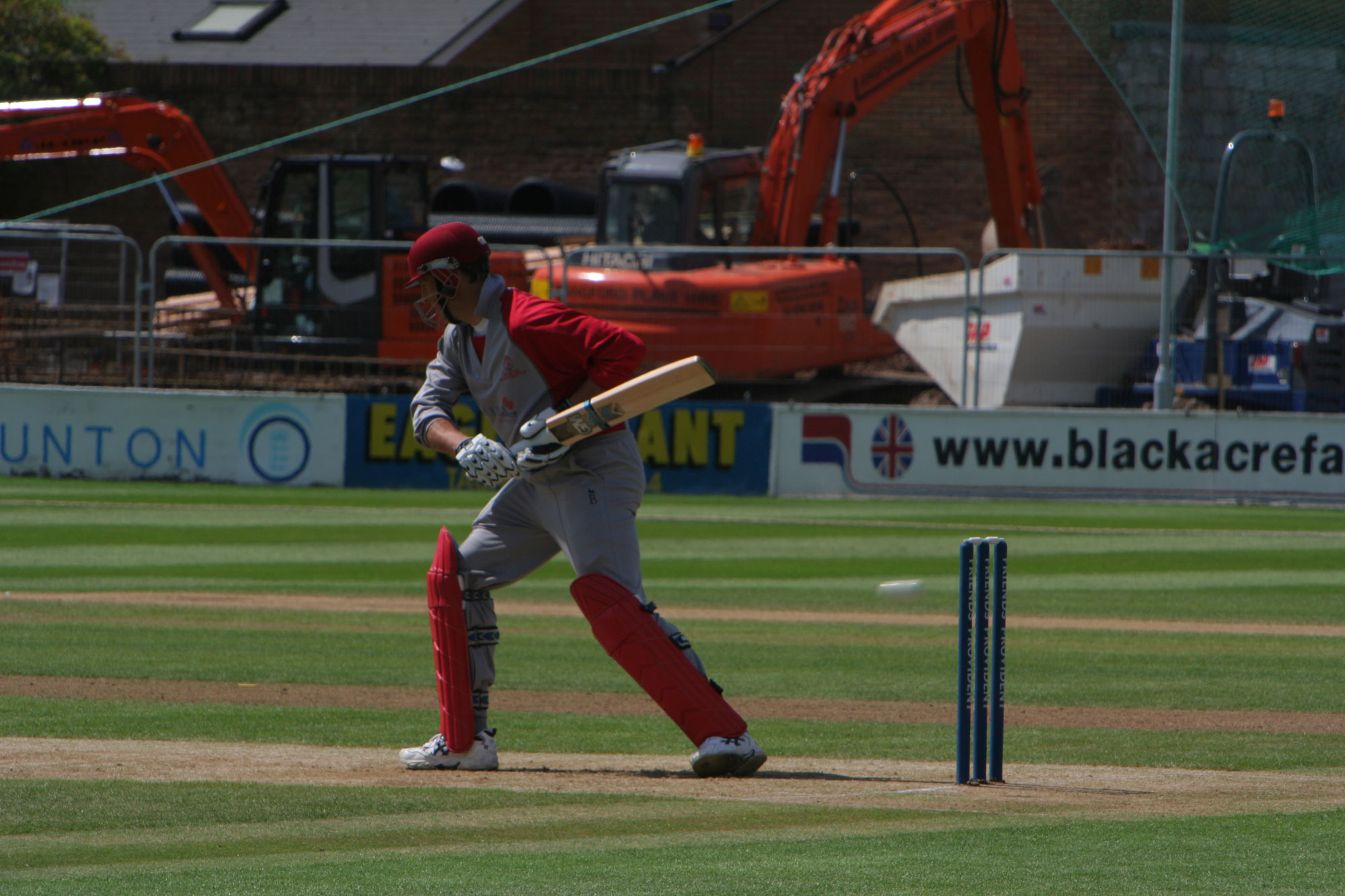
Trescothick leaves a straight ball at Taunton during his benefit year at Somerset in 2008

Meanwhile, his good domestic form continued with a fast 146 and 69 not out during a four-day match against Northamptonshire, giving Somerset an unlikely victory. A score of 49 from 83 balls followed in the four-day match against Nottinghamshire, and a score of 84 from 79 balls against Durham was followed by a man-of-the-match–winning 124 which saw Somerset promoted to the first division of the NatWest Pro40. Of his 2007 season, Somerset director of cricket Brian Rose stated that Trescothick had made "terrific progress". Trescothick maintained prolific form throughout the season despite a foot injury, scoring 1,343 runs at an average of 61.04 to guide Somerset to the Division 2 championship. He was awarded a benefit year in 2008, following on from successful surgery on an injured metatarsal. He remained firm, however, on his decision to stay out of the England team for the sake of his health.

On 15 March 2008, Somerset announced that Trescothick had decided to pull out of the county's pre-season tour of the UAE after suffering a recurrence of his condition, leading many to speculate that, given this latest setback, it seemed increasingly unlikely that Trescothick would represent England again. Somerset's director of cricket Brian Rose, however, stated that he didn't "see the setback as a major problem" and that Trescothick would be able to play for Somerset in the following season, and "for many years" after. He would never return to international level, however, and announced his retirement from international cricket on 22 March 2008. He stated that he had "tried on numerous occasions to make it back to the international stage and it has proved a lot more difficult than [he] expected" and repeated his desire to continue playing domestic cricket. He later stated that it was his decision to withdraw from Somerset's tour of Dubai that prompted his decision.

In response, Angus Fraser wrote, "Obviously, it is sad to see such a dedicated, patriotic and likeable man forced to give up something that patently meant so much to him, but the inner torment that came with attempting to overcome the mental illness that prevented him from touring with England for more than two years had to be brought to an end. It was doing Trescothick and his family no good at all. Representing your country is a source of huge pride, but there are far more important things in life". Fraser also wrote: "It was in Pakistan that Marcus Trescothick's mental illness began to stir and the opener has not played an overseas test since".

After an excellent domestic season for Somerset, including 184 in a 40-over match against Gloucestershire (his highest List A score), In April 2009, Trescothick turned down another request from new England captain Andrew Strauss to consider making himself available for England's World Twenty20 Championship campaign.

== 2008 autobiography ==
Trescothick wrote his autobiography with Peter Hayter, Coming Back to Me, published by HarperCollins on 1 September 2008. In the book, Trescothick explained that he had suffered from anxiety attacks since the age of 10 and that playing domestic cricket meant that, at all times, he was only ever three hours away from his family. He said,

I've not brought it out for people to use as a self-help book, to say this is how you cope with anxiety and depression. It's just to get it out in the open – there have been so many questions left unanswered and I've not helped that process. But this is the opportunity, and I hope people can understand why I did a few things I did.

The book has been widely commended for its honesty, with Trescothick's difficulties drawing comparison with Harold Gimblett's similar mental health problems. Despite attempts by Pietersen to entice Trescothick back into the England set-up, Trescothick confirmed that his decision had been made and that he was putting his health and family first. In November 2008, Coming Back to Me was named the 2008 William Hill Sports Book of the Year. It was also shortlisted for the "Best Autobiography" at the British Sports Book Awards 2009, and the "Biography of the Year" at the 2009 National Book Awards.

== Later county career ==
Trescothick continued his career with Somerset into 2009, having received a benefit year from his county, as well as a new stand in his name. During his benefit year, he averaged 46.59 in the 4-day game, including three centuries, and he started 2009 with 52 against Warwickshire. It was also announced on 20 April 2009 that Trescothick has become a patron of Anxiety UK, following the revelations of his autobiography. As the season progressed, Trescothick found success in all forms of the game. On 1 June, he scored 69 from 47 balls as part of a 129-partnership with Craig Kieswetter against Glamorgan; on 3 June, he scored 52 against Worcestershire; he was stumped five short of his second Championship century of the season against Lancashire and then scored 78 against Yorkshire on 14 June. By 16 June, he had scored a hundred apiece in the Friends Provident Trophy and the County Championship, both with averages in the high 50s. On 31 July, he became the first player in the country to accrue 1,000 first-class runs in the 2009 season during the 1st innings of the County Championship match against Nottinghamshire. He also performed well in the one day arena, taking Somerset to the final of the Twenty20 championship while continuing to reject any suggestions of returning for the final Test of the 2009 Ashes series. He finished the season as the leading run scorer in the County Championship, scoring 1,817 runs. With the departure of Justin Langer, Trescothick was named as Somerset captain from 2010 onwards.

Trescothick was also named Most Valuable Player by the Professional Cricketers' Association for his 2,934 runs in all competitions in the 2009 season, 1,745 of these in the County Championship. Over the winter he starred in a short film to promote Somerset, commissioned by inward investment agency Into Somerset.

=== 2009 Champions League Twenty20 ===
With Somerset runners-up in the English 2009 Twenty20 Cup, Trescothick and his county travelled to India to partake in the Champions League Twenty20 in October. Trescothick was described as having "been in sparkling form all season" and began the tournament under media scrutiny, given his previous difficulties playing on tour. There was speculation regarding any "recurrence of his stress-related illness that originally occurred in 2006", as this was to be his first overseas outing since an aborted attempt in 2008. Langer assured the media that Trescothick could pull out whenever he wished to. Somerset, who began the tour without Trescothick because he was arriving later than most of the squad, commenced their warm up with a victory over the Otago Volts. The opener arrived three days later, confident in his ability to complete the tour. Somerset began with a close victory against the Deccan Chargers on 10 October, winning from the last ball. Trescothick was dismissed for 14 from 12 in his first match outside England since 2006 "after offering a fleeting glimpse of his talent", according to ESPNcricinfo.

Trescothick had a recurrence of his difficulties and returned home on 15 October, citing the same "stress related illness". Trescothick signed a new three-year contract (with an optional fourth year) in December, and was named captain for the 2010 season.

=== Captaincy 2010 – 2015 ===
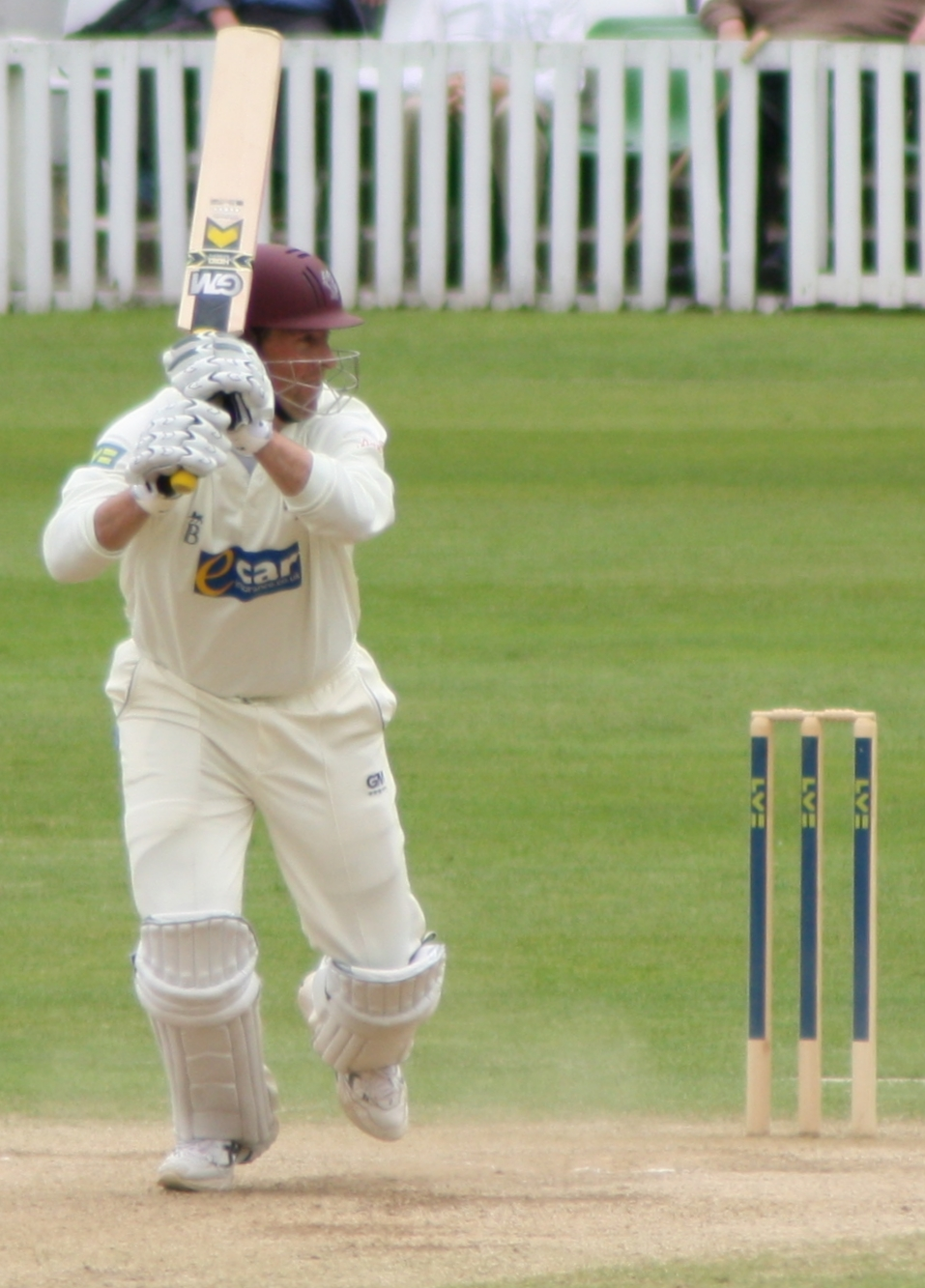
Trescothick batting for Somerset against Yorkshire in 2010

Trescothick led Somerset into the 2010 season as captain, and began strongly in the County Championship with a century and four half-centuries from his first eight games, though he struggled in the newly formed Clydesdale Bank 40 with only 95 runs from the first five matches, and in the Friends Provident T20 173 runs at 21.62 with a best of 50. This half-century came on 25 June, where together with Kieron Pollard helped secure victory over Sussex, and was scored from 31 balls. In a Twenty20 match against Hampshire on 9 July at Taunton, Trescothick hit a half-century from 13 deliveries, including five sixes and five fours – a record fastest fifty in English domestic Twenty20 cricket. He was dismissed for 78 from only 32 balls. He led Somerset to runners-up position for all three English domestic competitions, losing out to Nottinghamshire in the County Championship, Hampshire in the Twenty20 and Warwickshire in the CB40 competition.

In 2011 Trescothick started off the county championship season strongly and was the first batsman in the country to score 1000 championship runs. He was awarded the 2011 season MVP (Most Valuable Player) award for his performances throughout the season. He ended 2011 with six centuries in the County Championship, batting with an average of 79.66 across the year. Somerset earned record financial returns that year, but again failed in the semi-final and final stages of all major competitions.

Across all three formats, Trescothick took 2,518 runs for his county. As 2012 – Trescothick's 19th season at Somerset – approached, there was talk of resting him from the newly formed one-day cricket championship the following year. Trescothick did not travel with the rest of the team to the Champions League T20 in India. He missed part of the 2012 domestic season due to an ankle injury, and struggled for form; he went seven four-day matches without a half-century until passing fifty against Sussex in August and going on to score a century. By the end of the season he had played only five one-day games, scoring 118 runs at 39.33, two T20 matches making only 31 runs in total, and nine County Championship games in which he scored 506 runs at 38.92, including two centuries. This was his lowest home-season aggregate since 1995. He nevertheless made a statement to the media voicing his wish to continue playing into his forties, and took up a winter commentary stint with Sky Sports to cover England's tour of India.

The 2013 season found Trescothick averaging only in the mid-twenties and failed to score a century for the first time since 1998. He remained the second-highest run maker for Somerset, behind only Nick Compton, and retained the captaincy for the 2014 season. He continued as a commentator and analyst for Sky Sports in the off-season, in particular during coverage of the 2014 World T20. He also publicly lent his support to England's Jonathan Trott during the latter's departure from the 2013–14 Ashes series, empathising with Trott's stress-related illness.

Trescothick began the 2014 season strongly. He scored 112 in a warm-up game against Middlesex, followed by 95 against a university team. Subsequent scores of 20, 17 and five in the next three innings prompted George Dobell of ESPNcricinfo to comment that "Trescothick does not look anything like the batsman he once was", but he returned to form on 28 April with a further century against Sussex. It was his first in the County Championship since 2012, and was followed on 22 May with a second hundred, against Durham at Taunton. This century came 618 days after the last time he scored a hundred at his home ground. He passed 1,000 runs for the season on 25 September against Yorkshire, in the final game of the year's County Championship.

In 2015, Trescothick scored over 1,000 runs in the season, including three centuries and eight fifties, and completed the milestone yet again in July 2016 against Nottinghamshire.

=== Continuing career after captaincy ===
In January 2016 after six seasons in the job Trescothick stood down from the Somerset captaincy to let experienced new overseas signing Chris Rogers lead the team. Trescothick finished his first season without the captaincy since retiring from England duty with a season average of over 53 and also became the Somerset cricketer with the highest number of first class catches in the history of the club. He extended his contract with Somerset for the 2017 season, during which he broke the record (previously held by Harold Gimblett) for most first-class centuries for Somerset, and signed another 12-month extension with Somerset in August 2017, to the end of the 2018 season, his 26th season with the county. On 25 September 2018, Trescothick took three consecutive slip catches as Craig Overton registered a hat-trick in the county championship against Notts. It was only the third time in first-class cricket that all three dismissals in a hat-trick had been caught by the same non–wicket-keeping fielder. On 27 June 2019, Trescothick announced that he would retire from professional cricket at the end of the 2019 season. His last on-field appearance came as a substitute fielder in the final few minutes of Somerset's County Championship game against Essex at Taunton on 26 September 2019. He was greeted with a standing ovation and left the field to a guard of honour from the opposition.

== Post-playing career ==
In retirement, Trescothick has served as batting coach for the England Test team. On 30 July 2024, Trescothick was appointed interim head coach of the England white-ball team after Matthew Mott stepped down.

== Career records and statistics ==
=== Test matches ===
Records:

- 1,000 runs in a calendar year: 1,003 (2003), 1,004 (2004), 1,323 (2005)
- First of two players to score a century in both innings at Edgbaston the other being Shai Hope (and the ninth player for England), 2004 v West Indies
- M.A. Aziz Stadium first wicket partnership record: 126 with Michael Vaughan, 2003–04 v Bangladesh
- Century by both openers in same innings, and Kingsmead first wicket partnership record: 273 with Andrew Strauss, 2004–05 v South Africa
- Multan Cricket Stadium second wicket partnership record: 180 with Ian Bell, 2005–06 v Pakistan
- Riverside Ground third wicket partnership record: 155 with Ian Bell, 2005 v Bangladesh
- The Oval third wicket partnership record: 268 with Graham Thorpe, 2003 v South Africa

=== One Day Internationals ===
Records:

- Most consecutive ODIs for England: 92 (8 July 2000 – 25 September 2004)
- Beausejour Stadium fourth wicket partnership record: 110 with Andrew Flintoff, 2003–04 v West Indies
- Bellerive Oval first wicket partnership record: 165 with Nick Knight, 2002–03 v Australia
- Civil Service Cricket Club, Stormont fourth wicket partnership record: 142 with Ian Bell, 2006 v Ireland
- Riverside Ground first wicket partnership record: 171 with Alec Stewart, 2000 v West Indies
- County Ground, Bristol second wicket partnership: 124 with Nick Knight, 2001 v Australia
- England and The Oval first wicket partnership record: 200 with Vikram Solanki, 2003 v South Africa
- Rose Bowl fourth wicket partnership record: 53 with Paul Collingwood, 2004 v Sri Lanka

== Personal life ==
Trescothick married Hayley Rowse in Trull, Somerset, on 24 January 2004, and the couple have two daughters. He lives in Taunton, and also owns property in Barbados, near similar properties owned by Michael Vaughan and Andrew Flintoff. Trescothick is an honorary vice-president of Bristol City F.C., as well as being a keen golfer.

== Honours ==
Trescothick was appointed Member of the Order of the British Empire (MBE) in the 2006 New Year Honours for services to cricket and Officer of the Order of the British Empire (OBE) in the 2024 New Year Honours for services to mental ill health, as mental health ambassador for the Professional Cricketers' Association.

- He was recognised with a Taunton Deane Citizenship Award on 21 September 2005, and was granted the Freedom of his home town, Keynsham, on 3 October 2005.
- In December 2018 Trescothick was awarded the Honorary Doctorate of Health at the winter graduation ceremony of the University of Bath.
- In 2021 Trescothick was awarded Honorary Life Membership of the Marylebone Cricket Club.

Awards
Preceded by Duncan Hamilton	William Hill Sports Book of the Year winner 2008	Succeeded by Duncan Hamilton

Sporting positions
Preceded by Michael Vaughan	English national cricket captain 2004 & 2006 deputising for Michael Vaughan	Succeeded by Michael Vaughan
Preceded by Justin Langer	Somerset County Cricket Captain; 2010–2016	Succeeded by Chris Rogers
