= PCA Player of the Year awards =

Annual cricket awards

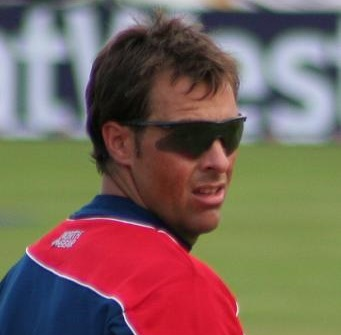
Marcus Trescothick is one of two players to have won the Men's Player of the Year award three times.

The PCA Player of the Year Awards are a set of annual cricket awards. Awards are given for the Men's Player of the Year, Women's Player of the Year, Men's Young Player of the Year and Women's Young Player of the Year, presented to the player who is adjudged to have been the best of the year in their respective category. The winner is chosen by a vote amongst the members of the players' trade union, the Professional Cricketers' Association (PCA).

The Men's Player of the Year award was first awarded in 1970, whilst the Men's Young Player of the Year award began in 1990. An award named the Women's Player of the Summer was first awarded in 2014, presented to a member of the England women's cricket team who was adjudged to have been the best during that summer. However, in 2021, the awarded was opened up to domestic players, and named the Women's Player of the Year. Finally, the Women's Young Player of the Year award was established in 2021.

== History ==
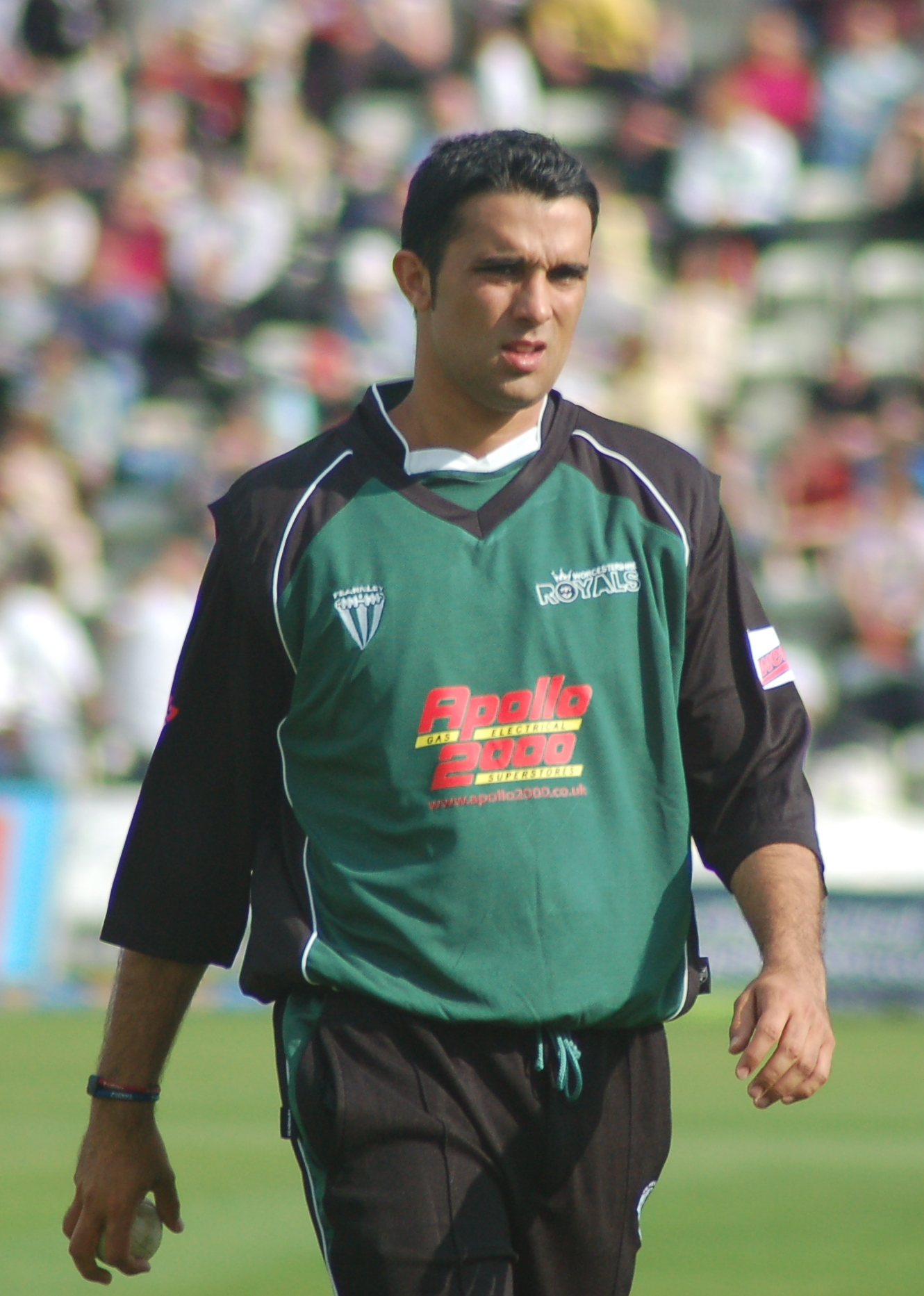
Kabir Ali is one of only two players to have won the Men's Young Player of the Year award twice.

=== Men's Player of the Year ===
The winning player is awarded the Reg Hayter Cup, named after a sports journalist who was also a member of the Marylebone Cricket Club, a Lord's Taverner, and a life-member of Surrey County Cricket Club. With the exception of the first year, when a joint award was made, the award has been bestowed upon one individual each season. The award is well regarded by its recipients; the 2014 winner, Adam Lyth exemplified this by claiming that "it's a very proud moment to be voted for by your peers who you’ve played against all year."

The award was first presented in 1970, when Mike Proctor of Gloucestershire and Jack Bond of Lancashire were joint winners. Seven players have won the award more than once, but only Sir Richard Hadlee (1981, 1984 and 1987) and Marcus Trescothick (2000, 2009 and 2011) have been named Player of the Year on three occasions. Two players, Andrew Flintoff and John Lever, have won the award in consecutive years. Representatives of all eighteen first-class cricket counties have won the award. Gloucestershire players have collected the award most frequently, doing so on six occasions, while four of the counties (Derbyshire, Glamorgan, Leicestershire and Sussex) have only had one winner.

On nineteen occasions, the PCA Player of the Year has also been named one of the five Wisden Cricketers of the Year for that season, and in 2005 Flintoff won the PCA award in the same year as being voted BBC Sports Personality of the Year. The Cricket Writers' Club County Championship Player of the Year was introduced in 2012, and two of the three winners of that award have been the PCA Player of the Year at the same time.

=== Men's Young Player of the Year ===
The winning player is awarded the John Arlott Cup, named after John Arlott, a cricket journalist and commentator. The award is presented to the player who is adjudged to be the most promising young player in English county cricket. Only players that are aged under 24 on 1 April of the awarding year are eligible for the prize.

Michael Atherton was the first winner of the award in 1990. Two players, Kabir Ali and Alastair Cook, have won the award twice, both doing so in successive years; Ali in 2002 and 2003, and Cook in 2005 and 2006. Representatives of thirteen of the eighteen first-class counties have won the award. Yorkshire players have collected the most awards, doing so on six occasions.

On three occasions the PCA Young Player of the Year has also been named one of the five Wisden Cricketers of the Year; Atherton in 1990, Ben Duckett in 2016 and Jamie Porter in 2017. Duckett is the only player to have won both major PCA awards in the same year, as he was also named PCA Player of the Year in 2016. As of 2021, 18 of the 31 winners have also collected the Cricket Writers' Club Young Cricketer of the Year award, chosen by members of the Cricket Writers' Club, an association of cricket journalists.

=== Women's Player of the Year ===
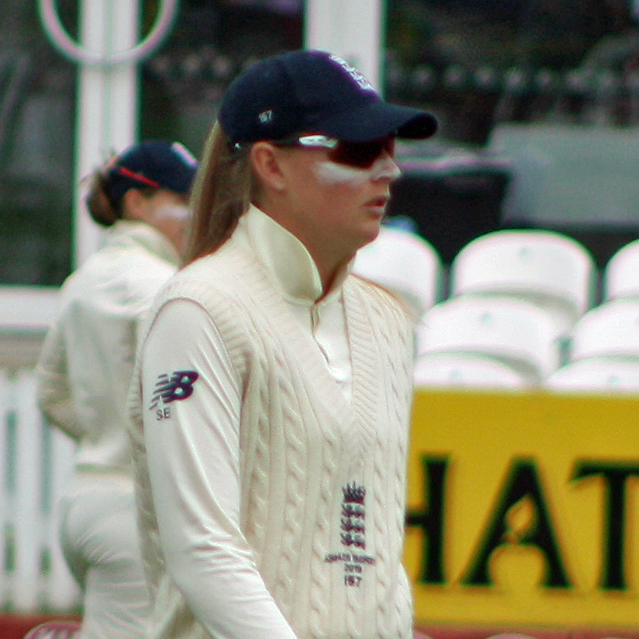
Sophie Ecclestone is the only player to have won the Women's Player of the Year award twice.

First awarded in 2014, the award was originally presented to the member of the England women's cricket team who is adjudged to have been the best of the English summer, as per a vote amongst the members of the team, as the Women's Player of the Summer. Prior to 2014, women had not held professional contracts, and so had not been eligible for membership of the players' trade union, the Professional Cricketers' Association (PCA). With the professionalisation of parts of the domestic game during 2020, the award was opened up to domestic players for the 2021 award, with Evelyn Jones becoming the first Women's Player of the Year for her performances for Central Sparks and Birmingham Phoenix.

=== Women's Young Player of the Year ===
The award was first introduced in 2021, again as part of the further professionalisation of women's domestic cricket. The first winner was Alice Capsey of South East Stars and Oval Invincibles, who was not a professional cricketer or PCA member at the time of her win.

== Winners ==
Winners of PCA Player of the Year awards
Year	Men's Player of the Year		Men's Young Player of the Year		Women's Player of the Year		Women's Young Player of the Year	
Year	Winner	Club	Winner	Club	Winner	Club	Winner	Club
1970	Mike Procter	Gloucestershire	Not awarded					
1970	Jack Bond (Note: Also awarded Wisden Cricketer of the Year)	Lancashire	Not awarded					
1971	Lance Gibbs	Warwickshire	Not awarded					
1972	Barry Stead	Nottinghamshire	Not awarded					
1973	Peter Lee	Lancashire	Not awarded					
1974	Andy Roberts	Hampshire	Not awarded					
1975	Zaheer Abbas	Gloucestershire	Not awarded					
1976	Peter Lee	Lancashire	Not awarded					
1977	Mike Procter	Gloucestershire	Not awarded					
1978	John Lever	Essex	Not awarded					
1979	John Lever	Essex	Not awarded					
1980	Robin Jackman	Surrey	Not awarded					
1981	Richard Hadlee	Nottinghamshire	Not awarded					
1982	Malcolm Marshall	Hampshire	Not awarded					
1983	Ken McEwan	Essex	Not awarded					
1984	Richard Hadlee	Nottinghamshire	Not awarded					
1985	Neal Radford	Worcestershire	Not awarded					
1986	Courtney Walsh	Gloucestershire	Not awarded					
1987	Richard Hadlee	Nottinghamshire	Not awarded					
1988	Graeme Hick	Worcestershire	Not awarded					
1989	Jimmy Cook	Somerset	Not awarded					
1990	Graham Gooch	Essex	Michael Atherton (Note: Also awarded Cricket Writers' Club Young Cricketer of the Year)	Lancashire	Not awarded			
1991	Waqar Younis	Surrey	Dominic Cork	Derbyshire	Not awarded			
1992	Courtney Walsh	Gloucestershire	Mark Lathwell	Somerset	Not awarded			
1993	Steve Watkin	Glamorgan	Mal Loye	Northamptonshire	Not awarded			
1994	Brian Lara	Warwickshire	John Crawley	Lancashire	Not awarded			
1995	Dominic Cork	Derbyshire	Andrew Symonds	Gloucestershire	Not awarded			
1996	Phil Simmons	Leicestershire	Chris Silverwood	Yorkshire	Not awarded			
1997	Steve James	Glamorgan	Ben Hollioake	Surrey	Not awarded			
1998	Mal Loye	Northamptonshire	Andrew Flintoff	Lancashire	Not awarded			
1999	Stuart Law	Essex	David Sales	Northamptonshire	Not awarded			
2000	Marcus Trescothick	Somerset	Matthew Hoggard	Yorkshire	Not awarded			
2001	David Fulton	Kent	Nicky Peng	Durham	Not awarded			
2002	Michael Vaughan	Yorkshire	Kabir Ali	Worcestershire	Not awarded			
2003	Mushtaq Ahmed	Sussex	Kabir Ali	Worcestershire	Not awarded			
2004	Andrew Flintoff	Lancashire	Ian Bell	Warwickshire	Not awarded			
2005	Andrew Flintoff (Note: Also awarded BBC Sports Personality of the Year Award)	Lancashire	Alastair Cook	Essex	Not awarded			
2006	Mark Ramprakash	Surrey	Alastair Cook	Essex	Not awarded			
2007	Ottis Gibson	Durham	Adil Rashid	Yorkshire	Not awarded			
2008	Martin van Jaarsveld	Kent	Ravi Bopara	Essex	Not awarded			
2009	Marcus Trescothick	Somerset	James Taylor	Leicestershire	Not awarded			
2010	Neil Carter	Warwickshire	Adam Lyth	Yorkshire	Not awarded			
2011	Marcus Trescothick	Somerset	Alex Hales	Nottinghamshire	Not awarded			
2012	Nick Compton (Note: Also awarded Cricket Writers' Club County Championship Player of the Year)	Somerset	Joe Root	Yorkshire	Not awarded			
2013	Moeen Ali	Worcestershire	Ben Stokes	Durham	Not awarded			
2014	Adam Lyth	Yorkshire	Alex Lees	Yorkshire	Charlotte Edwards	Kent	Not awarded	
2015	Chris Rushworth	Durham	Tom Curran	Surrey	Anya Shrubsole	Somerset	Not awarded	
2016	Ben Duckett	Northamptonshire	Ben Duckett	Northamptonshire	Tammy Beaumont	Kent	Not awarded	
2017	Samit Patel	Nottinghamshire	Jamie Porter	Essex	Nat Sciver	Surrey	Not awarded	
2018	Joe Denly	Kent	Ollie Pope	Surrey	Sophie Ecclestone (Note: Also awarded ICC Women's Emerging Cricketer of the Year)	Lancashire	Not awarded	
2019	Ben Stokes	Durham	Tom Banton	Somerset	Sophie Ecclestone	Lancashire	Not awarded	
2020	Chris Woakes	Warwickshire	Zak Crawley	Kent	Sarah Glenn	Central Sparks	Not awarded	
2021	Joe Root	Yorkshire	Harry Brook	Yorkshire	Evelyn Jones	Central Sparks	Alice Capsey	South East Stars
2022	Jonny Bairstow	Yorkshire	Harry Brook	Yorkshire	Nat Sciver	Northern Diamonds	Freya Kemp	Southern Vipers
2023	Harry Brook	Yorkshire	James Rew	Somerset	Tammy Beaumont	The Blaze	Mahika Gaur	North West Thunder
2024	Liam Dawson	Hampshire	Jamie Smith	Surrey	Kathryn Bryce	The Blaze	Ryana MacDonald-Gay	South East Stars
2025	Jordan Cox	Essex	Rehan Ahmed	Leicestershire	Emma Lamb	Lancashire	Davina Perrin	Warwickshire
2026	Craig Overton	Somerset	Sonny Baker	Hampshire	Sophie Luff	Somerset	Tilly Corteen-Coleman	Surrey

== See also ==
- Wisden Cricketers of the Year
- Cricket Writers' Club County Championship Player of the Year
- Cricket Writers' Club Young Cricketer of the Year
