= Cricket Writers' Club Young Cricketer of the Year =

Cricket award

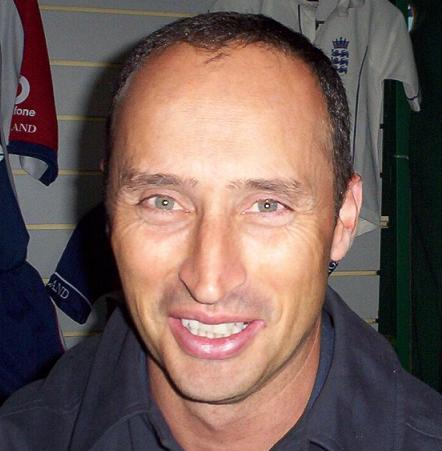
Nasser Hussain is one of fifteen England captains to have won the award.

The Cricket Writers' Club Young Cricketer of the Year is an annual cricket award, presented to the young player who is adjudged to have been the best of the year in English county cricket. The award has been presented since the 1950 season and the winner is chosen by a vote amongst the members of the Cricket Writers' Club. Only players that are qualified to represent the England cricket team, and are aged under 23 on 1 May of the awarding year, are eligible for the prize. With the exception of 1986, when a joint award was made, the accolade has been presented to one individual each season. The award has been described by the England and Wales Cricket Board (ECB) as "prestigious". Although not a firm rule, once a player has won the award, they are considered ineligible to receive it in the future.

Archie Ledbrooke, a sports reporter for the Daily Mirror and the first treasurer of the Cricket Writers' Club, came up with the idea for the award. It was first presented in 1950, when Roy Tattersall of Lancashire was the recipient. In 1986, the vote was tied, and the award was made jointly to Ashley Metcalfe of Nottinghamshire and James Whitaker of Leicestershire. The 1995 winner, Andrew Symonds, went on to make over 200 international appearances for Australia, but at the time of his award was eligible to play for England, as he was born in Birmingham. As of 2021, representatives of seventeen of the eighteen first-class cricket counties have won the award; no player from Worcestershire has ever won. Yorkshire players have collected the award most frequently, doing so on eleven occasions. Only seven winners have not gone on to play international cricket. (Note: One of these seven, Jack Leaning, is still active, and could still play international cricket.)

On eleven occasions, the Cricket Writers' Club Young Cricketer of the Year has also been named one of the five Wisden Cricketers of the Year for that season. Since 1990, 19 of the 35 winners have also collected the PCA Young Player of the Year award, selected by members of the players' trade union, the Professional Cricketers' Association.

== Key ==
- * Player still active
- Number in parentheses indicates number of international appearances as captain.
- Statistics correct as of 30 September 2026.
- Tests – indicates how many appearances the player made in Test cricket during their career.
- ODIs – indicates how many appearances the player made in One Day International cricket during their career.
- T20Is – indicates how many appearances the player made in Twenty20 International cricket during their career.

== Winners ==
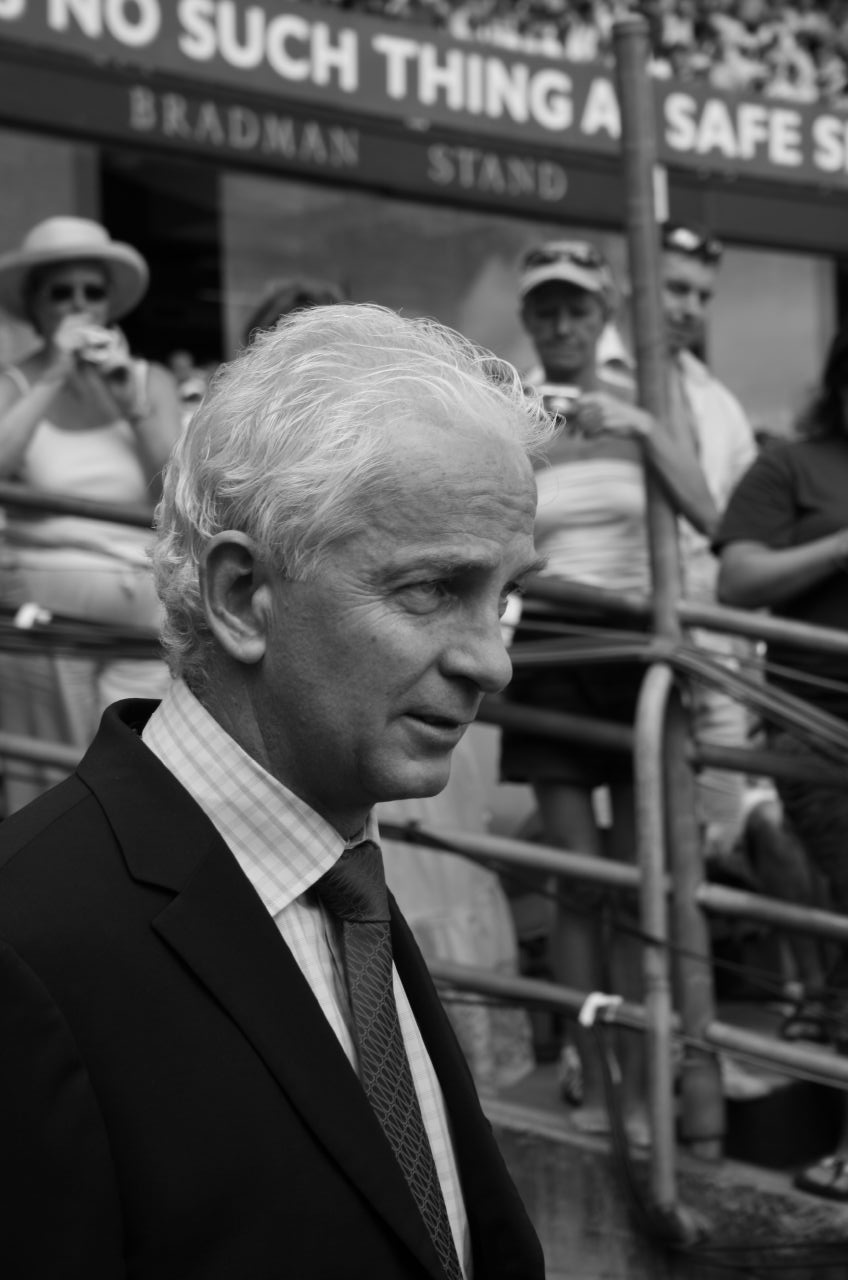
David Gower, who won the award in 1978, played over 200 matches for England.

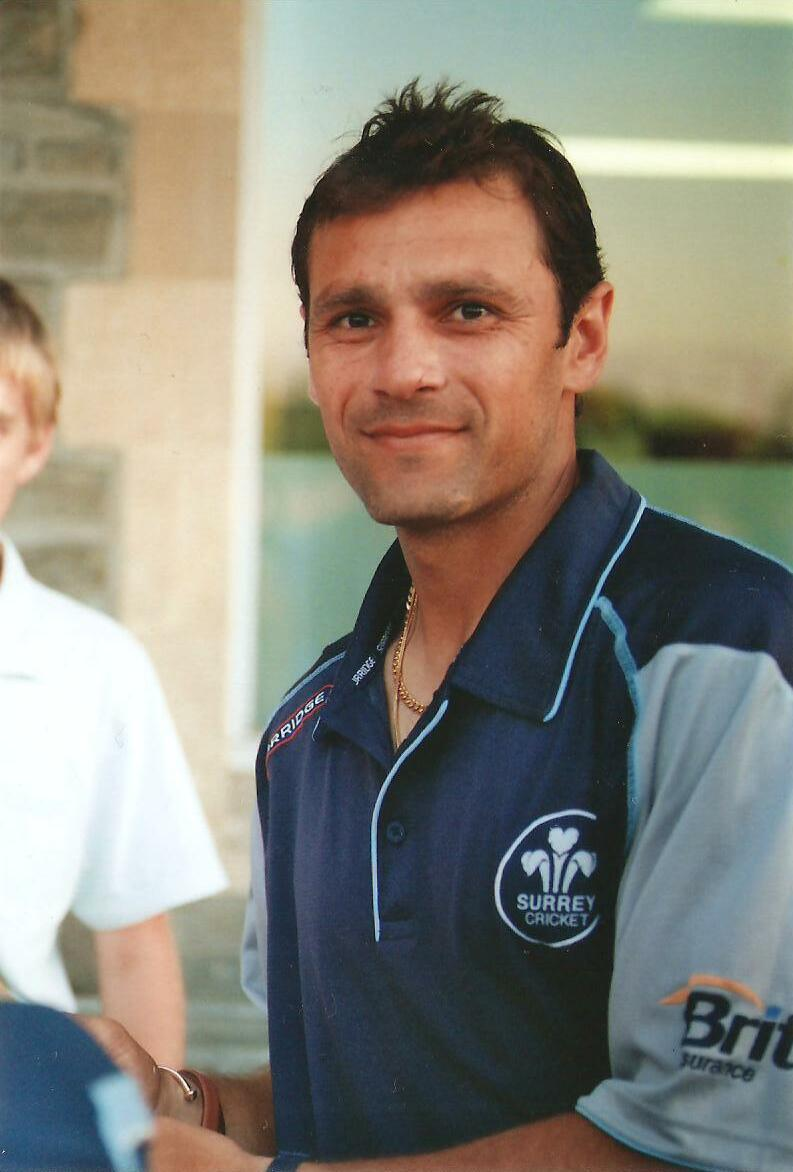
Mark Ramprakash won the award in 1991.

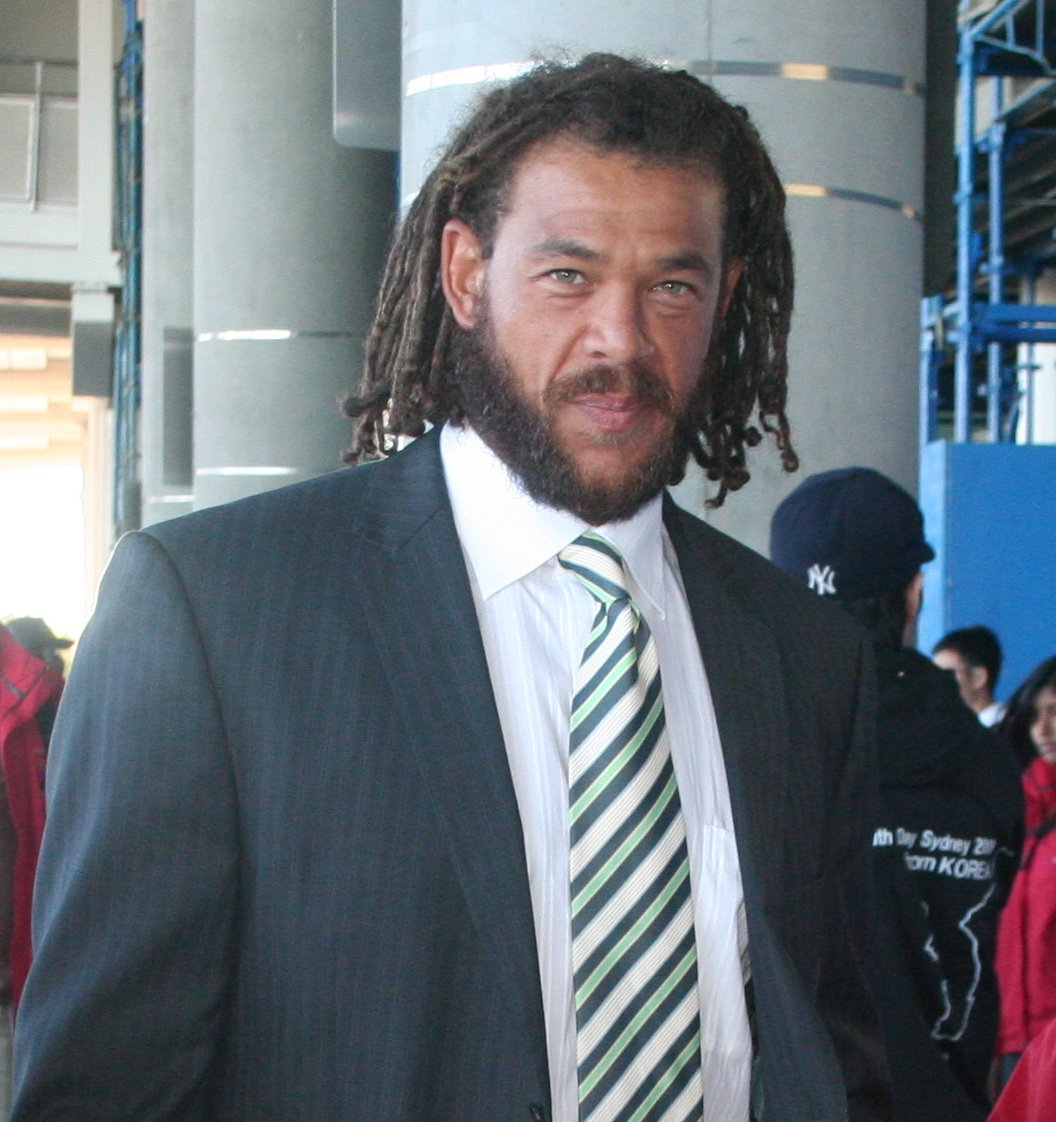
Despite being eligible to play for England when he won the award in 1995, Andrew Symonds made all his international appearances for Australia.

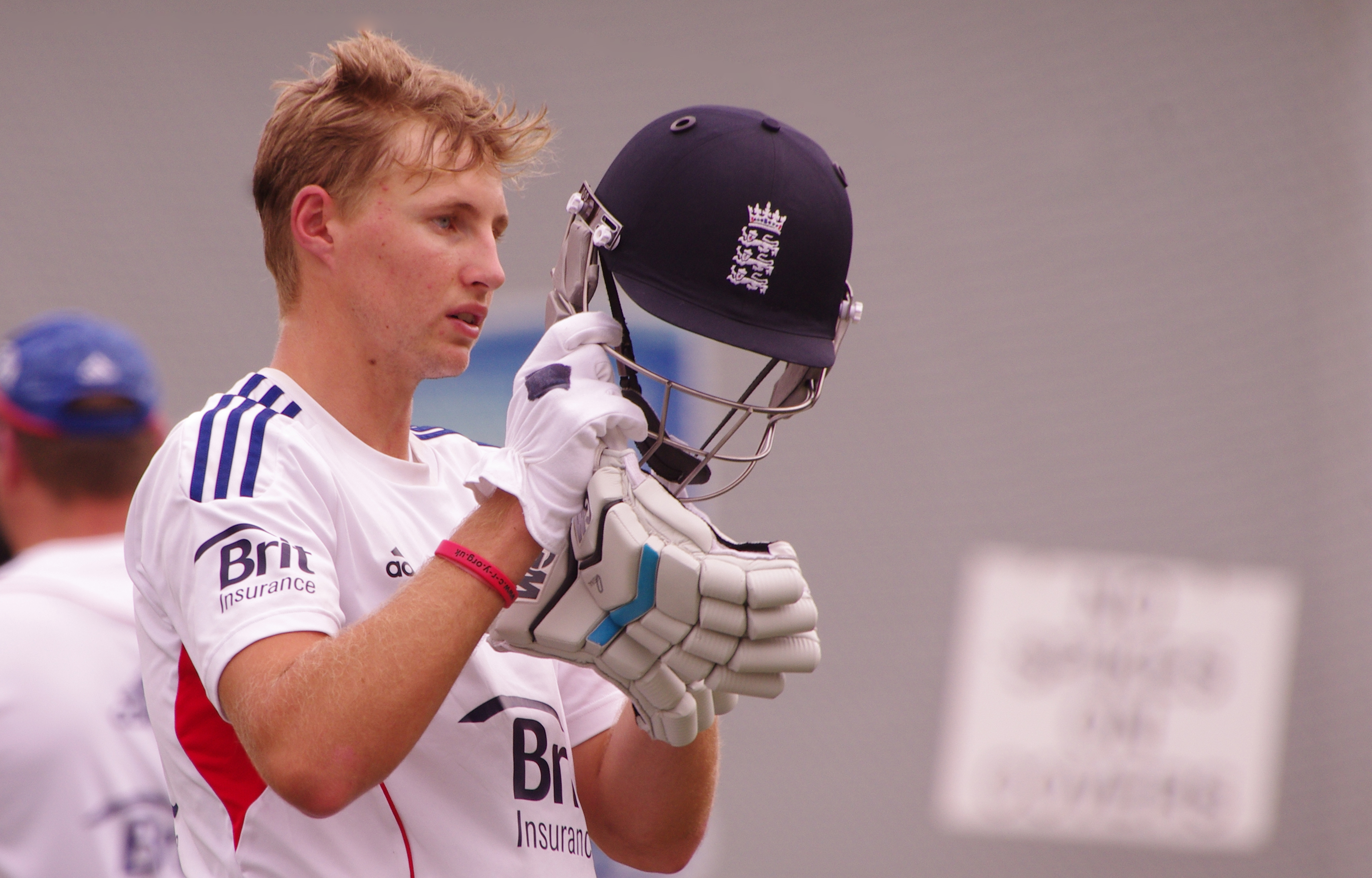
Joe Root was one of four Yorkshire players to win the award between 2011 and 2015.

Year	Player	Club	International appearances			Other awards for that season (Note: Wisden Cricketers of the Year are awarded for the previous English season. For the purposes of this list, being named Cricket Writers' Club Young Cricketer of the Year in 1950 is equivalent to being named a Wisden Cricketer of the Year in 1951.)	Ref(s)
Year	Player	Club	Tests	ODIs	T20Is	Other awards for that season	Ref(s)
1950	Roy Tattersall	Lancashire	16	0	0		
1951	Peter May	Surrey	66 (41)	0	0	Wisden Cricketer of the Year	
1952	Fred Trueman	Yorkshire	67	0	0	Wisden Cricketer of the Year	
1953	Colin Cowdrey	Kent	114 (27)	1	0		
1954	Peter Loader	Surrey	13	0	0		
1955	Ken Barrington	Surrey	82	0	0		
1956	Brian Taylor	Essex	0	0	0		
1957	Micky Stewart	Surrey	8	0	0	Wisden Cricketer of the Year	
1958	Colin Ingleby-Mackenzie	Hampshire	0	0	0		
1959	Geoff Pullar	Lancashire	28	0	0	Wisden Cricketer of the Year	
1960	David Allen	Gloucestershire	39	0	0		
1961	Peter Parfitt	Middlesex	37	0	0		
1962	Phil Sharpe	Yorkshire	12	0	0	Wisden Cricketer of the Year	
1963	Geoffrey Boycott	Yorkshire	108 (4)	36 (2)	0		
1964	Mike Brearley	Middlesex	39 (31)	25 (25)	0		
1965	Alan Knott	Kent	95	20 (1)	0		
1966	Derek Underwood	Kent	86	26	0		
1967	Tony Greig	Sussex	58 (14)	22 (2)	0		
1968	Bob Cottam	Hampshire	4	0	0		
1969	Alan Ward	Derbyshire	5	0	0		
1970	Chris Old	Yorkshire	46	32	0		
1971	John Whitehouse	Warwickshire	0	0	0		
1972	Dudley Owen-Thomas	Surrey	0	0	0		
1973	Mike Hendrick	Derbyshire	30	22	0		
1974	Phil Edmonds	Middlesex	51	29	0		
1975	Andrew Kennedy	Lancashire	0	0	0		
1976	Geoff Miller	Derbyshire	34	25	0		
1977	Ian Botham	Somerset	102 (12)	116 (9)	0	Wisden Cricketer of the Year	
1978	David Gower	Leicestershire	117 (32)	114 (24)	0	Wisden Cricketer of the Year	
1979	Paul Parker	Sussex	1	0	0		
1980	Graham Dilley	Kent	41	38	0		
1981	Mike Gatting	Middlesex	79 (23)	92 (37)	0		
1982	Norman Cowans	Middlesex	19	23	0		
1983	Neil Foster	Essex	29	48	0		
1984	Rob Bailey	Northamptonshire	4	4	0		
1985	David Lawrence	Gloucestershire	5	1	0		
1986	Ashley Metcalfe	Yorkshire	0	0	0		
1986	James Whitaker	Leicestershire	1	2	0	Wisden Cricketer of the Year	
1987	Richard Blakey	Yorkshire	2	3	0		
1988	Matthew Maynard	Glamorgan	4	14	0		
1989	Nasser Hussain	Essex	96 (45)	88 (56)	0		
1990	Mike Atherton	Lancashire	115 (54)	54 (43)	0	Wisden Cricketer of the Year; PCA Young Player of the Year	
1991	Mark Ramprakash	Middlesex	52	18	0		
1992	Ian Salisbury	Sussex	15	4	0	Wisden Cricketer of the Year	
1993	Mark Lathwell	Somerset	2	0	0		
1994	John Crawley	Lancashire	37	13	0	PCA Young Player of the Year	
1995	Andrew Symonds	Gloucestershire	26	198	14	PCA Young Player of the Year	(Note: All of Andrew Symonds' international appearances were made for Australia.)
1996	Chris Silverwood	Yorkshire	6	7	0	PCA Young Player of the Year	
1997	Ben Hollioake	Surrey	2	20	0	PCA Young Player of the Year	
1998	Andrew Flintoff	Lancashire	79 (11)	141 (14)	7	PCA Young Player of the Year	
1999	Alex Tudor	Surrey	10	3	0		
2000	Paul Franks	Nottinghamshire	0	1	0		
2001	Owais Shah	Middlesex	6	71	17		
2002	Rikki Clarke	Surrey	2	20	0		
2003	James Anderson*	Lancashire	188	194	19		
2004	Ian Bell	Warwickshire	118	161	8	PCA Young Player of the Year	
2005	Alastair Cook	Essex	161 (59)	92 (69)	4 (1)	PCA Young Player of the Year	
2006	Stuart Broad	Leicestershire	167	121 (3)	56 (27)		
2007	Adil Rashid*	Yorkshire	19	164	153	PCA Young Player of the Year	
2008	Ravi Bopara*	Essex	13	120	38	PCA Young Player of the Year	
2009	James Taylor	Leicestershire	7	27	0	PCA Young Player of the Year	
2010	Steven Finn	Middlesex	36	69	21		
2011	Jonny Bairstow*	Yorkshire	100	107	80		
2012	Joe Root*	Yorkshire	169 (68)	195	32	PCA Young Player of the Year	
2013	Ben Stokes*	Durham	122 (44)	114 (3)	43	PCA Young Player of the Year	
2014	Alex Lees*	Yorkshire	10	0	0	PCA Young Player of the Year	
2015	Jack Leaning*	Yorkshire	0	0	0		
2016	Ben Duckett*	Northamptonshire	49	40	21	PCA Player of the Year; PCA Young Player of the Year	
2017	Daniel Lawrence*	Essex	17	0	0		
2018	Sam Curran*	Surrey	24	44	80		
2019	Tom Banton*	Somerset	0	10	43	PCA Young Player of the Year	
2020	Zak Crawley*	Kent	64	9 (2)	0	Wisden Cricketer of the Year; PCA Young Player of the Year	
2021	Harry Brook*	Yorkshire	41	44 (23)	71 (27)	PCA Young Player of the Year	
2022	Jordan Cox*	Kent	4	4	9		
2023	James Rew*	Somerset	1	0	0	PCA Young Player of the Year	
2024	Shoaib Bashir*	Somerset	21	0	0		
2025	Rehan Ahmed*	Leicestershire	5	11	14	PCA Young Player of the Year	

== See also ==
- Bradman Young Cricketer of the Year for best young Australian cricketer
