= English cricket team in Zimbabwe in 2004–05 =

England in Zimbabwe in 2004–05
	England	Zimbabwe
- Dates: 28 November – 5 December 2004
Captains	Michael Vaughan	Tatenda Taibu

One Day International series
- Results: England won the 4-match series 4–0
Most runs	Michael Vaughan (211)	Dion Ebrahim (122)
Most wickets	Darren Gough (7); Alex Wharf (7)	Stuart Matsikenyeri (7)
- Player of the series: Michael Vaughan (Eng)

The England cricket team toured Zimbabwe from 28 November to 5 December 2004 for a four-match One Day International (ODI) series, with two matches in Harare and two in Bulawayo. England won all four matches. Foreign journalists were originally banned from covering the series, but the Zimbabwean government lifted the ban for some journalists on 25 November; however, this delay in getting accreditation for the journalists resulted in the cancellation of the first of the five planned ODIs that was due to have taken place on 26 November.

== Squads ==
England named a 14-man squad for the tour of Zimbabwe, minus fast bowler Steve Harmison, who ruled himself out of the tour for "political and sporting reasons". Also missing from the side were opening batsman Marcus Trescothick and all-rounder Andrew Flintoff, who were rested ahead of England's tour of South Africa later in the year; Ashley Giles was also given the option to miss the tour, but he chose to travel with the team. New to the England ODI set-up were batsmen Ian Bell and Kevin Pietersen, wicket-keeper Matt Prior, and bowler Simon Jones.

Zimbabwe	England
Tatenda Taibu (c and wk); Elton Chigumbura; Dion Ebrahim; Gavin Ewing; Douglas Hondo; Hamilton Masakadza; Stuart Matsikenyeri; Chris Mpofu; Mluleki Nkala; Tinashe Panyangara; Ed Rainsford; Donald Samunderu; Vusi Sibanda; Brendan Taylor; Prosper Utseya; Mark Vermeulen	Michael Vaughan (c); James Anderson; Gareth Batty; Ian Bell; Paul Collingwood; Ashley Giles; Darren Gough; Geraint Jones (wk); Simon Jones; Kevin Pietersen; Matt Prior (wk); Vikram Solanki; Andrew Strauss; Alex Wharf

== ODI series ==
=== 1st ODI ===
28 November 2004
Scorecard

Zimbabwe; 195 (49.3 overs)	v	England; 197/5 (47.4 overs)
Elton Chigumbura 52 (47); Darren Gough 3/34 (9.3 overs)		Ian Bell 75 (115); Stuart Matsikenyeri 2/33 (10 overs)

England won by 5 wickets
Harare Sports Club, Harare
Umpires: Kevan Barbour (Zim) and Brian Jerling (SA)
Player of the match: Ian Bell (Eng)

- England won the toss and elected to field.
- Ian Bell, Kevin Pietersen (both Eng) and Chris Mpofu (Zim) made their ODI debuts.

=== 2nd ODI ===
1 December 2004
Scorecard

England; 263/6 (50 overs)	v	Zimbabwe; 102 (36 overs)
Kevin Pietersen 77* (76); Tinashe Panyangara 3/61 (10 overs)		Tatenda Taibu 32 (48); Alex Wharf 4/24 (6 overs)

England won by 161 runs
Harare Sports Club, Harare
Umpires: Darrell Hair (Aus) and Russell Tiffin (Zim)
Player of the match: Kevin Pietersen (Eng)

- England won the toss and elected to bat.
- Gavin Ewing (Zim) made his ODI debut.

=== 3rd ODI ===
4 December 2004
Scorecard

Zimbabwe; 238/7 (50 overs)	v	England; 239/2 (43.1 overs)
Stuart Matsikenyeri 73 (95); Simon Jones 2/43 (8 overs)		Vikram Solanki 100 (93); Stuart Matsikenyeri 2/43 (10 overs)

England won by 8 wickets
Queens Sports Club, Bulawayo
Umpires: Kevan Barbour (Zim) and Brian Jerling (SA)
Player of the match: Vikram Solanki (Eng)

- Zimbabwe won the toss and elected to bat.
- Simon Jones (Eng) made his ODI debut.

=== 4th ODI ===
5 December 2004
Scorecard

England; 261/6 (50 overs)	v	Zimbabwe; 187 (48.4 overs)
Michael Vaughan 90* (99); Ed Rainsford 2/29 (10 overs)		Hamilton Masakadza 66 (83); Darren Gough 4/34 (8 overs)

England won by 74 runs
Queens Sports Club, Bulawayo
Umpires: Darrell Hair (Aus) and Russell Tiffin (Zim)
Player of the match: Geraint Jones (Eng)

- England won the toss and elected to bat.
- Matt Prior (Eng) made his ODI debut.
