= Alex Lees =

English cricketer (born 1993)

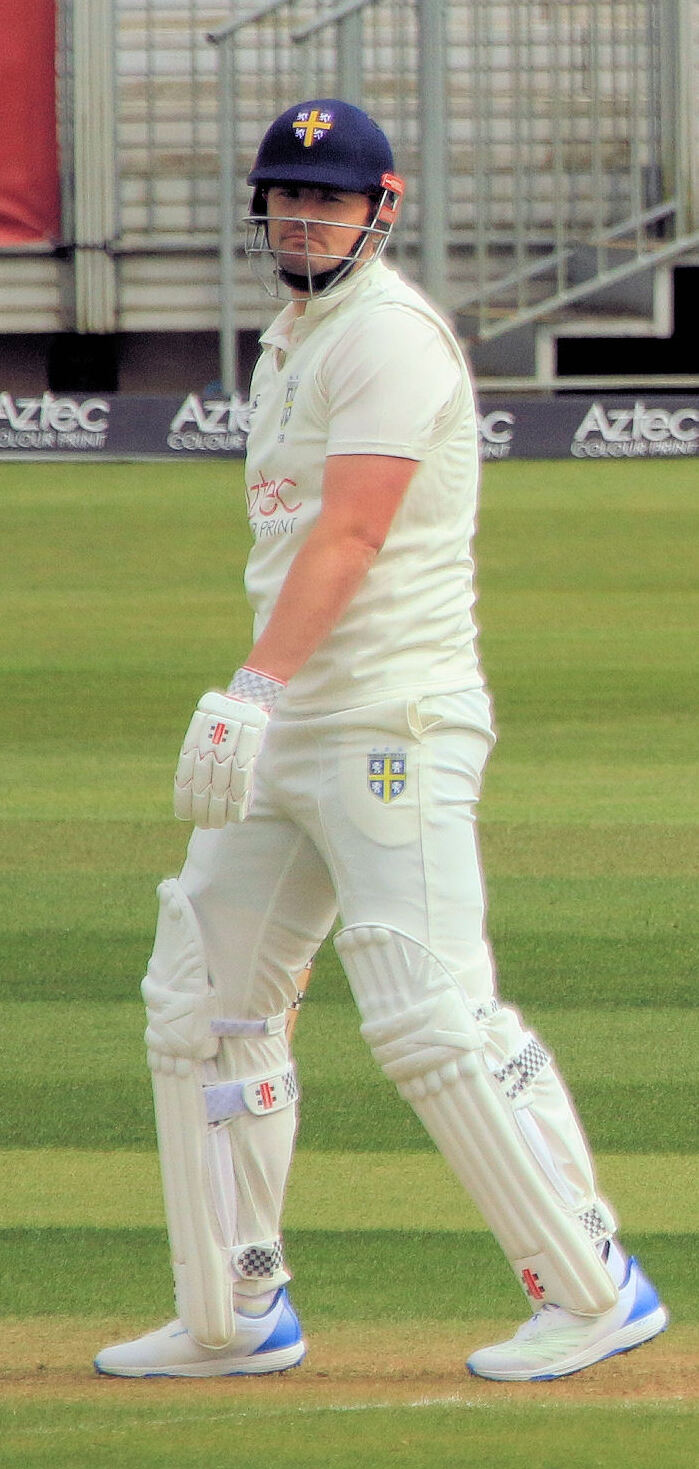
- Lees in 2025

Personal information
- Full name: Alexander Zak Lees
- Born: 14 April 1993 (age 33); Halifax, West Yorkshire, England
- Height: 1.87 m (6 ft 2 in)
- Batting: Left-handed
- Bowling: Right-arm leg break
- Role: Opening batter

International information
- National side: England (2022)
- Test debut (cap 701): 8 March 2022 v West Indies
- Last Test: 8 September 2022 v South Africa

Domestic team information
- Years: Team
- 2010–2018: Yorkshire (squad no. 14)
- 2018: → Durham (on loan)
- 2019–present: Durham (squad no. 19)

Career statistics
Competition	Test	FC	LA	T20
Matches	10	206	94	117
Runs scored	453	12,561	3,476	3,058
Batting average	23.84	38.06	42.39	30.27
100s/50s	0/2	33/56	10/22	2/18
Top score	67	275*	148	108
Balls bowled	–	67	–	–
Wickets	–	3	–	–
Bowling average	–	32.00	–	–
5 wickets in innings	–	0	–	–
10 wickets in match	–	0	–	–
Best bowling	–	2/51	–	–
Catches/stumpings	6/–	129/–	40/–	40/–
- Source: ESPNcricinfo, 27 September 2026

Alexander Zak Lees (born 14 April 1993), popularly known as Alex Lees, is an English professional cricketer who plays internationally for the England Test cricket team. In domestic cricket, he represents Durham, captaining the List A and T20 teams, since March 2023. He became Durham's First Class captain before the start of the 2025 season, replacing Scott Borthwick.

He previously played for Yorkshire. Lees made his Test debut in 2022, and plays as a left-handed opening batsman.

== Early life ==
Alex Lees was born in Halifax, West Yorkshire, where he attended Holy Trinity Senior School. His introduction to cricket was with Bradshaw Cricket Club in the Halifax Cricket League, quickly moving from the junior ranks into senior cricket before he was a teenager. Lees left Bradshaw and move to Illingworth at the age of 13. He was attached to Yorkshire from 2006, starting at under 11 level. He played for and captained the Yorkshire Academy in the Yorkshire ECB County Premier League, and the Yorkshire Second XI in the Second XI Championship, before progressing to the first team. He made his debut in first-class cricket against India A in June 2010, scoring 38 runs. In April 2013, Lees made his maiden first-class century in his third first-class match, when scoring 121 against Leeds/Bradford MCC Universities at Headingley.

== Cricket career ==
He was part of the England player development XI in both 2010 and 2011. In September 2011, Yorkshire County Cricket Club announced that Lees had been awarded a junior-pro contract. He was given plaudits from the former England opener Geoffrey Boycott, who stated that "I think he's very good ... I like the whole package with him".

Lees played his first match against an England first-class county side in April 2013, when he appeared for Yorkshire against Sussex, and scored a century in his third County Championship match with 100 against Middlesex at Lord's. In July, he played only the 50th innings of over 250 runs for Yorkshire, scoring 275 not out in the first innings of the match against Derbyshire at Queen's Park, Chesterfield. His innings was the third-highest score at the ground and also made him the youngest Yorkshire player to score a double hundred.

In August 2013, Lees was selected to play for England Lions in a two-day friendly match against the Australians at Northampton, opening the batting and scoring 33 runs. He then travelled to Australia with the England Performance Squad, though he did not pass fifty. He also played for the Lions against Sri Lanka A Emerging Players in February 2014, scoring a century in the first match.

During the 2014 and 2015 seasons Lees formed a strong opening partnership with Adam Lyth, helping Yorkshire win the County Championship in both years.

In 2016 he became Yorkshire's captain in both one-day formats - at 22, the youngest to hold the office, remarkably, since Lord Hawke.

In September 2014, Lees was named the Cricket Writers' Club Young Cricketer of the Year. On 13 August 2018, Lees signed for Durham on loan until the end of the 2018 season before signing a three-year contract at the end of the season.

In February 2022, Lees was named in England's Test squad for their series against the West Indies. He made his Test debut on 8 March 2022, for England against the West Indies.

In April 2022, in the opening round of matches in the 2022 County Championship, Lees carried his bat against Glamorgan, scoring an unbeaten 182 runs.

In July 2023 he made his best score for Durham County Cricket Club to date with scoring 195 against Gloucestershire.

Lees was named Durham club captain in December 2024 after signing a new three-year contract.
