= Cricket Media Club =

The Cricket Media Club, established in 1947 as the Cricket Writers' Club, is an association for cricket journalists working in print, television, radio, online, and other media channels. As of 2006, around 90% of eligible journalists were members.

During the 1946–47 Ashes series, the Australian and British cricket media spent around eight months travelling around together covering the matches. Early in the tour, during their stay in Perth, they established an informal "Empire Cricket Writers' Club". This placed the idea in the minds of a number of journalists for a formal association, and so in June 1947, the Cricket Writers' Club was started. E. W. Swanton was its first chairman (1947–1949).

Although it was established significantly later than other such organisations around the world, it triggered the creation of the Football Writers' Association and the Sports Writers' Association in the United Kingdom within six months. In 1950, the Cricket Writers' Club began awarding a Young Cricketer of the Year award, and have since introduced a number of other awards which are presented at their annual dinner.

In 2025, the members voted to rename the club as the Cricket Media Club.
