= Professional Cricketers' Association =

Representative body of professional Welsh and English Cricketers

- Abbreviation: PCA
- Formation: 1967; 59 years ago
- Founder: Fred Rumsey
- Headquarters: Edgbaston Cricket Ground, London, England
- Region served: United Kingdom
- Members: ▲538 (2024)
- Chair: Oliver Hannon-Dalby
- Website: thepca.co.uk

The Professional Cricketers' Association (PCA) is the representative body of past and present first-class cricketers in England and Wales, founded in 1967 by former England fast bowler Fred Rumsey (when it was known as the Cricketers' Association). In the 1970s, the PCA arranged a standard employment contract and minimum wage for professional cricketers in first-class cricket in England and Wales. In 1995 it helped create a pension scheme for cricketers, and in 2002 launched the magazine All Out Cricket, as well as the ACE UK Educational Programme

== History ==
Former Somerset and England fast bowler Fred Rumsey founded the Professional Cricketers’ Association in 1967. Before the creation of the PCA English cricket players had little to no say in the administration of the game in England and Wales. Rumsey's creation of a players union was recognised when the PCA appointed him honorary life founder member and a vice-president.

John Arlott became the first president in 1968. Wisden noted that his

"democratic views and wise counsel earned him much respect in the cricket world and among the players. His moderation and tact helped in some tight corners, notably at the time of the Packer Affair, when he strove to keep the Cricketers' Association neutral."

Mike Edwards was appointed the first treasurer in 1968, and was elected chairman in 1970. He subsequently resigned the post following a majority decision by the membership to accept a donation from the Transvaal in apartheid-era South Africa.

Harold Goldblatt was a chartered accountant who was asked by Arlott to assist the PCA. It was he who negotiated the minimum wage, the standard contract and insurance cover for all players. He utilized the over-rate fines from 1985 to form the Cricket Association Charity, for the benefit of former County players who had fallen on hard financial times, and the charity has helped over 80 such players to date. He was appointed senior vice president for life in appreciation of the 30 years of service he gave to the association. In an article about the PCA originally published in the March 1979 issue of The Cricketer, Arlott wrote that Goldblatt was "invaluable as financial adviser".

In 1997, the PCA was instrumental in settling the dispute between the Test and County Cricket Board and Kerry Packer over his World Series Cricket. In 1999, it played a key rôle in the formation of the Federation of International Cricketers' Associations (FICA).

An anti-doping education programme was launched in 2006, followed in 2008 by an addictive behaviour programme, covering subjects such as problem gambling, and in 2009 an awareness campaign about skin cancer.

England women players have been admitted to membership of the PCA since 2011.

== Administration ==
The committee is headed by a Chair, currently (since February 2025) Olly Hannon-Dalby. There are two vice-chairs, currently Georgia Elwiss and Anuj Dal, and representatives from each first-class county and from England women's cricket.

The PCA holds an annual awards dinner, with the Reg Hayter Cup for the PCA Player of the Year award being one of the more prestigious awards in the domestic game.

== See also ==
- Australian Cricketers' Association
- Federation of International Cricketers' Associations
