= Leicestershire County Cricket Club in 2005 =

Leicestershire Foxes
2005 season
- Captain: HD Ackerman
- Ground(s): Grace Road, Leicester; Oakham School

Leicestershire County Cricket Club in 2005 are playing their cricket in Division Two of the County Championship and of the totesport League. They started the season as 25–1 outsiders to take the Division Two Championship title. These odds looked reasonable as they plummeted to an innings defeat in their first match, picking up only one point against Durham. They then lost their first totesport match, also against Durham, by 9 runs on the Duckworth-Lewis method.

Their second Championship match saw them have the worse of a draw against Northamptonshire, and they may have been saved by a late declaration from Northants. Leicestershire then lost their Sunday League game at Canterbury in a rain-affected match, before drawing with Durham UCCE. Playing at the Foxes, they then beat the Sabres at Taunton. Then, on 4 May, they edged past the same side at Grace Road in a low-scoring game to progress to Round Two of the C&G Trophy.

They then beat Surrey in the National League. On 17 May they were dumped out of the C&G Trophy at the Second Round stage by Warwickshire.

June started with a draw against Somerset, before winning the Sunday match against the same team. On 11 June they took on the Australians over 50 overs and lost heavily. However, they recovered well to take a low-scoring match against Yorkshire the following day, and then bowled Worcestershire out 13 runs short of a target of 141 to take a County Championship match against them. Two wins in the National League followed, sending them up into third place, as Leicestershire were on a high going into the Twenty20 matches.

And they took care of their good form. Winning two of their first three games, against Nottinghamshire, Derbyshire and Durham, they looked well on the way to the quarter-finals, although the fight would be difficult against Lancashire, to whom they lost their fourth match. However, that was their last loss, as Leicestershire won three of their next four to finish second in the North Division. In the County Championship, however, they were defeated by a triple century from Somerset's skipper Graeme Smith, which sent them further down the Division Two tables. Their second tour match of the season against Australia followed - this time they drew, thanks to a solid batting effort from Australian Chris Rogers, who made a career highest-score of 209.

As defending champions of the Twenty20 Cup, they booked their places in the semi-finals yet again on 18 July thanks to a victory over Middlesex, but lost to Yorkshire, conceding 400 runs in the second innings to the Yorkshiremen for the second time this season. In the National League, however, they defeated Scotland easily, before drawing a rain-hit match with Essex. On 30 July they travelled to The Oval to lose their Twenty20 Cup semi-final with Somerset Sabres.

August started with a 234-run Championship loss to Lancashire, before they travelled down to the coast to beat Sussex in the National League. However, a loss against Surrey meant that they would have to struggle to keep their promotion place in Division Two, as Durham were now tied on points with a game in hand. They played Durham in the Championship in the second week of August, and a rain-hit, high-scoring match ended in a draw. In the National League, however, they were bowled out for 113 and lost by eight wickets, losing ground in the promotion battle. Their second National League victory over Sussex in two weeks, however, meant that promotion in the National League was quite possible, and a rained off match with Warwickshire kept that battle tight.

A rain-hit Championship match at Grace Road with Northamptonshire ended in a draw, and so did their last match of August, with Worcestershire. They managed their fifth match without defeat when they trounced Yorkshire by 133 runs at Headingley, but that run was broken by Derbyshire at home two days later. Derbyshire and the rain also held them to a Championship draw.

Leicestershire hosted the International 20:20 Club Championship in the middle of September, and after progressing to the semi-finals thanks to a win over Somerset Sabres, they were defeated by nine runs by Chilaw Marians, before rounding off the season with a rare Championship win over Lancashire and a League win over Kent.

== Players ==
- Dinesh Mongia
- Charl Willoughby
- Matthew Boyce
- David Brignull
- Stuart Broad
- Charles Dagnall
- Phil DeFreitas
- Nicholas Ferraby
- Ottis Gibson
- Aftab Habib
- Claude Henderson
- Chris Liddle
- Darren Maddy
- David Masters
- John Maunders
- Tom New
- Paul Nixon
- Darren Robinson
- John Sadler
- Jeremy Snape

== Tables ==
=== Championship ===
2005 County Championship – Division Two
Pos	Team	Pld	W	D	L	Pen	Bat	Bowl	Pts
1	Lancashire	16	7	6	3	0	43	47	212
2	Durham	16	6	8	2	0	45	44	205
3	Yorkshire	16	5	10	1	0.5	49	42	200.5
4	Northamptonshire	16	5	8	3	0	45	46	193
5	Essex	16	5	7	4	0	51	36	185
6	Worcestershire	16	5	4	7	5.5	53	46	179.5
7	Leicestershire	16	3	7	6	0.5	45	45	159.5
8	Somerset	16	4	5	7	0	42	37	155
9	Derbyshire	16	1	7	8	0	31	43	116

=== totesport League ===
2005 totesport League – Division Two
Pos	Team	Pld	W	L	NR	T	Pts
1	Sussex Sharks	18	13	4	1	0	54
2	Durham Dynamos	18	12	4	2	0	52
3	Warwickshire Bears	18	10	6	2	0	44
4	Leicestershire Foxes	18	10	7	1	0	42
5	Derbyshire Phantoms	18	9	7	1	1	40
6	Somerset Sabres	18	9	8	1	0	38
7	Surrey Lions	18	7	10	1	0	30
8	Kent Spitfires	18	6	10	2	0	28
9	Yorkshire Phoenix	18	5	13	0	0	20
10	Scottish Saltires	18	2	14	1	1	12

== Match details ==
=== Leicestershire v Durham (13–15 April) ===
Durham (22pts) beat Leicestershire (1pt) by an innings and 216 runs

Durham won the toss against Leicestershire and elected to bat first at Grace Road, Leicester. The first day was dominated by Durham's Australian left-handed opener, Mike Hussey. Hussey may not be good enough to make the Australian Test squad, but he was good to make an undefeated 165 off 290 balls on a flat pitch on the first day. Former England Under-19 batsman Gordon Muchall helped Hussey add 166 for the third-wicket partnership, before being run out for 82. Durham finished day one on 325 for 3.

On the second day, Hussey powered on, and was seventh man out for 253, an innings that included 3 sixes and 33 fours. Durham finally declared on a mammoth 523 for 8 declared off 161 overs. It did not get much better for Leicestershire when they finally did get to bat on a pitch was much less placid than on the first day. Liam Plunkett soon took their first four wickets, and also had one dropped as Leicestershire struggled to 49 for 4. Leicestershire went on to finish their first innings on 123 all out. Plunkett finished on 5 for 43. Leicestershire were then forced to follow-on exactly 400 behind. They made 10 without loss by the end of the day. Stephen Harmison, England's out of form fast bowler, performed well, but could still not take a wicket and was upstaged by Plunkett.

Durham spent 70.3 third-day overs on the process of finishing off Leicestershire. The good news for England fans will be the return to form of Harmison, who took 4 for 30 as Leicestershire were dismissed for 184. At one stage, Harmison had taken three wickets in a 15-ball spell without conceding a run. Plunkett continued to unsettle the batsmen and finished on 3 for 55. Only one Leicestershire batsman, John Maunders, was able to score a 50.(Cricinfo scorecard)

=== Leicestershire v Durham (17 April) ===
Durham (4pts) beat Leicestershire (0pts) by 9 runs (D/L method)

Leicestershire Foxes won the toss at Grace Road, Leicester and elected to bat. Liam Plunkett continued his good form, dismissing John Maunders and Aftab Habib early, as the Foxes faltered to 4 for 2. Darren Maddy and HD Ackerman then put on 98 for the third wicket, which helped Leicestershire to 175 for 8 off their 45 overs. Durham Dynamos edged to 85 for 3 from 33 overs, when rain prevented further play, leaving Durham the winners on the Duckworth-Lewis method. (BBC scorecard)

=== Northamptonshire v Leicestershire (20–23 April) ===
Northamptonshire (12pts) drew with Leicestershire (9pts)

The first day at Northampton saw only 26.2 overs, during which Northamptonshire progressed to 90 for no loss. On the second day Bilal Shafayat (59), Martin Love (50), David Sales (113), Damien Wright (95) and Gerard Brophy (52) all contributed with the bat, as the hosts moved to 433 for 6 declared. However, Northamptonshire bowled without luck, allowing Leicestershire to score 69 for 0 at close.

On the third day, Leicestershire progressed to 339 all out, with Darren Robinson scoring 100. However, the innings was controversial, with three debatable decisions going against the visitors. First Robinson was given out caught, when the ball probably hit his forearm. Then HD Ackerman was out leg before to a delivery that looked high. Then, at 220 for 5 Aftab Habib edged Jason Brown low to Martin Love at first slip. Habib thought it had not carried, and Love and one umpire were not sure. The other umpire said he was out, so off Habib went. But he returned to confront Shafayat who taunted Habib on the dismissal. Northamptonshire progressed to 45 for 0 at close.

The fourth day saw the game peter out to a draw, as a late declaration, with the score on 238 for 3, left Northamptonshire just less than two session to dismiss Leicestershire, who were set an unrealistic target of 333 to win in 58 overs. Leicestershire were 115 for 4 when the draw was agreed with 11 overs still available. (BBC scorecard)

=== Kent v Leicestershire (24 April) ===
Kent (4pts) beat Leicestershire (0pts) by 6 runs (D/L method)

At Canterbury Leicestershire Foxes scored 214 from their 45 overs, with Dinesh Mongia contributing 62. Martin Saggers, who is not yet fully fit, took 3 for 46 for the Kent Spitfires. In reply, England openers Rob Key and Geraint Jones both failed, before South Africa's Martin van Jaarsveld continued his great start to the season with an unbeaten 69. Kent were 150 for 4 after 33.5 overs when rain and bad light brought an end to a closely fought game, which Kent took after being ahead according to the Duckworth-Lewis method. (Cricinfo scorecard)

=== Leicestershire v Durham UCCE (27–29 April) ===
Match drawn

Leicestershire batted first at Grace Road, and Darren Maddy made the most of his chance against the students. He has scored only one Championship ton in the last two seasons, but got to 124 on the first day. At close, Leicestershire were on 288 for 3. On the second day, they declared on 384 for 4. Durham UCCE went slowly. David Brown finished the day, having batted for over 4 hours and through 237 balls to get an undefeated 68. But after being reduced to 12 for 3, that's exactly what the students needed. They finished on 169 for 6 off 79 overs, 216 behind, but well on the way towards saving the game. On the third day, Durham UCCE went on to score 255 thanks to 73 from David Balcombe, avoiding the follow-on and saving the game. It was only batting practice from there with Leicestershire ending on 187 for 4. (BBC scorecard)

=== Somerset v Leicestershire (1 May) ===
Somerset (4pts) beat Leicestershire (0pts) by 8 wickets

The Leicestershire Foxes were restricted to 211 for 8 at Taunton, with Aaron Laraman the pick of the Somerset bowlers - his bowling analysis read 9-2-17-2. Four Leicestershire batsmen passed 30, yet the highest score of the innings was Paul Nixon's 41. John Francis and Keith Parsons then completed the win for the Sabres with 73 and 91 respectively, sharing a third-wicket partnership of 157. This gave Somerset their first win in any competition this season, and meant that the Foxes were still waiting for their first win. (BBC scorecard)

=== Leicestershire v Somerset (4 May) ===
Leicestershire beat Somerset by 3 wickets to progress to Round Two of the C&G Trophy

It was an unusual game at Grace Road, which was all done by 3.30pm. The ball swung greatly, and there was seam movement, and Charl Willoughby of Leicestershire made the most of them first, taking 6 for 16 as Somerset were dismissed for 94 - though it could have been much worse, as they were 58 for 9 before Ian Blackwell and Simon Francis attacked and added 36 for the last wicket. Marcus Trescothick, the Somerset captain, who only made 11 said, "Conditions were not conducive to one-day cricket, that's for sure. Unfortunately, we lost the toss and had the worst of it, but we still thought we could win because we have more consistent length bowlers. Even 130 or so could have been a great score."

Leicestershire themselves struggled in reply, and Somerset took wickets regularly, reducing the hosts to 70 for 7. However, they were not able to take another, as Leicestershire ended on 96 for 7 - Ottis Gibson and Claude Henderson adding 26 for the eighth wicket, Leicestershire's highest partnership of the match. (Cricinfo scorecard)

=== Essex v Leicestershire (6–9 May) ===
Essex (21pts) beat Leicestershire (3.5pts) by six wickets

In a relatively closely fought game at Chelmsford, the Essex team showed more resilience than the visitors, with nearly everyone chipping in to give the hosts a relatively comfortable victory. It started with a good bowling effort on the first day, after Ronnie Irani had chosen to put Leicestershire in. It nearly backfired, Darren Robinson and Darren Maddy easing their way to 98 for no loss, but the part-time medium pace of Essex number three Ravinder Bopara got Maddy out, resulting in a mini-collapse to 167 for 8. David Masters (27) and Phil DeFreitas (20) saved the innings somewhat, but Leicestershire's final total of 220 off 81 overs meant that Essex looked like being in the drivers' seat. Dale Steyn, the young South African pace bowler with three Test caps, took three for 69 on Essex debut, but Darren Gough was the pick of the bowlers with three for 46 - including Robinson, Paul Nixon for a golden duck and DeFreitas.

With every Essex batsman except number 11 Steyn (run out for 0) scoring in double figures, Essex showed a real team effort, with in-form opener William Jefferson top-scoring with 93 as Essex got into a relatively comfortable lead of 142. Leicestershire fought back well on the third day, though, having lost Maddy before stumps on the second day to be 57 for 1. Robinson, Dinesh Mongia, Aftab Habib and HD Ackerman all passed 30, and Claude Henderson chipped in with a fine 55 from number 9, as Leicestershire made their way to a lead of 190. Only Gough showed consistent threat, taking four wickets for 60, while Steyn again became too inconsistent - he conceded 102 runs in his 21-over effort, although he did get the wickets of Robinson and Ottis Gibson.

Essex had the entire fourth day to secure their victory, but did not slouch - their 191 runs were up inside 44.2 overs, England A left-hander Alastair Cook the fastest scorer with 59 off 69 balls while Zimbabwean keeper Andy Flower finished with 74 not out to lead Essex to their target. To compound Leicestershire's misery, they were deducted half a point for a slow over rate. (Cricinfo scorecard)

=== Leicestershire v Yorkshire (11–14 May) ===
Yorkshire (17pts) beat Leicestershire (5pts) by six wickets

Yorkshire made an epic comeback against Leicestershire at Grace Road. Leicestershire won the toss and batted, scoring 278 with HD Ackerman top-scoring with a quick 85 not out - forging partnerships with everyone from 6 to 11, who were asked to block at the other end and thus were all out in single figures. After the Barbadian pace bowler Ottis Gibson had reduced Yorkshire to 151, getting Matthew Wood, Phil Jaques and Ian Harvey out in his 6-56, Leicestershire began the task of assembling a big lead. Everyone made some sort of contribution, but the most intriguing decision of the day was captain Ackerman's - with the lead of 403 and well over a day and a half left to play, he decided not to send fellow countryman Charl Willoughby in to bat and declared instead, thinking he would be more use with the new ball.

It backfired spectacularly. Wood (48), Jaques (37), Michael Vaughan (53) and Harvey (47) all made entertaining knocks, but it was Anthony McGrath who stole the show with a five-and-a-half-hour 165 not out - the grindstone of Yorkshire's amazing runchase, the highest in the Championship this season - indeed, the highest fourth-innings run chase in the club's history. Leicestershire's bowlers were smashed to all corners, Phil DeFreitas the only one who escaped with some respectability as he took two for 50 in eleven overs. Gibson, Leicestershire's best performer of the first innings, conceded 124 for no wicket the second time around. (Cricinfo scorecard)

=== Leicestershire v Surrey (15 May) ===
Leicestershire (4pts) beat Surrey (0pts) by 60 runs

Surrey Lions continued their miserable form in the Sunday League, as they went down to their fourth defeat in four matches to be at the very bottom of the National League table. Leicestershire Foxes batted first, making 194 for 9, as almost all of their batsmen scored below their batting average, apart from Dinesh Mongia, who made 67. Mongia followed this up with 4 for 15 with the ball, dismissing Surrey for 134, after Scott Newman and Mark Ramprakash had taken them to 55 for 1. A total of 10 maiden overs were bowled in the Surrey innings. (Cricinfo scorecard)

=== Warwickshire v Leicestershire (17 May) ===
Warwickshire beat Leicestershire by 83 runs to progress to the Quarter-Finals of the C&G Trophy

Dougie Brown took a wicket in each of his first three overs to help a poor Warwickshire one-day side to victory at Edgbaston. Warwickshire batted first, and the hosts were on 78 for two after 15 overs, with Nick Knight (69) and Ian Bell (35) in control. Then Bell was stumped attacking a ball from Claude Henderson leaving the score on 116 for 3 in the 22nd over. There then was a collapse as 5 fell for 64, before Heath Streak and Tony Frost put on 55 in the last 9 overs to lift Warwickshire to 235.

In Leicestershire's innings immediately faltered as Brown's wickets reduced them to 16 for 3. Brown was helped by good tight bowling from Heath Streak at the other end, which meant they chose to attack Brown. Leicestershire tried to rebuild, but never managed it, finally being dismissed for 152 with 6.3 overs to go. (Cricinfo scorecard)

=== Derbyshire v Leicestershire (26–29 May) ===
Leicestershire (19pts) beat Derbyshire (5pts) by 4 wickets

Derbyshire lost wickets slowly but surely at Derby as only Australian Michael di Venuto stood tall against the Leicestershire onslaught, scoring 76. Eventually, Derbyshire declared on 251 for 9, as wickets were spread about evenly. Leicestershire replied well, with an opening partnership of 85, and a half-century from Dinesh Mongia took them to 188 for 2. But Graeme Welch took four for 48 as the last eight wickets fell for 91 runs, with only Darren Robinson's gritty four-hour century saving Leicestershire blushes. The Derbyshire reply was equally gritty, as 112 overs of cricket yielded only 259 runs, with di Venuto scoring 73 runs in a little less than five hours - although no bowler consistently threatened the Derbyshire batsmen. Derbyshire finished their second innings on 285, setting a target of 258, and Derbyshire dug out three early wickets for 48 runs. But 47 from Mongia along with half-centuries from HD Ackerman and John Sadler turned the match around, and Leicestershire made it to their target of 258 for the loss of six wickets. (Cricinfo scorecard)

=== Derbyshire v Leicestershire (30 May) ===
Derbyshire (4pts) beat Leicestershire by 6 wickets

Derbyshire's Kevin Dean took 5 for 45 in his comeback match after suffering chicken pox in the week. Dean's effort helped reduce Leicestershire Foxes to 55 for 6 at the end of the fifteenth over at Derby. John Sadler came in and made 50 before he was stumped off Ant Botha's bowling, but he could only help Leicestershire along to 146 all out. Derbyshire took their time in trying conditions, but still made their target with 4 wickets down and 21 balls to go, as Michael di Venuto top-scored with 48. (Cricinfo scorecard)

=== Leicestershire v Somerset (1–4 June) ===
Leicestershire (10pts) drew with Somerset (7pts)

Rain prevented any play on the first day at Oakham. The second day saw Leicestershire score 294 for 7, with HD Ackerman striking a century. They finished their innings on 338 a few overs into the third morning. Somerset did not apply themselves well in their reply, as they were dismissed cheaply for 105, and Leicestershire enforced the follow-on with a lead of 233 and just over a day still to play. John Francis scored a battling century as Somerset worked hard for the draw on the last day. They lost only 3 wickets as they effectively put up shop, scoring 225 in 100 overs to get the 4 points. (Cricinfo scorecard)

=== Leicestershire v Somerset (5 June) ===
Leicestershire (4pts) beat Somerset (0pts) by 71 runs

Leicestershire Foxes moved out of the bottom place with a comfortable win over Somerset Sabres at Oakham School. With Dinesh Mongia top-scoring with 75 as no Somerset bowler dug into the Leicestershire innings, they made 217 for 4 with relative ease, before crumbling to the left-arm spin of Mongia, as he took four wickets for 12 runs including captain and top-scorer Graeme Smith. Smith made 61 in a Somerset innings were only four batsmen made it into double figures, and the visitors crumbled to 146 all out. (Cricinfo scorecard)

=== Leicestershire v Australians (11 June) ===
The Australians beat Leicestershire by 95 runs

The Australians put in a strong performance at Grace Road, with Matthew Hayden making 107 off 96 balls, Damien Martyn 85 off 103 and Andrew Symonds 92 off 59 as they made a huge 321 for 4 off their 50 overs. 72 of their runs came off the final 5 overs. Leicestershire never threatened in reply, with Ottis Gibson, who came in at 8, the only man to make 50. Gibson had earlier taken two wickets for Leicestershire, who finished well short of the target on 226 for 8. (Cricinfo scorecard)

=== Leicestershire v Yorkshire (12 June) ===
Leicestershire (4pts) beat Yorkshire (0pts) by 7 wickets

In a low-scoring match at Grace Road, Yorkshire recorded 172 for 9, despite Anthony McGrath and Michael Lumb pairing up for 67 for the third wicket. Apart from those two, though, none of the Yorkshire batsmen could contribute, and slow accumulation from the Leicestershire batsmen was the key to reaching the target. Dinesh Mongia then took on Yorkshire's bowlers, adding 46 off 38 balls, as singles were taken near the end to see the hosts to the target with seventeen deliveries left in the match. (Cricinfo scorecard)

=== Leicestershire v Worcestershire (15–18 June) ===
Leicestershire (18pts) beat Worcestershire (6pts) by 12 runs

Worcestershire were on top of Leicestershire for three and a half days at Grace Road, yet lost the match. Despite Dinesh Mongia scoring a quickfire 66, Leicestershire could only scamper 225 in their first innings, Ray Price taking three for 29 with economical off-spin and Nadeem Malik taking his fourth career five-wicket-haul. In reply, Worcestershire made 323, young batsman Daryl Mitchell making a gruelling 63 not out in five hours while Zander de Bruyn top-scored with 67. Leicestershire then collapsed to 149 for 8, thanks to tight bowling from Price who got four wickets, but experienced wicketkeeper Paul Nixon lifted them with a fine 85 before being run out. The last two partnerships added 89 runs, lifting Worcestershire's target to 141 in about 50 overs - very gettable in most cases. And when Worcestershire were 95 for 4 with the two young batsmen Steven Davies and Mitchell at the crease, it still looked possible. But Davies trod on his wicket attempting to pull a short ball, Mitchell was lbw to Mongia, Ray Price was run out for a five-ball duck, and despite double-figure scores from Chaminda Vaas and Matt Mason Worcestershire fell thirteen short of their target. (Cricinfo scorecard)

=== Warwickshire v Leicestershire (19 June) ===
Leicestershire (4pts) beat Warwickshire (0pts) by seven wickets

The most striking feature of this match would be Ashley Giles returning to bowl for Warwickshire Bears after a hip injury, replacing Heath Streak, who had been injured in the groin in the previous match. However, it couldn't help them against Leicestershire Foxes. The hosts won the toss and batted first, and promptly crumbled to 43 for 4, after good new-ball bowling from Ottis Gibson and Charl Willoughby. Jonathan Trott hit 93, however, as the Bears recovered to 217 for 6. Their innings included three run outs. Leicestershire were always on target and won with eight balls to spare, Darren Maddy recording a 114-ball century and ending with 107 not out as Leicestershire reached 218 for 3. (Cricinfo scorecard)

=== Leicestershire v Scotland (20 June) ===
Leicestershire (4pts) beat Scotland (0pts) by 20 runs

The Scottish Saltires threw away a good bowling performance at Grace Road against Leicestershire Foxes. Winning the toss and batting first, Leicestershire only made 208 for 7, none of the batsmen passing fifty but seven finishing in double figures. Dewald Nel took three for 39 for the Scots, but nine overs of Charl Willoughby was evidently too much for the Saltires. He conceded 12 runs, taking two wickets and bowling three maidens in the process, and was a major factor as Scotland imploded to 78 for 6. Despite number 10 Greg Maiden making 35, Scotland were all out for 188 with an over remaining. (Cricinfo scorecard)

=== Leicestershire v Nottinghamshire (22 June) ===
Leicestershire (2pts) beat Nottinghamshire (0pts) by five wickets

A disciplined bowling and fielding effort, conceding only five extras, was the key to Leicestershire Foxes' win at Grace Road. Nottinghamshire Outlaws won the toss and batted first, but after Nottinghamshire skipper Stephen Fleming found four boundaries in his twelve-ball 24, Jeremy Snape and Dinesh Mongia tied down the Nottinghamshire batsmen. Only Leicestershire seamer Darren Maddy, who bowled two overs for 33, gave the visitors' total score of 143 for 8 a glimmer of respect. The chase was close and exciting, however, as Leicestershire lost HD Ackerman and Maddy in succession to go to 16 for 2. At 103 for 5, things looked grim, but a crucial partnership between Paul Nixon and Ottis Gibson won them the game with four balls to spare. (Cricinfo scorecard)

=== Derbyshire v Leicestershire (24 June) ===
Derbyshire (2pts) beat Leicestershire (0pts) by seven wickets (D/L method)

Derbyshire Phantoms beat last year's champions Leicestershire Foxes at The County Ground, Derby to be the only side with two victories in the North Division of the Twenty20 Cup. Bowling first turned out to be a stroke of genius, as the Leicestershire batsmen were tied down by Ian Hunter (three for 32) and Andre Botha (two for 19), and wickets were spread out as Leicestershire's last man, Claude Henderson, was caught on the last ball - all out for 137. Derbyshire's reply was shortened by rain, and they only got 14 overs to hit 103, and two wickets from David Masters set them back to 44 for 3. However, 42 from Luke Sutton ensured that Derbyshire made it to the target with seven balls to spare. (Cricinfo scorecard)

=== Leicestershire v Durham (26 June) ===
Leicestershire (2pts) beat Durham (0pts) by three runs

Durham Dynamos contrived to lose this one, having first had Leicestershire Foxes on the rack after limiting them to a total of 150 for 9. Economical bowling from Dale Benkenstein, who took two for 17, made that possible, but he was later to be the main culprit as Charl Willoughby and Jeremy Snape took wickets and refused to give him runs. He eventually finished on 18 from 17 balls, making the task of Gareth Breese and Gordon Muchall impossible - and Durham finished an agonising three runs short. (Cricinfo scorecard)

=== Lancashire v Leicestershire (27 June) ===
Lancashire (2pts) beat Leicestershire (0pts) by eight wickets

HD Ackerman was the only one who resisted a patient bowling display from Lancashire Lightning at their home ground, Old Trafford. Muttiah Muralitharan, the Sri Lankan off-spinner, took four for 19 in four overs, yet Ackerman made 79 not out amid the carnage, lifting Leicestershire Foxes to 146 for 7. However, Stuart Law took matters into his own hands, bludgeoning twelve fours and four sixes on his way to 92 not out - the highest score of the season so far - and Lancashire won with four wickets and 23 deliveries to spare. (Cricinfo scorecard)

=== Nottinghamshire v Leicestershire (30 June) ===
Leicestershire (2pts) beat Nottinghamshire (0pts) by 21 runs

Leicestershire Foxes took the win at Trent Bridge in a low-scoring match. Nottinghamshire Outlaws had won the toss and bowled first, and ought to have been pretty pleased with restricting the Foxes to 150 for 4, even though they conceded 15 extras. The opening partnership of HD Ackerman and Darren Maddy for 67 runs had promised more for Leicestershire. However, West Indian Ottis Gibson dug out two early wickets in Graeme Swann and Stephen Fleming - Darren Maddy and David Masters then took wickets at leisure, and Nottinghamshire were 96 for 7. Despite a rescue mission from Gareth Clough who hit 30 off 16 balls, there was no hitting power from the other players, and Nottinghamshire finished on 129 for 8. (Cricinfo scorecard)

=== Durham v Leicestershire (1 July) ===
Leicestershire (2pts) beat Durham (0pts) by 32 runs

Last year's champions Leicestershire Foxes were back on track for the quarter-finals thanks to 73 from John Sadler at the Riverside Ground. Sadler's 72-run second-wicket partnership with skipper HD Ackerman lifted the visitors to 154 for 7. Durham Dynamos yet again showed their inability to hit at anything significantly above 6 an over, Nicky Peng's top-score of 37 being off 41 balls. Despite captain Dale Benkenstein hitting 33 not out off 16 deliveries, it did not help, as Leicestershire smothered them to 122 for 7. (Cricinfo scorecard)

=== Leicestershire v Derbyshire (5 July) ===
Match abandoned; Leicestershire (1pt), Derbyshire (1pt)

No play was possible at Grace Road due to rain, but Leicestershire Foxes moved one step closer to the second place that guaranteed a quarter-final - the no-result meant that they were still two points ahead of Derbyshire Phantoms in third place, and dominating on net run-rate. (Cricinfo scorecard)

=== Leicestershire v Yorkshire (6 July) ===
Leicestershire (2pts) beat Yorkshire (0pts) by seven wickets

With a lot of luck with other results, Yorkshire Phoenix could have qualified for the quarter-finals with a win in this game against Leicestershire Foxes. However, as Ian Harvey's support batsmen failed to score at more than three an over until Anthony McGrath came in at five with the scoreboard on 84 for 3, their innings was eventually worth just 177 for 5 - Harvey making 77 of those and McGrath 33. In reply, opening batsman Darren Maddy anchored the innings with 72 not out, and Jeremy Snape saw off the required runs as he hit 39 off 23 balls and the Foxes won with nine balls and seven wickets to spare. Leicestershire, who needed a tie or better to be completely assured of the quarter-final spot, thus went through. (Cricinfo scorecard)

=== Somerset v Leicestershire (8–11 July) ===
Somerset (22pts) beat Leicestershire (6pts) by ten wickets

Graeme Smith was the difference between the two teams at Taunton. After Leicestershire had made 330 in the first innings, with wicket-keeper Paul Nixon top scoring with 62 not out, it was time for the South African captain. Farming the strike exquisitely, he smashed 27 fours and eleven sixes in a career highest score of 311 - while his partners were sensible enough to not leave him stranded. Thus, Somerset made 566, and Andy Caddick and Charl Langeveldt paired up with good fast bowling to send Leicestershire down to 189 for 6. All-rounder Ian Blackwell then took three tail-end wickets to leave a target of 18 runs with more than a day to spare, and Somerset knocked off the runs inside six overs to win by ten wickets. (Cricinfo scorecard)

=== Leicestershire v Australians (15–17 July) ===
Match drawn

Australia were having difficulty choosing between an out-of-form Jason Gillespie (8 wickets at a bowling average of 50.37 in the ODIs) and an almost equally out-of-form Michael Kasprowicz (7 wickets at 34.29), and thus this match with Leicestershire was a fight between the two to keep the place in the Test team. But the two almost exclusively failed to take wickets, with only Brett Lee and Stuart MacGill taking more than two for the match. Lee opened the game by removing Darren Robinson lbw for a golden duck, and Leicestershire eventually subsided for 217 - Australian Chris Rogers top-scoring with 56, Lee taking four for 53. Australia then amassed 582 for 7 over the next day and a half, Justin Langer (115), Ricky Ponting (119) and Damien Martyn with an unbeaten 154 all making centuries. However, it was Rogers who was to make the highest score of the match, as he added with Robinson for 247 for the first wicket - and went on to make a career highest score of 209, right in front of the Australian selectors. When the fifth Leicestershire wicket fell with the Leicestershire score on 363, both teams agreed to a draw. (Cricinfo scorecard)

=== Leicestershire v Middlesex (18 July) ===
Leicestershire beat Middlesex by 19 runs to progress to the Semi-Finals of the Twenty20 Cup

Defending champions Leicestershire Foxes reached their third successive appearances in the Twenty20 Cup semi-finals, after a fiery spell of bowling from South African Charl Willoughby helped them defend a potentially low target. Batting first, all the Leicestershire batsmen made reasonable contributions, but no one exceeded 40. With the help of 17 extras, Leicestershire finished on 159 for 6. However, Willoughby snared out three early wickets - finishing his spell of four overs with three for 11, including a rare maiden over - as Middlesex Crusaders crumbled to 16 for 3. When Jamie Dalrymple and Scott Styris threatened to win the game back with a partnership of 87, another South African, Claude Henderson rapped out two more wickets, and despite Styris being unbeaten on 73, Middlesex could only scamper 140 for 7. (Cricinfo scorecard)

=== Yorkshire v Leicestershire (20–23 July) ===
Yorkshire (17pts) beat Leicestershire (7pts) by six wickets

Australian Chris Rogers continued his fine run of form as his 93 gave Leicestershire a good start, which Ottis Gibson and Claude Henderson exploited by scoring 127 for the eighth wicket to lift Leicestershire to 366 all out. South African Deon Kruis got the four lowest-batting batsmen to end with respectable figures of four for 90, but Yorkshire did not use their innings well, as Gibson, Charl Willoughby and Stuart Broad took three wickets each and Yorkshire crumbled to 187.

Tim Bresnan then removed both the openers for ducks, but John Maunders and Chris Rogers made healthy knocks to take Leicestershire to a somewhat respectable 217 for a sizeable target - while Richard Dawson took four for 54 and Tim Bresnan added another man to his tally and finished with three for 44. Michael Wood and Joe Sayers set Yorkshire on track to chasing the target of 397, pairing up for 115 before Wood was caught out for 70, and Yorkshire were 132 for 1 overnight, setting up an intriguing chase. And, as in May when the teams met at Grace Road and Yorkshire chased a club record 406, Yorkshire recovered from a dismal first innings to take the victory. Sayers made 104, Anthony McGrath 55, and Ian Harvey an unbeaten 54 as Yorkshire reached the target, making their second highest fourth innings total to win in their 142-year history until this match - and both of those were against Leicestershire in 2005. (Cricinfo scorecard)

=== Scotland v Leicestershire (24 July) ===
Leicestershire (4pts) beat Scotland (0pts) by seven wickets

The Scottish Saltires, playing their first National League match following their ICC Trophy victory, fell down to earth brutally at The Grange. Despite Ryan Watson scoring 70 and Dougie Lockhart 42, there was little support, and the Scots only mustered 166 for 9 in 45 overs - Claude Henderson taking three for 25 for Leicestershire Foxes. Skipper Craig Wright bowled eight overs for ten runs, taking the wickets of Tom New and Darren Robinson in quick succession, but it helped little as Darren Maddy survived to make 95 not out and lead Leicestershire to a seven-wicket win with nine overs to spare. (Cricinfo scorecard)

=== Leicestershire v Essex (26–29 July) ===
Leicestershire (11pts) drew with Essex (8pts)

Ronnie Irani and Alastair Cook, who both made fifties, lifted Essex to 297 after being put in to bat at Grace Road. David Masters was Leicestershire's best bowler, with four for 65, and he bowled eleven maidens in 25 overs. However, Masters and the rest of the Leicestershire middle order showed precariously little resistance with the bat, as Darren Gough took two quick wickets before stumps on day 1 and Tony Palladino joined in with two more as Leicestershire imploded to 20 for 4. John Maunders and Aftab Habib lifted Leicestershire to a more respectable score, but they were still 132 for 6 at close on day 2, with half the second day's play lost due to rain. The third day was rained off, and on the fourth day Habib went on to make an unbeaten 153, Leicestershire declared on 382 for 8, and the match ended in a draw as Essex easily survived 29 overs to make 80 for 2. (Cricinfo scorecard)

=== Leicestershire v Somerset (30 July) ===
Somerset won by four runs and progress to the Twenty20 Cup final

Defending champions Leicestershire Foxes failed to take care of an excellent position against Somerset Sabres, as the second semi-final became a low-scoring, yet thrilling affair. After Dinesh Mongia had taken three for 30 to set Somerset back to 139 for 7 after Graeme Smith (with 29), Matthew Wood (38) and Marcus Trescothick (25) had lifted them to 89 for 1 at one point during the innings. Carl Gazzard, Somerset's young wicketkeeper, made 26 to lift them to a final total of 157 for 9.

In reply, Darren Maddy and HD Ackerman lifted Leicestershire to 74 for no loss after eight overs, requiring "only" 83 from the last twelve. However, Ian Blackwell took three quick wickets to send Leicestershire to 90 for 3, Richard Johnson (figures of 3-0-21-3), Keith Parsons (3-0-15-0) and William Durston (3-0-18-1) bowled tightly to frustrate the Leicestershire batsmen, and despite a last-ball six from Paul Nixon, Somerset won by four runs and qualified for the final, where they would be facing Lancashire Lightning. (Cricinfo scorecard)

=== Leicestershire v Lancashire (3–6 August) ===
Lancashire (19pts) beat Leicestershire (5pts) by 234 runs

Leicestershire were in the game at Grace Road for exactly two days, after having Lancashire effectively 68 for 3 in the second innings. However, they lost it from there, and Lancashire took the win to go into second place in the Championship table. Lancashire had won the toss and batted first, with Iain Sutcliffe top scoring with 93, as nine batsmen made it into double figures but only Sutcliffe managed a fifty. Medium pacer Ryan Cummins got three for 32 in his first game for Leicestershire, but only bowled ten overs, as the captain preferred an ineffective but economical Claude Henderson. After making their way to 16 for 0 on the first day, Leicestershire fell apart twice, first from 69 for 0 to 78 for 4 and then from 160 for 5 to 183 for 8. However, Aftab Habib made 84 to lift them to 261, only 30 behind Lancashire's first-innings score.

In Lancashire's second innings, Ottis Gibson got two quick wickets as Lancashire fell to 22 for 3 shortly before stumps on the second day, but Australians Stuart Law and Andrew Symonds batted well together with a 111-run partnership before Law was out to Henderson. Symonds powered on from there, bludgeoning 17 fours in his 121, and Glen Chapple and Warren Hegg made season-best scores of 60 and 77 respectively as they added for 121 for the eighth wicket. Lancashire declared on 368 for 9, not bothering to send in James Anderson to bat, thinking he might be better use with the ball. Indeed, he was - he took three for 39 before stumps on day three, as Leicestershire collapsed to 78 for 5 in chase of 399. There wasn't much respite on the fourth day either - after Dinesh Mongia and Habib had added 27, Anderson came back with two quick wickets, finishing with five for 79. Dominic Cork and debutant leg-spinner Simon Marshall wrapped up the Leicestershire chase as they were all out for 164. (Cricinfo scorecard)

=== Sussex v Leicestershire (7 August) ===
Leicestershire (4pts) beat Sussex (0pts) by six wickets

Leicestershire Foxes eked out a last-ball victory over Sussex Sharks to tighten up the title battle in Division Two of the National League. Batting first, Sussex were tied down by Ottis Gibson, as the Barbadian seamer took four for 37 with three maidens in his nine overs. Chris Adams top-scored with 78, while Rana Naved-ul-Hasan blasted 45 off just 31 balls to propel Sussex to a competitive 223 for 8. Sussex fast bowler James Kirtley then bowled a maiden to begin Leicestershire's innings, and had Tom New caught for an eight-ball duck later. However, Darren Maddy and HD Ackerman added 185 for the second wicket, and despite wickets tumbling around him, Ackerman finished on an unbeaten 114, hitting the winning four off the last ball. (Cricinfo scorecard)

=== Surrey v Leicestershire (9 August) ===
Surrey (4pts) beat Leicestershire (0pts) by six wickets

HD Ackerman lifted Leicestershire Foxes to a big target against Surrey Lions at The Oval, having opted to bat first after winning the toss. His 78 gave Leicestershire a good platform after losing the first three wickets for 85, and Paul Nixon and Jeremy Snape both scored with a batting strike rate above 150 to get Leicestershire to 258 for 5. Leicestershire dug out three Surrey wickets early, but a massive partnership between Mark Ramprakash and Ali Brown worth 166 runs turned the match around, and despite Charl Willoughby having Ramprakash caught behind, Brown paired up with Azhar Mahmood to hit Surrey to the target with more than five overs to spare. Brown's 108 not out was off only 63 balls, including sixteen boundaries. (Cricinfo scorecard)

=== Durham v Leicestershire (12–15 August) ===
Leicestershire (12pts) drew with Durham (10pts)

Rain intervened on both the first two days at Riverside, limiting play to 56.1 overs, compared to the expected 200 on fine days, and that was probably a major cause of the drawn game. Durham ground their way to 260 for 3 amid the rain, however, Michael Hussey smashing five sixes in his third Championship century of the season, for 146 runs. David Masters was the star of the third day, though, completing a six-wicket-haul as Durham lost their last seven wickets for 55 runs to end with a first-innings total of 315. In reply, Liam Plunkett took two early wickets, but Dinesh Mongia's unbeaten 77 saw Leicestershire to stumps on day three - still trailing by 98 runs with seven wickets in hand. Leicestershire batted on for 50 overs on day four, Gareth Breese taking five for 91 as Leicestershire were bowled out for 443, while Mongia notched up 29 boundaries in his only first-class century of the season, finishing with 164 before he was stumped off Breese. With 50 overs remaining and one innings to go for both sides, Durham just took their time at the crease as batting practice, Hussey boosting his batting average with 61 not out. (Cricinfo scorecard)

=== Durham v Leicestershire (16 August) ===
Durham (4pts) beat Leicestershire (0pts) by eight wickets

Durham Dynamos took a vital win in the promotion battle with Leicestershire Foxes. Michael Lewis took four for 13 as Leicestershire could only make 113 at Riverside, with only Darren Robinson passing 20. Neil Killeen and Liam Plunkett also chipped in with two wickets each. Paul Collingwood then slashed 51 not out from number three to guide Durham to the target with 18.4 overs and eight wickets to spare. (Cricinfo scorecard)

=== Leicestershire v Sussex (21 August) ===
Leicestershire (4pts) beat Sussex (0pts) by five wickets

Leicestershire Foxes recorded their second win over Sussex Sharks in two weeks to close the gap at the top of Division Two of the National League to two points. Having been put in the field by the Sussex captain Chris Adams, Leicestershire grabbed the first four wickets for 44 runs, and despite a 72-run fifth-wicket partnership between Michael Yardy and Carl Hopkinson, Sussex could only muster 186 all out - Dinesh Mongia taking the last two wickets, while conceding 17 from two overs. Mongia also contributed with the bat - after the Sussex bowlers had made things tricky for Leicestershire's top order, reducing them to 27 for 2 and then 103 for 5, Mongia remained at the crease to make 92 at just under a run a ball to see Leicestershire past the target with seven balls to spare. (Cricinfo scorecard)

=== Leicestershire v Warwickshire (22 August) ===
Match abandoned without a ball bowled; Leicestershire (2pts), Warwickshire (2pts)

Leicestershire Foxes and Warwickshire Bears were looking to fight it out for a spot in the top three, but rain made play impossible at Grace Road, and the teams shared the spoils. (Cricinfo scorecard)

=== Leicestershire v Northamptonshire (24–27 August) ===
Leicestershire (12pts) drew with Northamptonshire (8pts)

Leicestershire's first innings lasted three days, in which time they scored 390 runs for the loss of six wickets. The rain meant that only 119 overs were possible in three days. Leicestershire declared 22 balls into the fourth morning after getting 400, and spent the rest of the last day bowling Northamptonshire out for 261, Claude Henderson taking a season-best five for 63. With only one completed innings for each side, the match ended in a draw. (Cricinfo scorecard)

=== Worcestershire v Leicestershire (30 August-2 September) ===
Leicestershire (12pts) drew with Worcestershire (9pts)

Opener John Maunders batted for four hours for his first century of the first class season, and a further two hours to make a total of 148, which helped Leicestershire to a solid total of 407 at New Road - yet the slow nature of his batting meant there was little time to force a victory. Paul Nixon also hit a three-hour fifty for Leicestershire, while Kabir Ali got the best bowling figures with four for 95, including nine no-balls and one wide. Spinners Ray Price and Chris Gayle took a total of five wickets in their 32.1 overs, while both Shoaib Akhtar and Gareth Batty went wicketless. Worcestershire's batsmen all got starts, but not much more, and David Masters dug out both openers to end with three for 49 as Worcestershire were all out for 290 - Claude Henderson taking care of the last four wickets with nine balls, to end with four for 72 in the innings.

Leicestershire lost both openers to Kabir Ali who took three wickets at a cost of more than five runs an over as Aftab Habib and Tom New hit plenty of runs off him. Habib made 90, as Leicestershire declared on 255 for 5, setting Worcestershire 371 in five hours, but the chase was halted by bad light. When it finally got underway, Worcestershire crashed to 87 for 4 after two wickets from Charl Willoughby, but fifties from Ben Smith and Gareth Batty saved the draw for Worcestershire. (Cricinfo scorecard)

=== Yorkshire v Leicestershire (4 September) ===
Leicestershire (4pts) beat Yorkshire (0pts) by 133 runs

Leicestershire Foxes were put in to bat at Headingley, and after their top five all passed into double figures, Leicestershire made their way to 251 for 8 as Darren Maddy and Aftab Habib made half-centuries. Yorkshire Phoenix spinner and captain Richard Dawson had three men caught for 41 runs to end with the best bowling figures for Yorkshire. Leicestershire's Ottis Gibson also got three wickets, but at a cheaper rate, as the Phoenix fell to 57 for 7. Dawson hung about with wicket-keeper Simon Guy, but Jeremy Snape ended the innings with two wickets to bowl Yorkshire out for 120. Guy was the only batsman to pass 25, despite batting at nine. (Cricinfo scorecard)

=== Leicestershire v Derbyshire (6 September) ===
Derbyshire (4pts) beat Leicestershire (0pts) by six wickets

In a low-scoring match at Grace Road, Leicestershire Foxes could take little advantage out of winning the toss and batting first. Two wickets from Derbyshire Phantoms' Australian all-rounder Jon Moss sent Leicestershire struggling to 42 for 4, and only an attritional partnership between Aftab Habib and Darren Robinson carried them past 100. Paul Nixon and Jeremy Snape hit the singles reasonably well, but at the end of 45 overs, Leicestershire had only managed 164 for 8. Steve Stubbings and Michael di Venuto gave Derbyshire a good start in the reply, adding 62 for the first wicket, and despite Stubbings and Chris Bassano falling in successive overs, Derbyshire were never troubled. A well-paced chase finished on 168 for 4 with five overs potentially remaining. (Cricinfo scorecard)

=== Leicestershire v Derbyshire (8–11 September) ===
Leicestershire (12pts) drew with Derbyshire (5pts)

Derbyshire pacer Ian Hunter continued on his good form from the last Championship match, where he took five for 63 against Durham, as he removed Leicestershire opener John Maunders for 0 in the second over of the match at Grace Road. That was as good as it got for Hunter and Durham, though, as Darren Robinson and Tom New pounded their bowlers 217 in four and a half hours, as Leicestershire turned the match from the difficult position of 4 for 1. Nevertheless, one and a half days prevented them from forcing a victory. HD Ackerman, Dinesh Mongia and Paul Nixon also passed fifty, as Leicestershire declared having made 552 for 6. Derbyshire then crashed to 62 for 3 at the close of play on day two, but were saved by rain, as the third day's play was cancelled. In 50 overs on day four, Charl Willoughby and Stuart Broad took two wickets each as Derbyshire were all out for 190, but there was no time for another innings and the match was declared a draw. (Cricinfo scorecard)

=== Leicestershire v Faisalabad (15 September) ===
No result; Leicestershire (2pts) beat Faisalabad (0pts) 5–3 in bowl-out

Rain fell steadily on Grace Road as the second of three scheduled Twenty20 matches in the Twenty20 Club Championship on 15 September 2005 was rained off. The match result was decided by an indoor bowl out competition, which Leicestershire won 5–3. (Cricinfo scorecard)

=== Leicestershire v Somerset (16 September) ===
Leicestershire (2pts) beat Somerset (0pts) by 66 runs

The hosts Leicestershire Foxes could conceivably have been knocked out of the tournament with a loss in this match, but three knocks worth more than 35 runs and bowling two maiden overs helped them to a 66-run win. HD Ackerman (run-a-ball 28) and Darren Maddy (42) hit plenty of boundaries in the opening overs to give Leicestershire 76 runs for the first wicket. Maddy took a particular liking to young seamer Richard Woodman, whom he took for 16 in an over. Then, both openers fell within the space of three balls, but Dinesh Mongia pushed onward with John Sadler, to add 79 for the third wicket. A few lofted shots to fielders in the deep led to three catches in the final overs, and the final score was 171 for 6, Woodman repairing his figures somewhat with a 19th over that yielded two wickets and went for only five runs, and Leicestershire only added 15 from their last 15 balls.

Somerset Sabres started positively in the chase, making their way to 32 for 2 after four overs, but a wicket maiden over from David Masters - including the wicket of Somerset captain Ian Blackwell - set them back. Their batsmen from three through seven were all dismissed in single figures, and though John Francis made 49, Somerset still needed 91 for the last three wickets. 18-year-old wicket-keeper Sam Spurway made his Somerset debut in this match, standing in for the injured Carl Gazzard, and Spurway made 15 not out, seeing out the last overs as Somerset closed on 106 for 8 to be knocked out of the tournament. (Cricinfo scorecard)

=== Leicestershire v Chilaw Marians (17 September) ===
Chilaw Marians won by nine runs and qualified for the International 20:20 Club Championship Final

Chilaw Marians failed to convert 33 for 1 after four overs into an above-average total against Leicestershire Foxes, as David Masters' medium pace bowling shook up the visitors. Masters got a wicket in each of his first three overs, ending with figures of 4-1-7-3. With the score 57 for 6 after 10.3 overs, Chilaw were forced to consolidate, although captain Hasantha Fernando hit two straight sixes off Dinesh Mongia. However, Ottis Gibson came back to rip out two wickets at the death, and Chilaw Marians closed on 112 for 9.

The Leicestershire batsmen, however, decided to offer their pads to everything, and the fast bowlers Manoj Chanaka and Hasantha Fernando shared five wickets in the opening seven overs - three lbw, one bowled as the ball hit the pad and then the stumps, and one clean bowled. No batsman passed 15 in the first ten overs, in which Leicestershire lost six men, and only HD Ackerman got into double figures. Leicestershire needed a rebuilding effort from Jim Allenby and Jeremy Snape, but Snape was caught behind off by slow left arm bowler Dinuka Hettiarachchi, leaving them needing 70 runs to win for the last four wickets. Two further lbws set them 26 from the last two overs - after a 27-run stand between Ottis Gibson and Paul Nixon, and despite Charl Willoughby hitting a six with the first ball of the final over, the last two batsman were run out, giving Chilaw a nine-run victory. (Cricinfo scorecard)

=== Lancashire v Leicestershire (21–23 September) ===
Leicestershire (17pts) beat Lancashire (3pts) by four runs

Leicestershire prevailed in a match at Old Trafford where 726 runs were scored in four completed innings and Leicestershire's young bowler Stuart Broad and captain HD Ackerman starred. Leicestershire chose to bat after winning the toss, and were taken apart by Glen Chapple and Murali Kartik, who shared nine wickets, while the highest partnership for Leicestershire was worth 53. The lack of veteran bowler Dominic Cork did not seem to bother Lancashire unduly, as Chapple got five wickets for 22 runs and Kartik four for 43. Only Jon Maunders and HD Ackerman passed 20 for the visitors, and they were all out for 165. Lancashire accumulated runs slowly, and their score was 61 for 2 at the close of play on the first day. With Mal Loye out with an injury, Lancashire posted 191, Maunders taking four for 28 and Stuart Broad three for 57 to limit Lancashire's lead to 26 runs. An opening partnership of 63 saw Leicestershire take the lead, but spinners Murali Kartik and Andrew Symonds took two wickets each, while the three seamers Chapple, Sajid Mahmood and Anderson took one each to round off the day. Ackerman was left overnight on 37 - 11 short of the highest score in the match so far.

Ackerman added 30 to his overnight score, but was eventually bowled by Anderson, who took three wickets on the third day to end with innings figures of four for 45. Lancashire were set 175 to win, and at one point needed 102 with nine wickets in hand. However, England Under-19 prodigy Stuart Broad removed three men for five runs with his seam bowling, and wickets fell regularly after that - Dinesh Mongia and Charl Willoughby taking two each. Lancashire eventually needed 18 for the last wicket to win, and Mal Loye stepped in to bat despite an injury - he battled for half an hour, scoring three runs, but his batting partner Anderson was caught by Darren Robinson, leaving Lancashire all out for 170, five runs short of victory. However, despite the loss, Lancashire were almost assured of the Division Two victory, as their main competitors Yorkshire were still trailing in their match with Northamptonshire. (Cricinfo scorecard)

=== Leicestershire v Kent (25 September) ===
Leicestershire (4pts) beat Kent (0pts) by 40 runs on the Duckworth-Lewis method

Leicestershire Foxes recorded 280 for 5 batting first at Grace Road, with captain HD Ackerman leading from the front with 78. Half-centuries also came from Darren Maddy and Dinesh Mongia, while the medium pace of Neil Dexter yielded two wickets - but conceded 33 runs in five overs. Kent Spitfires got off to a good start, with Darren Stevens hitting twelve fours and a six in his 76 - adding 106 with Martin van Jaarsveld. However, once rain shortened their innings to 33 overs and their target from 281 to 211, they failed to keep up with the required rate, ending with 170 for 6 with England Under-19 player Stuart Broad taking two for 35. (Cricinfo scorecard)
