= Derbyshire County Cricket Club in 2003 =

2003 season of an English cricket team

Derbyshire County Cricket Club seasons
2003 season
- Captain: Dominic Cork
- County Championship: Div 2 - 9
- National League: Div 2 - 6
- Cheltenham and Gloucester Trophy: Semi-final
- Twenty20 Cup.: Group
- Most runs: Michael Di Venuto
- Most wickets: Graeme Welch
- Most catches: Luke Sutton

Derbyshire County Cricket Club in 2003 was the cricket season when the English club Derbyshire had been playing for one hundred and thirty-six years. They reached the semi-final in the Cheltenham and Gloucester Trophy. In the County Championship, they finished ninth in the second division and in the National League, they finished sixth in the second division. They were eliminated at group level in the North section of the Twenty20 Cup.

== 2003 season ==
Derbyshire was in Division 2 of the County Championship and finished in sixth position. In addition to the Championship, they played Cambridge University. Of their seventeen first class games, they won two and lost eleven, the remainder being drawn. Derbyshire was in Division 2 of the NatWest Pro40 League in which they won eight of their eighteen matches to finish sixth in the division. In the Cheltenham and Gloucester Trophy, Derbyshire reached the semi-finals. In the Twenty20 Cup, Derbyshire played in the North Division and won three matches. Dominic Cork was in his sixth season as captain. Michael Di Venuto was top scorer and Graeme Welch took most wickets.

== Matches ==
=== First Class ===
List of matches
No.	Date	V	Result	Margin	Notes
1	18 Apr 2003	Glamorgan; County Ground, Derby	Drawn		MJ Di Venuto 121; LD Sutton 120; Maynard 142
2	30 Apr 2003	Somerset; County Ground, Derby	Drawn		Cox 126; DG Cork 5-74
3	9 May 2003	Yorkshire; Headingley, Leeds	Won	166 runs	LD Sutton 127; Sidebottom 7-97
4	21 May 2003	Durham; Riverside Ground, Chester-le-Street	Lost	30 runs	MJ Di Venuto 150; G Welch 5-60
5	30 May 2003	Worcestershire; County Ground, Derby	Lost	9 wickets	Hick 155
6	04 Jun 2003	Glamorgan; St Helen's, Swansea	Lost	Innings and 70 runs	Croft 6-71
7	27 Jun 2003	Northamptonshire; County Ground, Northampton	Lost	180 runs	NRC Dumelow 5-82 and 5-78; Swann 7-33
8	02 Jul 2003	Yorkshire; County Ground, Derby	Lost	10 wickets	White 173; G Welch 6-102; Sidebottom 6-38
9	09 Jul 2003	Gloucestershire; County Ground, Derby	Lost	5 wickets	MJ Di Venuto 148; Lewis 6-48
10	15 Jul 2003	Worcestershire; County Ground, New Road, Worcester	Lost	Innings and 42 runs	Mason 5-43; Kabir Ali 8-58
11	24 Jul 2003	Durham; County Ground, Derby	Drawn		Wells 106; MJ Di Venuto 143
12	13 Aug 2003	Hampshire; The Rose Bowl, Southampton	Won	Innings and 43 runs	DG Cork 6-28
13	20 Aug 2003	Northamptonshire; County Ground, Derby	Lost	Innings and 231 runs	Hussey 115; Jaques 123; Sales 200
14	28 Aug 2003	South African cricket team in England in 2003; County Ground, Derby	Drawn		Kallis 200
15	03 Sep 2003	Gloucestershire; County Ground, Bristol	Lost	20 runs	Rhodes 137; SD Stubbings 103; Lewis 7-117; Fisher 5-73
16	10 Sep 2003	Somerset; County Ground, Taunton	Lost	27 runs	Blackwell 247; AI Gait 110; DG Cork 6-92
17	17 Sep 2003	Hampshire; County Ground, Derby	Lost	10 wickets	Katich 122;Hamblin 6-93; Tomlinson 6-63

=== National League ===
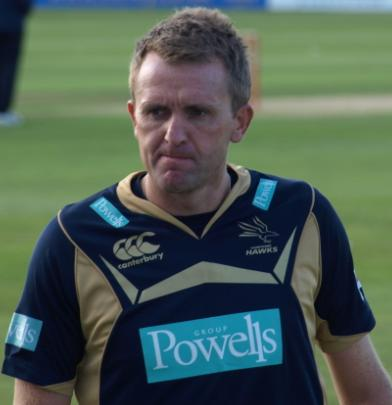
Dominic Cork - captain in 2003

List of matches
No.	Date	V	Result	Margin	Notes
1	27 Apr 2003	Middlesex; Lord's Cricket Ground, St John's Wood	Lost	5 wickets	
2	4 May 2003	Somerset; County Ground, Derby	Won	15 runs	
3	5 May 2003	Nottinghamshire; Trent Bridge, Nottingham	Lost	1 wicket	Pieterson 130
4	18 May 2003	Northamptonshire; County Ground, Northampton	No Result		
5	20 May 2003	Scotland; Grange Cricket Club Ground, Raeburn Place, Edinburgh	Won	6 wickets	
6	25 May 2003	Durham; Riverside Ground, Chester-le-Street	Abandoned		
7	15 Jun 2003	Lancashire; County Ground, Derby	Lost	5 runs	
8	13 Jul 2003	Sussex; Arundel Castle Cricket Club Ground	Won	6 wickets	Goodwin 129; CWG Bassano 126
9	23 Jul 2003	Nottinghamshire; County Ground, Derby	Lost	5 wickets	
10	03 Aug 2003	Middlesex; County Ground, Derby	Lost	4 wickets	MJ Di Venuto 106
11	04 Aug 2003	Lancashire; Old Trafford, Manchester	Lost	8 wickets	
12	10 Aug 2003	Sussex; County Ground, Derby	Won	6 wickets	
13	17 Aug 2003	Hampshire; The Rose Bowl, Southampton	Lost	6 wickets	
14	24 Aug 2003	Northamptonshire; County Ground, Derby |	Won	3 wickets	Hussey 103; MJ Di Venuto 130
15	31 Aug 2003	Durham; County Ground, Derby	Lost	11 runs	
16	07 Sep 2003	Scotland; County Ground, Derby	Won	8 wickets	CWG Bassano 108
17	14 Sep 2003	Somerset; County Ground, Taunton	Won	2 wickets	MJ Di Venuto 113
18	21 Sep 2003	Hampshire; County Ground, Derby	Won	9 runs	

=== Friends Provident Trophy ===
List of matches
No.	Date	V	Result	Margin	Notes
3rd Rnd	7 May 2003	Kent Cricket Board; St Lawrence Ground, Canterbury	Won	171 runs	CWG Bassano 101
4th Rnd	28 May 2003	Glamorgan; Sophia Gardens, Cardiff	Won	7 wickets	CWG Bassano 121
Qtr-Final	11 Jun 2003	Surrey; County Ground, Derby	Won	137 runs	
Semi-final	07 Aug 2003	Gloucestershire; County Ground, Bristol	Lost	1 wicket	

=== Twenty20 Cup ===
List of matches
No.	Date	V	Result	Margin	Notes
1	14 Jun 2003	Yorkshire; Headingley, Leeds	Lost	45 runs	
2	19 Jun 2003	Nottinghamshire; County Ground, Derby	Won	9 wickets	
3	21 Jun 2003	Lancashire; Old Trafford, Manchester	Won	7 wickets	
4	23 Jun 2003	Durham; County Ground, Derby	Won	6 runs	
5	24 Jun 2003	Leicestershire; Grace Road, Leicester	Lost	1 run	Grove 6-22

== Statistics ==
=== Competition batting averages ===
Name	H	County Championship						National League,						Cheltenham and Gloucester Trophy						Twenty20 Cup					
Name	H	M	I	Runs	HS	Ave	100	M	I	Runs	HS	Ave	100	M	I	Runs	HS	Ave	100	M	I	Runs	HS	Ave	100
CWG Bassano		11	21	271	53*	15.05	0	16	15	559	126*	46.58	2	4	4	265	121	66.25	2	5	3	76	43	25.33	0
DG Cork		16	29	593	92	22.80	0	16	14	279	49	21.46	0	4	3	75	59	25.00	0	5	5	45	25	9.00	0
KJ Dean		15	24	148	30*	7.04	0	15	7	30	12	10.00	0	4	2	4	2	2.00	0						
MJ Di Venuto		16	31	1520	150	49.03	5	15	14	655	130	46.78	3	3	3	76	51	25.33	0	5	5	198	67	66.00	0
NRC Dumelow		9	17	347	75	24.78	0	13	11	86	28*	10.75	0	2	2	25	15	12.50	0	5	4	17	12	4.25	0
AI Gait		12	24	662	110	27.58	1	7	7	112	37	18.66	0	3	3	96	87*	48.00	0	2	1	2	2	2.00	0
NEL Gunter		2	2	29	20*		0	3	1	5	5	5.00								3	2	11	9*		0
Hassan Adnan		2	4	189	84	63.00	0	1	1	29	29	29.00	0												
CZ Harris								4	4	30	23*	10.00	0												
PMR Havell		3	6	10	7*	10.00	0	1	0																
DR Hewson		8	16	222	57	13.87	0	16	14	274	50	21.07	0	4	3	140	69	46.66	0	5	3	42	36	14.00	0
M Kaif		8	15	332	87	22.13	0	8	8	225	70	32.14	0	2	2	153	81	76.50	0	5	5	75	53	18.75	0
RM Khan		8	15	322	76	21.46	0	2	2	7	5	3.50	0												
KM Krikken		1	2	15	14	7.50	0	1	0											1	1	3	3*		0
T Lungley		5	8	80	29	11.42	0	7	5	56	30	14.00	0	3	2	1	1*	1.00	0	5	3	37	18*	18.50	0
Mohammad Ali		10	17	101	31	7.21	0	4	3	13	8*		0	1	0										
SA Selwood		9	17	333	88	20.81	0	11	9	240	88*	30.00	0	3	3	30	19	15.00	0	5	3	17	12	5.66	0
Shahid Afridi		3	6	92	67	15.33	0	4	4	41	35	13.66	0	1	1	23	23	23.00	0						
SD Stubbings		3	6	306	103	51.00	1	5	4	114	45	28.50	0												
LD Sutton		15	29	936	127	37.44	2	16	12	199	83	24.87	0	4	2	14	13	14.00	0	4	3	42	22*	21.00	0
G Welch		14	26	414	54	19.71	0	15	11	159	26	19.87	0	4	3	50	22	25.00	0	5	3	29	13	9.66	0
LJ Wharton		6	9	46	30	11.50	0	7	1	5	5*		0	2	1	0	0*		0						

=== Competition bowling averages ===
Name	H	County Championship					National League					Cheltenham and Gloucester Trophy					Twenty20 Cup				
Name	H	Balls	Runs	Wkts	Best	Ave	Balls	Runs	Wkts	Best	Ave	Balls	Runs	Wkts	Best	Ave	Balls	Runs	Wkts	Best	Ave
DG Cork		2665	1363	50	6-28	27.26	768	537	23	3-15	23.34	200	134	6	2-17	22.33	48	39	1	1-24	39.00
KJ Dean		2529	1506	41	4-39	36.73	714	508	13	2-17	39.07	192	125	8	3-6	15.62					
MJ Di Venuto		36	23	0													78	88	5	3-19	17.60
NRC Dumelow		1204	711	16	5-78	44.43	572	486	15	3-26	32.40	60	47	0			53	69	7	3-8	9.85
NEL Gunter		163	153	3	2-48	51.00	72	86	0								72	61	1	1-12	61.00
CZ Harris							216	141	4	2-27	35.25										
PMR Havell		466	369	10	3-34	36.90	12	17	0												
DR Hewson		24	14	0			379	349	15	4-25	23.26	78	50	2	1-18	25.00	114	109	10	4-18	10.90
M Kaif		24	21	1	1-21	21.00															
RM Khan		18	13	0																	
T Lungley		398	350	7	4-101	50.00	269	290	8	3-47	36.25	136	93	4	2-18	23.25	102	126	6	4-13	21.00
Mohammad Ali		1326	1060	28	4-79	37.85	177	178	4	2-23	44.50	60	28	1	1-28	28.00					
SA Selwood		42	28	0								12	7	1	1-7	7.00					
Shahid Afridi		328	147	4	2-29	36.75	132	103	2	1-25	51.50	60	45	2	2-45	22.50					
G Welch		2733	1394	53	6-102	26.30	703	567	20	3-44	28.35	179	134	9	4-26	14.88	114	177	2	1-15	88.50
LJ Wharton		690	364	9	4-50	40.44	240	202	4	2-37	50.50	72	50	3	2-31	16.66					

=== Wicket Keeping ===
Luke Sutton

County Championship Catches 25, Stumping 2
PRO40 Catches 21, Stumping 1
Friends Provident Catches 9, Stumping 0
Twenty20 Catches 2, Stumping 2

== See also ==
- Derbyshire County Cricket Club seasons
- 2003 English cricket season
