= Paul Nixon =

English cricketer

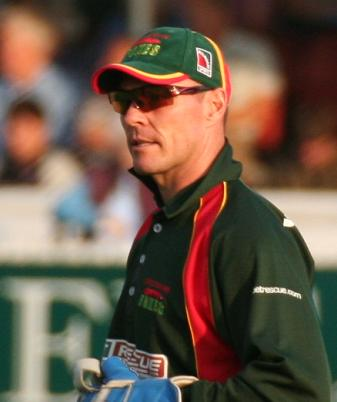

Personal information
- Full name: Paul Andrew Nixon
- Born: 21 October 1970 (age 56); Carlisle, Cumberland, England
- Nickname: Badger, Nico
- Height: 6 ft 0 in (1.83 m)
- Batting: Left-handed
- Bowling: Left-arm medium
- Role: Wicket-keeper

International information
- National side: England (2007)
- ODI debut (cap 199): 12 January 2007 v Australia
- Last ODI: 21 April 2007 v West Indies
- ODI shirt no.: 47
- Only T20I (cap 22): 9 January 2007 v Australia

Domestic team information
- Years: Team
- 1987: Cumberland
- 1989–1999: Leicestershire
- 2000–2002: Kent
- 2003–2011: Leicestershire

Career statistics
Competition	ODI	T20I	FC	LA
Matches	19	1	355	411
Runs scored	297	31	14,498	7,418
Batting average	21.21	–	34.35	26.30
100s/50s	0/0	0/0	21/72	1/34
Top score	49	31*	173*	101
Balls bowled	0	0	125	3
Wickets	–	–	1	0
Bowling average	–	–	157.00	–
5 wickets in innings	–	–	0	–
10 wickets in match	–	–	0	–
Best bowling	–	–	1/7	–
Catches/stumpings	20/3	0/1	889/69	421/99
- Source: ESPNcricinfo.com, 22 April 2012

Paul Andrew Nixon (born 21 October 1970) is an English cricket coach and former professional cricketer who played for Leicestershire, England, England A, Marylebone Cricket Club (MCC) and Kent. He is a wicket-keeper and left-handed batsman. Nixon played in twenty international matches for the England cricket team, all within a four-month spell in 2007.

== Style and personality ==
Since playing international cricket, Nixon has been known for his contributions from behind the stumps. On the matter, Nixon remarked, "I've been doing it for 19 years and no one ever noticed before! It's not sledging mind. It's banter – like playing golf with a mate. I'm just trying to get 'em away from their concentration really."

On the last day of the 2006 season, Nixon was used as a declaration bowler against Essex. He was clubbed for 69 off five overs, whilst Darren Robinson, bowling at the other end, was hit for 117 off just 4.4 overs. Mark Pettini smashed 114 off just 29 deliveries, a knock including 11 sixes. According to a BBC report, they both served up "10 overs of utter rubbish – on agreement – to allow Mark Pettini the easiest century he will ever hit."

In October 2007, Nixon said that he would join the Indian Cricket League, joining fellow English cricketers Darren Maddy and Vikram Solanki. He remarked, "This is an exciting opportunity, it is perfect timing. India is the mecca of cricket and Twenty20 interest is high due to the national team's success". He played two seasons for the Delhi Giants before the ICL folded.

Nixon is an ambassador for Dorothy Goodman School, a Special Educational Needs school in Hinckley, Leicestershire.

== County career ==
Nixon made his first-class debut in 1989 with Leicestershire and with them he won two Championship titles in 1996 and 1998.

He played for the club until 2000 when he moved to Kent. He spent 2 years playing for Kent but due to the emergence of Geraint Jones he was forced into returning to Leicestershire in 2003. During his second stint at Leicester, Nixon won the Twenty20 cup twice and helped them reach final day from 2003 to 2006. His highest score for Leicestershire was a career best 144 not out against Northamptonshire in 2006.

In July 2007, it was announced that Nixon had been appointed captain of Leicestershire until the end of the county season. The wicket-keeper took over from Darren Robinson, whilst Jeremy Snape remained in control of the one-day team. In August 2007, it was announced that Nixon would be the new club captain for all competitions, after signing a three-year contract.

=== First Class Centuries ===
Nixon has eighteen first-class centuries to his name, with sixteen for Leicestershire and two for Kent. On only two occasions has his team lost after he has scored a century. The first time was whilst playing for Kent against Warwickshire in August 2002, where he hit 103 and then performed well as a keeper by taking three catches and making two stumpings, however Kent lost by 10 wickets. The second time was a 177 run loss playing for Leicestershire against Northamptonshire in September 2007, where he scored 110, and took four catches.

For	Against	Date	Format	Result	Score
Leicestershire	Hampshire	June 1992	3-day	Draw	107*
Leicestershire	Lancashire	July 1993	4-day	Won by an innings & 58 runs	113*
Leicestershire	Northamptonshire	April 1994	4-day	Won by 10 wickets	106
Leicestershire	Essex	June/July 1994	4-day	Won by an innings & 49 runs	115
Leicestershire	Hampshire	September 1994	4-day	Won by 7 wickets	131
Leicestershire	Oxford	April 1996	3-day	Draw	100*
Leicestershire	Lancashire	May 1996	4-day	Draw	106
Leicestershire	Durham	September 1996	4-day	Won by an innings & 251 runs	103*
Leicestershire	Glamorgan	June 1998	4-day	Won by 140 runs	107*
Leicestershire	Surrey	September 1998	4-day	Won by an innings & 211 runs	101*
Leicestershire	Essex	April 1999	4-day	Won by an innings & 22 runs	121
Kent	Hampshire	August 2000	4-day	Won by 15 runs	134*
Kent	Warwickshire	August 2002	4-day	Lost by 10 wickets	103
Leicestershire	Kent	April 2003	4-day	Draw	113
Leicestershire	Gloucestershire	August 2006	4-day	Won by 4 wickets	103
Leicestershire	Northamptonshire	August 2006	4-day	Draw	144*
Leicestershire	Glamorgan	July 2007	4-day	Won by 10 wickets	126
Leicestershire	Northamptonshire	September 2007	4-day	Lost by 177 runs	110

* denotes not out

=== List A career ===
Nixon played 197 List A matches for Leicestershire, before moving to Kent and making 65 appearances there. He returned to Leicestershire for the 2003 season, and continued to feature for them until the end of the 2011 season. Other List A outings have been for England A, First Class Counties Select XI, England XI, and England.

Nixon made his first List A fifty in his 37th match, against Nottinghamshire, hitting 60 in a 7 wicket loss. He hit his only hundred to date, against Sri Lanka A, before totalling 53 against the same opposition, and 60 against Sri Lanka B. 96* followed against Kent, before hitting 51 against Ireland which would be his last fifty for 35 games.

He had to wait another 35 matches for his next fifty, which came for Kent against Surrey, and went on to hit two more half centuries for the Spitfires. After returning to Leicestershire, he hit four fifties in his first nineteen games, but then had to wait forty-four matches for his next landmark innings. Three half centuries in the 2006 season followed, and his form continued for England over the winter, and then his domestic team in the 2007 season.

Nixon hit over 6000 List A runs, with landmarks being reached at various speeds along the way:

- 1000 runs, match 80, for Leicestershire against Sussex, in August 1994, making 14, and finishing the game with 1013 runs
- 2000 runs, match 151, for Leicestershire against Warwickshire, in May 1998, making 36, and finishing the game with 2027 runs
- 3000 runs, match 195, for Leicestershire against Essex, in August 1999, making 20*, and finishing the game with 3014 runs
- 4000 runs, match 254, for Kent against Worcestershire, in July 2002, making 60, and finishing the game with 4002 runs
- 5000 runs, match 306, for Leicestershire against Durham, in April 2005, making 29, and finishing the game with 5025 runs
- 6000 runs, match 360, for England against West Indies, in April 2007, making 38, and finishing the game with 6019 runs

=== List A Centuries ===
Despite scoring twenty eight half centuries in List A cricket, Nixon managed just one century, and this was for Leicestershire against the Sri Lanka A team. His highest score for the Foxes in domestic cricket is the 96* he made in May 1999 against Kent.

For	Against	Date	Format	Result	Score
Leicestershire	Sri Lanka A	March 1999	50 overs	Lost by 2 runs	101

== Domestic Twenty20 career ==
Nixon shared his thoughts on the T20 game which were as follows, "Wicket-keepers play a very central role as the captain often asks you a lot about the lines people are bowling and the pace of the pitch. Both of these things have an impact on the skipper placing his fielding positions. Therefore the keeper in any team is an integral part of a captain's thought process."

=== 2003 ===
In Leicestershire's first ever Twenty20 Cup match against Yorkshire, which they won by 16 runs, Nixon scored 43 off 26 deliveries, hitting four 6s, and took two catches and a stumping.

After his first game, the next few innings were relatively unsuccessful. 5 runs against Durham was followed by 26 against Lancashire, before 1 off 8 deliveries against Nottinghamshire. Despite this, Leicestershire ran out winners on each occasion. In the next game he scored 27 off 13 balls, including two 4s and two 6s in the 1 run victory over Derbyshire, as the Foxes made their way to the semi-final of the competition.

Warwickshire were the opponents, and despite Brad Hodge scoring 66 with the bat and taking 1–27 with the ball, the Foxes lost by 7 wickets. Nixon hit 7 off 10 deliveries, including a 4, but his team's total of 162 proved inadequate in the end.

=== 2004 ===
A new year and a new competition, and Leicestershire played well to see off Lancashire, before losing to Durham. Next up were Yorkshire and in a high scoring encounter, with both teams notching up over 200, the Foxes won by 10 runs, with Darren Maddy scoring 111 off 60 balls, hitting eight 4s and six 6s. Nixon had hit 3, 0 and 9 in these first three matches, and in the next game against Nottinghamshire scored 23, including a 4 and a 6 to help his team to a 40 run win.

A quarter final win over Essex with a contribution of 3 by Nixon was followed by a semi final clash with Glamorgan. In the encounter, the Foxes won by 21 runs, with Nixon hitting an unbeaten 14. In the final, Leicestershire faced Surrey and won by 7 wickets, with Brad Hodge scoring an unbeaten 77. Nixon was not required to bat on the day, but was now a winner of a Twenty20 Cup medal.

=== 2005 ===
In the first game of the season, Leicestershire played Nottinghamshire first, and won, winning by 5 wickets, with Nixon hitting 32 not out to help win. A loss against Derbyshire followed, although Nixon still contributed 16 and two catches. However, Leicestershire were soon back to winning ways against Durham, triumphing by 3 runs with Nixon hitting 11 off 11 balls. Lancashire ran out winners in the next game, with Nixon being dismissed for a duck.

Scores of 15 not out and 4 followed in the next two wins over Nottinghamshire and Durham, and Nixon was not required to bat in the Leicestershire victory over Yorkshire as his team moved on to the quarter-finals.

In the quarter-final, Middlesex were the opponents, and the Foxes ran out victors by 19 runs, with Nixon hitting an unbeaten 26 off 18 balls. Despite scoring 27 not out in the semi-final against Somerset, it was not enough to win, as Leicestershire bowed out of the competition.

=== 2006 ===
In the first game of the 2006 tournament Nixon scored 14 in the win over Nottinghamshire. This was followed by 21 in the loss to Lancashire. Next an innings of 42 off 25 deliveries, including four 4s and two 6s helped Leicestershire to an 86 run win over Derbyshire, although 13 was not enough to help see off Nottinghamshire in the next match. Derbyshire were next up, and Nixon helped his team to an 18 run win with an unbeaten 25. A score of 11 followed in the win over Durham.

He scored his first half century of the tournament in the next game with 52 off 39 balls, a knock which included four 4s and three 6s, saw his team over the line against Yorkshire and won him the man of the match award. 19 off 12 deliveries in the victory over Durham then lined up a quarter final clash with Kent, where Nixon contributed an unbeaten 17 to help his team to a 9 wicket win.

The semi final of the competition brought another man of the match winning performance from Nixon. Hitting an unbeaten 57 off 33 deliveries, with six 4s and a 6, and taking a catch, he helped his team to a 23 run win over Essex, as Leicestershire made it to the final of the competition for the second time.

Nottinghamshire were the opposition on the day, but the Foxes prevailed, winning by 4 runs, although Nixon was not required to bat.

=== 2007 ===
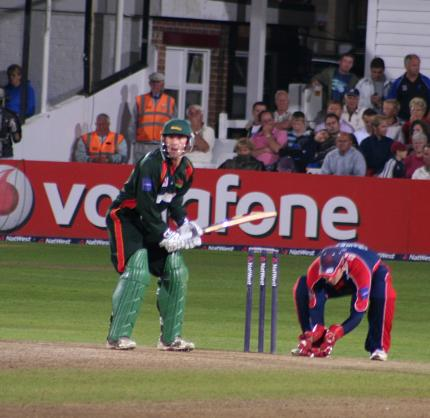
Nixon about to execute a reverse sweep

Leicestershire set out on the road to retain their title in winning fashion, beating Yorkshire by 13 runs. Nixon hit 23 off 18 deliveries. A no result against Nottinghamshire followed. The next opposition were Durham, and in a game reduced to 13 overs per side, the Foxes succumbed to an eight wicket defeat. Nixon hit 16 off 15 balls and took a catch.

In the next game, Nixon then went on to record his highest ever Twenty20 score against Derbyshire. He scored 65 off 41 deliveries, hitting seven 4s and a 6, before being bowled by Graham Wagg, as Leicestershire got back to winning ways with a 6 wicket win. He posted a partnership of 121 with Hylton Deon Ackerman and stumped Greg Smith after the South African had made 79.

Leicestershire then had games against Nottinghamshire, Derbyshire and Durham abandoned and the game against Lancashire ended with no result.

After having five of the first eight group games abandoned, the Foxes' hopes of retaining the trophy were ended.

== International career ==
At the age of 36 he was called into the squad for the 2007 triangular one-day tournament against Australia and New Zealand, as one of two keepers along with Chris Read. His closest opportunity to representing England prior to this came in 2000–01 when he was selected to tour Pakistan and Sri Lanka but did not replace the incumbent Alec Stewart as England's keeper. In July 2007, he was named in the provisional 30-man squad for the inaugural Twenty20 World Championship, to be held in South Africa, fighting for the wicket-keeper spot with Matt Prior. However, when the actual fifteen man squad was announced in August, Matt Prior was chosen as wicket-keeper for the tournament.

=== International Twenty20 Debut ===
He made his international debut in a Twenty20 match against Australia on 9 January 2007, scoring 31 not out – hitting two 4s and a 6 off 22 balls, stumping Mike Hussey and running out Michael Clarke with Paul Collingwood, as England slumped to a 77 run loss.

=== ODI Debut ===
His first one-day call up came three days later, as England took on Australia in the first match of the Commonwealth Bank Series. Despite being dismissed for 0, he caught Adam Gilchrist and Matthew Hayden off the bowling of Jamie Dalrymple and Monty Panesar respectively, but despite this, Ricky Ponting and Michael Clarke each recorded unbeaten half centuries to complete an 8 wicket win for their team.

=== Highest Score ===
Nixon's highest score with the bat came on 30 January 2007, against New Zealand. Nixon and Liam Plunkett set a new record 8th wicket partnership (of 76) for England in One-day Internationals, beating the previous effort held by Ben Hollioake and Darren Gough. He finished with 49, missing out on his half century when he got out to Jacob Oram off the last ball, hitting two 4s and two 6s along the way. Nixon also contributed with the bat in the 1st final against Australia with an unbeaten 11 from 10 balls as England won with 3 balls to spare.

=== Record v. Australia ===
Nixon first played at the start of the Commonwealth Series, starting in January 2007; a competition contested between Australia, New Zealand and England, with all games being played in Australia. The hosts and England made it through to the finals. This meant that of Nixon's first ten One Day International, six were against Australia.

Nixon made an appearance with the bat in each match with a top score of 11 not out. The other five innings brought 0, 9, 4, 4 and 6 runs. This gave him an average of 6.8 against the one-day champions.

However, his keeping and banter from behind the stumps helped England to a series win. He caught eight Australian batsmen off a range of bowling, and helped run out Adam Gilchrist with Liam Plunkett in the third encounter between the two teams.

Nixon was dismissed by Glenn McGrath, with what was the Australian bowler's last ball in cricket at the SCG.

Australia were again the opposition for England in the third match of the Super Eight stage of the 2007 Cricket World Cup. Australia ran out winners by 7 wickets, with Nixon hitting 8.

=== 50+ partnerships ===
In his international career Nixon made four 50 partnerships,

- 30 January 2007 v. New Zealand, partnership of 76 off 9.2 overs, with Liam Plunkett (25*), contributing 42
- 16 March 2007 v. New Zealand, partnership of 71 off 11.4 overs, with Liam Plunkett (29*), contributing 40
- 4 April 2007 v. Sri Lanka, partnership of 87 off 15.2 overs, with Ravi Bopara (52), contributing 42
- 21 April 2007 v. West Indies, partnership of 80 off 10.3 overs, with Kevin Pietersen (100), contributing 18

=== Summer Series 2007 ===
On 26 April 2007, Nixon was named as one of two wicket keepers (along with Matt Prior) in the 25-man performance squad for the summer series against the West Indies and India. Following his performances in the 2007 Cricket World Cup, Nixon was rewarded with a place in the squad, ahead of the two keepers selected for the Ashes series: Geraint Jones and Chris Read. Chairman of selectors, David Graveney, said, "The wicket-keeping position remains a competitive area – Paul Nixon and Matt Prior have been included in the squad but will be aware that they face strong competition from keepers outside of the squad." Inclusion in the squad gave Nixon the chance to extend his England career. Ultimately, Matt Prior was selected as wicket-keeper for the First Test against the West Indies, despite Nixon contributing with the bat during the early stages of the season for Leicestershire.

However, Nixon was selected as wicket-keeper for the England Lions team facing the West Indies before the tourists' one-day series against England. Nixon, along with a number of other players, saw the selection as an opportunity to push for a place in the senior squad. He said, "After the World Cup I thought I might not get another call-up to be honest, especially with the change of management, and Matt Prior has done so well since he came in."

In the end though for Nixon, he was not named in the squad for the series against the West Indies, as Prior kept his position.

== World Cup 2007 ==
=== Group stage ===
In England's first 2007 Cricket World Cup match against New Zealand on 16 March 2007, he again shared a stand with Liam Plunkett – this time of 71 – to boost the total to 209. He ended the innings 42 not out, hitting five 4s having faced 41 balls. This stand turned out to be the best eighth wicket partnership in the whole of the competition. In New Zealand's reply, Nixon caught Lou Vincent off the bowling of James Anderson as the opener was dismissed for 0. Despite being 2–2 at one stage, the Kiwi's eventually won by 6 wickets, with Scott Styris and Jacob Oram both hitting unbeaten half centuries.

On 18 March, England took on Canada and Nixon hit 23 off 8 balls, a knock which included four 4s and a 6 – a strike rate of just under 288. This helped his team accumulate 279. In their innings, Canada were chasing England's total well, when Nixon stumped Asif Mulla who was on 58, off the bowling of Ravi Bopara. A certain amount of momentum was lost as a result, as the Canadians succumbed to a 51 run defeat.

Six days later, England beat Kenya by 7 wickets, although Nixon was not required to bat.

=== Super Eight stage ===
In England's first Super Eight match against Ireland, Nixon contributed a 19 off 15 deliveries, hitting a 4 and a 6 along the way, helping the team's total to 266. Much like Canada in the group stage, Ireland were steadily chipping away at England's total, when Nixon again disrupted momentum with a stumping – this time dismissing Niall O'Brien off Michael Vaughan's bowling, for 63. Ultimately, England won by 48 runs.

On 4 April, England were up against Sri Lanka, and at 133–6, chasing 236 to win. Nixon came to the crease and scored 42 off 44 deliveries, with two 4s and a 6, sharing an 87 run partnership with Ravi Bopara off 15.2 overs, before skying a Lasith Malinga delivery to Mahela Jayawardene. This turned out to be the best seventh wicket partnership of the whole competition. His 6 came in the form of a reverse sweep off the bowling of Muttiah Muralitharan. Nixon remarked after the match, "I've probably hit 20 sixes like that in county cricket – if I get my timing right, it's going to go out of the ground". Bopara was left with the task of hitting 3 runs off the last delivery, but was clean bowled by Dilhara Fernando, as Sri Lanka got a 2 run victory. After this innings, Nixon had a World Cup average of 63 – second highest in the England team to Paul Collingwood, but still better than renowned players Kevin Pietersen and Andrew Flintoff. The figure placed him in the top twenty batsmen – in terms of average – at the World Cup at this stage, ahead of fellow wicket keepers, Brendon McCullum, Adam Gilchrist, Mark Boucher and Kumar Sangakkara.

On 8 April, England faced Australia in the third match of the Super Eight stage of the competition. Electing to bat first, England posted 247, with Kevin Pietersen hitting 104 before hitting a Nathan Bracken delivery, but only succeeding in playing the ball into the hands of Michael Clarke. Nixon came in to bat towards the end of the innings, hit a Glenn McGrath delivery for six, before the bowler got his revenge and had him caught for 8 by Brad Hodge. Nixon's World Cup average dipped to 44.66 after five innings (two unbeaten) and 134 runs. Only Kevin Pietersen, Paul Collingwood, Ian Bell and Ed Joyce had hit more runs at this stage, although all bar Joyce had batted an innings more. Ravi Bopara had also hit over 100 runs at this point, and out of these six players, Nixon was the only one not to have hit at least 50 in a single innings.

England's fourth Super Eight game was against Bangladesh, who had beaten South Africa in their previous match. However, the Tiger's were bowled out for just 143, with Sajid Mahmood and Monty Panesar each taking three wickets. Nixon took two catches, both off the bowling of James Anderson. In the chase, England were at 110–6, with 34 still needed for victory. Nixon, along with Paul Collingwood, chipped away at the total and took England to a four wicket win. Nixon finished on 20 not out, hitting a 4 and a 6 along the way. He faced 39 deliveries, compared to Collingwood's 74, for 23 runs. This partnership of 37 kept their nation's World Cup dream alive. This knock took Nixon's average in the competition to 51.33, bettered in the England team only by Collingwood and Pietersen.

England next faced South Africa in a match akin to a quarter-final for which team was to progress to the semi-finals. England batted first and were 119–6 when Nixon came to the crease, with Ravi Bopara at the other end. After making 1, he was dismissed off the bowling of Andrew Hall, caught by Mark Boucher, as his team was eventually bowled out for 154, with Hall taking 5–18 – the best ever figures for a South African at a World Cup. In South Africa's reply, they were 37–0 off four overs, compared to England's total of 5–0 at the same stage in their innings. England made a breakthrough in the 10th over, as Nixon caught Abraham de Villiers for 42 off the bowling of Andrew Flintoff, but South Africa already had 85 on the board. In the end, the Proteas won by nine wickets, taking just over 19 overs to knock off England's total, with captain Graeme Smith scoring an unbeaten 89 off 58 deliveries, to send England out of the competition.

On the loss against South Africa, and England's exit from the competition, Nixon said:

Colly and Strauss were going well, but we lost the whole middle order quickly. I felt good off the first ball, then just pushed at one second ball and got a feather to the wicketkeeper – just when you want a play and miss, but sadly not. People must remember that we are the second least-experienced side here, only Ireland have fewer caps. For me, I was desperate to win, because I know I will never have another go.

Lastly, England played the West Indies, in what was Brian Lara's last international match. He was run out for 18, but the hosts still went on to compile 300 with Chris Gayle, Devon Smith and Marlon Samuels all hitting half centuries. Nixon took one catch – Ramnaresh Sarwan off the bowling of Liam Plunkett. In reply, England had Michael Vaughan to thank for a good start, reaching 101 before losing a second wicket. However, a mid order collapse followed, as Paul Collingwood, Andrew Flintoff and Jamie Dalrymple all fell in quick succession. Nixon came to the crease with his team 189–6 and 112 runs still needed for victory. Nixon kept his score ticking along, whilst keeping his wicket intact. At the other end, Kevin Pietersen went on to record his second century of the competition, before being bowled by Jerome Taylor. The two had put on 80 together but 31 runs were still required. Liam Plunkett came and went, and with three more runs needed, Nixon himself was bowled by Dwayne Bravo. His 38 (off 39 deliveries, with four 4s) was a contribution which helped bring England to the cusp of victory. Playing in his first match of the competition, Stuart Broad hit the winning runs to secure a morale boosting win for his team.

On the match, Nixon said, "that was an amazing game of cricket. There was some tremendous batting from West Indies. We had to do something, we'd all talked about Duncan Fletcher and it means a lot for him. The lads paced the game so well. Michael Vaughan played beautifully, Kevin Pietersen came in and played magnificently and then the Leicestershire partnership finished it off."

After the match, a CricInfo article read, "the match pivoted round Paul Nixon. By smashing three bottom-handed fours through midwicket in the 48th over he made a seemingly impossible chase do-able."

On the prospect of playing in future competitions for England, Nixon remarked, "I still feel I could do a job at the next World Cup in 2011."

=== Statistics and records ===
England finished fifth in the competition overall, although Nixon had proved one of the team's success stories. He remarked, "fifth at the World Cup is nowhere – but I have loved every minute and let's see what the future holds."

Nixon finished the tournament with an average of 38.6, having scored 193 runs. This was the third highest in the England team, behind Kevin Pietersen and Paul Collingwood. He was the only English batsman to score over 100 runs without hitting over 50 in a single innings.

After facing 194 balls, he had a strike rate of 99.48, hitting seventeen 4s and five 6s. This was the 10th highest strike rate of any player at the World Cup. Of those batsmen that batted more than 3 times in the competition, he ended up with the 6th highest strike rate. He also recorded the fifth highest strike rate of any England player in any innings in the competition, with his 42* off 41 balls against New Zealand – a strike rate of 102.43. Nixon made two more knocks with strike rates over 95, against West Indies and Sri Lanka.

Nixon was involved in four of the highest scoring England partnerships:

- 6th wicket partnership of 51 with Paul Collingwood against Ireland
- 7th wicket partnership of 87 with Ravi Bopara against Sri Lanka
- 8th wicket partnership of 71 with Liam Plunkett against New Zealand
- 9th wicket partnership of 27 with Stuart Broad against West Indies

Nixon had the 34th highest average of all of the players to have taken part – notably one place above Brian Lara. He was the second highest placed wicket keeper – in terms of average – behind Adam Gilchrist who moved ahead of the England man after 149 in the final.

Rank	Name	Played	Runs	Top score	Average	50	100
33	Stephen Fleming	10	353	102*	39.22	3	1
34	Paul Nixon	9	193	42*	38.60	0	0
35	Brian Lara	9	269	77	38.42	1	0

He finished with 9 dismissals – 7 catches and 2 stumpings, which placed him joint fifth in the wicket keeper dismissal rankings.

== Retirement from cricket ==
He announced that he would play his final game of professional cricket at Grace Road against Kent on 6 August 2011 in a T20 quarter final, which meant that should Leicestershire beat Kent and get into finals day he would play. Leicestershire got into finals day, with their highest ever T20 chase of 203 in 20 overs, which they managed in 19.2 overs, with Nixon scoring 31 runs from 17 deliveries. Leicestershire then went on to win the competition; firstly beating Lancashire in a super over eliminator, then beating Somerset by 18 runs in the final, meaning that Nixon got the winning end to his career. His retirement on 27 August 2011 marked the end of his 23-year career, although he played two games for Leicestershire in the qualifying round of the Champions League the following month.
