= Darren Robinson =

Darren Robinson may refer to:

- Darren Robinson (rapper) (1967–1995), founding member of The Fat Boys
- Darren Robinson (cricketer) (born 1973), English cricketer
- Darren Robinson (footballer) (born 2004), Northern Irish footballer
