= Hylton Ackerman =

South African cricketer

Personal information
- Full name: Hylton Michael Ackerman
- Born: 28 April 1947; Springs, Transvaal, South Africa
- Died: 2 September 2009 (aged 62); Cape Town, South Africa
- Batting: Left-handed
- Bowling: Right-arm medium
- Relatives: HD Ackerman (son)

Domestic team information
- Years: Team
- 1963/64–1965/66: Border
- 1966/67–1967/68: North Eastern Transvaal
- 1967–1971: Northants
- 1968/69–1969/70: Natal
- 1970/71–1981/82: Western Province

Career statistics
Competition	First-class	List A
Matches	234	74
Runs scored	12,219	1,975
Batting average	32.49	31.85
100s/50s	20/60	2/13
Top score	208	127
Balls bowled	2,477	162
Wickets	32	5
Bowling average	43.75	24.60
5 wickets in innings	0	0
10 wickets in match	0	0
Best bowling	4/61	3/29
Catches/stumpings	199/–	30/–
- Source: CricInfo, 7 January 2019

Hylton Michael Ackerman (28 April 1947 – 2 September 2009) was a South African first-class cricketer. He attended Dale College Boys' High School, where he was head boy.

A hard-hitting left-hander who usually opened the batting, he made his first-class debut in 1963–64 for Border aged 16 whilst still at school. At 18 he was selected to play for South against North, a trial match for the following season's series against Australia, and scored 84; he twice played for a South African XI against the touring Australians in 1966–67 but was unable to break into the strong Test team. Mediocre form prevented his inclusion in the Test team against Australia in 1969–70. He was selected to tour Australia in 1971–72 but the tour was cancelled owing to anti-apartheid protests. He played in the replacement series, for the World XI, hitting 323 runs at 46.14.

He played four successful seasons for Northamptonshire from 1968 to 1971, scoring over 5,000 runs, and continued playing for Western Province until 1981–82. After he retired he became a coach and a television commentator.

His son, Hylton D. Ackerman, played Test cricket for South Africa in 1998.

Ackerman died in 2009 at Cape Town, aged 62.
