= Brian Bassano =

South African cricket writer (1936–2001)

Brian Sidney Bassano (born in East London, Cape Province, Union of South Africa, on 21 March 1936, died in Launceston, Tasmania, on 10 July 2001) was a South African journalist and cricket historian.

== Life and career ==
Bassano moved from South Africa to the UK in 1961, playing club cricket in England. He returned to South Africa in 1966 and became a journalist and a cricket commentator on SABC radio. With Donald Woods, he formed one of the first multiracial club teams in South Africa, the Rainbow Cricket Club in East London.

Bassano became a prolific historian of South Africa's international cricket up to 1970, and made a 30-part television history of South Africa's Test history from 1888 to 1970 for SABC. He moved to Australia in 1988. Several of his histories were published posthumously.

His son Chris played first-class cricket for Derbyshire and Tasmania.

== Books ==
- South Africa in International Cricket 1888–1970 1979
- The Best of South African Sport: Rob Armitage Benefit Year 1987 (editor)
- The West Indies in Australia 1930-31 (with Rick Smith) 1990
- A Springbok Down Under: South Africa on Tour, 1931-32 (with Rick Smith) 1991 (based on the diary of Ken Viljoen)
- Vic's Boys: Australia in South Africa 1935-36 1993
- South African Cricket: Vol. 4, 1947–1960 1996
- South Africa versus England: 106 Years of Test Match Glory 1996
- MCC in South Africa 1938-39 1997
- Aubrey Faulkner: His Record Innings by Innings 2001
- Mann's Men: MCC in South Africa 1922-23 2004
- The Visit of Mr W. W. Read's 1891-92 English Cricket Team to South Africa (with Rick Smith) 2007
- Maiden Victory: The 1935 South African Tour of England (with Rick Smith) 2012
- South African Test Cricketers 1888-89 – 1969-70 (edited by Rick Smith) 2022
