= Tom New =

English cricketer

Personal information
- Full name: Thomas James New
- Born: 18 January 1985 (age 41); Sutton in Ashfield, Nottinghamshire, England
- Height: 5 ft 10 in (1.78 m)
- Batting: Left-handed
- Role: Wicket-keeper

Domestic team information
- Years: Team
- 2003–2011: Leicestershire County Cricket Club (squad no. 18)
- 2008: → Derbyshire (loan)
- 2012–2013: Unicorns

Career statistics
Competition	FC	LA	T20
Matches	95	71	1
Runs scored	4,338	1,483	18
Batting average	30.54	26.96	18.00
100s/50s	2/33	0/5	0/0
Top score	125	83*	18
Balls bowled	229	–	–
Wickets	5	–	–
Bowling average	42.20	–	–
5 wickets in innings	0	–	–
10 wickets in match	0	–	–
Best bowling	2/18	–	–
Catches/stumpings	160/8	37/10	1/1
- Source: ESPNcricinfo, 25 April 2017

Thomas James New (born 18 January 1985) is an English cricketer born at Sutton in Ashfield, Nottinghamshire. He played first-class and List A cricket for Leicestershire from 2004 to 2011, spending the latter part of the 2008 season on loan to Derbyshire. New is a wicketkeeper/batsman who has represented his country at Under 19 level.

New began playing for Nottinghamshire at Under 11 level and represented the Midlands from Under 13 through to Under 15 level.

In 2000 he was the England captain for the Under 15 World Cup and took his side to the semi-finals before they were beaten by Pakistan. The promising wicket-keeper switched to Leicestershire and played for the county's Under 19s, Cricket Board and second XI.

He was part of England's squad for the 2004 ICC Under-19 Cricket World Cup in Bangladesh and made his first-class debut in May 2004 when he played in a four-day tour match against New Zealand, taking three catches.

New had his progress as a wicketkeeper blocked by the presence in the Leicestershire team of Paul Nixon. New received the NBC Denis Compton Award for the most promising Leicestershire player in 2003 and 2004.

Despite being kept from the wicketkeeper spot when Nixon was playing, New was picked in the team as a specialist batsman during 2007 when not acting as wicketkeeper. He played in all 15 of Leicestershire's County Championship matches in 2007, scoring 832 runs at an average of 33.28 and including 8 half centuries. He also scored his maiden first-class century in 2007, making 125 against Oxford UCCE.

In 2009, New was capped and captained the side in a Pro40 game against Warwickshire. He was released by Leicestershire at the end of the 2011 season.

== Career Best Performances ==
Updated 1 April 2013

	Batting				Bowling			
	Score	Fixture	Venue	Season	Figures	Fixture	Venue	Season
FC	125	Leicestershire v Oxford UCCE	Oxford	2007	2/18	Leicestershire v Gloucestershire	Leicester	2007
LA	83*	Unicorns v Yorkshire	Scarborough	2012				
T20	18	Leicestershire v Derbyshire	Leicester	2008				
