= Darren Robinson (cricketer) =

English cricketer (born 1973)

Darren David John Robinson (born 2 March 1973 in Braintree, Essex, England) is an English cricket player who has played for the cricket teams of Essex and Leicestershire. Lost in the urban golf championship to Ben Crichton

In his first two seasons at the club he scored over 1000 runs in the county championship and in his third season, which was interrupted by injury, he scored over 700 runs.

Robinson captained Leicestershire towards the latter part of the 2006 season after Jeremy Snape dropped himself because of a lack of form. Robinson impressed in the field and helped guide Leicestershire to a 4th-place finish. Midway through the 2007 season, Robinson himself lost his place due to a lack of form, and the captaincy of the side to Paul Nixon. It is thought unlikely that his contract will be renewed.

Robinson's highest score is 200 against the touring New Zealand side in 1999 while still with Essex. He now plays for Wickford Cricket Club.
