= Paul Havell =

Australian-born English cricketer (born 1980)

Personal information
- Full name: Paul Matthew Roger Havell
- Born: 4 July 1980 (age 46); Melbourne, Victoria, Australia
- Nickname: Trigger
- Height: 6 ft 3 in (1.91 m)
- Batting: Left-handed
- Bowling: Right-arm fast-medium
- Role: Bowler

Domestic team information
- Years: Team
- 2001: Sussex
- 2003–2005: Derbyshire
- FC debut: 16 May 2001 Sussex v Cambridge University
- Last FC: 4 August 2005 Derbyshire v Somerset
- LA debut: 27 August 2001 Sussex v Derbyshire
- Last LA: 30 May 2005 Derbyshire v Derbyshire

Career statistics
Competition	FC	LA	T20
Matches	16	6	1
Runs scored	52	8	–
Batting average	8.66	2.66	–
100s/50s	0/0	0/0	–
Top score	13*	4	–
Balls bowled	2,242	137	24
Wickets	41	3	2
Bowling average	41.78	38.66	16.00
5 wickets in innings	0	0	0
10 wickets in match	0	0	0
Best bowling	4/75	3/28	2/32
Catches/stumpings	4/–	0/–	0/0–
- Source: CricketArchive, 26 April 2012

Paul Matthew Roger Havell (born 4 July 1980) is an Australian-born English cricketer. He is a left-handed batsman and a right-arm fast-medium bowler.

Havell began playing for Sussex in the Second XI Championship in 1999. He made his first-class cricket debut in 2001 for Sussex. He signed for Derbyshire in 2003, playing his first match for his new club in a first-class fixture against a South African touring side in August 2003. A promising first-class debut saw him claim 4 wickets in the first innings. Havell appeared in 3 County Championship games that season.

Havell appeared in 16 first-class matches, taking 41 wickets at an average of 41.78 with a County Championship best figures of 4–75 against Durham at the Riverside in 2004.
