= Nathan Dumelow =

English cricketer (born 1981)

Nathan Robert Charles Dumelow (born 30 April 1981) is an English cricketer who played for Derbyshire from 2001 to 2004.

Dumelow was born in Derby, England. He began playing for the Derbyshire Cricket Board in 1999 and made his first-class debut for Derbyshire in the 2001 season. Upon his baptism in first-class cricket, he made an immediate impact, taking on his debut the wickets of Yousuf Youhana and Inzamam-ul-Haq. With his chances at Derbyshire limited by the presence of other spinners at the club, he was released from his contract in its final year at the beginning of 2005.

Since 2005, Dumelow has played for Cheshire in the Minor Counties Championship, in 2007 he was the Championship's leading wicket-taker with 39 at 19.76. He is a right-handed batsman and a right-arm offbreak bowler.
