= 2007 World Twenty20 =

Inaugural edition of the ICC Men's T20 World Cup

2007 ICC World Twenty20
- Dates: 11 September 2007 – 24 September 2007
- Administrator: International Cricket Council
- Cricket format: Twenty20 International
- Tournament format(s): Group stage and Knockout
- Host: South Africa
- Champions: India (1st title)
- Runners-up: Pakistan
- Participants: 12 (from 16 entrants)
- Matches: 27
- Attendance: 516,488 (19,129 per match)
- Player of the series: (Pakistan) Shahid Afridi
- Most runs: (Australia) Matthew Hayden (265)
- Most wickets: (Pakistan) Umar Gul (13)
- Official website: www.icc-cricket.com

The 2007 ICC World Twenty20 was the inaugural edition of the Men's T20 World Cup, formerly known as the ICC World Twenty20 that was contested in South Africa from 11 to 24 September 2007. Twelve teams took part in the thirteen-day tournament—the ten Test-playing nations and the finalists of the 2007 World Cricket League Division One tournament: Kenya and Scotland. India won the tournament, beating Pakistan in the final at Johannesburg by 5 runs.

== Rules and regulations ==
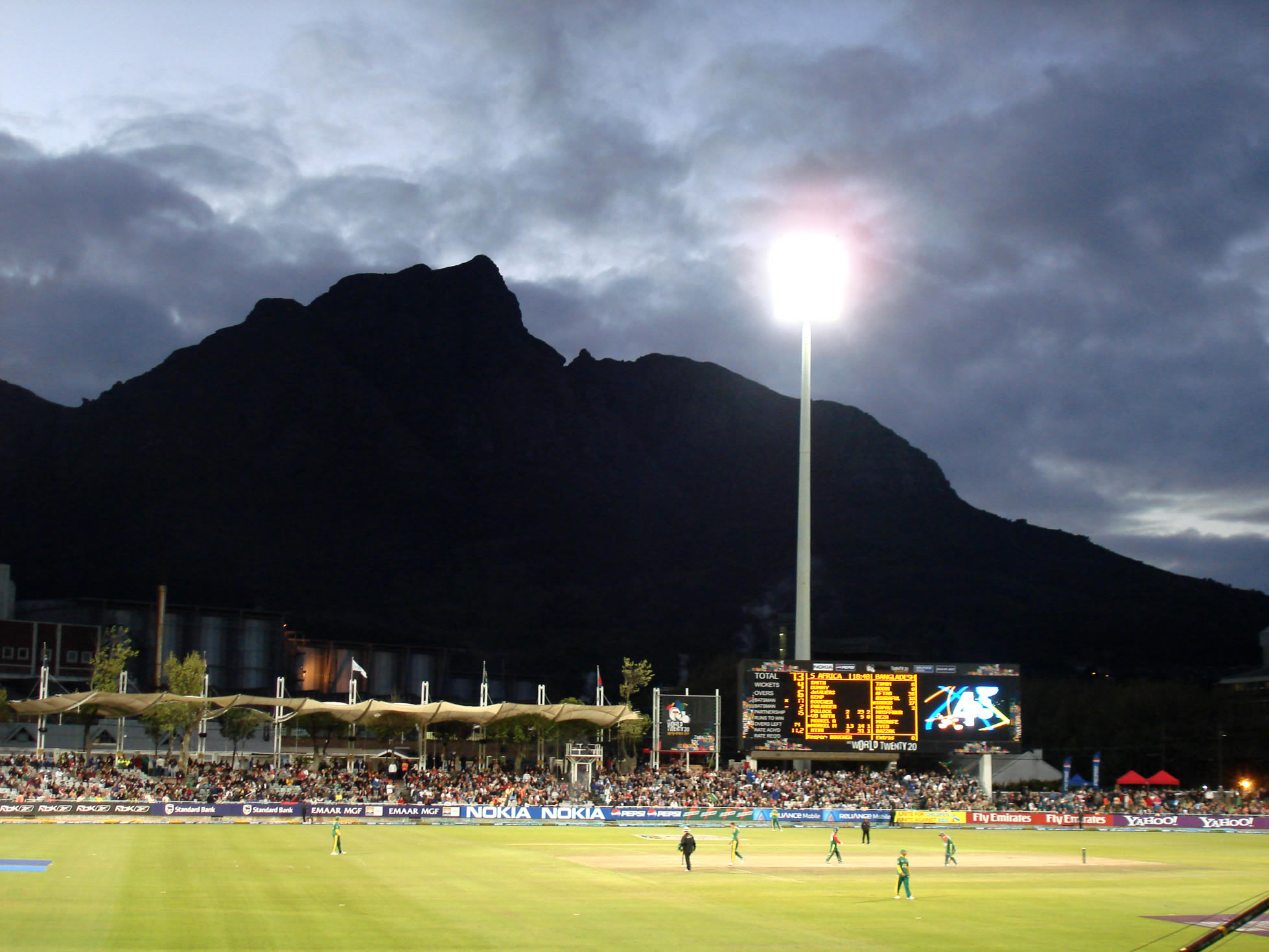
ICC World T20 2007 BAN vs RSA

During the group stage and Super Eight, points were awarded to the teams as follows:

Results	Points
Win	2 points
No result	1 point
Loss	0 points

In case of a tie (i.e., both teams score exactly the same number of runs at the end of their respective innings), a bowl-out decided the winner. This was applicable in all stages of the tournament. The bowl-out was used to determine the result of only one game in this tournament – the Group D game between India and Pakistan on 14 September (scorecard).

Within each group (both group stage and Super Eight stage), teams were ranked against each other based on the following criteria:

1. Higher number of points
2. If equal, higher number of wins
3. If still equal, higher net run rate
4. If still equal, lower bowling strike rate
5. If still equal, result of head-to-head meeting.

== Qualification ==
Teams from every ICC Region :

Africa (3)
- Kenya
- South Africa (host nation)
- Zimbabwe
Americas (1)
- West Indies
Asia (4)
- Bangladesh
- India
- Pakistan
- Sri Lanka
East Asia-Pacific (2)
- Australia
- New Zealand
Europe (2)
- England
- Scotland

By finishing first and second in the 2007 WCL Division One, Kenya and Scotland qualified for the World Twenty20.

== Venues ==
All matches were played at the following three grounds:

Cape Town	Durban	Johannesburg
Newlands Cricket Ground	Kingsmead	Wanderers Stadium
Capacity: 22,000	Capacity: 25,000	Capacity: 34,000
2007 World Twenty20 is located in South Africa

== Groups ==
Group A

- South Africa
- Bangladesh
- West Indies

Group B

- Australia
- England
- Zimbabwe

Group C

- Sri Lanka
- New Zealand
- Kenya

Group D

- India
- Pakistan
- Scotland

== Match officials ==
=== Umpires ===
Five umpires from the Elite Panel of ICC Umpires, along with four members of the ICC International umpire panel completed the list of umpires for the 27 match tournament. A rotation system saw all officials serve on-field, as well as in third umpire capacities.

Umpire	Panel
(England) Mark Benson	Elite
(Cricket West Indies) Billy Doctrove	Elite
(Australia) Daryl Harper	Elite
(Pakistan) Asad Rauf	Elite
(Australia) Simon Taufel	Elite
(Australia) Steve Davis	International
(New Zealand) Tony Hill	International
(South Africa) Ian Howell	International
(England) Nigel Llong	International

Three South African officials—Marais Erasmus, Karl Hurter, and Brian Jerling—served as fourth umpires for all group stage matches.

=== Referees ===
The three match referees selected were members of the Panel of ICC Referees, and were responsible for all 27 matches.

Referee
(England) Chris Broad
(Sri Lanka) Ranjan Madugalle
(South Africa) Mike Procter

== Group stage ==
The 12 participant teams were divided into four groups of three teams each. The groups were determined based on the rankings of the teams in Twenty20 as of 1 March 2007. The top two teams from each group went through to the second stage of the tournament.

A warm-up match was played between South Africa and Pakistan on 6 September 2007 in which South Africa defeated Pakistan by 25 runs.

All times given are South African Standard Time (UTC+02:00)

=== Group A ===
Pos	Seed	Team	Pld	W	L	NR	Pts	NRR
1	A1	South Africa	2	2	0	0	4	0.974
2	A3	Bangladesh	2	1	1	0	2	0.149
3	A2	West Indies	2	0	2	0	0	−1.233

Source: ESPNCricinfo

Group A saw the only exit of a seeded team when the West Indies were eliminated after losing both their matches. Their first loss came after Chris Gayle's record 117 runs was not enough to prevent South Africa from winning and Bangladesh also winning against West Indies.

11 September
18:00
(scorecard)

West Indies; 205/6 (20 overs)	v	South Africa; 208/2 (17.4 overs)
Chris Gayle 117 (57); Johan van der Wath 2/33 (4 overs)		Herschelle Gibbs 90* (55); Fidel Edwards 1/21 (3 overs)

South Africa won by 8 wickets
Wanderers Stadium, Johannesburg
Umpires: Mark Benson (Eng) and Daryl Harper (Aus)
Player of the match: Chris Gayle (WI)

- South Africa won the toss and elected to field.
- Vernon Philander, Morne Morkel (both SA) and Ramnaresh Sarwan, Fidel Edwards (both WI) all made their T20I debuts.
- Chris Gayle became the first person to hit a century in an official Twenty20 International. He also scored the most sixes in one innings of Twenty20 with 10.
- The West Indian first-wicket partnership of 145 between Chris Gayle and Devon Smith was the highest in Twenty20 international cricket.
- The West Indies beat their own record of giving away the most extras in a Twenty20 match, with 28 (4 leg-byes, 23 wides and a no-ball).

13 September
10:00
(scorecard)

West Indies; 164/8 (20 overs)	v	Bangladesh; 165/4 (18 overs)
Devon Smith 51 (52); Shakib Al Hasan 4/34 (4 overs)		Aftab Ahmed 62 (49); Ramnaresh Sarwan 2/10 (2 overs)

Bangladesh won by 6 wickets
Wanderers Stadium, Johannesburg
Umpires: Mark Benson (Eng) and Nigel Llong (Eng)
Player of the match: Mohammad Ashraful (Ban)

- Bangladesh won the toss and elected to field.
- South Africa and Bangladesh qualified for the Super 8s as a result of this match.

15 September
18:00
(scorecard)

Bangladesh; 144 (19.3 overs)	v	South Africa; 146/3 (18.5 overs)
Aftab Ahmed 36 (14); Shaun Pollock 3/40 (3.3 overs)		Albie Morkel 41 (29); Abdur Razzak 2/26 (4 overs)

South Africa won by 7 wickets
Newlands Cricket Ground, Cape Town
Umpires: Asad Rauf (Pak) and Tony Hill (NZ)
Player of the match: Morne Morkel (SA)

- South Africa won the toss and elected to field.

=== Group B ===
Pos	Seed	Team	Pld	W	L	NR	Pts	NRR
1	B1	Australia	2	1	1	0	2	0.987
2	B2	England	2	1	1	0	2	0.209
3	B3	Zimbabwe	2	1	1	0	2	−1.196

Source: ESPNCricinfo

Group B started with World Champions Australia being defeated by Zimbabwe, Brendan Taylor scored 60 (not out) and saw the Africans home with one ball to spare.

12 September
18:00
(scorecard)

Australia; 138/9 (20 overs)	v	Zimbabwe; 139/5 (19.5 overs)
Brad Hodge 35 (22); Elton Chigumbura 3/20 (3 overs)		Brendan Taylor 60* (45); Stuart Clark 2/22 (4 overs)

Zimbabwe won by 5 wickets
Newlands Cricket Ground, Cape Town
Umpires: Asad Rauf (Pak) and Tony Hill (NZ)
Player of the match: Brendan Taylor (Zim)

- Australia won the toss and elected to bat.
- Tatenda Taibu, Vusi Sibanda, Tawanda Mupariwa (Zim), Brad Hodge and Mitchell Johnson (both Aus) all made their T20I debuts.

13 September
14:00
(scorecard)

England; 188/9 (20 overs)	v	Zimbabwe; 138/7 (20 overs)
Kevin Pietersen 79 (37); Elton Chigumbura 4/31 (4 overs)		Brendan Taylor 47 (39); Dimitri Mascarenhas 3/18 (4 overs)

England won by 50 runs
Newlands Cricket Ground, Cape Town
Umpires: Asad Rauf (Pak) and Ian Howell (SA)
Player of the match: Kevin Pietersen (Eng)

- England won the toss and elected to bat.
- Luke Wright, Darren Maddy and Chris Schofield (Eng) all made their T20I debuts.

14 September
14:00
(scorecard)

England; 135 (20 overs)	v	Australia; 136/2 (14.5 overs)
Andrew Flintoff 31 (19); Nathan Bracken 3/16 (4 overs)		Matthew Hayden 67* (43); Andrew Flintoff 1/25 (4 overs)

Australia won by 8 wickets
Newlands Cricket Ground, Cape Town
Umpires: Asad Rauf (Pak) and Ian Howell (SA)
Player of the match: Nathan Bracken (Aus)

- England won the toss and elected to bat.
- Australia and England qualified for the Super 8s as a result of this match.

=== Group C ===
Pos	Seed	Team	Pld	W	L	NR	Pts	NRR
1	C2	Sri Lanka	2	2	0	0	4	4.721
2	C1	New Zealand	2	1	1	0	2	2.396
3	C3	Kenya	2	0	2	0	0	−8.047

Source: ESPNCricinfo

In the first match Kenya scored the lowest Twenty20 International total of 73 against New Zealand and went on to lose with 12.2 overs and 9 wickets to spare. Kenya's fate was sealed when they allowed Sri Lanka to post a Twenty20 world record of 260 in the group's second match. Kenya were then bowled out for 88 and lost by a record 172 runs.

12 September
10:00
(scorecard)

Kenya; 73 (16.5 overs)	v	New Zealand; 74/1 (7.4 overs)
Collins Obuya 18 (25); Mark Gillespie 4/7 (2.5 overs)		Lou Vincent 27 (20); Thomas Odoyo 1/22 (3 overs)

New Zealand won by 9 wickets
Kingsmead, Durban
Umpires: Billy Doctrove (WI) and Simon Taufel (Aus)
Player of the match: Mark Gillespie (NZ)

- New Zealand won the toss and elected to field.
- Nehemiah Odhiambo, Maurice Ouma (Ken) and Chris Martin, Daniel Vettori (NZ) all made their T20I debuts.
- Kenya's score of 73 all out was the lowest ever score in a Twenty20 International.

14 September
10:00
(scorecard)

Sri Lanka; 260/6 (20 overs)	v	Kenya; 88 (19.3 overs)
Sanath Jayasuriya 88 (44); Jimmy Kamande 3/48 (4 overs)		Alex Obanda 21 (25); Tillakaratne Dilshan 2/4 (1.3 overs)

Sri Lanka won by 172 runs
Wanderers Stadium, Johannesburg
Umpires: Daryl Harper (Aus) and Nigel Llong (Eng)
Player of the match: Sanath Jayasuriya (SL)

- Kenya won the toss and elected to field.
- Jehan Mubarak and Gayan Wijekoon (both SL) made their T20I debuts.
- Sri Lanka's score of 260 for six was the highest recorded in any top-level Twenty20 match. They also recorded the largest margin of victory in Twenty20 Internationals.
- Sri Lanka and New Zealand qualified for the Super 8s as a result of this match.

15 September
14:00
(scorecard)

New Zealand; 164/7 (20 overs)	v	Sri Lanka; 168/3 (18.5 overs)
Ross Taylor 62 (42); Dilhara Fernando 2/31 (4 overs)		Sanath Jayasuriya 61 (44); Daniel Vettori 2/23 (4 overs)

Sri Lanka won by 7 wickets
Wanderers Stadium, Johannesburg
Umpires: Mark Benson (Eng) Daryl Harper (Aus)
Player of the match: Sanath Jayasuriya (SL)

- New Zealand won the toss and elected to bat.

=== Group D ===
Pos	Seed	Team	Pld	W	L	NR	Pts	NRR
1	D2	India	2	1	0	1	3	0.000
2	D1	Pakistan	2	1	1	0	2	1.275
3	D3	Scotland	2	0	1	1	1	−2.550

Source: ESPNCricinfo

India and Pakistan played in the first ever World Twenty20 bowl-out. India's bowlers defeated Pakistan 3–0.

12 September
14:00
(scorecard)

Pakistan; 171/9 (20 overs)	v	Scotland; 120 (19.5 overs)
Younis Khan 41 (29); Craig Wright 3/29 (4 overs)		Fraser Watts 46 (35); Shahid Afridi 4/19 (4 overs)

Pakistan won by 51 runs
Kingsmead, Durban
Umpires: Steve Davis (Aus) and Simon Taufel (Aus)
Player of the match: Shahid Afridi (Pak)

- Scotland won the toss and elected to field.
- This was Scotland's inaugural T20I match.
- Fraser Watts, Ryan Watson, Navdeep Poonia, Gavin Hamilton, Neil McCallum, Dougie Brown, Colin Smith, Majid Haq, Craig Wright, John Blain, Dewald Nel (Sco) all made their T20I debuts.

13 September
18:00
(scorecard)

India	v	Scotland

No Result
Kingsmead, Durban
Umpires: Steve Davis (Aus) and Simon Taufel (Aus)

- Scotland won the toss and elected to field.
- No play was possible due to rain.
- Points were shared. As a result of this match, Pakistan qualified for the Super 8s.

14 September
18:00
(scorecard)

India; 141/9 (20 overs)	v	Pakistan; 141/7 (20 overs)
Robin Uthappa 50 (39); Mohammad Asif 4/18 (4 overs)		Misbah-ul-Haq 53 (35); Irfan Pathan 2/20 (4 overs)

Scores tied, India won 3-0 via bowl-out. (Ind X X X, Pak O O O)
Kingsmead, Durban
Umpires: Billy Doctrove (WI) and Simon Taufel (Aus)
Player of the match: Mohammad Asif (Pak)

- Pakistan won the toss and elected to field.
- Sohail Tanvir (Pak) made his T20I debut.
- After the scores were tied, the winner of the match was decided via a bowl out. India won the bowl out and qualified for the Super 8s.

== Super 8s ==
This tournament's Super Eight format was designed such that the top 2 seeds from each group was pre-decided at the start of the tournament. The actual performance of the team in the Group Stage played no role in determining if the team qualified into Super Eight Group E or F. For example, in Group C, though Sri Lanka finished with more points than New Zealand, for the purpose of the Super Eight groupings, New Zealand retained the group's top seed position (C1) while Sri Lanka retained the group's second seed position (C2).

In case a third-seeded team qualified ahead of the two top-seeded teams, it took on the seed of the eliminated team. This only happened in Group A, where Bangladesh (original seed A3) qualified ahead of West Indies (original seed A2) and therefore took on the A2 spot in Group F. The other seven top seeds qualified.

The eight teams were divided into two groups of four teams each. The two top teams from each Super Eight group qualified for the semi-finals.

Teams
Australia
Bangladesh
England
India
New Zealand
Pakistan
South Africa
Sri Lanka

=== Group E ===
Pos	Team	Pld	W	L	NR	Pts	NRR
1	India	3	2	1	0	4	0.750
2	New Zealand	3	2	1	0	4	0.050
3	South Africa	3	2	1	0	4	−0.116
4	England	3	0	3	0	0	−0.700

Source: ESPNCricinfo

16 September
10:00
(scorecard)

New Zealand; 190 (20 overs)	v	India; 180/9 (20 overs)
Brendon McCullum 45 (31); Harbhajan Singh 2/24 (4 overs)		Gautam Gambhir 51 (33); Daniel Vettori 4/20 (4 overs)

New Zealand won by 10 runs
Wanderers Stadium, Johannesburg
Umpires: Mark Benson (Eng) and Nigel Llong (Eng)
Player of the match: Daniel Vettori (NZ)

- India won the toss and elected to field.

16 September
18:00
(scorecard)

South Africa; 154/8 (20 overs)	v	England; 135/7 (20 overs)
Albie Morkel 43 (20); Stuart Broad 3/37 (4 overs)		Owais Shah 36 (31); Albie Morkel 2/12 (2 overs)

South Africa won by 19 runs
Newlands Cricket Ground, Cape Town
Umpires: Asad Rauf (Pak) and Tony Hill (NZ)
Player of the match: Albie Morkel (SA)

- England won the toss and elected to field.
- Jeremy Snape (Eng) made his T20 debut.

18 September
10:00
(scorecard)

New Zealand; 164/9 (20 overs)	v	England; 159/8 (20 overs)
Craig McMillan 57 (31); James Anderson 2/24 (4 overs)		Darren Maddy 50 (31); Shane Bond 2/20 (4 overs)

New Zealand won by 5 runs
Kingsmead, Durban
Umpires: Billy Doctrove (WI) and Simon Taufel (Aus)
Player of the match: Craig McMillan (NZ)

- England won the toss and elected to field.

19 September
14:00
(scorecard)

New Zealand; 153/8 (20 overs)	v	South Africa; 158/4 (19.1 overs)
Craig McMillan 48 (25); Morné Morkel 4/16 (4 overs)		Justin Kemp 89* (56); Mark Gillespie 2/11 (3.1 overs)

South Africa won by 6 wickets
Kingsmead, Durban
Umpires: Billy Doctrove (WI) and Simon Taufel (Aus)
Player of the match: Justin Kemp (SA)

- South Africa won the toss and elected to field.
- Nathan McCullum (NZ) made his T20I debut.
- England were eliminated as a result of this match.

19 September
18:00
(scorecard)

India; 218/4 (20 overs)	v	England; 200/6 (20 overs)
Virender Sehwag 68 (52); Chris Tremlett 2/45 (4 overs)		Vikram Solanki 43 (31); Irfan Pathan 3/37 (4 overs)

India won by 18 runs
Kingsmead, Durban
Umpires: Billy Doctrove (WI) and Simon Taufel (Aus)
Player of the match: Yuvraj Singh (Ind)

- India won the toss and elected to bat.
- Rohit Sharma, Joginder Sharma (Ind) and Chris Tremlett (Eng) made their T20I debuts.
- Yuvraj Singh scored the fastest fifty in a Twenty20 International from just 12 deliveries faced (previous best was 20 balls by Mohammed Ashraful in the same tournament) and also became the fourth cricketer in all official forms of cricket and the first in Twenty20 to hit 6 sixes in an over. Stuart Broad was the bowler.
- This was the highest score against a Test team during the tournament.

20 September
18:00
(scorecard)

India; 153/5 (20 overs)	v	South Africa; 116/9 (20 overs)
Rohit Sharma 50 (40); Shaun Pollock 2/17 (4 overs)		Albie Morkel 36 (37); R. P. Singh 4/13 (4 overs)

India won by 37 runs
Kingsmead, Durban
Umpires: Billy Doctrove (WI) and Simon Taufel (Aus)
Player of the match: Rohit Sharma (Ind)

- India won the toss and elected to bat.
- After three teams finished on equal points, New Zealand and India advanced to the semi-finals by having higher net run rates. The hosts, South Africa, were eliminated as a result of this match.
- South Africa needed 126 runs while chasing to qualify for semi final but they failed and were eliminated.

=== Group F ===
Pos	Team	Pld	W	L	NR	Pts	NRR
1	Pakistan	3	3	0	0	6	0.843
2	Australia	3	2	1	0	4	2.256
3	Sri Lanka	3	1	2	0	2	−0.697
4	Bangladesh	3	0	3	0	0	−2.031

Source: ESPNCricinfo

16 September
14:00
(scorecard)

Bangladesh; 123/8 (20 overs)	v	Australia; 124/1 (13.5 overs)
Tamim Iqbal 32 (40); Brett Lee 3/27 (4 overs)		Matthew Hayden 73* (48)

Australia won by 9 wickets
Newlands Cricket Ground, Cape Town
Umpires: Asad Rauf (Pak) and Ian Howell (SA)
Player of the match: Brett Lee (Aus)

- Australia won the toss and elected to field.
- Brett Lee took the first ever hat-trick in a T20I match.

17 September
18:00
(scorecard)

Pakistan; 189/6 (20 overs)	v	Sri Lanka; 156/9 (20 overs)
Shoaib Malik 57 (31); Lasith Malinga 3/43 (4 overs)		Chamara Silva 38 (27); Shahid Afridi 3/18 (4 overs)

Pakistan won by 33 runs
Wanderers Stadium, Johannesburg
Umpires: Daryl Harper (Aus) and Nigel Llong (Eng)
Player of the match: Younis Khan (Pak)

- Sri Lanka won the toss and elected to field.

18 September
14:00
(scorecard)

Australia; 164/7 (20 overs)	v	Pakistan; 165/4 (19.1 overs)
Michael Hussey 37 (25); Sohail Tanvir 3/31 (4 overs)		Misbah-ul-Haq 66* (42); Stuart Clark 3/27 (4 overs)

Pakistan won by 6 wickets
Wanderers Stadium, Johannesburg
Umpires: Mark Benson (Eng) and Nigel Llong (Eng)
Player of the match: Misbah-ul-Haq (Pak)

- Pakistan won the toss and elected to field.

18 September
18:00
(scorecard)

Sri Lanka; 147/5 (20 overs)	v	Bangladesh; 83 (15.5 overs)
Jehan Mubarak 31* (19); Mahmudullah 1/19 (4 overs)		Aftab Ahmed 18 (11); Sanath Jayasuriya 2/4 (1.5 overs)

Sri Lanka won by 64 runs
Wanderers Stadium, Johannesburg
Umpires: Mark Benson (Eng) and Daryl Harper (Aus)
Player of the match: Dilhara Fernando (SL)

- Bangladesh won the toss and elected to field.
- Pakistan qualified for the semi-finals as a result of this match.
- Bangladesh were eliminated from the tournament.

20 September
10:00
(scorecard)

Sri Lanka; 101 (19.3 overs)	v	Australia; 102/0 (10.2 overs)
Jehan Mubarak 28 (26); Stuart Clark 4/20 (4 overs)		Matthew Hayden 58* (38)

Australia won by 10 wickets
Newlands Cricket Ground, Cape Town
Umpires: Asad Rauf (Pak) and Ian Howell (SA)
Player of the match: Stuart Clark (Aus)

- Australia won the toss and elected to field.
- Australia qualified for the semi-finals as a result of this match.
- Sri Lanka was eliminated from the tournament.
- This was the first time a team chased a total in the tournament with all 10 wickets intact, making it the biggest margin of victory in terms of wickets.

20 September
14:00
(scorecard)

Bangladesh; 140 (19.4 overs)	v	Pakistan; 141/6 (19 overs)
Junaid Siddique 71 (49); Shoaib Malik 2/15 (2 overs)		Shahid Afridi 39 (15); Abdur Razzak 2/16 (4 overs)

Pakistan won by 4 wickets
Newlands Cricket Ground, Cape Town
Umpires: Ian Howell (SA) and Tony Hill (NZ)
Player of the match: Junaid Siddique (Ban)

- Pakistan won the toss and elected to field.
- Junaid Siddique (Ban) made his T20 debut.

== Knockout stage ==
Semi-finals
22 September – Newlands Cricket Ground, Cape Town
New Zealand	143/8 (20 ov)
Pakistan	147/4 (18.5 ov)
22 September – Kingsmead, Durban
India	188/5 (20 ov)
Australia	173/7 (20 ov)

Final
24 September – Wanderers Stadium, Johannesburg
India	157/5 (20 ov)
Pakistan	152 (19.3 ov)

=== Semi-finals ===
22 September
13:00
Scorecard

New Zealand; 143/8 (20 overs)	v	Pakistan; 147/4 (18.5 overs)
Ross Taylor 37* (23); Umar Gul 3/15 (4 overs)		Imran Nazir 59 (41); Scott Styris 1/14 (3 overs)

Pakistan won by 6 wickets
Newlands Cricket Ground, Cape Town
Attendance: 18,734
Umpires: Daryl Harper (Aus) and Simon Taufel (Aus)
Player of the match: Umar Gul (Pak)

- New Zealand won the toss and elected to bat.

22 September
18:00
Scorecard

India; 188/5 (20 overs)	v	Australia; 173/7 (20 overs)
Yuvraj Singh 70 (30); Mitchell Johnson 2/31 (4 overs)		Matthew Hayden 62 (47); S. Sreesanth 2/12 (4 overs)

India won by 15 runs
Kingsmead, Durban
Umpires: Mark Benson (Eng) and Asad Rauf (Pak)
Player of the match: Yuvraj Singh (Ind)

- India won the toss and elected to bat.

=== Final ===
24 September 2007
14:00
Scorecard

India; 157/5 (20 overs)	v	Pakistan; 152 (19.3 overs)
Gautam Gambhir 75 (54); Umar Gul 3/28 (4 overs)		Misbah-ul-Haq 43 (38); Irfan Pathan 3/16 (4 overs)

India won by 5 runs
Wanderers Stadium, Johannesburg
Attendance: 32,217
Umpires: Mark Benson (Eng) and Simon Taufel (Aus)
Player of the match: Irfan Pathan (Ind)

- India won the toss and elected to bat.
- Yusuf Pathan (Ind) made his T20I debut.

India won the toss and chose to bat on what was considered to be a traditionally batsman-friendly pitch at the Bullring. Umar Gul took the wickets of both Yuvraj Singh and Mahendra Singh Dhoni, leaving India with 157/5 in 20 overs; only Gautam Gambhir (75 from 54 balls) produced a notable innings. A 21-run over from Sreesanth swung the game towards Pakistan. However, Irfan Pathan (3/16), RP Singh (3/26) and Joginder Sharma (2/20) slowed the scoring dramatically. With Pakistan needing 54 from 24 balls, Misbah-ul-Haq hit 3 sixes off Harbhajan Singh in one over. Sreesanth was also dispatched for 2 sixes but took the wicket of Sohail Tanvir, as Pakistan went into the last over needing 13 runs to win, with only 1 wicket remaining. Joginder Sharma bowled a wide first ball, followed by a dot ball. Misbah followed by taking six off a full-toss; Pakistan needed just 6 runs to win from the last four balls. Misbah attempted to hit the next ball with a paddle-scoop over fine leg, but he only managed to sky the ball, and it was caught at short fine-leg by Sreesanth, leaving Pakistan all out for 152 runs. Irfan Pathan was awarded the Man of the Match for his spell, which included 3 wickets for 16 runs.

== Statistics ==
The leading run-scorer in the tournament was Matthew Hayden, with 265 runs, and the highest wicket-taker Umar Gul with 13 wickets. The top-five in each category are:

=== Most runs ===
Player	Matches	Innings	Runs	Average	SR	HS	100	50	4s	6s
(Australia) Matthew Hayden	6	6	265	81.33	144.80	73*	0	4	32	10
(India) Gautam Gambhir	7	6	227	37.83	129.71	75	0	3	27	5
(Pakistan) Misbah-ul-Haq	7	7	218	54.50	139.74	66*	0	2	18	9
(Pakistan) Shoaib Malik	7	7	195	39.00	126.62	57	0	2	15	5
(England) Kevin Pietersen	5	5	178	35.6	161.81	79	0	1	17	6
Source: Cricinfo

=== Most wickets ===
Player	Matches	Innings	Wickets	Overs	Econ.	Ave.	BBI	S/R	4WI	5WI
(Pakistan) Umar Gul	7	7	13	27.4	5.60	11.92	4/25	12.7	1	0
(Australia) Stuart Clark	6	6	12	24	6.00	12.00	4/20	12.0	1	0
(India) RP Singh	7	6	12	24	6.33	12.66	4/13	12.0	1	0
(Pakistan) Shahid Afridi	7	7	12	28	6.71	15.66	4/19	14.0	1	0
(New Zealand) Daniel Vettori	6	6	11	24	5.33	11.63	4/20	13.0	1	0
Source: Cricinfo

== Media coverage ==
Coverage of the 2007 ICC World Twenty20 was as follows:

Television networks

- Africa — Supersport (Live)
- Australia — Fox Sports (Live)
- Australia — Nine Network
- Bangladesh — Bangladesh Television(In group stage 2 Bangladesh match only) (Live)
- Canada — Asian Television Network (Live)
- Caribbean – Caribbean Media Corporation (Live)
- India — ESPN (Live) – English
- India — STAR Cricket (Live) – Hindi
- Jamaica – Television Jamaica (Live)
- Middle East – Ten Sports (Live)
- New Zealand — SKY Network Television (Live)
- Pakistan — GEO Super (Live)
- Pakistan – Pakistan Television Corporation (Live)
- Sri Lanka — Sirasa Network (Live)
- United Kingdom — Sky Sports (Live)
- United States — DirecTV CricketTicket (Live)

Radio Networks

- Africa – All Jazz Radio
- Australia – Australian live radio
- Bangladesh – DhakaFM
- Canada – CBC radio one
- Caribbean; Radio airplay
- India – All India Radio
- Jamaica – Radio Jamaica Limited
- Middle East – Top Fm radio
- New Zealand – Radio pacific
- Pakistan – Radio Pakistan
- Sri Lanka – Radio Sri Lanka, Sinhala Radio Service
- United Kingdom – BBC Radio 5 Live
- United States – WHTZ-FM – Z-100
