= John Maunders =

English cricketer

Personal information
- Full name: John Kenneth Maunders
- Born: 4 April 1981 (age 45); Ashford, Surrey, England
- Batting: Left-handed
- Bowling: Right-arm medium

Domestic team information
- Years: Team
- 1999–2001: Middlesex
- 2003–2007: Leicestershire
- 2008–2010: Essex
- 2008: Shropshire

Career statistics
Competition	FC	LA	T20
Matches	90	36	19
Runs scored	4,689	748	73
Batting average	30.05	24.93	10.42
100s/50s	8/23	1/2	0/0
Top score	180	109*	25*
Balls bowled	1,525	139	12
Wickets	24	4	2
Bowling average	38.66	25.75	7.00
5 wickets in innings	0	0	0
10 wickets in match	0	0	0
Best bowling	4/15	2/16	2/14
Catches/stumpings	56/–	9/–	5/–
- Source: CricInfo, 27 January 2025

John Kenneth Maunders (born 4 April 1981) is an English former professional cricketer.

Maunders was born at Ashford in Surrey in 1981 and initially played his cricket for Ashford Cricket Club where he was a key member of the colts side.

== Career ==
Maunders played first-class cricket as an opening batsman, scoring 5 centuries and bowled occasional medium pace yielding 24 wickets.

His career started with Middlesex where he was given limited first team opportunity but performed well at second team level and represented England in U19 Test cricket, participating in the U19 World Cup in India.

Without a regular place in the full Middlesex side John moved to Leicestershire where he became a regular in the Championship side during the 2005 season. He scored a total of 3,544 runs for Leicestershire in 124 innings with 3 Not Outs, at an average of 29.28, which included 5 hundreds and 18 fifties. His 24 wickets were taken at an average of 38.66, with an economy rate of 3.65, and best figures of 4 for 15. He also holds the record for the highest innings in the Leicester 2nd XI for whom he scored 228 not out, declaring as captain to provide his opponents with an achievable target. Despite such promise, he was one of six cricketers to be released by Leicestershire in October 2007.

He was quickly recruited by Essex making his debut against Northants and scored 62 and 26. His contract was extended by a further 12 months after strong performances in the County Championship and the NatWest Pro40.

He is now the proprietor of Maunders Cricket, based at Sunbury Cricket Club, providing specialist cricket coaching to young and adult players.
