= Dominic Hewson =

English cricketer

Dominic Robert Hewson (born 3 October 1974) was an English cricketer who played for Gloucestershire and Derbyshire during an eight-year first-class career.

Hewson began his career as an opening batsman, and made his debut in County cricket debut for Gloucestershire in August 1996 against Hampshire. He soon became a one-day cricket specialist, after some expert bowling coaching and practice. The arrival of Craig Spearman in the side did nothing to hoist Hewson's confidence or, more importantly, appearances for Gloucestershire.

Hewson joined Derbyshire in 2002. In his debut performance for Derbyshire, he scored a duck in his first innings, followed by a century in his second, where he finished not out with 102. His first-class career, however, was very much undermined by a heart condition from which he regularly suffered, which landed him in hospital after a National League match in July 2003. Having played only two matches during calendar year 2004, he was released by his team. He was a right-handed batsman and a right-arm medium-pace bowler
