= Neil Gunter =

English cricketer

Neil Edward Lloyd Gunter (born 12 May 1981 (age 45)) is a former English cricketer who played for Derbyshire from 2002 to 2004. He is a left-handed batsman and a right-arm fast-medium bowler.

Gunter was born at Basingstoke, Hampshire. He played initially for Berkshire and joined Derbyshire in the 2002 season. He appeared in seven first-class matches taking 17 wickets at an average of 35.41. Gunter was released from his duties in 2004. He returned to Berkshire in 2005.
