= Darren Maddy =

English cricketer (born 1974)

Personal information
- Full name: Darren Lee Maddy
- Born: 23 May 1974 (age 52); Leicester, England
- Batting: Right-handed
- Bowling: Right-arm medium
- Role: All-rounder

International information
- National side: England (1998–2007)
- Test debut (cap 597): 19 August 1999 v New Zealand
- Last Test: 18 January 2000 v South Africa
- ODI debut (cap 150): 21 May 1998 v South Africa
- Last ODI: 20 February 2000 v Zimbabwe
- T20I debut (cap 30): 13 September 2007 v Zimbabwe
- Last T20I: 19 September 2007 v India

Domestic team information
- Years: Team
- 1993–2006: Leicestershire
- 2007–2013: Warwickshire (squad no. 43)
- 2007/08: Kolkata Tigers

Career statistics
Competition	Test	ODI	FC	LA
Matches	3	8	282	360
Runs scored	46	113	13,644	9,009
Batting average	11.50	18.83	32.02	30.74
100s/50s	0/0	0/1	27/62	11/52
Top score	24	53	229*	167*
Balls bowled	84	0	15,378	7,331
Wickets	0	–	252	219
Bowling average	–	–	31.34	28.84
5 wickets in innings	–	–	5	0
10 wickets in match	–	–	0	0
Best bowling	–	–	5/37	4/16
Catches/stumpings	4/–	1/–	289/–	142/–
- Source: ESPNcricinfo, 6 June 2013

Darren Lee Maddy (born 23 May 1974) is an English former professional cricketer who played for Leicestershire and Warwickshire County Cricket Clubs and for the England cricket team. Maddy made three Test match, eight One Day International (ODI) and four Twenty20 International (T20I) appearances for England and played domestic county cricket for 20 years.

Maddy was born at Leicester in 1974 and educated at Wreake Valley College.

== Domestic career ==
Maddy left school to join Leicestershire aged 17 and made his senior debut for the county towards the end of the 1993 English cricket season in a one-day match against Derbyshire at Grace Road. He made his first-class cricket debut the following season and played regularly for Leicestershire between 1995 and 2006. He was awarded his county cap in 1996 and won the County Championship with the side in 1996 and 1998 and the Twenty20 Cup in 2004 and 2006. After being awarded a benefit season by Leicestershire in 2006 he left the club at the end of the season to join Warwickshire.

After just one game for Warwickshire he became captain of the team following Heath Streak's resignation, captaining the side until the end of the 2008 season. He led Warwickshire to the County Championship Division Two title in 2008 and won the County Championship with the side in 2012 as well as the Yorkshire Bank 40 in 2010. He played for the county until the end of the 2013 season, announcing his retirement from cricket part way through the season.

Maddy scored over 13,000 runs and took more than 250 wickets in first-class county matches during his domestic career as well as scoring over 9,000 runs and taking over 220 wickets in one-day county cricket. He was the first player to score 1,000 runs in Twenty20 cricket. After retirement he became a teacher at Solihull School.

== International career ==
Maddy played three Test matches and eight ODIs for England between 1998 and 2000. He made his international debut in an ODI against South Africa at The Oval in May 1998 and his Test debut on the same ground against New Zealand in August 1999. His Test and ODI career was described as "brief and not especially successful" and although he scored a half-century in his final ODI against Zimbabwe in early 2000, Wisden was of the opinion that he had "failed to make the impact hoped".

After not being considered for international duty for seven years, Maddy was selected for England's squad for the 2007 ICC World Twenty20, the country's selectors opting to select a team of T20 specialists. He played four matches during the tournament, scoring a half-century and taking three wickets, his only international wickets.

== Coaching career ==
In May 2022, Maddy was named as the coach of the Croatia national cricket team, ahead of their ICC Men's T20 World Cup Europe Qualifier matches in Finland in July 2022. From 2013 to 2026 Maddy held a coaching role at Solihull School as Master in charge of Cricket.
