= Jeremy Snape =

English cricketer (born 1973)

Personal information
- Full name: Jeremy Nicholas Snape
- Born: 27 April 1973 (age 53); Stoke-on-Trent, Staffordshire, England
- Nickname: Snapey
- Height: 5 ft 8 in (1.73 m)
- Batting: Right-handed
- Bowling: Right arm off spin
- Role: All-rounder

International information
- National side: England (2001–2007)
- ODI debut (cap 167): 3 October 2001 v Zimbabwe
- Last ODI: 18 September 2002 v Zimbabwe
- ODI shirt no.: 17
- Only T20I (cap 34): 16 September 2007 v South Africa
- T20I shirt no.: 29

Domestic team information
- Years: Team
- 1992–1997: Northamptonshire
- 1999–2002: Gloucestershire
- 2003–2008: Leicestershire

Career statistics
Competition	ODI	T20I	FC	LA
Matches	10	1	121	272
Runs scored	118	7	4,194	3,737
Batting average	29.50	7.00	28.14	23.21
100s/50s	0/0	0/0	3/23	1/13
Top score	38	7	131	104*
Balls bowled	529	6	10,728	8,393
Wickets	13	0	113	222
Bowling average	31.00	–	49.40	29.30
5 wickets in innings	0	–	1	1
10 wickets in match	0	–	0	0
Best bowling	3/43	–	5/65	5/32
Catches/stumpings	5/–	1/–	74/–	95/–
- Source: CricketArchive, 11 September 2017

Jeremy Nicholas Snape (born 27 April 1973) is a former English cricketer, who played limited over internationals, and a sports psychologist. He was a right-handed batsman and bowled right-arm off-break. He was the T20 captain for Leicestershire.

Snape holds a master's degree in sports psychology and has worked with a number of teams in cricket, football, and rugby union.

== Cricket ==
=== Domestic career ===
Snape started his cricket career in 1991 at Northamptonshire, which was soon interrupted by higher education. During this time he was a student at Durham University, graduating in 1994. Upon returning to county cricket, the rest of his years with Northamptonshire produced no further trophies, and he decided on a move to Gloucestershire for the beginning of the 1999 season. There he was a part of the treble-winning side of 2000 and double winning side of 2001.

Snape signed for Leicestershire from the 2003 season. He was part of the Leicestershire side that won the Twenty20 Cup in August 2004. After hardly playing in Leicestershire's 1st XI in 2005, he was appointed captain for 2006 when HD Ackerman stood down. He had more success in Twenty 20 cricket where he guided Leicestershire to their second Twenty20 cup win in three years.

In June 2008, Snape announced his retirement from county cricket, to concentrate on his outside interests in performance psychology. He made his last appearance on 24 June in a Twenty20 match against Nottinghamshire. Fittingly, he contributed to the 5 run victory - scoring an unbeaten 11 and taking 1-10 off two overs. Snape was rewarded with a testimonial year in 2008 in which he supported Operation Smile and the PCA Benevolent Fund.

=== International career ===
Snape made his ODI debut against Zimbabwe in 2001-02 and won the Man of the Match award in his first game: he played a further nine ODIs for England over the next year

During the 2007 Cricket World Cup, while attached to the England squad as a psychologist, he was fined for not preventing inappropriate behaviour from English players.

In August 2007, Snape was recalled to the England squad for the 2007 Twenty20 World Championship.

== Sports psychology ==
After completing a master's degree in Sports Psychology, Snape founded Sporting Edge in 2005 which solves Business Challenges using the Winning Mindset from Sport.

In 2013 Snape joined the LMA as a Non-Executive Director to support the football managers' leadership and management programmes at St George's Park.

Snape's podcast 'Inside the Mind of Champions' features his interviews with elite performers and is a regular in the Apple Podcast Chart top 10 for Management
