= Chris Bassano =

South African-born cricketer (born 1975)

Personal information
- Full name: Christopher Warwick Godfrey Bassano
- Born: 11 September 1975 (age 51); East London, Cape Province, South Africa
- Batting: Right-handed
- Bowling: Right-arm leg spin
- Role: Batsman
- Relatives: Brian Bassano (father)

Domestic team information
- Years: Team
- 2001 to 2005: Derbyshire
- 2002–03: Tasmania

Career statistics
Competition	FC	LA	T20
Matches	59	68	9
Runs scored	3172	1729	119
Batting average	34.04	29.30	17.00
100s/50s	5/20	5/7	0/0
Top score	186	126	43
Balls bowled	12	0	0
Wickets	0	–	–
Bowling average	–	–	–
5 wickets in innings	0	–	–
10 wickets in match	0	–	–
Best bowling	–	–	–
Catches/stumpings	34/–	13/–	3/–
- Source: Cricinfo, 27 March 2007

Christopher Warwick Godfrey Bassano (born 11 September 1975) is a South African-born cricketer and fly-fisher who lives in Tasmania. His father Brian was a South African sports journalist who wrote several books of cricket history.

As a resident of Tasmania, and yet a British national, Bassano qualified to play county cricket as an overseas player. On his County Championship debut in 2001 for Derbyshire he hit 186 not out and 106 against Gloucestershire. After finishing with a career-best average during the 2004 season, his form fell away in 2005 and he was released. He played a few Minor Counties matches for Cheshire in 2007.

Bassano lives in Tasmania, where he conducts fly fishing tours. He has represented Australia at fly fishing at Commonwealth and world championship level. He has also worked for Tasmania's Inland Fisheries Service on conservation and stocking programs. He designs and markets fishing flies.
