= HD Ackerman =

South African cricketer

Personal information
- Full name: Hylton Deon Ackerman
- Born: 14 February 1973 (age 53); Cape Town, South Africa
- Nickname: HD
- Height: 5 ft 11 in (1.80 m)
- Batting: Right-handed
- Bowling: Right arm medium
- Relatives: Hylton Ackerman (father)

International information
- National side: South Africa
- Test debut (cap 268): 26 February 1998 v Pakistan
- Last Test: 30 March 1998 v Sri Lanka

Domestic team information
- Years: Team
- 1993/94–2002/03: Western Province
- 2003/04: Gauteng
- 2003/04–2004/05: Lions
- 2005–2009: Leicestershire
- 2005/06: Cape Cobras
- 2006/07–2007/08: Warriors
- 2008/09–2009/10: Dolphins
- 2009/10: KwaZulu Natal

Career statistics
Competition	Test	FC	LA	T20
Matches	4	220	226	55
Runs scored	161	14,625	6,327	1,811
Batting average	20.12	43.65	32.61	37.72
100s/50s	0/1	40/75	4/41	0/17
Top score	57	309*	139	87
Balls bowled	0	102	48	0
Wickets	–	0	0	–
Bowling average	–	–	–	–
5 wickets in innings	–	–	–	–
10 wickets in match	–	–	–	–
Best bowling	–	–	–	–
Catches/stumpings	1/–	183/–	82/–	13/–
- Source: Cricinfo, 2 October 2009

Hylton Deon Ackerman, also known as HD Ackerman, (born 14 February 1973) is a South African cricket commentator, coach, and former cricketer. He commentates for Supersport. He is currently also the head coach of the First XI and director at Guildford Grammar School in Perth, Western Australia.

Ackerman has four Test appearances for South Africa all made in 1998. He made a gutsy 57 in his first Test innings but after that made little impact. It was thought that Ackerman had a weakness against top class spin as Mushtaq Ahmed and Muttiah Muralitharan were particularly successful against him in successive series.

He joined Leicestershire in 2005 under the Kolpak ruling which allowed him to play for an English county without being registered as an overseas player. He was the captain of Leicestershire in 2005, having some success in one-day cricket.

In the 2006 season, Ackerman stepped down to concentrate on his batting. This move seems to have paid off as Ackerman scored 309 not out against Glamorgan at Sophia Gardens, the highest ever first-class score by a Leicestershire player.

Ackerman's father, Hylton Michael Ackerman, played first-class cricket for Border, Natal, Northern Transvaal and Western Province in South Africa, and for Northamptonshire in England. He was picked for the World XI that played Australia in 1971–72, but did not play Test cricket because of South Africa's exclusion from international cricket on account of apartheid.
