= Hampshire County Cricket Club in 2005 =

2005 season of an English cricket team

Hampshire Hawks
2005 season
- Captain: Shane Warne
- Ground(s): Rose Bowl, Southampton

Hampshire County Cricket Club played their cricket in Division One of both the County Championship and the National League in 2005. They started the season at 10–1 odds to win the Championship. With the first eleven including seven players who had represented their country at Test or ODIs at the end of the season, they nearly won the County Championship, beating eventual County Champions Nottinghamshire both home and away, and ended with the same win–loss record as Notts. However, with two bonus points less and half a point deducted due to a slow over rate against Sussex in July, they finished behind – something that had been apparent the week before the Championship ended. They did win the C&G Trophy, defeating three League Division Two sides and a minor county on the way to the title, in addition to Glamorgan from Division One, but their other limited-overs forays ended in relegation (in the League) and elimination due to head-to-head results in the Twenty20 Cup.

Hampshire played 16 first class games in 2005, winning nine, drawing four and losing three. They also played 22 List A games, winning ten, losing ten and abandoning two, while eight Twenty20 games ended in three wins, two losses, two no results and one abandoned match.

== Players ==
- Simon Katich
- James Adams
- Chris Benham
- Michael Brown
- James Bruce
- Tom Burrows
- John Crawley
- Sean Ervine
- David Griffiths
- Derek Kenway
- Greg Lamb
- Kevin Latouf
- Richard Logan
- Dimitri Mascarenhas
- Jono McLean
- Alan Mullally
- Kevin Pietersen
- Nic Pothas
- Lawrence Prittipaul
- Billy Taylor
- James Tomlinson
- Chris Tremlett
- Shaun Udal
- Alan Mullally

== Tables ==
=== Championship ===
2005 County Championship – Division One
Pos	Team	Pld	W	D	L	Pen	BP	Pts
1	Nottinghamshire	16	9	4	3	0	94	236
2	Hampshire	16	9	4	3	0.5	92	233.5
3	Sussex	16	7	6	3	0	102	224
4	Warwickshire	16	8	3	5	0.5	86	209.5
5	Kent	16	6	7	3	8.5	99	202.5
6	Middlesex	16	4	7	5	0.5	98	181.5
7	Surrey	16	4	9	3	8.5	97	180.5
8	Gloucestershire	16	1	5	10	2	72	104
9	Glamorgan	16	1	1	14	0	71	88.5

=== totesport League ===
2005 totesport League – Division One
Pos	Team	Pld	W	L	NR	Pts
1	Essex Eagles	16	13	1	2	56
2	Middlesex Crusaders	16	10	5	1	42
3	Northamptonshire Steelbacks	16	7	7	2	32
4	Glamorgan Dragons	16	6	6	4	32
5	Nottinghamshire Outlaws	16	6	7	3	30
6	Lancashire Lightning	16	6	9	1	26
7	Gloucestershire Gladiators	16	6	9	1	26
8	Worcestershire Royals	16	5	10	1	22
9	Hampshire Hawks	16	5	10	1	22

=== Twenty20 Cup Group Stage (South) ===
2005 Twenty20 Cup – South Division
Team	M	W	L	NR	Pts	NRR
Surrey Lions	8	5	3	0	10	+0.64
Middlesex Crusaders	8	4	3	1	9	+0.16
Sussex Sharks	8	3	2	3	9	+0.13
Hampshire Hawks	8	3	2	3	9	+0.20
Essex Eagles	8	3	3	2	8	−0.06
Kent Spitfires	8	1	6	1	3	−1.02

== Match details ==
=== April ===
The first game in the Championship was a narrow 48 run victory against Gloucestershire. This was followed by a rain-affected defeat against Essex in the Sunday League. The second Championship game was a close draw against Sussex – the sort of game where Championships are won. However, surprisingly, with 29 needed off 34 balls with 2 wickets remaining, captain Shane Warne put up shop, securing the 4 points, but giving up the opportunity of 14. They then easily defeated the students of Cardiff UCCE.

==== County Championship: Hampshire v Gloucestershire (13–16 April) ====
Hampshire (17pts) beat Gloucestershire (4pts) by 48 runs

Hampshire won the toss and elected to bat. There were 1,200 at the Rose Bowl to watch Simon Katich flawless 72 not out, as he was the only one able to cope with the conditions as Hampshire were all out for 197 before tea. Katich's innings was one of defence coupled with the odd drive, hook and pull. Hampshire's meagre total suggests they miss Kevin Pietersen, who performed so well for England in the one-dayers against Zimbabwe and South Africa over the winter. Pietersen said of his foot injury, "If I got a ball on my foot or I slipped I could be out for six to eight weeks. It's a bit tender and it's just a case of biding my time", he said. However, they did have to face good, fast-medium-pace bowling from Gloucestershire. Gloucestershire fared well in reply, and Shane Warne brought himself into the attack after only 18 overs. He took Craig Spearman's wicket when Spearman tried to sweep him, but Gloucestershire were sitting pretty at close on 118 for 2, 79 behind with 8 first innings wickets remaining.

On the second day, Hampshire's bowlers, led by Warne, battled hard to get them back into the game. Except for Jon Lewis, who scored 40 off 61 balls batting at number ten, no-one after the first three Gloucester batsmen scored more than ten. Their first innings ended for 221, just 24 ahead. Hampshire also struggled, and scored only 94 for their first 6 wickets. Warne and Sean Ervine survived the last six overs to push the score to 111 for 6 at close.

The third day saw yet another change in fortunes, which just about left Hampshire on top. The bowlers dominated the first two days, but the start of the third day was dominated by Hampshire's bowlers batting. Warne increased his score to 62, Chris Tremlett got 64 and Richard Logan 28 through aggressive batting as Hampshire closed their second innings on 275. This left Gloucestershire a challenging target of 252. Spearman and Phil Weston then put on 129 for the first wicket, only for five wickets to fall in quick succession before bad light stopped play, with the visitors on 149 for 5, needing 103 for victory.

It took only 18.4 overs on the fourth day for the match to be settled. With Billy Taylor finishing on 6 for 45 as Gloucester were all out for 203. After the game Hampshire's captain, Shane Warne, said, "We believe we can win from any position and it's so important to win your first few games. It was a tremendous team effort and everyone pulled their weight. This is the type of game you never forget. We found ourselves behind the eight ball at the start of every day but I always felt we were in with a chance if we could remove their openers." Cricinfo scorecard

==== National League: Hampshire v Essex (17 April) ====
Essex (4pts) beat Hampshire (0pts) by 16 runs (D/L method)

At the Rose Bowl, Hampshire Hawks batted first, scoring 175 for 9, as Tim Phillips took 3 for 31. It was a good day for spin, with Grant Flower also taking 2 wickets. In reply, Essex Eagles' Will Jefferson was 44 not out, and Essex 69 for 2 off 16 overs when rain put an end to play, leaving Essex the winners on the Duckworth–Lewis method. England's star one-day player of the winter, Kevin Pietersen, managed only 5 off 14 balls for Hampshire before being bowled. (BBC scorecard)

==== County Championship: Sussex v Hampshire (20–23 April) ====
Sussex (9pts) drew with Hampshire (9pts)

Hampshire finished the first day on top at Hove. Sussex, despite a century from Michael Yardy, were all out for 252, with Chris Tremlett taking 6 for 44. In reply, the visitors reached 67 for 1. Only for the position to be reversed on the second day, as they were dismissed for 280, with James Kirtley claiming 4 and Robin Martin-Jenkins 3 wickets. Sussex finished on 101 for 2.

The game remained evenly poised on the third day, but with Sussex slightly in the lead, with rain predicted for the fourth. Sussex took their score on to 312, thereby setting a target of 285. Hampshire were on 89 for 3 at the end of day three. With rain predicted on the fourth day, the game could have gone any one of four ways. Kevin Pietersen (61), assisted by Sean Ervine (57), took the challenge to Sussex – and the game was always in the balance. When the eighth wicket fell, the score was on 256 for 8. And with 29 required off 34 balls, the game looked set for one of those exciting finishes that only the longer form of the game can provide. Disappointingly for the crowd, Hampshire captain Shane Warne ordered his batsmen to shut up shop. Sussex were unable to take the final two wickets, and on 267 for 8, the game was drawn. Hampshire finished the day second behind Warwickshire, but the ten points given up here had crucial repercussions later on in the season. (Cricinfo scorecard)

==== MCC University Match: Hampshire v Cardiff UCCE (27–29 April) ====
Hampshire beat Cardiff UCCE by 95 runs

On the first, rain-affected day Hampshire progressed to 299 for 4 off 76 overs, with Michael Brown putting on 93 at the Rose Bowl. On day 2, Hampshire declared on their overnight score and bowled out Cardiff UCCE. Cardiff UCCE's Christopher Salmons scored 84 not out, an innings that included six fours and five sixes, which made up nearly half of the students' total of 169. Hampshire were 80 for 3, 210 runs ahead, at close. On the third and final day Hampshire declared on 146 for 6, setting a target of 277. Wickets fell at regular intervals, and there was just enough time for Cardiff UCCE to be bowled out for a second time for 181. (BBC scorecard)

=== May ===
On the Sunday after, however, they were thrashed by the Northamptonshire Steelbacks. The next day, they lost heavily to the Gloucestershire Gladiators. On 4 May Hampshire eased past Shropshire to progress to Round Two of the C&G Trophy. They then drew over 4 days against Kent, missing their chance of going top of the table by 1 wicket. Their first win in the Sunday League came on 15 May, beating Middlesex at Lord's, and they carried their good one-day form into the midweek, beating Glamorgan by six wickets. They then won a rain-affected match against the same team by nine wickets in the Championship, before going down to Warwickshire by ten wickets inside two days. This meant they finished May second in the Championship table.

==== National League: Northamptonshire v Hampshire (1 May) ====
Northamptonshire (4pts) beat Hampshire (0pts) by 98 runs

At Northampton, Northamptonshire Steelbacks' Bilal Shafayat struck a career-best 74 from 82 balls as Northants stormed to 266 for 9. Shafayat was dropped on 11 and 56, but congratulated by Hampshire captain, Shane Warne, who was taken for 53 in nine overs. Hampshire fell to 44 for 4 in reply and, despite 42 from Shaun Udal batting number eight, were never in the game as the Hawks were all out for 168. Northamptonshire seamer Ben Phillips took his second List A four-wicket-haul, removing Kevin Pietersen, John Crawley, Warne and Chris Tremlett on his way to four for 48. (BBC scorecard)

==== National League: Hampshire v Gloucestershire (2 May) ====
Gloucestershire (4pts) beat Hampshire (0pts) by 60 runs

Jon Lewis won the game for Gloucestershire Gladiators with 40 runs off 28 balls with the bat, and then taking out the Hampshire Hawks top order by taking 5 for 19 with the ball. Lewis had come in as a pinch hitter at number four after Matt Windows retired hurt. It was the Gladiators won the toss at the Rose Bowl, Southampton and, thanks to Lewis and 63 from Phil Weston, they scored 210 for 9. Hampshire's innings was stopped by Lewis, and despite a 55-run partnership between John Crawley and Nic Pothas, it was never enough, and they finished on 150 all out. (BBC scorecard)

==== C&G Trophy Round One: Shropshire v Hampshire (4 May) ====
Hampshire beat Shropshire by 7 wickets to progress to Round Two of the C&G Trophy

Shropshire batted first at Whitchurch, making only 132 as Shane Warne and Richard Logan took 3 wickets each. This was never a big enough target to hold off Hampshire. The crowd were treated to a powerful innings by England's new star one-day performer, Kevin Pietersen, who had been promoted to No. 1 in the batting order. He scored 76 off 49 balls in an innings that included six sixes and seven fours as Hampshire racked up 133 for 3 off 21.1 overs. (Cricinfo scorecard)

==== County Championship: Hampshire v Middlesex (6–9 May) ====
Hampshire (19pts) beat Middlesex (5pts) by 64 runs

Hampshire won a closely fought match at the Rose Bowl by 64 runs despite the efforts with the ball by New Zealand and Middlesex all-rounder Scott Styris, who took his first ten-wicket haul of his career on a pitch that quickly deteriorated and in Styris' own words was "junk". With former England wicket-keeper John Crawley starring in the first innings, making a controlled 84 before being ninth out to Alan Richardson. There were disappointments for England fans, though, who had hoped that Kevin Pietersen would find some form – instead, he was out for a 10-ball duck in the first innings. Hampshire made 275 in their first innings, Alan Richardson and Scott Styris taking four wickets each.

Middlesex' reply would have been a sorry one but for a big partnership between Owais Shah (83) and Irish left-hander Ed Joyce (70), who continued his great form in the Championship, passing 400 runs in his third match of the season. The pair were the only ones who passed 35, but their fourth-wicket partnership of 166 was the highest in the match. However, leg spinner Shane Warne got the better of both of them in the end, as Joyce gave a return catch and Shah was stumped off the bowling of the Australian. With Hampshire losing two quick wickets to be 28 for 2 at the close, the match hung in the balance, with nightwatchman Billy Taylor on 0 and Australian batsman Simon Katich on 1.

Billy Taylor, however, played a special knock. Lasting 116 balls, he scored only 9 runs, but his stamina proved invaluable. He forged good partnerships with Katich and Crawley, giving Hampshire a good platform to hit loose from. Wicketkeeper Nic Pothas was top-scorer with 65, but Zimbabwe all-rounder Sean Ervine (30) and Dimitri Mascarenhas (44) also chipped in to lift Hampshire to 304. A spirited reply from Middlesex was always tampered by the Hampshire bowlers chipping away at their line-up patiently, and despite 52 from former Kent batsman Ed Smith, Middlesex were defeated as Chris Tremlett ripped out the tail, ending with four for 59 – just outperformed by Warne, who took four for 58. (Cricinfo scorecard)

==== County Championship: Kent v Hampshire (11–14 May) ====
Kent (10pts) drew with Hampshire (10pts)

Hampshire put on 328 in only 73.3 overs on the first day at Canterbury, helped greatly by a maiden 72-ball first-class century by Shane Warne, who came in with the score on 130 for 7. First class debutant wicket-keeper Tim Burrows scored 42, sharing a 131-run stand with Warne. In reply, Kent were 135 for 3 at stumps, with David Fulton scoring a half-century.

On the second day, Kent were all out for 305, Hampshire making 191 for 2 in reply, putting them firmly in the box seat. The day's honours went to Simon Katich, who was on 125 at close, and with Kevin Pietersen also scoring a century on day three, Hampshire were able to declare on 461 for 9, setting a mammoth target of 485. Kent were 121 for 2 in reply when time was called.

The fourth and final day saw Kent pull off a draw after they attempted to win. When the eighth wicket fell at 370, the tailenders looked for the draw, which they achieved as Kent reached their highest-ever fourth innings total of 447 for 9. Kent's innings featured 77 from Martin van Jaarsveld as six other batsmen scored more than 35. (Cricinfo scorecard)

==== National League: Middlesex v Hampshire (15 May) ====
Hampshire (4pts) beat Middlesex (0pts) by 105 runs

Seldom has a captain regretted his decision as much as Ben Hutton of Middlesex Crusaders must have done when he chose to field on a flat Lord's against Hampshire Hawks. Before the match, Middlesex were top of the table, Hampshire rock bottom. It didn't show. Kevin Pietersen played a typical knock, scoring 80 off 50 balls with six sixes, while Dimitri Mascarenhas got himself a 26-ball fifty as Hampshire amassed 353 for 8 off 45 overs – a run rate of 7.84. Despite Owais Shah's 89, Middlesex were never in it, and crumbled to 248 all out in just 39 overs – Pietersen bowling the last over, conceding a single off the first ball before bowling four dot balls to Paul Hutchison and having him caught by captain Shane Warne on the last ball – meaning that Pietersen now had figures of 1–0–1–1 in one-day cricket. It turned out to be his only List A over all season. (Cricinfo scorecard)

==== C&G Trophy Round Two: Glamorgan v Hampshire (17 May) ====
Hampshire beat Glamorgan by six wickets to progress to the Quarter-Finals of the C & G Trophy

Zimbabwean all-rounder Sean Ervine and veteran wicket-keeper Nic Pothas made the most important contributions as Hampshire overpowered Glamorgan at Cardiff. Only Mike Powell showed some sort of resistance, scoring 56 in Glamorgan's 214, while Ervine took five for 50 from his ten overs – admittedly mostly tail-enders, but he got the most wickets. Chris Tremlett also took three for 32. Pothas then notched up the first limited-over century of the Hampshire season, scoring 114 not out off 127 balls and standing tall while Glamorgan's fast bowlers Andrew Davies and Simon Jones made inroads with the ball. England prospect Kevin Pietersen continued his fine form with 69 off 64 balls, including four sixes, as he shared a 130-run partnership with Pothas. Thanks to the quick scoring of Pothas and Pietersen, Hampshire won with nearly 11 overs to spare. (Cricinfo scorecard)

==== County Championship: Hampshire v Glamorgan (20–23 May) ====
Hampshire (22pts) beat Glamorgan (3pts) by nine wickets

Amid rains at Southampton, Hampshire batted their way to the big lead they were expected to get against Glamorgan, who had lost four games in the Championship before this. Former England batsman John Crawley crawled his way to a day-long century, while Kevin Pietersen took care of the fast scoring, making a century off 99 balls and ending with 126. Hampshire eventually made 401 for 8 declared to get full batting points before attacking Glamorgan. Chris Tremlett bowled well in the attempt, removing David Hemp, Mike Powell and Jonathan Hughes among others to take four for 42 and reduce Glamorgan to 229 – a score that would have been much lower but for Darren Thomas, who blitzed his way to 63. Following on, Glamorgan batted more casually, getting to 77 for 1 at stumps on day 3, but wickets tumbled in the morning, reducing Glamorgan to 147 for 5. Robert Croft and Mike Powell rebuilt, but when Australian batsman Simon Katich had Croft caught by skipper Shane Warne and Powell went a few overs later, Glamorgan imploded to 250 all out as Zimbabwe all-rounder Sean Ervine picked up the last three wickets, finishing with five for 60, while Tremlett took three for 48. In reply, Hampshire brushed aside the target of 79 inside fifteen overs, with Katich – unusually – opening the batting. With Nottinghamshire losing to Kent and Warwickshire and Surrey not playing, Hampshire took the lead in the Championship with their emphatic full-score win. (Cricinfo scorecard)

==== County Championship: Warwickshire v Hampshire (25–26 May) ====
Warwickshire (19pts) beat Hampshire (3pts) by ten wickets

Defending champions Warwickshire needed a win against table-toppers Hampshire to stay in the title chase, and in a low-scoring match at Stratford-on-Avon they managed it. The Scot Dougie Brown was the pick of the bowlers, taking four for 59 as the visitors crumbled to 184, rescued somewhat by a run-a-ball 34 from off-spinner Shaun Udal who batted at nine. Nick Knight and 22-year-old Ian Westwood, batting in his fourth first-class game, sent Warwickshire to 135 for 0 before losing a couple of wickets before stumps. The second day belonged to Hampshire, however, taking seven wickets – captain Shane Warne with six of them for 88 runs, as they crumbled to 265.

However, a magnificent spell from Zimbabwean all-rounder Heath Streak, who took four wickets for 11 from nine overs, including five maidens, reduced Hampshire to 34 for 5 before Michael Brown and Sean Ervine rebuilt. However, two quick wickets before tea meant that Hampshire led by six runs with three wickets remaining – a surefire loss, almost. They rebuilt somewhat, but another two wickets from Streak resulted in him finishing with 6 for 31, and Hampshire were bowled out for 124. Nick Knight then smashed 39 not out off 27 balls to see Warwickshire past the 44-run target inside 4.4 overs and a win inside two days. (Cricinfo scorecard)

==== National League: Hampshire v Northamptonshire (30 May) ====
Northamptonshire (4pts) beat Hampshire (0pts) by four wickets

Hampshire Hawks batted first at The Rose Bowl, and despite an unbeaten 100 from Greg Lamb – the first of his List A career – Hampshire were tied down to 226 for 7 off their 45 overs, mainly thanks to three for 30 from Australian Damien Wright. Six wides from Chris Tremlett, who conceded 51 runs off his eight overs then cost Hampshire the game after Shaun Udal had taken three wickets to set Northamptonshire Steelbacks back to 135 for 5. David Sales added 49 with Wright before Ben Phillips guided Northamptonshire to four points with 26 off 12 balls and secured a win with ten balls to spare.

(Cricinfo scorecard)

=== June ===
The first Championship game in June saw them come back to edge a win against Nottinghamshire by 14 runs, and they carried their good one-day form into the match with Lancashire which they won by 79 runs. They then lost heavily to England in a fifty-over game that provided the national side with practice prior to the NatWest Series with Bangladesh and Australia. Their title hopes were dented, however, as they went down by an innings to Surrey, and the Hawks took their rage out on a sorry Glamorgan side that were defeated by seven wickets.

==== County Championship: Nottinghamshire v Hampshire (1–4 June) ====
Hampshire (17pts) beat Nottinghamshire (4pts) by 14 runs

Hampshire pulled off a close win on the final day against their title rivals. There was no play on the first day at Trent Bridge because of rain. When play did get underway, Hampshire batted first, making 277 as Andrew Harris took 6 for 83. Nine Hampshire batsmen made double-figure scores, with only Kevin Pietersen (two-ball 0) and No. 11 Richard Logan dismissed for a one-digit score. More rain meant that Nottinghamshire were only on 222 for 5 in reply by the end of the third day. With both teams eager for the 14 points on offer for an outright victory, terms were agreed to between the two sides. Nottinghamshire declared overnight, and Hampshire replied by hitting 220 for 4 off 28.3 overs. These overs were bowled by Jason Gallian, David Hussey and Darren Bicknell – players who on average bowled a couple of overs a match, but who now bowled as Hampshire were invited to score quickly. Hussey got career best figures of four for 105. Nottinghamshire were set 276 to win, and a century from Stephen Fleming saw the hosts to 227 for 3, but after that they collapsed, losing their last five wickets for three runs, with Chris Tremlett taking 5 for 80, including a hat-trick as Hampshire edged the victory. (Cricinfo scorecard)

==== National League: Lancashire v Hampshire (5 June) ====
Hampshire (4pts) beat Lancashire (0pts) by 79 runs

Despite an economical bowling performance from England prospect James Anderson who took two for 18 off 7.5 overs, Lancashire Lightning imploded with the bat at home against Hampshire Hawks who moved out of the relegation zone as they took a 79-run win at Old Trafford. Hampshire batted first, and Derek Kenway top-scored with 65 as they were bowled out for 200, but Lancashire could only muster 121 against Hampshire's strong bowling attack, Chris Tremlett taking three for 30 while off-spinner Shaun Udal took three tail-enders for 11. (Cricinfo scorecard)

==== Warm-up Match: Hampshire v England (11 June) ====
England beat Hampshire by 153 runs

England warmed-up for the one-day NatWest Series that started on the 16th with an emphatic win in a 50-over game against Hampshire at the Rose Bowl, Southampton. England batted first, and disappointingly Geraint Jones failed once again as an opener, leaving after facing two balls for a duck. Marcus Trescothick also fell cheaply. The innings was steadied by Andrew Strauss, who made 85 off 108 balls, and local hero Kevin Pietersen, who made 77 off 80 balls, which included 2 sixes. In reply Hampshire were reduced to 14 for 6, with Darren Gough picking up a hat-trick. Simon Jones also picked up 3 wickets as Hampshire were all out for 85. (Cricinfo scorecard)

==== Warm-up Match: Hampshire v England (11 June 12-over match) ====
England beat Hampshire by one wicket

In a bonus 12-over match, arranged in haste as Hampshire were bowled out for 85 in the first match, Hampshire – led by hired-in Vikram Solanki who made 41 – scored 110 for 4, but were still beaten by a massive smash from Kevin Pietersen for England, as he scored 46 from 15 balls. However, that was not all – Chris Tremlett's three wickets threatened to ruin England's chase, but Simon Jones and Darren Gough saw them to the target on the last ball. (Cricinfo scorecard)

==== County Championship: Hampshire v Surrey (15–17 June) ====
Surrey (21pts) beat Hampshire (3pts) by an innings and 55 runs

A great team effort, despite Martin Bicknell being out of form, resulted in Surrey winning their third game of the season and sharing third place in the table with Hampshire. A healthy opening partnership between Scott Newman and Richard Clinton worth 100 was to be the highest of the entire match, and despite Chris Tremlett taking wickets regularly, he also conceded a lot of runs, as he ended with four for 106 off twenty overs. Newman eventually finished with 111 and Australian David Thornely made 73 to see Surrey to a final score of 361 – in just 81.4 overs. The first two days at The Rose Bowl were hampered by rain, but amid the showers, Indian bowler Harbhajan Singh took six for 36 as Hampshire crumbled in a rather unimpressive heap for 146. Only two batsmen passed 20, and seven were out in single figures. Hampshire's second innings began with the first ball of the third day, and James Ormond ripped out two wickets quickly, Mohammad Akram got a five-for, and only John Crawley's 67 – off 62 balls with thirteen boundaries, slightly out of place in the situation – passed 25. Thus, the two teams were tied on 100 points in the Championship, allowing Warwickshire and Kent to run away further on the table. (Cricinfo scorecard)

==== National League: Hampshire v Glamorgan (19 June) ====
Hampshire (4pts) beat Glamorgan (0pts) by seven wickets

A toothless bowling effort from Glamorgan Dragons became their downfall as Hampshire Hawks recorded a relatively comfortable seven-wicket win at The Rose Bowl. Batting first, Glamorgan were in a good position at 117 for 1, but Shaun Udal and Shane Warne chipped away at the Glamorgan middle-order. Robert Croft, the former England spinner, top-scored with a healthy 88, and an eighth-wicket partnership of 23 rescued Glamorgan to 211 for 7. It was never enough, however, as all Hampshire batsmen – excluding Derek Kenway, who was out for 4 – fired and took runs at will off the bowling. With 45 deliveries and seven wickets remaining, Hampshire eased to victory to increase the gap to the relegation zone. (Cricinfo scorecard)

=== Twenty20 Cup Group Stage ===
Hampshire were without a win for the first two Twenty20 games, losing to Middlesex in a close game before having a match with Sussex rained off, but they won a low-scoring match against Surrey Lions at the Oval. They followed up with a win over Kent and two no-results with Essex, but a loss to Sussex were to be crucial. Despite a win over Middlesex on the last matchday, they were still behind Middlesex on games won, and behind Sussex on head-to-head, thus they finished fourth in the table and did not qualify for the quarter-finals.

==== Hampshire v Middlesex (22 June) ====
Middlesex (2pts) beat Hampshire (0pts) by 18 runs

Owais Shah made a good attempt at getting the highest strike-rate of the opening day of Twenty20 cricket, recording 72 runs off only 30 balls to lift Middlesex Crusaders to an unassailable 210 for 6. For Hampshire Hawks, Shane Warne showed somewhat poor captaincy when Zimbabwean all-rounder Sean Ervine was the eighth man to come on to bowl – and then took two for 13 from two overs. New Zealander Craig McMillan, meanwhile, conceded twenty-eight runs from his only over. Despite Nic Pothas scoring 59 off 39 balls, the Hawks were nowhere near keeping up with the required pace, and Middlesex bowler Irfan Pathan was a main cause of that – he took three for 16 from four overs, as Hampshire finished on 192 for 7. (Cricinfo scorecard)

==== Hampshire v Sussex (24 June) ====
No result; Hampshire (1pt), Sussex (1pt)

Rain caused the match between Hampshire Hawks and Sussex Sharks to be abandoned. Despite the fact that a ball was not bowled, the match was declared a no-result since a toss was made. (Cricinfo scorecard)

==== Surrey v Hampshire (25 June) ====
Hampshire (2pts) beat Surrey (0pts) by three wickets

James Bruce and Richard Logan, Hampshire Hawks' new-ball bowlers, reduced Surrey Lions to pieces at the Oval. Only Rikki Clarke passed 12 runs for Surrey, and he did so in style, making 52 with six fours and a six, while Logan and Bruce shared seven wickets between them. Hampshire had reason to be happy with bowling Surrey out for 118, although they did concede 17 wides, as extras were the second highest scorer for Surrey. Hampshire then attempted to collapse of their own, crashing to 6 for 2 and 66 for 7, but 34 from off-spinner and captain Shaun Udal saw them home without any further loss of wickets. (Cricinfo scorecard)

==== Hampshire v Kent (27 June) ====
Hampshire (2pts) beat Kent (0pts) by five wickets

Zimbabwean Greg Lamb, playing for the Hampshire Hawks as a home qualified player due to owning an English passport, took four wickets, including three former Test players, for 28 – which helped peg Kent Spitfires back to 154 for 9. Hampshire's reply was very well timed, and even a good bowling spell from Kent's James Tredwell – who only conceded sixteen runs off the bat in four overs – could not stop the Hawks. Lawrence Prittipaul made 35 before being out on the penultimate ball with the scores tied, but off-spinner and stand-in captain Shaun Udal, however, made a single on the last ball, as Hampshire reached 155 for 5 in their 20 overs – Nic Pothas top-scoring with 58. (Cricinfo scorecard)

==== Hampshire v Essex (28 June) ====
Match abandoned; Hampshire (1pt), Essex (1pt)

Hampshire Hawks and Essex Eagles shared the spoils as the match at The Rose Bowl, Southampton never got underway. (Cricinfo scorecard)

==== Essex v Hampshire (29 June) ====
No result; Essex (1pt), Hampshire (1pt)

Hampshire Hawks endured their second no-result in two days against Essex Eagles, having batted to a competitive total of 151 for 9 in their 20 overs, with Greg Lamb making 67. However, the Essex innings never got off, due to rain. (Cricinfo scorecard)

==== Sussex v Hampshire (1 July) ====
Sussex (2pts) beat Hampshire (0pts) by 10 runs

A twelve-over game at Hove was won by Sussex Sharks, though the rain threatened to destroy it all. Ian Ward and Matt Prior opened the batting for Sussex, who had been sent in to bat by Hampshire Hawks' captain Shaun Udal, and they made good use of it, sending Sussex to 53 for 0. Two quick wickets from Sean Ervine slowed the Sharks' progression, as they slumped to 88 for 5, but Michael Yardy hit 10 in four balls in an unbeaten 11-run sixth-wicket stand with Carl Hopkinson. Chasing, Hampshire never quite kept up with the required run rate, as Mushtaq Ahmed took three for 19 in his three overs to be the main cause of the Hawks' demise, and Hampshire finished on 89 for 6. (Cricinfo scorecard)

==== Middlesex v Hampshire (6 July) ====
Hampshire (2pts) beat Middlesex (0pts) by six wickets

In a high-scoring match at Richmond, Middlesex Crusaders made 174 for 7 having opted to bat first. Owais Shah made yet another fifty – his fifth in eight innings – while Scott Styris and Paul Weekes made quick scores to up the run-rate. Shaun Udal, Sean Ervine and Craig McMillan all got two wickets. Hampshire Hawks started slowly, at about seven an over, but McMillan took a liking to Chris Peploe in particular as he smashed five sixes in his half-hour 65 not out, and thanks to McMillan's big hitting Hampshire won with sixteen balls and six wickets to spare. However, it was in vain – with only three wins, they finished fourth in the South Division tables, while Middlesex qualified despite having a poorer net run rate than Hampshire. (Cricinfo scorecard)

=== July ===
Middlesex, however, beat Hampshire rather comfortably in the County Championship the following week, to send Hampshire nearer the relegation mire, and after the loss to Nottinghamshire in the National League it became woefully clear that Hampshire's lack of Pietersen and Warne hurt them. However, they succeeded in digging out a 35-run win over Sussex, who only needed 104 for seven wickets on the fourth day, but were bowled out by Dimitri Mascarenhas and Sean Ervine. Two rained off matches followed, against Bangladesh A and Worcestershire Royals.

==== County Championship: Middlesex v Hampshire (8–11 July) ====
Middlesex (19pts) beat Hampshire (7pts) by two wickets

Hampshire won the toss and chose to bat at a Southgate wicket which the final scores suggested to be not as batting-friendly as a month ago, when 13 wickets fell in the Championship match between Middlesex and Glamorgan. Three wickets from Chris Peploe set the visitors back to 189 for 7, but a 79-ball century from Shane Warne – just in time to get some Ashes form – lifted them to 355. The returning Irishman, Ed Joyce, made 54 for Middlesex, and Jamie Dalrymple made 62, but despite those innings – and 37 extras – Middlesex could only scamper 272.

Hampshire were leading by 104 overnight with one wicket down, but the third day belonged to Dalrymple. The Kenyan-born off-spinner took four for 53, including internationals John Crawley and Craig McMillan, as Hampshire imploded to 192. A Twenty20 style hit-out from Owais Shah, who made 60 off 56 balls, lifted Middlesex to 168 for 4 at stumps, and as the Hampshire captain Warne chose to bowl himself over after over despite being smashed out of the park (ending with 108 runs off nearly 30 overs for only two wickets), Middlesex reached the target shortly before lunch on day four with two wickets to spare, despite losing three wickets to Shaun Udal and two to Zimbabwean part-timer Greg Lamb. (Cricinfo scorecard)

==== C&G Trophy Quarter-Final: Surrey v Hampshire (15 July) ====
Hampshire beat Surrey by two wickets to progress to the Semi-Finals of the C&G Trophy

Despite an unbeaten 158 from Jonathan Batty, Surrey still lost their quarter-final game at The Oval, having first batted to make 358 for 6 in 50 overs. James Benning with 73, and Graham Thorpe with 60, also contributed, as Hampshire used seven bowlers who all failed to keep their conceded runs below six an over. In reply, Azhar Mahmood served up a wicket maiden over in the first over of Hampshire's innings, leaving Hampshire 359 to win with nine wickets in hand, but Shane Watson and Craig McMillan put the visitors from the south back on track with a partnership of 81 for the fourth wicket. When McMillan was run out, Hampshire were 200 for 4, but Watson powered on to make 132, his highest career List A cricket score to boost Hampshire to 342 for 8 when Tim Murtagh broke through his defences. By then, it was too late, as Shaun Udal completed his 44 not out, having added 63 with Watson for the eighth wicket earlier, and Hampshire made it to the target with thirteen balls to spare – although they had been given eleven extra balls due to no-balls and wides. (Cricinfo scorecard)

==== National League: Nottinghamshire v Hampshire (17 July) ====
Nottinghamshire (4pts) beat Hampshire (0pts) by one wicket

Captain Stephen Fleming stood tall for Nottinghamshire Outlaws winning them the game as they chased down 241 at Trent Bridge. Hampshire Hawks had batted first, and no Hawk batsman converted their starts, and Gareth Clough's two for 44 threatened to stop their innings prematurely, as they were 152 for 6 when Kevin Latouf gave a return catch to Samit Patel. However, a big seventh-wicket partnership between Dimitri Mascarenhas and Sean Ervine lifted Hampshire to 240 for 8. Mascarenhas and Ervine also grabbed two wickets each in the Nottinghamshire reply, and things looked grim for the hosts when Chris Read departed for 4 with Nottinghamshire still needing 114 runs for the last four wickets.

However, Fleming and Mark Ealham put the chase back on with a partnership of 75, before Hampshire struck again with wickets in successive overs, and then Shaun Udal had Greg Smith lbw for 6. Needing 15 for the last wicket, Fleming shielded Andrew Harris from strike (Harris faced three balls in a partnership of 19), to end with 102 not out – his sixteenth one-day century – to win the match for Nottinghamshire with an over to spare. Notable also was the 36 extras Hampshire conceded, including six penalty runs. (Cricinfo scorecard)

==== County Championship: Hampshire v Sussex (20–23 July) ====
Hampshire (19.5pts) beat Sussex (6pts) by 35 runs

Hampshire's veteran wicketkeeper Nic Pothas made his way to a four-hour 135, his twelfth first-class century, after Jason Lewry, James Kirtley and Rana Naved-ul-Hasan had reduced Hampshire to 102 for 6 in the middle of the afternoon session on the first day. Pothas was well supported by Zimbabwean Sean Ervine, who made 69, and the pair added 191 in three hours before Naved-ul-Hasan broke through with the last ball of the day, having Ervine caught by Ian Ward. Hampshire slumped to 309 on the morning of day two, and solid contributions from the entire batting order – bar number three Michael Yardy who made a duck – lifted Sussex to a slender seven-run lead amid Ervine's swing bowling, which yielded five wickets for 73. However, Mushtaq Ahmed got the early breakthrough for Sussex, and James Kirtley ripped out two quick wickets as Hampshire folded to 22 for 3 overnight.

Kirtley and Naved-ul-Hasan continued to pile on the pressure on the third morning, as they eked out two catches and reduced Hampshire to 28 for 5, a lead of 21. However, once again, the all-rounders fought back. Australian Shane Watson made 82, while Pothas added 74, and number 11 Chris Tremlett made an unbeaten 44 to ensure that Hampshire set a competitive target of 271, despite Kirtley's five for 67. Ian Ward made 60 and Murray Goodwin an unbeaten 51 as Sussex cruised to 167 for 3 after only 38 overs on day three, needing 104 more to win on the fourth day.

Goodwin added 20 more on the final morning before Dimitri Mascarenhas snared him out, but he had stood tall in Mascarenhas' early spell on the morning of day 4, which had yielded three wickets for two runs. Goodwin was eventually caught by Greg Lamb, but Sussex still needed only 55 for the last three wickets – however, Sean Ervine added the wickets of Pakistanis Rana and Ahmed to his tally to help bowl Sussex out for 235. Thus, Hampshire took the victory in a closely contested game, although they were later deducted half a point for a slow over rate. (Cricinfo scorecard)

==== Tour Match: Hampshire v Bangladesh A (24 July) ====
Match abandoned without a ball bowled

Rain at Rose Bowl, Southampton prevented Bangladesh A from playing their third scheduled match on their tour of England, against Hampshire. (Cricinfo scorecard)

==== National League: Hampshire v Worcestershire (26 July) ====
Match abandoned without a ball bowled; Hampshire (2pts), Worcestershire (2pts)

At Rose Bowl, Southampton it was not possible to play cricket due to rain, and the two teams Hampshire Hawks and Worcestershire Royals walked away with two points each. (Cricinfo scorecard)

=== August ===
August started with a comprehensive 178-run win over a battling Gloucestershire side, which saw Hampshire into second place in the Championship table, but this was followed up with a loss to the same side in the National League. Three days later, however, they avenged that by beating Lancashire, and then Hampshire invited Kent to a top-of-the-table clash. However, this match was drawn, leaving the title battle in Division One wide open. Five days later, the team beat Yorkshire to qualify for the C&G Trophy Final, and the one-day success continued with a four-wicket National League defeat of Worcestershire. Their second Championship draw in a row came against Surrey later on in the week, before they lost to champions Essex Eagles on the last Sunday of August.

==== County Championship: Gloucestershire v Hampshire (3–6 August) ====
Hampshire (21pts) beat Gloucestershire (7pts) by 178 runs

Gloucestershire bowlers Steve Kirby, Jon Lewis and Malinga Bandara threatened to make a mockery of Shaun Udal's decision to have a bat at Bristol, as Hampshire fell to 81 for 7, with five batsmen out for single-figures. However, a 257-run partnership – a Hampshire record for the eighth wicket – between Nic Pothas and Andy Bichel turned the match around, as Lewis was carted for 112 runs in his 20 overs, despite five of them being maiden overs. Hampshire finished their innings on 385 all out, after Pothas had made 139 and Bichel 138, and Gloucestershire struggled initially with the bat, losing their first two wickets for 25 runs (admittedly with Kirby filling the role of nightwatchman).

On the second day, Alex Gidman posted 115 and Steve Adshead 73 to lift Gloucestershire from 191 for 6 to 363. Hampshire then collapsed again, falling to 23 for 3 (including the wicket of nightwatchman Chris Tremlett) before John Crawley and Shane Watson rescued them with a 120-run partnership, as spinners Bandara and Ian Fisher toiled away to little effect. Hampshire eventually declared on 388 for 7, with four of their batsmen passing fifty, which left Gloucestershire 411 to win in a day. That never looked likely, but attritional cricket from Ramnaresh Sarwan and Matt Windows lifted Gloucestershire to 156 for 2, and then Gidman came in to add a further 39 for the fourth wicket. However, Shane Watson got a vital breakthrough with the wicket of Gidman, Shaun Udal unleashed a spell of furious off-spin on the tail, taking six for 61, and Gloucestershire were bowled out with an hour to spare. (Cricinfo scorecard)

==== National League: Gloucestershire v Hampshire (7 August) ====
Gloucestershire (4pts) beat Hampshire (0pts) by five wickets

Mark Hardinges took four for 40 to help Gloucestershire Gladiators record a thumping victory over Hampshire Hawks, after tying down and frustrating the opponents' batsmen. Hardinges was the main culprit as Hampshire lost their last nine wickets for exactly 100 runs to post a total of 178, despite Nic Pothas, Sean Ervine and Shane Watson all making at least 40. In reply, William Weston and Matt Windows paired up for 106 runs for the second wicket, and not even Chris Tremlett, who took three for 34, could stop Gloucestershire from reaching the target with more than ten overs to spare. (Cricinfo scorecard)

==== National League: Hampshire v Lancashire (10 August) ====
Hampshire (4pts) beat Lancashire (0pts) by eight runs

Hampshire Hawks recovered to post a challenging target after early setbacks, caused by two wickets from Lancashire Lightning spinner Andrew Symonds and losing Nic Pothas early through a run out. They struggled to 86 for 4 before Shane Watson put them back on track with an unbeaten 106, helped by Greg Lamb, who made 42. In a match dominated by foreign or foreign-born players, Marcus North and Symonds put on a 94-run partnership to help Lancashire to 155 for 2. However, Australian all-rounder Andy Bichel took three for 34, Dimitri Mascarenhas rounded off his nine overs by taking two wickets with the two last balls, and Lancashire were left to score 23 from 24 balls with a wicket in hand. James Anderson tried, hitting two fours, but with nine required off ten balls he was lbw to Shaun Udal for nine to give Hampshire an eight-run victory. (Cricinfo scorecard)

==== County Championship: Hampshire v Kent (12–15 August) ====
Kent (12pts) drew with Hampshire (10pts)

Darren Stevens and Rob Key both passed 1,000 first-class runs for the season as they lifted Kent to a competitive total at The Rose Bowl. Stevens top-scored with 101, while Hampshire's Australian all-rounder Andy Bichel took four for 122 – but was thoroughly smacked about by Min Patel and Amjad Khan on the second morning. The pair added 65 for the final wicket to take Kent to a first-innings total of 446. Sean Ervine hit plenty of boundaries in reply, as Hampshire eased to 82 for 1 before play was stopped due to bad weather.

On day three, however, Kent hit back. In 33 fiery overs before lunch, Amjad Khan and Min Patel both took two wickets, and despite more runs from Ervine – who finished with 74 – Hampshire crumbled to 182 for 7 at lunch. However, Andy Bichel and Nic Pothas added 138 for the eighth wicket, as Hampshire eked out 325, with Bichel top-scoring from number nine with 87 off 90 balls. Kent got a good start to their attempt to get quick runs and put a big target up for Hampshire, as they moved to 140 for 4 just before the close of play, but Shane Watson took two quick wickets and Shaun Udal one, and all of a sudden it was up to Justin Kemp and Andrew Hall to save Kent, as they were 153 for 7 overnight. Kemp fell on the fourth morning, as Kent rolled over for 185, setting up a potentially exciting finish with 307 runs to get in 83 overs. A 95-run partnership between Sean Ervine and John Crawley put Hampshire into a good position at 139 for 1, but Hampshire failed to score quickly enough, and three wickets from Simon Cook could not quite force a victory as Hampshire hung on to finish on 241 for 8 and draw the match. (Cricinfo scorecard)

==== C&G Trophy Semi-Final: Hampshire v Yorkshire (20 August) ====
Hampshire beat Yorkshire by eight wickets to progress to the C&G Trophy Final

Yorkshire never managed to score in the semi-final match at The Rose Bowl, which meant that Hampshire were set a relatively easy target of 198 to win. Michael Lumb top-scored with 43, but the late order failed to score runs quickly enough to get past 200; number ten John Blain only made six off 20 deliveries, while number nine Tim Bresnan made three off ten. Yorkshireman Deon Kruis served up some economical bowling early on to John Crawley, and bowled him for a 28-ball 8, but a 147-run partnership between Nic Pothas and Sean Ervine saw Hampshire right on track, as they won with over 10 overs to spare. Ervine made his second List A century, off 96 balls, but was caught and bowled by Richard Dawson three balls later. It didn't matter much – Hampshire only needed 20 runs to win, and Shane Watson and Nic Pothas knocked them off to book Hampshire's place in the C&G Trophy final. (Cricinfo scorecard)

==== National League: Worcestershire v Hampshire (22 August) ====
Hampshire (4pts) beat Worcestershire (0pts) by four wickets

Hampshire Hawks got the four points from a closely fought match at New Road. Worcestershire Royals had won the toss and chosen to bat, and their innings was shortened to 34 overs out of a scheduled 45 due to rain. Wickets fell regularly, four batsmen being dismissed with scores in the thirties, and the final score of 185 for 7 did not look too threatening. John Crawley and Shane Watson put Hampshire back on track after two early wickets from Kabir Ali shook them, but an economical spell from Ray Price which yielded two wickets was nearly enough. However, the other spinner Gareth Batty was not nearly as economical, and Greg Lamb took him for runs to end with 16 not out and win the game for Hampshire.

==== County Championship: Surrey v Hampshire (24–27 August) ====
Hampshire (11pts) drew with Surrey (10pts)

The first day was rained off, and in only three days of cricket, neither team seemed intent on forcing a result, as the run rate was limited to 3.5 runs an over. On the second day, as the first day of actual play, 406 runs were scored for the loss of twelve wickets. Surrey batted first, and after losing Richard Clinton and Mark Ramprakash early, Scott Newman lashed out in a 65-ball cameo. He hit fifteen fours in his 71 before finally being bowled by Dimitri Mascarenhas. Indeed, the second day was a day of boundaries – a total of 270 runs were hit in boundaries, most of them by Mark Butcher (14 fours in 75) and Jonathan Batty (20 fours in 124). Surrey were eventually all out for 378, Shaun Udal wrapping up the tail with the three last wickets falling in four balls. Mohammad Akram then had both openers caught behind as Hampshire closed on 28 for 2, but Surrey toiled for little reward on the third day, Nic Pothas making an unbeaten century as Hampshire declared on 361 for 6, 17 behind Surrey. Thus, the teams were left with a day to play out their second innings, and on the final day, Udal took five for 65 with his off breaks, but Surrey easily saved the draw by making 302, as captain Butcher did not attempt to risk the four points for a draw with a declaration. (Cricinfo scorecard)

==== National League: Essex v Hampshire (28 August) ====
Essex (4pts) beat Hampshire (0pts) by 12 runs

Economical bowling from André Nel and Danish Kaneria gave Essex Eagles the victory over Hampshire Hawks at Chelmsford, and the four points for the win increased their lead in the National League to an unassailable 14 points and secured the National League title. Essex opener William Jefferson kept his calm while the rest of the top order deserted him, making 88, but when three wickets fell for only three runs and the score was 172 for 7 Hampshire would have fancied their chances of bowling Essex out. Only two more wickets fell, though, as contributions from Ryan ten Doeschate, Graham Napier and Kaneria propelled Essex to 222 for 9 at the end of their 45 overs. Hampshire and England fast bowler Chris Tremlett got Napier, ten Doeschate and James Middlebrook out to end with three wickets for 48. Despite John Crawley and Nic Pothas recording a first-wicket partnership of 95, Kaneria kept his calm, only allowing 26 runs off his nine overs, and boundaries were rare after Pothas and Crawley were dismissed. In the end, Hampshire finished on 210 for 8, 13 runs short of victory – they could put some of the blame on their overseas players, as Australians Shane Watson and Andy Bichel contributed only four runs off 18 deliveries. (Cricinfo scorecard)

=== September ===
A three-day win over Warwickshire saw them enjoy one day at the top of the Championship, before they were overtaken by Nottinghamshire. On 3 September, however, they won the C&G Trophy with an 18-run win over Warwickshire, meaning that they were the only club with a chance of winning two titles in 2005. Their one-day form didn't carry into the League, however, as they lost by two wickets to Middlesex, moving closer to relegation, and that trend continued with a 151-run defeat to Glamorgan. However, they recovered to beat Glamorgan in the Championship, and ended the Championship season with a thumping innings-and-188 run victory over the county champions Nottinghamshire, to finish second, 2.5 points behind. Hampshire then lost their final game of the season, to just Nottinghamshire, which led to their relegation into Division Two of the National League.

==== County Championship: Hampshire v Warwickshire (30 August – 1 September) ====
Hampshire (22pts) beat Warwickshire (4pts) by an innings and 86 runs

Hampshire dominated proceedings against Warwickshire at The Rose Bowl, occupying the crease for a day and a half to amass 576 runs in their first innings. The top three of James Adams, Sean Ervine and John Crawley set the tone with fifties, and when Crawley departed for 60 the score had moved to 279 for 3. Jonathan Trott and Makhaya Ntini shared three wickets before the end of the day, leaving Hampshire 353 for 6 overnight, but Shane Watson and Dimitri Mascarenhas shared a mammoth 234-run partnership for the seventh wicket. Watson hit a career-best 203 not out, while Mascarenhas took three hours for an unbeaten 102, the first century of his season, before Shaun Udal declared. Warwickshire stumbled early on, falling to 21 for 2, but an unbeaten 97 from Nick Knight lifted them to 145 for 4 at the close of play on day two.

Knight could not save Warwickshire alone, though, and Warwickshire lost sixteen wickets on the third day to crumble to an innings defeat. Knight got his century, ending with 116, but no other batsman passed 30, as they were all out for 258 in the first innings. They were asked to follow on 318 behind, and did rather well initially, getting the score to 110 for 1 after two hours. Then, Jonathan Trott and Ian Westwood fell in quick succession, leaving Jamie Troughton to try to tie together a match-saving innings with the lower order. He made a two-hour 76 before being ninth out, caught off Shaun Udal's bowling, ending Warwickshire's resistance. No further runs were added for the tenth wicket, as Makhaya Ntini was bowled by Udal, and Warwickshire ended on 232 all out – 86 runs short of making Hampshire bat again. Hampshire captain Udal finished with a second innings analysis of 22–8–44–6, after only one wicket in the first innings. The win left Hampshire briefly on top of the Championship, before Nottinghamshire took over the following day. (Cricinfo scorecard)

==== C&G Trophy Final: Hampshire v Warwickshire (3 September) ====
Hampshire won by 18 runs and won the C&G Trophy

Hampshire became the third team to win a major county trophy in 2005, as they prevailed in a high-scoring final at Lord's, leaving only the County Championship left for grabs. Nic Pothas and Sean Ervine added 136 runs for the second wicket to propel Hampshire to a big total against Warwickshire, whose bowlers gave away 20 runs from wides but still managed to bowl Hampshire out on the last ball. Ervine was fifth out, taking 91 balls for his second successive C&G century, before he was caught off Jonathan Trott, who finished with three wickets for 35 runs. Neil Carter took five wickets to redeem his 66 conceded runs, while Makhaya Ntini bowled two maiden overs for Warwickshire, but went wicketless.

Warwickshire were set to chase 291 to win, and Carter fulfilled his job as a pinch hitter well, scoring four fours and one six en route to 32, and Nick Knight and Ian Bell kept up with the required run rate well. However, Bell suffered cramps just before he reached 50, and that limited his movements – he succumbed shortly afterwards, chipping a simple catch to Chris Tremlett and was gone for 54. The other batsmen tried to add runs with Knight, but yielded to the Hampshire bowling and fielding effort, and when Knight was finally dismissed for 118 Warwickshire needed 40 runs for the last three wickets. Shane Watson effectively stopped that, having Dougie Brown and Ashley Giles out bowled, leaving Warwickshire to hit about 20 runs in the last over. It was too much for Makhaya Ntini, who was bowled by Chris Tremlett with the second ball of the last over, and thus Hampshire took an 18-run victory. (Cricinfo scorecard)

==== National League: Hampshire v Middlesex (5 September) ====
Middlesex (4pts) beat Hampshire (0pts) by two wickets

Two days after their win in the C&G Trophy Final, Hampshire Hawks were defeated by Middlesex Crusaders, to move closer to relegation in the National League. They were put in to bat, and lost wicket-keeper Nic Pothas for 5 early on, but John Crawley and Sean Ervine fought back with a 101-run partnership for the second wicket. The Middlesex bowlers frequently interrupted with wickets, though, and Crawley failed to hit the ball hard enough to end with only six fours in his 122-ball 92. Hampshire closed on 227 for 6, with five Middlesex bowler. Middlesex lost Paul Weekes in the first over, but a blistering 139-run stand between Owais Shah and Jamie Dalrymple turned the match around. Despite three wickets each from Hampshire's Chris Tremlett and Greg Lamb, Middlesex' Chris Peploe held his head calm, and with 14 not out he guided Middlesex to a two-wicket victory with 11 balls to spare. (Cricinfo scorecard)

==== National League: Glamorgan v Hampshire (13 September) ====
Glamorgan (4pts) beat Hampshire (0pts) by 151 runs

Glamorgan Dragons recorded a victory at their home ground Sophia Gardens, despite being tied down in mid-match by Sean Ervine and Shaun Udal who took two wickets each and both conceded less than 40 runs. Wicket-keeper Mark Wallace hit one six and one four in a valuable hit-out late on, while Mike Powell had set the pace with 52. Then, Hampshire Hawks were shot down in the chase. David Harrison had John Crawley caught with the second ball of the match, and Andrew Davies followed up, getting Greg Lamb and Ervine caught behind. With James Adams bowled by Harrison, Hampshire had scored seven runs for four wickets, and their lower order never recovered. Jono McLean was the first to hit into double figures, before he too was caught behind off Davies, and Harrison then took two as Hampshire were 33 for 7. Kevin Latouf and Shaun Udal adjusted somewhat, adding 19 for the eighth wicket, but first change bowler Alex Wharf cleaned up them as well, leaving Hampshire all out for 69 – the lowest score of the National League Division One all season, and giving Glamorgan the highest victory by runs in the division all season. (Cricinfo scorecard)

==== County Championship: Glamorgan v Hampshire (15–18 September) ====
Hampshire (21pts) beat Glamorgan (4pts) by 75 runs

The first day of this match was rained off, and so Glamorgan's last match of the season was effectively reduced to a three-day one. They still managed to lose, however, capping their Championship season with their fourteenth loss in sixteen matches to cement their last place in the table. When the match got underway, the entire Hampshire batting order made contributions, and an innings including half-centuries from James Adams, Jono McLean, Simon Katich and Dimitri Mascarenhas, saw them to a total of 350. Australia leg spinner Shane Warne hit three sixes in a 17-minute 24, while Glamorgan captain Robert Croft snared five wickets for 103 runs.

The returning Shane Warne, fresh from taking 40 wickets in the 2005 Ashes, took four for 50 in Glamorgan's innings, as Glamorgan faltered from 151 for 4 to 249 all out, and the third day's play ended with Simon Katich and Sean Ervine plundering runs in return. An opening stand of 117 was achieved quickly, and Warne then clobbered two sixes in a nine-ball 15, as Hampshire added 218 for 7 in just 32 overs before declaring. Croft completed another five-wicket-haul, but still conceded 57 in ten overs. Set 320 to win, Glamorgan went about it positively, as Croft led from the front with a well-paced 90. Once he was caught behind off Sean Ervine, however, Glamorgan needed 94 for the last three wickets, and the lower order succumbed to the Zimbabwean Ervine. Wicket-keeper and number eight Mark Wallace was left not out on 33, as Glamorgan posted a total of 244, while Ervine finished with five for 60 in the second innings, his best bowling figures of the season thus far. (Cricinfo scorecard)

==== County Championship: Hampshire v Nottinghamshire (21–23 September) ====
Hampshire (22pts) beat Nottinghamshire (2pts) by an innings and 188 runs

Hampshire were put in to bat by Nottinghamshire, who had won the Championship four days earlier. However, Hampshire's batsmen all put in above 50 scores after Sean Ervine was bowled for 9, James Adams, John Crawley, Simon Katich and Nic Pothas all exceeded 50, and Crawley went on to make 150 not out at the end of the first day – his highest score of the season. Boosted by 75 extras – 38 coming in no-balls, of which 18 were conceded by Mark Footitt alone – Hampshire ended their innings voluntarily on 714 for 5 – a team record – having hit 290 runs for one wicket in 42.3 second-day overs. Captain Shane Warne declared when Mascarenhas got his century, only to later discover that Crawley – who had gone from 200 to 300 with 58 balls – had been denied of the Hampshire highest innings score by five runs, despite a career-best 311 not out . Dick Moore's record from 1937 thus remained. When Hampshire bowled, spinner Shaun Udal celebrated his England call-up with four wickets for 39 runs, while Mascarenhas continued with his all-round effort, taking his second five-wicket-haul of the season as Nottinghamshire were bowled out for 213 shortly before the close on day two. Warne chose to bowl eight balls, conceding six runs. Stephen Fleming top scored for the visitors with 42, as they were asked to follow on – 501 runs behind Hampshire.

Nottinghamshire needed 269 to avoid suffering the highest defeat of the Championship season, and amid the rain breaks at the Rose Bowl, they passed that score with one wicket in hand, thanks to 97 from Darren Bicknell and a 49-ball cameo from Chris Read which yielded 63 runs. Captain Stephen Fleming lasted four minutes at the crease, hitting three fours, a single and a dot ball before he was caught by James Adams off Warne. Udal took another four-wicket-haul, but conceded 70 in 11.5 overs, and even Warne was expensive, conceding 67 in thirteen overs. Nottinghamshire were eventually bowled out for 313, but Hampshire finished 2.5 points behind Nottinghamshire in the Championship – despite the same win–loss record and two victories in their head-to-head matches. (Cricinfo scorecard)

==== National League: Hampshire v Nottinghamshire (25 September) ====
Nottinghamshire (4pts) beat Hampshire (0pts) by 37 runs on the Duckworth–Lewis method

Hampshire Hawks were defeated by Nottinghamshire, in particular David Hussey and Ryan Sidebottom, to go down into Division Two in front of their home crowd. The visiting Nottinghamshire Outlaws batted first, and after a slow start where Anurag Singh and Stephen Fleming had accumulated forties to see them to 101 for 3, Hussey hit loose. He hit five sixes in a 53-ball 75 which, together with 26 off 13 balls from Mark Ealham, took Nottinghamshire to 248 for 5. Then rain intervened, cutting 25 overs off the Hampshire effort. When they came back to bat, Hampshire were set 165 to win – and duly lost six wickets for 58 runs, Gareth Clough having two men bowled and captain Shane Warne lbw. Jono McLean hit 36 from number eight, but Hampshire were still taken out for 127 a ball before the end – Ryan Sidebottom finishing them off by having Billy Taylor caught for 0. Sidebottom thus finished with three for 13 from 23 balls.
