= James Adams (cricketer, born 1980) =

English cricketer

Personal information
- Full name: James Kenneth Adams
- Born: 23 September 1980 (age 46); Winchester, Hampshire, England
- Nickname: Bison, Hippy, Jimmy
- Height: 6 ft 1 in (1.85 m)
- Batting: Left-handed
- Bowling: Left arm medium

Domestic team information
- Years: Team
- 2002–2018: Hampshire (squad no. 4)
- 2008: Dorset
- 2010/11–2011/12: Auckland
- 2013: Marylebone Cricket Club

Career statistics
Competition	FC	LA	T20
Matches	233	123	135
Runs scored	14,135	4,032	2,643
Batting average	37.29	39.52	24.02
100s/50s	25/73	2/30	2/9
Top score	262*	131	101*
Balls bowled	1,075	79	36
Wickets	13	1	0
Bowling average	55.46	105.00	–
5 wickets in innings	0	0	–
10 wickets in match	0	0	–
Best bowling	2/16	1/34	–
Catches/stumpings	188/–	51/–	36/–
- Source: Cricinfo, 28 September 2018

James Henry Kenneth Adams (born 23 September 1980) is an English former professional cricketer who played county cricket for Hampshire between 2002 and 2018. Born in Winchester, Adams made his way through the youth system at Hampshire and played age-group cricket for England, including in the 2000 Under-19 World Cup. After completing his school-level education, Adams studied at Loughborough University, where he played first-class cricket for Loughborough UCCE. Having made his senior debut for Hampshire in 2002, Adams took several seasons to establish himself in the team as an opening batsman. By the 2006 season, he became a regular in the Hampshire team in the County Championship and became establish himself as a limited-overs batsman in the seasons that followed. Adams succeeded Dimitri Mascarenhas as Hampshire captained in the County Championship and one-day cricket in 2013, becoming the first Hampshire-born cricketer to captain the county since the Second World War. Under his leadership, they gained promotion from Division Two of the Championship in 2014. He had success in Twenty20 (T20) cricket, winning the Twenty20 Cup in 2010 and 2012, and the 2010–11 HRV Cup in New Zealand with Auckland.

Adams made 233 first-class, 133 one-day and 123 T20 appearances for the Hampshire between 2002 and 2018, scoring nearly 20,000 runs across all formats. In first-class cricket, he passed 1,000 runs in a season on five occasions and made 25 centuries, five of which were double-centuries. In one-day and T20 cricket, he scored 4,032 runs and 2,643 runs respectively. Possessing a classical batting technique that was naturally suited to the first-class game, the cricket journalist Freddie Wilde observed that Adams had begun his career as "a red-ball player first and white-ball second", but later became "an unlikely batting leader of a T20 dynasty" during Hampshire's success in the format in the early 2010s. After retiring from playing in 2018, he went into coaching with Hampshire and the Hobart Hurricanes in the Big Bash League.

== Early life ==
The eldest of four children, James Kenneth Adams was born in Winchester on 23 September 1980. He was first educated at Twyford School, near to his family home, where he was coached by Bob Stephenson. From there, he attended Sherborne School. He played club cricket in his youth for St Cross Symondians, and was a member of Hampshire's youth setup from the age of 11. He played for England at Under-15 level. After leaving Sherborne, he matriculated to University College London and continued his higher education at Loughborough University, studying human biology.

== Cricket ==
=== Early career ===
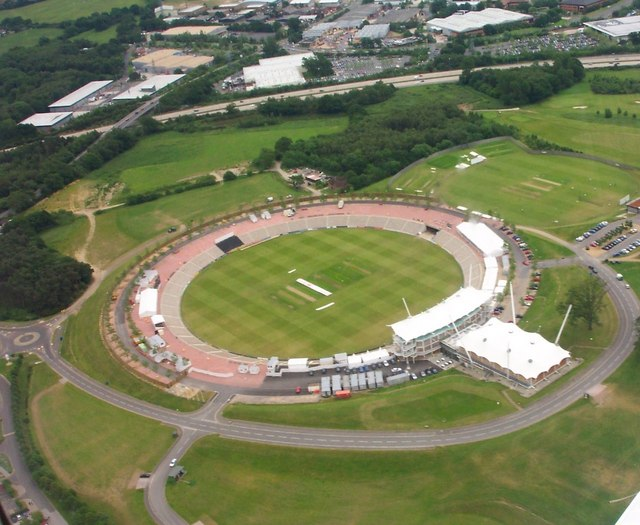
Adams faced the first ball to be bowled at the Rose Bowl (pictured) in 2000

Adams played for England Under-19 in the 2000 Under-19 World Cup, making three Youth One Day International appearances in the tournament. He also played one Youth Test against Sri Lanka Under-19 in 2000. For Hampshire, he began playing Second XI Championship cricket in 1999, and in 2000 he faced the first bowl to be bowled at Hampshire's new Rose Bowl complex in a Second Eleven fixture on the Nursery Ground. He turned professional at the end of the 1999 season. Adams made his debut in first-class cricket when he was selected to play for the British Universities team against the touring Sri Lankans at Northampton in 2002. In the same season, he made his senior debut for Hampshire in a List A one-day match against Surrey in the Norwich Union League, with Adams making three appearances in the competition; he also made his County Championship debut at the end of the season, playing against Sussex and Surrey.

Adams' time at Loughborough coincided with Loughborough UCCE being afforded first-class status, and was appointed their captain for the 2003 Season. He played in Loughborough's inaugural first-class match against Somerset, scoring his maiden first-class century (107 runs). He played two further matches for Loughborough and one for the British Universities against the touring Zimbabweans. After finishing his semester at Loughborough, Adams appeared regularly for Hampshire as Derek Kenway's opening partner in the latter part of the 2003 County Championship. His innings of 60 in the first innings of their final Championship match of the season against Derbyshire was a key component in their total of 580 all out, and eventual 10 wickets victory that helped Hampshire avoid finishing bottom of the Championship for only the second time in their history. He played three first-class matches for Loughborough in 2004, though was replaced as captain by David Wigley. He also played for the British Universities against the touring New Zealanders. Having completed his studies at Loughborough, Adams was available to play in the latter half of the 2004 County Championship, making eight appearances. He also made three one-day appearances in the 2004 Totesport League.

In 2005, Adams featured in eight matches in the County Championship, scoring 310 runs and making three half centuries. Hampshire won the Cheltenham & Gloucester Trophy, but he did not feature in any of Hampshire's matches in the competition; his only one-day appearance came in the totesport League. He made his Twenty20 debut in the 2005 Twenty20 Cup against Middlesex, with Adams making six appearances in the competition. Adams played as Michael Carberry's opening partner during the 2006 season. He played in all sixteen of Hampshire's matches in the 2006 County Championship, passing a thousand runs (1,173) at an average of 45.11 for the season. Against Yorkshire at Headingley in June, Adams scored his first Championship century with an unbeaten 168 runs in Hampshire's successful fourth innings chase of 404 runs, that was achieved largely on the final day. The following month, he scored an unbeaten 262 runs against Nottinghamshire in an innings that lasted over 10 hours and contained 34 boundaries. he was awarded his county cap following the match. His appearances for Hampshire in 2006 were limited to first-class cricket, with the exception of a single one-day appearance in the Cheltenham & Gloucester Trophy.

=== Establishing himself ===
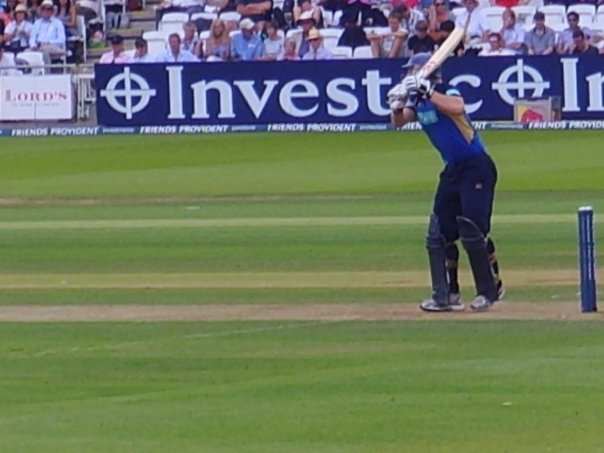
Adams (pictured) prepares to face a delivery in the final of the 2009 Friends Provident Trophy at Lord's

Adams played 11 matches in the 2007 County Championship, scoring 773 runs at an average of 40.68, making one century and five half centuries. Midway through the season, the opening partnership of Michael Brown and Carberry was preferred, and he found himself out of the Championship team between June and August. He made six one-day and five T20 appearances in 2007. Prior to the 2008 season, Adams agreed to play minor counties one-day cricket for Dorset, coached by Alan Willows, who had been his coach at Sherborne. He sought to use the opportunity to improve his chances of playing more for Hampshire in one-day cricket; he played once against Wales Minor Counties in the MCCA Knockout Trophy, and later in the season he played a three-day match against Wiltshire in the Minor Counties Championship. He struggled for form in the County Championship, and was dropped after five matches. He returned later in the season to play two further matches, ending the season with 206 runs at an average of 17.16. He achieved his aim of appearing more in the one-day side, making nine appearances, his most at the time. He had greater success in one-day cricket, scoring 266 runs at an average of exactly 38. He made scores of 86 runs in a five wicket victory against Somerset and 90 runs in a 62 runs victory against Durham, both in the Pro40. He considered his struggles around this time to be due to a loss of his trigger movements at the crease when facing a delivery, with Adams concerned that his poor form could result in Hampshire releasing him.

However, Adams was retained, signing a new two-year deal in February 2009. He returned to form in 2009, having received coaching in Australia in the winter to improve his batting. He passed a thousand runs in a season for the second time, scoring 1,350 at an average of 51.92 from 17 matches. He made ten half-centuries and three centuries, including 147 runs against Somerset in August, ending the season as Hampshire's leading run-scorer in the County Championship. He made 13 appearances in one-day cricket, scoring 575 runs at an average of 47.91, making six half centuries. He played key roles in both the semi-final and final of the 2009 Friends Provident Trophy. In their 64 runs semi-final victory against Lancashire, he scored 78 runs and shared in an opening stand of 159 runs with Michael Lumb, and in their 6 wickets victory against Sussex in the final at Lord's, he scored 55 runs and put on 93 runs for the first wicket with Lumb. He played 11 matches in the Twenty20 Cup, scoring 174 runs at an average of 17.40, scoring his first half-century in the format, an unbeaten 68 runs against Sussex.

=== England Lions selection ===
Adams passed 1,000 first-class runs once more in 2010, scoring 1,351 runs at an average of 48.25 from 16 matches. His season was characterised by innings where he batted for prolonged periods. In Hampshire's opening County Championship match against Essex, he made 169 runs, batting for 8 hours. Later in the season, he helped secure a draw against Yorkshire, batting for 428 minutes and making 196 runs from 343 balls in Hampshire's second innings, and established a Hampshire record-partnership for the fourth wicket of 278 runs with James Vince. In the following match against Lancashire, he batted for 10 hours and 35 minutes, making 194 runs in a defeat. His Championship form led to speculation he could be called up to England's Test team, with Alastair Cook struggling for form. Adams scored maiden one-day and T20 centuries during the season. He made 131 runs against Warwickshire in the Clydesdale Bank 40, sharing in a partnership of 168 runs for the second wicket with Carberry. In 11 one-day appearances, he scored 496 runs at an average of 49.60. In Hampshire's Twenty20 Cup winning campaign, he made two unbeaten centuries, scoring 101 runs against Surrey and 100 runs against Glamorgan; he was the leading run-scorer in the tournament, with 668 at an average of 39.29.

Following the 2010 season, Adams signed to play T20 cricket for Auckland in the 2010–11 HRV Cup, making ten appearances. He scored 232 runs at an average of exactly 29 in the tournament; his highest score, 62 runs off 43 balls, came against Central Districts in Auckland's 4 runs victory in the final. He played for Hampshire during their guest participation in the West Indian Caribbean Twenty20, and remained in the West Indies with the England Lions team that took part in the first-class West Indian Regional Four Day Competition in February–March 2011. He made six appearances, scoring 399 runs at an average of 39.90, top-scoring with 142 runs against Combined Campuses and Colleges; in the 2011 season, he would be selected to play for the England Lions in a first-class match against the touring Sri Lankans. He scored 950 runs at an average of 33.92 from 16 first-class appearances in 2011, making the second double century of his career (207 runs) against Somerset, a match in which he deputsied as captain. The match was also notable for Adams and Carberry establishing a Hampshire record partnership for the second wicket of 373 runs, which remains as of 2026. He scored 297 runs at an average of 37.12 from nine one-day matches that year, with one century. He made 17 appearances in the Twenty20 Cup, with Hampshire reaching finals day, where they were defeated by Somerset in the semi-final. He scored 319 runs in the tournament, though failed to record any scores above fifty. In October, Adams played for Auckland in the 2011 Champions League Twenty20 in India, playing in both their group-stage defeats.

=== Hampshire captaincy ===
Prior to the 2012 season, Adams signed a one-year contract extension with Hampshire. With Mascarenhas injured for much of the 2012 season, he assumed the captaincy in the County Championship and one-day cricket; he was the first Hampshire-born player to captain the county since the Second World War. He scored over a thousand first-class runs for the fourth time in 2012, with 1,024 at an average of 48.76. He made 149 runs in Hampshire's successful fourth innings chase of 326 runs against Northamptonshire in the County Championship in August, sharing in century partnerships with Simon Katich and Neil MacKenzie. Hampshire secured a limited overs double in 2012, winning both the Clydesdale Bank 40 and the Twenty20 Cup. He made 13 one-day appearances, scoring 333 runs. His highest score came against Warwickshire in the final of the Clydesdale Bank 40, with Adams making 66 runs from 70 balls, earning him man-of-the-match; although the match was tied at 244 runs apiece, Hampshire won by losing fewer wickets. Remarking on his captaincy in the match, the cricket journalist Scyld Berry wrote in The Daily Telegraph that he "kept his cool at the climax" when choosing which bowlers he would use for the final overs of Warwickshire's chase. He scored 195 runs from 11 matches in the 2012 Twenty20 Cup, but did not make any scores over fifty. He top-scored in the final against Yorkshire, making 43 runs in Hampshire's 10 runs victory. He later played in the 2012 Champions League Twenty20 in South Africa, playing in both of Hampshire's group-stage defeats.

In December 2012, Adams signed a further contract extension, keeping him at Hampshire until 2015. Prior to the start of the 2013 season, he played a first-class match for the Marylebone Cricket Club against Warwickshire in Abu Dhabi. He continued to captain Hampshire the County Championship and one-day cricket in 2013, with Mascarenhas captaining the T20 side. In the County Championship, he scored 883 runs at an average of 39.66 from 16 matches, making two double-centuries. The first, an unbeaten 219 runs, came against Worcestershire in April. It was the highest post-war first-class score by a Hampshire captain, and was the highest since Dick Moore's 316 runs in 1937. In a draw against Northamptonshire in September, he made 218 runs in 574 minutes. Despite these scores, he struggled with consistency, recording six ducks in the County Championship. In the Yorkshire Bank 40, he scored 519 runs at an average 51.90 from 13 matches, making five half-centuries. Hampshire reached finals day in the Twenty20 Cup for successive seasons, losing to Surrey in the semi-final. Adams scored 210 runs from 12 matches in the competition, did not score any half-centuries, and averaged below 20 for the first time since 2009.

Adams remained captain in the County Championship and One-Day Cup, with Vince assuming the T20 captaincy following Mascarenhas' retirement. He led Hampshire to promotion from the Second Division of the County Championship. In 16 Championship matches, he scored 1,215 runs at an average of 43.39, making eight half-centuries and one double-century. This came against Leicestershire in September, with Adams scoring 231 runs in Hampshire's first innings and sharing in an opening stand of 253 with Carberry. He passed 10,000 first-class during the season. In contrast to their Championship form, the county finished bottom of their group in the One-Day Cup, with Adams scoring 258 runs and averaging exactly 43. In the T20 Blast, he scored 447 runs at an average of 29.80, making four half centuries — his first in the format since the 2010–11 New Zealand season. He was afforded a benefit year in 2015, raising £35,000 for Parkinson's UK. Adams struggled for form at the beginning of the 2015 County Championship, averaging 29.15 by mid-July. He temporarily stepped-down as captain on 18 July to concentrate on finding form with the bat, with Vince taking over the captaincy in all formats. He ended the season with 836 runs at an average of 28.93, scoring one century. His one-day form in 2015 contrasted with his first-class, with scoring 348 runs at an average of exactly 58 from eight appearances in the 2015 One-Day Cup. Their quarter-final defeat to Gloucestershire was Adams' 100th List A appearance, with him narrowly missing out on a century, scoring 97 runs. In Hampshire's run to finals day in the T20 Blast, Adams scored 152 runs from ten appearances, making one half century.

=== Retirement ===
In October 2015, Adams permanently relinquished the County Championship and one-day captaincies to Vince. He injured his ankle in a pre-season net session in Barbados, missing the first two matches of the 2016 County Championship, with illness in July causing him to miss some matches. In 14 Championship matches, he scored 897 runs at an average of 35.88, making eight half centuries. His seven appearances in the One-Day Cup yielded him 221 runs at an average of 31.57. On his return from illness against Sussex at the end of July, Adams scored 92 runs from 97 balls, contributing to Hampshire's victory by 9 runs in the One-Day Cup. He made six appearances in the T20 Blast, the last of his career. In the 2017 season Adams made 12 appearances in the County Championship, scoring 580 runs at an average of 30.52, with two centuries. The first, a score of 166 runs, came against Warwickshire in June. After Hampshire had suffered a top-order collapse, Adams and Sean Ervine established a record fourth wicket partnership for the county of 367 runs, surpassing the previous record set by Adams and Vince in 2010. His second, a score of 144 runs, came against Surrey in July. He made only two one-day appearances in the One-Day Cup in 2017. Following the season, he was voted Clubman of the Year, for his contributions to Hampshire cricket on and off the field. He also signed a one-year contract extension in November.

During the winter, he played one-day cricket for Hampshire when they were invited to play in the West Indian Regional Super50. He played in all eight of Hampshire's fixtures, scoring 285 runs at an average of 40.71; he was Hampshire's leading run-scorer. In the 2018 season, he 764 runs at an average of 31.83 from fifteen first-class matches, making two centuries against Cardiff MCCU (182 not out) and Yorkshire (147). In the One-Day Cup, he scored 142 runs from seven matches, averaging 28.40. In early September, Adams announced his retirement, stating that he wanted to make way for other members of the squad to play.

=== Playing style and statistics ===
A left-hander, Cricinfo described Adams as a "dedicated and selfless opening batsman". He possessed a classical batting technique, and had good levels of awareness and concentration, allowing him to construct an innings whilst assessing the bowling, pitch, and conditions. He was good at driving the ball, and took advantage of any short deliveries by cutting and pulling. The cricket journalist Freddie Wilde observed that Adams began his career as "a red-ball player first and white-ball second", but as his career progressed he became more adept in limited-overs cricket by increasing his rate of scoring and adding new shots to his repertoire. His evolution into a T20 batsman led Wilde to remark that Adams "was an unlikely batting leader of a T20 dynasty" during Hampshire's T20 success between 2010 and 2015.

In first-class cricket, Adams made 233 appearances, scoring 14,135 runs at an average of 37.29; for Hampshire, he made 216 first-class appearances, scoring 13,298 runs at an average of 37.88. 23 of his 25 centuries and 70 of his 73 fifties came for the county. In 123 one-day appearances, all for Hampshire, Adams scored 4,032 runs at an average of 39.52, making 30 half-centuries and two centuries. He made 135 T20 appearances, scoring 2,643 runs at an average of 24.02, making nine fifties alongside his two centuries. His 2,393 runs for Hampshire is the fourth-highest aggregate for the county in the format. Across all formats, Adams made 462 appearances for Hampshire, scoring nearly 20,000 runs. Alongside Carberry and Vince, he formed one of the most potent T20 batting partnerships in T20 cricket. ESPNcricinfo described him as a "brilliant fielder", with Adams taking 275 catches across all formats. A part-time left-arm medium pace bowler, he took 13 wickets at first-class level.

== Coaching career ==
Adams joined the Hampshire Second XI as a coach in February 2019. In June 2025, he deputised for Adrian Birrell as Hampshire's head-coach for the One-Day Cup, with Hampshire reaching the final. With Birrell standing down at the end of the 2025 season, there was speculation that Adams would succeed him. Birrell was succeeded by Russell Domingo, with Adams staying on to assist him as batting coach. Adams coached in the Big Bash League (BBL) in Australia for the Hobart Hurricanes, doing so in the 2024–25 and 2025–26 BBL's.

Sporting positions
Preceded by Dimitri Mascarenhas	Hampshire cricket captain 2013–2015	Succeeded by James Vince
