= James Bruce (English cricketer) =

English cricketer (born 1979)

Personal information
- Full name: James Thomas Anthony Bruce
- Born: 17 December 1979 (age 46); Hammersmith, London, England
- Nickname: Brucey
- Height: 6 ft 1 in (1.85 m)
- Batting: Right-handed
- Bowling: Right-arm medium-fast

Domestic team information
- Years: Team
- 2001–2007: Hampshire (squad no. 27)

Career statistics
Competition	FC	LA	T20
Matches	49	31	20
Runs scored	243	76	30
Batting average	7.14	12.66	7.50
100s/50s	–/–	–/–	–/–
Top score	32	19*	11*
Balls bowled	6,905	1,232	288
Wickets	124	44	15
Bowling average	34.07	22.18	26.06
5 wickets in innings	3	–	–
10 wickets in match	–	–	–
Best bowling	5/43	4/18	3/20
Catches/stumpings	14/–	9/–	11/–
- Source: Cricinfo, 22 January 2009

James Thomas Anthony Bruce (born 17 December 1979) is an English former cricketer who played for Hampshire.

== Cricket career ==
Bruce was born at Hammersmith in December 1979. He was educated at Eton College, before matriculating to Durham University. While studying at Durham, Bruce made his debut in first-class cricket for Durham UCCE against Durham in 2001. He played first-class cricket for Durham UCCE until 2002, making six appearances. Bruce was signed by Hampshire ahead of the 2003 season, making his debut for the county in a first-class match against Oxford UCCE. He went onto make seven appearances in the 2003 County Championship, alongside three List A one-day appearances in the 2003 ECB National League. In his first season of county cricket, he took 19 first-class wickets at an average of 43.63. In 2004 and 2005, played four first-class matches in each season, and did not feature in one-day cricket in 2004; he did, however, make his debut in Twenty20 cricket in the 2004 Twenty20 Cup, in which he featured in six matches during the tournament. The following season he featured in seven matches in the Twenty20 Cup, alongside four one-day appearances in the totesport League.

Bruce was entrusted with the new ball in the 2006 County Championship, beginning the season by finding good form. In June, he claimed his maiden five wicket haul with 5 for 43 to guide Hampshire to a 299 runs victory against Nottinghamshire. His good form also carried over into one-day cricket, with Bruce taking 4 for 18 in Hampshire's 62 runs victory over Gloucestershire in the Cheltenham & Gloucester Trophy. During the 2006 season, Bruce took 38 wickets from thirteen matches at an average of 29.18, whilst in one-day cricket he took 21 wickets at an average of 14.95. In the 2007 County Championship, he made fourteen appearances, taking 39 wickets at an average of 30.74, claiming two five wicket hauls. He also made ten one-day and seven Twenty20 matches that season.

Bruce announced his retirement in February 2008, in order to pursue a job in the City of London, having spent the previous three winters gaining work experience there. Commenting after his retirement, then Hampshire team manager Paul Terry noted that "in the right conditions, he has become one of the better English-born bowlers." In 43 first-class matches for Hampshire, he took 119 wickets at an average of 32.23, while in one-day cricket he took 44 wickets at an average of 22.18 from thirty matches. In Twenty20 cricket, he took 15 wickets from twenty matches at an average of 26.06, with best figures of 3 for 20.
