= Dimitri Mascarenhas =

English cricketer (born 1977)

Personal information
- Full name: Adrian Dimitri Mascarenhas
- Born: 30 October 1977 (age 49); Chiswick, London, England
- Nickname: Dimi
- Height: 6 ft 1 in (1.85 m)
- Batting: Right-handed
- Bowling: Right-arm medium-fast

International information
- National side: England (2007–2009)
- ODI debut (cap 203): 1 July 2007 v West Indies
- Last ODI: 17 September 2009 v Australia
- ODI shirt no.: 32
- T20I debut (cap 25): 28 June 2007 v West Indies
- Last T20I: 14 June 2009 v India
- T20I shirt no.: 32

Domestic team information
- Years: Team
- 1996: Dorset
- 1996–2013: Hampshire (squad no. 17)
- 2008–2010: Rajasthan Royals (squad no. 32)
- 2008/09–2011/12: Otago (squad no. 17)
- 2012–2013: Kings XI Punjab (squad no. 17)
- 2012/13: Wellington
- 2012/13: Melbourne Stars (squad no. 17)
- 2012/13: Rangpur Riders (squad no. 17)
- 2013/14: Hobart Hurricanes (squad no. 17)

Career statistics
Competition	ODI	T20I	FC	LA
Matches	20	14	195	268
Runs scored	245	123	6,495	4,407
Batting average	22.27	15.37	25.07	24.89
100s/50s	0/1	0/0	8/23	0/27
Top score	52	31	131	79
Balls bowled	822	252	28,331	11,373
Wickets	13	12	450	309
Bowling average	48.76	25.75	28.22	26.35
5 wickets in innings	0	0	17	2
10 wickets in match	0	0	0	0
Best bowling	3/23	3/18	6/25	5/27
Catches/stumpings	4/–	7/–	76/–	66/–
- Source: Cricinfo, 31 March 2024

Adrian Dimitri Mascarenhas (born 30 October 1977) is an English former cricketer who played One Day International (ODI) and Twenty20 International (T20I) cricket for England, and county cricket for Hampshire. From a Bharatha Sri Lankan family, Mascarenhas was born in England in Chiswick, London. His family emigrated to Australia when he was a child, where he was educated at Trinity College, Perth. While playing club cricket, he came to the attention of English cricketer Paul Terry, who arranged for him to play cricket in England. After a single appearance in minor counties cricket for Dorset, Mascarenhas made his senior debut for Hampshire in 1996, aged 18; he would play for the county until 2013, making 195 first-class, 237 one-day and 74 Twenty20 (T20) appearances. He captained them between 2008 and 2013, leading the team to one-day success in 2009 and to a T20 title in 2012; in these formats he excelled as an attacking all-rounder. In 2008, he became the first English cricketer to play in the Indian Premier League; he would go on to play domestic T20 cricket for eight teams in five countries.

Having been overlooked in limited-overs cricket by England for several years, Mascarenhas made both his ODI and T20I debuts in 2007 against the West Indies. In that year, he established the record for the most runs in an over in an ODI for England, with 30, scored against Yuvraj Singh when playing against India. He played for England until 2009, participating in both the 2007 and 2009 World Twenty20 tournaments. Having failed to recover from injury, he retired following the 2013 English season, moving into coaching. Mascarenhas coached the New Zealand first-class team Otago in 2014, and in 2015 he was appointed New Zealand's bowling coach. After leaving that role in 2016, he was assistant coach of Essex in 2018 and Middlesex's T20 bowling coach in 2019 and 2020.

== Early life ==
Adrian Dimitri Mascarenhas was born in Chiswick, London, on 30 October 1977 to Malik Mascarenhas and his wife, Pauline (née de Croos), both from the Bharatha community of Negombo in Sri Lanka. His father played cricket in his youth for St. Mary's College in Negombo. They had emigrated to England in 1976, and when he was a child his parents emigrated again to Melbourne in Australia. There, he played cricket at under-12 level for Ringwood, before the family relocated to Perth. His father ran a chain of successful fast-food restaurants, affording Mascarenhas the opportunity to be privately educated at Trinity College, Perth. At Trinity, Simon Katich, who was two years his senior, attempted unsuccessfully to get Mascarenhas in the college cricket team at the age of 14. Mascarenhas played club cricket for Melville. He captained Western Australia at both under-17 and -19 levels, and hoped to play for Australia. During the 1995–96 season, the Hampshire batsman Paul Terry joined Melville as their overseas player. He was instrumental in finding Mascarenhas and his Melville teammate, Chris Rogers, club opportunities in England in 1996.

== Cricket career ==
=== Early years ===
In England, Mascarenhas joined Bournemouth and helped them win the 1996 Southern Cricket League. He played minor counties cricket for Dorset that year, making one appearance, against Cornwall in the Minor Counties Championship; he took bowling figures of 7 wickets (a metonymic term for dismissing a batsman) for 64 runs in Cornwall's first innings. He began playing for the Hampshire second team in the season, and made his first-team debut, aged 18, against Middlesex in a List A one-day match (Note: First-class cricket matches are multi-day games played over three or four days at domestic level; both teams play a maximum of two innings that consist of an unrestricted number of overs. List A matches are limited-overs games scheduled to last one day; in the modern game, they are restricted to one 50-over innings per team. Twenty20 matches are limited-overs games scheduled to last around three hours; each team is restricted to one 20-over innings.) in the Axa Equity & Law League at the start of September. Two days after his debut in the one-day format, Mascarenhas made his first-class debut against Glamorgan at the County Ground in Southampton in the County Championship, taking 6 wickets for 88 runs in Glamorgan's first innings, the best bowling figures by a Hampshire debutant since Charlie Llewellyn's 8 for 132 in 1899. A second Championship appearance followed, against Kent, with Mascarenhas taking 16 wickets in his first two matches. He was offered a two-year contract by Hampshire at the end of the season. He suffered a back injury in the 1997 season, limiting him to six first-class and one-day appearances.

Mascarenhas was overlooked for the first County Championship match of the 1998 season, but thereafter played in all of Hampshire's first-class and one-day matches. In 17 first-class appearances, he took 30 wickets at a bowling average (the number of runs a bowler concedes per wicket taken) of 33.33, and scored 645 runs at a batting average (the total number of runs a player scores divided by the number of times they have been out) of 28.04, making six half-centuries. His 63 runs in the second innings against Leicestershire in May helped Hampshire avoid an innings defeat, having shared in a partnership of 114 runs with Adrian Aymes for the fifth wicket in their first innings. He made 26 appearances in one-day cricket, taking 22 wickets at 19.86; he also scored 560 runs at an average of 28, making five half-centuries. In the semi-final of the NatWest Trophy against Lancashire he demonstrated his all-round abilities, being adjudged man of the match for his 73 runs and 3 wickets for 28; despite his efforts, Hampshire lost the match. He was awarded his county cap in August, and voted Hampshire's Player of the Year in November.

Mascarenhas's back problems arose again midway through the 1999 season, keeping him out of the team for parts of June and August. Across the season he made 14 first-class appearances, scoring 465 runs at 28.83; he struggled with his bowling, taking 17 wickets at a high average of 51.05. In one-day cricket, he scored 319 runs from 18 appearances, making three half-centuries. In contrast to his first-class form, Mascarenhas took 21 wickets in one-day cricket, averaging 26.42 runs per wicket.

=== Established all-rounder ===
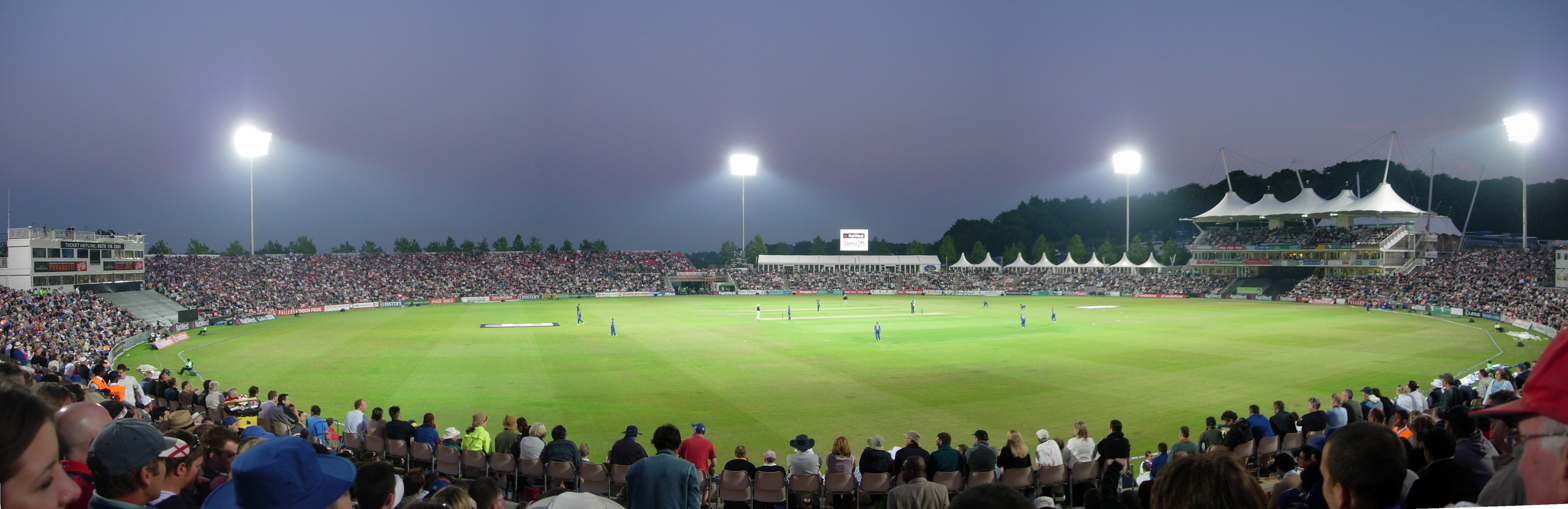
Mascarenhas scored the first century at the Rose Bowl (pictured) in the 2001 County Championship.

Mascarenhas made his first century in first-class cricket in the 2000 County Championship, scoring 100 runs from 171 balls against Derbyshire. He scored 473 runs in 16 first-class matches in 2000, and took 28 wickets at 28.42. In one-day cricket, his figures of 4 for 25 against Middlesex guided Hampshire to the semi-final of the NatWest Trophy, and from 24 one-day matches he averaged 21.18 for his 38 wickets; he was second in Hampshire's one-day bowling aggregate, one behind Shane Warne. Prior to the start of 2001 season, he underwent surgery for an ankle injury. In that season, Hampshire moved from the County Ground in Southampton to their newly constructed home at the Rose Bowl in West End. Mascarenhas scored the first ever century at the ground against Worcestershire in the 2001 County Championship. He scored 447 runs from 15 first-class appearances in 2001. He also took 40 wickets at 25.37, with two five-wicket hauls; against Derbyshire in July he claimed 6 for 60, securing a one-wicket victory for Hampshire. In 20 one-day matches, he claimed 24 wickets at 25.66, and scored 236 runs, including one fifty. He bowled throughout the season with a heel spur, which was operated on after the season. He recuperated in Perth in the winter and played for Melville in grade cricket, the top level of club cricket in Western Australia.

Mascarenhas took 37 wickets at 30.83 from 16 first-class appearances in 2002, taking five wickets against Yorkshire in a County Championship match in May. He also scored 574 runs, with a top score of 94 runs against Surrey. He played in 20 one-day matches, averaging 19.76 for his 32 wickets; he took his first five-wicket haul in one-day cricket in a 46-run victory against Gloucestershire in the Norwich Union League, and ended the season as Hampshire's leading wicket-taker in one-day cricket. Mascarenhas made 17 first-class appearances in the 2003 season, scoring 600 runs at an average of 25. He made an unbeaten century against Glamorgan in the County Championship in April. Later in the season, he made 92 runs against Durham, forming a partnership of 123 runs for the eighth wicket with Shaun Udal. He took 40 first-class wickets at 32.17, with his best figures being 6 for 55 against Northamptonshire. He took 39 one-day wickets during the season, the joint-highest nationally with Graham Napier. In June, he featured in Hampshire's first-ever Twenty20 (T20) match, against Sussex at Southampton in the Twenty20 Cup; Mascarenhas played five matches in the competition's inaugural edition.

In 16 first-class appearances in 2004, Mascarenhas scored 477 runs, making one century against Durham in the County Championship. He claimed 50 first-class wickets in a season for the first time, with 56 at 18.67; he took five or more wickets four times, with career-best figures of 6 for 25 against Derbyshire. He ended the season as Hampshire's leading first-class wicket-taker. In one-day cricket, he took 12 wickets from 15 appearances, and scored 413 runs at 37.54, including four half-centuries. In July 2004 against Sussex, he became the first player to take three wickets in three consecutive balls in T20 cricket when he dismissed Mark Davis, Mushtaq Ahmed and Jason Lewry; his 5 for 14 from 3 overs (Note: An over consists of six legitimate balls delivered by the bowler.) and 5 balls included two maidens. Mascarenhas played for England in the Hong Kong Sixes competition after the season, helping to retain their title. In the 2005 season, he achieved his highest first-class batting average, 49.09, with an aggregate of 540 runs from 11 matches; he made two centuries, against Warwickshire (102 not out) and Nottinghamshire (103 not out). In the former, he shared a seventh-wicket partnership of 324 runs with Shane Watson, and in the latter he helped Hampshire to an innings-and-188-run victory, securing a second-place finish in the County Championship. He took 34 first-class wickets at 23.55, with two five-wicket hauls. His Championship appearances were limited by a back injury sustained in a match in May, keeping him out throughout June. He played for Hampshire in the final of the Cheltenham & Gloucester Trophy at Lord's in September, where they defeated Warwickshire. In 14 one-day matches, he scored 254 runs and took 14 wickets.

=== International debut ===
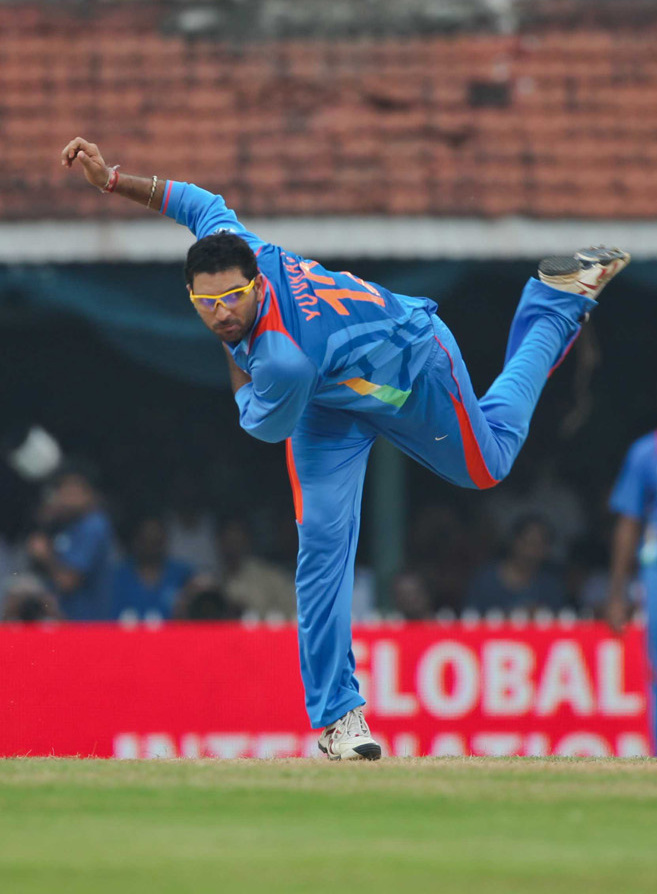
Mascarenhas hit five consecutive sixes against Yuvraj Singh (pictured) in a One Day International in 2007.

Mascarenhas played 16 first-class matches in 2006, scoring 474 runs; he made one century against Kent, a score of 131 runs, the highest of his career. He also took 43 wickets at 24.97. In August, he was reprimanded by the England and Wales Cricket Board (ECB) for breaching the disciplinary code in relating to "abuse of the ground, equipment or fixtures and fittings" in a County Championship match against Warwickshire. In 16 one-day appearances, he scored 336 runs at an average of 30.54, and took 11 wickets. In eight Twenty20 Cup appearances, he scored 127 runs with a highest score of 42 not out, and took 9 wickets, including a match-winning 4 for 23 against Sussex. Warne, Hampshire's club captain, publicly highlighted Mascarenhas's abilities and called for him to be selected for the England One Day International (ODI) team. On 13 September 2006 Warne wrote in The Times: "It amazes me that England have never given him a chance in the one-day side. He is the best finisher with the bat in all situations in the country and his bowling is clever and accurate".

Mascarenhas scored 489 runs at 34.92 from ten appearances in the 2007 County Championship, and took 15 wickets at 32.06. In one-day cricket, he played an important role in the semi-final of the Friends Provident Trophy against Warwickshire in June, forming a seventh-wicket partnership of 54 runs with Nic Pothas to take them to victory. Following this, he was selected in England's squad for their ODI and Twenty20 International (T20I) series against the West Indies. Mascarenhas credited Warne's influence for his selection. He made his ODI debut against the West Indies at Lord's on 1 July 2007, playing all three ODIs and both T20Is in the series. He played in the ODI series against India in August to September, participating in four of the seven matches. In the 6th ODI, played at The Oval, he hit five consecutive sixes from the final five balls bowled by Yuvraj Singh. His 3 for 23 off 10 overs in the 7th ODI helped England to a 4–3 series victory; the cricket writer Martin Williamson described his bowling as "impossible" to score from. On the same day, he was selected to replace the injured Ryan Sidebottom in England's squad for the 2007 World Twenty20. He played all five of England's matches in the tournament, taking 3 for 18 in a group-stage victory over Zimbabwe. He was appointed Hampshire's T20 captain in 2007, but his international selection limited him to two T20 appearances for the county. He was afforded a benefit year with Hampshire in 2007, with a friendly match played at Andover in June raising £8,000 toward his benefit fund.

In January 2008, Mascarenhas was selected in England's ODI and T20I squads for their winter tour of New Zealand. He played in both T20I matches that preceded the ODI leg of the tour. In the first, he scored 31 runs from 14 balls, hitting four consecutive sixes from Jeetan Patel's bowling, and took 2 for 19 from 4 overs. This all-round performance earned him man of the match in England's 32-run victory. He did not feature in the first two ODIs, but played in the final three, going wicketless and scoring 29 runs in total.

=== Participation in T20 leagues ===
Following Warne's retirement at the end of the 2007 season, Mascarenhas was appointed Hampshire captain. In March 2008, he signed for the Rajasthan Royals in the newly formed Indian Premier League (IPL), becoming the first English player to join the league. In April 2008, the ECB decided not to allow centrally-contracted England players to play in the IPL; at the time, Mascarenhas was not centrally contracted and was the only English representative in the tournament, having made one appearance, against the Delhi Daredevils. As a result of his IPL commitment, he missed several matches for Hampshire. After leaving the IPL, he made 15 first-class appearances for the county, captaining them to third place in the County Championship. His aggregate of 673 runs was the highest of his first-class career, and he also took 41 wickets at 23.82. In one-day cricket, he led Hampshire to being runners-up in the Pro40; he achieved his highest one-day batting average (46.16), having scored 277 runs from 13 matches, and took 15 wickets. When New Zealand toured England in the summer of 2008, he played one ODI and one T20I in the series.

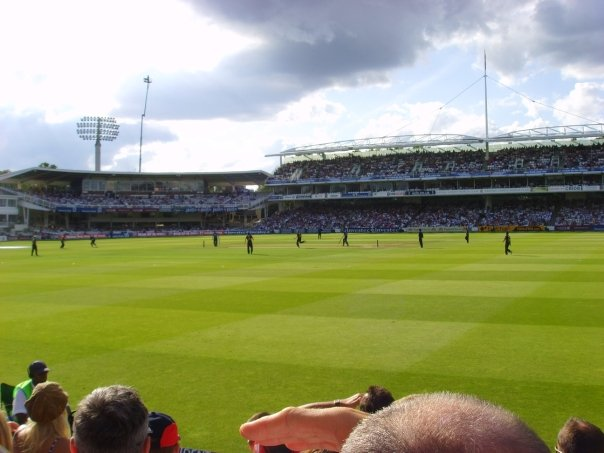
Mascarenhas played in Hampshire's victory in the 2009 Friends Provident Trophy final at Lord's (match in progress pictured).

Following the 2008 season, Mascarenhas captained England in their Hong Kong Sixes winning campaign, before playing domestic limited-overs cricket in New Zealand for Otago. He made ten appearances in the 2008–09 State Shield, scoring an unbeaten 75 against Auckland that saw him hit five consecutive sixes from Daryl Tuffey's bowling. He made seven appearances in Otago's State Twenty20 winning campaign, and played for them in the 2009 Champions League Twenty20. Mascarenhas toured the West Indies with England in the winter. He played all five ODI matches in England's 3–2 victory, scoring a total of 65 runs across the series and taking five wickets at an average of 30.40, and played in the only T20I at Port of Spain. Mascarenhas had missed the start of the 2009 English season due to his IPL commitments with the Rajasthan Royals, with Pothas deputising as captain. Returning to Hampshire, he made ten appearances in the County Championship, scoring his final first-class century (108 runs) against Lancashire. He led the county to the final of the Friends Provident Trophy at Lord's, where they defeated Sussex by six wickets. He also captained them to the quarter-final of the Twenty20 Cup, playing in seven of their ten matches; his total of 153 runs in the competition was the most he would make in an edition of the Twenty20 Cup. In May, he was included in England's fifteen-man squad for the 2009 World Twenty20, playing three matches in the tournament. Later in the season, following an injury to Luke Wright, he played in the final two matches of the ODI series against Australia.

Mascarenhas played for the Rajasthan Royals in the 2010 IPL season, but injured his Achilles tendon in his second match, against the Delhi Daredevils, forcing him to return home. As a result of this injury, he missed the start of the English season and was ruled out of the 2010 World Twenty20, having been named in the initial 30-man squad. His first game back in England was against Kent in the Friends Provident t20 in June, bowling three overs before a recurrence of his injury forced him from the field. He was ruled out of playing for the remainder of the season, with Dominic Cork and Pothas deputising in the captaincy. In September 2010, Mascarenhas posted an expletive-laden tweet about Geoff Miller, England's chairman of selectors, claiming to have been ignored by Miller at a match and expressing his frustration that his in-form teammate James Adams had not been considered for selection. As a result of the tweet, he was banned by the ECB for 14 days at the start of the 2011 English season, and fined £1,000 by Hampshire and £500 by the ECB. Mascarenhas issued an apology to Miller, stating that the tweet did not reflect his views about him.

Mascarenhas was bought by the Kings XI Punjab franchise during the IPL auction in January 2011 for $100,000, but was replaced by David Miller after struggling to recover from the Achilles injury sustained in 2010. He had recovered from the injury by May 2011, playing his first match of the 2011 season in the Clydesdale Bank 40 against Durham. He made eight appearances in the County Championship, taking the last five-wicket haul of his first-class career (6 for 62) against Durham. He played both one-day and T20 cricket for Hampshire in 2011, taking 21 wickets at 16.23 in the Twenty20 Cup. For the majority of the season, he nursed a shoulder injury. Following the season, he played for Otago in the 2011–12 HRV Cup, making eight appearances. He scored a total of 124 runs, opened the batting in some matches, but took only three wickets, averaging 50. His participation in the 2012 IPL caused him to miss the start of the 2012 English season. Playing for the Kings XI Punjab in the competition, he made four appearances; against Pune Warriors India, he took 5 for 25 in a seven-wicket win. Mascarenhas captained Hampshire to the 2012 Twenty20 Cup title, taking 15 wickets at 16.46 from 11 matches; he played in the latter part of the tournament with torn shoulder tendons. He made just five first-class and six one-day appearances in 2012, with the captaincy in Championship and one-day cricket passing to Adams.

Following the 2012 season, Mascarenhas captained Hampshire in the Champions League Twenty20, where they lost to both the Sialkot Stallions and Auckland in the qualifying group stage. He was critical of the pitch in the aftermath of their defeat to Auckland at Centurion, calling it "no good for 20-over cricket". He spent the winter playing T20 franchise cricket for several teams. He played twice in New Zealand for Wellington in the 2012–13 HRV Cup, before playing twice in Australia for the Melbourne Stars as a replacement for Lasith Malinga, who was on international duty. He then played three matches for the newly formed Rangpur Riders in the 2012–13 Bangladesh Premier League, before making one appearance in the 2013 Indian Premier League for the Kings XI Punjab against Sunrisers Hyderabad. Later remarking on why he played just once, Mascarenhas proffered that their coach Darren Lehmann "did not really rate me".

=== Retirement ===
In the 2013 English season, Mascarenhas made one first-class appearance in the County Championship, against Gloucestershire, but was a regular in Hampshire's one-day and T20 teams. He made 11 one-day appearances, taking 13 wickets at 24.61; he claimed his second one-day five-wicket haul with 5 for 42 in a defeat to Lancashire. He captained Hampshire to their second successive finals day (Note: In the T20 Blast, finals day consists of two semi-finals, with the winners advancing to the floodlit final played in the evening. Since 2013, finals day has been held at Edgbaston.) in the Twenty20 Cup, losing to Surrey in the semi-final. He made 11 appearances in the competition, taking 12 wickets. In July, Mascarenhas announced his intention to retire from county cricket at the end of the season, having struggled with injuries for several years, but he intended to continue playing in global T20 competitions. Writing after his retirement from county cricket, the journalist Freddie Wilde paid tribute to his captaincy, reckoning that his "crowning achievement will surely be leading Hampshire to two Friends Life t20". Wilde opined that Mascarenhas was a "valuable county servant" and that he should be remembered as a "somewhat of a revolutionary", referencing his realisation of the potential that domestic T20 leagues offered.

In September 2013, Mascarenhas signed for the Hobart Hurricanes in a playing and assistant coaching role, joining as a "local" player courtesy of his Australian passport. His participation in the 2013–14 Big Bash League was put in doubt in December, when he broke his jaw batting in a practice match; after recovering, he made four appearances in the competition, including their defeat to the Perth Scorchers in the final at the WACA Ground, which was his final professional match.

== Playing style and statistics ==
An all-rounder, Mascarenhas began his career primarily as a bowler who could also bat, and as his career progressed his skills as a batsman improved. He was a right-handed hard-hitting batsman, with Warne comparing his ability to strike the ball to that of the Australian all-rounder Ian Harvey. He was proficient at the end of an innings in one-day and T20 matches, being able to score quickly. He was also able to run quickly between the wickets, which helped to accelerate an innings. A right-arm medium-fast bowler, The Times remarked that Mascarenhas possessed the ability to use "smart and well-disguised alterations in his line and length", and he had one of the best economy rates (a measure of the runs conceded from his bowling) in county cricket. Mascarenhas credited playing alongside Warne with improving his bowling, as it made him think more about how he was going to dismiss a batsman and not just tie up an end. He was not particularly fast, delivering the ball at around 75 miles per hour (121 km/h), relying on swing (the sideways deviation of the ball through the air) to dismiss batsmen. The Daily Echo remarked that he "excelled" as a "fleet-footed fielder with a wonderful throw", and he was described as an "athletic" fielder by cricket journalist Andrew Miller.

Mascarenhas made 20 ODI appearances, scoring 245 runs at 22.27, including one fifty. His 30 runs in an over against India was an ODI record for England, remaining so until it was surpassed by Liam Livingstone's 32 runs against the Netherlands in 2022. He took 13 ODI wickets at an average of 48.76. In T20I cricket, he made 14 appearances. He scored 123 runs at an average of 15.37 and took 12 wickets at 25.75. In an interview for The Guardian in 2015, Mascarenhas commented that England's one-day captain Paul Collingwood did not bowl him at the correct moment in matches. In first-class cricket, Mascarenhas made 195 appearances for Hampshire. He scored 6,495 runs at 25.07, making eight centuries and 23 half-centuries. He took 450 wickets at 28.22, taking five or more wickets in an innings on 17 occasions. In the field, he held 76 catches. He scored 3,984 runs at 24.59 in 237 one-day appearances for Hampshire, making 24 half-centuries with a highest score of 79, and took 285 wickets at 25.22. Playing for eight teams in domestic T20 cricket, Mascarenhas made 116 appearances. He scored 1,233 runs at an average of 19.57 and had a strike rate of over 120. (Note: Domestic T20 batting and bowling statistics not explicitly stated as separate entities, but deduced from ESPNcricinfo player profile.) He took 140 wickets in the format, averaging 20.17. He was voted Hampshire's best-ever T20 player by their supporters in May 2022, having taken 94 wickets for the county.

== Coaching ==
Mascarenhas holds an ECB level-three coaching qualification. After retiring, he signed a two-year contract in June 2014 to become Otago's head coach. In June 2015, Mascarenhas became New Zealand's full-time bowling coach. He resigned from the role in February 2016, citing the need to spend more time with his family, who had relocated to Australia after his retirement. In July 2016, he was appointed coach of the Australia Under-16 cricket team. Mascarenhas joined Essex as their assistant head coach in February 2018, but left ten months later after choosing not to renew his contract. Ahead of the 2019 T20 Blast, he was appointed head T20 bowling coach at Middlesex, and prior to the 2020 T20 Blast he signed a two-year contract to continue in the role.

== Personal life ==
Mascarenhas married Nadine Taylor in Melbourne in February 2011, with Shane Warne and his partner, Liz Hurley, in attendance. Mascarenhas and Taylor have two sons: Lenny, born in 2012, and Viv, born in 2014. Mascarenhas had a close friendship with Warne. Following Warne's death in March 2022, he was one of the guest speakers at Warne's state memorial service at the Melbourne Cricket Ground. Mascarenhas is a keen golfer, claiming to have a handicap of 6 in a 2009 interview with The Times.

== Works cited ==
- Rogers, Chris (2016). Bucking the Trend. Sydney: Hardie Grant Books. ISBN 978-1-7435-8460-6.
- Wigmore, Tim; Wilde, Freddie (2019). Cricket 2.0: Inside the T20 Revolution. Edinburgh: Birlinn. ISBN 978-1-7888-5188-6.

Sporting positions
Preceded by Shane Warne	Hampshire cricket captain 2008–2013	Succeeded by James Adams
