= Jason Lewry =

English cricketer

Personal information
- Full name: Jason David Lewry
- Born: 2 April 1971 (age 55); Worthing, Sussex, England
- Height: 6 ft 3 in (1.91 m)
- Batting: Left-handed
- Bowling: Left-arm fast-medium

Domestic team information
- Years: Team
- 1994–2009: Sussex

Career statistics
| Competition | FC | LA | T20 |
|---|---|---|---|
| Matches | 187 | 79 | 11 |
| Runs scored | 1,834 | 217 | 10 |
| Batting average | 10.13 | 7.48 | 3.33 |
| 100s/50s | 0/2 | 0/0 | 0/0 |
| Top score | 72 | 16* | 8* |
| Balls bowled | 31,896 | 3,579 | 197 |
| Wickets | 621 | 100 | 14 |
| Bowling average | 27.10 | 27.68 | 17.07 |
| 5 wickets in innings | 31 | 0 | 0 |
| 10 wickets in match | 4 | 0 | 0 |
| Best bowling | 8/106 | 4/29 | 3/34 |
| Catches/stumpings | 52/– | 13/– | 4/– |
- Source: Cricinfo, 31 October 2009

Jason Lewry (born 2 April 1971) is an English former cricketer. He was a left-handed batsman and a left-arm fast-medium bowler. Born in Worthing, he played for Sussex from the beginning of his career in 1994 until his retirement in 2009, a career spanning 16 years, in spite of numerous injuries.

== Career ==
Lewry began his first-class career at Sussex in 1994, and spent his whole career with Sussex. He had been successful for Goring Cricket Club in 1993, and had also played for the Duchess of Norfolk's XI against the Marylebone Cricket Club (MCC) at Arundel Castle.

In 1996, he played for a "Rest of England" side in 1996, and was a possibility for the 1996 England A tour, until he suffered an injury—later diagnosed as a stress fracture in his back. Lewry did not bowl for 22 months, and missed the entire 1997 season.

Lewry returned to cricket in 1998, and in a match against Gloucestershire, he took a hat-trick with deliveries in two innings. He took the wicket of Mike Smith to end Gloucestershire's first innings, and then with the first two balls of their second innings, he took the wickets of Nick Trainor and Dominic Hewson, to complete his hat-trick. He took 60 Championship wickets in the season, and in 1998/99 was selected for an England A tour of South Africa and Zimbabwe. Lewry played two matches, against Zimbabwe Cricket Union President's XI, and Zimbabwe A, but was forced to return to England early, due to a troublesome shoulder that required surgery. On the tour, Lewry had also suffered knee problems and food poisoning. He never played for England teams again, and when fellow left-armer Ryan Sidebottom was chosen ahead of him for the England team in 2001, this signalled the end of his international career.

In 1999, Lewry discussed the possibility of a move with Nottinghamshire and Hampshire, but ultimately stayed at Sussex. In 2001, Lewry took seven wickets in 14 balls in a County Championship match against Hampshire. It was the best County Championship bowling since 1971, when Pat Pocock took 7 wickets in 11 balls, and in the process, Lewry became the first Sussex player for 20 years to take a hat-trick at Hove, and achieved his career-best match figures of 13–79. Lewry was given a Benefit Year by Sussex in 2002, and in 2003, Lewry took 8/106 in the County Championship title-deciding match, as Sussex won their first title. He played every Championship game in 2003, taking 42 wickets.

In 2004, Lewry was the third wicket as Dimitri Mascarenhas took the first hat-trick in Twenty20 cricket. He took 40 wickets in 2005, but missed the last six matches due to a groin injury. He returned to the side for the 2006 season, and was part of the side that won the Championship that season, and also in 2007. From 2004, Lewry played fewer List A matches, playing only seven times between 2004 and 2008. Lewry was the leading wicket-taker in the 2008 County Championship, taking 41 wickets. For the 2009 season, he signed a contract only to play Championship matches, saying "I have only played seven games since 2004 so I have effectively retired from one-day cricket anyway" and "I want to play on and prolong my career. I certainly wouldn’t go anywhere else – I’m Sussex through and through."

After the 2009 season, in which he took 10 wickets, Lewry announced his retirement from first-class cricket; He had hinted at retirement many times since 2005, so much so that his hints at retirement "have become something of a joke in Sussex". Lewry actually retired this time. He went to play for Goring Cricket Club, the team that he had left in 1994 to join Sussex.
