= Jono McLean =

South African cricketer

Personal information
- Full name: Jonathan James McLean
- Born: 11 July 1980 (age 46); Johannesburg, Transvaal, South Africa
- Height: 6 ft 1 in (1.85 m)
- Batting: Right-handed
- Bowling: Right-arm medium

Domestic team information
- Years: Team
- 2001–2004: Western Province
- 2005–2006: Hampshire (squad no. 19)
- 2008–2011: Berkshire

Career statistics
Competition	FC	LA	T20
Matches	13	11	6
Runs scored	464	60	39
Batting average	27.29	12.00	9.75
100s/50s	–/5	–/–	–/–
Top score	68	36	23
Catches/stumpings	11/–	7/–	1/–
- Source: Cricinfo, 14 August 2009

Jonathan 'Jono' James McLean (born 11 July 1980) is a South African former cricketer.

McLean was born at Johannesburg in July 1980, where he was educated at St Stithians College. He made his debut in first-class cricket for Western Province against Northerns at Centurion in the 2001–02 Supersport Series. He played first-class cricket for Western Province until the 2003–04 season, making five appearances. In these, he scored 157 runs at an average of 22.42, with one half century score of 57. He also made an additional first-class appearance in South Africa for the South African Academy cricket team against Sri Lanka A in October 2003. He also made two List A one-day appearances in the 2002–03 Standard Bank Cup.

In 2004, McLean, who held a British passport, trialled in England for Hampshire and was signed by the county after averaging over 80 in the Second XI Championship. Commenting on his potential, Hampshire Director of Cricket Tim Tremlett described him as an "exciting player" and a part of their future plans. His debut for Hampshire came in a first-class match against Kent in the 2005 County Championship. McLean played six County Championship matches in 2005, but made just one appearance in the 2006 County Championship. In these seven matches, he scored 302 runs at an average of 33.55, with four half centuries and a highest score of 68. He made eight appearances in one-day cricket in 2005 and one in 2006, scoring 60 runs with a highest score of 36. McLean also made six appearances in the 2006 Twenty20 Cup, scoring 39 runs with a highest score of 23. McLean was released by Hampshire following the 2006 season, alongside Richard Logan.

Following his release by Hampshire, McLean played minor counties cricket for Berkshire from 2008 to 2011, making twenty appearances in the Minor Counties Championship and eighteen in the MCCA Knockout Trophy. Following the end of his playing career, he set up a company which employed former Hampshire cricketer Tom Parsons; this company ultimately failed, but McLean and Parsons went into business together and formed a new company.
