= 2003 ECB National League =

- Administrator(s): England and Wales Cricket Board
- Cricket format: Limited overs cricket (45 overs per innings)
- Tournament format(s): League system
- Champions: Surrey Lions (2nd title)
- Participants: 19
- Matches: 162
- Most runs: 820 Michael Hussey
- Most wickets: 34 Dimitri Mascarenhas

The 2003 ECB National League season was a 45 over English county cricket competition; colloquially known as the Sunday League. Surrey Lions won the League for the second time.

== Final standings ==
=== Division One ===
Team	P	W	L	T	NR	Pts	RunRate
1. Surrey Lions	16	12	3	0	1	50	2.99
2. Gloucestershire Gladiators	16	11	4	0	0	46	4.48
3. Essex Eagles	16	8	7	1	0	34	3.80
4. Warwickshire Bears	16	8	8	0	0	32	-0.57
5. Glamorgan Dragons	16	8	8	0	0	32	-0.94
6. Kent Spitfires	16	7	8	1	0	30	3.52
7. Leicestershire Foxes	16	7	9	0	0	28	-3.83
8. Yorkshire Phoenix	16	5	11	0	0	20	-6.96
9. Worcestershire Royals	16	4	12	0	0	16	-1.16

= Champions
= Relegated

=== Division two ===
Team	P	W	L	T	NR	Pts	RunRate
1. Lancashire Lightning	18	14	3	0	1	58	5.81
2. Northamptonshire Steelbacks	18	12	5	0	1	50	11.00
3. Hampshire Hawks	18	11	7	0	0	44	4.80
4. Middlesex Crusaders	18	10	7	0	1	42	-0.27
5. Nottinghamshire Outlaws	18	9	9	0	0	36	-0.62
6. Derbyshire Scorpions	18	8	8	0	2	36	0.36
7. Durham Dynamos	18	7	10	0	1	30	4.24
8. Sussex Sharks	18	6	12	0	0	24	-8.17
9. Somerset Sabres	18	5	12	0	1	22	-4.12
10. Scotland	18	4	13	0	1	18	-14.03

= Promoted
