= Kevin Latouf =

South African-born English cricketer

Personal information
- Full name: Kevin John Latouf
- Born: 7 September 1985 (age 41); Pretoria, Transvaal, South Africa
- Nickname: Latsy
- Height: 5 ft 1 in (1.55 m)
- Batting: Right-handed
- Bowling: Right-arm medium

Domestic team information
- Years: Team
- 2005–2008: Hampshire (squad no. 28)

Career statistics
Competition	First-class	List A
Matches	1	11
Runs scored	29	90
Batting average	29.00	11.25
100s/50s	–/–	–/–
Top score	29	25
Catches/stumpings	–/–	6/–
- Source: Cricinfo, 13 August 2009

Kevin John Latouf (born 7 September 1985) is a South African-born English former cricketer.

Latouf was born in South Africa at Pretoria in September 1985. As a child, he moved to England where he was raised in Fareham. He was educated at Millfield on a tennis scholarship, before progressing to Barton Peveril Sixth Form College. After good form for the Hampshire Second XI in 2005, in which he scored 284 runs at an average of 56.80, Latouf was called up to the England Under-19 team for their Under-19 Test and One Day International (ODI) series against Sri Lanka Under-19s; he played in all three Test and ODI matches in the series. With Kevin Pietersen being called up to England's squad for the 2005 Ashes series, Latouf replaced him in Hampshire's squad for their Cheltenham & Gloucester Trophy quarter-final, with him making his debut in List A one-day cricket against Surrey. He would appear in their semi-final victory against Yorkshire, and in the final against Warwickshire at Lord's, which Hampshire won by 18 runs, with Latouf taking what was described as a "stunning" catch to help dismiss Nick Knight. In the absence of Pietersen for the remainder of the 2005 season, Latouf also appeared in six one-day matches in the 2005 totesport League.

The following season, he made a single appearance for Hampshire in first-class cricket against Loughborough UCCE at the Rose Bowl. Batting twice in the match, he was dismissed for 29 runs in Hampshire's only innings by Richard Morris. In the proceeding seasons, Latouf found his opportunities at Hampshire limited, with him making just two further one-day appearances, against the West Indies A cricket team in 2006 and Worcestershire in the 2008 Friends Provident Trophy. In eleven one-day appearances, he scored 90 runs at an average of 11.25, with a highest score of 25. Midway through the 2008 season, he was loaned to Warwickshire for one month, but did not feature for their first eleven. He was released by Hampshire at the end of that season, alongside the Zimbabwean Greg Lamb. Following his release, Latouf opened a wine bar and coffee shop in Winchester with rugby union international Chris Robshaw. He has since opened a coffee bar with his wife, Flora, in Lagos, Portugal.
