= 1996 Axa Equity & Law League =

- Administrator(s): Test and County Cricket Board
- Cricket format: Limited overs cricket (40 overs per innings)
- Tournament format(s): League
- Champions: Surrey
- Participants: 18
- Matches: 153
- Most runs: 815 Phil Simmons (Leicestershire)
- Most wickets: 39 Adam Hollioake (Surrey)

The 1996 AXA Equity & Law League was the twenty-eighth competing of English cricket's Sunday League. The competition was won for the first time by Surrey County Cricket Club.

== Standings ==
Team	Pld	W	T	L	N/R	A	Pts	NetRRN100
Surrey (C)	17	12	0	4	0	1	50	16.145
Nottinghamshire	17	12	0	4	0	1	50	10.185
Yorkshire	17	11	0	6	0	0	44	11.594
Warwickshire	17	10	0	6	1	0	42	4.888
Somerset	17	10	0	6	0	1	42	1.148
Northamptonshire	17	10	0	6	1	0	42	0.421
Middlesex	17	9	0	7	0	1	38	-2.035
Worcestershire	17	8	0	6	2	1	38	1.885
Lancashire	17	9	0	8	0	0	36	-0.162
Kent	17	8	1	8	0	0	34	-7.655
Derbyshire	17	7	1	7	1	1	34	4.357
Leicestershire	17	7	0	7	2	1	34	-0.104
Glamorgan	17	7	0	8	1	1	32	2.738
Sussex	17	6	0	9	1	1	28	-11.508
Hampshire	17	4	0	10	1	2	22	-6.163
Gloucestershire	17	4	0	10	1	2	22	-8.19
Essex	17	4	0	12	1	0	18	-3.572
Durham	17	1	0	15	0	1	6	-15.491
Team marked (C) finished as champions. Source: CricketArchive

== See also ==
Sunday League
