= Shaun Udal =

English cricketer (born 1969)

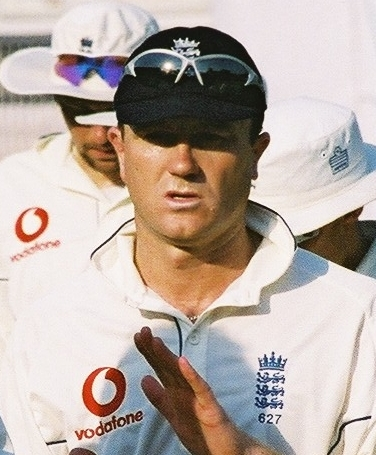

Personal information
- Full name: Shaun David Udal
- Born: 18 March 1969 (age 57); Cove, Farnborough, Hampshire, England
- Nickname: Shaggy
- Height: 6 ft 2 in (1.88 m)
- Batting: Right-handed
- Bowling: Right arm off break
- Role: Bowler

International information
- National side: England
- Test debut (cap 627): 12 November 2005 v Pakistan
- Last Test: 22 March 2006 v India
- ODI debut (cap 127): 19 May 1994 v New Zealand
- Last ODI: 21 December 2005 v Pakistan
- ODI shirt no.: 2

Domestic team information
- Years: Team
- 1989–2007: Hampshire (squad no. 2)
- 2008–2010: Middlesex (squad no. 8)

Career statistics
Competition	Test	ODI	FC	LA
Matches	4	11	301	410
Runs scored	109	35	7,931	2,966
Batting average	18.16	11.66	22.59	16.29
100s/50s	0/0	0/0	1/34	0/9
Top score	33*	11*	117*	79*
Balls bowled	596	612	53,921	18,667
Wickets	8	9	822	458
Bowling average	43.00	44.44	32.47	30.19
5 wickets in innings	0	0	37	1
10 wickets in match	0	0	5	0
Best bowling	4/14	2/37	8/50	5/43
Catches/stumpings	1/–	1/–	127/–	136/–
- Source: Cricinfo, 3 September 2010

Shaun David Udal (born 18 March 1969) is an English cricketer. An off spin bowler and lower-middle order batsman, he was a member of England's Test team for their tours to Pakistan and India in 2005/06.

== International career ==
He played in ten One Day Internationals in 1994 and 1995, including the winter tour of Australia, but did not play for the Test team at that time. It was not until September 2005, after an impressive season with Hampshire, that he was recalled to the England squad for their tour of Pakistan when they were looking for more spinners in addition to Ashley Giles. He made his Test debut in the first Test of that tour at the age of 36. He disappointed somewhat, taking only three wickets in his first three Tests, although he did contribute some runs in the lower order.

However, he retained his place on the Indian tour for later that winter, and returned to the side for the third and final Test in Mumbai. He was instrumental in England's victory, taking figures of 4 wickets for 14 runs in the second innings, including the wicket of Sachin Tendulkar for 34 as England completed a 212 run victory.

With the continuing unavailability through injury of Ashley Giles, Udal started the 2006 season in contention with Monty Panesar for England's spinning berth. He was not, however picked for the opening three-Test series against Sri Lanka, nor for the Ashes tour of Australia which started in November 2006.

On 21 October 2005, against Pakistan he played his first ODI match after more than ten years, which is a record for England.

== Domestic career ==
=== Hampshire ===
In the domestic game he played for Hampshire between 1989 and 2007. He helped the county win the 1991 NatWest Trophy, the 1992 Benson & Hedges Cup, and the 2005 Cheltenham & Gloucester Trophy, as captain in the final of the latter against Warwickshire, deputising for Shane Warne. During his time at Hampshire, he wrote a weekly article throughout the County Cricket season about his experiences the previous week for the Hampshire Chronicle.

=== Middlesex ===
On 17 September 2007 he announced his decision to retire from first-class cricket at the end of the 2007 season. On 30 October 2007 he joined minor county side Berkshire as their professional for the 2008 season and was also set to play for Henley in the Homes Counties League but on 4 December 2007, Udal returned to first-class cricket having signed a two-year deal with Middlesex.

On 25 October 2008, it was announced that he would be the Club Captain for the 2009 season. On 6 April 2009 he was selected in the preliminary 30 man squad to represent England for the 2009 ICC World Twenty20. During the 2010 County Championship, Udal took his 800th wicket, that of Gloucestershire bowler Steve Kirby. Following an indifferent start to that season, he resigned as the County Captain on 11 June with immediate effect. Adam Gilchrist was appointed on an interim basis and led the county for five Twenty20 matches and a tourist fixture until his departure on 24 June. Neil Dexter took on the role permanently after this date. At the end of the 2010 season, Udal announced his retirement from professional cricket.

Preceded by Ed Smith	Middlesex County Cricket Captain; 2009–2010	Succeeded by Adam Gilchrist (interim)
