= Richard Logan (cricketer) =

English cricketer (born 1980)

Personal information
- Full name: Richard James Logan
- Born: 28 January 1980 (age 46); Stone, Staffordshire, England
- Nickname: Bungle
- Height: 6 ft 1 in (1.85 m)
- Batting: Right-handed
- Bowling: RIght arm medium-fast
- Role: Bowler

Domestic team information
- Years: Team
- 1999–2000: Northamptonshire
- 2001–2004: Nottinghamshire
- 2005–2006: Hampshire
- 2007–2008: Northamptonshire
- 2009: Surrey

Career statistics
Competition	FC	LA	T20
Matches	55	67	17
Runs scored	533	220	39
Batting average	9.03	11.00	9.75
100s/50s	0/0	0/0	0/0
Top score	37*	28*	11*
Balls bowled	8,116	2,620	244
Wickets	135	70	17
Bowling average	39.60	36.25	18.52
5 wickets in innings	4	1	1
10 wickets in match	0	0	0
Best bowling	6/93	5/24	5/26
Catches/stumpings	16/–	21/–	0/–
- Source: CricketArchive (subscription required), 30 September 2008

Richard James Logan (born 28 January 1980) is an English cricketer. He is a right-handed batsman and a right-arm medium-fast bowler.

Despite having played hockey at junior level, Logan's passion always lay in cricket, having represented England at Under-15, Under-17 and Under-19 levels. He joined Nottinghamshire in 2000, snubbing an offer from Northamptonshire.

Having suffered a shoulder injury in 2001, he returned and made an instant impact with 11 wickets in the following two matches. He stayed at Nottinghamshire for four years before switching to Hampshire in 2004.

In 2005 he helped Hampshire to a runners-up spot in the Frizzell County Championship.

In 2009 he played in the inaugural London T20 Cricket League where his team, Kensington & Chelsea were the eventual winners.
