= 2008 NatWest Pro40 =

- Administrator(s): England and Wales Cricket Board
- Cricket format: Limited overs cricket (40 overs)
- Tournament format(s): League system
- Champions: Sussex Sharks (1st title)
- Participants: 18
- Matches: 72
- Most runs: Marcus Trescothick (556)
- Most wickets: Jade Dernbach (24)

The 2008 NatWest Pro40 was a league system 40 over competition. Sussex Sharks won Division One, while Essex Eagles finished top of Division Two, gaining promotion; Yorkshire Carnegie were also promoted, but Glamorgan Dragons lost their playoff match and remained in Division Two. Somerset Sabres' Marcus Trescothick was the leading run-scorer in the competition with 556 runs, while Jade Dernbach of Surrey Brown Caps claimed the most wickets, with 24.

== Division One ==
Team	Pld	W	T	L	N/R	Pts	Net R/R
Sussex Sharks ^{C}	8	5	0	1	2	12	–0.106
Hampshire Hawks	8	4	0	2	2	10	+0.633
Durham Dynamos	8	4	0	3	1	9	+0.369
Nottinghamshire Outlaws	8	4	0	4	0	8	+0.250
Gloucestershire Gladiators	8	3	0	3	2	8	–0.460
Somerset Sabres	8	3	1	4	0	7	–0.154
Worcestershire Royals	8	2	1	3	2	7	+0.110
Lancashire Lightning ^{R}	8	1	0	3	4	6	–0.815
Middlesex Crusaders ^{R}	8	2	0	5	1	5	–0.138

== Division two ==
Team	Pld	W	T	L	N/R	Pts	Net R/R
Essex Eagles ^{P}	8	6	1	0	1	14	+1.479
Yorkshire Carnegie ^{P}	8	5	1	1	1	12	+0.250
Glamorgan Dragons	8	5	0	3	0	10	+0.113
Kent Spitfires	8	4	0	2	2	10	+1.629
Surrey Brown Caps	8	4	0	4	0	8	–0.444
Warwickshire Bears	8	3	0	3	2	8	–0.242
Leicestershire Foxes	8	1	1	4	2	5	–0.463
Derbyshire Phantoms	8	1	1	6	0	3	–0.892
Northamptonshire Steelbacks	8	0	0	6	2	2	–0.993
