= 2006 Cheltenham & Gloucester Trophy =

- Administrator: England and Wales Cricket Board
- Cricket format: Limited overs cricket (50 overs)
- Tournament format(s): Group stage and knockout
- Champions: Sussex (5th title)
- Participants: 20
- Matches: 82 (+9 no results)
- Most runs: Mal Loye (543 for Lancashire)
- Most wickets: James Kirtley (19 for Sussex)

The 2006 Cheltenham & Gloucester Trophy was an English county cricket tournament, held between 23 April and 26 August 2006. The tournament was won by Sussex, who defeated Lancashire in the final at Lord's Cricket Ground.

== Group stage ==
=== North Division ===
Team	Pld	W	T	L	NR	Pts	NRR
Lancashire	9	7	0	1	1	15	+1.101
Durham	9	6	0	2	1	13	-0.033
Worcestershire	9	5	0	3	1	11	+0.271
Nottinghamshire	9	4	0	2	3	11	+0.527
Derbyshire	9	5	0	4	0	10	-0.207
Leicestershire	9	4	0	4	1	9	-0.025
Yorkshire	9	3	0	4	2	8	-0.269
Scotland	9	3	0	6	0	6	-0.547
Warwickshire	9	2	0	6	1	5	+0.193
Northamptonshire	9	1	0	8	0	2	-0.961

=== South Conference ===
Team	Pld	W	T	L	NR	Pts	NRR
Sussex	9	7	0	2	0	14	+0.450
Middlesex	9	6	0	2	1	13	+0.397
Essex	9	6	0	3	0	12	+0.837
Hampshire	9	5	0	3	1	11	+1.119
Gloucestershire	9	5	0	3	1	11	+0.413
Kent	9	4	0	4	1	9	+0.012
Somerset	9	4	0	4	1	9	+0.005
Surrey	9	2	0	6	1	5	-1.084
Glamorgan	9	1	0	7	1	3	-1.177
Ireland	9	1	0	7	1	3	-1.259

== Final ==
26 August 2006

Sussex; 172 all out (47.1 overs)	v	Lancashire; 157 all out (47.2 overs)
Yasir Arafat 37 (43) Michael Yardy 37 (96); Sajid Mahmood 3/16 (8.1)		Dominic Cork 35* (53) James Kirtley 5/27 (8.2)

Sussex won by 15 runs
Lord's Cricket Ground, London
Umpires: Jeremy Lloyds and Neil Mallender
Player of the match: James Kirtley (Sussex)
