= Michael Brown (cricketer) =

English cricketer

Personal information
- Full name: Michael James Brown
- Born: 9 February 1980 (age 46); Burnley, Lancashire, England
- Height: 6 ft 0 in (1.83 m)
- Batting: Right-handed
- Bowling: Right-arm off break

Domestic team information
- Years: Team
- 1999–2004: Middlesex
- 2004–2008: Hampshire
- 2008–2011: Surrey

Career statistics
Competition	FC	LA	T20
Matches	96	30	12
Runs scored	5,273	922	284
Batting average	34.01	34.14	25.81
100s/50s	9/28	0/7	0/1
Top score	133	96*	77
Catches/stumpings	71/–	9/–	4/–
- Source: Cricinfo, 9 August 2011

Michael James Brown (born 9 February 1980) is an English first-class cricketer.

== Early life ==
Brown was born in Burnley, Lancashire, attending Queen Elizabeth's Grammar School in neighbouring Blackburn. Like many of his family, he began playing cricket for Burnley Cricket Club, making his debut for the adult side at age 14. His younger brother David is also a Cricketer.

== Career ==
A right-handed batsman, he made his first-class debut for Middlesex in 1999 and joined Hampshire in 2004.

On 3 October 2008 he joined Surrey after speculation in late September.

On 12 January 2010, Brown announced that he would be spending a three-week spell in Trinidad playing for National League side Clico Preysal Sports Club. He intended to use the opportunity as some additional pre-season training prior to the start of the 2010 County Championship.

He missed the whole of the 2010 season after suffering an elbow injury. This injury, as well as a shoulder injury, was still giving him problems the following season, and he was forced to announce his immediate retirement in late July, 2011.

In April 2011, Brown returned to his roots to take up the role of chairman at Burnley Cricket Club.
