= 2005 totesport League =

- Administrator(s): England and Wales Cricket Board
- Cricket format: Limited overs cricket (45 overs per innings)
- Tournament format(s): League system
- Champions: Essex Eagles (4th title)
- Participants: 19
- Matches: 162
- Most runs: 785 Paul Weekes
- Most wickets: 31 James Kirtley

The 2005 totesport League season was a 45 over English county cricket competition; colloquially known as the Sunday League. Essex Eagles won the League for the fourth time.

== Final standings ==
=== Division One ===
Team	P	W	L	T	NR	Pts
1. Essex Eagles	16	13	1	0	2	56
2. Middlesex Crusaders	16	10	5	0	1	42
3. Northamptonshire Steelbacks	16	7	7	0	2	32
4. Glamorgan Dragons	16	6	6	0	4	32
5. Nottinghamshire Outlaws	16	6	7	0	3	30
6. Lancashire Lightning	16	6	9	0	1	26
7. Gloucestershire Gladiators	16	6	9	0	1	26
8. Worcestershire Royals	16	5	10	0	1	22
9. Hampshire Hawks	16	5	10	0	1	22

= Champions
= Relegated

==== Season Progression ====
A detailed description of the season progression can be found here Division One Progression

=== Division two ===
Team	P	W	L	T	NR	Pts
1. Sussex Sharks	18	13	4	0	1	54
2. Durham Dynamos	18	12	4	0	2	52
3. Warwickshire Bears	18	10	6	0	2	44
4. Leicestershire Foxes	18	10	7	0	1	42
5. Derbyshire Scorpions	18	9	7	1	1	40
6. Somerset Sabres	18	9	8	0	1	38
7. Surrey Lions	18	7	10	0	1	30
8. Kent Spitfires	18	6	10	0	2	28
9. Yorkshire Phoenix	18	5	13	0	0	20
10. Scotland Sapphires	18	2	14	1	1	12

= Promoted

==== Season Progression ====
A detailed description of the season progression can be found here Division Two Progression
