= 2006 County Championship =

English cricket tournament

- Dates: 18 April – 23 September 2000
- Administrator: England and Wales Cricket Board
- Cricket format: First-class cricket (4 days)
- Tournament format: League system
- Champions: Sussex (2nd title)
- Participants: 18
- Matches: 144
- Most runs: Mark Ramprakash (2,211 for Surrey)
- Most wickets: Mushtaq Ahmed (102 for Sussex)

The 2006 County Championship season, known as the Liverpool Victoria County Championship for sponsorship reasons, was contested through two divisions: Division One and Division Two. Each team plays all the others in their division both home and away. This season saw a change in promotion and relegation, with the top two teams from Division Two being promoted to the first division for 2007, while the bottom two teams from Division 1 are relegated.

== Teams ==
Teams in the County Championship 2006:

Division One	Division Two
Durham	Derbyshire
Hampshire	Essex
Kent	Glamorgan
Lancashire	Gloucestershire
Middlesex	Leicestershire
Nottinghamshire	Northamptonshire
Sussex	Somerset
Warwickshire	Surrey
Yorkshire	Worcestershire

Icon
Team promoted from Division Two
Team relegated from Division One

== Points system ==
Teams receive 14 points for a win, 6 for a tie and 4 for a draw. Bonus points (a maximum of 5 batting points and 3 bowling points) may be scored during the first 130 overs of each team's first innings.

== Standings ==
=== Division One ===
	Team	P	W	L	D	Bat	Bowl	Ded	Pts
1	Sussex	16	9	2	5	49	47	0	242
2	Lancashire	16	6	1	9	58	46	0	224
3	Hampshire	16	6	3	7	48	48	1	207
4	Warwickshire	16	6	5	5	42	43	0	189
5	Kent	16	4	4	8	43	44	0	175
6	Yorkshire	16	3	6	7	43	41	0	154
7	Durham	16	4	8	4	39	43	0.5	153.5
8	Nottinghamshire	16	4	7	5	40	37	0	153
9	Middlesex	16	1	7	8	47	42	1.5	133

= Champions
= Relegated

=== Division Two ===
	Team	P	W	L	D	Bat	Bowl	Ded	Pts
1	Surrey	16	10	2	4	62	44	0	262
2	Worcestershire	16	8	4	4	58	43	0	229
3	Essex	16	7	4	5	62	40	0	220
4	Leicestershire	16	5	4	7	47	41	0.5	185.5
5	Derbyshire	16	4	4	8	51	41	1.5	178.5
6	Northamptonshire	16	3	5	8	52	37	0	163
7	Gloucestershire	16	3	6	7	51	36	1.5	155.5
8	Glamorgan	16	2	7	7	51	41	1.5	146.5
9	Somerset	16	3	9	4	43	40	1	140

= Champions
= Promoted

== Records ==
Most runs
Aggregate	Average	Player	County
2211	105.28	Mark Ramprakash	Surrey
1804	82.00	Hylton Ackerman	Leicestershire
1737	66.80	John Crawley	Hampshire
1706	77.54	Darren Lehmann	Yorkshire
1649	63.42	Murray Goodwin	Sussex
1427	52.85	Dale Benkenstein	Durham
1424	67.80	Andy Flower	Essex
1419	61.69	Matthew Walker	Kent
1418	59.08	Mark Butcher	Surrey
1370	44.19	Craig Spearman	Gloucestershire

Most wickets
Aggregate	Average	Player	County
102	19.91	Mushtaq Ahmed	Sussex
78	29.07	Zaheer Khan	Worcestershire
66	25.56	Charl Willoughby	Somerset
66	32.00	Robert Croft	Glamorgan
63	35.85	Andy Caddick	Somerset
61	25.22	Chris Silverwood	Middlesex
59	28.16	Ian Salisbury	Surrey
58	27.08	Shane Warne	Hampshire
57	23.17	Jason Lewry	Sussex
56	32.21	Steffan Jones	Derbyshire

== See also ==
- 2006 English cricket season
