= 2009 County Championship =

English cricket tournament

- Dates: 15 April – 26 September 2009
- Administrator: England and Wales Cricket Board
- Cricket format: First-class cricket (4 days)
- Tournament format: League system
- Champions: Durham (2nd title)
- Participants: 18
- Matches: 144
- Most runs: Marcus Trescothick (1,817 for Somerset)
- Most wickets: Danish Kaneria (75 for Essex)

The 2009 County Championship season, known as the LV County Championship for sponsorship reasons, was the 110th County Championship season. It was contested through two divisions: Division One and Division Two. Each team played all the others in their division both home and away. The top two teams from Division Two were promoted to the first division for the 2010 season, while the bottom two teams from Division 1 were relegated.

Durham County Cricket Club won the Championship for the second consecutive season. Worcestershire and Sussex were relegated from Division One, with Kent and Essex promoted in their place.

== Teams ==
Division One	Division Two
Durham	Derbyshire
Hampshire	Essex
Lancashire	Glamorgan
Nottinghamshire	Gloucestershire
Somerset	Kent
Sussex	Leicestershire
Warwickshire	Middlesex
Worcestershire	Northamptonshire
Yorkshire	Surrey

Icon
Team promoted from Division Two
Team relegated from Division One

== Standings ==
Fourteen points were awarded for each win, four points were awarded for a draw or abandonment. Defeats scored no points. Teams were awarded bonus points during the first 130 overs of their first innings; one bowling point for every three wickets taken (up to three points available), and one batting point gained when teams reached 200, 250, 300, 350 and 400 runs (up to five points available).

- Pos = Position, Pld = Played, W = Wins, L = Losses, D = Draws, T = Ties, A = Abandonments, Bat = Batting points, Bowl = Bowling points, Pen = Penalty points, Pts = Points.

=== Division One ===
	Team	P	W	L	D	Bat	Bwl	Ded	Pts
1	Durham (C)	16	8	0	8	49	48	–1	240
2	Nottinghamshire	16	4	2	10	56	41	0	193
3	Somerset	16	3	1	12	50	43	–1	182
4	Lancashire	16	4	2	10	35	44	0	175
5	Warwickshire	16	3	3	10	54	38	0	174
6	Hampshire	16	3	3	10	50	40	–3	169
7	Yorkshire	16	2	2	12	46	44	0	166
8	Sussex (R)	16	2	6	8	45	39	–1	143
9	Worcestershire (R)	16	0	10	6	30	40	0	94
	Source:. Last updated 28 September 2009. Adjustments: Hampshire deducted 3 points for a slow over-rate in their match against Worcestershire. Durham deducted 1 point for a slow over-rate in their match against Sussex. Somerset deducted 1 point for a slow over-rate in their match against Durham. Sussex deducted 1 point for a slow over-rate in their match against Worcestershire.								

=== Division Two ===
	Team	P	W	L	D	Bat	Bwl	Ded	Pts
1	Kent (P)	16	8	3	5	43	44	0	219
2	Essex (P)	16	6	3	7	40	43	–1	194
3	Northamptonshire	16	6	4	6	40	45	0	193
4	Gloucestershire	16	6	6	4	39	46	0	185
5	Glamorgan	16	2	2	12	56	43	0	175
6	Derbyshire	16	2	3	11	55	45	0	172
7	Surrey	16	1	4	11	54	36	0	148
8	Middlesex	16	2	7	7	43	41	0	140
9	Leicestershire	16	2	3	11	31	35	0	138
	Source:. Last updated 28 September 2009. Adjustments: Essex deducted 1 point for a slow over-rate in their match against Middlesex.								
