= 2003 County Championship =

English cricket tournament

- Dates: 18 April – 20 September 2000
- Administrator: England and Wales Cricket Board
- Cricket format: First-class cricket (4 days)
- Tournament format: League system
- Champions: Sussex (1st title)
- Participants: 18
- Matches: 144
- Most runs: Stuart Law (1,820 for Lancashire)
- Most wickets: Mushtaq Ahmed (103 for Sussex)

The 2003 County Championship season, known as the Frizzell County Championship, was the 103rd County Championship. It was contested through two divisions: Division One and Division Two. Each team played all the others in their division both home and away. The top three teams from Division Two were promoted to the first division for the 2004 season, while the bottom three teams from Division 1 were relegated.

== Standings ==
- 14 points for a win
- 6 points for a tie
- 4 points for a draw
- 4 points for an abandoned game
- A maximum of 5 batting bonus points and 3 bowling bonus points

=== Division One ===
	Team	P	W	L	T	D	Bat	Bowl	Ded	Pts
1	Sussex	16	10	4	0	2	62	47	0	257
2	Lancashire	16	6	2	0	8	64	43	0	223
3	Surrey	16	6	3	0	7	63	44	0	219
4	Kent	16	6	5	0	5	47	47	0	198
5	Warwickshire	16	4	5	1	6	50	37	2.5	171.5
6	Middlesex	16	3	3	0	10	46	41	0	169
7	Essex	16	3	5	1	7	34	45	0	156
8	Nottinghamshire	16	2	8	0	6	36	45	1	132
9	Leicestershire	16	1	6	0	9	36	40	0.5	125
	Source:.									

= Champions
= Relegated

=== Division Two ===
	Team	P	W	L	D	Bat	Bowl	Ded	Pts
1	Worcestershire	16	10	1	5	42	44	0.25	245.75
2	Northamptonshire	16	10	2	4	45	44	8	237
3	Gloucestershire	16	5	2	9	38	46	0	190
4	Yorkshire	16	4	5	7	54	47	1.5	183.5
5	Glamorgan	16	5	5	6	45	45	1	183
6	Durham	16	5	7	4	31	43	0.75	159.25
7	Somerset	16	4	8	4	41	44	0	157
8	Hampshire	16	2	6	8	36	44	0	140
9	Derbyshire	16	2	11	3	30	44	0	114
	Source:								

= Champions
= Promoted
