= 2007 County Championship =

English cricket tournament

- Dates: 18 April – 22 September 2007
- Administrator: England and Wales Cricket Board
- Cricket format: First-class cricket (4 days)
- Tournament format: League system
- Champions: Sussex (3rd title)
- Participants: 18
- Matches: 144
- Most runs: Mark Ramprakash (2,026 for Surrey)
- Most wickets: Mushtaq Ahmed (90 for Sussex)

The 2007 County Championship season, known as the LV County Championship for sponsorship reasons, was contested through two divisions: Division One and Division Two. Each team plays all the others in their division both home and away. The top two teams from Division Two were promoted to the first division for 2008, while the bottom two teams from Division 1 were relegated.

== Teams ==
Teams in the County Championship 2007:

Division One	Division Two
Durham	Derbyshire
Hampshire	Essex
Kent	Glamorgan
Lancashire	Gloucestershire
Surrey	Leicestershire
Sussex	Middlesex
Warwickshire	Northamptonshire
Worcestershire	Nottinghamshire
Yorkshire	Somerset

Icon
Team promoted from Division Two
Team relegated from Division One

== Standings ==
Fourteen points were awarded for each win, four points were awarded for a draw or abandonment. Defeats scored no points. Teams were awarded bonus points during the first 130 overs of their first innings; one bowling point for every three wickets taken (up to three points available), and one batting point gained when teams reached 200, 250, 300, 350 and 400 runs (up to five points available).

=== Division One ===
	Team	P	W	L	D	A	Bat	Bwl	Ded	Pts
1	Sussex	16	7	3	5	1	37	43	0	202
2	Durham	16	7	5	4	0	38	47	–1½	197½
3	Lancashire	16	5	2	8	1	40	44	0	190
4	Surrey	16	5	4	6	1	41	40	–1	178
5	Hampshire	16	5	3	8	0	32	43	0	177
6	Yorkshire	16	4	4	8	0	49	38	0	175
7	Kent	16	3	5	7	1	43	36	0	153
8	Warwickshire	16	2	5	9	0	40	38	0	139
9	Worcestershire	16	1	8	5	2	18	35	0	95
	Source:									

=== Division Two ===
	Team	P	W	L	D	A	Bat	Bwl	Ded	Pts
1	Somerset	16	10	1	5	0	65	41	0	266
2	Nottinghamshire	16	6	3	7	0	60	43	–½	214½
3	Middlesex	16	6	2	8	0	35	43	–1½	192½
4	Essex	16	6	4	6	0	40	36	–2	182
5	Northamptonshire	16	5	5	6	0	44	38	0	176
6	Derbyshire	16	3	5	8	0	30	44	–1	147
7	Gloucestershire	16	3	5	8	0	32	37	–3½	139½
8	Leicestershire	16	2	8	5	1	32	35	–4	115
9	Glamorgan	16	1	9	5	1	26	37	–8½	92½
	Source:									

== Leading averages ==
Most runs
Aggregate	Average	Player	County
2,026	101.30	Mark Ramprakash	Surrey
1,384	55.36	David Sales	Northamptonshire
1,329	66.45	Michael Di Venuto	Durham
1,315	62.61	Marcus Trescothick	Somerset
1,284	75.52	Simon Katich	Derbyshire

Most wickets
Aggregate	Average	Player	County
90	25.66	Mushtaq Ahmed	Sussex
80	20.75	Ottis Gibson	Durham
74	22.20	Danish Kaneria	Essex
70	24.14	Andy Caddick	Somerset
62	24.67	Charl Willoughby	Somerset
