= Yorkshire County Cricket Club in 2005 =

2005 season of an English cricket team

Yorkshire Phoenix
2005 season
- Captain: Craig White
- Ground(s): Headingley; Scarborough

Yorkshire County Cricket Club in 2005 were in the second division of both the County Championship and the totesport League. At 6–1 odds to win the Second Division of the County Championship, they were likely to struggle again – as they had done since they won the First Division championship in 2001.

They started the County Championship poorly, being on the wrong end of a draw with Essex. One day after they went to the Oval for their first game in the totesport League, and won a high-scoring thriller. The second Championship game, however, was a comprehensive innings victory over Somerset, who they also beat easily on the Sunday by 5 wickets. The following Sunday they took on, and beat, Sussex County Cricket Club.

They then beat Ireland in Belfast on 3 and 4 May to progress to the Second Round of the C&G Trophy, before going on to record two comfortable victories in the Championship against Northamptonshire and Leicestershire.

On 17 May they beat Worcestershire to progress to the Quarter-Finals of the C&G Trophy. They then drew with Durham and Essex in the Championship to leave them second in Division Two at the end of May. Yorkshire then beat Bradford/Leeds UCCE before drawing the 4-day Roses clash with Lancashire and going down heavily in a low-scoring match against Leicestershire in the one-day league.

Another loss followed, a humiliating one to Lancashire in the inaugural Twenty20 match, before winning a close second game, against Nottinghamshire Outlaws at Trent Bridge. Three losses in the middle of the group stage sent them virtually out of the tournament, though, as they would never have qualified with four losses. However, their Twenty20 wounds were quickly healed, with three victories – in the County Championship, the National League and the C&G Trophy semi-final. They moved into the top three on 23 July when they beat Leicestershire by six wickets, coming back from a first-innings deficit of 179 runs.

The following day, they lost to Warwickshire by eight wickets in the National League, to lose sight of the three promotion spots in Division 2. A draw with Derbyshire in the County Championship followed, which saw them jump up to second place in the table. In the National League two days later, however, they lost to Kent by five wickets. A virtual second XI beat Bangladesh A by 126 runs in the first week of August, declaring twice, but the first XI was back to beat Scotland by five wickets in the National League. Three days later, the team travelled to Somerset to draw a Championship game and lose a National League game. Their third draw in succession came in the third week of August, when they drew with Lancashire at Old Trafford, which sent them down to third place in the Division Two table. Their fourth match without a victory came at Southampton in the C&G Trophy semi-final, where they lost to Hampshire.

Yorkshire's last Championship match of August was their eighth draw of the season and the fourth in a row against Durham, a result that temporarily put them into second place in the table. However, Lancashire's victory the following day meant they fell back to third. They finished August with two National League losses to Derbyshire and Kent, and continued in the same vein as they lost by 133 runs to Leicestershire at home.

A busy September month, including eight matches, did not yield a single victory. After the Leicestershire loss, they drew with Worcestershire, before the team lost two National League games to Durham and Derbyshire. On 19 September Yorkshire secured promotion, drawing with Derbyshire and taking full bonus points to go an unassailable 22.5 points ahead of Essex. In the National League, however, they reinforced their place as the worst of the 18 counties (Scotland excluded) with a loss to Warwickshire, before losing to Northamptonshire and Sussex Sharks in the Championship and League respectively.

== Players ==
- Ian Harvey
- Phil Jaques
- Richard Blakey
- Richard Dawson
- Michael Lumb
- Matthew Hoggard
- Anthony McGrath
- Chris Silverwood
- Michael Vaughan
- Matthew Wood
- Tim Bresnan
- John Blain
- Ismail Dawood
- Simon Guy
- Chris Taylor
- Chris Silverwood
- Andrew Gale
- Mark Lawson
- Rich Pyrah
- Joe Sayers
- Nick Thornicroft
- David Wainwright

== Tables ==
=== Championship ===
2005 County Championship – Division Two
Pos	Team	Pld	W	D	L	Pen	Bat	Bowl	Pts
1	Lancashire	16	7	6	3	0	43	47	212
2	Durham	16	6	8	2	0	45	44	205
3	Yorkshire	16	5	10	1	0.5	49	42	200.5
4	Northamptonshire	16	5	8	3	0	45	46	193
5	Essex	16	5	7	4	0	51	36	185
6	Worcestershire	16	5	4	7	5.5	53	46	179.5
7	Leicestershire	16	3	7	6	0.5	45	45	159.5
8	Somerset	16	4	5	7	0	42	37	155
9	Derbyshire	16	1	7	8	0	31	43	116

=== totesport League ===
2005 totesport League – Division Two
Pos	Team	Pld	W	L	NR	T	Pts
1	Sussex Sharks	18	13	4	1	0	54
2	Durham Dynamos	18	12	4	2	0	52
3	Warwickshire Bears	18	10	6	2	0	44
4	Leicestershire Foxes	18	10	7	1	0	42
5	Derbyshire Phantoms	18	9	7	1	1	40
6	Somerset Sabres	18	9	8	1	0	38
7	Surrey Lions	18	7	10	1	0	30
8	Kent Spitfires	18	6	10	2	0	28
9	Yorkshire Phoenix	18	5	13	0	0	20
10	Scottish Saltires	18	2	14	1	1	12

== Match details ==
=== Essex v Yorkshire (13–16 April) ===
Essex (12pts) drew with Yorkshire (5.5pts)

At Chelmsford, Yorkshire won the toss and put Essex in to bat. Essex never looked by, as Will Jefferson, Essex' 6'10'' opener put on 149 before being out leg before just before the end of the first day's play. Essex captain, Ronnie Irani, said, "People think his height is a weakness, they try and over-test it—they try and pitch it up too much or bowl short too much." Jefferson could have been run out for 0 after a mix-up with Cook, and was dropped on 6. Alastair Cook, hero for the MCC at Lord's fell early for 11. However, Jefferson was given admirable support by Zimbabwean Grant Flower, who was 55 not out at close, with Essex on 224 for 2, after 26 overs were lost to rain. Seven Yorkshire bowlers were used, but few had any success, and England bowler Matthew Hoggard went wicketless on the first day.

A total of 47 overs were possible in the next two days, as Essex moved on to 394 for 4 – losing two men to Hoggard. Andy Flower, Grant's brother, and Ronnie Irani were on unbeaten half-centuries at the close of the third day's play, a draw a virtual certainty.

After adding only 7 in 11 balls on the fourth and final day, Essex declared on 401 for 4, batting on to score the extra bonus point before putting Yorkshire in. Yorkshire found it difficult on a pitch that must have been affected by the rain. Whilst Yorkshire's captain, Craig White, resisted with 59 not out, the team disintegrated to 205, 196 behind. Essex enforced the follow-on, but in yet another rain-affected day, Yorkshire held on. Jaques scored 67 not out from 88 balls out of his team's 105 for 2. Essex scored maximum bonus points, but were denied by the weather. Yorkshire escaped with the draw, but were fined 0.5 points for a slow over rate during Essex' innings.

=== Surrey v Yorkshire (17 April) ===
Jimmy Ormond comes in to bowl for Surrey.

Yorkshire (4pts) beat Surrey (0pts) by 43 runs

At the Oval, Yorkshire Phoenix won the toss and batted. Matthew Wood anchored the innings with 111 off 127 balls, Australian Ian Harvey plundered 69 from 48, and Harvey's compatriot Phil Jaques took 49 from 39. Yorkshire ended on 334 for 5, a record score for them in the Sunday League against Surrey Lions. In reply Surrey tried to knock off their target in sixes, with 9 coming in their innings. Ali Brown scored 5 of them as he plundered 86 off 46. But wickets fell, and Surrey's specialist bowlers were not renowned for their batting abilities. When Brown was out, Surrey were 261 for 6, and still leading on Duckworth-Lewis. However, with no recognised batsmen left, only a Yorkshire victory was likely. When Mohammad Akram was stumped off a no-ball, Surrey were 291 all out, 43 runs in arrears. The pick of the Yorkshire bowling was captain Craig White with 4 for 14 in 4 overs.

=== Yorkshire v Somerset (20–23 April) ===
Yorkshire (22pts) beat Somerset (3pts) by an innings and 44 runs

Rain meant no play was possible on the first day at Headingley. The second day was dominated by Ian Harvey, who, at close, was on a career-best 161 not out after being dropped by Andy Caddick on 96. Yorkshire were on 401 for 7. Matthew Wood had added 95 in 174 balls earlier in the day.

The third day Somerset acting captain, Marcus Trescothick, was away, as his first child was born in the night. On the field Yorkshire declared on 501 for 9, after Harvey got 209 not out, and Tim Bresnan 74. Their eighth-wicket partnership of 238 is the second-highest for Yorkshire after the 292 put on by Lord Hawke and Bobby Peel in 1896. Somerset, batting with 10 men, lost opener Sanath Jayasuriya for 0 after 3 balls, and were all out for 182. Following on Somerset plummeted to 10 for 3, and then 37 for 4 (which, given Trescothick's absence, meant that they only had five batsmen left). However, they avoided losing further wickets on the third day, finishing on 109 for 4 at close, still 310 runs behind.

Somerset clung on for 66 overs on the fourth and final day, with John Francis carrying his bat for 125 as they recovered to 275. This left Yorkshire with their first win of the campaign, and a comprehensive victory.

=== Yorkshire v Somerset (24 April) ===
Yorkshire (4pts) beat Somerset (0pts) by 5 wickets

The home side won easily at Headingley. The Sabres batted first and made 209 for 9 in their 45 overs, with four batsmen out with scores between 25 and 40. Former England Under-19 player Tim Bresnan took four for 25 for Yorkshire Phoenix. Yorkshire were always in control, thanks to a third-wicket partnership of 84 in 15 overs between Phil Jaques, who scored 84 off 78 balls, and Michael Lumb. Despite two late wickets, Yorkshire finished in style to win by 5 wickets with 32 balls remaining.

=== Yorkshire v Sussex (1 May) ===
Yorkshire (4pts) beat Sussex (0pts) by 3 wickets

Richard Dawson and Craig White took 3 wickets apiece to help dismiss the Sharks for 157, as Sussex lost the last 7 wickets for 55 runs. Despite tight bowling from Mushtaq Ahmed on a damp pitch, the Phoenix eased to a win with 3 wickets and 27 balls remaining. Anthony McGrath (37) and Ian Harvey (30) shared a fifth-wicket stand of 63.

=== Ireland v Yorkshire (3–4 May) ===
Yorkshire beat Ireland by 6 wickets to progress to Round Two of the C&G Trophy

Ireland, trying to emulate their success in this competition against Surrey last year, fared poorly on the first day at Belfast. After being put into bat by Yorkshire, the visitors' fast bowler Matthew Hoggard took two wickets to help reduce them to 33 for 3 when rain put an end to proceedings for the day after 12.3 overs. After the play that was possible, Irish vice-captain Kyle McCallan said, "It was disappointing losing our top three batsmen so early on. But our strength is in our depth of batting. It's not the end of the world at the moment and we're still hoping to post a total of around 200."

On the second day they achieved this, reaching 201 thanks to half-centuries from Eoin Morgan and Peter Gillespie, but it was never going to be enough against Yorkshire. Half-centuries from Ian Harvey, Michael Vaughan and Phil Jaques saw the visitors home with 15 balls to spare as they made 202 for 4.

=== Yorkshire v Northamptonshire (6–9 May) ===
Yorkshire (20pts) beat Northamptonshire (5pts) by 10 wickets

Northamptonshire were dismissed for 281 on the first day at Headingley, with Deon Kruis taking 5 for 59. It was a recovery of sorts, as Ben Phillips and Johann Louw put on 95 for the eighth wicket, but Anthony McGrath ended the visitors' resistance with three wickets. Yorkshire were 30 for 0 in reply at the end of the first day. Phil Jaques dominated the second day, with his 176, which helped Yorkshire to an all out total of 328, a small lead of 47. His fellow Australian Damien Wright recorded what turned out to be Northamptonshire's best bowling figures, ending with eight for 60. Northants were 9 for 0 at stumps on the second day.

On the third day, ten-man Northamptonshire capitulated. They lost their first wicket without a run being added, and never really got going, being 115 for 7 at close on the third day, and being dismissed for 175 and setting a target of 129 on the fourth. It was clear they were not going to win, and Yorkshire gave them no chances, winning by 10 wickets.

=== Leicestershire v Yorkshire (11–14 May) ===
Yorkshire (17pts) beat Leicestershire (5pts) by six wickets

Yorkshire made an epic comeback against Leicestershire at Grace Road. Leicestershire won the toss and batted, scoring 278 with HD Ackerman top-scoring with a quick 85 not out – forging partnerships with everyone from 6 to 11, who were asked to block at the other end and thus were all out in single figures. After the Barbadian pace bowler Ottis Gibson had reduced Yorkshire to 151, getting Matthew Wood, Phil Jaques and Ian Harvey out in his 6–56, Leicestershire began the task of assembling a big lead. Everyone made some sort of contribution, but the most intriguing decision of the day was captain Ackerman's – with the lead of 403 and well over a day and a half left to play, he decided not to send fellow countryman Charl Willoughby in to bat and declared instead, thinking he would be more use with the new ball.

It backfired spectacularly. Wood (48), Jaques (37), Michael Vaughan (53) and Harvey (47) all made entertaining knocks, but it was Anthony McGrath who stole the show with a five-and-a-half-hour 165 not out – the grindstone of Yorkshire's amazing runchase, the highest in the Championship this season – indeed, the highest fourth-innings run chase in the club's history. Leicestershire's bowlers were smashed to all corners, Phil DeFreitas the only one who escaped with some respectability as he took two for 50 in eleven overs. Gibson, Leicestershire's best performer of the first innings, conceded 124 for no wicket the second time around.

=== Durham v Yorkshire (15 May) ===
Durham (4pts) beat Yorkshire (0pts) by 51 runs

Durham continued their fine start to the season with a comfortable win at Chester-le-Street. They started slowly, making only 60 (for no loss) after 20 overs. But helped by Mike Hussey they picked up the pace, ending on 256 for 4. Yorkshire's reply started quicker, but the Dynamos kept taking wickets, finally dismissing the Phoenix for 205. Paul Collingwood and Gareth Breese took 3 each.

=== Yorkshire v Worcestershire (17 May) ===
Yorkshire beat Worcestershire by 14 runs to progress to the Quarter-Finals of the C&G Trophy

Yorkshire batted first at Headingley and fared poorly at first, slumping to 88 for 4 when Michael Vaughan cut the ball from Zander de Bruyn onto his stumps. Craig White and Anthony McGrath then put on 83 in 22 overs, and late hitting gave Yorkshire a defendable total of 241 for 9 with 52 off the last 5 overs. The Worcestershire innings followed a similar course. First they were reduced to 50 for 3, and then Kabir Ali (67) and Zander de Bruyn (82) came together, putting on 117. White then interrupted them, taking three wickets. The run-chase was thus effectively curtailed, and Worcestershire finished well behind on 227 for 8.

=== Durham v Yorkshire (20–23 May) ===
Durham (10pts) drew with Yorkshire (9pts)

In the clash of the two top teams of Division Two of the Championship, Durham came the closest to losing a game so far in the season – though they threw it away themselves. With England requiring Steve Harmison to be rested, the team at last looked beatable, though they had Yorkshire on the rack at 124 for 7 and 179 for 9. However, Richard Dawson and Deon Kruis let loose for Yorkshire, scoring 75 for the last wicket in a late blitz to guide Yorkshire to a total of 254.

In reply, Durham were in a spot of bother at 146 for 6, but a partnership worth 126 between Gareth Breese and Philip Mustard lifted Durham to 316. With a 62-run deficit on first innings, Yorkshire lost their first seven wickets for only 128 runs, but Anthony McGrath hit a potentially match-saving 133 not out – his second important century of the season, following his 165 not out against Leicestershire a week earlier. He was supported by Chris Silverwood, who smashed 80 off 66 balls before eventually being bowled by Michael Lewis, who removed the five last batsmen in his five for 80.

Despite McGrath's big score, Durham were only set 245 to win in well over a day. They started sedately, as Michael Hussey (23 not out) and Jon Lewis (18 not out) took them to stumps on day three without losing a wicket, and cut 53 off the winning target. What looked like a reasonably simple chase, however, was intervened by rain, bad light and clever bowling from the South African Kruis. Gordon Muchall and Hussey looked to be securing it at 132 for 2, however, but a mini-collapse in the last overs saw the Durham fans biting their nails. Eventually, the chase was stopped nineteen runs short of victory for Durham, but they lost eight wickets in the process and were probably glad to escape with a draw – though they would be ruing the slow scoring at the end. Dale Benkenstein, their No. 4, hit 28 not out off 78 balls.

=== Yorkshire v Essex (25–28 May) ===
Essex (12pts) drew with Yorkshire (9pts)

Centuries from Andy Flower (188) and Ronnie Irani (103) along with 93 from the former Yorkshire player Darren Gough helped Essex to a massive score of 622 for 8 declared at Headingley, as Yorkshire's bowling were taken for runs. Essex were 76 for 4 after two wickets from Deon Kruis, but Yorkshire failed to turn the screw, and the partnerships for the fifth to eighth wicket were all worth more than 100 runs for Essex. Andy Flower and Irani added 213 for the fifth wicket.

New Zealand all-rounder Andre Adams then took two early wickets to dig into Yorkshire, who finished the second day on 53 for 2. The third day was calmly played by Yorkshire, as only Gough could take wickets – ending with four for 49. Yorkshire saw out the day well to end on 336 for 8, meaning that Essex would have to take twelve wickets on the final day to win the game. They only dug out seven – Tim Bresnan, Chris Silverwood and Deon Kruis frustrating them to build a further 72 runs overnight in the first innings, and following on Yorkshire easily withstood the spin of James Middlebrook who had to bowl 29 of 68 Essex overs, as Yorkshire made their way to 238 for 5 with Phil Jaques and Anthony McGrath making half-centuries.

=== Yorkshire v Scotland (30 May) ===
Yorkshire (4pts) beat Scotland (0pts) by 60 runs

Despite four Yorkshire Phoenix run outs, and four maidens from Paul Hoffmann, the hosts still managed to score 214 all out in the first innings at Headingley, Anthony McGrath making 57 from number five. Scotland Saltires then crumbled to 154, former England all-rounder Craig White taking three Scottish wickets as only the hired-in man from Durham, Gavin Hamilton, managed some resistance with the bat. Hamilton, who had played ODI cricket for Scotland at the 1999 World Cup, made 60, but he was one of only two Scots to pass 20. Yorkshire continued their promotion charge, however, as they jumped ahead of Somerset in the table and into second place. However, after this match, Yorkshire only won one of their remaining fourteen games.

=== Yorkshire v Bradford/Leeds UCCE (1–3 June) ===
Yorkshire beat Bradford/Leeds UCCE by 5 wickets

Bradford/Leeds UCCE's last game against first-class opposition of the season was against Yorkshire at Headingley. The first day was washed out by rain, before both teams subsided for low scores on the second day. First Bradford/Leeds UCCE were all out for 105 with Yorkshireman David Lucas taking 6 for 20 off his 9 overs. In reply Yorkshire managed only 151, despite Simon Guy adding 51 for the sixth wicket with Lucas, and there was still time for Bradford/Leeds to lose 3 wickets for 12 runs before close on the second day. On the third day there was some resistance from James Duffy (49, the highest score of the match) and Mohammed Ali (47), but the students could only make it to 161, leaving Yorkshire a target of 116. They lost 5 wickets in knocking off the runs.

=== Yorkshire v Lancashire (8–11 June) ===
Yorkshire (10pts) drew with Lancashire (11pts)

Lancashire batted first in the Roses match at Headingley and though opening batsman Mark Chilton was out first ball to Matthew Hoggard his partner Iain Sutcliffe made a free-scoring 153 including 26 boundaries. Former England U-19 pacer Tim Bresnan then struck back with three wickets in four balls to leave Lancashire all out for 379 at stumps on the first day. Yorkshire's 335 in reply included solid innings from Phil Jaques, Craig White and Michael Lumb, while Lancashire's James Anderson took four wickets. Lancashire declared their second innings at 337 for 5, built around a patient 112 from Chilton, and that set Yorkshire 382 for victory. Yorkshire fell to 182 for 8 before a resistant 64 not out from Matthew Hoggard (only his second half-century of his career) saved the draw, as he shared partnerships of 45 for the ninth wicket with Richard Dawson and 46 for the tenth with Deon Kruis.

=== Leicestershire v Yorkshire (12 June) ===
Leicestershire (4pts) beat Yorkshire (0pts) by 7 wickets

In a low-scoring match at Grace Road, Yorkshire recorded 172 for 9, despite Anthony McGrath and Michael Lumb pairing up for 67 for the third wicket. Apart from those two, though, none of the Yorkshire batsmen could contribute, and slow accumulation from the Leicestershire batsmen was the key to reaching the target. Dinesh Mongia then took on Yorkshire's bowlers, adding 46 off 38 balls, as singles were taken near the end to see the hosts to the target with seventeen deliveries left in the match.

=== Yorkshire v Lancashire (22 June) ===
Lancashire (2pts) beat Yorkshire (0pts) by five wickets

Phil Jaques, an Australian, was the dominant figure for the Yorkshire Phoenix in the Roses battle, scoring 72 from number three before being out to countryman Brad Hodge. That lifted the hosts to 165 for 7, but that was not enough to defend. Matthew Hoggard, the England Test bowler, showed an uncanny knack of being uneconomical, conceding 65 runs in his four overs, and despite two wickets he lost the game for the Phoenix. Brad Hodge ended with 64 not out for the visiting Lancashire Lightning as they won with seventeen balls to spare.

=== Nottinghamshire v Yorkshire (26 June) ===
Yorkshire (2pts) beat Nottinghamshire (0pts) by two wickets

Tim Bresnan's onslaught of fast bowling resulted in three quick wickets for Yorkshire Phoenix, yet he was only called upon to bowl three overs – for 22 runs – and Nottinghamshire Outlaws were let off the hook. Chris Read top-scored with 43 off 35, propelling the hosts to 170 for 8. An excellent start by Ian Harvey and Michael Lumb sent Yorkshire to 60 for 1, as Harvey found boundaries seemingly at will – when he was out for 74 (with 64 of them in boundaries), however, Yorkshire imploded from 121 for 2 to 135 for 6. Craig White and Ismail Dawood fought back, and number 10 Richard Dawson won them the match with a two and a four, as Yorkshire needed four runs from the last three deliveries of the game.

=== Yorkshire v Derbyshire (28 June) ===
Yorkshire (2pts) beat Derbyshire (0pts) by six wickets

A high-scoring game at Headingley saw both sides score at run-rates in excess of 9. Derbyshire Phantoms batted first, with Jonathan Moss notching up 83 off just 44 balls – that's nearly two runs from every ball – and England Test bowler Matthew Hoggard was hit for 45 runs in three overs. Tim Bresnan, however, continued to like the short format, as he took three for 26 in four overs. In reply, Yorkshire Phoenix reaped the benefits of a massive partnership between Australians Ian Harvey (who made 109, the first Twenty20 century of the season) and Phil Jaques who shared a 124-run stand for the second wicket. Michael Lumb and Bresnan then kept the run rate up, and Yorkshire reached 198 for 4 with an over left in the game to clinch victory.

=== Yorkshire v Durham (30 June) ===
Durham (2pts) beat Yorkshire (0pts) by two wickets

Durham Dynamos won a low-scoring game at Headingley as both these sides looked to wave goodbye to a quarter-final spot. Yorkshire Phoenix were sent in to bat, but struggled to score runs, falling to 12 for three early on. Durham captain Dale Benkenstein bowled himself for two overs to take three wickets for 10, and that spell set Yorkshire back sufficiently to limit them to 123 for 7 – despite a total of 10 extras. Matthew Hoggard and Tim Bresnan then took three quick wickets between them to reduce Durham to 15 for 3, but despite eight wickets falling in the Durham innings, Phil Mustard's 31 and an identical score from No. 8 Gary Scott was enough to lift them to 124 for 8 with an over remaining.

=== Lancashire v Yorkshire (1 July) ===
Lancashire (2pts) beat Yorkshire (0pts) by 110 runs

Lancashire Lightning recorded the most emphatic victory by runs in the 2005 Twenty20 season, as they had fun with the Yorkshire Phoenix bowlers. After being put in to bat, Mal Loye and Stuart Law put on 106 for the first wicket, and when Loye departed for 47 Brad Hodge followed up with a 17-ball 33, a partnership of 77 with Law. Despite Ian Harvey digging into them with two wickets, the early run-rate ensured that Lancashire set a target of 208, Law recording the second Twenty20 century this season – in 56 balls. Ian Harvey, the man responsible for the first of those centuries, was out early for 1, and wickets fell to everyone as Yorkshire were out for 97 – Dominic Cork taking three for 10, Muttiah Muralitharan three for 17, and James Anderson two for 26. Matthew Hoggard and Tim Bresnan recorded the highest partnership for Yorkshire, with 22 for the tenth wicket.

=== Yorkshire v Nottinghamshire (3 July) ===
Nottinghamshire (2pts) beat Yorkshire (0pts) by six wickets

Nottinghamshire won the toss at Headingley and put Yorkshire into bat. The hosts suffered an immediate setback when Ian Harvey was out from the first ball to Andrew Harris, but Craig White and Phil Jaques settled the ship, with Jaques going on to score 55 off 33 balls. Rich Pyrah finished the innings with 31 off 17 as Yorkshire set their guests a target of 181 to win. The start of Nottinghamshire's innings was the opposite to Yorkshire's: openers Will Smith (55) and Graeme Swann (62) put on 101 before they were parted, as Swann slashed nine fours, three sixes, and also had time to run eight times across the pitch in a 25-ball frenzy. Yorkshire took the next four wickets for 50 runs, with leg spinner Mark Lawson grabbing two, and with a high total to chase the game was in the balance. However, Chris Read's 28 off 18 balls saw Nottinghamshire home with just two balls to go.

=== Durham v Yorkshire (4 July) ===
Yorkshire (2pts) beat Durham (0pts) by 40 runs

Yorkshire Phoenix got their first win in three Twenty20 games, but the quarter-finals still looked out of sight, as they needed to win their last game and Derbyshire lose their last. Batting first, Ian Harvey, Craig White and Phil Jaques all made scores between 40 and 60, to lift Yorkshire to 126 for 1 at one point. Off-spinner Gary Scott and medium-pacer Dale Benkenstein took three wickets between them, but Yorkshire still managed 171 for 7. Durham Dynamos looked in the game when Benkenstein and Gordon Muchall were at the crease, pairing up for 79 for the fourth wicket, but a burst of wickets – thanks to Richard Dawson and Anthony McGrath's bowling – sent Durham to the ropes at 111 for 8. Twelve minutes later, it was all over for 131, with 17 deliveries remaining. Yorkshire's 30-year-old seam bowler Adam Warren took two for 32 on Twenty20 debut.

=== Leicestershire v Yorkshire (6 July) ===
Leicestershire (2pts) beat Yorkshire (0pts) by seven wickets

With a lot of luck with other results, Yorkshire Phoenix could have qualified for the quarter-finals with a win in this game against Leicestershire Foxes. However, as Ian Harvey's support batsmen failed to score at more than three an over until Anthony McGrath came in at five with the scoreboard on 84 for 3, their innings was eventually worth just 177 for 5 – Harvey making 77 of those and McGrath 33. In reply, opening batsman Darren Maddy anchored the innings with 72 not out, and Jeremy Snape saw off the required runs as he hit 39 off 23 balls and the Foxes won with nine balls and seven wickets to spare. Leicestershire, who needed a tie or better to be completely assured of the quarter-final spot, thus went through.

=== Worcestershire v Yorkshire (8–11 July) ===
Yorkshire (20pts) beat Worcestershire (4pts) by three wickets

Yorkshire closed the gap to the promotion spots from 6.5 to 1.5 points after a three-wicket win at New Road over Worcestershire. Matthew Hoggard got a good return to form after being smashed out of the Twenty20 format with an economy rate of 11, taking three for 68 in Worcestershire's first innings, yet the hosts made 345 before being bowled out shortly before stumps on day 1. Rich Pyrah, playing his first first-class game of the season, and Craig White then rescued Yorkshire from 113 for 4 with fifties, but Nadeem Malik and Kabir Ali finished with three wickets each to get them all out for 300, trailing by 45. Then, Tim Bresnan took two early wickets before stumps, and continued on day three to end with career-best figures of five for 42. However, another England prospect, Kabir Ali, took four more wickets, as Yorkshire were 222 for 6 overnight – needing 46 runs to win. They lost wicket-keeper Ismail Dawood early, but were not pegged back further, and Richard Dawson made 51 not out to lead them to the target. Worcestershire were also docked two points for a slow over rate.

=== Yorkshire v Surrey (13 July) ===
Surrey (4pts) beat Yorkshire (0pts) by three runs

Yorkshire Phoenix failed to convert a good position against Surrey Lions, who moved off last place in the table with a win. Having initially been placed in the field by Surrey's captain Mark Ramprakash, they conceded 111 for the first wicket, James Benning and Jonathan Batty making 72 and 41 respectively. A burst of three wickets from Richard Dawson's off-spin sent Surrey struggling at 127 for 4, but Ramprakash paired up with Rikki Clarke to recover, and Clarke then unleashed a late cameo off Ian Harvey to end with 90 not out off 71 balls to see Surrey to a final total of 264 for 7. In reply, Yorkshire looked confident at 222 for 2, recovering from the early shock of losing Matthew Wood for a golden duck. However, a couple of run-outs and a wicket from Tim Murtagh saw Tim Bresnan face the last ball with Yorkshire needing four to win – he was bowled by Nayan Doshi, and Surrey won by three runs, despite conceding 15 wides.

=== Yorkshire v Northamptonshire (16 July) ===
Yorkshire beat Northamptonshire by 33 runs to progress to the Semi-Final of the C&G Trophy

Michael Lumb with 89 and Ian Harvey with 74 lifted Yorkshire to 270 all out at Headingley in the fourth quarter-final of the C&G Trophy. It was a bit of an implosion from 227 for 3, but runs came thick and fast in that period, so Yorkshire wouldn't be too disappointed with losing their wickets. Northamptonshire started well, getting to 163 for 2 after all their top four got starts, but two wickets from England Test bowler Matthew Hoggard started to turn the match. From then on, the Northamptonshire effort just stopped dead, as they lost five wickets for 24 runs to fall to 216 for 9. Steffan Jones and Jason Brown paired up for 21 for the last wicket, but it was too little, too late.

=== Yorkshire v Leicestershire (20–23 July) ===
Yorkshire (17pts) beat Leicestershire (7pts) by six wickets

Australian Chris Rogers continued his fine run of form as his 93 gave Leicestershire a good start, which Ottis Gibson and Claude Henderson exploited by scoring 127 for the eighth wicket to lift Leicestershire to 366 all out. South African Deon Kruis got the four lowest-batting batsmen to end with respectable figures of four for 90, but Yorkshire did not use their innings well, as Gibson, Charl Willoughby and Stuart Broad took three wickets each and Yorkshire crumbled to 187.

Tim Bresnan then removed both the openers for ducks, but John Maunders and Chris Rogers made healthy knocks to take Leicestershire to a somewhat respectable 217 for a sizeable target – while Richard Dawson took four for 54 and Tim Bresnan added another man to his tally and finished with three for 44. Michael Wood and Joe Sayers set Yorkshire on track to chasing the target of 397, pairing up for 115 before Wood was caught out for 70, and Yorkshire were 132 for 1 overnight, setting up an intriguing chase. And, as in May when the teams met at Grace Road and Yorkshire chased a club record 406, Yorkshire recovered from a dismal first innings to take the victory. Sayers made 104, Anthony McGrath 55, and Ian Harvey an unbeaten 54 as Yorkshire reached the target, making their second highest fourth innings total to win in their 142-year history until this match – and both of those were against Leicestershire in 2005.

=== Yorkshire v Warwickshire (24 July) ===
Warwickshire (4pts) beat Yorkshire (0pts) by seven wickets

Yorkshire Phoenix were tied down by Warwickshire Bears bowlers Dougie Brown and Alex Loudon, as the Phoenix only managed to post 201 for 7 at Scarborough. Brown took one for 32 and Loudon one for 23 off nine overs each, Michael Lumb being restricted to 57 off 86 balls as top scorer for Yorkshire. Two early wickets from Neil Carter also helped the Warwickshire fielding effort. In reply, Carter smacked six sixes and five fours, taking 38 balls to make 65, and Jonathan Trott and Jamie Troughton took Warwickshire to the target with seven wickets and just over seven overs to spare, as Yorkshire's losing streak in the National League was extended to three matches.

=== Yorkshire v Derbyshire (26–29 July) ===
Yorkshire (12pts) drew with Derbyshire (11pts)

Phil Jaques and Anthony McGrath lifted Yorkshire with a third-wicket partnership of 310, 13 off the county record set in 1928, and although Jaques only added two to his overnight score of 217 before he was out caught, Yorkshire still amassed 570 thanks mainly to Ian Harvey and Craig White. Derbyshire spinners Ant Botha and Andy Gray got cheap wickets towards the end, as White was left stranded on 67 not out with the lower-order making insignificant contributions. However, Chris Silverwood and Richard Dawson chipped away at the Derbyshire batting line-up, taking two wickets each as Michael Di Venuto was fairly alone with his 79 and Derbyshire made their way to 247 for 7 at stumps on day 2. That turned out to be the score at the end of day 3 as well, rain preventing any play as the match moved closer to a draw. Derbyshire's late-order battled for another thirty overs before they were bundled out for 350, and despite Deon Kruis snaring two early wickets in the follow on, Derbyshire survived 60 overs to make 173 for 5 at the end of day four and save the draw.

=== Yorkshire v Kent (31 July) ===
Kent (4pts) beat Yorkshire (0pts) by five wickets

In the mid-table battle in Division Two, Yorkshire Phoenix went down despite an unbeaten 116 from England captain Michael Vaughan. Yorkshire were missing Ian Harvey for this game, and it showed, as no other batsman passed 30 and Vaughan was woefully alone in getting the target up. It was eventually set at 217 for Kent Spitfires, and as Matthew Walker found his rhythm to hit seven fours in an unbeaten 56, Kent got to that target with five wickets and four balls to spare, despite Vaughan's off-breaks yielding two wickets for 42 runs.

=== Yorkshire v Bangladesh A (3–5 August) ===
Yorkshire won by 126 runs

A second-string Yorkshire pummeled the Bangladeshi bowlers, and despite the short timeframe – three days instead of the County Championship's four – they still got a win. With a run-rate of more than four an over they quickly made their way to 357 for 2 on the first day – Matthew Wood made an unbeaten 202, five short of his career highest score, and shared an opening partnership worth 272 with Joe Sayers. In reply, Tushar Imran made his second first-class century on tour, and the fifth of his career, with 116 in a little over three hours, and 19-year-old Nazimuddin made 60 as the tourists made their way to 325 – left-armer David Lucas taking five for 49. Yorkshire lost two wickets before stumps to be 48 for 2, but Michael Lumb made a century on the final day to ensure continued Yorkshire domination as they declared on 240 for 2, setting Bangladesh a target of 273 in three and a half hours. Lucas continued on his fine form from the first innings, taking three wickets, and no Bangladeshi passed 30 as they succumbed for 146 – Lucas took three for 35, fellow left-armer David Wainwright took three for 22 with his spin, and even part-time medium-pacer Rich Pyrah got one wicket in his two overs.

=== Scotland v Yorkshire (7 August) ===
Yorkshire (4pts) beat Scotland (0pts) by five wickets

Scotland Saltires ran Yorkshire Phoenix close in the National League game at Edinburgh, but failed to capitalise on a good start and were eventually beaten by five wickets. Having been put in to bat, Fraser Watts and Jonathan Beukes paired up for 77 for the first wicket, and Beukes went on to make 78. However, six Scottish batsmen were dismissed in single figures, Deon Kruis took three for 27, and the Scots were limited to 203 for 9. John Blain, who have played internationals for Scotland, turned out for Yorkshire, but conceded 34 runs in five overs. Yorkshire lost an early wicket in Craig White, who was bowled by Yasir Arafat for 2, but with five batsmen going into double figures and Phil Jaques recording 57, the Phoenix made it to the target with 21 balls to spare, despite good figures of two wickets for 23 from Beukes.

=== Somerset v Yorkshire (10–13 August) ===
Somerset (12pts) drew with Yorkshire (11pts)

Yorkshire and Somerset fought out a high-scoring draw at Taunton. Having opted to bat first, the visitors lost Joe Sayers for a duck, but Phil Jaques and Michael Lumb made centuries to see Yorkshire to 368 for 4. Then, Charl Langeveldt took the wickets of Craig White and Lumb, and Deon Kruis edged Andy Caddick behind for a duck to leave Yorkshire 377 for 7 overnight. Caddick wrapped up the innings on the second morning, finishing with six for 96, before Somerset opener Michael Wood started notching up boundaries. He made 35 fours and one six in a nine-hour cameo which yielded a total of 297 – before he was caught by Tim Bresnan 14 short of Somerset's highest innings for the season. With help from Ian Blackwell, who made 62, and Keith Parsons' 94, Somerset amassed 581 in a day and a half. Caddick got an early breakthrough for Somerset, but Sayers and Anthony McGrath defied them, with a 119-run partnership for the second wicket. Only six overs of play was possible on day four before rain set in to ensure a drawn game.

=== Somerset v Yorkshire (14 August) ===
Somerset (4pts) beat Yorkshire (0pts) by two runs

In a high-scoring match at The County Ground, Taunton, Matthew Wood and Ian Blackwell both cracked centuries as Somerset Sabres made their way to 345 for 4. Blackwell's 114 came off just 61 balls, with a total of 74 runs in boundaries. Paul Jaques, Ismail Dawood and Michael Wood all made half-centuries, but in the end Yorkshire Phoenix needed 23 to win off the last over, number 11 Deon Kruis facing Blackwell. The first ball was a dot ball, but a six and three fours followed – however, Kruis needed four for the tie and six for the win on the last ball. He couldn't get the ball to the boundary, and Somerset prevailed by two runs.

=== Lancashire v Yorkshire (16–19 August) ===
Lancashire (11pts) drew with Yorkshire (11pts)

Craig White and Matthew Wood gave Yorkshire control of the first day of the Roses clash against Lancashire. Wood made 86 and White 110 not out, while the Lancashire captain Mark Chilton was stumped for options and had to turn to part-time spinner Marcus North for seven overs of bowling – which yielded the wicket of Ismail Dawood. Thanks to hard hitting from Deon Kruis, who finished with 35, Yorkshire ended their innings on 417 after 125 overs, James Anderson taking the number 10 and 11 to end with three wickets, the same number as Glen Chapple. Lancashire set about chasing the total with a massive opening partnership between Chilton and Iain Sutcliffe – the pair added 223 and battered Chris Silverwood out of the attack, as the opening bowler was left with 13 of Yorkshire's 157.1 overs.

Sutcliffe was eventually dismissed seven runs short of a century, caught by wicket-keeper Dawood off Tim Bresnan's bowling, and Bresnan got another wicket when he trapped Mal Loye lbw. Bresnan and Deon Kruis were Yorkshire's best bowlers, sharing nine of the ten wickets, and starting with Sutcliffe's dismissal, Lancashire lost five wickets for 27 runs to Bresnan and Kruis. However, 146 from Andrew Symonds, and half-centuries from Dominic Cork and Warren Hegg gave Lancashire a 120-run lead. Yorkshire batted to stumps on day three without loss, and survived 89 overs on the fourth day with ease. Craig White, Anthony McGrath and Matthew Wood all made fifties for Yorkshire, while no Lancashire bowler got more than one wicket. Yorkshire remained 2.5 points ahead of Lancashire in the Championship table, but were third following Essex' victory over Derbyshire.

=== Hampshire v Yorkshire (20 August) ===
Hampshire beat Yorkshire by eight wickets to progress to the C&G Trophy Final

Yorkshire never managed to score in the semi-final match at The Rose Bowl, which meant that Hampshire were set a relatively easy target of 198 to win. Michael Lumb top-scored with 43, but the late order failed to score runs quickly enough to get past 200; number ten John Blain only made six off 20 deliveries, while number nine Tim Bresnan made three off ten. Yorkshireman Deon Kruis served up some economical bowling early on to John Crawley, and bowled him for a 28-ball 8, but a 147-run partnership between Nic Pothas and Sean Ervine saw Hampshire right on track, as they won with over 10 overs to spare. Ervine made his second List A century, off 96 balls, but was caught and bowled by Richard Dawson three balls later. It did nt matter much – Hampshire only needed 20 runs to win, and Shane Watson and Nic Pothas knocked them off to book Hampshire's place in the C&G Trophy final.

=== Yorkshire v Durham (24–27 August) ===
Yorkshire (12pts) drew with Durham (11pts)

Michael Hussey and Paul Collingwood led Durham to a healthy total against the Yorkshire bowlers in the 40 overs possible on the first day at Scarborough. Hussey ended the day on 85 not out as Durham made their way to 140 for 1. Deon Kruis and Tim Bresnan got one wicket each in the morning, but Durham fought back with Gordon Muchall and Dale Benkenstein adding 157 for the fourth wicket. Durham were eventually bowled out midway through day three, having made a total of 414. Kruis took five wickets and Bresnan four, but they both conceded more than 100 runs in the process. Yorkshire opted for batting practice, batting out the last day and a half to make 475 for 6, with Paul Jaques scoring 172. Paul Collingwood took three for 56 for Durham, but could not help them to an extra bowling point, and with no possibility of taking the third extra point Durham's captain Hussey agreed to a draw after Yorkshire's 129th over.

=== Yorkshire v Derbyshire (28 August) ===
Derbyshire (4pts) beat Yorkshire (0pts) by five wickets

Graeme Welch and Andre Botha tugged Derbyshire Phantoms back to victory from 119 for 5 chasing 220 to win, as the pair shared an unbeaten 102-run partnership at Scarborough after Deon Kruis and Richard Dawson had taken out early wickets. It was Yorkshire Phoenix who batted first, Michael Lumb top-scoring with 69 while Australian Jon Moss dug out four for 28 in his nine overs. Yorkshire finished with 219 for 8, but their bowlers replied well to have Derbyshire on the rack when Travis Friend was run out to leave them on 85 for 4. Fifties from Welch and Botha turned the match around, however, and Derbyshire won by five wickets.

=== Kent v Yorkshire (30 August) ===
Kent (4pts) beat Yorkshire (0pts) by six wickets

Kent Spitfires made their way to a fairly comfortable victory against Yorkshire Phoenix, who had opted to bat first after winning the toss. However, all the Kent bowlers got at least one wicket, and the Yorkshire batsmen couldn't convert their starts, as six batsmen were out with scores between 10 and 25. Kent's Andrew Hall bowled three maiden overs and took two wickets to end with the best figures of two for 19, but four bowlers grabbed two wickets each as Yorkshire were bowled out for 164. Kent were never seriously threatened in reply, as Hall put on 64 with Darren Stevens for the third wicket, and Justin Kemp had fun at the end to hit 42 not out off just 25 balls and take Kent to victory in just over two thirds of the allotted overs. Yorkshire medium pacer Ian Harvey suffered the most from Kemp's blade, conceding 40 runs in four overs.

=== Yorkshire v Leicestershire (4 September) ===
Leicestershire (4pts) beat Yorkshire (0pts) by 133 runs

Leicestershire Foxes were put in to bat at Headingley, and after their top five all passed into double figures, Leicestershire made their way to 251 for 8 as Darren Maddy and Aftab Habib made half-centuries. Yorkshire Phoenix spinner and captain Richard Dawson had three men caught for 41 runs to end with the best bowling figures for Yorkshire. Leicestershire's Ottis Gibson also got three wickets, but at a cheaper rate, as the Phoenix fell to 57 for 7. Dawson hung about with wicket-keeper Simon Guy, but Jeremy Snape ended the innings with two wickets to bowl Yorkshire out for 120. Guy was the only batsman to pass 25, despite batting at nine.

=== Yorkshire v Worcestershire (7–10 September) ===
Yorkshire (10pts) drew with Worcestershire (8pts)

Rain wrecked the match at Headingley, a match which would probably have ended in a result if the normal 400 overs of play were possible instead of the 221.4 actually available. Although no batsman passed 50, Worcestershire accumulated 308 in 85 overs. Tim Bresnan took three wickets for 45 with his pace, while Australian Mark Cleary, playing in his first game for Yorkshire after a season with Leicestershire in 2004, had to be content with one man – Pakistani bowler Shoaib Akhtar – while conceding 70. Anthony McGrath batted almost without support in Yorkshire's first innings, but his five-hour unbeaten 173 sent Yorkshire to a total of 317, despite struggling at 190 for 7 before Richard Dawson stepped in to make 49. Kabir Ali took four for 79 for Worcestershire, Nadeem Malik got three and Gareth Batty two, but they couldn't prevent the hosts racking up a nine-run lead.

Worcestershire were then shaken by South African Deon Kruis who took the first three wickets in a frantic last session. Worcestershire hit at nearly a run a ball, ending the day with 126 off 24 overs, but lost four wickets in the process. Only 40 overs of play were possible on the third day, as Australians Cleary and Ian Harvey bowled Worcestershire out for 211. Yorkshire set about chasing 203 at a rapid pace, losing Matthew Wood and Joe Sayers but still making 125 for 2 in 25 overs before rain set in, shortening the day's play to five overs and ruining Yorkshire's chances as they needed 78 more with 8 wickets in hand. Worcestershire were later deducted two points for a slow over rate.

=== Yorkshire v Durham (11 September) ===
Durham (4pts) beat Yorkshire (0pts) by seven wickets

Gordon Muchall's maiden List A century, an unbeaten 101 off 107 balls, boosted Durham Dynamos to their third straight one-day victory, gaining them promotion from Division Two. Yorkshire Phoenix batted first, however, and fifties from Michael Lumb and the in-form Anthony McGrath gave them a total of 237 for 6, despite Callum Thorp bowling seven overs for only 22 runs. Yorkshire got off to a good start when bowling, having Gavin Hamilton caught for 5, but without Tim Bresnan and Deon Kruis, Yorkshire struggled to take wickets, and Durham won with ten balls to spare.

=== Derbyshire v Yorkshire (14 September) ===
Derbyshire (4pts) beat Yorkshire (0pts) by five wickets

Yorkshire Phoenix won the toss and chose to bat, and immediately lost both openers at Derby. That set the pace of the innings, and seven maiden overs were bowled out of the total of 45. Jonathan Moss got the best bowling figures for the hosting Derbyshire Phantoms, removing Rich Pyrah and Simon Guy in successive balls and ending with bowling figures of 9–2–27–3. Moss' two wickets set Yorkshire back to 66 for 7, and only a rearguard between Joe Sayers, who made 54 not out in two hours, and David Lucas saw them bat out the allotted overs. The pair added 65 for the ninth wicket as Yorkshire closed on 171 for 9. Derbyshire lost Michael Di Venuto for 1 early on, but despite Anthony McGrath removing Hassan Adnan for 57 and Luke Sutton for 34, Derbyshire made it to the target with fourteen balls. Extras were the second-highest scorer, with 43, including 31 wides.

=== Derbyshire v Yorkshire (16–19 September) ===
Yorkshire (12pts) drew with Derbyshire (7pts)

Yorkshire, a team chasing points in their attempt to promote from Division Two of the County Championship, racked up a 304-run lead on first innings against Derbyshire, yet failed to win. However, the 12 points earned gave them promotion from Division Two. Winning the toss and batting first, Yorkshire relied on Australians Mark Cleary and Ian Harvey to take wickets, as Cleary ended with three for 46 and Harvey with five for 40. Harvey got his first five-for of the season as Derbyshire were bowled out for 216, while Steve Stubbings was the only batsman to pass 30. Matthew Wood and Joe Sayers then added 113 for the first wicket to put Yorkshire just 103 behind with all wickets intact at the end of the first day's play. On the second morning, Durham got four wickets for 101 before Anthony McGrath and Ian Harvey smacked centuries in a two-and-a-half-hour partnership worth 156. Yorkshire were eventually bowled out at stumps on day two, having made their way to a lead of 304, despite Ant Botha wrapping up the tail to take four for 90.

Steve Stubbings gave Derbyshire a good start with a four-and-a-half-hour 91, leading Derbyshire to 216 for 4, but Mark Lawson set Derbyshire back with his leg spin, which reduced Derbyshire from 216 for 4 to 233 for 7. However, Botha and Tim Lungley added 133 for the seventh wicket, Botha recording his highest career score as his four hours at the crease yielded an unbeaten score of 156. Lawson wrapped up the Derbyshire innings, ending with five for 155 as Derbyshire were bowled out for 523, having added 290 for the last three wickets. Still, Yorkshire only required 220 in 59 overs, but Botha tied them down – in a marathon 23-over spell after coming on as first change bowler, Botha only conceded 20 runs and took two wickets – helping as Yorkshire lost their first six wickets for 82. Joe Sayers and Simon Guy then batted for three quarters of an hour to save the draw for Yorkshire.

=== Warwickshire v Yorkshire (20 September) ===
Warwickshire (4pts) beat Yorkshire (0pts) by 102 runs

Yorkshire Phoenix conceded 309 for 3 after winning the toss and fielding first at Edgbaston despite Scotsman John Blain taking two early wickets to leave the hosts Warwickshire Bears at 49 for 2. Jonathan Trott and Ian Bell struck 216 runs together, with Bell being the most destructive – he hit eight fours and five sixes in an 84-ball century, and added a further 37 before Yorkshire wicket-keeper Simon Guy finally had him stumped. With Jamie Troughton smacking three sixes and two fours in a 13-ball 34, Warwickshire made 309 for 3 in their 45 overs, the sixth highest total in Division Two this season. Yorkshire attempted the chase, with Michael Wood and Anthony McGrath hitting at just under a run a ball, but after McGrath's dismissal Yorkshire lost five wickets for 34, and only just managed to bat out their 45 overs, scoring 207 for 9. Alex Loudon and Neil Carter took three wickets each.

=== Northamptonshire v Yorkshire (21–24 September) ===
Northamptonshire (21pts) beat Yorkshire (3pts) by an innings and 21 runs

Northamptonshire spinners Jason Brown and Monty Panesar shared all ten Yorkshire wickets on the first day at Northampton. Yorkshire had won the toss and recorded a 66-run opening stand when the spinners first broke through, Panesar having Matthew Wood caught by Robin White. The rest was one of classic spin bowling – few runs and the occasional wicket – Panesar conceded just over one run an over (ending with figures of 27.5–11–32–5), and the average run rate for the innings was just above two. Former England all-rounder Craig White added 51 as Yorkshire were bowled out for 177. Early wickets from Deon Kruis reduced Northamptonshire to 34 for 2, but a three-hour stand of 220 across two days between Martin Love and Usman Afzaal took Northamptonshire to a lead of 77 with seven wickets in hand when Love fell for 95. Afzaal pushed on, making 157 before being dismissed by Kruis – who took five for 75 – and a 76-run partnership between Simon Crook and Panesar took Northamptonshire to 476 for 9 before the declaration came. Crook fell three short of a maiden first-class century, while Yorkshire leg spinner Mark Lawson was taken for 150 in 30 overs.

Yorkshire's scoring rate was, again, slow, and their second innings yielded 278 runs in nearly nine hours – though it was also frequently interrupted by rain. Panesar took the first five wickets, and despite partnerships of 50 for the seventh and eight wicket, Brown ended Yorkshire's innings with five of his own. The two spinners bowled 96.5 overs out of a total of 109.5 overs served up by Northamptonshire bowlers in the second innings, and ended with uncannily similar second-innings bowling analyses: Brown 50.5–14–95–5, Panesar 46–15–96–5. Brown and Panesar also split the 20 wickets equally between them – the second time in the history of the first-class game that this feat had occurred, and the first in 100 years.

=== Sussex v Yorkshire (25 September) ===
Sussex (4pts) beat Yorkshire (0pts) by eight wickets

Sussex Sharks sealed the National League Division Two title by fielding first and bowling Yorkshire Phoenix out for 99. Only wicket-keeper Simon Guy passed 20, as Yorkshire fell in two periods – first to 37 for 5 thanks to three wickets from Luke Wright, and then, after Guy, Anthony McGrath and Mark Cleary had taken them to 90 for 6, they lost their last four men for nine runs. Sussex captain Chris Adams took his time in the reply, using 83 balls to hit 49 as Sussex' batsmen rode home to an eight-wicket victory.
