= Yorkshire County Cricket Club in 2007 =

English cricket club season

In the 2007 season, the English cricket club Yorkshire was placed sixth in the County Championship, winning 4 of their 16 matches and drawing 8.

== Championship ==
County Championship Division One Final Table
Pos	Team	Pld	W	D	L	Pen	Bat	Bowl	Pts
1	Sussex	16	7	6	3	0	37	43	202
2	Durham	16	7	4	5	1.5	38	47	197.5
3	Lancashire	16	5	9	2	0	40	44	190
4	Surrey	16	5	7	4	1	41	40	178
5	Hampshire	16	5	8	3	0	32	43	177
6	Yorkshire	16	4	8	4	0	49	38	175
7	Kent	16	3	8	5	0	43	36	153
8	Warwickshire	16	2	9	5	0	40	35	139
9	Worcestershire	16	1	7	8	0	18	35	95

== Pro40 ==
Natwest Pro40 Division 2
Pos	Team	Pld	W	L	NR	T	RR	Pts
1	Durham Dynamos	8	6	2	0	0	1.31	12
2	Somerset Sabres	8	5	2	1	0	0.55	11
3	Middlesex Crusaders	8	5	3	0	0	0.48	10
4	Surrey Lions	8	5	3	0	0	0.38	10
5	Kent Spitfires	8	5	3	0	0	0.26	10
6	Yorkshire Phoenix	8	4	3	1	0	0.05	9
7	Leicestershire Foxes	8	3	4	1	0	-0.27	7
8	Derbyshire Phantoms	8	1	7	0	0	-0.92	2
9	Glamorgan Dragons	8	0	7	1	0	-2.35	2

== Friends Provident ==
Friends Provident Trophy - North Conference
Pos	Team	Pld	W	L	NR	T	RR	Pts
1	Durham Dynamos	9	7	2	0	0	0.87	14
2	Warwickshire Bears	9	6	1	2	0	0.71	14
3	Nottinghamshire Outlaws	9	6	2	1	0	0.81	13
4	Worcestershire Royals	9	4	3	2	0	0.21	10
5	Yorkshire Phoenix	9	4	3	2	0	0.09	10
6	Leicestershire Foxes	9	4	3	2	0	-0.31	10
7	Lancashire Lightning	9	3	5	1	0	-0.63	7
8	Derbyshire Phantoms	9	2	6	1	0	-0.25	5
9	Northamptonshire Steelbacks	9	1	6	2	0	-0.73	4
10	Scotland Saltires	9	1	7	1	0	-1.05	3

== County Championship Scorecards ==
Surrey v Yorkshire

6 June - 9 June
(Scorecard)

Yorkshire	v	Surrey
594-9 dec (154 overs); Jason Gillespie 123* (192); Azhar Mahmood 3/73 (27 overs)		344 (84 overs); Scott Newman 124 (163); Adil Rashid 4/105 (24 overs)
266-7 dec (58.1 overs); Craig White 117 (131); Nayan Doshi 6/111 (21.1 overs)		170 (50.3 overs); Scott Newman 89 (118); Matthew Hoggard 4/34 (12 overs)

Yorkshire won by 346 runs
The Oval, Kennington, England
Umpires: TE Jesty and RT Robinson

- Points: Surrey 5, Yorkshire 22

Yorkshire v Durham

25 April - 27 April
(Scorecard)

Durham	v	Yorkshire
274 (75.4 overs); Dale Benkenstein 83 (128); Adil Rashid 5/88 (20.4 overs)		414 (142.3 overs); Joe Sayers 149* (417); Steve Harmison 6/87 (37.3 overs)
169 (39.1 overs); Graham Onions 41 (33); Matthew Hoggard 5/32 (11.1 overs)		30-1 (6.3 overs); Joe Sayers 10* (20); Steve Harmison 1/7 (3 overs)

Yorkshire won by 9 wickets
Headingley Cricket Ground, Leeds, England
Umpires: NGC Cowley and SA Garratt

- Points: Surrey 5, Yorkshire 22

Hampshire v Yorkshire

6 June - 9 June
(Scorecard)

Yorkshire	v	Hampshire
299 (93.4 overs); Younis Khan 106 (151); James Bruce 4/56 (20 overs)		296 (95.3 overs); Michael Brown 105 (159); Tim Bresnan 4/65 (22 overs)
439-4 dec (106.5 overs); Younis Khan 202* (290); Stuart Clark 3/83 (22.5 overs)		366-8 (105 overs); James Adams 90 (188); Younis Khan 4/52 (18 overs)

Match Drawn
Rose Bowl, Southampton, England
Umpires: B Dudleston and RK Illingworth

- Points: Hampshire 9, Yorkshire 9

Yorkshire v Worcestershire

9 May - 12 May
(Scorecard)

Yorkshire	v	Worcestershire
521-7 dec (153 overs); Jacques Rudolph 129 (191); Dewald Nel 4/74 (27 overs)		129 (42.5 overs); Phil Jaques 38 (57); Matthew Hoggard 5/34 (14 overs)
		132 (f/o) (55 overs); Steven Davies 38 (70); Tim Bresnan 4/10 (10 overs)

Yorkshire won by an innings and 260 runs
Headingley Cricket Ground, Leeds, England
Umpires: MJ Harris and JW Lloyds

- Points: Yorkshire 22, Worcestershire 2

Yorkshire v Worcestershire

23 May - 26 May
(Scorecard)

Yorkshire	v	Durham
393 (115 overs); Jacques Rudolph 111 (190); Ottis Gibson 7/81 (28 overs)		481 (126.5 overs); Kyle Coetzer 91 (170); Jason Gillespie 3/73 (25 overs)
218 (59.2 overs); Jacques Rudolph 79 (112); Graham Onions 5/53 (15.2 overs)		131-4 (33.5 overs); Michael Di Venuto 53 (65); Darren Gough 2/18 (9 overs)

Durham won by 6 wickets
Riverside Ground, Chester-le-Street, England
Umpires: G Sharp and JF Steele

- Points: Durham 22, Yorkshire 7

Kent v Yorkshire

6 June - 9 June
(Scorecard)

Yorkshire	v	Kent
551-8 dec (166.2 overs); Joe Sayers 187 (379); Darren Stevens 3/91 (27.2 overs)		292 (84.5 overs); Andrew Hall 77 (89); Darren Gough 6/47 (16.2 overs)
		383-6 (f/o) (129 overs); James Tredwell 116 (233); Tim Bresnan 2/82 (22 overs)

Match Drawn
Nevill Ground, Tunbridge Wells, England
Umpires: RK Illingworth and P Willey

- Points: Kent 7, Yorkshire 11

Yorkshire v Sussex

15 June - 18 June
(Scorecard)

Yorkshire	v	Sussex
139 (48.2 overs); Ajmal Shahzad 32* (49); Naved-ul-Hasan 3/34 (12 overs)		141 (56.4 overs); Chris Adams 29 (68); Ajmal Shahzad 4/22 (8.4 overs)
284-6 dec (108 overs); Anthony McGrath 58 (136); Darren Gough 2/37 (24 overs)		57-2 (22 overs); Michael Yardy 21* (60); Deon Kruis 1/15 (5 overs)

Match Drawn
Headingley Cricket Ground, Leeds, England
Umpires: IJ Gould and RA Kettleborough

- Points: Yorkshire 7, Sussex 7

Lancashire v Yorkshire

8 July - 11 July
(Scorecard)

Yorkshire	v	Lancashire
320 (110.3 overs); Michael Vaughan 74 (210); James Anderson 5/98 (33 overs)		247-6 (69 overs); Stuart Law 55 (61); Adil Rashid 5/114 (28 overs)

Match Drawn
Old Trafford, Manchester, England
Umpires: TE Jesty and NA Mallender

- Points: Lancashire 8, Yorkshire 9

Warwickshire v Yorkshire

13 July - 16 July
(Scorecard)

Yorkshire	v	Warwickshire
400-9 (128.4 overs); Anthony McGrath 188* (348); Naqash Tahir 4/93 (29 overs)		254-2 dec (57 overs); Darren Maddy 135 (161); Matthew Hoggard 1/43 (10 overs)

Match Drawn
Edgbaston, Birmingham, England
Umpires: PJ Hartley and RT Robinson

- Points: Warwickshire 9, Yorkshire 9

Yorkshire v Surrey

20 July - 23 July
(Scorecard)

Yorkshire	v	Surrey
307 (91.5 overs); Adil Rashid 91* (178); Matthew Nicholson 4/85 (24.5 overs)		229 (77.1 overs); Rikki Clarke 65 (104); Darren Gough 6/50 (21 overs)
2-1 (1.1 overs); Craig White 2 (2); Matthew Nicholson 1/2 (1 over)

Match Drawn
Headingley Cricket Ground, Leeds, England
Umpires: B Leadbeater and NJ Llong

- Points: Yorkshire 10, Surrey 8

Yorkshire v Kent

25 July - 28 July
(Scorecard)

Kent	v	Yorkshire
486 (124.3 overs); Joe Denly 114 (212); Adil Rashid 5/112 (23.3 overs)		550-9 dec (144.5 overs); Younis Khan 217* (252); Ryan McLaren 4/89 (28 overs)
17-0 (10 overs); Joe Denly 11 (37); Darren Gough 0/1 (3 overs)

Match Drawn
North Marine Road, Scarborough, England
Umpires: NL Bainton and GI Burgess

- Points: Yorkshire 12, Kent 11

Yorkshire v Lancashire

9 August - 11 August
(Scorecard)

Yorkshire	v	Lancashire
144 (55.5 overs); Tim Bresnan 39 (98); Glen Chapple 4/35 (14 overs)		517 (135.5 overs); Stuart Law 206 (250); Adil Rashid 3/109 (33 overs)
247 (67.4 overs); Jason Gillespie 44 (86); Muttiah Muralitharan 5/66 (24.4 overs)

Lancashire won by an innings and 126 runs
Headingley Cricket Ground, Leeds, England
Umpires: JW Holder and G Sharp

- Points: Yorkshire 2, Lancashire 22

Warwickshire v Yorkshire

14 August - 17 August
(Scorecard)

Yorkshire	v	Worcestershire
319 (73.5 overs); Adil Rashid 108 (152); Doug Bollinger 4/82 (16.5 overs)		172-5 dec (42 overs); Graham Hick 69* (65); Tim Bresnan 2/46 (12 overs)
188-5 dec (41.4 overs); Jacques Rudolph 92* (105); Kabir Ali 4/30 (10 overs)		337-4 (57 overs); Ben Smith 98* (102); Jason Gillespie 2/74 (11 overs)

Worcestershire won by 6 wickets
Chester Road North, Kidderminster, England
Umpires: VA Holder and R Palmer

- Points: Worcestershire 17, Yorkshire 4

Yorkshire v Warwickshire

22 August - 24 August
(Scorecard)

Warwickshire	v	Yorkshire
129 (58.3 overs); Alex Loudon 33 (87); Matthew Hoggard 4/33 (12.3 overs)		561-7 dec (126.1 overs); Jacques Rudolph 220 (328); Alfonso Thomas 4/109 (33 overs)
222 (55.3 overs); Tim Ambrose 89* (128); Darren Gough 5/52 (14.3 overs)

Yorkshire won by an innings and 210 runs
North Marine Road, Scarborough, England
Umpires: NGC Cowley and MJ Harris

- Points: Yorkshire 22, Warwickshire 2

Sussex v Yorkshire

5 September - 7 September
(Scorecard)

Sussex	v	Yorkshire
597-8 dec (157.1 overs); Andrew Hodd 123 (219); Adil Rashid 3/136 (35.1 overs)		247 (69.1 overs); Adil Rashid 54* (91); Mushtaq Ahmed 5/89 (30 overs)
		89 (44.1 overs); Inzamam-ul-Haq 22 (47); Naved-ul-Hasan 4/15 (6.1 overs)

Sussex won by an innings and 261 runs
County Ground, Hove, England
Umpires: VA Holder and AA Jones

- Points: Sussex 22, Yorkshire 3

Yorkshire v Hampshire

19 September - 22 September
(Scorecard)

Yorkshire	v	Hampshire
195 (61.1 overs); Inzamam-ul-Haq 51 (83); James Bruce 5/73 (25 overs)		244-4 (60.3 overs); Michael Carberry 113* (167); Matthew Hoggard 2/76 (15 overs)

Match Drawn
Headingley Cricket Ground, Leeds, England
Umpires: PJ Hartley and RJ Bailey

- Points: Yorkshire 5, Hampshire 8

== Friends Provident Scorecards ==
Nottinghamshire v Yorkshire

22 April 2007
(scorecard)

Yorkshire Phoenix; 280/4 (50 overs)	v	Nottinghamshire Outlaws; 243 all out (47.5 overs)
Younis Khan 100 (92); Mark Ealham 1/61 (9 overs)		Chris Read 68 (66); Deon Kruis 3/61 (9.4 overs)

Yorkshire won by 37 runs
Trent Bridge, Nottingham, England
Umpires: NL Bainton and IJ Gould

- Points: Nottinghamshire 0, Yorkshire 2

Scotland v Yorkshire

29 April 2007
(scorecard)

Yorkshire Phoenix; 259/8 (50 overs)	v	Scotland Saltires; 217 all out (49.3 overs)
Anthony McGrath 66 (71); John Blain 3/62 (10 overs)		Craig Wright 59 (66); Tim Bresnan 3/22 (8 overs)

Yorkshire won by 42 runs
The Grange, Edinburgh, Scotland
Umpires: RJ Bailey and JW Holder

- Points: Scotland 0, Yorkshire 2

Yorkshire v Leicestershire

7 May 2007
(scorecard)

Yorkshire Phoenix; 282/8 (50 overs)	v	Leicestershire Foxes; 284/4 (47.2 overs)
Jacques Rudolph 100 (133); Jim Allenby 3/44 (10 overs)		Jim Allenby 84 (66); Rich Pyrah 2/15 (5 overs)

Leicestershire won by 6 wickets
Headingley Cricket Ground, Leeds, England
Umpires: NGB Cook and R Palmer

- Points: Yorkshire 0, Leicestershire 2

Yorkshire v Worcestershire

13 May 2007
(scorecard)

Worcestershire Royals; 215/7 (50 overs)	v	Yorkshire Phoenix; 6/0 (1.4 overs)
Graham Hick 86* (87); Tim Bresnan 3/43 (9 overs)		Craig White 5* (10); Nadeem Malik 0/0 (0.4 overs)

No result
Headingley Cricket Ground, Leeds, England
Umpires: MJ Harris and JW Lloyds

- Points: Yorkshire 1, Worcestershire 1

Lancashire v Yorkshire

20 May 2007
(scorecard)

Yorkshire Phoenix; 250/8 (50 overs)	v	Lancashire Lightning; 251/3 (45.4 overs)
Anthony McGrath 135* (138); Sajid Mahmood 3/47 (10 overs)		Brad Hodge 141* (133); Darren Gough 1/26 (7 overs)

Lancashire won by 7 wickets
Old Trafford, Manchester, England
Umpires: JH Evans and VA Holder

- Points: Lancashire 2, Yorkshire 0

Warwickshire v Yorkshire

28 May 2007
(scorecard)

Yorkshire Phoenix	v	Warwickshire Bears

Match Abandoned, no result
Edgbaston, Birmingham, England
Umpires: RJ Bailey and NGC Cowley

- Points: Warwickshire 1, Yorkshire 1

Derbyshire v Yorkshire

31 May 2007
(scorecard)

Yorkshire Phoenix; 253/4 (50 overs)	v	Derbyshire Phantoms; 195 (40.2 overs)
Jacques Rudolph 81 (91); Tom Lungley 2/61 (10 overs)		Ant Botha 50 (66); Darren Gough 3/34 (8.2 overs)

Yorkshire won by 39 runs (D/L)
County Ground, Derby, England
Umpires: IJ Gould and NA Mallender

- Points: Derbyshire 0, Yorkshire 2

Yorkshire v Durham

3 June 2007
(scorecard)

Durham Dynamos; 266/8 (50 overs)	v	Yorkshire Phoenix; 213 (45.4 overs)
Scott Styris 98 (85); Darren Gough 3/46 (10 overs)		Anthony McGrath 100 (102); Ottis Gibson 3/48 (8 overs)

Durham won by 53 runs
Headingley Cricket Ground, Leeds, England
Umpires: B Hunt and JT Potter

- Points: Yorkshire 0, Durham 2

Yorkshire v Northamptonshire

13 June 2007
(scorecard)

Northamptonshire Steelbacks; 314/4 (50 overs)	v	Yorkshire Phoenix; 119/2 (21 overs)
Usman Afzaal 132 (144); Anthony McGrath 1/7 (1 overs)		Anthony McGrath 62* (60); David Lucas 1/29 (7 overs)

Yorkshire won by 1 run (D/L)
Headingley Cricket Ground, Leeds, England
Umpires: B Dudleston and TE Jesty

- Points: Yorkshire 2, Northamptonshire 0

== Twenty20 Cup Scorecards ==
Leicestershire v Yorkshire

22 June 2007
(scorecard)

Leicestershire Foxes; 154/5 (16 overs)	v	Yorkshire Phoenix; 141/9 (16 overs)
Jim Allenby 43 (33); Tim Bresnan 2/27 (3 overs)		Gerard Brophy 44 (32); Jeremy Snape 3/6 (1 over)

Leicestershire won by 13 runs
Grace Road, Leicester, England
Umpires: VA Holder and RK Illingworth

- Points: Leicestershire 2, Yorkshire 0

Yorkshire v Lancashire

25 June 2007
(scorecard)

Yorkshire Phoenix	v	Lancashire Lightning

Match abandoned, no result
Headingley Cricket Ground, Leeds, England
Umpires: GI Burgess and PJ Hartley

- Points: Yorkshire 1, Lancashire 1

Lancashire v Yorkshire

27 June 2007
(scorecard)

Lancashire Lightning; 143/9 (20 overs)	v	Yorkshire Phoenix; 113 (18.4 overs)
Brad Hodge 57 (49); Rich Pyrah 2/25 (4 overs)		Jacques Rudolph 48* (38); Tom Smith 3/15 (3.4 overs)

Lancashire won by 30 runs
Old Trafford, Manchester, England
Umpires: JF Steele and P Willey

- Points: Lancashire 2, Yorkshire 0

Nottinghamshire v Yorkshire

29 June 2007
(scorecard)

Nottinghamshire Outlaws; 149/9 (20 overs)	v	Yorkshire Phoenix; 145/5 (20 overs)
Bilal Shafayat 31 (23); Jacques Rudolph 3/20 (3 overs)		Anthony McGrath 55 (44); Graeme Swann 2/39 (4 overs)

Nottinghamshire won by 4 runs
Trent Bridge, Nottingham, England
Umpires: G Sharp and P Willey

- Points: Nottinghamshire 2, Yorkshire 0

Yorkshire v Durham

30 June 2007
(scorecard)

Durham Dynamos; 65/9 (9 overs)	v	Yorkshire Phoenix; 66/1 (6.5 overs)
Scott Styris 27 (16); David Wainwright 3/6 (2 overs)		Gerard Brophy 31* (21); Steve Harmison 1/20 (2 overs)

Yorkshire won by 9 wickets
Headingley Cricket Ground, Leeds, England
Umpires: B Hunt and JT Potter

- Points: Yorkshire 2, Durham 0

Durham v Yorkshire

3 July 2007
(scorecard)

Durham Dynamos; 133/5 (20 overs)	v	Yorkshire Phoenix; 134/4 (19.4 overs)
Gordon Muchall 41* (37); Darren Gough 1/17 (3 overs)		Andrew Gale 56 (52); Gareth Breese 1/15 (3.4 overs)

Yorkshire won by 6 wickets
Riverside Ground, Chester-le-Street, England
Umpires: B Hunt and JT Potter

- Points: Durham 0, Yorkshire 2

Yorkshire v Nottinghamshire

4 July 2007
(scorecard)

Nottinghamshire Outlaws; 61/3 (5 overs)	v	Yorkshire Phoenix; 65/2 (4.4 overs)
David Hussey 26* (12); Jason Gillespie 1/4 (1 over)		Craig White 31 (11); David Hussey 2/11 (1 over)

Yorkshire won by 8 wickets
Headingley Cricket Ground, Leeds, England
Umpires: JW Holder and JW Lloyds

- Points: Yorkshire 2, Nottinghamshire 0

Yorkshire v Derbyshire

6 July 2007
(scorecard)

Derbyshire Phantoms; 119/7 (20 overs)	v	Yorkshire Phoenix; 122/6 (18.3 overs)
Simon Katich 26 (22); Rich Pyrah 2/8 (2 overs)		Anthony McGrath 32* (38); Graham Wagg 2/16 (3 overs)

Yorkshire won by 4 wickets
Headingley Cricket Ground, Leeds, England
Umpires: MJD Bodenham and B Leadbeater

- Points: Yorkshire 2, Derbyshire 0

Sussex v Yorkshire

18 July 2007
(scorecard)

Sussex Sharks; 193/5 (20 overs)	v	Yorkshire Phoenix; 155 (19.5 overs)
Murray Goodwin 57 (49); Younis Khan 2/32 (3 overs)		Craig White 47 (25); Naved-ul-Hasan 3/26 (4 overs)

Sussex won by 38 runs
County Ground, Hove, England
Umpires: RK Illingworth and B Leadbeater

- Sussex progressed to the semi-finals.

== Natwest Pro40 Scorecards ==
Yorkshire v Somerset

29 July 2007
(scorecard)

Yorkshire Phoenix; 261/5 (40 overs)	v	Somerset Sabres; 242 (37 overs)
Jacques Rudolph 127 (114); Ian Blackwell 1/11 (1 over)		Ian Blackwell 97 (73); Jason Gillespie 3/45 (8 overs)

Yorkshire won by 9 runs (D/L)
North Marine Road, Scarborough, England
Umpires: NL Bainton and GI Burgess

- Points: Yorkshire 2, Somerset 0

Yorkshire v Middlesex

8 August 2007
(scorecard)

Middlesex Crusaders; 183/8 (40 overs)	v	Yorkshire Phoenix; 184/8 (39.5 overs)
Ben Scott 54* (71); Rich Pyrah 3/22 (8 overs)		Craig White 49 (59); Timothy Murtagh 3/34 (6.5 overs)

Yorkshire won by 2 wickets
Headingley Cricket Ground, Leeds, England
Umpires: RT Robinson and G Sharp

- Points: Yorkshire 2, Middlesex 0

Leicestershire v Yorkshire

19 August 2007
(scorecard)

Leicestershire Foxes; 60/2 (20 overs)	v	Yorkshire Phoenix
John Sadler 33* (60); Rich Pyrah 1/8 (4 overs)

No Result
Grace Road, Leicester, England
Umpires: MJD Bodenham and NJ Llong

- Points: Leicestershire 1, Yorkshire 1

Glamorgan v Yorkshire

20 August 2007
(scorecard)

Glamorgan Dragons; 129/8 (35 overs)	v	Yorkshire Phoenix; 131/2 (17.4 overs)
Mark Wallace 37* (63); Rich Pyrah 3/27 (7 overs)		Gerard Brophy 66 (36); James Harris 1/31 (5 overs)

Yorkshire won by 8 wickets
Sophia Gardens, Cardiff, Wales
Umpires: RK Illingworth and JF Steele

- Points: Glamorgan 0, Yorkshire 2

Yorkshire v Surrey

26 August 2007
(scorecard)

Yorkshire Phoenix; 145 (33.3 overs)	v	Surrey Brown Caps; 147-5 (29.1 overs)
Darren Gough 49* (53); Christopher Jordan 3/28 (8 overs)		James Benning 37 (25); David Wainwright 2/30 (8 overs)

Surrey won by 5 wickets
North Marine Road, Scarborough, England
Umpires: NGC Cowley and MJ Harris

- Points: Yorkshire 0, Surrey 2

Durham v Yorkshire

27 August 2007
(scorecard)

Yorkshire Phoenix; 122 (39.5 overs)	v	Durham Dynamos; 126/1 (15.4 overs)
Anthony McGrath 50 (109); Paul Wiseman 3/34 (5.5 overs)		Phil Mustard 66* (31); David Wainwright 0/8 (0.4 overs)

Durham won by 9 wickets
Riverside Ground, Chester-le-Street, England
Umpires: B Hunt and JT Potter

- Points: Durham 2, Yorkshire 0

Kent v Yorkshire

9 September 2007
(scorecard)

Kent Spitfires; 228/9 (40 overs)	v	Yorkshire Phoenix; 215/7 (40 overs)
Martin van Jaarsveld 50 (48); Rich Pyrah 3/50 (7 overs)		Jacques Rudolph 86 (107); Martin Saggers 3/21 (8 overs)

Kent won by 13 runs
St Lawrence Ground, Canterbury, England
Umpires: GI Burgess and JH Evans

- Points: Kent 2, Yorkshire 0

Yorkshire v Derbyshire

15 September 2007
(scorecard)

Yorkshire Phoenix; 236/5 (40 overs)	v	Derbyshire Phantoms; 129 (24 overs)
Michael Vaughan 95 (119); Boyd Rankin 2/56 (8 overs)		Simon Katich 38 (40); Deon Kruis 4/17 (7 overs)

Yorkshire won by 107 runs
Headingley Cricket Ground, Leeds, England
Umpires: B Dudleston and JW Holder

- Points: Yorkshire 2, Derbyshire 0

== Sources ==
- BBC Sport
- Yorkshire CC's website
