= 2009 Twenty20 Cup North Division =

2009 Twenty20 Cup North Division (Part of the 2009 Twenty20 Cup)
- Administrator: England and Wales Cricket Board
- Cricket format: Twenty20
- Tournament format: Group stage
- Participants: Derbyshire Phantoms; Durham Dynamos; Lancashire Lightning; Leicestershire Foxes; Nottinghamshire Outlaws; Yorkshire Carnegie
- Matches: 30
- Most runs: Jim Allenby (432 for Leicestershire)
- Most wickets: Mitchell Claydon (17 for Durham)

The North Division of the 2009 Twenty20 Cup determined which counties would qualify for the knockout stage of the 2009 Twenty20 Cup. Lancashire and Durham qualified as the top two sides in the Division.

== Table ==
Team	Pld	W	L	T	N/R	Pts	Net R/R
Lancashire Lightning	10	8	1	0	1	17	+1.112
Durham Dynamos	10	5	4	0	1	11	+0.157
Leicestershire Foxes	10	5	5	0	0	10	-0.041
Nottinghamshire Outlaws	10	4	6	0	0	8	-0.008
Yorkshire Carnegie	10	4	6	0	0	8	–0.475
Derbyshire Phantoms	10	3	7	0	0	6	–0.611

== Matches ==
25 May
Scorecard

Durham Dynamos; 163/6 (20 overs)	v	Nottinghamshire Outlaws; 167/9 (20 overs)
WI Jefferson 75 (48); N Killeen 3/21 [4]		ID Blackwell 59 (33); DJ Pattinson 3/34 [4]

Durham won by 1 wicket
Trent Bridge, Nottingham
Umpires: VA Holder and DJ Millns
Player of the match: ID Blackwell (Durham)

25 May
Scorecard

Leicestershire Foxes; 148/3 (20 overs)	v	Yorkshire Carnegie; 149/7 (19.5 overs)
HD Ackerman 66 (56); Rana Naved-ul-Hasan 2/22 [4]		MP Vaughan 35 (30); JKH Naik 2/22 [3]

Yorkshire won by 3 wickets
Headingley, Leeds
Umpires: MA Gough and NA Mallender
Player of the match: A Shahzad (Yorkshire)

26 May
(day/night)
Scorecard

Derbyshire Phantoms; 175/6 (20 overs)	v	Durham Dynamos; 116/10 (15.3 overs)
GT Park 50 (33); CEW Silverwood 2/23 [4]		KJ Coetzer 31 (27); T Lungley 3/16 [2.3]

Derbyshire won by 59 runs
Riverside Ground, Chester-le-Street
Umpires: JH Evans and RA Kettleborough
Player of the match: GT Park (Derbyshire)

26 May
(day/night)
Scorecard

Yorkshire Carnegie; 105/8 (20 overs)	v	Lancashire Lightning; 107/4 (15.3 overs)
MP Vaughan 36 (31); SD Parry 3/20 [4]		AG Prince 44 (36); GJ Kruis 2/18 [3.3]

Lancashire won by 6 wickets
Old Trafford Cricket Ground, Manchester
Umpires: SA Garratt and RT Robinson
Player of the match: AG Prince (Lancashire)

28 May
(day/night)
Scorecard

Lancashire Lightning; 151/6 (20 overs)	v	Nottinghamshire Outlaws; 140/7 (20 overs)
F du Plessis 31 (21); RJ Sidebottom 2/26 [4]		CMW Read 58* (47); TC Smith 3/20 [3]

Lancashire won by 11 runs
Old Trafford Cricket Ground, Manchester
Umpires: B Dudleston and DJ Millns
Player of the match: CMW Read (Nottinghamshire)

28 May
(day/night)
Scorecard

Leicestershire Foxes; 127/9 (20 overs)	v	Derbyshire Phantoms; 129/2 (19 overs)
JWA Taylor 40 (39); T Lungley 5/27 [4]		CJL Rogers 58 (36); HF Gurney 1/18 [4]

Derbyshire won by 8 Wickets
Grace Road, Leicester
Umpires: SA Garratt and RT Robinson
Player of the match: T Lungley (Derbyshire)

29 May
(day/night)
Scorecard

Derbyshire Phantoms; 158/5 (10 overs)	v	Nottinghamshire Outlaws; 159/2 (15.1 overs)
WW Hinds 66 (45); LJ Fletcher 2/27 [4]		GP Swann 90* (47); GG Wagg 2/41 [4]

Nottinghamshire won by 8 wickets
County Ground, Derby
Umpires: JW Holder and NA Mallender
Player of the match: GP Swann (Nottinghamshire)

29 May
(day/night)
Scorecard

Durham Dynamos; 144/8 (20 overs)	v	Leicestershire Foxes; 148/3 (20 overs)
KJ Coetzer 39* (35); ACF Wyatt 3/14 [4]		PA Nixon 53*(39); PD Collingwood 2/33 [4]

Leicestershire won by 7 wickets
Riverside Ground, Chester-le-Street
Umpires: JH Evans and PJ Hartley
Player of the match: PA Nixon (Leicestershire)

29 May
(day/night)
Scorecard

Yorkshire Carnegie; 111/8 (20 overs)	v	Lancashire Lightning; 112/5 (19.1 overs)
JA Rudolph 38 (33); G Chapple 2/14 [4]		SJ Croft 40*(49); DJ Wainwright 2/21 [4]

Lancashire won by 5 wickets
Headingley, Leeds
Umpires: MA Gough and RA Kettleborough
Player of the match: SI Mahmood (Lancashire)

31 May
Scorecard

Derbyshire Phantoms; 131/6 (20 overs)	v	Yorkshire Carnegie; 134/2 (16.1 overs)
WW Hinds 43 (43); GJ Kruis 2/16 [4]		AW Gale 79* (59); TD Groenewald 1/13 [2]

Yorkshire won by 8 wickets
Queen's Park, Chesterfield, Chesterfield
Umpires: RJ Bailey and SA Garratt
Player of the match: AW Gale (Yorkshire)

31 May
Scorecard

Durham Dynamos; 177/4 (20 overs)	v	Nottinghamshire Outlaws; 169/10 (19.4 overs)
MJ Di Venuto 55 (40); SR Patel 2/32 [4]		WI Jefferson 42 (24); ME Claydon 5/26 [3.4]

Durham won by 8 runs
Riverside Ground, Chester-le-Street
Umpires: PJ Hartley and NA Mallender
Player of the match: ME Claydon (Durham)

31 May
Scorecard

Leicestershire Foxes; 147/3 (20 overs)	v	Lancashire Lightning; 151/3 (16.3 overs)
J Allenby 71* (54); SJ Croft 1/11 [2]		F du Plessis 78* (49); HF Gurney 2/21 [4]

Lancashire won by 7 wickets
Grace Road, Leicester
Umpires: MA Gough and RA Kettleborough
Player of the match: F du Plessis (Lancashire)

2 June
Scorecard

Lancashire Lightning; 165/7 (20 overs)	v	Derbyshire Phantoms; 127/9 (20 overs)
Paul Horton 41 (20); Garry Park 3-23 (4)		Wavell Hinds 32 (31); Sajid Mahmood 4-29 (4)

Lancashire won by 38 runs
Old Trafford Cricket Ground, Manchester
Umpires: Barry Dudleston, Jeff Evans
Player of the match: Sajid Mahmood

2 June
Scorecard

Durham Dynamos; 116/8 (20 overs)	v	Yorkshire Carnegie; 117/8 (20 overs)
Dale Benkenstein 36 (35); Naved-ul-Hasan 2-15 (4)		Anthony McGrath 34 (43); Mitchell Claydon 2-18 (4)

Yorkshire won by 2 wickets
Headingley, Leeds
Umpires: John Holder, Richard Kettleborough
Player of the match: Tim Bresnan

3 June
Scorecard

Leicestershire Foxes; 205/2	v	Nottinghamshire Outlaws; 135/10
Jim Allenby 110 (58); Samit Patel 1-31 (4)		Bilal Shafayat 29 (32); Harry Gurney 3-21 (4)

Leics won by 70 runs
Grace Road, Leicester
Umpires: Michael Gough, Neil Bainton
Player of the match: Jim Allenby

3 June
Scorecard

Durham Dynamos; 123/6	v	Lancashire Lightning; 124/4
Gordon Muchall 50 (50); Faf du Plessis 1=16 (3)		Tom Smith 57 (56); Gareth Breese 1-20 (4)

Lancashire won by 6 wickets
Old Trafford, Manchester
Umpires: JW Holder and NGB Cook
Player of the match: Tom Smith

4 June
Scorecard

Nottinghamshire Outlaws; 155/6	v	Yorkshire Carnegie; 156/2
Adam Voges 82 (55); Naved-ul-Hasan 4-23 (4)		Andrew Gale 91 (55); Andre Adams 2-34 (4)

Yorkshire won by 8 wickets
Headingley, Leeds
Umpires: JH Evans and RA Kettleborough
Player of the match: Andrew Gale

4 June
Scorecard

Leicestershire Foxes; 144/6	v	Derbyshire Phantoms; 130/5
Matthew Boyce 33 (41); Garry Park 3-29 (4)		Greg Smith 43 (36); Claude Henderson 2-21 (4)

Leics won by 14 runs
County Ground, Derby
Umpires: Barry Dudleston and Peter Hartley
Player of the match: Jim Allenby

22 June
Scorecard

Leicestershire Foxes; 146/5	v	Lancashire Lightning; 138/10
Jim Allenby 69 (45); Stephen Parry 2-21 (4)		Steven Croft 30 (25); Iain O'Brien 5-23 (4)

Leics won by 8 runs
Aigburth Cricket Ground, Liverpool
Umpires: PJ Hartley and JW Holder
Player of the match: Iain O'Brien

22 June
Scorecard

Nottinghamshire Outlaws; 165/4	v	Yorkshire Carnegie; 154/8
Ali Brown 66 (32); Deon Kruis 2-38 (4)		Andrew Gale 76 (51); Mark Ealham 2-24 (3)

Notts won by 11 runs
Trent Bridge, Nottingham
Umpires: DJ Millns and NA Mallender
Player of the match: Ali Brown

23 June
Scorecard

Derbyshire Phantoms; 153/6	v	Durham Dynamos; 154/4
Stuart Law 59 (44); Mitchell Claydon 2-40 (4)		Phil Mustard 52 (31); Nantie Hayward 1-22 (4)

Durham won by 6 wickets
County Ground, Derby
Umpires: B Dudleston and P Willey
Player of the match: David Warner

24 June
Scorecard

Leicestershire Foxes; 123/7	v	Nottinghamshire Outlaws; 124/1
Matthew Boyce 32 (23); Ryan Sidebottom 3-16 (4)		Ali Brown 72 (48); Claude Henderson 1-32 (4)

Notts won by 9 wickets
Trent Bridge, Nottingham
Umpires: JH Evans and RT Robinson
Player of the match: Ali Brown

24 June
Scorecard

Durham Dynamos; 131/7	v	Yorkshire Carnegie; 90/9
Phil Mustard 26 (27); Tim Bresnan 3-26 (4)		Adil Rashid 28 (34); Ben Harmison 3-20 (4)

Durham won by 41 runs
Riverside Ground, Chester-le-Street
Umpires: NA Mallender and PJ Hartley
Player of the match: Ben Harmison

24 June
Scorecard

Lancashire Lightning; 220/5	v	Derbyshire Phantoms; 164/7
Andrew Flintoff 93 (41); Ian Hunter 2-37 (4)		Greg Smith 56 (42); Andrew Flintoff 2-32 (4)

Lancashire won by 56 runs
County Ground, Derby
Umpires: Richard Kettleborough and Vanburn Holder
Player of the match: Andrew Flintoff

26 June
Scorecard

Leicestershire Foxes; 164/6	v	Yorkshire Carnegie; 153/6
Jacques Du Toit 39 (16); Azeem Rafiq 2-21 (4)		Jacques Rudolph 61 (39); Wayne White 2-29 (4)

Leics won by 11 runs
Grace Road, Leicester
Umpires: Steven Patterson and Nick Cook
Player of the match: Claude Henderson

26 June
Scorecard

Derbyshire Phantoms; 165/6	v	Nottinghamshire Outlaws; 166/2
Graham Wagg 62 (43); Mark Ealham 3-20 (4)		Ali Brown 65 (42); Graham Wagg 1-18 (2)

Notts won by 8 wickets
Trent Bridge, Nottingham
Umpires: Michael Gough and Peter Hartley
Player of the match: Ali Brown

26 June

Durham Dynamos; Did not bat	v	Lancashire Lightning; Did not bat

Match abandoned

28 June
Scorecard

Leicestershire Foxes; 133/8	v	Durham Dynamos; 137/4
Boeta Dippenaar 63 (48); Mitchell Claydon 3-14 (4)		David Warner 44 (18); Claude Henderson 3-32 (4)

Durham won by 6 wickets
Grace Road, Leicester
Umpires: Peter Hartley and Tim Robinson
Player of the match: Mitchell Claydon

28 June
Scorecard

Nottinghamshire Outlaws; 173/7	v	Lancashire Lightning; 175/1
David Hussey 55 (31); Sajid Mahmood 2-26 (4)		Steven Croft 83 (47); Darren Pattinson 1-25 (4)

Lancashire won by 9 wickets
Trent Bridge, Nottingham
Umpires: Nick Cook and RJ Bailey
Player of the match: Steven Croft

28 June
Scorecard

Derbyshire Phantoms; 164/5	v	Yorkshire Carnegie; 127/10
Wavell Hinds 49 (41); Deon Kruis 1-28 (4)		Anthony McGrath 29 (24); Stuart Law 2-6 (0.5)

Lancashire won by 9 wickets
Headingley, Leeds
Umpires: JH Evans
Player of the match: Jake Needham and MA Gough
