= Joe Sayers =

Joe Sayers may refer to:

- Joe Sayers (cricketer) (born 1983), English cricketer
- Joseph D. Sayers (1841–1929), 22nd Governor of Texas
