= Ian Harvey =

Australian cricketer

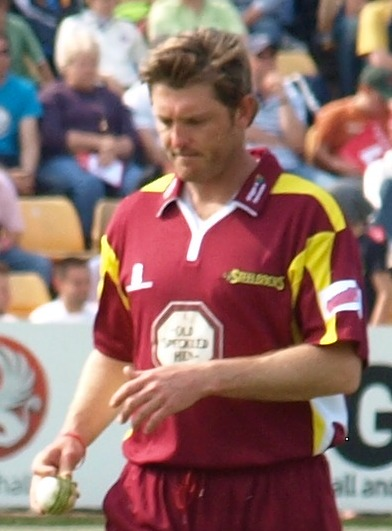

Personal information
- Full name: Ian Joseph Harvey
- Born: 10 April 1972 (age 54); Wonthaggi, Victoria, Australia
- Height: 172 cm (5 ft 8 in)
- Batting: Right-handed
- Bowling: Right arm medium
- Role: All-rounder
- Relatives: Mackenzie Harvey (nephew)

International information
- National side: Australia (1997–2004)
- ODI debut (cap 135): 4 December 1997 v South Africa
- Last ODI: 29 May 2004 v Zimbabwe
- ODI shirt no.: 29

Domestic team information
- Years: Team
- 1993/94–2004/05: Victoria
- 1999–2003; 2006: Gloucestershire
- 2004–2005: Yorkshire
- 2005/06: Cape Cobras
- 2007: Derbyshire
- 2008: Hampshire
- 2009: Northamptonshire
- 2010: Southern Rocks

Career statistics
Competition	ODI	FC	LA	T20
Matches	73	165	304	51
Runs scored	715	8,409	5,973	1,469
Batting average	17.87	34.60	24.88	31.93
100s/50s	0/0	15/46	2/28	3/5
Top score	48*	209*	112	109
Balls bowled	3,279	24,274	13,601	917
Wickets	85	425	445	52
Bowling average	30.31	27.51	22.35	22.51
5 wickets in innings	0	15	9	0
10 wickets in match	0	2	0	0
Best bowling	4/16	8/101	5/19	4/18
Catches/stumpings	17/–	114/–	83/–	18/–
Medal record
Men's Cricket
Representing Australia
ICC Cricket World Cup
Winner	2003 South Africa-Zimbabwe-Kenya
- Source: ESPNcricinfo, 1 September 2017

Ian Joseph Harvey (born 10 April 1972) is a former Australian cricketer. He was an all-rounder who played 73 One Day Internationals for Australia and was named as one of the five Wisden Cricketers of the Year for 2004 for his performances in county cricket. He was a part of the Australian squad which won the 2003 Cricket World Cup.

== International career ==
=== Australian squad ===
Harvey started his first-class cricket career with Victoria in the Sheffield Shield in 1993 as an all-rounder. He was called up to the Australian one day cricket team in 1997 and played 73 One Day Internationals. Harvey bowled tightly at the end of games, equipped with a well disguised slower ball, as well as being a big hitting late order batsman, however he did not hit an ODI half-century.

=== 2003 ICC Cricket World Cup ===
Harvey played in the 2003 World Cup in South Africa as a replacement for the injured Shane Watson. He played in Australia's group game against Pakistan, scoring 24 at better than a run-a-ball, supporting Andrew Symonds who made a match-winning 143 not out. Defending 310, Harvey was the best bowler picking up 4 wickets, including one with his first ball, as Australia won comfortably. Harvey lost his place when Darren Lehmann and Michael Bevan returned from injury. He featured in one more group game against the Netherlands where he picked up three more wickets.

He played in the first Super Six game against Sri Lanka making a brief 5 not out at the end of Australia's innings. He did not take a wicket when he bowled but he was economical. Against New Zealand he failed with the bat making just 2 but he bowled economically again, taking 1/11 in 6 overs. In the final Super Six stage against tournament surprise package Kenya he bowled tightly without reward. However, in the run chase of 175, after Australia stuttered, he and Symonds were involved together in a 50-run partnership as they saw Australia home carrying on their unbeaten run through the tournament. Harvey finished on 24 not out. Because of an injury to Damien Martyn, he played in the semi-final against Sri Lanka.

In the tournament he played 6 games, scored 66 runs at 22.00 and took 8 wickets at 19.62.

== Domestic career ==
=== Australia ===
Harvey played for Victoria between 1993–94 and 2004–05.

=== England ===
Harvey played for Gloucestershire from 1999 to 2003 in the English County Championship and domestic one-day competitions. He was an integral part of the team that won a number of one-day trophies, including four one-day finals in a row. On 23 June 2003, Harvey scored the first century in Twenty20 cricket, and went on to score three T20 centuries in all. In 2004 he switched counties to play for Yorkshire for whom he played until 2005.

For 2006, he returned to play for Gloucestershire in the County Championship and Victoria in the Pura Cup. He signed to play for Derbyshire in 2007, but did not play a full season as his clearance to play as an English-qualified player was not received from the Home Office. Approval was delayed as a result of a drink-driving conviction, a decision which upset Derbyshire chief executive John Sears. Derbyshire allowed Harvey to play for Middleton Cricket Club for a weekend as a temporary replacement for their professional.

=== South Africa ===
For the 2005–06 season, Harvey rejected a one-year contract from Victoria and opted to play for the South African side Cape Cobras, during the stint he was also involved in coaching of the team.

=== Twenty20 ===
Harvey excelled in the Twenty20 format, initially for Gloucestershire and Victoria. He also played in the first Indian Cricket League Twenty20 competition in 2007 for Chennai Superstars. He played in the Chennai team that won the inaugural league. He won both the man of the match award for the final and the player of the tournament award.

Being a specialist Twenty20 player, he signed short-term deals especially for the Twenty20 with Hampshire Hawks in 2008 and Northamptonshire Steelbacks in 2009. On his debut for Northants, he scored 12 with the bat but starred with the ball taking 4 for 18 off 4 overs to help them to a 17-run win against Warwickshire Bears. Harvey contracted swine flu, which kept him out of the quarter-finals which Northamptonshire won. He returned to play in the finals day of the competition.

In February 2010, Harvey signed to play T20 and first-class matches for Zimbabwean franchise Southern Rocks.

== Coaching career ==
Harvey was appointed assistant to head coach Richard Dawson at Gloucestershire County Cricket Club in the 2015 county season.

In 2026 Harvey joined the Nepal National Cricket Team as a bowling consultant ahead of T20 World Cup.

Ahead of the 2026 County Championship, Harvey joined Glamorgan County Cricket Club as assistant coach to Richard Dawson.

== Personal life ==
Harvey is uncle of Mackenzie Harvey.
