= Richard Blakey =

English cricketer (born 1967)

Personal information
- Full name: Richard John Blakey
- Born: 15 January 1967 (age 59); Huddersfield, Yorkshire, England
- Batting: Right-handed

Career statistics
Competition	Test	ODI
Matches	2	3
Runs scored	7	25
Batting average	1.75	12.50
100s/50s	0/0	0/0
Top score	6	25
Catches/stumpings	2/–	2/1
- Source: CricInfo, 1 January 2006

Richard John Blakey (born 15 January 1967) is a former English cricketer who played in two Test matches and three One Day Internationals from 1992 to 1993.

== Life and career ==
Blakey was a fine wicket-keeper for Yorkshire, who made two Test appearances for England in 1992-93 during the tour to India. He was picked for his batting potential, but he made little impression and returned to the county game. As was the case for many keepers during the 1990s, the presence of Jack Russell and Alec Stewart made difficult any further England appearances.

Blakey initially appeared in the Yorkshire team as a batsman in 1985, before replacing David Bairstow as the gloveman for the county. He scored a double century for England A in Zimbabwe on the 1989/90 tour, and a bright future as a specialist batsman seemed assured when he was named Cricket Writers' Club Young Cricketer of the Year in 1987.

After a prolific first full county season with the bat, his batting form suffered with the extra responsibility he was given behind the stumps, and he began batting down the order. Blakey remained a Yorkshire stalwart in all forms of the game for a decade and a half until 2000, taking 778 catches and completing 57 stumpings in 347 first-class games, and scoring 14,674 runs at 31.42, but eventually lost his place to Simon Guy and Gerard Brophy.

His highest score, 223 not out, made from just 206 balls with 35 fours, came in 2003 against Northamptonshire, and was a last reminder of what might have been had he been allowed to concentrate on his batting. He helped the second team for several seasons, being appointed Second XI captain and manager in 2004, before being released in 2006. He wrote an autobiography, cheekily entitled Taking It From Behind.
