= Matthew Wood (cricketer, born 1977) =

English cricketer (born 1977)

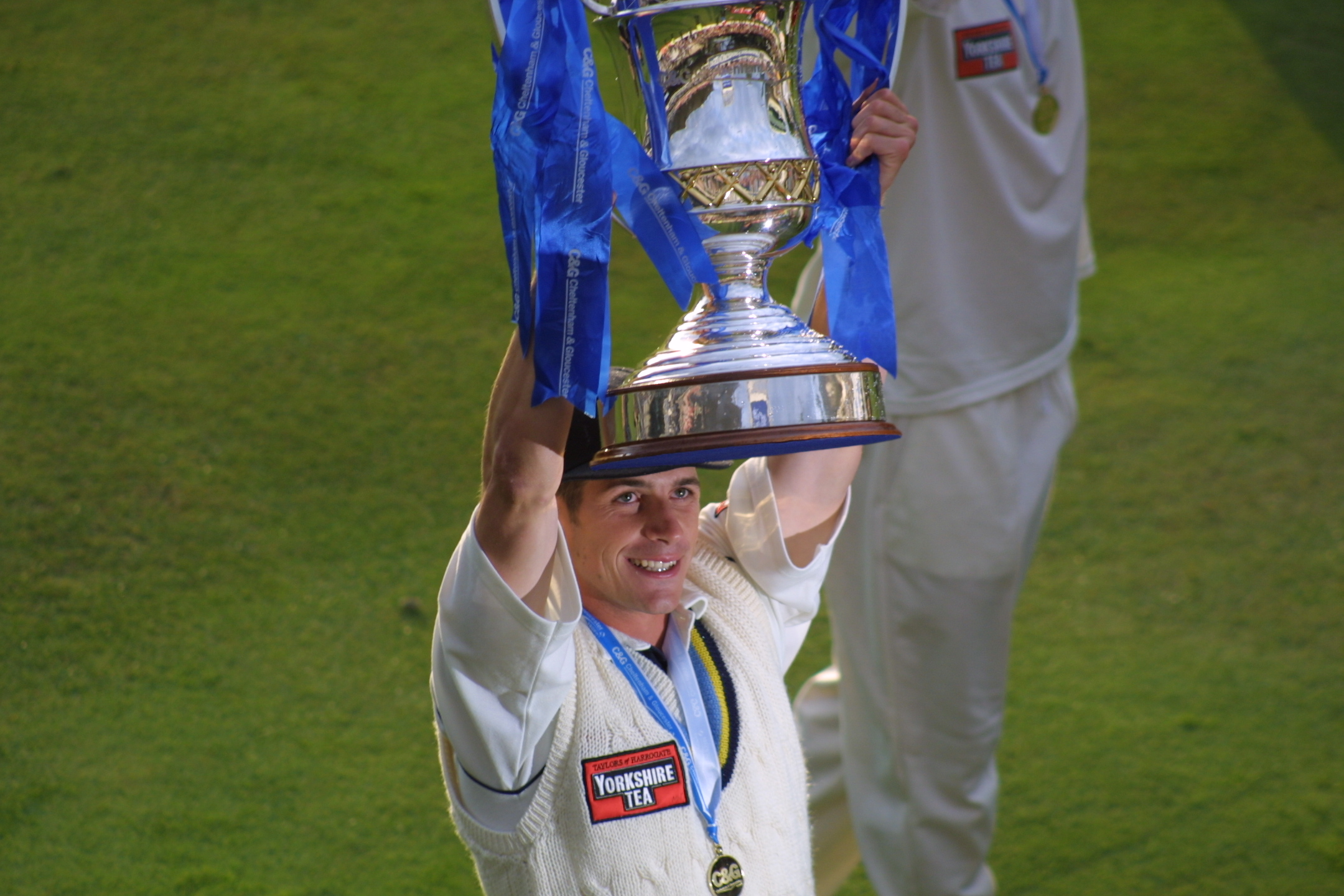
Matthew Wood lifting the C&G Cup for Yorkshire

Matthew James Wood (born 6 April 1977, Huddersfield, Yorkshire, England) is a former English first-class cricketer who played for Yorkshire County Cricket Club and Glamorgan in a career lasting eleven years. He was a right-handed batsman and occasional off spinner, who made his debut in first-class cricket in 1997. He played 136 first-class matches, scoring 7,052 runs with a highest score of 207, at an average of 32.80. He compiled sixteen first-class centuries, took 118 catches and snared two wickets at 21.50.

Wood scored heavily in Second XI cricket for three years before notching a century in his second first-class match, against Derbyshire in 1998, and completing the year with three more first-class tons Including 200 not out v Warwickshire at Leeds. After his 1000 run debut season, two frustrating seasons followed but, converted to an opening batsman, he starred in Yorkshire's County Championship winning side in 2001, scoring four more centuries at the top of the order And scored over 1000 runs again.

Wood was rewarded with two tours of Australia with the England Academy, but another slump in 2002, saw him lose his first team place. He recovered in 2003, helping himself to 1,400 runs, five centuries and the club and players player awards at Headingley, but was left out of England's plans.

Wood deputised as captain on several occasions with success in 2003 and 2004, but his hopes of promotion to Yorkshire's helm were not helped by steady seasons in 2004 and 2005, and he was dropped back to the Second XI in 2006 after another run of low scores. He began 2007 as captain of Yorkshire Second XI, but was released in mid-season. Wood joined Glamorgan in October 2007. In the 2008 season, he struggled to find his best form and finished the season captain of the 2nd XI, in February 2009, the popular Yorkshireman announced his retirement from the game.
