= Ismail Dawood =

English cricketer

Personal information
- Born: 23 July 1976 (age 50); Dewsbury, Yorkshire, England
- Batting: Right-handed
- Role: Wicket-keeper

Domestic team information
- Years: Team
- 1994: Northamptonshire
- 1996–1997: Worcestershire
- 1998–1999: Glamorgan
- 2000–2006: Herefordshire
- 2004–2005: Yorkshire
- 2007: Cheshire

Umpiring information
- WODIs umpired: 2 (2011–2013)

Career statistics
Competition	FC	LA	T20
Matches	39	51	11
Runs scored	1,122	732	44
Batting average	22.00	21.52	8.80
100s/50s	1/4	0/4	0/0
Top score	102	60	15
Catches/stumpings	94/6	44/14	5/2
- Source: Cricinfo, 23 January 2020

Ismail Dawood (born 23 July 1976) is a former professional cricketer, who played first-class cricket for four counties, and minor counties cricket for two more counties.

Dawood was born in Dewsbury, Yorkshire. A wicket-keeper and useful lower-order batsman, he first played first-class cricket for Northamptonshire in 1994, followed by stints with Worcestershire, Glamorgan, Yorkshire, Herefordshire, and finishing with a season with Cheshire in 2007.

Dawood played in eight youth Test matches for England Under-19s scoring 240 runs, with a best of 111, at 21.81, and taking 16 catches and four stumpings. He first represented Northamptonshire in the Second XI Championship in 1994, and between 1997 and 1999 appeared extensively in the competition, in the interim playing irregularly in first-class matches.

While with Glamorgan, Dawood showed that he was also a useful lower-order batsman and, in 1999, he recorded a maiden first-class hundred by making 102 against Gloucestershire at Cardiff, after being promoted to open the batting after injuries to other players. Later in the season, he also created a new county record by not conceding a bye as Lancashire totalled 556 for 6 declared at Blackpool.

In 39 first-class matches, Dawood scored 1,122 runs at 22 with a best of 102. He took 94 catches with six stumpings. In 51 one day matches he scored 732 runs at 21.52 with a top score of 60, taking 44 catches and making 14 stumpings. He played Twenty20 cricket in 2004 and 2005 for Yorkshire, scoring 44 runs at 8.80.

Dawood became an umpire. He umpired 16 first-class matches between 2009 and 2014, as well as other matches. In 2021 he took part in a legal challenge to the England and Wales Cricket Board, alleging that his umpiring career had been adversely affected by racial discrimination.
