= Richard Dawson (cricketer) =

English cricketer and coach

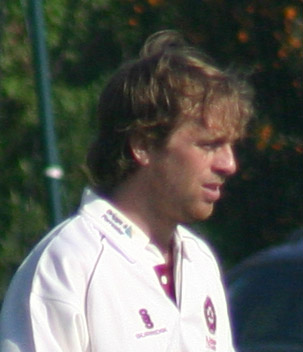

Personal information
- Full name: Richard Kevin James Dawson
- Born: 4 August 1980 (age 46); Doncaster, Yorkshire, England
- Height: 6 ft 4 in (1.93 m)
- Batting: Right-handed
- Bowling: Right-arm off break
- Role: Bowler

International information
- National side: England
- Test debut (cap 608): 3 December 2001 v India
- Last Test: 2 January 2003 v Australia

Domestic team information
- Years: Team
- 1999–2000: Devon
- 2001–2006: Yorkshire
- 2002: Marylebone Cricket Club
- 2007–2008: Northamptonshire
- 2009–2011: Gloucestershire

Career statistics
| Competition | Test | FC | LA | T20 |
|---|---|---|---|---|
| Matches | 7 | 103 | 122 | 41 |
| Runs scored | 114 | 2927 | 594 | 178 |
| Batting average | 11.40 | 21.52 | 10.06 | 10.47 |
| 100s/50s | —/— | —/12 | —/— | —/— |
| Top score | 19* | 87 | 41 | 27* |
| Balls bowled | 1116 | 15,467 | 4568 | 809 |
| Wickets | 11 | 199 | 123 | 39 |
| Bowling average | 61.54 | 44.07 | 30.32 | 26.79 |
| 5 wickets in innings | 0 | 5 | 0 | 0 |
| 10 wickets in match | 0 | 0 | 0 | 0 |
| Best bowling | 4/134 | 6/82 | 4/13 | 3/24 |
| Catches/stumpings | 3/— | 63/— | 43/— | 13/— |
- Source: ESPNcricinfo

Richard Kevin James Dawson (born 4 August 1980) is an English cricket coach and former player, who is currently the assistant coach of the England cricket team. As a player, he was primarily a bowler who bowled off-spin. He earned seven caps for England between 2001 and 2003, taking a total of 11 wickets.

== Playing career ==
Born on 4 August 1980, Doncaster, Yorkshire, Dawson attended Batley Grammar School and Exeter University. He played for the England Under-19 side against New Zealand in 1998/99 and Australia in 1999, and made his first-class debut for British Universities against the touring Zimbabweans the following summer. He first appeared for Yorkshire in 2001.

He made his Test match debut against India in 2001/02, and filled in for the injured Ashley Giles during the following winter's Ashes series. He bowled the ball in which Steve Waugh hit his famous last ball of the day century in the 2002/03.

In the 2006 season, Dawson captained the Yorkshire 2nd XI but at the end of that season he was released from his contract with Yorkshire. He was signed by Northamptonshire to provide cover for their England spinner Monty Panesar.

Dawson was released by Northamptonshire at the end of the 2007 season, and began training as a journalist in September 2007. However, in the 2008 English cricket season, he once again returned to English county cricket, this time with Gloucestershire. He was not a regular choice as a player but also held the role of spin coach.

== Coaching career ==
In February 2014 Dawson was appointed as the Second XI coach of Yorkshire County Cricket Club to replace the departing Paul Farbrace.

On 30 January 2015, Dawson was appointed the new head coach of Gloucestershire County Cricket Club following the departure of director of cricket John Bracewell.

In December 2019 Dawson was named as the coach for the England Lions' eight-match tour of Australia, due to take place in February and March 2020. He became a member of the senior England coaching team in 2022 and held the role until November 2024.

Dawson was appointed head coach at Glamorgan County Cricket Club in January 2025.
