= Rich Pyrah =

English cricketer (born 1982)

Personal information
- Full name: Richard Michael Pyrah
- Born: 1 November 1982 (age 44); Dewsbury, England
- Nickname: Pyro, RP
- Height: 6 ft 0 in (1.83 m)
- Batting: Right-handed
- Bowling: Right-arm medium
- Role: All-rounder

Domestic team information
- Years: Team
- 2001–2015: Yorkshire (squad no. 27)
- FC debut: 24 August 2004 Yorkshire v Glamorgan
- Last FC: 11 June 2013 Yorkshire v Middlesex
- LA debut: 15 May 2001 Yorkshire v Northamptonshire
- Last LA: 20 June 2013 Yorkshire v Middlesex

Career statistics
Competition	FC	LA	T20
Matches	51	118	105
Runs scored	1,621	1,084	593
Batting average	30.58	18.37	11.86
100s/50s	3/8	0/2	0/0
Top score	134*	69	42
Balls bowled	4,382	3,896	1,878
Wickets	55	140	108
Bowling average	45.94	26.21	21.43
5 wickets in innings	1	1	1
10 wickets in match	0	0	0
Best bowling	5/58	5/50	5/16
Catches/stumpings	22/–	37/–	40/–
- Source: Cricinfo, 1 October 2015

Richard Michael Pyrah (born 1 November 1982) is an English first-class cricketer, who played all his career for Yorkshire County Cricket Club.

Educated at Ossett School, the 6-foot-tall (1.8 m) right-hand batsman and right-arm medium pacer was used mainly in one day and Twenty20 cricket. He made his one-day debut in 2001, but had to wait until 2004 for his first-class bow.

Pyrah made his 100th appearance for Yorkshire in one day cricket in June 2013, against Middlesex at Headingley.

In September 2015, at the end of his benefit season, Pyrah retired from professional cricket in order to take up a full-time post on the club's coaching staff.
