= Simon Guy =

English cricketer

Personal information
- Full name: Simon Mark Guy
- Born: 17 November 1978 (age 47); Rotherham, South Yorkshire, England
- Height: 5 ft 7 in (1.70 m)
- Batting: Right-handed
- Role: Wicket-keeper

Domestic team information
- Years: Team
- 2000–2011: Yorkshire (squad no. 23)
- 2012–2015: Suffolk
- FC debut: 24 May 2000 Yorkshire v Zimbabweans
- Last FC: 18 May 2011 Yorkshire v Lancashire
- List A debut: 7 July 2002 Yorkshire v West Indies A
- Last List A: 22 May 2011 Yorkshire v Worcestershire

Career statistics
Competition	FC	LA	T20
Matches	37	32	10
Runs scored	742	282	44
Batting average	16.13	14.84	8.80
100s/50s	0/1	0/0	0/0
Top score	52*	40	13
Catches/stumpings	98/12	34/11	2/0
- Source: ESPNCricinfo, 27 January 2025

Simon Mark Guy (born 17 November 1978)) is an English former first-class cricketer, who played for Yorkshire County Cricket Club.

He played thirty seven first-class matches as a wicket-keeper, taking 98 catches and twelve stumpings, and as a right-handed batsman averaged 16.13. He fell ill in February 2009 with a cerebral abscess, and required an emergency operation which led to him being hospitalised for six weeks which meant he missed Yorkshire's pre-season tour to Dubai and Sharjah. However he returned to first team action three months later in May, playing in a Friends Provident Trophy game for Yorkshire. He played for Darlington C.C. in 2009 and Marske C.C. in 2010 as club professional in the North Yorkshire and South Durham Cricket League.

He has attracted media attention for pioneering a new form of protective face-gear, dubbed the "Hannibal mask", the after character Hannibal Lecter from the film The Silence of the Lambs.

Guy comes from a cricketing family, with his two brothers playing competitive league cricket in Yorkshire. His father has represented Nottinghamshire and Worcestershire Second XI's and turned down the opportunity to sign professional terms for Worcestershire in the late 1960s.

Having parted company with Yorkshire in 2009, he returned briefly to their ranks in 2011, to cover for a player shortage, playing in a County Championship against Lancashire in May that year.
