= Peter Hartley (cricketer) =

English cricketer and umpire

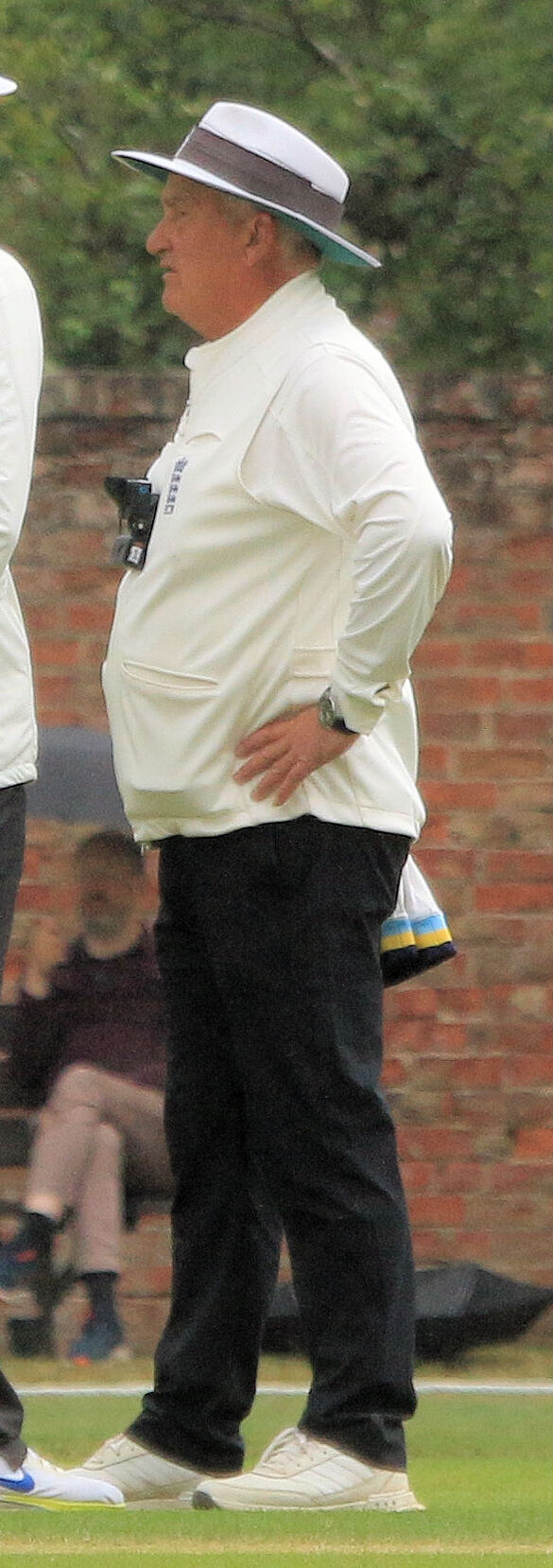
- Hartley in 2025

Personal information
- Full name: Peter John Hartley
- Born: 18 April 1960 (age 66); Keighley, West Riding of Yorkshire, England
- Batting: Right-handed
- Bowling: Right-arm medium-fast
- Role: Bowler, umpire

Domestic team information
- Years: Team
- 1982: Warwickshire
- 1985–1997: Yorkshire
- 1998–2000: Hampshire
- FC debut: 7 July 1982 Warwickshire v Lancashire
- Last FC: 13 September 2000 Hampshire v Yorkshire
- LA debut: 11 July 1982 Warwickshire v Gloucestershire
- Last LA: 10 September 2000 Hampshire v Derbyshire

Umpiring information
- ODIs umpired: 6 (2007–2009)
- T20Is umpired: 3 (2006–2009)
- WTests umpired: 1 (2003)
- WODIs umpired: 5 (2005–2013)
- WT20Is umpired: 7 (2011–2015)
- FC umpired: 239 (2002–present)
- LA umpired: 193 (2002–present)
- T20 umpired: 184 (2003–present)

Career statistics
Competition	First-class	List A
Matches	232	270
Runs scored	4,321	1,765
Batting average	19.91	16.34
100s/50s	2/14	0/4
Top score	127*	83
Balls bowled	37,107	12636
Wickets	683	356
Bowling average	30.21	25.47
5 wickets in innings	23	5
10 wickets in match	3	0
Best bowling	9/41	5/20
Catches/stumpings	68/–	46/–
- Source: Cricinfo, 16 June 2013

Peter John Hartley (born 18 April 1960) is an English first-class cricketer and umpire.

== Playing career ==
Born 18 April 1960, in Keighley West Riding of Yorkshire, Hartley made his debut for Warwickshire in 1982. A right-arm medium fast bowler, he moved to Yorkshire in 1985, and stayed there until 1997, when he relocated to Hampshire. When he retired at the end of the 2000 season, Hartley was Hampshire's opening bowler.

He made his highest first-class score for Yorkshire in a Roses match in 1988, making 127 not out out of a total of 224, while batting at no. 8 and coming to the wicket with his team at 37 for 6. Another highlight of his playing career was playing in the final when Yorkshire won the 1987 Benson & Hedges Cup, a rare triumph for the county in these years.

Hartley represented the England team in a Masters tournament in Sharjah in 1996.

== Umpiring career ==
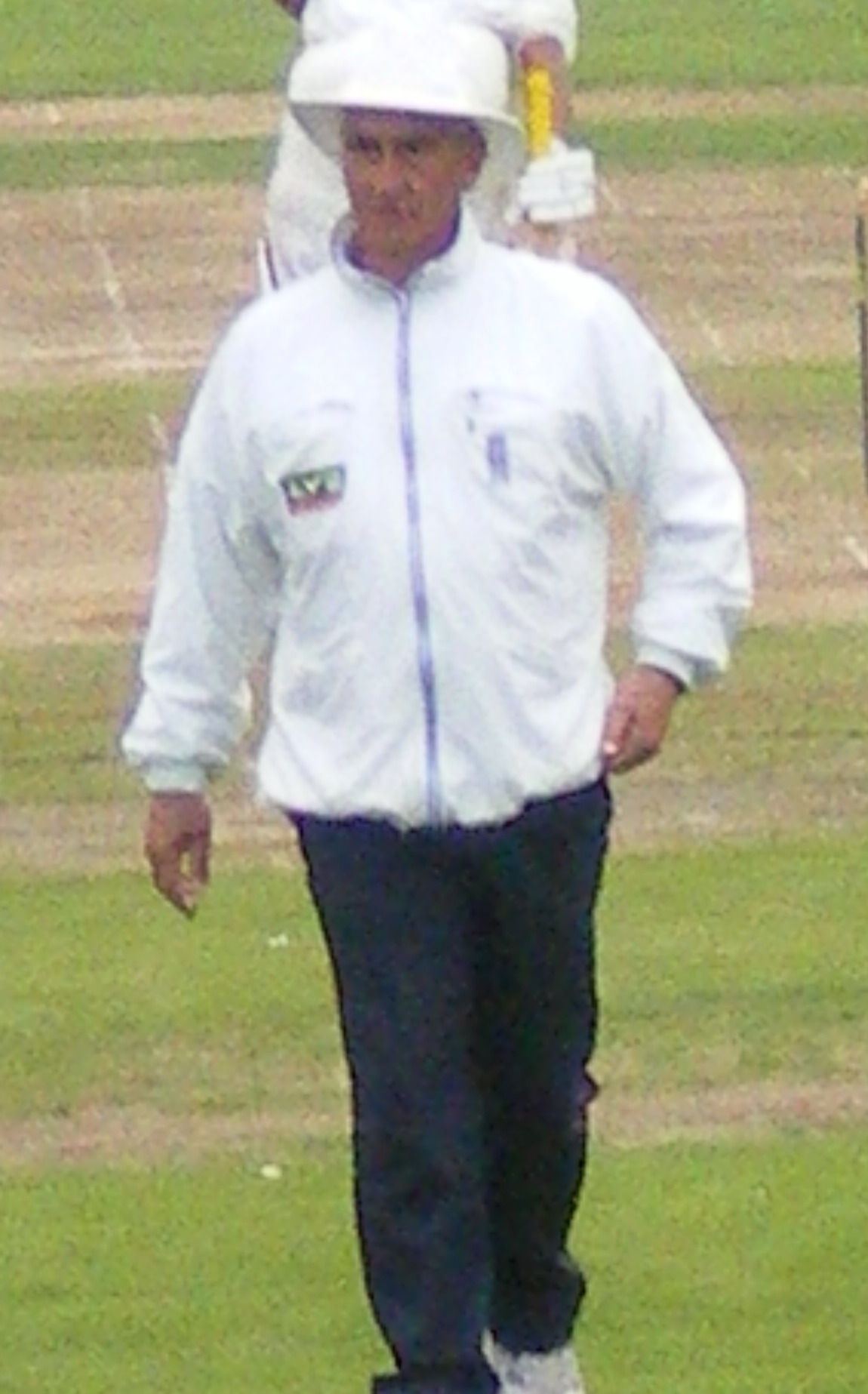
Peter Hartley umpiring at North Marine Road, Scarborough

After retiring as a player, Hartley became an umpire, making his first-class umpiring debut in 2003. Between 2006 and 2009 he officiated in international cricket, taking charge of six one day international matches and three Twenty20 international matches. He continues to stand in List A and first-class cricket matches.

As of 2021, he remains a member of the England and Wales Cricket Board's umpire list.

== See also ==
- List of One Day International cricket umpires
- List of Twenty20 International cricket umpires
