= Deon Kruis =

South African cricketer (born 1974)

Personal information
- Full name: Gideon Jacobus Kruis
- Born: 9 May 1974 (age 52); Pretoria, South Africa
- Height: 6 ft 3 in (1.91 m)
- Batting: Right-handed
- Bowling: Right-arm fast-medium
- Role: Bowler

Domestic team information
- Years: Team
- 1993/94–1996/97: Northern Transvaal
- 1997/98–2003/04: Griqualand West
- 2003/04–2004/05: Eagles
- 2005–2009: Yorkshire (squad no. 5)
- FC debut: 24 November 1993 Transvaal B v Free State B
- Last FC: 23 September 2009 Yorkshire v Hampshire
- LA debut: 31 October 1997 Griqualand West v Natal
- Last LA: 30 August 2009 Yorkshire v Sussex

Career statistics
Competition	FC	LA	T20
Matches	130	131	24
Runs scored	1,849	430	41
Batting average	15.15	11.31	20.50
100s/50s	0/3	0/0	0/0
Top score	59	31*	22
Balls bowled	25,664	6,062	526
Wickets	406	161	23
Bowling average	31.53	28.90	24.26
5 wickets in innings	19	0	0
10 wickets in match	1	0	0
Best bowling	7/58	4/17	2/15
Catches/stumpings	45/–	29/–	7/–
- Source: CricketArchive, 13 October 2009

Gideon Jacobus Kruis (born 9 May 1974), popularly known as Deon Kruis, is a South African first-class cricketer who played in England with Yorkshire County Cricket Club for five seasons from 2004 to 2009. His South African cricket has been for Northern Transvaal, Griqualand West and Eagles.

He is a right-handed batsman, and bowls right-arm fast-medium. At the end of the 2006 season he was one of Yorkshire's more successful bowlers helping them stay in Division 1 of the County Championship.

Kruis retired at the end of the 2009 season.
