= Joe Sayers (cricketer) =

English cricketer (born 1983)

Personal information
- Full name: Joseph John Sayers
- Born: 5 November 1983 (age 43); Leeds, Yorkshire, England
- Height: 6 ft 0 in (1.83 m)
- Batting: Left-handed
- Bowling: Right-arm off-break
- Role: Batsman

Domestic team information
- Years: Team
- 2002–2004: Oxford UCCE
- 2003–2014: Yorkshire (squad no. 22)
- FC debut: 13 April 2002 Oxford UCCE v Worcestershire
- Last FC: 28 May 2013 Yorkshire v Somerset
- LA debut: 21 September 2003 Yorkshire v Gloucestershire
- Last LA: 6 May 2012 Yorkshire v Kent

Career statistics
Competition	FC	LA	T20
Matches	106	28	12
Runs scored	5,427	516	172
Batting average	33.50	19.84	19.11
100s/50s	11/28	0/4	0/0
Top score	187	62	44
Balls bowled	361	60	–
Wickets	6	1	–
Bowling average	29.66	79.00	–
5 wickets in innings	0	0	–
10 wickets in match	0	0	–
Best bowling	3/15	1/31	0/–
Catches/stumpings	61/–	2/–	2/–
- Source: CricInfo, 4 June 2013

Joseph John Sayers (born 5 November 1983) is a former English first-class cricketer, who has played for the Oxford University Centre of Cricketing Excellence, Oxford University and Yorkshire. He is a left-handed opening batsman and right arm off spin bowler. Sayers was educated at St Mary's School, Menston, and Worcester College, Oxford.

== Early career ==
Sayers hit his sixth first-class century, coming off 318 balls and taking over six and a half hours, against Durham at Headingley in the opening home fixture of the 2007 season, as he carried his bat through the first innings, hitting a then personal best score of 149 not out. In June 2007, he surpassed this score against Kent at the Nevill Ground, Royal Tunbridge Wells, scoring 187. Sayers played club cricket for Hoylandswaine Cricket Club in the Huddersfield Premier League. His first-class career with Yorkshire commenced in 2004.

== England Lions ==
On 15 August 2009, Sayers replaced Jonathan Trott in the England Lions squad for the tour match against Australia before the fifth Ashes Test match.

== Illness ==
In 2010, Sayers was diagnosed with post-viral fatigue syndrome. It meant that his season was over before it had really started, and whilst his playing colleagues made a serious attempt at the County Championship title, Sayers was hardly able to walk at home. His recovery led to him being picked for action in the less successful 2011 campaign.

== Recent times ==
In 2012, Sayers signed a new two-year contract with Yorkshire, although he had slipped from regular first team duties. He has since then turned his hand to writing with Rose-tinted Summer.
