= Anthony McGrath (cricketer) =

English cricketer and coach (born 1975)

Personal information
- Full name: Anthony McGrath
- Born: 6 October 1975 (age 51); Bradford, West Yorkshire, England
- Nickname: Maggs
- Height: 6 ft 2 in (1.88 m)
- Batting: Right-handed
- Bowling: Right-arm medium
- Role: All-rounder

International information
- National side: England
- Test debut (cap 614): 22 May 2003 v Zimbabwe
- Last Test: 31 July 2003 v South Africa
- ODI debut (cap 175): 17 June 2003 v Pakistan
- Last ODI: 5 September 2004 v India
- ODI shirt no.: 30

Domestic team information
- Years: Team
- 1995–2012: Yorkshire (squad no. 10)

Career statistics
Competition	Test	ODI	FC	LA
Matches	4	14	257	296
Runs scored	201	166	14,698	7,574
Batting average	40.20	16.60	36.83	32.78
100s/50s	0/2	0/1	35/70	7/45
Top score	81	52	211	148
Balls bowled	102	228	9,739	3,233
Wickets	4	4	134	83
Bowling average	14.00	43.75	35.66	32.71
5 wickets in innings	0	0	1	0
10 wickets in match	0	0	0	0
Best bowling	3/16	1/13	5/39	4/41
Catches/stumpings	3/–	4/–	181/–	97/–
- Source: cricketarchive.com, 30 March 2013

Anthony McGrath (born 6 October 1975) is an English cricket coach and former first-class cricketer, who played county cricket for Yorkshire County Cricket Club from 1995 to 2012. He was a right-handed batsman and bowled part-time right-arm medium pace and twice captained Yorkshire, in the 2003 and 2009 seasons. He is the younger brother of the rugby league and union coach, Damian McGrath.

In October 2024 McGrath was appointed the head coach of Yorkshire after nine years holding various coaching roles at Essex County Cricket Club.

== International career ==
McGrath made his Test match debut for England against Zimbabwe at Lord's on 22 May 2003. He made 69 in his debut innings and took 3/16. In the second Test against Zimbabwe, McGrath scored his second half-century by making 81. His third Test was against South Africa and he made 34. In his fourth and final Test match he made a disappointing 4 and 13, and took 1/40 before being dropped from the team.

== Domestic career ==
McGrath made his debut in 1995 and was capped in 1999. He spent a year as captain in 2003 before stepping down to concentrate on his international career. He had a successful 2006 season hitting 1,293 first-class runs at an average of over 60. But he became disillusioned by the direction the club was taking after it only narrowly avoided relegation from County Championship Division One. It was only after Darren Gough's appointment as Yorkshire captain, and the major signings of Jacques Rudolph and Younis Khan that McGrath became convinced Yorkshire shared his ambitions and he decided to stay. He then declared himself delighted with the new situation at Yorkshire and hoped to stay for as long as possible.

After a slow start to the season, perhaps due to the off season situation, McGrath hit 135 not out in the opening Roses match of 2007, a one-dayer played at Old Trafford, and consecutive centuries against Durham (Friends Provident Trophy) and Kent (County Championship). His excellent form continued as he reached a personal milestone in the rain-affected Championship match with Warwickshire at Edgbaston, scoring 188 not out on 16 July 2007.

He was appointed as captain for the 2009 season, but stepped down from leading the side in late 2009, as he felt the pressures of the job were affecting his form. Oddly, that season he increased his career best tally to 211, again scored against Warwickshire at Edgbaston. McGrath had a more successful season in 2010 scoring 1,219 first-class runs and, in doing so, passed the thousand runs mark for the third time. He also scored important runs in both the 40 and 20-over competitions. However, knee injuries and sciatica occurred in the next two seasons, which restricted his effectiveness.

McGrath retired from professional cricket following the conclusion of the 2012 season. After retirement he worked as a coaching consultant for Yorkshire, and in February 2016 was appointed assistant head coach at Essex, assisting his former Yorkshire colleague Chris Silverwood

== Coaching career ==
In November 2017, McGrath was appointed as the head coach of Essex. In January 2022, he was appointed as the batting coach for the England's T20I series against West Indies. Essex named McGrath as director of cricket in July 2024. In October 2024, he signed a five-year contract to become Yorkshire head coach.
