= Somerset County Cricket Club in 2005 =

Somerset Sabres
2005 season
- Captain: (South Africa) Graeme Smith
- Ground(s): County Ground, Taunton; Recreation Ground, Bath

Somerset County Cricket Club played in Division Two of both the County Championship and the Sunday League in 2005. Somerset started at 10–1 to finish Division Two County Champions. Batting seems strong with Smith, Jayasuriya, Blackwell and Trescothick. But the same cannot be said of the bowling, which will find it difficult to dismiss teams twice on the flat Taunton pitch.

The first match of the season was against Durham UCCE, which showed how good a batting pitch Taunton is, with both teams scoring well. The first County Championship game was a draw against Lancashire at Old Trafford. The next game was a totesport League game against Warwickshire, which was abandoned as a draw because of rain.

Somerset's second Championship game was a comprehensive innings defeat at the hands of Yorkshire, which was followed by another heavy defeat to Yorkshire on the Sunday, and a 9 wicket defeat by Essex in the Championship. They then lost by 8 wickets to the Foxes at Taunton, but on the May Day Bank Holiday thrashed Surrey.

On 4 May they were edged out of the C&G Trophy at Round One by Leicestershire in a low-scoring game. They were then beaten by Durham in Stockton-on-Tees in the Championship, their fourth successive loss in the Championship, but continued their good form in the National League with a 16-run win in Edinburgh over the Scots. They picked up their form in the Championship, however, drawing with Lancashire in a rain-ravaged match before travelling to Northampton to beat the hosts Northamptonshire.

June started with a draw against Leicestershire, before two losses in the one-day league - to Leicestershire and Kent. Despite the poor one-day form, they could still pull off a four-wicket win against the Australians, however, widely recognised as the best in the world. Form eluded them in the league, though, as they whimpered to a 15-run defeat at the hands of Scotland at Taunton.

The Twenty20 Cup started with a confusing loss to Glamorgan Dragons where the scores were tied after 20 overs a side but Glamorgan won on fewer wickets down. However, Somerset got their revenge over Glamorgan five days later, in the middle of a three-game win streak. Then followed a rained-off game and two losses that threatened to send them out of the quarter-finals, but they recovered to beat Gloucestershire by 95 runs in a match where Somerset set a Twenty20 Cup record with their team score of 228 for 5. A stunning triple century from only 255 deliveries from Graeme Smith won them the match against Leicestershire, and they followed up with a win in Northampton to go through to the Semi-Finals of the Twenty20 Cup at the Oval. After not playing in the Championship the following week, they beat Kent by eight wickets in a shortened National League match.

Their poor Championship form continued in the last week of July, however, as they went down to Durham by 207 runs. However, despite their poor performances in the two league competitions, they went on to defeat Leicestershire Foxes and Lancashire Lightning on the Twenty20 Cup finals day at The Oval, thus winning the Twenty20 Cup.

Two days later, it was back to normal proceedings for Somerset, however. They suffered two narrow National League losses in the space of two days, to Sussex Sharks and Derbyshire Phantoms, before eking out a five-run win over Derbyshire in the Championship. A high-scoring draw with Yorkshire followed, and Yorkshire stayed for yet another high-scoring match - a National League game which Somerset won by two runs. Away from Taunton, however, Somerset couldn't keep up their good batting, and their bowling conceded 696 runs in one innings as Worcestershire beat them by an innings and 56 runs. A victory over Durham in the National League redeemed that loss somewhat, though, and they continued on the winning path with victories over Essex in the Championship and Surrey in the National League.

After a week-long break, September began with yet another National League victory, over Warwickshire, before their streak of four victories in a row was broken by Northamptonshire in a drawn game. As reigning Twenty20 Cup champions, they were invited to the International 20:20 Club Championship, where they lost two matches and bowed out at the group stage. Two days later, they travelled up to Chester-le-Street, where a batting collapse led to a five-wicket defeat at the hands of Durham, and they also lost to Derbyshire in the Championship, the first team to do so in three years.

== Players ==
- (Sri Lanka) Sanath Jayasuriya
- (England) Gareth Andrew
- (England) Ian Blackwell
- (England) Mike Burns
- (England) Andy Caddick
- (England) Wesley Durston
- (England) Neil Edwards
- (England) John Francis
- (England) Simon Francis
- (England) Carl Gazzard
- (England) James Hildreth
- (England) Richard Johnson
- (England) Aaron Laraman
- (Cricket West Indies) Nixon McLean
- (England) Michael Munday
- (England) Keith Parsons
- (England) Michael Parsons
- Arul Suppiah
- (England) Marcus Trescothick
- (England) Robert Turner
- (England) Matthew Wood
- (England) Mike Burns

== Tables ==
=== Championship ===
2005 County Championship – Division Two
Pos	Team	Pld	W	D	L	Pen	Bat	Bowl	Pts
1	Lancashire	16	7	6	3	0	43	47	212
2	Durham	16	6	8	2	0	45	44	205
3	Yorkshire	16	5	10	1	0.5	49	42	200.5
4	Northamptonshire	16	5	8	3	0	45	46	193
5	Essex	16	5	7	4	0	51	36	185
6	Worcestershire	16	5	4	7	5.5	53	46	179.5
7	Leicestershire	16	3	7	6	0.5	45	45	159.5
8	Somerset	16	4	5	7	0	42	37	155
9	Derbyshire	16	1	7	8	0	31	43	116

=== totesport League ===
2005 totesport League – Division Two
Pos	Team	Pld	W	L	NR	T	Pts
1	Sussex Sharks	18	13	4	1	0	54
2	Durham Dynamos	18	12	4	2	0	52
3	Warwickshire Bears	18	10	6	2	0	44
4	Leicestershire Foxes	18	10	7	1	0	42
5	Derbyshire Phantoms	18	9	7	1	1	40
6	Somerset Sabres	18	9	8	1	0	38
7	Surrey Lions	18	7	10	1	0	30
8	Kent Spitfires	18	6	10	2	0	28
9	Yorkshire Phoenix	18	5	13	0	0	20
10	Scottish Saltires	18	2	14	1	1	12

== Match details ==
=== Somerset v Durham UCCE (9–11 April) ===
Match drawn

At Taunton, the first day of the season for these two teams made up Somerset's first innings. In 105 overs Somerset made a mammoth 580 for 5 declared. Ian Blackwell contributed 191, John Francis 123 and Matthew Wood 95 as Durham UCCE struggled. Francis and Wood's partnership is a new record fifth-wicket partnership for Somerset, beating the 235 put on by Box Case and Jack White in 1927. Somerset declared on their overnight total. However, on a good pitch, Durham UCCE fared well, making a mammoth 304 for the first wicket, and were 327 for 1 at close on the second day. Will Smith scored 156 and Alistair Maiden 211 not out before Durham UCCE were able to declare on 433 for 4, 147 behind. Also, this was against a first-class attack including Andy Caddick and Nixon McLean. Somerset chose to bat out the rest of the day for a draw, finishing on 211 for 2 declared, with John Francis scoring 112. (Cricinfo scorecard)

=== Lancashire v Somerset (13–16 April) ===
Lancashire (10pts) drew with Somerset (9pts)

At Old Trafford, Somerset won the toss and elected to field on a seaming pitch after a delayed start. Mal Loye was the only Lancastrian to score a half-century, as Somerset made the most of the conditions. Iain Sutcliffe, Stuart Law and Mark Chilton all worked themselves into the 30s, but failed to progress. Lancashire finished the first day on 235 for 7.

Second day honours went to Lancashire. First their not out batsmen, Dominic Cork and Sajid Mahmood, took the eighth wicket partnership to 94, and Lancashire finished on 323. Andy Caddick took 4 for 78. James Anderson and Dominic Cork then set about damaging Somerset's batting. Only Ian Blackwell, who was dropped by Law at slip when on 17, put up much resistance, with captain and England opener Marcus Trescothick making only 11. At one stage Somerset were 53 for 4, and they finished the day on 193 for 7, with Blackwell not out on 74.

Just as Lancashire's tail had pushed on at the end of their innings, so did Somerset's on the third day. Blackwell made his second century in two innings, finally surrendering on 122. The second-highest scorer was Richard Johnson with 40. Blackwell explained, "I've changed a few things this year and started to bat on off stump. A lot of bowlers have been going across me because they know that I go at widish balls. The ball's now closer to me if it's slanted across and I'm backing my hand-eye co-ordination to avoid being lbw." The day itself was very cold, with Blackwell saying, "It was absolutely perishing out there. I think play should be abandoned if it gets that cold." After Somerset were dismissed for 272, six Somerset men came out to field sporting woollen hats. Bad light and rain meant the day ended at 2.07pm, with Lancashire on 33 for 1, 84 runs ahead. Whilst a Lancashire victory was not out of the question, the most likely result was the draw.

Lancashire batted on for another 49 overs, scoring 195 for 6 declared, and setting Somerset a target of 247 runs in 31 overs. Paul Horton and Loye put on 94 for the first wicket. But all in all, taking 61 overs to score 195 was hardly declaration batting. Somerset did not go for the win (which would have meant scoring at well over 7 an over), and made 69 for 3 off 22.3 overs before play ended because of bad light. Lancashire's Mal Loye, who fell just short of his century on 92 in the second innings to go with his 53 in the first said, "To get a couple of fifties against a pretty good attack is a good start. It was a pretty difficult pitch to bat on during the first day but it got easier as the match wore on and I was disappointed to miss out. Getting a century is a psychological thing for a batsman. I don't set myself goals or anything like that, but it's always nice to get a hundred." (Cricinfo scorecard)

=== Warwickshire v Somerset (17 April) ===
Match abandoned - Warwickshire (2pts), Somerset (2pts)

Warwickshire won the toss at Edgbaston and put Somerset in to bat. Mike Burns dominated proceedings with his 107 from 134 balls, supported by Keith Parsons' 51 and James Hildreth's 54, as Somerset scored 254 for 5 in their 45 overs. However, then bad weather put an end to the day's play before Warwickshire had a chance to bat. (BBC scorecard)

=== Yorkshire v Somerset (20–23 April) ===
Yorkshire (22pts) beat Somerset (3pts) by an innings and 44 runs

Rain meant no play was possible on the first day at Headingley. The second day was dominated by Ian Harvey, who, at close, was on a career-best 161 not out after being dropped by Andy Caddick on 96. Yorkshire were on 401 for 7. Matthew Wood had added 95 in 174 balls earlier in the day.

The third day Somerset acting captain, Marcus Trescothick, was away, as his first child was born in the night. On the field Yorkshire declared on 501 for 9, after Harvey got 209 not out, and Tim Bresnan 74. Their eighth-wicket partnership of 238 is the second-highest for Yorkshire after the 292 put on by Lord Hawke and Bobby Peel in 1896. Somerset, batting with 10 men, lost opener Sanath Jayasuriya for 0 after 3 balls, and were all out for 182. Following on Somerset plummeted to 10 for 3, and then 37 for 4 (which, given Trescothick's absence, meant that they only had five batsmen left). However, they avoided losing further wickets on the third day, finishing on 109 for 4 at close, still 310 runs behind.

Somerset clung on for 66 overs on the fourth and final day, with John Francis carrying his bat for 125 as they recovered to 275. This left Yorkshire with their first win of the campaign, and a comprehensive victory. (BBC scorecard)

=== Yorkshire v Somerset (24 April) ===
Yorkshire (4pts) beat Somerset (0pts) by 5 wickets

The home side won easily at Headingley. The Sabres batted first and made 209 for 9 in their 45 overs, with four batsmen out with scores between 25 and 40. Former England Under-19 player Tim Bresnan took four for 25 for Yorkshire Phoenix. Yorkshire were always in control, thanks to a third-wicket partnership of 84 in 15 overs between Phil Jaques, who scored 84 off 78 balls, and Michael Lumb. Despite two late wickets, Yorkshire finished in style to win by 5 wickets with 32 balls remaining. (Cricinfo scorecard)

=== Somerset v Essex (27–30 April) ===
Essex (22pts) beat Somerset (2pts) by nine wickets

On 35 overs were possible on the first day. On a green Taunton pitch, Somerset fared poorly against Essex's seam attack. Alex Tudor, who had moved from Surrey, took the first two wickets, including Marcus Trescothick for 4. Somerset were on 119 for 5 at stumps.

Somerset were soon dismissed on the Thursday for 190. Essex's youngsters, Alastair Cook, who looked to be headed for an England call-up before long, and Ravinder Bopara, aged 20 and 19 respectively, made merry with the bat. Although the pitch did not seam as much as the first day, they put on 181 together. Cook was finally out bowled for 111, and Bopara not out for 71 at close, with Essex on 224 for 3, 34 runs ahead.

Bopara could not add to his overnight total on the third day, as he was caught off Richard Johnson's bowling. But Essex were able to take control, finally declaring on 427 for 8 when Tudor was run out for 57. Somerset's fast bowlers, Johnson and Andy Caddick had picked up three wickets each, but had not been able to stop the flow of runs. Foster was not out on 78 when the declaration came. In reply, Somerset fared okay till Trescothick went with the score on 57, and then, at 65 for 1, Andre Adams, Essex's New Zealand import took a hat-trick. Mike Burns edged an outswinger, and Sanath Jayasuriya and James Hildreth were both leg before. With Adams picking up one more wicket before the close of play, Somerset finished on 128 for 5, still 109 runs off making Essex bat again.

On the Saturday, Somerset's tail was quickly reduced to 180 for 8. There was then something of a rearguard action with 63 put on by Caddick and Robert Turner for the ninth wicket, and Turner and Nixon McLean putting on 70 for the tenth. This left Essex with a target of 77 to win, which they did easily with the loss of just one wicket. (BBC scorecard)

=== Somerset v Leicestershire (1 May) ===
Somerset (4pts) beat Leicestershire (0pts) by 8 wickets

The Leicestershire Foxes were restricted to 211 for 8 at Taunton, with Aaron Laraman the pick of the Somerset bowlers - his bowling analysis read 9-2-17-2. Four Leicestershire batsmen passed 30, yet the highest score of the innings was Paul Nixon's 41. John Francis and Keith Parsons then completed the win for the Sabres with 73 and 91 respectively, sharing a third-wicket partnership of 157. This gave Somerset their first win in any competition this season, and meant that the Foxes were still waiting for their first win. (BBC scorecard)

=== Somerset v Surrey (2 May) ===
Somerset (4pts) beat Surrey (0pts) by 99 runs (D/L method)

Surrey Lions were never in this game, which was played at Taunton. The Sabres totalled a mammoth 325 for 6 in their 44 overs, with Sanath Jayasuriya (61 off 49), Marcus Trescothick (52 off 43) and Keith Parsons (85 off 75) doing most of the damage. The Lions were never in the hunt in reply. Whilst Ali Brown top-scored with a 37-ball 65, including seven fours and three sixes, wickets fell at regular intervals, and they finally finished on 226 for 9, 99 behind. (Cricinfo scorecard)

=== Leicestershire v Somerset (4 May) ===
Leicestershire beat Somerset by 3 wickets to progress to Round Two of the C&G Trophy

It was an unusual game at Grace Road, which was all done by 3.30pm. The ball swung greatly, and there was seam movement, and Charl Willoughby of Leicestershire made the most of them first, taking 6 for 16 as Somerset were dismissed for 94 - though it could have been much worse, as they were 58 for 9 before Ian Blackwell and Simon Francis attacked and added 36 for the last wicket. Marcus Trescothick, the Somerset captain, who only made 11 said, "Conditions were not conducive to one-day cricket, that's for sure. Unfortunately, we lost the toss and had the worst of it, but we still thought we could win because we have more consistent length bowlers. Even 130 or so could have been a great score."

Leicestershire themselves struggled in reply, and Somerset took wickets regularly, reducing the hosts to 70 for 7. However, they were not able to take another, as Leicestershire ended on 96 for 7 - Ottis Gibson and Claude Henderson adding 26 for the eighth wicket, Leicestershire's highest partnership of the match. (Cricinfo scorecard)

=== Durham v Somerset (6–9 May) ===
Durham (19pts) beat Somerset (5pts) by four wickets

Durham saw off the Andy Caddick scare against Somerset to win a close match by four wickets. Somerset chose to bat after winning the toss at Stockton-on-Tees, in the first match at this ground in six years. England fast bowler Steve Harmison continued his return to form, removing both Somerset openers, but conceded many runs in the process, and it was England ODI all-rounder Paul Collingwood who was the star, taking the wickets of the Somerset top-scorers James Hildreth (caught by Gareth Breese for 70) and Ian Blackwell (bowled for 48) in addition to the three last lower-order wickets. Somerset were all out for 252 in just 63.3 overs.

In reply, Durham struggled with playing Caddick, as he removed four Durham batsmen for single-figure scores. Only Liam Plunkett (74 not out) and Mark Davies (62) managed to play Caddick with some success, and that was on the second day - at stumps on day one, Caddick had taken five wickets and reduced Durham to 141/7. Plunkett and Davies, batting at 8 and 10 respectively, saved the innings to 298 all out and a lead of 46 runs - while Caddick was taken around to end with six for 106.

Harmison and Collingwood continued in the style of the first innings, although this time it was the real pace bowler who took the most wicket. On the afternoon of the second day, he again took both openers - including England opener Marcus Trescothick, and when Ian Blackwell (87) and Caddick threatened to run away with it with their partnership of 78 for the last wicket, it was Harmison who got Blackwell out, caught by Liam Plunkett. Durham were set a tricky target of 243, but the Jamaican-born all-rounder Gareth Breese saw off the challenge of Caddick, who took yet another six-for - this time for 98 - to end with match figures of 12 for 104. However, he was the only bowler to dig in, and Michael Hussey (51), Dale Benkenstein (51) and the aforementioned Breese with 79 not out saw Durham reach the target to preserve their unbeaten run in the Championship. (Cricinfo scorecard)

=== Scotland v Somerset (11 May) ===
Somerset (4pts) beat Scotland (0pts) by 16 runs

Somerset Sabres won thanks to a slogging effort by all-rounder Ian Blackwell who rescued them from a potentially dangerous position at Edinburgh. Winning the toss and batting, Scottish Saltires' bowlers Asim Butt, Majid Haq and Paul Hoffmann (who bowled 9 overs for 14 runs) tied the visitors down to 145 for 5 before Blackwell came on. Blackwell then proceeded to slam everything out of sight, smacking six sixes and seven fours in his 86 and lifting Somerset to 264 for 7. Colin Smith was the star of Scotland's reply, making 67, but they were never seriously in the chase, especially after Andy Caddick removed Pakistani all-rounder Yasir Arafat and Smith. (Cricinfo scorecard)

=== Somerset v Lancashire (20–23 May) ===
Lancashire (11pts) drew with Somerset (7pts)

Rain ravaged the match between Somerset and Lancashire allowing little play on the first three days. Between the showers, Lancashire had Somerset at 48 for 2 on the first day, but the little play that was possible after that gave Mike Burns (87) and Sanath Jayasuriya (72 not out after three days) opportunity to increase the score to 195 for 3 on day 3. A draw looked more than likely, even if the sides would agree to forfeiting an innings. The fourth day was a full day of cricket, and Muttiah Muralitharan took five for 56 for Lancashire as they bowled Somerset out for 294. Iain Sutcliffe then lifted Lancashire to four batting points and 351 for 3 declared with his 150, well helped by an unbeaten century from Australian Brad Hodge. (Cricinfo scorecard)

=== Northamptonshire v Somerset (25–27 May) ===
Somerset (21 pts) beat Northamptonshire (8 pts) by six wickets

Somerset won the toss at Northampton and chose to bowl – and although they got the hosts Northamptonshire out in a day, Martin Love (166) and wicketkeeper Riki Wessels (son of Kepler) (102) made quick centuries to lift the hosts to 408. Conversely, however, two Northamptonshire batsmen batting at 4 and 5 perished for ducks to Richard Johnson. Somerset replied well, though, with 53 from opener Matthew Wood, but rash strokes gave wickets around everywhere as Somerset made 356 – admittedly only 52 behind. Off-spinner Jason Brown got six wickets for 112, just as many as he had taken before this game, while Ian Blackwell played a typical 59 off 77 balls.

Northamptonshire lost the wicket of Bilal Shafayat in their eight overs before stumps on day two but could still be reasonably pleased with the first two days' play. However, on the third day, their side collapsed with Gareth Andrew taking three for 31 as they crashed to 100 all out – Ian Blackwell removing two in his only over, which was also a maiden. In chasing 155, Somerset had some problems in tackling the bowling of Johann Louw, who took two wickets, but still managed a relatively comfortable six-wicket win. (Cricinfo scorecard)

=== Somerset v Sussex (30 May) ===
Sussex (4pts) beat Somerset (0pts) by 2 wickets

Sussex edged past Somerset with 2 balls and 2 wickets remaining. Somerset won the toss, batted, and fell to 88 for 5 against Sussex's tight bowling before Ian Blackwell smashed 10 sixes and 10 fours as he made 134 not out off only 71 balls. 4 of his sixes came in the 40th over, bowled by Mushtaq Ahmed: the first three balls went for six, then there were two singles, before Blackwell smashed the last ball out of the ground into the car park. His quickfire innings helped Somerset to 297 for 6 off their 45 overs. In reply Matt Prior made 77, but Sussex looked like a defeated side after 4 wickets from Keith Parsons sent them to 201 for 7, but Johannes van der Wath smashed 73 off 43 balls to sneak the victory, sharing an 82-run ninth-wicket stand with Jason Lewry. (Cricinfo scorecard)

=== Leicestershire v Somerset (1–4 June) ===
Leicestershire (10pts) drew with Somerset (7pts)

Rain prevented any play on the first day at Oakham. The second day saw Leicestershire score 294 for 7, with HD Ackerman striking a century. They finished their innings on 338 a few overs into the third morning. Somerset did not apply themselves well in their reply, as they were dismissed cheaply for 105, and Leicestershire enforced the follow-on with a lead of 233 and just over a day still to play. John Francis scored a battling century as Somerset worked hard for the draw on the last day. They lost only 3 wickets as they effectively put up shop, scoring 225 in 100 overs to get the 4 points. (Cricinfo scorecard)

=== Leicestershire v Somerset (5 June) ===
Leicestershire (4pts) beat Somerset (0pts) by 71 runs

Leicestershire Foxes moved out of the bottom place with a comfortable win over Somerset Sabres at Oakham School. With Dinesh Mongia top-scoring with 75 as no Somerset bowler dug into the Leicestershire innings, they made 217 for 4 with relative ease, before crumbling to the left-arm spin of Mongia, as he took four wickets for 12 runs including captain and top-scorer Graeme Smith. Smith made 61 in a Somerset innings were only four batsmen made it into double figures, and the visitors crumbled to 146 all out. (Cricinfo scorecard)

=== Somerset v Worcestershire (8–11 June) ===
Worcestershire (22pts) beat Somerset (8pts) by eight wickets

Having won the toss and chosen to bat first at Bath, Somerset made 408 in the first innings including 127 by Matthew Wood and 55 by South Africa's Graeme Smith, captaining the side. Worcestershire put on 423 in reply, Ben Smith going on to make 140 and Stephen Moore 86 after both were dropped at slip in double figures by Ian Blackwell. Andy Caddick took five for 132 in a 31-over effort for Somerset. Worcestershire then cemented their control over the game by dismissing Somerset for 152 in the second innings, with Matt Mason taking 5 for 34. The Worcestershire batsmen achieved the target of 138 for the loss of just 2 wickets, Moore making his second fifty of the match with an unbeaten 66. (Cricinfo scorecard)

=== Somerset v Kent (12 June) ===
Kent (4pts) beat Somerset (0pts) by 74 runs

Martin van Jaarsveld continued his stunning form for Kent Spitfires with 114 against Somerset Sabres which lifted the visitors to a massive 319 for 5, as the bowlers were smashed to all corners of the Recreation Ground in Bath. In reply, Ian Blackwell smashed 57 off 42 balls, but it was never enough as Somerset were all out in 37.3 overs - with 45 balls potentially remaining of their innings - for 245. (Cricinfo scorecard)

=== Somerset v Australians (15 June) ===
Somerset won by four wickets

Somerset shocked everyone with a nail-biting win over Australia cricket team at Taunton, their first win over the Australians since 1977. Somerset were placed mid-table in the second division of the National League, and no one believed they should have any chance against an Australian team only missing Adam Gilchrist. And Australia backed that up with the bat - Matthew Hayden retired after a fun hit-out for 76, captain Ricky Ponting the same for 80, and Australia tonked 342 for 5.

Graeme Smith and Sanath Jayasuriya, however, fought back for Somerset. The pair opened, and put on 197 for the first wicket in little over 20 overs - Smith smashing his way to a massive 68-ball hundred, ending with 108 with 17 fours and a six. Jayasuriya, not wishing to be worse, made a 77-ball ton - before getting out for 101 a bit later. The platform was set, however, and 24-year-old James Hildreth could steady the ship after Somerset had lost some wickets to part-time bowler Michael Hussey. Hildreth made 38 not out off 24 balls and saw them to a victory with 19 balls and four wickets to spare - more comfortable than the match looked for the most part. (Cricinfo scorecard)

=== Somerset v Scotland (17 June) ===
Scotland (4pts) beat Somerset (0pts) by 15 runs

Only a couple of days ago, the lads from Somerset had beaten Australia's finest by five wickets, chasing the highest score in one-day matches. Now, they failed to chase down 233 set by the Scottish Saltires, after Jonathan Beukes smashed 92 and Yasir Arafat supplied with a 20-ball 32 including two sixes. It started well enough for Somerset, Graeme Smith continuing his fine form with 74, leading his team to 158 for 4. But then, the wheels fell off. Paul Hoffmann snared the important wicket of James Hildreth for 49, the lower order rolled over meekly to Arafat (who got 3-33), and with Jon Francis injured, the Sabres managed to lose the match by 15 runs as they were all out for 218. (Cricinfo scorecard)

=== Glamorgan v Somerset (22 June) ===
Glamorgan (2pts) beat Somerset (0pts) on losing fewer wickets

James Hildreth scored a quick 46 off 26 deliveries at Sophia Gardens as Somerset Sabres set a challenging target of 183 to Glamorgan Dragons. No Glamorgan bowler really had control over the Somerset batsmen, and yet they lost their wickets. A highlight of the innings was the effort of Somerset's No. 9 Gareth Andrew, who smashed three fours in his first three balls and then was bowled with the fourth. In reply, Glamorgan got to 126 for 2 before part-timers Keith Parsons and Hildreth got the better of them and took wickets at a leisure - however, Alex Wharf hung in there with Michael Powell and carried the Dragons to 183 for 8 after the 20 overs were up. The crowd seemed content with the one point and a tie, but the speaker informed the crowd of the actual result, which of course was pleasing to the home side. (Cricinfo scorecard)

=== Somerset v Worcestershire (23 June) ===
Somerset (2pts) beat Worcestershire (0pts) by 15 runs

Despite captain Graeme Smith becoming victim of Zander de Bruyn's bowling for just two runs, Somerset Sabres still posted a big target, thanks to Matthew Wood, who made 94 off only 35 balls before falling to Nadeem Malik six short of a century. Wood's smashing helped the Sabres to 210 for 6, although no other batsman passed 30. Graeme Hick tried to emulate Wood, but could only make 87 before Ian Blackwell got the better of him, and from then on Worcestershire never really had a chance. Blackwell finished with two for 20 in his four overs, and could take his share of the honour for Somerset's surprising win. (Cricinfo scorecard)

=== Somerset v Glamorgan (27 June) ===
Somerset (2pts) beat Glamorgan (0pts) by 89 runs

James Hildreth smashed 71 runs off 37 balls to lift Somerset Sabres to a convincing victory at Taunton. Along with Keith Parsons making 57 off 28, they made a dent in the theory that spinners are useful in Twenty20 cricket, as experienced off-spinner Robert Croft was dispatched for 50 runs in four overs. The slow left arm bowler Dean Cosker was also taken for 45 in his four. The visitors' reply never really got going, Ian Blackwell taking four Glamorgan Dragons wickets for 26 runs as the Welshmen crumbled to 123 all out, Sourav Ganguly top-scoring with 35. (Cricinfo scorecard)

=== Northamptonshire v Somerset (29 June) ===
Somerset (2pts) beat Northamptonshire (0pts) by five wickets

At Northampton, Andy Caddick served up an unusually economical spell, taking two for 12 in three overs despite two wides. That helped tie the hosts Northamptonshire Steelbacks down to 95 for 6 in 12 overs in the rain-shortened game, and with Graeme Smith and Keith Parsons at the crease and the score 55 for 1, things looked bright for Somerset Sabres. Two wickets from Jason Brown helped put the odds for a Northamptonshire win down, but Somerset prevailed, Parsons hitting the winning runs on the last ball as Somerset finished on 97 for 5. (Cricinfo scorecard)

=== Gloucestershire v Somerset (1 July) ===
No result; Gloucestershire (1pt), Somerset (1pt)

Only thirteen overs of play was possible at The County Ground, Bristol. By that time, two Somerset Sabres batsmen had departed for golden ducks - Graeme Smith and James Hildreth - and Somerset were 61 for 7. Gloucestershire Gladiators would have fancied their chances, but rain intervened to spoil the party. (Cricinfo scorecard)

=== Somerset v Northamptonshire (2 July) ===
Northamptonshire (2pts) beat Somerset (0pts) by five wickets

Despite Graeme Smith making a 53-ball century, and pairing up with Matthew Wood for 129 for the first wicket, Somerset Sabres still lost the match at Taunton. Smith's 105 helped Somerset set a target of 190, but none of the bowlers conceded less than seven an over to Northamptonshire Steelbacks' batting. Simon Francis was the worst, ending with 57 conceded runs in four overs, while Riki Wessels hit 49 not out with four sixes off 22 balls, and the Sabres had to see that Northamptonshire won with an over to spare. (Cricinfo scorecard)

=== Warwickshire v Somerset (4 July) ===
Warwickshire (2pts) beat Somerset (0pts) by 47 runs

Warwickshire Bears jumped on the quarter-final train just as it seemed to be leaving the station, grabbing the ticket out of the hands of Somerset Sabres. Neil Carter and Ian Bell opened the batting and scored quickly, sending the score to 40 for 1, but part-timer William Durston got three wickets in quick succession to have three for four at one point. Trevor Penney then smashed three successive sixes off Durston to end with 35 not out off 13 balls. Thus, Warwickshire closed on 172 for 8, and patient bowling from Carter and Alex Loudon sent them crumbling to 89 for 6. Arul Suppiah and Durston paired up for 27 for the seventh wicket, but when Suppiah was bowled by Jonathan Trott it looked hopeless for Somerset. Jamie Anyon wrapped them up with a hat-trick to end Somerset's innings on 125. (Cricinfo scorecard)

=== Somerset v Gloucestershire (6 July) ===
Somerset (2pts) beat Gloucestershire (0pts) by 95 runs

Somerset Sabres made it through to the quarter-finals after recording a massive score of 228 for 5 in twenty overs - the highest team total in Twenty20 Cup history, eclipsing a record set a couple of weeks earlier. The most economical bowler was Steve Kirby, and he conceded 35 runs in four overs, while the other four where all taken for more than 40 runs. Graeme Smith top-scored with 53, Ian Blackwell made 45, and James Hildreth recorded 32 off 10 balls - 28 from six shots to the boundary and four from the other four deliveries. Somerset's innings featured eight sixes and twenty extras. Gloucestershire Gladiators, who were second in the Midland/Wales/West group before this game at Taunton, had to go for expansive strokes, and were all out in sixteen overs, Gareth Andrew taking four for 22 while Craig Spearman top scored with 35 off 17 balls. Keith Parsons also contributed bowling-wise, taking three for 12. (Cricinfo scorecard)

=== Somerset v Leicestershire (8–11 July) ===
Somerset (22pts) beat Leicestershire (6pts) by ten wickets

Graeme Smith was the difference between the two teams at Taunton. After Leicestershire had made 330 in the first innings, with wicket-keeper Paul Nixon top scoring with 62 not out, it was time for the South African captain. Farming the strike exquisitely, he smashed 27 fours and eleven sixes in a career highest score of 311 - while his partners were sensible enough to not leave him stranded. Thus, Somerset made 566, and Andy Caddick and Charl Langeveldt paired up with good fast bowling to send Leicestershire down to 189 for 6. All-rounder Ian Blackwell then took three tail-end wickets to leave a target of 18 runs with more than a day to spare, and Somerset knocked off the runs inside six overs to win by ten wickets. (Cricinfo scorecard)

=== Northamptonshire v Somerset (18 July) ===
Somerset beat Northamptonshire by four wickets to progress to the Semi-Finals of the Twenty20 Cup

Northamptonshire Steelbacks failed to take full use of their home advantage, and Somerset Sabres escaped with a four-wicket win to reach their first semi-final of the Twenty20 Cup. Northamptonshire's batsmen made quick scores between 20 and 30, but Ian Blackwell's spell mid-match of three for 16 pegged Northamptonshire back to 118 for 6. Ben Phillips then made an unbeaten 27 to lift his team to 154 for 8, however, but he couldn't take a wicket while bowling. Despite three run-outs, Somerset made it through on the penultimate ball, as Matthew Wood recorded 58 and Blackwell a 16-ball 31 to lay the foundation before Keith Parsons set the pace late on with an unbeaten 38. (Cricinfo scorecard)

=== Kent v Somerset (24 July) ===
Somerset (4pts) beat Kent (0pts) by eight wickets

The match between Kent Spitfires and Somerset Sabres at St Lawrence Ground was shortened to 16 overs owing to bad weather. Kent were sent in to bat, and lost three early wickets, two to Andy Caddick and one to Richard Johnson, for only 11 runs. Rob Key and Justin Kemp both made 17, and James Tredwell smacked two sixes for his nine-ball 22 as Kent came back to 90 for 6, which was still below six runs an over. Tredwell also took two for 19 with his off breaks, but Graeme Smith hit nine fours as he made his way to an unbeaten 56, and James Hildreth won the match for Somerset with a six off Tredwell, with 20 balls potentially remaining in their chase. (Cricinfo scorecard)

=== Somerset v Durham (26–29 July) ===
Durham (22pts) beat Somerset (5pts) by 207 runs

Durham continued their march through Division Two of the County Championship, recording their sixth win of the season thanks mainly to Paul Collingwood and spineless batting from Somerset. Collingwood made 181, for his second successive match with a century, and along with half-centuries from Mike Hussey, Gordon Muchall and Gareth Breese it lifted Durham to 476 for 9 declared seven overs into day three after the second day had been broken up by the rain. Jamaican spinner Gareth Breese then snared five for 83 as Somerset made their way to 303 in 68 overs, while Durham got to 208 for 1 in reply before declaring for the second time in the match - only Graeme Smith getting a wicket for Somerset. Smith started positively with fellow opener James Francis, adding 56 for the first wicket, but Breese added another four to his tally as he finished with match figures of nine for 138. Ian Blackwell played an unusually cautious knock of 8 off 62 balls, but he was eventually lbw to Michael Lewis, and Somerset subsided for 174 to lose by 207 runs. (Cricinfo scorecard)

=== Leicestershire v Somerset (30 July) ===
Somerset won by four runs and progress to the Twenty20 Cup final

Defending champions Leicestershire Foxes failed to take care of an excellent position against Somerset Sabres, as the second semi-final became a low-scoring, yet thrilling affair. After Dinesh Mongia had taken three for 30 to set Somerset back to 139 for 7 after Graeme Smith (with 29), Matthew Wood (38) and Marcus Trescothick (25) had lifted them to 89 for 1 at one point during the innings. Carl Gazzard, Somerset's young wicketkeeper, made 26 to lift them to a final total of 157 for 9.

In reply, Darren Maddy and HD Ackerman lifted Leicestershire to 74 for no loss after eight overs, requiring "only" 83 from the last twelve. However, Ian Blackwell took three quick wickets to send Leicestershire to 90 for 3, Richard Johnson (figures of 3-0-21-3), Keith Parsons (3-0-15-0) and William Durston (3-0-18-1) bowled tightly to frustrate the Leicestershire batsmen, and despite a last-ball six from Paul Nixon, Somerset won by four runs and qualified for the final, where they would be facing Lancashire Lightning. (Cricinfo scorecard)

=== Lancashire v Somerset (30 July) ===
Somerset beat Lancashire by seven wickets and won the 2005 Twenty20 Cup

Somerset Sabres completed their run by springing the final upset to beat Lancashire Lightning in the Twenty20 Cup final. It should perhaps have been renamed Sixteen16, because rain earlier in the day delayed the schedule and meant that the final had been shortened to 16 overs a side, while the semi-finals had both been 20 overs. However, Somerset didn't mind - their strongest batsmen were their numbers one and two, Graeme Smith and Marcus Trescothick, and the more relative impact these two would have, the better for the Sabres. Their task was made easier, though, as Somerset fast bowler Andy Caddick dug out a couple of early Lancashire wickets, which was followed a run-out and two wickets in two balls from Richard Johnson, as Lancashire crawled to 41 for 5.

Australian-born Stuart Law stood tall at the crease, defying the Somerset bowlers to make 59 before being run out on the very last ball, but Somerset only needed 115 from 16 overs - a run rate of 7.19. Smith and Trescothick started positively, before Trescothick's England teammate Andrew Flintoff had him edge behind to Warren Hegg for 10. With two more wickets falling, Lancashire would perhaps have fancied their chances with the Somerset score on 65 for 3, but Smith defied them with an unbeaten 64, adding 53 in a fourth-wicket stand with young James Hildreth to guide Somerset to the target with seven wickets and eleven balls to spare. (Cricinfo scorecard)

=== Sussex v Somerset (1 August) ===
Sussex (4pts) beat Somerset (0pts) by 11 runs

Robin Montgomerie and Matt Prior opened the batting with a partnership of 13, and Murray Goodwin added a further 97 with Montgomerie for the third wicket, as Sussex Sharks made 266 for 3 in their 45 overs. Montgomerie's 132 not out was his highest List A score Somerset Sabres lost wickets regularly, and despite dispatching Mushtaq Ahmed for 70 in 9 overs, they finished on 255 for 9 - Michael Yardy taking four for 26, while Ian Blackwell top-scored for Somerset with 57. (Cricinfo scorecard)

=== Derbyshire v Somerset (3 August) ===
Derbyshire (4pts) beat Somerset (0pts) by 15 runs

Derbyshire Phantoms jumped into fifth in the table thanks to their win over Somerset Sabres, who for the second time in that week conceded more than 260 in 45 overs. Michael Di Venuto slashed 11 fours on his way to 87, and despite two maiden overs from Andy Caddick, Derbyshire made 277 for 5. Carl Gazzard and Malaysian Arul Suppiah gave Somerset a chance of chasing the big total with their 125-run second-wicket stand, but Jonathan Moss took four for 60 with his off breaks and Andy Gray three for 47 with medium-pace. That plunged Somerset to 241 for 9 before William Durston made 24 not out to see Somerset to the end of 45 overs - still 16 runs short of victory. (Cricinfo scorecard)

=== Derbyshire v Somerset (4–7 August) ===
Somerset (21pts) beat Derbyshire (7pts) by five runs

Arul Suppiah, James Hildreth and Wesley Durston helped themselves to boundaries and Somerset to a big first-innings total in a close match against Derbyshire. Suppiah passed fifty for the first time in his first-class career with a five-hour 123, while Durston was stranded on 146 not out - his only century of the season. Graeme Welch took four for 82 to be Derbyshire's most effective bowler, but that didn't say much, as they conceded 460 to Somerset's batsmen. However, Derbyshire's tactic of slow attrition worked well against Somerset's frontline bowlers, Andy Caddick and Ian Blackwell. They made 438, in a mammoth 149 overs, before declaring with eight men down - four Derbyshire batsmen making fifties, Ant Botha top-scoring with 91, while 40 overs from Caddick yielded four for 102. Somerset weren't too keen on a big target either, making 61 in 32 third-day overs, as the match looked to peter into one of the most drab draws of the Championship season.

However, on the fourth day, 426 runs were hit and enough wickets fell to get a result. Blackwell smacked 88 not out in 85 balls as Somerset added 184 in the first fifty overs of the day before declaring, which set Derbyshire 268 to win in 50 overs - a good one-day total. Derbyshire attempted the chase, Jon Moss slashing 106 and adding runs with Luke Sutton, and at 247 for 4, Derbyshire looked to have a good chance at winning it. However, two run-outs and two wickets each for Blackwell and Caddick saw Derbyshire lose their last six men for 15 runs, and Somerset snatched a five-run win. (Cricinfo scorecard)

=== Somerset v Yorkshire (10–13 August) ===
Somerset (12pts) drew with Yorkshire (11pts)

Yorkshire and Somerset fought out a high-scoring draw at Taunton. Having opted to bat first, the visitors lost Joe Sayers for a duck, but Phil Jaques and Michael Lumb made centuries to see Yorkshire to 368 for 4. Then, Charl Langeveldt took the wickets of Craig White and Lumb, and Deon Kruis edged Andy Caddick behind for a duck to leave Yorkshire 377 for 7 overnight. Caddick wrapped up the innings on the second morning, finishing with six for 96, before Somerset opener Michael Wood started notching up boundaries. He made 35 fours and one six in a nine-hour cameo which yielded a total of 297 - before he was caught by Tim Bresnan 14 short of Somerset's highest innings for the season. With help from Ian Blackwell, who made 62, and Keith Parsons' 94, Somerset amassed 581 in a day and a half. Caddick got an early breakthrough for Somerset, but Sayers and Anthony McGrath defied them, with a 119-run partnership for the second wicket. Only six overs of play was possible on day four before rain set in to ensure a drawn game. (Cricinfo scorecard)

=== Somerset v Yorkshire (14 August) ===
Somerset (4pts) beat Yorkshire (0pts) by two runs

In a high-scoring match at The County Ground, Taunton, Matthew Wood and Ian Blackwell both cracked centuries as Somerset Sabres made their way to 345 for 4. Blackwell's 114 came off just 61 balls, with a total of 74 runs in boundaries. Paul Jaques, Ismail Dawood and Michael Wood all made half-centuries, but in the end Yorkshire Phoenix needed 23 to win off the last over, number 11 Deon Kruis facing Blackwell. The first ball was a dot ball, but a six and three fours followed - however, Kruis needed four for the tie and six for the win on the last ball. He couldn't get the ball to the boundary, and Somerset prevailed by two runs. (Cricinfo scorecard)

=== Worcestershire v Somerset (16–19 August) ===
Worcestershire (22pts) beat Somerset (4pts) by an innings and 56 runs

Somerset were bowled out for 318 on the first day at New Road, but for the efforts of Malaysian Arul Suppiah (who made 72), wicket-keeper Carl Gazzard (74) and the 18-year-old debutant from Taunton, Robert Woodman (46 not out), it would have been far worse. The Worcestershire bowlers shared out the wickets, and Somerset were in real trouble at 57 for 5, but Suppiah stayed calm and the lower order made good contributions. Nadeem Malik got the best figures for Worcestershire, with three for 63.

However, Somerset's bowling left something to be desired. After an opening stand of 51, Worcestershire powered onwards, with number three Zander de Bruyn smashing 28 fours in a four-hour 161. Ben Smith and Steve Davies also got centuries, as Worcestershire at one point were 618 for 3. Three wickets from Keith Parsons set them back, but Worcestershire could still declaration and forfeiture declare on 696 for 8. Suppiah started well once again, making 34 in a 110-run partnership with Matthew Wood as Somerset made their way to 138 for 1. Then spinners Ray Price and Gareth Batty shared the next seven wickets for 70 runs, and Somerset imploded to 209 for 8 while still needing 169 to avoid the innings defeat. A good rearguard from number eight Carl Gazzard, and his partners Andy Caddick and Simon Francis saw Somerset first past 250 and then past 300. They looked to make Worcestershire bat again when Kabir Ali had Francis bowled - his only wicket of the innings, as he finished with expensive figures of 8.5-0-50-1. Batty and Price bowled 87 of Worcestershire's total of 108.5 overs, and Price's 44 overs included 21 maidens. (Cricinfo scorecard)

=== Somerset v Durham (21 August) ===
Somerset (4pts) beat Durham (0pts) by five wickets

Durham Dynamos failed to take the opportunity of taking a lead in Division Two of the National League, as they went down by five wickets at Taunton. Having won the toss, they struggled to hit out initially, Gavin Hamilton recording 22 off 51 balls and 18-year-old Robert Woodman bowling two maiden overs. However, Dale Benkenstein made an unbeaten 60 and Gareth Breese a quickfire 28 as Durham made their way to 222 for 7 in 45 overs, William Durston getting the best figures for Somerset Sabres with two for 32 - admittedly in five overs - while South African Charl Langeveldt took two for 33 in nine overs. The Sabres hit out well chasing the target, Matthew Wood continuing on his good run of form with 76, and Keith Parsons worked well with Durston, adding 83 runs for the sixth wicket to guide Somerset home after Neil Killeen and Gareth Breese had taken two wickets each to set Somerset back to 143 for 5. (Cricinfo scorecard)

=== Essex v Somerset (24–27 August) ===
Somerset (16pts) beat Essex (5pts) by five wickets

Somerset exploited Essex' declarations to take a five-wicket win despite rain dominating at Colchester, Somerset's fourth win of the season. After the first day was over, Somerset's overseas player Charl Langeveldt dug out Grant Flower on the second morning, but good contributions from the rest of the batting line-up - William Jefferson top-scoring with 93 - gave Essex a relatively comfortable 220 for 5 by stumps on day two. They powered on to 400 before declaring, losing only one wicket while James Foster made 107 not out. When Somerset were asked to bat, André Nel whipped out two Somerset wickets with the first three balls of the game, but no Essex bowler could get any more wickets as James Hildreth made 76 not out before the close of day three to set Somerset to 112 for 2. Overnight, the two captains agreed to a mutual forfeiture of innings, so that Essex would not have to bat again. Hence, Somerset would have to chase 289 in a day to win, while Essex would have to bowl them out. André Nel removed Michael Wood for a duck again, but Arul Suppiah added a quick 29, and former England Under-19 player Hildreth settled in well. He made his second unbeaten score of the match, this time worth 125, guiding Somerset past the winning target in 66.1 overs with five wickets to spare. Danish Kaneria bowled 24 of Essex' 66 overs, but to little effect, ending with one wicket for 80 runs, while Nel got William Durston for a duck to end with four wickets for the match - all ducks. (Cricinfo scorecard)

=== Surrey v Somerset (28 August) ===
Somerset (4pts) beat Surrey (0pts) by five wickets

Surrey Lions made 237 for 7 batting first at The Oval, despite three wickets from Malaysian Arul Suppiah. The stage was set for a bigger score with James Benning and Mark Butcher in with the score 135 for 1, but Suppiah and Ian Blackwell broke through with wickets to prevent high scoring rates towards the end. Somerset Sabres, and in particular Blackwell, were intent on winning this match. Blackwell hit six sixes and seven fours in a lightning-quick 88, adding 120 with James Hildreth for the fourth wicket before his eventual dismissal - to the part-time off spin of Mark Ramprakash. Despite Nayan Doshi getting another wicket, it was too late for Surrey, as Hildreth added 17 with William Durston to see them across the line with five overs to spare. (Cricinfo scorecard)

=== Somerset v Warwickshire (5 September) ===
Somerset (4pts) beat Warwickshire (0pts) by four wickets

Jonathan Trott set up Warwickshire Bears for a big total at Taunton, making 112 not out as Warwickshire eased to 278 for 5, also helped by scores in the 40s from Neil Carter, Nick Knight and Trevor Penney. Somerset Sabres scored quickly in reply, Matthew Wood spending 39 balls for his 53 before being bowled by Trott, but at 187 for 6, the odds were long. However, Wesley Durston and John Francis added 94 for the seventh wicket, as Somerset won with an over to spare. Warwickshire's opening bowler Dougie Brown only bowled two of a possible nine overs, conceding 23 runs. (Cricinfo scorecard)

=== Somerset v Northamptonshire (7–10 September) ===
Northamptonshire (12pts) drew with Somerset (10pts)

Ian Blackwell and Arul Suppiah made scores of 98 and 91 respectively, as Somerset made their way to 396 batting first at Taunton, although the lower order struggled against the spin of Monty Panesar - who dug out Richard Johnson and Charl Langeveldt for ducks. Matthew Wood set the pace, adding 63 with James Francis in an opening partnership where Francis only contributed 8 before he was lbw to Steven Crook, who had changed counties from Lancashire to Northamptonshire. That was Crook's only wicket of the match, however, as he finished with match figures of 25-2-107-1.

Northamptonshire got off to a bad start, losing the first three wickets for 76 runs, but centuries from Usman Afzaal, who made 112, and David Sales, ending on 154 before being caught and bowled by Richard Johnson, lifted them back with a 175-run stand for the fourth wicket. Fifties from all-rounders Damien Wright (who added 131 with Sales for the sixth wicket), Simon Crook and Johann Louw lifted Northamptonshire to 574. Then, Wright took two wickets and Somerset fell to four runs for two wickets. Francis made his second half-century and James Hildreth also scored 50, however, leaving Somerset at 163 for 4 at stumps on day three. The match was intriguingly poised, but rain ruined a potentially interesting finish, as no play was possible on day four and the match was drawn. (Cricinfo scorecard)

=== Somerset v Faisalabad (16 September) ===
Faisalabad (2pts) beat Somerset (0pts) by 30 runs

Faisalabad Wolves overcame the reigning English Twenty20 Cup champions Somerset Sabres thanks to the all-round efforts of Mohammad Hafeez. Opening the batting, he hit six sixes and six fours in a 35-ball 79, and helped by the 17 extras and 40 from Ijaz Ahmed junior, the Pakistani club made 207 for 5. Arul Suppiah took one wicket and conceded five runs for Somerset in his lone over, but was still taken off, possibly due to the two wides he bowled. Somerset needed 10.35 off every over, and they took ten off the first, but wicket-keeper Carl Gazzard had to retire hurt and Wood was caught by Hafeez, leaving the score at 31 for 2 (effectively, counting Gazzard's retirement as a wicket) with Ian Blackwell at the crease. He took 14 fours and two sixes in a 48-ball 82, but once he departed the remainder of the batting order failed to keep up with the asking rate of nearly twelve an over. Hafeez wrapped up the tail, taking three for 23, but credit also went to Samiullah Khan, who earlier dismissed Somerset opener Matthew Wood and number four James Hildreth. (Cricinfo scorecard)

=== Leicestershire v Somerset (16 September) ===
Leicestershire (2pts) beat Somerset (0pts) by 66 runs

The hosts Leicestershire Foxes could conceivably have been knocked out of the tournament with a loss in this match, but three knocks worth more than 35 runs and bowling two maiden overs helped them to a 66-run win. HD Ackerman (run-a-ball 28) and Darren Maddy (42) hit plenty of boundaries in the opening overs to give Leicestershire 76 runs for the first wicket. Maddy took a particular liking to young seamer Richard Woodman, whom he took for 16 in an over. Then, both openers fell within the space of three balls, but Dinesh Mongia pushed onward with John Sadler, to add 79 for the third wicket. A few lofted shots to fielders in the deep led to three catches in the final overs, and the final score was 171 for 6, Woodman repairing his figures somewhat with a 19th over that yielded two wickets and went for only five runs, and Leicestershire only added 15 from their last 15 balls.

Somerset Sabres started positively in the chase, making their way to 32 for 2 after four overs, but a wicket maiden over from David Masters - including the wicket of Somerset captain Ian Blackwell - set them back. Their batsmen from three through seven were all dismissed in single figures, and though John Francis made 49, Somerset still needed 91 for the last three wickets. 18-year-old wicket-keeper Sam Spurway made his Somerset debut in this match, standing in for the injured Carl Gazzard, and Spurway made 15 not out, seeing out the last overs as Somerset closed on 106 for 8 to be knocked out of the tournament. (Cricinfo scorecard)

=== Durham v Somerset (18 September) ===
Durham (4pts) beat Somerset (0pts) by five wickets

Durham Dynamos bowled first and used the ball to good effect against the Somerset Sabres at the Riverside Ground, with Neil Killeen and Paul Collingwood getting three wickets each. Seven Somerset batsmen were caught, as Somerset lost their first nine wickets for 94, before Wesley Durston and Simon Francis added a 46-run last-wicket partnership. Killeen conceded only 15 runs in his nine overs. Durston also took two for 21 following his 46 with the bat, but 40 from Gordon Muchall saw Durham to the target with nearly 15 overs to spare, giving them promotion in the National League as well - their second promotion of the week. (Cricinfo scorecard)

=== Somerset v Derbyshire (21–24 September) ===
Derbyshire (22pts) beat Somerset (3pts) by an innings and 18 runs

Half-centuries from James Hildreth and James Francis took Somerset to 259 in 64.5 overs at their home ground at Taunton. Hildreth's 84 included 15 fours, while Francis hit ten fours in his 54. For Derbyshire, all-rounder Graeme Welch took three early wickets for 42, while 19-year-old Wayne White, who had made his first class debut with match figures of one for 123 a week earlier against Yorkshire, ended with four wickets for 77 in just under 13 overs. Chris Bassano and Steve Stubbings then added 87 for the first wicket, and Derbyshire closed on 126 for 1. On the second day, Stubbings continued with Hassan Adnan, and both earned career best scores - Stubbings with 151 and Adnan with 191 not out. Gareth Andrew was the only Somerset bowler to take more than one wicket, ending with four for 134, but Derbyshire made 707 for 7 - a county record - declaring when Luke Sutton fell for 53, leaving Graeme Welch stranded on 99 not out.

Francis then hit a 125-ball century as Somerset battled to save the draw and avoid becoming the first team to lose to Derbyshire for 14 months. But Francis went early on the last morning, the last man out in a collapse that started with 173 for 2 in the morning (Arul Suppiah had been dismissed with the score 172 for 1) and ended on 174 for 5. Somerset captain Ian Blackwell took seventeen fours and two sixes off Derbyshire's bowling in a 67-ball ton, but Welch came back, taking the last three wickets as Derbyshire broke their duck of 21 matches without a win and completed their Championship win since July 2004. (Cricinfo scorecard)

=== Somerset v Derbyshire (25 September) ===
Somerset (4pts) beat Derbyshire (0pts) by 135 runs

Derbyshire Phantoms failed to carry their momentum from the Championship match earlier in the week, and fell to Somerset Sabres and the all-round effort of Ian Blackwell to lose all hopes of promotion. The Sabres were put in to bat, and after Matthew Wood and James Francis added 100 for the first wicket, Blackwell stepped in to bat. He hit 75, the same number of runs as Keith Parsons from number 5, and Somerset closed on 300 for 6. Derbyshire batsmen Ben France and Hassan Adnan started to build towards the target of 301 to win with an 81-run partnership for the second wicket, but both of them were stumped off Blackwell, and he also had three men caught off his bowling to end with five for 26. Malaysian Arul Suppiah also took two for 23, and two run outs left Derbyshire all out for 165. (Cricinfo scorecard)
