= International 20:20 Club Championship =

- Cricket format: Twenty20
- Tournament format(s): Round-robin and knockout
- Host: England
- Champions: (Pakistan) Faisalabad Wolves (1st title)
- Participants: 6
- Matches: 9

The International 20:20 Club Championship was an international Twenty20 competition for club cricket teams. It was held once, hosted by Leicestershire County Cricket Club from 15 to 17 September 2005 and was replaced by Champions League T20 in 2009 as the world championship for T20 club teams. It featured the winners of the domestic Twenty20 competitions from England, Pakistan and Sri Lanka, as well as the Leicestershire Foxes and the PCA Masters XI, a composition of current and past players of international cricket from around the world. The winners were awarded £25,000.

The competition was the first notable attempt at a competition featuring the top domestic Twenty20 teams from around the world. As Twenty20 cricket had only been introduced in 2003, the scale of the competition was limited. Australia, New Zealand and the West Indies were not represented due to their lack of a domestic Twenty20 competition. The competition had limited television coverage, and three of the nine games could not proceed due to bad weather. While this competition was only held once, the creation of an international Twenty20 club tournament was executed successfully with the Champions League Twenty20 in 2009.

== Teams ==
- (England) Somerset Sabres (2005 Twenty20 Cup winners)
- (England) Leicestershire Foxes (2004 Twenty20 Cup winners)
- (Sri Lanka) Chilaw Marians (2004 Twenty20 Challenge Trophy winners)
- (Pakistan) Faisalabad Wolves (2004–05 ABN-AMRO Twenty-20 Cup winners)
- (South Africa) Titans (2004–05 Standard Bank Pro20 Series winners)
- PCA Masters XI

== Squads ==
(England) Leicestershire Foxes

- HD Ackerman (c)
- Paul Nixon (wk)
- James Allenby
- Stuart Broad
- Ottis Gibson
- Aftab Habib
- Darren Maddy
- David Masters
- John Maunders
- Dinesh Mongia
- John Sadler
- Jeremy Snape
- Charl Willoughby

(Sri Lanka) Chilaw Marians

- Hasantha Fernando (c)
- Ishan Mutaliph (wk)
- Charith Sylvester (wk)
- Manoj Chanaka
- Kalidu Fernando
- Malintha Gajanayake
- Janaka Gunaratne
- Dinuka Hettiarachchi
- Praneth Jayasundera
- Arosha Perera
- Dammika Perera
- Chinthaka Perera
- Nimesh Perera
- Dinuk Sulakshana
- Mahela Udawatte
- Gayan Wijekoon
- Omesh Wijesiriwardene

(Pakistan) Faisalabad Wolves

- Naved Latif (c)
- Mohammed Salman (wk)
- Abdul Mannan
- Ahmed Hayat
- Asif Hussain
- Faisal Afridi
- Ijaz Ahmed junior
- Imran Ali
- Imran Khalid
- Khurram Shehzad
- Mohammad Hafeez
- Mohammad Saleem
- Saeed Ajmal
- Samiullah Khan
- Shahid Muzaffar
- Tauqeer Hussain

(South Africa) Titans

- Gerald Dros (c)
- Kruger van Wyk (wk)
- Maurice Aronstam
- Goolam Bodi
- Pierre de Bruyn
- Francois du Plessis
- Paul Harris
- Ethy Mbhalati
- Albie Morkel
- Morné Morkel
- Johannes Myburgh
- Alviro Petersen
- Aaron Phangiso
- Brendon Reddy
- Andre Seymore

PCA Masters XI

- Martyn Ball (c)
- Parthiv Patel (wk)
- Phil DeFreitas
- Rohan Gavaskar
- Chris Gayle
- Mark Hardinges
- Martin McCague
- Jon Lewis
- Nadeem Shahid
- Chris Schofield
- Robin Singh
- Craig Spearman
- Javagal Srinath

(England) Somerset Sabres

- Ian Blackwell (c)
- Carl Gazzard (wk)
- Sam Spurway (wk)
- Gareth Andrew
- Andy Caddick
- Wes Durston
- John Francis
- Simon Francis
- James Hildreth
- Keith Parsons
- Arul Suppiah
- Matthew Wood
- Robert Woodman

== Fixtures ==
=== Group stage ===
Group A

Team	Pld	W	L	NR	Pts
(England) Leicestershire Foxes	2	2	0	0	4
(Pakistan) Faisalabad Wolves	2	1	1	0	2
(England) Somerset Sabres	2	0	2	0	0

15 September 2005
14:00
Scorecard

Leicestershire Foxes (England)	v	(Pakistan) Faisalabad Wolves

Leicestershire Foxes won the bowl-out 5–3
Grace Road, Leicester
Umpires: John Holder and Nigel Llong

- Match abandoned without a ball bowled.

16 September 2005
10:30
Scorecard

Faisalabad Wolves (Pakistan); 207/5 (20 overs)	v	(England) Somerset Sabres; 177 (19.4 overs)
Mohammad Hafeez 79 (35); Gareth Andrew 2/45 (4 overs)		Ian Blackwell 82 (48); Mohammad Hafeez 3/23 (3.4 overs)

Faisalabad Wolves won by 30 runs
Grace Road, Leicester
Umpires: Trevor Jesty and Richard Kettleborough
Player of the match: Mohammad Hafeez (Faisalabad Wolves)

- Somerset won the toss and elected to field.

16 September 2005
17:30 (D/N)
Scorecard

Leicestershire Foxes (England); 172/6 (20 overs)	v	(England) Somerset Sabres; 106/8 (20 overs)
Darren Maddy 42 (27); Rob Woodman 2/37 (4 overs)		John Francis 49 (44); Dinesh Mongia 2/6 (4 overs)

Leicestershire Foxes won by 66 runs
Grace Road, Leicester
Umpires: John Holder and Trevor Jesty
Player of the match: Dinesh Mongia (Leicestershire Foxes)

- Leicestershire Foxes won the toss and elected to bat.

Group B

Team	Pld	W	L	NR	Pts
PCA Masters XI	2	2	0	0	4
(Sri Lanka) Chilaw Marians	2	1	1	0	2
(South Africa) Titans	2	0	2	0	0

15 September 2005
10:30
Scorecard

Chilaw Marians (Sri Lanka); 21/0 (2.1 overs)	v	PCA Masters XI
Charith Fernando 11* (10)

PCA Masters XI won the bowl-out 6–2
Grace Road, Leicester
Umpires: Nigel Cowley and Steve Garratt

- PCA Masters XI won the toss and elected to field.
- No result.

15 September 2005
17:30 (D/N)
Scorecard

PCA Masters XI	v	(South Africa) Titans

PCA Masters XI won the bowl-out 6-5
Grace Road, Leicester
Umpires: Nigel Cowley and John Holder

- Match abandoned without a ball bowled

16 September 2005
14:00
Scorecard

Chilaw Marians (Sri Lanka); 179 (19.1 overs)	v	(South Africa) Titans; 112 (18 overs)
Nimesh Perera 39 (18); Johann Myburgh 3/16 (3 overs)		Alviro Petersen 29 (24); Janaka Gunaratne 4/21 (4 overs)

Chilaw Marians won by 67 runs
Grace Road, Leicester
Umpires: Nigel Cowley and Nigel Llong

- Chilaw Marians won the toss and elected to bat.

=== Knockout stage ===
Semifinals
A1	(England) Leicestershire Foxes	103 (19.5 ov)
B2	(Sri Lanka) Chilaw Marians	112/9 (20 ov)
B1	PCA Masters XI	138/9 (20 ov)
A2	(Pakistan) Faisalabad Wolves	142/7 (20 ov)

Final
B2	(Sri Lanka) Chilaw Marians	132 (19.5 ov)
A2	(Pakistan) Faisalabad Wolves	133/5 (18.1 ov)

Semi-finals

17 September 2005
11:00
Scorecard

Chilaw Marians (Sri Lanka); 112/9 (20 overs)	v	(England) Leicestershire Foxes; 103 (19.5 overs)
Hasantha Fernando 38 (34); David Masters 3/7 (4 overs)		Paul Nixon 19 (28); Hasantha Fernando 3/22 (4 overs)

Chilaw Marians won by 9 runs
Grace Road, Leicester
Umpires: Richard Kettleborough and Nigel Llong
Player of the match: Hasantha Fernando (Chilaw Marians)

- Chilaw Marians won the toss and elected to bat.

17 September 2005
14:00
Scorecard

PCA Masters XI; 138/9 (20 overs)	v	(Pakistan) Faisalabad Wolves; 142/7 (20 overs)
Robin Singh 38 (31); Imran Khalid 2/15 (4 overs)		Naved Latif 36 (25); Chris Gayle 3/13 (4 overs)

Faisalabad Wolves won by 3 wickets
Grace Road, Leicester
Umpires: Nigel Cowley and Trevor Jesty
Player of the match: Mohammad Salman (Faisalabad Wolves)

- PCA Masters XI won the toss and elected to bat.

Final

17 September 2005
17:30 (D/N)
Scorecard

Chilaw Marians (Sri Lanka); 132 (19.5 overs)	v	(Pakistan) Faisalabad Wolves; 133/5 (18.1 overs)
Nimesh Perera 37 (33); Saeed Ajmal 2/25 (4 overs)		Naved Latif 45 (33); Nimesh Perera 3/21 (3.1 overs)

Faisalabad Wolves won by 5 wickets
Grace Road, Leicester
Umpires: John Holder and Richard Kettleborough
Player of the match: Naved Latif (Faisalabad Wolves)

- Chilaw Marians won the toss and elected to bat.

== See also ==
- Champions League Twenty20
- Faisalabad Wolves
