= Chris Benham =

English cricketer (born 1983)

Personal information
- Full name: Christopher Charles Benham
- Born: 24 March 1983 (age 43); Frimley, Surrey, England
- Nickname: Benny, Benoit, Benloy
- Height: 6 ft 2 in (1.88 m)
- Batting: Right-handed
- Bowling: Right arm off break

Domestic team information
- Years: Team
- 1999–2001: Hampshire Cricket Board
- 2004: Loughborough UCCE
- 2004–2010: Hampshire (squad no. 20)
- 2011: Unicorns
- 2011: Wiltshire

Career statistics
| Competition | FC | LA | T20 |
|---|---|---|---|
| Matches | 48 | 63 | 37 |
| Runs scored | 2,103 | 1,731 | 447 |
| Batting average | 27.31 | 35.32 | 15.96 |
| 100s/50s | 2/10 | 4/9 | 0/1 |
| Top score | 111 | 158 | 59 |
| Balls bowled | 30 | 1 | – |
| Wickets | 0 | 0 | – |
| Bowling average | – | – | – |
| 5 wickets in innings | – | – | – |
| 10 wickets in match | – | – | – |
| Best bowling | – | – | – |
| Catches/stumpings | 51/– | 26/– | 20/– |
- Source: Cricinfo, 14 July 2019

Christopher Charles Benham (born 24 March 1983) is an English former professional cricketer who was mostly associated with Hampshire in first-class, one-day, and Twenty20 cricket, for whom he made 136 appearances across all formats of the game from 2004 to 2010. He also played first-class cricket for Loughborough UCCE when he was a student, and one-day cricket for both the Hampshire Cricket Board and the ad hoc Unicorns cricket team. Playing as a right-handed batsman, he made two centuries in first-class cricket and four in one-day cricket. Following the end of his professional career, he briefly played minor counties cricket for Wiltshire in 2011, before embarking on a career as a financial planner.

== Life ==
=== Early life and cricket career ===
Benham was born on 24 March 1983 in Firmley, Surrey. He was educated just across the county border in Hampshire at Yateley School. A right-handed batsman, Benham began his association with Hampshire as a ten-year-old, when he joined Hampshire's academy system. He played his early club cricket for Cove. Benham made his debut in List A one-day cricket for the Hampshire Cricket Board (HCB) (Note: The Hampshire Cricket Board (HCB), formed in 1996, is the governing body for recreational cricket in the county of Hampshire. It entered a largely amateur team in the minor counties one-day Knockout Trophy between 1998 and 2002, and took part alongside the first-class and minor counties, and other cricket boards, in the List A domestic one-day competition between 1999 and 2003. The HCB is a separate entity to Hampshire County Cricket Club, which was formed in 1863, and is the professional representative team for the county of Hampshire.) against the Kent Cricket Board at Maidstone in the first round of the 2001 Cheltenham & Gloucester Trophy, with Benham opening the batting and being dismissed without scoring by Andy Tutt in a rain-affected match; prior to this match, he had previously played six matches for the HCB in the MCCA Knockout Trophy between 1999 and 2001. Alongside James Tomlinson, he was awarded a summer contract by Hampshire ahead of the 2002 season. Three years later, while attending Loughborough University, Benham made his debut in first-class cricket for Loughborough UCCE against Somerset at County Cricket Ground, Taunton; he featured in two further first-class matches for Loughborough in 2004, against Gloucestershire and Sussex. Later in the season, he debuted for Hampshire in the County Championship against Derbyshire, impressing with 74 runs in Hampshire's first innings. Following the 2004 season, he spent the winter in Australia on a scholarship, where he shared his accommodation with Alastair Cook and his Hampshire teammate Kevin Latouf.

=== Establishing himself at Hampshire ===
Having impressed in the Second Eleven at the beginning of the 2005 season, Benham was called up to replace the injured Simon Katich in Hampshire's Championship match against Warwickshire in May. He made five appearances in the 2005 County Championship, scoring 117 runs at an average of 11.70. He captained Hampshire in their opening first-class match of the 2006 season against Loughborough UCCE, and subsequently went onto make eight appearances in the County Championship, scoring 504 runs at an average of 33.60. He played his first one-day match for Hampshire in 2006, and would make eleven one-day appearances across the season. He had notable success in one-day cricket during the season, recording two centuries; the first (122 runs) came against West Indies A in August, while the second came in the Pro40 promotion/relegation match against Glamorgan in September, when he hit an unbeaten 158 runs from 130 balls to guide Hampshire to promotion to Division One of the 2007 Pro40. It was the highest score by a Hampshire batsman in one-day cricket in over a decade, and drew praise from captain Shane Warne. His one-day record in 2006 was 487 runs at an average of 54.11. He also debuted in Twenty20 cricket during the season, making eight appearances in the Twenty20 Cup. His form led to him being Hampshire's recipient of the NBC Denis Compton Award for 2006. At the end of the season, he signed a two-year contract extension at Hampshire, despite interest from Nottinghamshire.

Benham made nine appearances in the 2007 County Championship, scoring 312 runs at an average of 22.28. However, he lost his place in the team midway through May to accommodate Michael Carberry, who was returning from injury. In one-day cricket, he made twelve appearances in 2007, scoring 319 runs at an average of 26.58; his sole century that season came in the Pro40 against Gloucestershire, with his 111 runs from 105 balls helping Hampshire to a narrow victory by 14 runs. He also made seven appearances in the 2007 Twenty20 Cup. In 2008, he made eight appearances in the County Championship, scoring 374 runs at an average of 28.76. He was more effective in one-day cricket in 2008, making thirteen appearances and scoring 338 runs at an average of 33.80; though he did not make a century in one-day cricket, he made contributions at important juctures during the season. His unbeaten 54 against Gloucestershire in the Friends Provident Trophy in May guided Hampshire to their first win of the season, whilst against Durham in the Pro40, he scored 69 runs from 45 balls, contributing to Hampshire's victory by 62 runs. Benham featured in the 2008 Twenty20 Cup, but struggled for form in his eight matches, scoring just 40 runs.

=== Decline and release ===
Despite making a maiden first-class century (111 runs) against Loughborough UCCE early in the 2009 season, he failed to break into the Hampshire middle order and having not played a County Championship match since June, Benham was afforded an opportunity against Durham in September, when he replaced Dimitri Mascarenhas who was on international duty. He recorded his only first-class century for Hampshire during the match, making exactly 100 runs. In six first-class matches in 2009, Benham scored 316 runs at an average of 45.14. He played a larger part in Hampshire's one-day team in 2009, making eighteen appearances in which he scored 420 runs at an average of exactly 35. He made one century in one-day cricket in 2009, scoring an unbeaten 108 against Leicestershire. He later played in the Friends Provident Trophy final against Sussex at Lord's, where his unbeaten partnership of 67 runs with Nic Pothas was pivotal in taking Hampshire to victory. In Twenty20 matches, Benham had less success than he found in one-day cricket in 2009, scoring 129 runs at an average of 18.42 from the eleven matches in which he featured.

Benham was unable to establish himself in the Hampshire team during the 2010 season, in part due to the emergence of batsman James Vince. He made six appearances in the County Championship, scoring 268 runs at an average of 24.36. He did not feature for Hampshire in one-day cricket in 2010, whilst in the Friends Provident T20 he made just three appearances. In July, he was charged by the England and Wales Cricket Board for showing dissent over an umpire's decision. Benham was released by Hampshire following the 2010 season, but declared his intention to still play cricket at the highest level. In 45 first-class matches for Hampshire, he scored 1,975 runs at an average of 27.05. In one-day cricket, his 54 matches for Hampshire yielded him 1,564 runs at an average of 36.37, whilst in 37 Twenty20 matches he scored 447 runs at an average of 15.96.

=== Career after Hampshire ===
Benham was selected in the Unicorns squad to take part in the 2011 Clydesdale Bank 40. The Unicorns were an ad hoc team made up of players without contracts with one of the eighteen first-class counties. Benham made three appearances in the competition, with his top-score for the Unicorns (58 runs) being made in a defeat to Essex. In May 2011, he was offered a trial by injury–hit Nottinghamshire, and later in the season he played minor counties cricket for Wiltshire, making four appearances in the Minor Counties Championship and one appearance in the MCCA Knockout Trophy. He later played club cricket for Wimbledon in the Surrey Championship in 2013, with Benham being appointed their captain in 2014. Following his cricket career, Benham began a career as a financial planner at St James's Place Wealth Management.
