= Simon Francis (cricketer) =

English cricketer

Personal information
- Full name: Simon Richard George Francis
- Born: 15 August 1978 (age 48); Bromley, London, England
- Nickname: Franco, Guru
- Height: 6 ft 1 in (1.85 m)
- Batting: Right-handed
- Bowling: Right arm fast-medium
- Relatives: John Francis (brother)

Domestic team information
- Years: Team
- 1997–2001: Hampshire (squad no. 5)
- 2002–2006: Somerset (squad no. 18)
- 2007: Nottinghamshire

Career statistics
Competition	FC	LA	T20
Matches	60	70	22
Runs scored	509	240	39
Batting average	11.56	12.63	7.80
100s/50s	0/0	0/0	0/0
Top score	44	33*	9*
Balls bowled	8,583	2,929	384
Wickets	136	77	11
Bowling average	41.13	34.33	57.09
5 wickets in innings	3	1	0
10 wickets in match	0	0	0
Best bowling	5/42	8/66	2/22
Catches/stumpings	19/–	16/–	4/–
- Source: Cricinfo, 5 July 2023

Simon Richard George Francis (born 15 August 1978) is an English former cricketer. Francis played county cricket at first-class level as a right-arm fast-medium bowler for Hampshire, Somerset, and Nottinghamshire in a career that spanned from 1997 to 2007. While playing for Somerset in 2004, he took figures of 8 for 66 in a one-day match against Derbyshire, establishing the best individual bowling figures taking by a Somerset player in one-day cricket. This record remains as of 2026. After the end of his playing career, Francis became the director of cricket at Warwick School.

== Early life ==
Francis was born at Bromley in Kent in August 1978. He was educated firstly at Yardley Court preparatory school in Tonbridge, and after his parents relocated to Southampton he attended King Edward VI School. From there, he matriculated to Durham University. He played field hockey at Under-18 level for England. In youth level cricket, Francis played at Under-17 and Under-19 level for England, making a Youth One Day International for England Under-19 against Pakistan Under-19 in January 1997. From a young age, he had been a member of Hampshire's youth system.

== Cricket ==
=== Early career at Hampshire ===
In the 1997 season, Francis made his senior debut for Hampshire in a List A one-day match against Sussex in the Axa Life League, and following this he made his first-class debut against Worcestershire at Southampton in the County Championship. While studying at Durham University, he played two first-class matches for the British Universities cricket team against the touring Sri Lankans and South Africans in 1998, and one first-class match against the touring New Zealanders in 1999. Two years after he had last played for Hampshire's first eleven, Francis returned to the team in July 1999 for their County Championship match against Lancashire. He made two further Championship appearances in 1999, alongside four one-day appearances in the CGU National League; following the conclusion of the 1999 season, he toured South Africa with the British Universities, at which point he was studying at the Bournemouth University. In 2000, he made nine first-class appearances, seven of which came in the County Championship. In these, he took 15 wicket at an average of 40.13. He also made seven one-day appearances in the 2000 season, taking just one wicket. He did not play for the first eleven during the 2001 season, and having been beset with injuries over the previous two seasons, was subsequently released at the end of the 2001 season alongside Zac Morris, Andrew Sexton, and John Stephenson.

=== Move to Somerset ===
Shortly after his release by Hampshire, Francis signed for Somerset. He made his debut for Somerset in the 2002 County Championship against Yorkshire, with Francis making ten Championship appearances during the season. He took 28 first-class wickets at an average of 33.82 in 2002, taking his first five wicket haul (5 for 73) against Warwickshire. In one-day cricket in 2002, he made fourteen one-day appearances, taking 15 wickets at an average of 39.86. In the semi-final of the 2002 Cheltenham & Gloucester Trophy against Kent, Francis appeared as a substitute fielder for Richard Johnson, affording the pivitol run out of James Golding to help Somerset advance to the final by five runs. He made ten further first-class appearances in 2003, nine of which came in the County Championship. In these, he took 35 wickets at an average of 33.68. From nine one-day appearances in 2003, he took 12 wickets at an average of 41.08. In June 2003, he featured in Somerset's first-ever Twenty20 match, played against Warwickshire at Taunton in the Twenty20 Cup; he played five matches in the competition, taking 4 wickets. In January 2004, Francis was named in the England A team for their tour of India and Malaysia. He made two first-class against and three one-day appearances on the tour.

Francis made eleven appearances in the 2004 County Championship, taking 33 wickets at an average of 36.39; he took two five wicket hauls, claiming career-best figures of 5 for 42 against Glamorgan. In fifteen one-day appearances in 2004, he took 24 wickets at an average of 25.08; against Derbyshire in the 2nd Round of the Cheltenham & Gloucester Trophy, he took figures of 8 for 66, which as of 2026 remains the best individual one-day figures by a Somerset bowler. In the 2004 Twenty20 Cup, his five appearances yielded him just a single wicket. He made only six appearances in the 2005 County Championship, but sturggled with the ball with 5 wickets at an average of exactly 104. In limited-overs cricket in 2005, he made fourteen one-day appearances, taking 19 wickets at an average of 28.57, whilst his nine appearances across the Twenty20 Cup and the International 20:20 Club Championship yielded him 5 wickets at an average of 49.60. He found his County Championship opportunities limited in 2006, making three appearances. In limited-overs cricket in 2006, he made a single one-day appearance against Yorkshire in the Pro 40 and played once in the Twenty20 Cup against Worcestershire. He was released by Somerset at the end of the season.

=== Season at Nottinghamshire ===
With Ryan Sidebottom being called up to England's Test squad at the start of the 2007 season, Nottinghamshire required a bowler to cover his international duty. He was signed by Nottinghamshire in May 2007, and played in two County Championship matches, though both were heavily affected by rain. He also made two appearances in the 2007 Twenty20 Cup, both against Yorkshire. He left Nottinghamshire at the end of the season, having not been offered an extension to his contract.

=== Playing style and statistics ===
Francis was a right-arm fast-medium bowler, capable of bowling at a brisk pace. He made 60 first-class appearances in his career, taking 136 wickets at an average of 41.13. In 70 one-day appearances, he took 77 wickets at an average of 34.33, whilst in 22 T20 appearances he took 11 wickets at an average of 57.09. A tailend batsman, Francis had a highest first-class score of 44 runs.

== Personal life ==
His younger brother, John, also played first-class cricket for Hampshire and Somerset. Following the end of his playing career, Francis became the director of cricket at Warwick School. It was teaching at Warwick where he met his wife, Becky. The couple married in December 2009 at St Alphege Church, Solihull.
