= John Francis (English cricketer) =

English cricketer (born 1980)

Personal information
- Full name: John Daniel Francis
- Born: 13 November 1980 (age 45); Bromley, Kent, England
- Height: 5 ft 11 in (1.80 m)
- Batting: Left-handed
- Bowling: Slow left arm orthodox
- Relatives: Simon Francis (brother)

Domestic team information
- Years: Team
- 2001–2003: Hampshire (squad no. 6)
- 2003: Loughborough UCCE
- 2004–2008: Somerset

Career statistics
| Competition | FC | LA | T20 |
|---|---|---|---|
| Matches | 57 | 70 | 14 |
| Runs scored | 2,748 | 1,827 | 271 |
| Batting average | 29.54 | 33.83 | 27.10 |
| 100s/50s | 6/15 | 1/12 | –/– |
| Top score | 125* | 103* | 49 |
| Balls bowled | 273 | 0 | 0 |
| Wickets | 4 | – | – |
| Bowling average | 41.00 | – | – |
| 5 wickets in innings | – | – | – |
| 10 wickets in match | – | – | – |
| Best bowling | 1/1 | – | – |
| Catches/stumpings | 32/– | 17/– | 1/– |
- Source: Cricinfo, 2 February 2010

John Daniel Francis (born 13 November 1980) is an English former first-class cricketer who played county cricket at first-class level for Hampshire and Somerset as a batsman in a career spanning from 2001 to 2008.

== Cricket career ==
=== Beginnings at Hampshire ===
Francis was born at Bromley in Kent in November 1980. He grew up in Southampton, where he was educated at King Edward VI School. From there, he attended Durham University, followed by Loughborough University. Francis made his debut in first-class cricket for Hampshire against Middlesex at Southampton in the 2001 County Championship, with him making a second appearance that against Nottinghamshire at Trent Bridge. In that same season, he also made his debut in List A one-day cricket, making six appearances in the 2001 Norwich Union League, in which he scored 189 runs at an average of exactly 63. The following season, he was selected to play for the British Universities cricket team in a first-class match against the touring Sri Lankans, in addition to making eight appearances in the 2002 County Championship for Hampshire, alongside ten one-day appearances 2002 Norwich Union League; against Northamptonshire, he made what would be his only one-day century with a score of 103 not out. Alongside James Adams and Chris Benham, he was one of three Loughborough University cricketers in Hampshire's 2002 squad.

Loughborough University's representative team, Loughborough UCCE, were awarded first-class status for the 2003 season, with Francis playing in their inaugural first-class fixture against Somerset. He played in all three of their first-class fixtures that season, in addition to playing for the British Universities against the touring Zimbabweans. Following his appearances for Loughborough, Francis made six appearances in the 2003 County Championship, alongside eleven one-day appearances in the National League. He was offered a two-year contract extension by Hampshire at the end of the 2003 season, but declined, departing at the end of the season alongside Iain Brunnschweiler and Alex Morris. In seventeen first-class matches for Hampshire, he scored 700 runs at an average of 24.13, making five half centuries. In 27 one-day appearances, he scored 818 runs at an average of 40.90, making six half centuries alongside his lone century.

=== Move to Somerset ===
In November 2003, Francis signed a three-year contract with Somerset, where his brother, Simon, also played. Upon signing for Somerset, Francis believed the move would boost his chances of playing internationally for England. During his first season at Somerset, he made ten first-class appearances, including eight in the County Championship; he scored his maiden first-class century during the season, with 109 runs against Yorkshire; later in the season he made a second century with 110 runs against Hampshire. In addition to his fourteen one-day matches in 2004, Francis also made his Twenty20 debut against Warwickshire in the 2004 Twenty20 Cup. Francis had his most prolific first-class season in 2005, passing 1,000 runs for the season at an average of 40.84, and making his highest first-class score with an unbeaten 125 against Yorkshire at Leeds. In one-day cricket in 2005, Francis made twenty appearances, scoring 493 runs at an average of exactly 29.

Despite his good form in 2005, Francis only featured in five first-class matches in 2006, alongside four one-day appearances and a lone Twenty20 appearance. He played four Twenty20 matches in the 2007 Twenty20 Cup, bring his total for Somerset to fourteen matches in that format, in which he scored 271 runs at an average of 27.10, with a highest score of 49. In 2007, he made just one first-class appearance against Loughborough UCCE, and did not feature for Somerset one-day cricket. The following season, he made two first-class and five one-day appearances. These bought his total first-class and one-day appearances for Somerset to 35 and 43 respectively. In first-class cricket for Somerset, he scored 1,857 runs at an average of 33.76; he made six centuries and nine half centuries. In one-day cricket, he scored 1,009 runs at an average of 29.67, making six half centuries with a highest score of 79. Francis retired from professional at the end of the 2008 season, citing a lack of opportunities at Somerset in his final three seasons as motivation for his decision to retire.

Following his retirement, Francis went into business with the brother of Wes Durston, his former teammate at Somerset, running a marquee business in the South West of England. He continued to play club cricket for Taunton St Andrews following his retirement from the professional game.
