= 2005 Twenty20 Cup =

- Dates: 22 June 2005 – 30 July 2005
- Administrator: England and Wales Cricket Board
- Cricket format: Twenty20
- Tournament format(s): Group stage and knockout
- Champions: Somerset Sabres (1st title)
- Participants: 18
- Matches: 79
- Most runs: Owais Shah (410 for Middlesex)
- Most wickets: Nayan Doshi (17 for Surrey)

The 2005 Twenty20 Cup was the third edition of what would later become the T20 Blast, England's premier domestic Twenty20 competition. The finals day took place on 30 July at The Oval, and was won by the Somerset Sabres.

== Fixtures and results ==
=== Group stage ===
==== Midlands/Wales/West Division ====
Team	Pld	W	L	T	N/R	Pts	Net R/R
Northamptonshire Steelbacks	8	4	2	0	2	10	+1.174
Warwickshire Bears	8	4	3	0	1	9	+0.791
Somerset Sabres	8	4	3	0	1	9	+1.088
Gloucestershire Gladiators	8	3	3	0	2	8	−1.442
Worcestershire Royals	8	3	4	0	1	7	−0.464
Glamorgan Dragons	8	2	5	0	1	5	−1.090

==== North Division ====
Team	Pld	W	L	T	N/R	Pts	Net R/R
Lancashire Lightning	8	6	1	0	1	13	+1.773
Leicestershire Foxes	8	5	2	0	1	11	+0.255
Derbyshire Phantoms	8	4	3	0	1	9	−0.452
Yorkshire Phoenix	8	3	5	0	0	6	−0.708
Durham Dynamos	8	2	5	0	1	5	−0.872
Nottinghamshire Outlaws	8	2	6	0	0	4	+0.138

==== South Division ====
Team	Pld	W	L	T	N/R	Pts	Net R/R
Surrey Lions	8	5	3	0	0	10	+0.641
Middlesex Crusaders	8	4	3	0	1	9	+0.164
Sussex Sharks	8	3	2	0	3	9	+0.136
Hampshire Hawks	8	3	2	0	3	9	+0.203
Essex Eagles	8	3	3	0	2	8	−0.067
Kent Spitfires	8	1	6	0	1	3	−1.021

=== Quarter-finals ===
18 July 2005

Lancashire Lightning; 189/7 (20 overs)	v	Derbyshire Phantoms; 172 (19.3 overs)
Mal Loye 73 (32); Tom Lungley 2/29 (3 overs)		Michael Di Venuto 41 (25); Gary Keedy 3/26 (4 overs)

Lancashire won by 17 runs
Old Trafford, Manchester
Umpires: Peter Hartley and Neil Mallender
Player of the match: Andrew Symonds (Lancs)

18 July 2005

Leicestershire Foxes; 159/6 (20 overs)	v	Middlesex Crusaders; 140/7 (20 overs)
Darren Maddy 36 (33); Chris Peploe 2/17 (4 overs)		Scott Styris 73 (55); Charl Willoughby 3/11 (4 overs)

Leicestershire won by 19 runs
Grace Road, Leicester
Umpires: Trevor Jesty and Alan Whitehead
Player of the match: Charl Willoughby (Leics)

18 July 2005

Northamptonshire Steelbacks; 154/8 (20.0 overs)	v	Somerset Sabres; 155/6 (19.5 overs)
Usman Afzaal 35 (23); Ian Blackwell 3/16 (4 overs)		Matthew Wood 58 (53); Bilal Shafayat 2/13 (2 overs)

Somerset won by 4 wickets
County Ground, Northampton
Umpires: Jeff Evans and John Holder
Player of the match: Matthew Wood (Soms)

18 July 2005

Surrey Brown Caps; 149/8 (20 overs)	v	Warwickshire Bears; 117/8 (15 overs)
Mark Ramprakash 34 (34); Jonathan Trott 2/19 (2 overs)		Jim Troughton 21 (18); Rikki Clarke 2/20 (3 overs)

Surrey won on bowl out
The Oval, London
Umpires: David Constant and Allan Jones
Player of the match: Tim Murtagh (Surrey)

- Warwickshire target was 118 runs in 15 overs

=== Finals Day ===
==== Semi-finals ====
30 July 2005

Lancashire Lightning; 217/4 (20 overs)	v	Surrey Brown Caps; 195/7 (20 overs)
Andrew Symonds 52* (30); Nayan Doshi 2/35 (4 overs)		Ali Brown 51 (32); Andrew Symonds 1/21 (2 overs)

Lancashire won by 22 runs
The Oval, London
Umpires: Ian Gould and George Sharp
Player of the match: Andrew Flintoff (Lancs)

30 July 2005

Somerset Sabres; 157/9 (20 overs)	v	Leicestershire Foxes; 153/8 (20 overs)
Matthew Wood 38 (31); Dinesh Mongia 3/30 (4 overs)		Darren Maddy 56 (39); Richard Johnson 3/21 (3 overs)

Somerset won by 4 runs
The Oval, London
Umpires: John Holder and Peter Willey
Player of the match: Carl Gazzard (Soms)

==== Final ====
30 July 2005

Lancashire Lightning; 114/8 (16 overs)	v	Somerset Sabres; 118/3 (14.1 overs)
Stuart Law 59 (45); Richard Johnson 3/26 (3 overs)		Graeme Smith 64* (47); Andrew Flintoff 2/33 (4 overs)

Somerset Sabres won by 7 wickets
The Oval, London
Umpires: Ian Gould and Peter Willey
Player of the match: Graeme Smith (Soms)

- Match was reduced before play to 16 overs-a-side

== See also ==
- Twenty20 Cup
