= 2007 NatWest Pro40 =

- Administrator(s): England and Wales Cricket Board
- Cricket format: Limited overs cricket (40 overs per innings)
- Tournament format(s): League system
- Champions: Worcestershire Royals (4th title)
- Participants: 18
- Matches: 72
- Most runs: 409 Phil Mustard
- Most wickets: 21 Tim Murtagh

The 2007 NatWest Pro 40 league season was a 40 over English county cricket competition; colloquially known as the Sunday League. Worcestershire Royals won the League for the fourth time.

== Final standings ==
=== Division One ===
Team	P	W	L	T	NR	Pts
1. Worcestershire Royals	8	6	1	0	1	13
2. Nottinghamshire Outlaws	8	4	2	0	2	10
3. Lancashire Lightning	8	3	1	0	4	10
4. Hampshire Hawks	8	4	3	0	1	9
5. Sussex Sharks	8	3	3	0	2	8
6. Gloucestershire Gladiators	8	2	4	0	2	6
7. Northamptonshire Steelbacks	8	2	4	1	1	6
8. Warwickshire Bears	8	2	5	0	1	5
9. Essex Eagles	8	1	4	1	2	5

= Champions
= Relegated

=== Division two ===
Team	P	W	L	T	NR	Pts
1. Durham Dynamos	8	6	2	0	0	12
2. Somerset Sabres	8	5	2	0	1	11
3. Middlesex Crusaders	8	5	3	0	0	10
4. Surrey Brown Caps	8	5	3	0	0	10
5. Kent Spitfires	8	5	3	0	0	10
6. Yorkshire Phoenix	8	4	3	0	1	9
7. Leicestershire Foxes	8	3	4	0	1	7
8. Derbyshire Phantoms	8	1	7	0	0	2
9. Glamorgan Dragons	8	0	7	0	1	1

= Promoted
