= Maurice Aronstam =

South African cricketer (born 1980)

Maurice Albert Aronstam (born 21 December 1980 in Pretoria) is a South African first class cricketer for Northerns. An allrounder, he is a right-handed opening batsman and legbreak bowler. He has a highest score of 201 not out and best bowling figures of 5 for 10.
