= Nimesh Perera =

Sri Lankan cricketer (born 1977)

Modara Muthugalage Don Nimesh Randika Gayan Perera (born September 5, 1977, in Colombo) is a Sri Lankan first-class cricketer. A genuine all-rounder, Perera is an aggressive left-handed middle to lower order batsman and a leg spin bowler.

After making his first-class debut in 1995/96, Perera captained the Sri Lankan Under-19 side in a three-Test series against India the following season. He toured England with the Sri Lankan A team in 1999. The tour began against an ECB XI, and he made 110 not out and took 4/25. He made his Twenty20 debut on 17 August 2004, for Chilaw Marians Cricket Club in the 2004 SLC Twenty20 Tournament.

== See also ==
- List of Chilaw Marians Cricket Club players
