= Carl Gazzard =

English cricketer

Personal information
- Full name: Carl Matthew Gazzard
- Born: 15 April 1982 (age 44); Penzance, Cornwall
- Height: 6 ft 0 in (1.83 m)
- Batting: Right-handed
- Role: Wicket-keeper

Domestic team information
- Years: Team
- 2002–2009: Somerset
- FC debut: 24 July 2002 Somerset v West Indies A
- Last FC: 9 September 2008 Somerset v Durham
- LA debut: 4 May 1999 Cornwall v Cumberland
- Last LA: 14 May 2009 Somerset v Warwickshire

Career statistics
| Competition | FC | LA | T20 |
|---|---|---|---|
| Matches | 28 | 54 | 27 |
| Runs scored | 738 | 954 | 221 |
| Batting average | 19.94 | 23.85 | 17.00 |
| 100s/50s | 0/1 | 1/4 | 0/0 |
| Top score | 74 | 157 | 39 |
| Catches/stumpings | 58/1 | 51/7 | 14/6 |
- Source: Cricinfo, 4 August 2009

Carl Gazzard (born 15 April 1982) is an English former cricketer who played for Somerset. He was a right-handed batsman and wicket-keeper.

He made his debut for Cornwall in 1998 and was their regular wicket-keeper in 1998 and 1999. He also made his debut for Somerset 2nd XI in 1998, his first-class debut in 2002 and his Championship debut in 2003.

He became the regular wicket-keeper late in 2005 after the retirement of Robert Turner and was in the 2005 Twenty20 winning side as Somerset beat Lancashire at the Brit Oval, in the match he took two catches and a run out. In the semi-final against Leicestershire, Gazzard impressed with his excellent glovework making two key stumpings and a run out, also he hit 16 off the penultimate over therefore receiving the man of the match award. A poor start to the 2006 season in which he scored only 305 first-class runs at 15.25 in thirteen matches led to him being dropped from the Somerset first team for Sam Spurway to take his place.

In September 2009 Carl Gazzard retired from professional cricket at the age of 27 to pursue a career in finance. This was mainly due to a lack of first team opportunities due to the rise to prominence of Craig Kieswetter.

His grandfather, Gerry Gazzard, was a footballer who played 126 games for West Ham United from 1949–50 to 1953–54.
