= Sam Spurway =

English cricketer

Personal information
- Full name: Samuel Harold Patrick Spurway
- Born: 13 March 1987 (age 39); Taunton, Somerset, England
- Height: 6 ft 1 in (1.85 m)
- Batting: Left-handed
- Role: Wicket-keeper

Domestic team information
- Years: Team
- 2005–2007: Somerset

Career statistics
| Competition | FC | LA | T20 |
|---|---|---|---|
| Matches | 6 | 4 | 1 |
| Runs scored | 210 | 31 | 15 |
| Batting average | 30.00 | 15.50 | – |
| 100s/50s | 0/1 | 0/0 | 0/0 |
| Top score | 83 | 31 | 15* |
| Catches/stumpings | 16/0 | 4/2 | 0/0 |
- Source: CricketArchive, 3 August 2011

Samuel Harold Patrick Spurway (born 13 March 1987) is an English cricketer. He is a left-handed batsman and wicket-keeper who played for Somerset before he was released in 2007. He was born in Taunton.

Spurway started his career with Twenty20 cricket in 2005, following two years in the Second XI, before playing his debut first-class game in August 2006. In his first game, Spurway scored 46 runs before being caught out, in an innings victory for Somerset. He continued to play well for the team in a lower-order position, despite Somerset finishing 2006 dead last in Division Two of the County Championship.

Spurway remained in the team for the start of the 2007 season, as the team were enjoying a current upturn in their fortunes. The lower-order batsman, who was the preferred wicket-keeper over team-mate Carl Gazzard, continued to pull in impressive performances in the lower-order, none more so than when he was halted in the middle of a run towards his first half-century on 44* in a record-setting Somerset innings of 850-7 declared in April 2007. However, Craig Kieswetter became Somerset's first-choice wicketkeeper after some impressive performances in the one-day side. The club now maintains a policy to have only two wicketkeepers in their squad, which meant that Kieswetter and Gazzard were retained, at the expense of Spurway. Spurway now plays his cricket for boyhood club, Chard CC and is Director of Cube.
