= Robert Woodman =

English cricketer (born 1986)

Personal information
- Full name: Robert James Woodman
- Born: 12 October 1986 (age 40); Taunton, Somerset, England
- Batting: Left-handed
- Bowling: Left-arm fast-medium
- Role: All-rounder

Domestic team information
- Years: Team
- 2005: Somerset
- 2008–2009: Gloucestershire

Career statistics
Competition	FC	LA	T20
Matches	10	5	2
Runs scored	213	14	1
Batting average	15.21	14.00	–
100s/50s	0/0	0/0	0/0
Top score	46*	14	1*
Balls bowled	495	150	42
Wickets	7	1	2
Bowling average	48.71	163.00	31.50
5 wickets in innings	0	0	0
10 wickets in match	0	0	0
Best bowling	4/65	1/38	2/37
Catches/stumpings	3/–	2/–	0/–
- Source: CricketArchive, 22 December 2015

Robert James Woodman (born 12 October 1986) is an English former professional cricketer who played for Somerset and Gloucestershire. He played as a left-handed batsman and left-arm fast-medium bowler.

As of April 2021, he is the head of cricket at King’s College, Taunton.
