= Robert Turner (cricketer, born 1967) =

English cricketer

Personal information
- Full name: Robert Julian Turner
- Born: 25 November 1967 (age 58); Malvern, Worcestershire, England
- Height: 6 ft 1 in (185 cm)
- Batting: Right-handed
- Role: Wicket-keeper

Domestic team information
- Years: Team
- 1988–1991: Cambridge University (squad no. 5)
- 1990: Cambridgeshire
- 1992–2005: Somerset

Career statistics
| Competition | FC | LA | T20 |
|---|---|---|---|
| Matches | 250 | 236 | 6 |
| Runs scored | 9,519 | 3,439 | 25 |
| Batting average | 30.70 | 26.25 | 5.00 |
| 100s/50s | 10/46 | 0/9 | 0/0 |
| Top score | 144 | 70 | 11 |
| Catches/stumpings | 703/50 | 242/35 | 3/0 |
- Source: Cricinfo, 20 February 2011

Robert Julian Turner (born 25 November 1967) is an English former first-class cricketer. A right-handed wicket-keeper-batsman, Turner started his career in 1988 with Cambridge University, whom he captained. He began playing for Somerset County Cricket Club in 1991 and was their first-choice wicket-keeper until his retirement in 2005. He took 753 first-class dismissals in his 250-game career. Turner scored over 1,000 runs in both 1997 and 1999.

Born at Malvern in 1967, Turner was educated at Millfield School before going up to Magdalene College, Cambridge.
