= 2006 NatWest Pro 40 =

- Administrator(s): England and Wales Cricket Board
- Cricket format: Limited overs cricket (40 overs per innings)
- Tournament format(s): League system
- Champions: Essex Eagles (5th title)
- Participants: 18
- Matches: 72
- Most runs: 360 Owais Shah
- Most wickets: 19 Nayan Doshi

The 2006 NatWest Pro 40 league season was a 40 over English county cricket competition; colloquially known as the Sunday League. Essex Eagles won the League for the fifth time.

== Final standings ==
=== Division One ===
Team	P	W	L	T	NR	Pts	RunRate
1. Essex Eagles	8	5	2	0	1	11	1.23
2. Northamptonshire Steelbacks	8	5	2	0	1	11	-0.04
3. Sussex Sharks	8	5	3	0	0	10	0.14
4. Nottinghamshire Outlaws	8	4	3	0	1	9	0.07
5. Warwickshire Bears	8	3	4	0	1	7	-0.17
6. Lancashire Lightning	8	2	3	0	3	7	0.41
7. Glamorgan Dragons	8	2	3	1	2	7	-0.48
8. Durham Dynamos	8	2	4	1	1	6	-0.31
9. Middlesex Crusaders	8	2	6	0	0	4	-0.78

= Champions
= Relegated

=== Division two ===
Team	P	W	L	T	NR	Pts	RunRate
1. Gloucestershire Gladiators	8	6	2	0	0	12	0.28
2. Worcestershire Royals	8	6	2	0	0	12	1.03
3. Hampshire Hawks	8	5	2	0	1	11	0.55
4. Surrey Brown Caps	8	5	2	0	1	11	0.33
5. Kent Spitfires	8	5	3	0	0	10	0.78
6. Leicestershire Foxes	8	3	5	0	0	6	0.11
7. Somerset Sabres	8	2	6	0	0	4	-0.84
8. Derbyshire Phantoms	8	1	6	0	1	3	-0.86
9. Yorkshire Phoenix	8	1	6	0	1	3	-1.46

= Promoted
