= 2004 County Championship =

English cricket tournament

- Dates: 16 April – 19 September 2004
- Administrator: England and Wales Cricket Board
- Cricket format: First-class cricket (4 days)
- Tournament format: League system
- Champions: Warwickshire (6th title)
- Participants: 18
- Matches: 144
- Most runs: Brad Hodge (1,548 for Leicestershire)
- Most wickets: Mushtaq Ahmed (82 for Sussex)

The 2004 County Championship season, known as the Frizzell County Championship for sponsorship reasons, was contested through two divisions: Division One and Division Two. Each team plays all the others in their division both home and away. The top three teams from Division Two were promoted to the first division for 2005, while the bottom three teams from Division 1 are relegated.

== Teams ==
Teams in the County Championship 2004:

Division One	Division Two
Gloucestershire	Derbyshire
Kent	Durham
Lancashire	Essex
Middlesex	Glamorgan
Northamptonshire	Hampshire
Surrey	Leicestershire
Sussex	Nottinghamshire
Warwickshire	Somerset
Worcestershire	Yorkshire

Icon
Team promoted from Division Two
Team relegated from Division One

== Points system ==
- 14 points for a win
- 6 points for a tie
- 4 points for a draw
- 4 points for an abandoned game
- A maximum of 5 batting bonus points and 3 bowling bonus points

== Standings ==
=== Division One ===
	Team	P	W	L	D	Bat	Bowl	Ded	Pts
1	Warwickshire	16	5	0	11	65	43	0	222
2	Kent	16	7	3	6	43	41	0	206
3	Surrey	16	5	5	6	60	42	0.5	195.5
4	Middlesex	16	4	4	8	48	43	0	179
5	Sussex	16	4	5	7	46	42	0	172
6	Gloucestershire	16	3	3	10	49	41	0	172
7	Worcestershire	16	3	6	7	51	40	0	161
8	Lancashire	16	2	4	10	44	44	2	154
9	Northamptonshire	16	1	4	11	35	41	0	134

= Champions
= Relegated

=== Division Two ===
	Team	P	W	L	D	Bat	Bowl	Ded	Pts
1	Nottinghamshire	16	9	2	5	66	40	0	252
2	Hampshire	16	9	2	5	42	40	0	228
3	Glamorgan	16	5	2	9	48	44	1.5	196.5
4	Somerset	16	4	5	7	47	44	0	175
5	Essex	16	3	6	7	50	45	0	165
6	Leicestershire	16	4	5	7	39	42	1.5	163.5
7	Yorkshire	16	3	4	9	44	40	0	162
8	Derbyshire	16	1	6	9	36	40	0	126
9	Durham	16	2	8	6	28	41	2.5	118

= Champions
= Promoted

== Results summary ==
=== Division One ===
	Gloucestershire	Kent	Lancashire	Middlesex	Northamptonshire	Surrey	Sussex	Warwickshire	Worcestershire
Gloucestershire		16–19 Apr; Kent; 7 wickets	21-24 Jul; Match drawn	9-12 Jun; Gloucs; 10 wickets	12–15 May; Match drawn	2-4 Jun; Gloucs; 6 wickets	9-12 Sep; Match drawn	19-22 Aug; Match drawn	28-31 Jul; Worcs; 5 wickets
Kent	7–10 May; Match drawn		2-5 Jun; Kent; 7 wickets	16-18 Sep; Kent inns & 49 runs	3-6 Sep; Kent; 194 runs	18-21 Aug; Match drawn	3-6 Aug; Kent; 236 runs	23-26 Jun; Match drawn	21-24 Apr; Kent; 5 wickets
Lancashire	16-19 Sep; Match drawn	24-27 Aug; Match drawn		25–28 May; Match drawn	26–29 Jun; Match drawn	2-4 Sep; Surrey; 147 runs	9-11 Jun; Sussex; 8 wickets	28-31 Jul; Match drawn	12–14 May; Lancashire; 219 runs
Middlesex	3-6 Aug; Match drawn	28-31 Jul; Middlesex; 119 runs	7–10 May; Match drawn		9-12 Sep; Match drawn	21-24 Apr; Middlesex; 6 wickets	10-13 Aug; Sussex; 143 runs	2-5 Jun; Warwicks inns & 8 runs	18–21 Jun; Match drawn
Northamptonshire	24-27 Aug; Match drawn	19–22 May; Kent; 145 runs	16-19 Apr; Match drawn	18–21 Aug; Match drawn		29 Jul - 1 Aug; Northamptonshire; 6 wickets	7–10 May; Match drawn	16-19 Sep; Match drawn	2-5 Jun; Worcestershire; 9 wickets
Surrey	18-21 Jun; Match drawn	25–28 May; Surrey; 7 wickets	11-13 Aug; Surrey inns & 55 runs	19–22 May; Match drawn	28 Apr - 1 May; Match drawn		16-19 Apr; Match drawn	21-24 Jul; Warwickshire; 7 wickets	3-6 Aug; Surrey; 68 runs
Sussex	23-25 Jun; Gloucs; 9 wickets	23-26 Jul; Sussex inns & 45 runs	21–23 Apr; Lancashire; 10 wickets	4-6 Sep; Middlesex; 5 wickets	25–28 May; Match drawn	16-19 Sep; Surrey; 37 runs		19–22 May; Match drawn	19-22 Aug; Sussex; 7 wickets
Warwickshire	28 Apr – 1 May; Match drawn	11-14 Aug; Match drawn	18–21 Jun; Match drawn	16-19 Apr; Match drawn	9-12 Jun; Warwicks; 8 wickets	12–15 May; Warwicks; 7 wickets	24-27 Aug; Match drawn		25–27 May; Warwickshire; 9 wickets
Worcestershire	18–21 May; Worcesters inns & 86 runs	9-12 Jun; Match drawn	9-12 Sep; Match drawn	22-25 Jul; Middlesex; 6 wickets	11-14 Aug; Match drawn	23–26 Jun; Match drawn	28 Apr – 1 May; Match drawn	31 Aug – 3 Sep; Match drawn	

Home team won	Visiting team won	Match drawn

== Records ==
Most runs
Aggregate	Average	Player	County
1,548	61.92	Brad Hodge	Leicestershire
1,498	71.33	Ian Bell	Warwickshire
1,451	60.45	Mark Ramprakash	Surrey
1,424	56.96	Craig Spearman	Gloucestershire
1,411	52.25	Will Jefferson	Essex
1,365	59.34	Usman Afzaal	Northamptonshire
1,349	56.20	Graeme Hick	Worcestershire
1,280	53.33	Owais Shah	Middlesex
1,274	79.62	Rob Key	Kent
1,269	50.76	Ed Smith	Kent

Most wickets
Aggregate	Average	Player	County
82	27.14	Mushtaq Ahmed	Sussex
72	25.68	Gary Keedy	Lancashire
63	25.53	Danish Kaneria	Essex
60	24.08	Otis Gibson	Leicestershire
60	26.51	Johann Louw	Northamptonshire
57	25.26	Jon Lewis	Gloucestershire
56	18.67	Dimitri Mascarenhas	Hampshire
56	34.55	Robert Croft	Glamorgan
56	35.59	Andy Caddick	Somerset
53	27.64	David Harrison	Glamorgan

== See also ==
- 2004 English cricket season
- 2004 Cheltenham & Gloucester Trophy
- 2004 Totesport League
- 2004 Twenty20 Cup
