= Matthew Wood (cricketer, born 1980) =

English cricketer (born 1980)

Matt Wood
Personal information
- Full name: Matthew James Wood
- Born: 30 September 1980 (age 46); Exeter, Devon, England
- Batting: Right-handed
- Bowling: Right-arm off break
- Role: Batsman

Domestic team information
- Years: Team
- 2001–2007: Somerset
- 2007–2010: Nottinghamshire

Career statistics
Competition	FC	LA	T20
Matches	101	97	52
Runs scored	5,332	2,339	1,334
Batting average	32.91	26.88	27.79
100s/50s	9/34	2/16	0/7
Top score	297	129	94
Balls bowled	91	–	–
Wickets	0	–	–
Bowling average	–	–	–
5 wickets in innings	–	–	–
10 wickets in match	–	–	–
Best bowling	–	–	–
Catches/stumpings	31/–	14/–	6/–
- Source: CricketArchive, 3 August 2011

Matthew James Wood (born 30 September 1980) is a retired English cricketer, who played for Somerset and Nottinghamshire as a right-handed batsman and occasional right-arm off-break bowler.

== Career ==
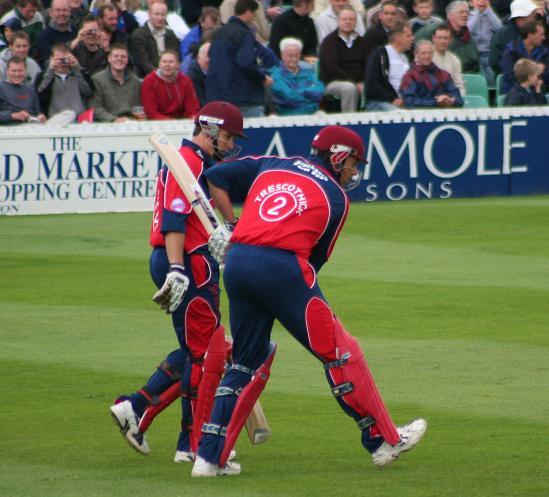
Wood and Marcus Trescothick walking out to meet Gloucestershire, June 27, 2007

=== Somerset: 2001–2007 ===
He made his first-class debut for Somerset against Yorkshire in 2001 and scored 71 in a total of 553 for five wickets. His maiden first-class century was 122 against Northamptonshire in 2001. Wood scored 297 against Yorkshire in 2005. He got out trying to hit a 6 to bring up his 300 but was caught at long on. He scored over 1000 first-class runs in 2005 at an average of 48 but 2006 was his least successful season to date with just 622 runs at an average of 23. After Graeme Smith left in 2005, he was appointed as Somerset's official vice captain.

=== Nottinghamshire: 2008–2010 ===
In the late part of the 2007 English cricket season, Wood signed for Nottinghamshire on a three-year deal, to replace departing opener Jason Gallian. After averaging 24.66 in four Championship matches in the 2010 season, Wood was released.

== Post-playing career ==
After retiring from first-class cricket at the end of the 2010 season, Wood replaced Eddie Burke as Player Pathway Development Officer at Nottinghamshire.
