= 2013 County Championship =

English cricket tournament

- Tournament logo
- Dates: 10 April – 27 September 201
- Administrator: England and Wales Cricket Board
- Cricket format: First-class cricket (4 days)
- Tournament format: League system
- Champions: Durham (3rd title)
- Participants: 18
- Matches: 144
- Most runs: 1,375 – Moeen Ali (Worcestershire)
- Most wickets: 70 – Graham Onions (Durham)

The 2013 County Championship season, known as the LV= County Championship for sponsorship reasons, was the 114th cricket County Championship season. It was contested through two divisions: Division One and Division Two. Each team played all the others in their division both home and away. Durham were County Champions for the third time in six seasons. The top two teams from Division Two, Lancashire and Northamptonshire, gained promotion to the first division for the 2014 season, while the bottom two sides from Division One – Derbyshire and Surrey – were relegated to Division Two for 2014.

== Teams ==
Home grounds of each County

=== Division One ===
Team promoted from Division Two

Team	Primary home ground	Other grounds	Coach	Captain	Overseas player(s)
Derbyshire	County Ground, Derby	Queen's Park, Chesterfield	(England) Karl Krikken	(South Africa) Wayne Madsen	(Cricket West Indies) Shivnarine Chanderpaul
Durham	Riverside Ground, Chester-le-Street	—	(England) Geoff Cook	(England) Paul Collingwood	—
Middlesex	Lord's, London	Uxbridge Cricket Club Ground, Uxbridge	(England) Richard Scott	(Australia) Chris Rogers	(Australia) Chris Rogers (Apr-Jun/Aug-Sep) (Australia) Adam Voges (Jul-Aug)
Nottinghamshire	Trent Bridge, Nottingham	—	(England) Mick Newell	(England) Chris Read	(Australia) Ed Cowan (Apr-Jun) (Australia) David Hussey (Jun-Sep)
Somerset	County Ground, Taunton	—	(England) Andy Hurry	(England) Marcus Trescothick	(South Africa) Alviro Petersen (Apr-May/Jul) (South Africa) Dean Elgar (May-Jun) (India) Piyush Chawla (Aug-Sep)
Surrey	The Oval, London	Woodbridge Road, Guildford	(England) Chris Adams (Apr-Jun) (England) Alec Stewart (acting, Jun-Sep)	(South Africa) Graeme Smith	(South Africa) Graeme Smith (Apr-May) (Australia) Ricky Ponting (May-Jul) (South Africa) Hashim Amla (Aug-Sep)
Sussex	County Ground, Hove	Arundel Castle Cricket Club Ground, Arundel; Cricket Field Road Ground, Horsham	(England) Mark Robinson	(Ireland) Ed Joyce	(Australia) Steve Magoffin
Warwickshire	Edgbaston, Birmingham	—	(Scotland) Dougie Brown	(England) Jim Troughton	(New Zealand) Jeetan Patel
Yorkshire	Headingley, Leeds	North Marine Road Ground, Scarborough	(Australia) Jason Gillespie	(England) Andrew Gale	(New Zealand) Kane Williamson (Aug-Sep)

=== Division Two ===
Team relegated from Division One

Team	Primary home ground	Other grounds	Coach	Captain	Overseas player(s)
Essex	County Ground, Chelmsford	Castle Park Cricket Ground, Colchester	(England) Paul Grayson	(England) James Foster	(Australia) Rob Quiney (Apr-May) (New Zealand) Hamish Rutherford (Jun-Jul) (India) Gautam Gambhir (Aug-Sep)
Glamorgan	SWALEC Stadium, Cardiff	Penrhyn Avenue, Rhos-on-Sea; St Helen's, Swansea	(Australia) Matthew Mott	(Wales) Mark Wallace	(Australia) Marcus North (Apr-Jul/Aug) (New Zealand) Nathan McCullum (Jul)
Gloucestershire	County Ground, Bristol	College Ground, Cheltenham	(New Zealand) John Bracewell	(Australia) Michael Klinger	(Australia) Michael Klinger
Hampshire	The Rose Bowl, Southampton	—	(England) Giles White	(England) Jimmy Adams	(Australia) George Bailey (Apr-May) (Pakistan) Sohail Tanvir (Jun-Aug)
Kent	St Lawrence Ground, Canterbury	Nevill Ground, Tunbridge Wells	(Cricket West Indies) Jimmy Adams	(England) James Tredwell	(South Africa) Vernon Philander (Jul)
Lancashire	Old Trafford, Manchester	Aigburth, Liverpool; Trafalgar Road Ground, Southport	(England) Peter Moores	(England) Glen Chapple	(Australia) Simon Katich
Leicestershire	Grace Road, Leicester	—	(England) Phil Whitticase	(Cricket West Indies) Ramnaresh Sarwan	(Cricket West Indies) Ramnaresh Sarwan (Apr-May) (Australia) Joe Burns (May-Jul)
Northamptonshire	County Ground, Northampton	—	(England) David Ripley	(England) Stephen Peters	(Australia) Trent Copeland (Apr-Jun/Aug-Sep) (Australia) Cameron White (Jul-Aug)
Worcestershire	County Ground, New Road, Worcester	—	(England) Steve Rhodes	(England) Daryl Mitchell	(Sri Lanka) Thilan Samaraweera

== Report ==
=== Division One ===
Defending champions Warwickshire had a disappointing start to the season, only managing a draw against newly promoted Derbyshire in a game that was dominated by bad weather. Somerset, runners-up the previous season, collapsed from 96/2 at the end of the third day against Durham to 186 all out, in the process losing by 48 runs to the champions of 2008 and 2009. Middlesex defeated Nottinghamshire by ten wickets at Trent Bridge. This was the latter county's first loss in an opening fixture for eleven years. Yorkshire, the other team promoted from Division Two in 2012, also lost at home – they fell to an innings defeat against Sussex, having been bowled out for just 96 in their first innings. Middlesex and Sussex jointly led the table on 23 points after the first round of games, with only Surrey yet to play their first match.

Despite having a slight first-innings lead, Derbyshire lost within three days against Middlesex at Lord's, having been bowled out for just 60 in their second innings, their lowest total against Middlesex. Surrey's first game of the season ended as a draw against Somerset, in part as a result of play being lost due to rain. Durham suffered a change in fortunes, falling to a heavy defeat against Warwickshire, who bowled them out for 94 after setting a target of 413 to win. Nottinghamshire picked up their first win of the season against Derbyshire, who had yet to win themselves on their return to Division One. Surrey drew their second consecutive game at The Oval, this time against Sussex, on a pitch that appeared to favour batting. Durham fell to a second consecutive defeat when Yorkshire set a record for the highest successful chase at Chester-le-Street. Warwickshire's tenth-wicket partnership denied Somerset their first victory of the season, holding out for 78 minutes in a match that was somewhat overshadowed by a series of questionable umpiring decisions. Middlesex, with two wins out of two, remained at the top of the table at the end of April, eight points clear of Warwickshire.

Durham subjected Nottinghamshire to a second consecutive home defeat, chasing a target of 183 in just over twenty overs. Derbyshire's miserable season continued with an innings loss against Yorkshire in a match that appeared to be heading for a draw. The matches between Middlesex and Surrey, and Sussex and Warwickshire were both drawn, allowing Durham to take the lead in the standings, with four other teams – Middlesex, Yorkshire, Warwickshire and Sussex – within ten points of the lead. In a match heavily affected by bad weather, Somerset hung on for a draw against Yorkshire, finishing on 61/6 after being made to follow-on. The weather also intervened in the match between Warwickshire and Middlesex at Edgbaston, which ended in a high-scoring draw. Durham's third win in five games, this time against Surrey, extended their Championship lead to 13.5 points over nearest rivals Middlesex.

Yorkshire's impressive start to the season continued when they inflicted an innings defeat on defending champions Warwickshire, dismissing them for under 200 in both innings. Somerset fell to their first home Championship defeat since the end of 2011, losing to Middlesex by nine wickets in three days. Sussex condemned the struggling Derbyshire to their fourth straight loss, with more than two sessions to spare at Derby. Surrey's difficult season continued when they lost to Nottinghamshire by over a hundred runs in a fairly low-scoring match. Sussex completed an innings victory against Somerset within two days, bowling their opponents out for just 76 and 108 in the two innings. Championship contenders Durham and Middlesex drew at Chester-le-Street after rain curtailed play on the third day. Durham ended up four wickets short of securing another victory. The game between Somerset and Yorkshire at Taunton also resulted in a rain-affected draw. Nevertheless, Yorkshire led the table at the end of May, a single point ahead of Sussex, and a further point clear of Middlesex. Somerset, Surrey and Derbyshire, all yet to win a game, were early contenders for relegation.

The match between fellow strugglers Derbyshire and Surrey ended in a high-scoring draw, while Nottinghamshire fell four wickets short of defeating early title contenders Sussex. The 2010 champions drew a second game in a week in a high-scoring encounter against Yorkshire. Draws also resulted in the contests between Middlesex and Sussex, Surrey and Warwickshire, and Somerset and Durham. Yorkshire defeated Middlesex by ten wickets, their first win at Lord's for 26 years. On the same day, Durham completed a narrow victory over Warwickshire, placing them back in title contention. Sussex, while remaining unbeaten, could only manage a draw with Surrey. The contest between Nottinghamshire and Derbyshire also ended in a high-scoring draw. Somerset achieved their first win of the season away at fellow relegation candidates Derbyshire, while Surrey managed a fourth successive draw, this time against title contenders Yorkshire. A draw for Sussex against Nottinghamshire was enough to give them second place in the table, eight points behind Yorkshire, and 8.5 ahead of Durham, at the halfway stage of the season.

After a two-week break, Championship cricket returned on 8 July. Sussex beat Somerset for the second time in 2013, this time in just three days. Derbyshire's relegation worries were not abated when they lost by 279 runs to title contenders Durham, who bowled them out for under 200 in both innings. Middlesex's title ambitions were dented by a loss to Warwickshire on a turning pitch at Uxbridge, while an unbeaten century from Ricky Ponting in his final first-class innings was enough to save Surrey from a defeat against Nottinghamshire. A victory for Warwickshire against Nottinghamshire gave the defending champions a faint hope of being able to retain their title, while more realistic title hopefuls Yorkshire completed an innings defeat against Derbyshire, their seventh loss in ten games. Sussex's chances of claiming their first Championship for six years were damaged with their first loss of the season, at Hove against Middlesex. Yorkshire topped the table at the end of July, seven points clear of, and with a game in hand over, second-placed Sussex. Durham were third, 19.5 points behind Yorkshire, but with an extra game left to play.

Middlesex defeated fellow title challengers Durham within three days in a low-scoring match in which neither side posted a score above 200. Sussex lost their second consecutive Championship game, this time against relegation-battling Derbyshire, who took their first win of the season, and their first victory at Hove for seventeen years. The prevalence of heavy rain thwarted any hopes of a result in the matches between Somerset and Nottinghamshire, and Yorkshire and Warwickshire. Derbyshire's hopes of survival were boosted by a win against Middlesex, whose title ambitions were dented, while a draw for Warwickshire at home to Somerset left their hopes of retaining the Championship increasingly slim. Meanwhile, Yorkshire defeated Nottinghamshire to take their sixth victory of the season, strengthening their lead at the top of the table, while at Chester-le-Street, an emphatic victory for Durham over Surrey ensured that Yorkshire's position was not left unchallenged. Yorkshire, with four games remaining had 181 points, while Durham, with an additional game yet to play, were 25.5 points behind the leaders. In the relegation battle, two points separated seventh-placed Derbyshire and eighth-placed Somerset, while Surrey, albeit with a game in hand, were a further thirteen points back in last place.

Somerset's hopes of retaining their place in Division One were assisted by an innings victory over Middlesex at Lord's, with the erstwhile title contenders being bowled out for just 106 and 164 in their two innings. The match between Warwickshire and Sussex petered out into a draw when neither side could agree to set up a fourth-innings chase. The gap between the two leading sides was closed considerably when Durham defeated Yorkshire by seven wickets, in what was the first-placed county's first loss since their opening fixture of the season. Surrey's first win of the season, against relegation rivals Derbyshire, allowed them to move above their opponents in the table, while remaining adrift of both Somerset and Nottinghamshire. However, four days later, Surrey fell to their fourth defeat of the season, against Middlesex, in a match in which off-spinner Ollie Rayner took fifteen wickets. A comprehensive victory against Sussex within three days put Durham into the lead of the Championship, 14.5 points ahead of Yorkshire, with three games apiece to be played. At the other end of the table, Derbyshire won in a close-fought contest at Taunton, where having been nearly 200 behind after their first innings, Somerset recovered to post Derbyshire a target of 244, which was achieved with two wickets to spare. A washout on the final day of their game denied Nottinghamshire a chance to win against Warwickshire, leaving the 2010 champions on the cusp of the relegation battle. A rain-affected draw for Yorkshire against Sussex, while Durham completed a nine-wicket victory against Derbyshire (bowling them out for just 63 in the second innings), left Yorkshire trailing Durham by 27.5 points with two games each remaining. Meanwhile, in the relegation battle, a win for Somerset over Surrey, and a draw for Nottinghamshire against Middlesex, ensured that both Somerset and Nottinghamshire were clear of the relegation zone. Derbyshire and Surrey occupied the bottom two spots, with one and two games left, respectively.

Durham clinched the County Championship on 19 September by winning their match against Nottinghamshire by eight wickets, giving them an unassailable 48.5 point lead over Yorkshire, who, the following day, completed an 80 run victory against Middlesex to secure second place in the table. When Warwickshire defeated Surrey by six wickets at Edgbaston, the latter county's relegation to Division Two for 2014 was confirmed. The following week, the remaining relegation spot was taken by Derbyshire, who were also condemned to Division Two by losing a match to Warwickshire – on this occasion by an innings, after being bowled out for 103 and 120. With the prospect for relegation for both counties removed, Nottinghamshire and Somerset drew their match at Trent Bridge, while the game between Surrey and Yorkshire, whose fates had already been decided the previous week, ended as a high-scoring draw. Sussex won their final match, against champions-elect Durham, to clinch third in the standings, leaving Warwickshire and Middlesex in fourth and fifth, respectively, while Somerset and Nottinghamshire ended level on points, with the former taking sixth place, with three wins to the latter's two.

=== Division Two ===
The opening round of games, which included a contest between the two counties relegated from Division One (Lancashire and Worcestershire), ended with all four matches drawn. The following week, Northamptonshire subjected Essex to an innings defeat, bowling the visitors out for just 183 and 207, in a match that was completed within three days. Glamorgan defeated Worcestershire at Cardiff for the first time in 42 years, while the match between Leicestershire and Kent ended in a high-scoring draw. Worcestershire fell to a second successive defeat, this time against Hampshire, who completed an innings victory, their first win of the season, after rain thwarted their chances against Leicestershire in the first round of games. Northamptonshire took a maximum 24 points in their game against Gloucestershire after claiming a seven-wicket win, while the match between Lancashire and Kent at Old Trafford culminated in a rain-affected draw. At the end of April, Northamptonshire were the early leaders, having played three matches (in contrast to two for most other counties), with Hampshire twenty points behind in second (with a game in hand), while third-placed Glamorgan were eight points away from the promotion spots.

Essex took their first win of the season against the previously unbeaten Hampshire, chasing their target of 143 with four wickets to spare, after previously collapsing to 31/6. Gloucestershire also picked up their first win in the first week of May, in a low-scoring contest with Leicestershire, in which neither side reached 300 in a single innings. Northamptonshire took their third consecutive victory of the season when they defeated Kent, with their overseas signing Trent Copeland taking ten wickets in the match. Glamorgan, who were sixty runs away from victory against Lancashire, for the loss of just two wickets, suffered a dramatic collapse at Colwyn Bay, losing their last eight wickets for just 45 runs. This was Glamorgan's first loss of the season, and Lancashire's first win. A week later, Lancashire took a second win when they chased down the target of 253, set by Essex, within just 47 overs. There were draws in the matches between Gloucestershire and Hampshire, which saw the hosts resort to using four substitute fielders at one point, and Worcestershire and Leicestershire, in which a day's worth of play was lost due to rain. Worcestershire took their first win of the season against the struggling Kent, who were bowled out for just 63 in their second innings, with the result coming within two days. In a closely fought contest, Essex defeated Glamorgan at Cardiff by five wickets, while Northamptonshire's run of three consecutive victories came to an end when their match against Leicestershire ended in a draw. Glamorgan's hopes of victory at Grace Road, after making Leicestershire follow on, were eliminated when less than an hour's play was possible on day four of the match. Worcestershire took a second consecutive victory when they defeated Gloucestershire by ten wickets, while the match between Essex and Kent, in which the third day's play was lost to rain, was drawn. The best part of a day's worth of play was also lost in the contest between Hampshire and Lancashire, which consequently ended as another draw. Rain eliminated more than 200 overs in the match between Worcestershire and Essex; as a result, only two innings were possible, and the match was drawn. At the end of May, Northamptonshire, who were unbeaten after five matches, still led the table, while Worcestershire and Essex, who had played two more games each than their closest rivals, were second and third, respectively. Lancashire, also unbeaten, were the next highest-placed team to have played just five matches.

The remaining games begun before the end of May – the contests between Kent and Leicestershire, Northamptonshire and Hampshire, and Lancashire and Gloucestershire – were all curtailed at some point by poor weather, and all finished as draws. The following week, Northamptonshire strengthened their lead at the top of Division Two by winning against Worcestershire by ten wickets. There were relatively high-scoring draws in the matches between Gloucestershire and Glamorgan, and Hampshire and Kent. Rain severely curtailed the game between Leicestershire and Northamptonshire, which resulted in a draw despite the latter county's apparent advantage. After both captains agreed to forfeit an innings each, Gloucestershire defeated Hampshire by 198 runs in a match that would otherwise have likely ended as a draw. Lancashire continued their unbeaten run with an innings victory against Essex, who were bowled out for just 20 in their second innings, their own record lowest total, and the lowest total against Lancashire. Kent were able to salvage a draw against Glamorgan, despite a first innings deficit of 243 runs. In the final round of games in June, Lancashire won against their main rivals Northamptonshire inside two days, while Worcestershire defeated Glamorgan by eight wickets, Leicestershire, yet to win a Championship match in 2013, were beaten by Essex in a closely fought contest. At the end of June, Northamptonshire still led Division Two. Lancashire were 17 points adrift, although they had a game in hand over the leaders. Worcestershire and Essex, 16 and 17 points behind Lancashire, respectively, were also very much in contention for promotion. Kent and Leicestershire, neither of which had yet won a game, were at the bottom of the table.

After a short break, the County Championship returned to action in the second week of July. Hampshire's 41 run first innings lead against Glamorgan proved to be crucial, as they won the game by just 43 runs. Lancashire's victory against title rivals Northamptonshire at Northampton promoted the visitors to the top spot in the Division Two standings, ahead of their hosts for that game. Kent chased 411 in the fourth innings of their game against Gloucestershire to claim their first Championship victory of the season. However, a flat pitch in their match against Hampshire prevented any chance of a second consecutive win – the contest ended as a high-scoring draw. Despite a twelve-wicket match haul for Simon Kerrigan, division leaders Lancashire could also only manage a draw against Glamorgan. Leicestershire continued to struggle for Championship form, falling to an innings defeat against Essex. Worcestershire's chances of promotion were dented when Gloucestershire completed a six wicket victory over them. At the end of July all nine counties had completed ten games apiece, and Lancashire, the only unbeaten team in the division, led Northamptonshire by eight points, while Essex were a further eighteen points adrift in third. Leicestershire, the only winless team at this stage, were eighteen points behind their nearest rivals, Glamorgan.

In the first week of August, Leicestershire fell to another innings defeat, this time against top-of-the-division Lancashire. The remaining three fixtures of the week – the matches between Worcestershire and Kent, Hampshire and Glamorgan, and Northamptonshire and Gloucestershire – all culminated in rain-affected draws. Northamptonshire took a second consecutive draw two weeks later, in a game against Essex in which the third day's play was lost. Four months after their first Championship win of the season, Glamorgan claimed a second victory, an innings win against the struggling Leicestershire. The loss of the entire final day's play prevented a result in the match between Kent and Gloucestershire – had play been possible, the visitors would have required a further 92 runs with only one wicket in hand. A fifth win in six games, this time against Worcestershire, gave Lancashire a 34-point lead in the points standings. An innings victory inside three days against Glamorgan strengthened Northamptonshire's chances of achieving promotion to Division One. Lancashire maintained their healthy lead at the top of the table by defeating Hampshire by 122 runs at Southport, while Leicestershire fell to a fifth consecutive defeat, this time against Worcestershire, whose hopes of promotion were boosted by the result. Meanwhile, the match between Gloucestershire and Essex ended in a high-scoring draw. At the end of August, Lancashire held a 33-point lead over Northamptonshire. Essex and Worcestershire, who were 44 and 45 points, respectively, behind Northamptonshire, were still technically promotion contenders. Leicestershire's continuing poor form left them 27 points behind next-to-bottom Kent.

Leicestershire fell to yet another innings defeat in their game against mid-table Gloucestershire, the match being completed within three days. Victory for Essex against their rivals Worcestershire kept the former side in contention for promotion, while the latter county's chances were essentially eliminated by the result. Kent joined Glamorgan on two Championship wins by defeating the Welsh county inside three days at Cardiff. The match between Hampshire and Northamptonshire ended in a draw, although it could technically have been called off and restarted at another time, as a result of the absence of Hampshire's scorer on the final day, due to illness. Lancashire, who drew their match against Leicestershire, were assured of promotion when Essex failed to beat Kent. Worcestershire, resigned to remaining in Division Two in 2014, also drew in their game against Hampshire. Leicestershire lost their final match of the season against Hampshire without picking up a single bonus point; they failed to win a single Championship match all season for the first time in their history. Draws in the matches between Essex and Glamorgan, and Northamptonshire and Kent, left Northamptonshire as firm favourites for the second promotion spot, while Lancashire clinched the Division Two title after drawing their game against Gloucestershire. Although Northamptonshire were defeated by Worcestershire, they still secured promotion by virtue of the fact that Essex also lost in their match against Hampshire. Glamorgan ended their season with an eight-wicket win against Gloucestershire, while Division Two champions Lancashire fell to their first, and only, defeat of the season in their game against Kent, who were set 418 to win. Lancashire finished 36 points clear of Northamptonshire, whose advantage over third-placed Essex was 20 points. Hampshire, Worcestershire and Gloucestershire were split by just four points, while there were only two points between Kent and Glamorgan. Leicestershire ended 70 points behind eighth-placed Glamorgan.

== Standings ==
- Pld = Played, W = Wins, L = Losses, D = Draws, T = Ties, A = Abandonments, Bat = Batting points, Bowl = Bowling points, Ded = Deducted points, Pts = Points.

Teams receive 16 points for a win and 3 for a draw. Bonus points (a maximum of 5 batting points and 3 bowling points) may be scored during the first 110 overs of each team's first innings.

=== Division One ===
Team	P	W	L	D	A	Bat	Bowl	Ded	Pts
Durham (C)	16	10	4	2	0	36	46	2.5	245.5
Yorkshire	16	7	2	7	0	49	39	0.0	221
Sussex	16	5	3	8	0	45	39	0.0	188
Warwickshire	16	5	2	9	0	37	42	0.0	186
Middlesex	16	6	5	5	0	32	39	0.0	182
Somerset	16	3	5	8	0	33	41	0.0	146
Nottinghamshire	16	2	5	9	0	47	40	0.0	146
Derbyshire (R)	16	3	10	3	0	31	34	0.0	122
Surrey (R)	16	1	6	9	0	36	37	0.0	116

=== Division Two ===
Team	P	W	L	D	A	Bat	Bowl	Ded	Pts
Lancashire (P)	16	8	1	7	0	45	45	1.0	238
Northamptonshire (P)	16	5	3	8	0	55	43	0.0	202
Essex	16	5	4	7	0	43	41	3.0	182
Hampshire	16	4	3	9	0	45	35	0.0	171
Worcestershire	16	5	6	5	0	29	43	0.0	167
Gloucestershire	16	4	4	8	0	43	36	0.0	167
Kent	16	3	2	11	0	39	31	0.0	151
Glamorgan	16	3	6	7	0	41	39	0.0	149
Leicestershire	16	0	8	8	0	23	32	0.0	79

== Results summary ==
The fixtures for 2013 were announced in November 2012.

=== Division One ===
	Derbyshire	Durham	Middlesex	Nottinghamshire	Somerset	Surrey	Sussex	Warwickshire	Yorkshire
Derbyshire		Durham; 9 wickets	Derbyshire; 56 runs	Nottinghamshire; 9 wickets	Somerset; 4 wickets	Match drawn	Sussex; 9 wickets	Warwickshire inn & 168 runs	Yorkshire inn & 113 runs
Durham	Durham; 279 runs		Match drawn	Durham; 8 wickets	Durham; 48 runs	Durham inn & 144 runs	Durham; 285 runs	Durham; 11 runs	Yorkshire; 4 wickets
Middlesex	Middlesex; 9 wickets	Middlesex; 6 wickets		Match drawn	Somerset inn & 179 runs	Match drawn	Match drawn	Warwickshire; 5 wickets	Yorkshire; 10 wickets
Nottinghamshire	Match drawn	Durham; 6 wickets	Middlesex; 10 wickets		Match drawn	Nottinghamshire; 114 runs	Match drawn	Match drawn	Yorkshire; 10 wickets
Somerset	Derbyshire; 2 wickets	Match drawn	Middlesex; 9 wickets	Match drawn		Somerset; 7 wickets	Sussex; 9 wickets	Match drawn	Match drawn
Surrey	Surrey; 4 wickets	Durham; 5 wickets	Middlesex; 146 runs	Match drawn	Match drawn		Match drawn	Match drawn	Match drawn
Sussex	Derbyshire; 9 wickets	Sussex; 6 wickets	Middlesex; 10 wickets	Match drawn	Sussex inn & 116 runs	Match drawn		Match drawn	Match drawn
Warwickshire	Match drawn	Warwickshire; 318 runs	Match drawn	Warwickshire; 216 runs	Match drawn	Warwickshire; 6 wickets	Match drawn		Yorkshire inn & 139 runs
Yorkshire	Yorkshire inn & 39 runs	Durham; 7 wickets	Yorkshire; 80 runs	Match drawn	Match drawn	Match drawn	Sussex inn & 12 runs	Match drawn	

Home team won	Visiting team won	Match drawn

=== Division Two ===
	Essex	Glamorgan	Gloucestershire	Hampshire	Kent	Lancashire	Leicestershire	Northamptonshire	Worcestershire
Essex		Match drawn	Match drawn	Essex; 4 wickets	Match drawn	Lancashire inn & 105 runs	Essex inn & 25 runs	Match drawn	Essex; 8 wickets
Glamorgan	Essex; 5 wickets		Glamorgan; 8 wickets	Hampshire; 43 runs	Kent; 7 wickets	Lancashire; 14 runs	Glamorgan inn & 37 runs	Match drawn	Glamorgan; 10 wickets
Gloucestershire	Match drawn	Match drawn		Match drawn	Kent; 2 wickets	Match drawn	Gloucestershire inn & 138 runs	Northamptonshire; 7 wickets	Gloucestershire; 6 wickets
Hampshire	Hampshire inn & 31 runs	Match drawn	Gloucestershire; 198 runs		Match drawn	Match drawn	Match drawn	Match drawn	Hampshire inn & 42 runs
Kent	Match drawn	Match drawn	Match drawn	Match drawn		Kent; 2 wickets	Match drawn	Northamptonshire; 7 wickets	Worcestershire; 10 wickets
Lancashire	Lancashire; 3 wickets	Match drawn	Match drawn	Lancashire; 122 runs	Match drawn		Match drawn	Lancashire; 8 wickets	Match drawn
Leicestershire	Essex; 4 wickets	Match drawn	Gloucestershire; 9 wickets	Hampshire; 180 runs	Match drawn	Lancashire inn & 52 runs		Match drawn	Worcestershire; 9 wickets
Northamptonshire	Northamptonshire inn & 9 runs	Northamptonshire inn & 25 runs	Match drawn	Match drawn	Match drawn	Lancashire; 8 wickets	Match drawn		Northamptonshire; 10 wickets
Worcestershire	Match drawn	Worcestershire; 8 wickets	Worcestershire; 10 wickets	Match drawn	Match drawn	Lancashire; 9 wickets	Match drawn	Worcestershire; 115 runs	

Home team won	Visiting team won	Match drawn

== Results in full ==
=== Division One ===
==== April ====
10–13 April
Scorecard

(H) Durham	v	Somerset
250 (93.2 overs); Ben Stokes 49 (110); Steven Kirby 3/58 (24.2 overs)		132 (37.5 overs); Jos Buttler 35 (54); Chris Rushworth 6/58 (13.5 overs)
116 (47.4 overs); Phil Mustard 25 (52); Alfonso Thomas 4/29 (14.4 overs)		186 (63.5 overs); Craig Kieswetter 72 (135); Ben Stokes 3/34 (14 overs)

Durham won by 48 runs
Riverside Ground, Chester-le-Street
Umpires: David Millns and Steve O'Shaughnessy

- Somerset won the toss and elected to field.
- Points: Durham 18.5, Somerset 3.
- Durham were deducted 2.5 points for breach of team salary payments.

10–13 April
Scorecard

(H) Nottinghamshire	v	Middlesex
278 (91.1 overs); Ed Cowan 61 (90); Toby Roland-Jones 6/63 (22.1 overs)		353 (111 overs); John Simpson 97* (205); Ajmal Shahzad 3/75 (26 overs)
182 (47.1 overs); Andre Adams 50 (38); Neil Dexter 5/27 (9 overs)		110/0 (25 overs); Sam Robson 55* (88)

Middlesex won by 10 wickets
Trent Bridge, Nottingham
Umpires: Nick Cook and Neil Mallender

- Middlesex won the toss and elected to field.
- Points: Middlesex 23, Nottinghamshire 5.

10–13 April
Scorecard

Derbyshire	v	Warwickshire (H)
226 (87.1 overs); Tony Palladino 68 (110); Jeetan Patel 3/37 (18 overs)		201/4 (59 overs); Varun Chopra 76 (156); Wes Durston 2/32 (8 overs)

Match drawn
Edgbaston, Birmingham
Umpires: Michael Gough and Jeremy Lloyds

- Warwickshire won the toss and elected to field.
- No play on day 2 due to rain.
- Points: Warwickshire 7, Derbyshire 5.

10–13 April
Scorecard

(H) Yorkshire	v	Sussex
96 (46.2 overs); Jonny Bairstow 29 (65); Chris Jordan 6/48 (15 overs)		356 (80.5 overs); Ben Brown 93 (95); Ryan Sidebottom 4/72 (21.5 overs)
248 (82.1 overs); Gary Ballance 63 (137); Steve Magoffin 5/51 (21.1 overs)

Sussex won by an innings and 12 runs
Headingley, Leeds
Umpires: Nigel Llong and Tim Robinson

- Sussex won the toss and elected to field.
- Points: Sussex 23, Yorkshire 3.

17–20 April
Scorecard

Derbyshire	v	Middlesex (H)
231 (104.5 overs); Billy Godleman 55 (265); Steven Finn 4/51 (26 overs)		215 (77.4 overs); Sam Robson 68 (124); Jonathan Clare 4/40 (12.4 overs)
60 (35 overs); Shivnarine Chanderpaul 18* (78); Tim Murtagh 5/12 (12 overs)		80/1 (21.4 overs); Joe Denly 44* (66); Tony Palladino 1/15 (6 overs)

Middlesex won by 9 wickets
Lord's, London
Umpires: Mark Benson and Peter Hartley

- Middlesex won the toss and elected to field.
- Points: Middlesex 20, Derbyshire 4.

17–20 April
Scorecard

Somerset	v	Surrey (H)
384 (108.4 overs); Alviro Petersen 167 (255); Jade Dernbach 5/57 (27 overs)		366/9d (134.4 overs); Steven Davies 147 (269); Jamie Overton 3/75 (22.4 overs)
251/9d (74.5 overs); Jos Buttler 94 (155); Stuart Meaker 5/60 (13 overs)

Match drawn
The Oval, London
Umpires: Jeff Evans and Richard Kettleborough

- Somerset won the toss and elected to bat.
- Points: Somerset 9, Surrey 8.

17–20 April
Scorecard

(H) Warwickshire	v	Durham
345 (108.2 overs); Jim Troughton 84 (173); Graham Onions 4/86 (26.2 overs)		284 (77.2 overs); Scott Borthwick 101 (130); Keith Barker 3/53 (18 overs)
351/8d (90.2 overs); Tim Ambrose 105 (126); Ben Stokes 3/70 (18 overs)		94 (55 overs); Phil Mustard 28 (119); Chris Wright 6/31 (16 overs)

Warwickshire won by 318 runs
Edgbaston, Birmingham
Umpires: Rob Bailey and Ian Gould

- Durham won the toss and elected to field.
- Points: Warwickshire 22, Durham 5.

24–27 April
Scorecard

(H) Derbyshire	v	Nottinghamshire
256 (82.3 overs); Shivnarine Chanderpaul 87* (153); Stuart Broad 4/57 (22 overs)		443 (144.1 overs); James Taylor 112 (282); Jonathan Clare 3/109 (23 overs)
229 (87.1 overs); Dan Redfern 61 (114); Stuart Broad 4/34 (23 overs)		43/1 (5.4 overs); Michael Lumb 24* (13); Tim Groenewald 1/15 (3 overs)

Nottinghamshire won by 9 wickets
County Ground, Derby
Umpires: Martin Bodenham and Steve O'Shaughnessy

- Nottinghamshire won the toss and elected to field.
- Points: Nottinghamshire 22, Derbyshire 3.

24–27 April
Scorecard

(H) Durham	v	Yorkshire
237 (73.4 overs); Phil Mustard 70 (107); Tim Bresnan 4/41 (20 overs)		177 (55.3 overs); Joe Root 49 (81); Graham Onions 5/63 (19 overs)
275/4d (78 overs); Mark Stoneman 109 (167); Liam Plunkett 2/49 (16 overs)		339/6 (96.5 overs); Joe Root 182 (283); Chris Rushworth 2/36 (20 overs)

Yorkshire won by 4 wickets
Riverside Ground, Chester-le-Street
Umpires: Jeff Evans and Alex Wharf

- Durham won the toss and elected to bat.
- Points: Yorkshire 19, Durham 4.

24–27 April
Scorecard

(H) Surrey	v	Sussex
351 (109.2 overs); Gary Wilson 124 (246); Chris Jordan 5/92 (23.2 overs)		526 (157 overs); Luke Wells 208 (412); Tim Linley 3/82 (32 overs)
308/5d (87 overs); Vikram Solanki 83 (156); Luke Wells 2/44 (14 overs)

Match drawn
The Oval, London
Umpires: Nigel Cowley and Graham Lloyd

- Surrey won the toss and elected to bat.
- Points: Sussex 9, Surrey 8.

25–28 April
Scorecard

(H) Somerset	v	Warwickshire
406 (108.3 overs); Alviro Petersen 136 (187); Rikki Clarke 4/70 (17.3 overs)		158 (65.4 overs); Jim Troughton 26 (96); Alfonso Thomas 3/29 (11 overs)
266/4d (60 overs); Nick Compton 105* (156); Chris Woakes 2/50 (9 overs)		427/9 (144 overs); Varun Chopra 108 (199); Jack Leach 5/63 (44 overs)

Match drawn
County Ground, Taunton
Umpires: Nick Cook and Martin Saggers

- Somerset won the toss and elected to bat.
- Points: Somerset 11, Warwickshire 6.

29 April – 2 May
Scorecard

(H) Nottinghamshire	v	Durham
320 (83.5 overs); James Taylor 97 (189); Ben Stokes 3/58 (19 overs)		471 (157.3 overs); Will Smith 153 (393); Stuart Broad 4/88 (31 overs)
333 (116.2 overs); Michael Lumb 123 (226); Scott Borthwick 4/87 (24.2 overs)		184/4 (20.2 overs); Phil Mustard 72 (54); Graeme Swann 4/56 (7 overs)

Durham won by 6 wickets
Trent Bridge, Nottingham
Umpires: Steve Garratt and Peter Willey

- Nottinghamshire won the toss and elected to bat.
- Points: Durham 22, Nottinghamshire 5.

29 April – 2 May
Scorecard

Derbyshire	v	Yorkshire (H)
475 (142 overs); Chesney Hughes 270* (415); Adil Rashid 3/122 (30 overs)		677/7d (151 overs); Joe Root 236 (336); Tim Groenewald 2/141 (34 overs)
163 (54.4 overs); Wayne Madsen 52 (127); Jack Brooks 5/40 (14.4 overs)

Yorkshire won by an innings and 39 runs
Headingley, Leeds
Umpires: Stephen Gale and Richard Kettleborough

- Yorkshire won the toss and elected to field.
- Points: Yorkshire 21, Derbyshire 5.

==== May ====
1–4 May
Scorecard

Warwickshire	v	Sussex (H)
453 (145 overs); Jonathan Trott 96 (203); Chris Jordan 4/73 (28 overs)		421/7 (145.2 overs); Luke Wells 96 (217); Boyd Rankin 3/60 (22 overs)

Match drawn
County Ground, Hove
Umpires: Neil Mallender and George Sharp

- Warwickshire won the toss and elected to bat.
- Points: Sussex 8, Warwickshire 8.

2–5 May
Scorecard

Surrey	v	Middlesex (H)
338 (129 overs); Rory Burns 114 (267); Tim Murtagh 3/54 (26 overs)		166 (66.2 overs); Sam Robson 36 (92); Zander de Bruyn 3/32 (9.2 overs)
85/1 (25 overs); Graeme Smith 48* (62); Tim Murtagh 1/26 (7 overs)		514/8d (131 overs) (f/o); Chris Rogers 214 (307); Jade Dernbach 2/83 (26 overs)

Match drawn
Lord's, London
Umpires: Michael Gough and David Millns

- Surrey won the toss and elected to bat.
- Points: Surrey 9, Middlesex 4.

7–10 May
Scorecard

(H) Yorkshire	v	Somerset
505/9d (135.4 overs); Adil Rashid 180 (317); Peter Trego 4/107 (33.4 overs)		252 (96 overs); Alviro Petersen 54 (85); Tim Bresnan 4/76 (29 overs)
		61/6 (22.3 overs) (f/o); Marcus Trescothick 33* (61); Jack Brooks 4/22 (5.3 overs)

Match drawn
Headingley, Leeds
Umpires: Martin Bodenham and George Sharp

- Yorkshire won the toss and elected to bat.
- Points: Yorkshire 10, Somerset 7.

8–11 May
Scorecard

Middlesex	v	Warwickshire (H)
428/5d (112.4 overs); Sam Robson 215* (307); Jeetan Patel 3/99 (31 overs)		374/8 (114 overs); Rikki Clarke 66* (76); Tim Murtagh 5/85 (26 overs)

Match drawn
Edgbaston, Birmingham
Umpires: Rob Bailey and Stephen Gale

- Middlesex won the toss and elected to bat.
- Tom Allin (Warks) made his first-class debut.
- Points: Middlesex 10, Warwickshire 8.

10–13 May
Scorecard

(H) Surrey	v	Durham
237 (82.2 overs); Zander de Bruyn 57 (153); Ryan Buckley 5/86 (30.2 overs)		286 (101 overs); Mark Stoneman 77 (113); Gareth Batty 5/80 (31 overs)
229 (86.5 overs); Steven Davies 46 (85); Scott Borthwick 6/70 (27.5 overs)		181/5 (48.2 overs); Mark Stoneman 67 (107); Tim Linley 2/38 (12 overs)

Durham won by 5 wickets
The Oval, London
Umpires: Peter Hartley and Neil Mallender

- Surrey won the toss and elected to bat.
- Ryan Buckley (Durham) made his first-class debut.
- Points: Durham 21, Surrey 4.

15–18 May
Scorecard

(H) Derbyshire	v	Sussex
223 (75 overs); Wayne Madsen 63 (141); James Anyon 3/56 (22 overs)		401 (82.3 overs); Michael Yardy 153 (236); Mark Footitt 6/120 (24 overs)
219 (87.5 overs); Wayne Madsen 32 (73); Steve Magoffin 4/44 (24.5 overs)		43/1 (5.5 overs); Luke Wells 23* (18); Tim Groenewald 1/25 (3 overs)

Sussex won by 9 wickets
County Ground, Derby
Umpires: Nick Cook and Richard Illingworth

- Sussex won the toss and elected to field.
- Points: Sussex 24, Derbyshire 4.

15–18 May
Scorecard

(H) Nottinghamshire	v	Surrey
274 (96.3 overs); Steven Mullaney 68 (112); Stuart Meaker 4/70 (23 overs)		207 (76.2 overs); Gary Wilson 49 (97); Samit Patel 2/4 (8 overs)
191 (66.2 overs); Samit Patel 37 (49); Stuart Meaker 4/64 (20 overs)		144 (52.3 overs); Rory Burns 53 (89); Paul Franks 3/16 (12 overs)

Nottinghamshire won by 114 runs
Trent Bridge, Nottingham
Umpires: Martin Bodenham and Steve O'Shaughnessy

- Surrey won the toss and elected to field.
- Points: Nottinghamshire 21, Surrey 4.

15–18 May
Scorecard

Middlesex	v	Somerset (H)
347 (110.5 overs); Neil Dexter 82 (160); Jamie Overton 6/95 (28.5 overs)		152 (45.2 overs); Peter Trego 34 (47); Tim Murtagh 4/28 (12 overs)
72/1 (12.3 overs); Chris Rogers 25 (30); Jamie Overton 1/39 (6 overs)		265 (84.5 overs) (f/o); Jos Buttler 85 (175); Tim Murtagh 6/49 (21.5 overs)

Middlesex won by 9 wickets
County Ground, Taunton
Umpires: Mark Benson and Neil Mallender

- Somerset won the toss and elected to field.
- Points: Middlesex 22, Somerset 3.

15–18 May
Scorecard

(H) Warwickshire	v	Yorkshire
128 (51.3 overs); Jim Troughton 65* (132); Liam Plunkett 5/32 (13.3 overs)		407 (123 overs); Adil Rashid 110* (158); Jeetan Patel 5/56 (24 overs)
140 (48.2 overs); Jim Troughton 37 (88); Steven Patterson 3/19 (11 overs)

Yorkshire won by an innings and 139 runs
Edgbaston, Birmingham
Umpires: Michael Gough and Trevor Jesty

- Yorkshire won the toss and elected to field.
- Points: Yorkshire 23, Warwickshire 2.

22–25 May
Scorecard

(H) Durham	v	Middlesex
259 (85.2 overs); Phil Mustard 62 (107); Corey Collymore 4/61 (19 overs)		196 (68.2 overs); Neil Dexter 52 (103); Graham Onions 5/39 (20 overs)
240/6d (72 overs); Scott Borthwick 82* (152); Toby Roland-Jones 2/46 (12 overs)		165/6 (50.3 overs); Joe Denly 73* (135); Mark Wood 3/36 (13.3 overs)

Match drawn
Riverside Ground, Chester-le-Street
Umpires: Martin Bodenham and George Sharp

- Middlesex won the toss and elected to field.
- Points: Durham 8, Middlesex 6.

22–25 May
Scorecard

Somerset	v	Sussex (H)
76 (22.4 overs); Jos Buttler 22 (25); Steve Magoffin 8/20 (11 overs)		300 (72 overs); Rory Hamilton-Brown 77 (90); Alfonso Thomas 5/69 (23 overs)
108 (35.3 overs); Jos Buttler 29 (29); Steve Magoffin 4/11 (12.3 overs)

Sussex won by an innings and 116 runs
Cricket Field Road Ground, Horsham
Umpires: Steve Garratt and Tim Robinson

- Somerset won the toss and elected to bat.
- Points: Sussex 22, Somerset 3.

28–31 May
Scorecard

Yorkshire	v	Somerset (H)
450/5d (116.2 overs); Adam Lyth 105 (158); Gemaal Hussain 2/106 (25 overs)		310 (104.3 overs); James Hildreth 115 (174); Moin Ashraf 3/60 (15.3 overs)
104/4d (42 overs); Adam Lyth 57* (134); Steven Kirby 2/19 (8 overs)

Match drawn
County Ground, Taunton
Umpires: Nick Cook and Martin Saggers

- Yorkshire won the toss and elected to bat.
- No play on day 1 due to rain.
- Points: Yorkshire 11, Somerset 7.

30 May – 2 Jun
Scorecard

(H) Derbyshire	v	Surrey
452 (132.1 overs); Wayne Madsen 152 (259); Chris Tremlett 5/95 (30.1 overs)		553/8d (146 overs); Ricky Ponting 192 (271); David Wainwright 3/164 (45 overs)
164/3 (39 overs); Chesney Hughes 68 (76); Chris Tremlett 3/38 (12 overs)

Match drawn
County Ground, Derby
Umpires: Neil Bainton and Nigel Cowley

- Derbyshire won the toss and elected to bat.
- Points: Surrey 9, Derbyshire 8.

31 May – 3 June
Scorecard

Nottinghamshire	v	Sussex (H)
356 (111 overs); Samit Patel 157 (199); Chris Jordan 6/97 (30 overs)		306 (82.5 overs); Ed Joyce 59 (81); Harry Gurney 4/69 (17.5 overs)
330 (94.3 overs); James Taylor 97 (167); Steve Magoffin 4/60 (17 overs)		223/6 (88.3 overs); Ben Brown 51* (100); Ajmal Shahzad 3/71 (16 overs)

Match drawn
County Ground, Hove
Umpires: David Millns and Peter Willey

- Sussex won the toss and elected to field.
- Points: Nottinghamshire 10, Sussex 9.

==== June ====
5–8 June
Scorecard

(H) Middlesex	v	Sussex
499/8d (139 overs); Chris Rogers 184 (305); William Beer 3/89 (30 overs)		222 (83.2 overs); Luke Wright 77 (119); Ollie Rayner 5/63 (28.2 overs)
50/3 (8 overs); Chris Rogers 27* (26); Chris Liddle 2/24 (4 overs)		454 (137 overs) (f/o); Luke Wright 187 (276); Tim Murtagh 3/74 (26 overs)

Match drawn
Lord's, London
Umpires: Martin Saggers and Alex Wharf

- Sussex won the toss and elected to field.
- Points: Middlesex 10, Sussex 5.

5–8 June
Scorecard

Warwickshire	v	Surrey (H)
631/9d (168.4 overs); Varun Chopra 192 (291); Jason Roy 3/35 (5.4 overs)		274 (85.4 overs); Vikram Solanki 69 (78); Boyd Rankin 4/43 (12 overs)
		234/4 (87 overs) (f/o); Rory Burns 85 (198); Jeetan Patel 2/77 (40 overs)

Match drawn
Woodbridge Road, Guildford
Umpires: Martin Bodenham and Nick Cook

- Warwickshire won the toss and elected to bat.
- Points: Warwickshire 11, Surrey 7.

5–8 June
Scorecard

Nottinghamshire	v	Yorkshire (H)
443 (152.5 overs); Michael Lumb 135 (264); Steven Patterson 3/74 (37 overs)		572/8d (155.1 overs); Andrew Gale 272 (404); Luke Fletcher 3/85 (34 overs)
105/1 (24 overs); Ed Cowan 53* (70); Steven Patterson 1/42 (9 overs)

Match drawn
North Marine Road Ground, Scarborough
Umpires: Nigel Cowley and Jeremy Lloyds

- Yorkshire won the toss and elected to field.
- Points: Yorkshire 8, Nottinghamshire 6.

6–9 June
Scorecard

(H) Somerset	v	Durham
458 (132.3 overs); Nick Compton 166 (324); Ryan Buckley 3/128 (34 overs)		493 (134.5 overs); Mark Stoneman 122 (215); Jamie Overton 3/96 (25 overs)
266/8d (82 overs); Alex Barrow 83* (183); Graham Onions 2/33 (13 overs)

Match drawn
County Ground, Taunton
Umpires: Neil Bainton and Trevor Jesty

- Somerset won the toss and elected to bat.
- Points: Somerset 9, Durham 9.

11–14 June
Scorecard

Yorkshire	v	Middlesex (H)
390 (128.1 overs); Andrew Gale 103 (224); Ollie Rayner 3/44 (22.1 overs)		175 (55.2 overs); Gareth Berg 54 (69); Steven Patterson 4/39 (17.2 overs)
7/0 (3.4 overs); Adam Lyth 4* (10)		219 (71.4 overs) (f/o); Sam Robson 46 (78); Adil Rashid 5/78 (24.4 overs)

Yorkshire won by 10 wickets
Lord's, London
Umpires: Trevor Jesty and David Millns

- Yorkshire won the toss and elected to bat.
- Points: Yorkshire 22, Middlesex 2.

12–15 June
Scorecard

(H) Durham	v	Warwickshire
267 (86.5 overs); Ben Stokes 61 (109); Keith Barker 4/41 (19.5 overs)		209 (57 overs); Jeetan Patel 53 (53); Ben Stokes 4/49 (13 overs)
198 (60.2 overs); Mark Stoneman 83 (116); Boyd Rankin 4/55 (13.2 overs)		245 (63.2 overs); Jeetan Patel 50 (59); Graham Onions 5/83 (20 overs)

Durham won by 11 runs
Riverside Ground, Chester-le-Street
Umpires: Nigel Cowley and Martin Saggers

- Durham won the toss and elected to bat.
- Points: Durham 21, Warwickshire 4.

12–15 June
Scorecard

Derbyshire	v	Nottinghamshire (H)
391 (106.3 overs); Shivnarine Chanderpaul 87 (118); Andre Adams 4/69 (24 overs)		436/8d (101.4 overs); Michael Lumb 221* (291); Mark Turner 3/92 (20.4 overs)

Match drawn
Trent Bridge, Nottingham
Umpires: Mark Benson and Jeff Evans

- Nottinghamshire won the toss and elected to field.
- Points: Nottinghamshire 11, Derbyshire 9.

12–15 June
Scorecard

(H) Sussex	v	Surrey
295 (89.1 overs); Michael Yardy 69 (143); Tim Linley 4/68 (21.1 overs)		456/9d (115.3 overs); Vikram Solanki 130 (179); Monty Panesar 5/142 (38 overs)
201/2d (59 overs); Chris Nash 102* (177); Zafar Ansari 2/49 (20 overs)

Match drawn
Arundel Castle Cricket Club Ground, Arundel
Umpires: Stephen Gale and Michael Gough

- Surrey won the toss and elected to field.
- No play on day 1 due to rain.
- Points: Surrey 11, Sussex 7.

21–24 June
Scorecard

(H) Derbyshire	v	Somerset
266 (86.2 overs); Richard Johnson 56 (135); Jamie Overton 3/35 (11.2 overs)		216 (71.3 overs); Marcus Trescothick 50 (114); Tim Groenewald 5/30 (18 overs)
94 (30.2 overs); Billy Godleman 24 (47); Steven Kirby 4/18 (7 overs)		145/6 (32 overs); Nick Compton 56 (79); Jonathan Clare 5/29 (8 overs)

Somerset won by 4 wickets
County Ground, Derby
Umpires: Steve Garratt and George Sharp

- Somerset won the toss and elected to field.
- Points: Somerset 20, Derbyshire 5.

21–24 June
Scorecard

(H) Yorkshire	v	Surrey
433/9d (135.5 overs); Andrew Gale 148 (253); Jon Lewis 3/80 (30 overs)		353/7d (82.5 overs); Kevin Pietersen 177* (188); Jack Brooks 3/64 (18 overs)
254 (93.1 overs); Liam Plunkett 68 (138); Gary Keedy 7/99 (39.1 overs)		4/0 (2 overs); Arun Harinath 4* (6)

Match drawn
Headingley, Leeds
Umpires: Neil Mallender and Steve O'Shaughnessy

- Surrey won the toss and elected to field.
- Jack Leaning (Yorks) made his first-class debut.
- Points: Surrey 9, Yorkshire 8.

22–25 June
Scorecard

Sussex	v	Nottinghamshire (H)
506/5d (110 overs); Ed Joyce 204* (239); Luke Fletcher 3/105 (25 overs)		478/8d (150 overs); James Taylor 204* (358); Chris Jordan 5/130 (32 overs)

Match drawn
Trent Bridge, Nottingham
Umpires: Neil Bainton and Peter Hartley

- Nottinghamshire won the toss and elected to field.
- Points: Sussex 10, Nottinghamshire 8.

==== July ====
8–11 July
Scorecard

(H) Durham	v	Derbyshire
253 (86 overs); Keaton Jennings 93 (222); Mark Footitt 6/53 (19 overs)		113 (41.4 overs); David Wainwright 18* (56); Chris Rushworth 6/64 (14.4 overs)
331/9d (95.1 overs); Keaton Jennings 123 (281); Dan Redfern 3/33 (13.1 overs)		192 (60.4 overs); Shivnarine Chanderpaul 76 (92); Chris Rushworth 4/39 (15 overs)

Durham won by 279 runs
Riverside Ground, Chester-le-Street
Umpires: Stephen Gale and Jeremy Lloyds

- Derbyshire won the toss and elected to field.
- Points: Durham 21, Derbyshire 3.

8–11 July
Scorecard

Warwickshire	v	Middlesex (H)
486/6d (150 overs); Varun Chopra 228 (428); Corey Collymore 2/63 (22 overs)		309 (82.4 overs); Adam Voges 150 (217); Keith Barker 4/47 (15 overs)
111/5 (40.5 overs); Tim Ambrose 47 (75); Ollie Rayner 2/33 (18 overs)		286 (84.2 overs) (f/o); Adam Voges 51 (92); Chris Woakes 3/27 (12.2 overs)

Warwickshire won by 5 wickets
Uxbridge Cricket Club Ground, Uxbridge
Umpires: Mark Eggleston and George Sharp

- Warwickshire won the toss and elected to bat.
- Points: Warwickshire 22, Middlesex 4.

8–10 July
Scorecard

(H) Somerset	v	Sussex
244 (63 overs); James Hildreth 66 (70); Steve Magoffin 4/65 (18 overs)		363 (79.5 overs); Michael Yardy 156 (177); Craig Meschede 2/56 (10 overs)
209 (51.1 overs); James Hildreth 49 (67); Steve Magoffin 4/36 (15.1 overs)		92.1 (19.4 overs); Chris Nash 61 (66); Steven Kirby 1/39 (6 overs)

Sussex won by 9 wickets
County Ground, Taunton
Umpires: Mark Benson and Martin Bodenham

- Somerset won the toss and elected to bat.
- Points: Sussex 23, Somerset 4.

8–11 July
Scorecard

(H) Surrey	v	Nottinghamshire
198 (75.5 overs); Steven Davies 65* (102); Ajmal Shahzad 3/43 (11.5 overs)		410 (136.3 overs); Samit Patel 110 (200); Chris Tremlett 3/77 (27 overs)
395/8d (148 overs); Ricky Ponting 169* (319); Samit Patel 3/109 (51 overs)

Match drawn
The Oval, London
Umpires: Rob Bailey and Martin Saggers

- Surrey won the toss and elected to bat.
- Points: Nottinghamshire 10, Surrey 5.

15–18 July
Scorecard

(H) Warwickshire	v	Nottinghamshire
463 (154.3 overs); Laurie Evans 178 (331); Luke Fletcher 3/57 (21.3 overs)		217 (73.1 overs); James Taylor 80 (133); Jeetan Patel 4/60 (21 overs)
180/6d (44 overs); Chris Woakes 60 (87); Samit Patel 2/46 (11 overs)		210 (87.2 overs); Alex Hales 58 (182); Jeetan Patel 4/68 (30 overs)

Warwickshire won by 216 runs
Edgbaston, Birmingham
Umpires: Richard Illingworth and Trevor Jesty

- Warwickshire won the toss and elected to bat.
- Points: Warwickshire 22, Nottinghamshire 3.

17–20 July
Scorecard

Yorkshire	v	Derbyshire (H)
617/5d (152.3 overs); Alex Lees 275* (436); Mark Footitt 2/110 (22.3 overs)		235 (67 overs); Tom Poynton 63* (37); Jack Brooks 3/46 (16 overs)
		269 (65.2 overs) (f/o); Wayne Madsen 141 (195); Ryan Sidebottom 3/27 (12 overs)

Yorkshire won by an innings and 117 runs
Queen's Park, Chesterfield
Umpires: Nigel Cowley and Jeff Evans

- Yorkshire won the toss and elected to bat.
- Points: Yorkshire 24, Derbyshire 1.

17–20 July
Scorecard

(H) Sussex	v	Middlesex
229 (80.2 overs); Ed Joyce 101 (166); Gareth Berg 3/49 (16.2 overs)		496 (123.4 overs); Sam Robson 166 (261); Monty Panesar 5/95 (31.4 overs)
310 (87.3 overs); Luke Wright 161 (185); Corey Collymore 3/52 (19.3 overs)		44/0 (9 overs); Dawid Malan 19* (26)

Middlesex won by 10 wickets
County Ground, Hove
Umpires: Nick Cook and Jeremy Lloyds

- Middlesex won the toss and elected to field.
- Points: Middlesex 24, Sussex 2.

==== August ====
2–4 August
Scorecard

Durham	v	Middlesex (H)
143 (49.5 overs); Paul Collingwood 30 (63); Steven Finn 4/46 (13.5 overs)		168 (56.2 overs); Neil Dexter 48 (111); Graham Onions 7/62 (19.2 overs)
171 (54.5 overs); Ben Stokes 51 (98); Ollie Rayner 3/25 (5.5 overs)		147/4 (40.4 overs); Eoin Morgan 39* (87); Graham Onions 2/40 (13 overs)

Middlesex won by 6 wickets
Lord's, London
Umpires: Richard Illingworth and Steve O'Shaughnessy

- Middlesex won the toss and elected to field.
- Points: Middlesex 19, Durham 3.

2–5 August
Scorecard

Nottinghamshire	v	Somerset (H)
378 (106 overs); Steven Mullaney 75 (159); Peter Trego 3/61 (21 overs)		188 (74.2 overs); Craig Meschede 59 (87); Luke Fletcher 3/24 (17 overs)
		141/2 (55 overs) (f/o); Nick Compton 70* (166); Ajmal Shahzad 1/41 (12 overs)

Match drawn
County Ground, Taunton
Umpires: Stephen Gale and Tim Robinson

- Nottinghamshire won the toss and elected to bat.
- Points: Nottinghamshire 10, Somerset 6.

2–4 August
Scorecard

(H) Sussex	v	Derbyshire
314 (93.2 overs); Luke Wells 110 (253); Alex Hughes 3/49 (15 overs)		274 (87 overs); Wayne Madsen 97 (170); Chris Jordan 3/73 (23 overs)
133 (47.4 overs); Luke Wright 49 (75); Tim Groenewald 5/40 (15.4 overs)		174/1 (42.3 overs); Ben Slater 66* (134); Chris Jordan 1/33 (7 overs)

Derbyshire won by 9 wickets
County Ground, Hove
Umpires: Russell Evans and Peter Hartley

- Derbyshire won the toss and elected to field.
- Alex Hughes (Derbs) made his first-class debut.
- Points: Derbyshire 21, Sussex 6.

2–5 August
Scorecard

(H) Yorkshire	v	Warwickshire
302 (98.4 overs); Gary Ballance 112 (196); Keith Barker 3/61 (20.5 overs)		309 (110 overs); Laurie Evans 88 (188); Liam Plunkett 4/74 (24 overs)
180 (71 overs); Gary Ballance 45 (119); Chris Woakes 5/42 (15 overs)		3/0 (2 overs); Varun Chopra 2* (7)

Match drawn
Headingley, Leeds
Umpires: Neil Bainton and Mark Benson

- Warwickshire won the toss and elected to field.
- Points: Yorkshire 9, Warwickshire 9.

20–23 August
Scorecard

(H) Derbyshire	v	Middlesex
385 (115 overs); Wayne Madsen 138* (264); Tim Murtagh 3/63 (23 overs)		249 (93.3 overs); Adam Voges 69 (165); Tim Groenewald 3/54 (23 overs)
160 (63.3 overs); Richard Johnson 59 (124); Ollie Rayner 5/67 (23.3 overs)		240 (74.3 overs); Gareth Berg 71 (113); Peter Burgoyne 3/66 (23.3 overs)

Derbyshire won by 56 runs
County Ground, Derby
Umpires: Tim Robinson and Peter Willey

- Middlesex won the toss and elected to field.
- Points: Derbyshire 23, Middlesex 4.

20–23 August
Scorecard

Somerset	v	Warwickshire (H)
340 (92.1 overs); Craig Kieswetter 148 (192); Keith Barker 3/67 (19.1 overs)		407 (142.4 overs); Laurie Evans 138 (259); George Dockrell 6/96 (43.4 overs)
255 (92.3 overs); Nick Compton 91 (169); Jeetan Patel 5/67 (36 overs)		123/3 (31 overs); Varun Chopra 55* (86); Steven Kirby 2/37 (9 overs)

Match drawn
Edgbaston, Birmingham
Umpires: Rob Bailey and Stephen Gale

- Somerset won the toss and elected to bat.
- Points: Warwickshire 9, Somerset 7.

21–23 August
Scorecard

Yorkshire	v	Nottinghamshire (H)
407 (113.3 overs); Adam Lyth 95 (168); Luke Fletcher 5/93 (28.4 overs)		150 (35.4 overs); Ajmal Shahzad 41* (61); Steven Patterson 5/43 (11 overs)
12/0 (0.5 overs); Adam Lyth 12* (5)		266 (71.3 overs) (f/o); Chris Read 58 (110); Adil Rashid 3/22 (8.3 overs)

Yorkshire won by 10 wickets
Trent Bridge, Nottingham
Umpires: Trevor Jesty and George Sharp

- Nottinghamshire won the toss and elected to field.
- Points: Yorkshire 23, Nottinghamshire 2.

22–25 August
Scorecard

(H) Durham	v	Surrey
421 (131 overs); Scott Borthwick 135 (243); Chris Tremlett 8/96 (33 overs)		108 (31.4 overs); Steven Davies 41* (56); Jamie Harrison 5/31 (10.4 overs)
		169 (50.5 overs) (f/o); Hashim Amla 89 (110); Mark Wood 5/44 (13.5 overs)

Durham won by an innings and 144 runs
Riverside Ground, Chester-le-Street
Umpires: Paul Baldwin, Mark Benson and Michael Gough

- Surrey won the toss and elected to field.
- Usman Arshad (Durham) made his first-class debut.
- Points: Durham 23, Surrey 2.

28–30 August
Scorecard

Somerset	v	Middlesex (H)
449 (136 overs); Piyush Chawla 112 (170); Ravi Patel 4/89 (21 overs)		106 (37.5 overs); Ollie Rayner 34* (58); Piyush Chawla 3/8 (4.5 overs)
		164 (51 overs) (f/o); Neil Dexter 35* (92); Lewis Gregory 5/38 (16 overs)

Somerset won by an innings and 179 runs
Lord's, London
Umpires: Jeff Evans and Ian Gould

- Somerset won the toss and elected to bat.
- Points: Somerset 23, Middlesex 2.

28–31 August
Scorecard

Sussex	v	Warwickshire (H)
311 (109.2 overs); Luke Wells 65 (157); Maurice Chambers 5/68 (27.2 overs)		394 (124 overs); Laurie Evans 137 (215); Steve Magoffin 5/87 (26 overs)
394/9d (124.5 overs); Rory Hamilton-Brown 75 (94); Jeetan Patel 3/74 (36 overs)

Match drawn
Edgbaston, Birmingham
Umpires: Steve O'Shaughnessy and Peter Willey

- Sussex won the toss and elected to bat.
- Points: Warwickshire 9, Sussex 8.

28–31 August
Scorecard

Durham	v	Yorkshire (H)
573 (138 overs); Ben Stokes 127 (160); Ryan Sidebottom 4/85 (24 overs)		274 (83 overs); Kane Williamson 84 (167); Ben Stokes 2/32 (14 overs)
124/3 (27.4 overs); Scott Borthwick 65 (85); Adil Rashid 2/47 (7 overs)		419 (123.2 overs) (f/o); Phil Jaques 152 (202); Chris Rushworth 3/72 (24 overs)

Durham won by 7 wickets
North Marine Road Ground, Scarborough
Umpires: Martin Bodenham and Richard Kettleborough

- Durham won the toss and elected to bat.
- Points: Durham 24, Yorkshire 4.

29 August – 1 September
Scorecard

Derbyshire	v	Surrey (H)
219 (89.5 overs); Shivnarine Chanderpaul 46 (74); Tim Linley 4/59 (24.5 overs)		289 (90.5 overs); Vikram Solanki 93 (141); Mark Footitt 4/50 (19 overs)
286 (123.1 overs); Wayne Madsen 59 (168); Gareth Batty 5/71 (28.1 overs)		218/6 (66.4 overs); Hashim Amla 88 (159); Mark Footitt 2/52 (13 overs)

Surrey won by 4 wickets
The Oval, London
Umpires: Nick Cook and Stephen Gale

- Derbyshire won the toss and elected to bat.
- Points: Surrey 21, Derbyshire 4.

==== September ====
3–5 September
Scorecard

(H) Durham	v	Sussex
245 (71.4 overs); Mark Stoneman 96 (129); James Anyon 4/87 (23.4 overs)		112 (44.5 overs); Ben Brown 21 (28); Graham Onions 4/50 (14 overs)
268/8d (79.4 overs); Phil Mustard 73 (154); James Anyon 4/79 (20.4 overs)		116 (39.3 overs); Chris Nash 38 (63); Usman Arshad 3/18 (8 overs)

Durham won by 285 runs
Riverside Ground, Chester-le-Street
Umpires: Nigel Cowley and Steve Garratt

- Durham won the toss and elected to bat.
- Harry Finch (Sssx) made his first-class debut.
- Points: Durham 20, Sussex 3.

3–6 September
Scorecard

Warwickshire	v	(H) Nottinghamshire
298 (88.2 overs); Varun Chopra 76 (114); Luke Fletcher 4/56 (22.2 overs)		359 (85 overs); Samit Patel 117 (171); Maurice Chambers 4/79 (21 overs)
271 (108.3 overs); Darren Maddy 65 (146); Luke Fletcher 5/52 (23.3 overs)

Match drawn
Trent Bridge, Nottingham
Umpires: Jeff Evans and Peter Hartley

- Nottinghamshire won the toss and elected to field.
- Points: Nottinghamshire 10, Warwickshire 8.

3–6 September
Scorecard

(H) Somerset	v	Derbyshire
103 (33.1 overs); Piyush Chawla 27 (29); Tim Groenewald 5/33 (13.1 overs)		298 (85.1 overs); Richard Johnson 68 (142); Piyush Chawla 5/111 (26 overs)
438 (121.4 overs); Nick Compton 95 (205); Tony Palladino 3/57 (19 overs)		244/8 (83.2 overs); Shivnarine Chanderpaul 74* (142); Piyush Chawla 5/97 (29 overs)

Derbyshire won by 2 wickets
County Ground, Taunton
Umpires: Neil Bainton and David Millns

- Somerset won the toss and elected to bat.
- Points: Derbyshire 21, Somerset 3.

3–5 September
Scorecard

Middlesex	v	(H) Surrey
294 (101 overs); Neil Dexter 90* (224); Gary Keedy 3/61 (25 overs)		145 (54.4 overs); Rory Burns 38 (90); Ollie Rayner 8/46 (19.4 overs)
235/9d (53.3 overs); Dawid Malan 50 (93); Gary Keedy 6/101 (25 overs)		238 (94.4 overs); Hashim Amla 84 (192); Ollie Rayner 7/72 (37.4 overs)

Middlesex won by 146 runs
The Oval, London
Umpires: Trevor Jesty and Jeremy Lloyds

- Middlesex won the toss and elected to bat.
- Points: Middlesex 21, Surrey 3.

11–14 September
Scorecard

(H) Derbyshire	v	Durham
298 (104.1 overs); Paul Borrington 75 (226); Chris Rushworth 5/47 (25.1 overs)		325 (113.3 overs); Scott Borthwick 89 (177); Tony Palladino 6/90 (34.3 overs)
63 (29.1 overs); Wayne Madsen 16 (45); Graham Onions 5/23 (15 overs)		37/1 (7.5 overs); Keaton Jennings 18* (18); Tony Palladino 1/18 (3.5 overs)

Durham won by 9 wickets
County Ground, Derby
Umpires: Trevor Jesty and Martin Saggers

- Durham won the toss and elected to field.
- Points: Durham 22, Derbyshire 4.

11–14 September
Scorecard

Nottinghamshire	v	Middlesex (H)
430/7d (129.5 overs); Steven Mullaney 125 (254); Gareth Berg 2/78 (29 overs)		353/7d (98.1 overs); Chris Rogers 108 (155); Andre Adams 4/98 (29.1 overs)

Match drawn
Lord's, London
Umpires: Steve Garratt and Tim Robinson

- Middlesex won the toss and elected to field.
- No play on day 3 due to rain.
- Points: Nottinghamshire 9, Middlesex 8.

11–14 September
Scorecard

Surrey	v	Somerset (H)
195 (83.2 overs); Gareth Batty 39 (64); Alfonso Thomas 4/23 (16.2 overs)		260 (65.4 overs); Nick Compton 66 (88); Zafar Ansari 3/30 (8.4 overs)
197 (58.5 overs); Rory Burns 40 (95); Craig Meschede 4/43 (15 overs)		133/3 (23.4 overs); James Hildreth 36* (38); Jade Dernbach 2/44 (8 overs)

Somerset won by 7 wickets
County Ground, Taunton
Umpires: Peter Hartley and Peter Willey

- Surrey won the toss and elected to bat.
- Dominic Sibley (Surrey) made his first-class debut.
- Points: Somerset 21, Surrey 3.

11–14 September
Scorecard

(H) Sussex	v	Yorkshire
292 (79.5 overs); Ben Brown 84* (168); Ryan Sidebottom 4/50 (15.5 overs)		326 (115.2 overs); Adam Lyth 93 (205); Ashar Zaidi 4/57 (23.2 overs)
333/3d (47 overs); Chris Nash 167* (137); Ryan Sidebottom 1/11 (5 overs)		81/2 (20 overs); Adam Lyth 40* (58); Lewis Hatchett 1/17 (5 overs)

Match drawn
County Ground, Hove
Umpires: Mark Benson and Steve O'Shaughnessy

- Yorkshire won the toss and elected to field.
- Points: Yorkshire 9, Sussex 7.

17–19 September
Scorecard

Nottinghamshire	v	Durham (H)
78 (26.3 overs); Riki Wessels 17 (29); Jamie Harrison 3/4 (4.3 overs)		256 (81.4 overs); Paul Collingwood 88* (184); Andre Adams 4/69 (28 overs)
246 (79.1 overs); Steven Mullaney 72 (162); Graham Onions 3/50 (20 overs)		69/2 (17 overs); Mark Stoneman 35* (46); Harry Gurney 2/14 (3 overs)

Durham won by 8 wickets
Riverside Ground, Chester-le-Street
Umpires: Stephen Gale and Neil Mallender

- Nottinghamshire won the toss and elected to bat.
- Points: Durham 21, Nottinghamshire 3.

17–20 September
Scorecard

Surrey	v	Warwickshire (H)
400/5d (98 overs); Vikram Solanki 162 (246); Keith Barker 3/98 (23 overs)		120/0d (22 overs); Varun Chopra 69* (81); Hashim Amla 0/22 (5 overs)
Innings forfeited		281/4 (91.4 overs); Ateeq Javid 119* (272); Stuart Meaker 2/84 (20.4 overs)

Warwickshire won by 6 wickets
Edgbaston, Birmingham
Umpires: Richard Kettleborough and David Millns

- Warwickshire won the toss and elected to field.
- Points: Warwickshire 17, Surrey 5.

17–20 September
Scorecard

(H) Yorkshire	v	Middlesex
210 (79.5 overs); Andrew Gale 66 (102); Corey Collymore 3/38 (22.5 overs)		128 (41 overs); Sam Robson 45 (70); Ryan Sidebottom 4/27 (16 overs)
194 (53.2 overs); Gary Ballance 90 (114); Tom Helm 3/46 (9 overs)		196 (49.5 overs); Chris Rogers 65 (85); Jack Brooks 4/33 (7.5 overs)

Yorkshire won by 80 runs
Headingley, Leeds
Umpires: Nigel Llong and Martin Saggers

- Middlesex won the toss and elected to field.
- Tom Helm (Middx) made his first-class debut.
- Points: Yorkshire 20, Middlesex 3.

24–26 September
Scorecard

Warwickshire	v	Derbyshire (H)
391/9d (124 overs); Chris Woakes 152* (273); Tim Groenewald 4/92 (24 overs)		103 (43.2 overs); Shivnarine Chanderpaul 52 (100); Keith Barker 5/55 (21 overs)
		120 (29.1 overs) (f/o); Thomas Poynton 41 (43); Chris Woakes 3/36 (8 overs)

Warwickshire won by an innings and 168 runs
County Ground, Derby
Umpires: Neil Mallender and Tim Robinson

- Derbyshire won the toss and elected to field.
- Points: Warwickshire 22, Derbyshire 2.

24–27 September
Scorecard

(H) Nottinghamshire	v	Somerset
406 (104.5 overs); David Hussey 125 (172); Alfonso Thomas 4/103 (26.5 overs)		372 (103.3 overs); James Hildreth 161 (227); Harry Gurney 5/81 (25 overs)
298 (83.4 overs); Steven Mullaney 59 (50); Peter Trego 4/69 (20.4 overs)		101/1 (28 overs); Chris Jones 55* (76); Brett Hutton 1/31 (9 overs)

Match drawn
Trent Bridge, Nottingham
Umpires: Michael Gough and Nigel Llong

- Somerset won the toss and elected to field.
- Points: Nottinghamshire 11, Somerset 10.

24–27 September
Scorecar

Yorkshire	v	Surrey (H)
434 (124.5 overs); Gary Ballance 148 (232); Zafar Ansari 4/70 (27.5 overs)		634/5d (173.4 overs); Dominic Sibley 242 (536); Ryan Sidebottom 2/69 (26.4 overs)
265/6 (71 overs); Gary Ballance 108* (160); Tim Linley 3/33 (10 overs)

Match drawn
The Oval, London
Umpires: Ian Gould and Martin Saggers

- Yorkshire won the toss and elected to bat.
- Points: Surrey 8, Yorkshire 7.

24–27 September
Scorecard

Durham	v	Sussex (H)
164 (51.2 overs); Scott Borthwick 36 (77); James Anyon 5/44 (10.2 overs)		328 (80 overs); Luke Wright 87 (78); Graham Onions 3/103 (20 overs)
458 (115.1 overs); Michael Richardson 129 (178); Chris Jordan 3/92 (24 overs)		297/4 (67.1 overs); Chris Nash 108 (147); Phil Mustard 1/9 (1.1 overs)

Sussex won by 6 wickets
County Ground, Hove
Umpires: Jeremy Lloyds and Steve O'Shaughnessy

- Durham won the toss and elected to bat.
- Points: Sussex 22, Durham 3.

=== Division Two ===
==== April ====
10–13 April
Scorecard

Gloucestershire	v	Essex (H)
409/5d (124 overs); Dan Housego 150 (341); Ravi Bopara 2/56 (16 overs)		353/6 (102 overs); Tom Westley 163 (284); Benny Howell 2/42 (15 overs)

Match drawn
County Ground, Chelmsford
Umpires: Richard Illingworth and Martin Saggers

- Essex won the toss and elected to field.
- Cameron Herring (Glos) made his first-class debut.
- Points: Gloucestershire 9, Essex 8.

10–13 April
Scorecard

(H) Glamorgan	v	Northamptonshire
134 (50 overs); Graham Wagg 26 (36); Steven Crook 4/30 (12 overs)		292 (90.1 overs); James Middlebrook 70 (146); Michael Reed 3/53 (17 overs)
96/4 (42 overs); Will Bragg 39 (75); Andrew Hall 2/16 (8 overs)

Match drawn
SWALEC Stadium, Cardiff
Umpires: Steve Garratt and Trevor Jesty

- Northamptonshire won the toss and elected to field.
- No play on day 4 due to rain.
- Points: Northamptonshire 8, Glamorgan 6.

10–13 April
Scorecard

(H) Hampshire	v	Leicestershire
454/7d (110.1 overs); James Vince 148 (236); Ollie Freckingham 3/100 (23 overs)		143 (48.4 overs); Ramnaresh Sarwan 25 (53); James Tomlinson 4/23 (11.4 overs)
		182/5 (74 overs) (f/o); Ned Eckersley 99* (170); Danny Briggs 2/34 (14 overs)

Match drawn
The Rose Bowl, Southampton
Umpires: Neil Bainton and George Sharp

- Leicestershire won the toss and elected to field.
- No play on day 4 due to rain.
- Ollie Freckingham (Leics) made his first-class debut.
- Points: Hampshire 11, Leicestershire 5.

10–13 April
Scorecard

Worcestershire	v	Lancashire (H)
334 (131.4 overs); Moeen Ali 78 (188); Luke Procter 4/58 (23.4 overs)		448/7d (126 overs); Ashwell Prince 95 (120); Alan Richardson 2/95 (39 overs)
26/1 (11.1 overs); Matthew Pardoe 11 (30); Glen Chapple 1/9 (6 overs)

Match drawn
Old Trafford, Manchester
Umpires: Rob Bailey and Russell Evans

- Lancashire won the toss and elected to field.
- Lancashire 9, Worcestershire 6

17–20 April
Scorecard

Worcestershire	v	Glamorgan (H)
123 (63.1 overs); Moeen Ali 20 (62); Michael Reed 5/27 (15.1 overs)		295 (108.4 overs); Jim Allenby 78 (162); Gareth Andrew 4/79 (32 overs)
207 (84.1 overs); Thilan Samaraweera 79 (168); Jim Allenby 4/27 (20 overs)		36/0 (9.1 overs); Ben Wright 30* (32)

Glamorgan won by 10 wickets
SWALEC Stadium, Cardiff
Umpires: Neil Bainton and Peter Willey

- Glamorgan won the toss and elected to field.
- Points: Glamorgan 21, Worcestershire 3.

17–20 April
Scorecard

Kent	v	Leicestershire (H)
406 (93.5 overs); Geraint Jones 67 (98); Jigar Naik 4/97 (21.5 overs)		495 (169.4 overs); Matthew Boyce 135 (309); Calum Haggett 3/79 (23 overs)
213/2d (62.1 overs); Rob Key 104* (199); Shiv Thakor 1/36 (10 overs)

Match drawn
Grace Road, Leicester
Umpires: Richard Illingworth and Tim Robinson

- Leicestershire won the toss and elected to field.
- Points: Leicestershire 9, Kent 9.

17–20 April
Scorecard

Essex	v	Northamptonshire (H)
183 (52.1 overs); Graham Napier 73* (65); Steven Crook 4/39 (11 overs)		399 (89.4 overs); Steven Crook 88* (104); Graham Napier 6/93 (25 overs)
207 (83.2 overs); Rob Quiney 56 (115); David Willey 5/67 (22 overs)

Northamptonshire won by an innings and 9 runs
County Ground, Northampton
Umpires: Stephen Gale and Nigel Llong

- Northamptonshire won the toss and elected to field.
- Points: Northamptonshire 23, Essex 1.
- Essex were deducted 2 points for a slow over rate.

24–27 April
Scorecard

(H) Gloucestershire	v	Northamptonshire
192 (63.1 overs); Cameron Herring 43 (81); David Willey 4/71 (18 overs)		404 (111 overs); Alex Wakely 88 (166); Will Gidman 4/109 (28 overs)
299 (117.1 overs); Alex Gidman 87 (167); Steven Crook 4/48 (26.1 overs)		90/3 (22.3 overs); David Sales 29* (42); Jack Taylor 1/12 (6 overs)

Northamptonshire won by 7 wickets
County Ground, Bristol
Umpires: Michael Gough and Richard Kettleborough

- Gloucestershire won the toss and elected to bat.
- Points: Northamptonshire 24, Gloucestershire 3.

24–27 April
Scorecard

(H) Hampshire	v	Worcestershire
500/9d (132 overs); James Adams 219* (382); Moeen Ali 4/103 (28 overs)		206 (79.1 overs); Moeen Ali 55 (111); James Tomlinson 3/52 (21 overs)
		252 (98.3 overs) (f/o); Daryl Mitchell 92 (249); Danny Briggs 3/38 (14.3 overs)

Hampshire won by an innings and 42 runs
The Rose Bowl, Southampton
Umpires: Stephen Gale and Neil Mallender

- Hampshire won the toss and elected to bat.
- Points: Hampshire 24, Worcestershire 3.

24–27 April
Scorecard

Kent	v	Lancashire (H)
244 (100.1 overs); Mike Powell 57 (162); James Anderson 4/57 (25.1 overs)		395/7d (135.4 overs); Simon Katich 93 (135); Matt Coles 3/84 (30 overs)
178/2 (61.2 overs); Brendan Nash 100* (141); Glen Chapple 1/36 (12 overs)

Match drawn
Old Trafford, Manchester
Umpires: Trevor Jesty and George Sharp

- Kent won the toss and elected to bat.
- Points: Lancashire 8, Kent 5.

29 April – 2 May
Scorecard

Hampshire	v	Essex (H)
197 (65.5 overs); Sean Ervine 60 (113); David Masters 4/29 (16 overs)		254 (87.3 overs); Graham Napier 74 (105); James Tomlinson 3/40 (18 overs)
199 (93.5 overs); James Vince 67 (152); David Masters 5/41 (22 overs)		143/6 (40.1 overs); Graham Napier 78* (88); David Balcombe 2/32 (12 overs)

Essex won by 4 wickets
County Ground, Chelmsford
Umpires: Mark Benson and Peter Hartley

- Hampshire won the toss and elected to bat.
- Points: Essex 21, Hampshire 3.

30 April – 3 May
Scorecard

(H) Leicestershire	v	Gloucestershire
250 (85 overs); Shiv Thakor 75 (180); Benny Howell 5/57 (19 overs)		280 (93.4 overs); Jack Taylor 61* (69); Robbie Williams 4/69 (20.4 overs)
217 (96.5 overs); Ned Eckersley 45 (90); Will Gidman 4/39 (22 overs)		191/1 (58.1 overs); Michael Klinger 103* (172); Jigar Naik 1/42 (16 overs)

Gloucestershire won by 9 wickets
Grace Road, Leicester
Umpires: Nick Cook and Steve O'Shaughnessy

- Leicestershire won the toss and elected to bat.
- Points: Gloucestershire 21, Leicestershire 5.

==== May ====
1–4 May
Scorecard

Lancashire	v	Glamorgan (H)
123 (52.2 overs); Luke Procter 26 (56); John Glover 3/29 (12 overs)		242 (83.5 overs); Murray Goodwin 69 (134); Simon Kerrigan 4/48 (16 overs)
272 (107.1 overs); Simon Katich 65 (128); John Glover 3/41 (21.1 overs)		139 (37.4 overs); Will Bragg 61 (66); Simon Kerrigan 5/32 (15.4 overs)

Lancashire won by 14 runs
Penrhyn Avenue, Rhos-on-Sea
Umpires: Tim Robinson and Martin Saggers

- Lancashire won the toss and elected to bat.
- Points: Lancashire 19, Glamorgan 4.

1–4 May
Scoreboard

(H) Kent	v	Northamptonshire
271 (94.2 overs); Mike Powell 70 (162); Trent Copeland 5/71 (28.2 overs)		303 (90.1 overs); Stephen Peters 106 (238); Charlie Shreck 4/80 (24 overs)
135 (47.1 overs); Geraint Jones 57 (77); Trent Copeland 5/42 (21 overs)		105/3 (28.3 overs); Stephen Peters 37 (37); Calum Haggett 2/26 (10 overs)

Northamptonshire won by 7 wickets
St Lawrence Ground, Canterbury
Umpires: Rob Bailey and Graham Lloyd

- Kent won the toss and elected to bat.
- Points: Northamptonshire 22, Kent 5.

7–10 May
Scorecard

Essex	v	Lancashire (H)
226 (91.5 overs); Graham Napier 102* (178); Luke Procter 4/66 (22 overs)		177 (58.3 overs); Gareth Cross 45 (98); Tim Phillips 3/20 (5.3 overs)
203/3d (71 overs); Alastair Cook 60 (141); Kyle Hogg 1/34 (16 overs)		253/7 (46.5 overs); Karl Brown 80 (105); Reece Topley 5/80 (14 overs)

Lancashire won by 3 wickets
Old Trafford, Manchester
Umpires: Steve Garratt and Peter Willey

- Essex won the toss and elected to bat.
- Points: Lancashire 18, Essex 3.
- Lancashire and Essex were deducted 1 point each for a slow over rate.

8–11 May
Scorecard

Hampshire	v	Gloucestershire (H)
274 (95.3 overs); James Adams 138* (269); Craig Miles 4/83 (24.3 overs)		400/4d (98.4 overs); Michael Klinger 163 (254); James Tomlinson 2/74 (18 overs)
120/4 (50 overs); Michael Roberts 44 (82); Benny Howell 2/15 (13 overs)

Match drawn
County Ground, Bristol
Umpires: Jeff Evans and Richard Illingworth

- Hampshire won the toss and elected to bat.
- Points: Gloucestershire 11, Hampshire 6.

8–11 May
Scorecard

(H) Worcestershire	v	Leicestershire
320/7d (109.3 overs); Thilan Samaraweera 100* (225); Jigar Naik 5/98 (35 overs)		379/8d (138.2 overs); Ned Eckersley 122 (208); Shaaiq Choudhry 4/111 (45 overs)
61/1d (20 overs); Moeen Ali 24* (34); Jigar Naik 1/20 (9 overs)

Match drawn
County Ground, New Road, Worcester
Umpires: Richard Kettleborough and Martin Saggers

- Worcestershire won the toss and elected to bat.
- Points: Leicestershire 8, Worcestershire 7.

15–18 May
Scorecard

(H) Glamorgan	v	Essex
231 (86.1 overs); Jim Allenby 77 (110); David Masters 5/44 (21.1 overs)		345 (103.3 overs); Ravi Bopara 145 (265); Michael Hogan 6/70 (25.3 overs)
388 (118.1 overs); Mark Wallace 101 (171); David Masters 3/116 (33 overs)		275/5 (68.5 overs); Tom Westley 88 (163); Dean Cosker 2/90 (19 overs)

Essex won by 5 wickets
SWALEC Stadium, Cardiff
Umpires: Nigel Cowley and George Sharp

- Essex won the toss and elected to field.
- Points: Essex 22, Glamorgan 4.

15–18 May
Scorecard

(H) Northamptonshire	v	Leicestershire
355 (107 overs); Andrew Hall 113 (235); Ollie Freckingham 6/125 (31 overs)		234 (71.2 overs); Shiv Thakor 64* (96); Trent Copeland 7/63 (28.2 overs)
215/8d (53 overs); Ben Duckett 53* (65); Ollie Freckingham 3/63 (16 overs)		168/3 (42 overs); Niall O'Brien 59 (118); Trent Copeland 1/41 (15 overs)

Match drawn
County Ground, Northampton
Umpires: Tim Robinson and Alex Wharf

- Leicestershire won the toss and elected to field.
- Ben Duckett (N'hants) made his first-class debut.
- Points: Northamptonshire 10, Leicestershire 7.

17–20 May
Scorecard

(H) Kent	v	Worcestershire
159 (51.2 overs); Sam Northeast 52 (98); Alan Richardson 5/41 (17.2 overs)		194 (69.1 overs); Moeen Ali 54 (88); Matt Coles 5/31 (15.1 overs)
63 (28.3 overs); Ben Harmison 19 (34); Alan Richardson 7/22 (14.3 overs)		31/0 (8.5 overs); Matthew Pardoe 15* (36)

Worcestershire won by 10 wickets
St Lawrence Ground, Canterbury
Umpires: David Millns and Peter Willey

- Worcestershire won the toss and elected to field.
- Points: Worcestershire 19, Kent 3.

21–24 May
Scorecard

Glamorgan	v	Leicestershire (H)
442/9d (132.3 overs); Jim Allenby 138* (204); Nathan Buck 3/83 (31.3 overs)		142 (44.3 overs); Josh Cobb 29 (41); Michael Hogan 4/25 (11.3 overs)
		182/2 (54 overs) (f/o); Greg Smith 70 (136); Michael Reed 1/16 (8 overs)

Match drawn
Grace Road, Leicester
Umpires: Russell Evans and Jeremy Lloyds

- Leicestershire won the toss and elected to field.
- Points: Glamorgan 10, Leicestershire 5.

22–25 May
Scorecard

(H) Essex	v	Kent
212 (82 overs); Graham Napier 58 (79); Darren Stevens 4/36 (23 overs)		296 (103.4 overs); Darren Stevens 136 (223); Reece Topley 3/81 (29.4 overs)
166/5 (60 overs); Ben Foakes 86* (143); Mark Davies 4/36 (15 overs)

Match drawn
County Ground, Chelmsford
Umpires: Michael Gough and Alex Wharf

- Kent won the toss and elected to field.
- No play on day 3 due to rain.
- Points: Kent 8, Essex 7.

22–25 May
Scorecard

Gloucestershire	v	Worcestershire (H)
234 (70.3 overs); Hamish Marshall 45 (86); Alan Richardson 8/37 (21.3 overs)		457 (124.5 overs); Moeen Ali 123 (169); Craig Miles 6/99 (31.5 overs)
254 (104.5 overs); Gareth Roderick 79* (169); Alan Richardson 4/70 (31 overs)		33/0 (4.1 overs); Daryl Mitchell 22* (14)

Worcestershire won by 10 wickets
County Ground, New Road, Worcester
Umpires: Mark Benson and Trevor Jesty

- Worcestershire won the toss and elected to field.
- Point: Worcestershire 23, Gloucestershire 3

23–26 May
Scorecard

Lancashire	v	Hampshire (H)
295 (98.3 overs); Andrea Agathangelou 121 (208); David Balcombe 5/104 (26 overs)		258 (76.5 overs); George Bailey 84 (110); Glen Chapple 5/55 (22 overs)
373/6d (108.2 overs); Steven Croft 101* (147); Sean Ervine 2/17 (9 overs)

Match drawn
The Rose Bowl, Southampton
Umpires: Nigel Cowley and Martin Saggers

- Lancashire won the toss and elected to bat.
- Points: Hampshire 8, Lancashire 8.

28–31 May
Scorecard

Essex	v	Worcestershire (H)
215 (63.2 overs); Tom Westley 90 (180); Jack Shantry 7/69 (18.2 overs)		351/6d (94.5 overs); Daryl Mitchell 156 (263); David Masters 3/70 (22 overs)

Match drawn
County Ground, New Road, Worcester
Umpires: Graham Lloyd and Jeremy Lloyds

- Worcestershire won the toss and chose to field.
- No play on day 1 due to rain.
- Nick Browne (Essex) made his first-class debut.
- Points: Worcestershire 10, Essex 6.

29 May – 1 June
Scorecard

Leicestershire	v	Kent (H)
186 (62.3 overs); Ned Eckersley 32 (35); Darren Stevens 5/39 (19.3 overs)		353/3d (78.3 overs); Brendan Nash 128* (207); Jigar Naik 2/95 (21.3 overs)
139/1 (54.4 overs); Ned Eckersley 65* (135); Darren Stevens 1/18 (8 overs)

Match drawn
Nevill Ground, Royal Tunbridge Wells
Umpires: Stephen Gale and Peter Hartley

- Leicestershire won the toss and chose to bat.
- No play on day 2 due to rain.
- Points: Kent 10, Leicestershire 4.

29 May – 1 June
Scorecard

(H) Lancashire	v	Gloucestershire
310 (84.2 overs); Simon Katich 96 (126); Craig Miles 6/88 (27.2 overs)		222 (77.2 overs); Alex Gidman 110 (175); Simon Kerrigan 5/68 (24.2 overs)
270 (72.3 overs); Ashwell Prince 64 (106); Graeme McCarter 4/95 (22.3 overs)		173/9 (99 overs); Alex Gidman 46 (97); Andrea Agathangelou 2/18 (13 overs)

Match drawn
Aigburth, Liverpool
Umpires: Ismail Dawood and Neil Mallender

- Lancashire won the toss and chose to bat.
- Points: Lancashire 9, Gloucestershire 7.

29 May – 1 June
Scorecard

Hampshire	v	Northamptonshire (H)
206 (88 overs); Liam Dawson 76 (214); Trent Copeland 4/56 (37 overs)		425/9d (144.3 overs); Andrew Hall 130* (295); James Tomlinson 3/75 (23 overs)

Match drawn
County Ground, Northampton
Umpires: Mark Benson and Steve Garratt

- Northamptonshire won the toss and chose to field.
- No play on day 1 due to rain.
- Points: Northamptonshire 9, Hampshire 6.

==== June ====
5–8 June
Scorecard

Glamorgan	v	Gloucestershire (H)
448 (124.1 overs); Murray Goodwin 108 (239); Craig Miles 5/83 (22 overs)		478 (152.2 overs); Michael Klinger 142 (345); Michael Hogan 7/92 (37.2 overs)
176/2d (62.4 overs); Will Bragg 71* (193); Benny Howell 1/14 (10.4 overs)

Match drawn
County Ground, Bristol
Umpires: Paul Baldwin and Peter Hartley

- Gloucestershire won the toss and chose to field.
- Miles Hammond (Glos) made his first-class debut.
- Points: Gloucestershire 8, Glamorgan 7.

5–8 June
Scorecard

(H) Hampshire	v	Kent
455 (145.4 overs); Neil McKenzie 146 (214); Adam Riley 7/150 (43.4 overs)		321/7d (88.3 overs); Ben Harmison 63 (121); David Griffiths 2/70 (15.3 overs)
207/3d (34.4 overs); Liam Dawson 87* (90); Matt Coles 2/29 (5 overs)		296/8 (91.5 overs); Darren Stevens 96 (105); David Balcombe 2/35 (13 overs)

Match drawn
The Rose Bowl, Southampton
Umpires: Steve O'Shaughnessy and Peter Willey

- Hampshire won the toss and chose to bat.
- Points: Hampshire 8, Kent 7.

5–8 June
Scorecard

Worcestershire	v	Northamptonshire (H)
196 (61.2 overs); Moeen Ali 79 (158); Andrew Hall 3/45 (13 overs)		314 (80 overs); Steven Crook 85 (85); Alan Richardson 4/71 (23 overs)
125 (58.1 overs); Moeen Ali 44* (122); Trent Copeland 6/41 (28 overs)		8/0 (2.2 overs); Kyle Coetzer 7* (10)

Northamptonshire won by 10 wickets
County Ground, Northampton
Umpires: Ismail Dawood and David Millns

- Northamptonshire won the toss and chose to field.
- Points: Northamptonshire 22, Worcestershire 3.

11–14 June
Scorecard

Northamptonshire	v	Leicestershire (H)
567/7d (147.1 overs); Kyle Coetzer 219 (402); Alex Wyatt 3/107 (33 overs)		238/6 (80.1 overs); Joe Burns 77 (133); Steven Crook 2/61 (18.1 overs)

Match drawn
Grace Road, Leicester
Umpires: Martin Bodenham and Steve O'Shaughnessy

- Leicestershire won the toss and chose to field.
- Points: Northamptonshire 9, Leicestershire 5.

12–15 June
Scorecard

(H) Essex	v	Lancashire
273 (84.2 overs); James Foster 82 (156); Glen Chapple 3/47 (19.2 overs)		398 (118.4 overs); Simon Katich 122 (199); David Masters 4/72 (30 overs)
20 (14.2 overs); Jaik Mickleburgh 10 (38); Glen Chapple 5/9 (7.2 overs)

Lancashire won by an innings and 105 runs
County Ground, Chelmsford
Umpires: Rob Bailey and Paul Baldwin

- Lancashire won the toss and chose to field.
- Points: Lancashire 23, Essex 5.

12–15 June
Scorecard

Gloucestershire	v	Hampshire (H)
410/9d (116.4 overs); Hamish Marshall 114 (184); Dimitri Mascarenhas 4/61 (25 overs)		Innings forfeited
Innings forfeited		212 (62.1 overs); Dimitri Mascarenhas 41 (50); Will Gidman 4/46 (14 overs)

Gloucestershire won by 198 runs
The Rose Bowl, Southampton
Umpires: Tim Robinson and George Sharp

- Hampshire won the toss and chose to field.
- Points: Gloucestershire 21, Hampshire 3.

12–15 June
Scorecard

Glamorgan	v	Kent (H)
378 (119.4 overs); Murray Goodwin 136 (226); Calum Haggett 4/94 (33 overs)		135 (46.5 overs); Rob Key 23 (43); Michael Hogan 3/42 (16 overs)
		489/9d (142 overs) (f/o); Darren Stevens 119 (154); Dean Cosker 5/120 (50 overs)

Match drawn
St Lawrence Ground, Canterbury
Umpires: Steve Garratt and Neil Mallender

- Glamorgan won the toss and chose to bat.
- Points: Glamorgan 9, Kent 5.

20–23 June
Scorecard

Northamptonshire	v	Lancashire (H)
62 (29.5 overs); Steven Crook 16 (22); Kyle Hogg 7/27 (14.5 overs)		159 (58 overs); Tom Smith 35* (77); Azharullah 4/42 (17 overs)
169 (65.2 overs); Andrew Hall 55 (115); Luke Procter 4/39 (12 overs)		73/2 (21 overs); Ashwell Prince 38 (54); David Willey 1/10 (4 overs)

Lancashire won by 8 wickets
Old Trafford, Manchester
Umpires: Paul Baldwin and Richard Illingworth

- Lancashire won the toss and chose to field.
- Points: Lancashire 19, Northamptonshire 3.

20–23 June
Scorecard

(H) Worcestershire	v	Glamorgan
505/7d (138 overs); Moeen Ali 250 (367); Dean Cosker 4/68 (18 overs)		277 (74 overs); Jim Allenby 82 (107); Jack Shantry 4/65 (18 overs)
51/2 (9.5 overs); Daryl Mitchell 22(22); Marcus North 1/5 (0.5 overs)		278 (79.1 overs) (f/o); Jim Allenby 74* (92); Jack Shantry 4/77 (23 overs)

Worcestershire won by 8 wickets
County Ground, New Road, Worcester
Umpires: Martin Bodenham and Michael Gough

- Glamorgan won the toss and chose to field.
- Points: Worcestershire 23, Glamorgan 3.

21–24 June
Scorecard

(H) Leicestershire	v	Essex
302 (104.4 overs); Niall O'Brien 67 (143); Graham Napier 7/90 (30.4 overs)		356 (104.1 overs); James Foster 143 (190); Matthew Hoggard 6/66 (29 overs)
214 (81.5 overs); Jigar Naik 47* (141); Ryan ten Doeschate 4/28 (14 overs)		161/6 (36.2 overs); James Foster 42 (28); Alex Wyatt 3/35 (13 overs)

Essex won by 4 wickets
Grace Road, Leicester
Umpires: Trevor Jesty and Martin Saggers

- Leicestershire won the toss and chose to bat.
- Points: Essex 23, Leicestershire 6.

==== July ====
8–11 July
Scorecard

Hampshire	v	Glamorgan (H)
341 (122.5 overs); James Vince 80 (131); Michael Hogan 3/48 (29 overs)		300/6d (98.5 overs); Gareth Rees 112 (271); Sohail Tanvir 3/62 (21 overs)
179 (67.3 overs); Neil McKenzie 67 (133); Marcus North 5/30 (15.1 overs)		177 (68 overs); Murray Goodwin 56*; James Tomlinson 5/44 (18 overs)

Hampshire won by 43 runs
SWALEC Stadium, Cardiff
Umpires: Tim Robinson and Chettithody Shamshuddin

- Hampshire won the toss and elected to bat.
- Points: Hampshire 21, Glamorgan 5.

8–11 July
Scorecard

(H) Northamptonshire	v	Lancashire
310 (111.1 overs); Cameron White 90 (198); Kyle Hogg 4/65 (25.1 overs)		442 (137.2 overs); Simon Katich 200 (322); David Willey 5/108 (35 overs)
241 (85 overs); James Middlebrook 75 (171); Simon Kerrigan 7/63 (30 overs)		110/2 (30.3 overs); Andrea Agathangelou 57* (75); James Middlebrook 1/23 (11 overs)

Lancashire won by 8 wickets
County Ground, Northampton
Umpires: Jeff Evans and Trevor Jesty

- Lancashire won the toss and elected to field.
- Points: Lancashire 23, Northamptonshire 5.

10–13 July
Scorecard

(H) Gloucestershire	v	Kent
562/5d (140.5 overs); Chris Dent 153 (270); Calum Haggett 3/87 (22 overs)		389/5d (100.3 overs); Ben Harmison 101* (141); Tom Smith 2/125 (37 overs)
237/1d (41.5 overs); Michael Klinger 102* (123); Sam Northeast 1/60 (14 overs)		411/8 (93.4 overs); Brendan Nash 199 (230); Craig Miles 4/72 (17.4 overs)

Kent won by 2 wickets
College Ground, Cheltenham
Umpires: Steve Garratt and Steve O'Shaughnessy

- Gloucestershire won the toss and elected to bat.
- Points: Kent 21, Gloucestershire 6.

15–18 July
Scorecard

Hampshire	v	Kent (H)
405/9d (134.2 overs); Michael Carberry 154 (295); James Tredwell 3/83 (27.2 overs)		513 (141.2 overs); Rob Key 180 (285); James Tomlinson 3/72 (27 overs)
200/4d (87 overs); Liam Dawson 78* (166); James Tredwell 3/87 (35 overs)

Match drawn
St Lawrence Ground, Canterbury
Umpires: Stephen Gale and Ian Gould

- Hampshire won the toss and elected to bat.
- Adam Rouse (Hants) made his first-class debut.
- Points: Kent 8, Hampshire 7.

15–18 July
Scorecard

Glamorgan	v	Lancashire (H)
474 (150.1 overs); Murray Goodwin 194 (354); Simon Kerrigan 7/162 (49.1 overs)		567 (164.4 overs); Simon Katich 115 (237); Nathan McCullum 5/191 (47.4 overs)
183/5 (60 overs); Gareth Rees 107* (169); Simon Kerrigan 5/90 (27 overs)

Match drawn
Old Trafford, Manchester
Umpires: Mark Benson and Alex Wharf

- Glamorgan won the toss and elected to bat.
- Arron Lilley (Lancs) made his first-class debut.
- Points: Glamorgan 8, Lancashire 7.

17–20 July
Scorecard

Leicestershire	v	Essex (H)
365 (114.3 overs); Ned Eckersley 147 (277); Graham Napier 5/77 (20.3 overs)		521 (150.1 overs); Jaik Mickleburgh 243 (434); James Sykes 4/176 (43 overs)
131 (43.3 overs); Ollie Freckingham 24 (24); Greg Smith 5/42 (17.3 overs)

Essex won by an innings and 25 runs
County Ground, Chelmsford
Umpires: David Millns and Chettithody Shamshuddin

- Leicestershire won the toss and elected to bat.
- James Sykes (Leics) made his first-class debut.
- Points: Essex 21, Leicestershire 5.

17–20 July
Scorecard

Worcestershire	v	Gloucestershire (H)
182 (71 overs); Joe Leach 82* (176); James Fuller 5/43 (19 overs)		326 (99.5 overs); Chris Dent 79 (114); Gareth Andrew 3/56 (16 overs)
337 (122.4 overs); Joe Leach 114 (170); Tom Smith 4/91 (35.4 overs)		195/4 (46.1 overs); Michael Klinger 92 (131); Graeme Cessford 2/35 (7.1 overs)

Gloucestershire won by 6 wickets
College Ground, Cheltenham
Umpires: Neil Bainton and Neil Mallender

- Worcestershire won the toss and elected to bat.
- Points: Gloucestershire 22, Worcestershire 3.

==== August ====
2–5 August
Scorecard

(H) Hampshire	v	Glamorgan
349 (115 overs); Michael Carberry 94 (177); Michael Hogan 4/90 (27 overs)		478/9d (120 overs); Chris Cooke 92 (153); Chris Wood 3/61 (22 overs)
237/4 (80.2 overs); Chris Wood 69 (138); Graham Wagg 2/20 (15.2 overs)

Match drawn
The Rose Bowl, Southampton
Umpires: Neil Mallender and Peter Willey

- Glamorgan won the toss and elected to field.
- Points: Glamorgan 11, Hampshire 8.

2–5 August
Scorecard

Lancashire	v	Leicestershire (H)
380 (117 overs); Luis Reece 85 (160); Ollie Freckingham 4/85 (22 overs)		154 (70.1 overs); Niall O'Brien 41 (79); Greg Smith 3/35 (17 overs)
		174 (62.1 overs) (f/o); Niall O'Brien 50 (64); Kyle Hogg 5/77 (22 overs)

Lancashire won by an innings and 52 runs
Grace Road, Leicester
Umpires: Mike Burns and Jeff Evans

- Lancashire won the toss and elected to bat.
- Tom Wells (Leics) made his first-class debut.
- Points: Lancashire 23, Leicestershire 2.

2–5 August
Scorecard

Gloucestershire	v	Northamptonshire (H)
358 (91.2 overs); Hamish Marshall 145 (197); Andrew Hall 3/59 (18 overs)		567/4d (142.3 overs); David Sales 255* (279); Benny Howell 1/53 (14 overs)
227/1 (73 overs); Chris Dent 129* (212); Cameron White 1/36 (13 overs)

Match drawn
County Ground, Northampton
Umpires: Paul Baldwin and Martin Saggers

- Gloucestershire won the toss and elected to bat.
- Tom Shrewsbury (Glos) made his first-class debut.
- Points: Northamptonshire 11, Gloucestershire 8.

2–5 August
Scorecard

Kent	v	Worcestershire (H)
324 (95.5 overs); Ben Harmison 96 (220); Jack Shantry 3/69 (22.5 overs)		284/8 (95 overs); Tom Fell 94* (162); James Tredwell 5/51 (21 overs)

Match drawn
County Ground, New Road, Worcester
Umpires: Rob Bailey and Michael Gough

- Worcestershire won the toss and elected to field.
- Points: Worcestershire 8, Kent 8.

20–23 August
Scorecard

Northamptonshire	v	Essex (H)
531 (145.5 overs); David Sales 131 (201); Greg Smith 3/86 (19.5 overs)		396 (109 overs); Ryan ten Doeschate 103 (144); James Middlebrook 3/79 (24 overs)
54/0d (13.4 overs); James Middlebrook 32* (51)

Match drawn
Castle Park Cricket Ground, Colchester
Umpires: Nick Cook and Steve Garratt

- Northamptonshire won the toss and elected to bat.
- No play on day 3 due to rain.
- Points: Northamptonshire 10, Essex 8.

21–24 August
Scorecard

Leicestershire	v	Glamorgan (H)
203 (77.5 overs); Greg Smith 40 (57); Michael Hogan 5/43 (19 overs)		508/9d (121.3 overs); Murray Goodwin 178 (316); Ben Raine 4/98 (23 overs)
268 (88.5 overs); Ned Eckersley 76 (174); Dean Cosker 4/88 (34 overs)

Glamorgan won by an innings and 37 runs
St Helen's, Swansea
Umpires: Jeff Evans and Nigel Llong

- Leicestershire won the toss and elected to bat.
- Points: Glamorgan 24, Leicestershire 3.

21–24 August
Scorecard

(H) Kent	v	Gloucestershire
474 (129.5 overs); Darren Stevens 126 (166); Liam Norwell 3/104 (22 overs)		80/0d (28 overs); Chris Dent 44* (98)
4/0d (3.1 overs); Rob Key 2* (8)		307/9 (106 overs); Gareth Roderick 152* (252); Charlie Shreck 4/65 (25 overs)

Match drawn
St Lawrence Ground, Canterbury
Umpires: Neil Bainton and David Millns

- Kent won the toss and elected to bat.
- No play on day 4 due to rain.
- Points: Kent 7, Gloucestershire 5.

22–25 August
Scorecard

(H) Worcestershire	v	Lancashire
287 (92.1 overs); Moeen Ali 104 (205); Kyle Hogg 4/57 (21.1 overs)		441 (109.2 overs); Simon Katich 105 (91); Graeme Cessford 4/73 (16.2 overs)
241 (70.4 overs); Moeen Ali 109 (151); Tom Smith 3/40 (12.4 overs)		90/1 (19 overs); Luis Reece 56* (51); Graeme Cessford 1/39 (7 overs)

Lancashire won by 9 wickets
County Ground, New Road, Worcester
Umpires: Nigel Cowley and Steve O'Shaughnessy

- Lancashire won the toss and elected to field.
- Points: Lancashire 24, Worcestershire 5.

28–31 August
Scorecard

Essex	v	Gloucestershire (H)
400 (108.2 overs); Greg Smith 177 (303); David Payne 3/75 (23 overs)		254 (68.2 overs); Alex Gidman 63 (93); Graham Napier 4/77 (23.2 overs)
285/4d (61 overs); Gautam Gambhir 106 (149); Tom Smith 2/61 (10 overs)		355/6 (104.3 overs); Gareth Roderick 136 (199); Reece Topley 3/70 (25 overs)

Match drawn
County Ground, Bristol
Umpires: Nigel Cowley and Peter Hartley

- Gloucestershire won the toss and elected to field.
- Points: Essex 11, Gloucestershire 8.

28–31 August
Scorecard

(H) Lancashire	v	Hampshire
421 (120.1 overs); Luke Procter 66 (152); James Tomlinson 3/91 (30 overs)		210 (59.5 overs); James Vince 106 (145); Kyle Hogg 5/39 (14 overs)
284/5d (56 overs); Paul Horton 111 (154); Brad Taylor 4/64 (14 overs)		373 (108.5 overs); Adam Wheater 140 (232); Simon Kerrigan 4/97 (37.5 overs)

Lancashire won by 122 runs
Trafalgar Road Ground, Southport
Umpires: Neil Bainton and Jeremy Lloyds

- Lancashire won the toss and elected to bat.
- Brad Taylor (Hants) made his first-class debut.
- Points: Lancashire 23, Hampshire 4.

28–31 August
Scorecard

(H) Leicestershire	v	Worcestershire
274 (100.2 overs); Ned Eckersley 106 (249); Alan Richardson 5/57 (24.2 overs)		338 (110.5 overs); Thilan Samaraweera 144* (262); Matthew Hoggard 4/62 (26 overs)
248 (100.2 overs); Ned Eckersley 119 (224); Jack Shantry 4/53 (24.2 overs)		185/1 (45.1 overs); Matthew Pardoe 76* (126); Matthew Hoggard 1/32 (11 overs)

Worcestershire won by 9 wickets
Grace Road, Leicester
Umpires: Steve Garratt and Trevor Jesty

- Leicestershire won the toss and elected to bat.
- Points: Worcestershire 22, Leicestershire 5.

28–30 August
Scorecard

Glamorgan	v	Northamptonshire (H)
241 (72.4 overs); Murray Goodwin 47 (67); Steven Crook 4/66 (18 overs)		453 (114.5 overs); Andrew Hall 91* (134); Michael Reed 4/109 (26 overs)
187 (61.5 overs); Will Bragg 44 (107); Trent Copeland 3/41 (19 overs)

Northamptonshire won by an innings and 25 runs
County Ground, Northampton
Umpires: Mark Benson and Neil Mallender

- Northamptonshire won the toss and elected to field.
- Points: Northamptonshire 24, Glamorgan 4.

==== September ====
3–5 September
Scorecard

Worcestershire	v	Essex (H)
102 (45.3 overs); Joe Leach 24 (48); Reece Topley 6/29 (18 overs)		351 (89.2 overs); Greg Smith 94 (119); Alan Richardson 4/92 (26 overs)
299 (91.2 overs); Matthew Pardoe 88 (188); Reece Topley 5/56 (19.2 overs)		53/2 (18.1 overs); Jaik Mickleburgh 28 (44); Shaaiq Choudhry 2/7 (4 overs)

Essex won by 8 wickets
County Ground, Chelmsford
Umpires: Martin Bodenham and Peter Willey

- Worcestershire won the toss and elected to bat.
- Points: Essex 23, Worcestershire 3.

3–5 September
Scorecard

(H) Glamorgan	v	Kent
158 (60 overs); Ben Wright 55 (103); Darren Stevens 4/34 (15 overs)		175 (61.3 overs); Daniel Bell-Drummond 78 (166); Michael Hogan 6/65 (18.3 overs)
258 (77.5 overs); Gareth Rees 52 (104); Adam Riley 3/69 (15.5 overs)		242/3 (72.2 overs); Sam Northeast 88 (209); Dean Cosker 2/34 (17 overs)

Kent won by 7 wickets
SWALEC Stadium, Cardiff
Umpires: Nick Cook and George Sharp

- Glamorgan won the toss and elected to bat.
- Ruaidhri Smith (Glam) made his first-class debut.
- Points: Kent 19, Glamorgan 3.

3–5 September
Scorecard

Leicestershire	v	Gloucestershire (H)
117 (41.2 overs); Greg Smith 54 (83); Will Gidman 6/15 (14 overs)		516/9d (130.3 overs); Will Gidman 143 (183); Shiv Thakor 2/49 (12 overs)
261 (86.5 overs); Ned Eckersley 84 (103); Will Gidman 4/28 (10.5 overs)

Gloucestershire won by an innings and 138 runs
County Ground, Bristol
Umpires: Stephen Gale and Michael Gough

- Gloucestershire won the toss and elected to field.
- Matthew Taylor (Glos) and Angus Robson (Leics) made their first-class debuts.
- Points: Gloucestershire 24, Leicestershire 2.

3–6 September
Scorecard

Northamptonshire	v	Hampshire (H)
438 (129 overs); Rob Keogh 221 (383); Ruel Brathwaite 3/112 (26 overs)		545 (160.4 overs); James Adams 218 (444); Azharullah 3/69 (26.4 overs)
135/3d 135 (51.5 overs); David Sales 66* (137); Liam Dawson 1/6 (7 overs)

Match drawn
The Rose Bowl, Southampton
Umpires: Steve O'Shaughnessy and Martin Saggers

- Hampshire won the toss and elected to field.
- Points: Hampshire 8, Northamptonshire 8.

11–14 September
Scorecard

Essex	v	Kent (H)
276 (110.3 overs); Owais Shah 84 (192); Mark Davies 4/67 (24.3 overs)		107 (49 overs); Ben Harmison 30* (94); David Masters 6/41 (18 overs)
		215/7 (72 overs) (f/o); Sam Northeast 70 (136); Monty Panesar 4/49 (20 overs)

Match drawn
St Lawrence Ground, Canterbury
Umpires: Jeremy Lloyds and Neil Mallender

- Kent won the toss and elected to field.
- Points: Essex 8, Kent 6.

11–14 September
Scorecard

(H) Lancashire	v	Leicestershire
453/7d (115 overs); Paul Horton 156 (268); Ned Eckersley 2/29 (5 overs)		329 (104.1 overs); Ben Raine 72 (162); Kyle Hogg 3/52 (23 overs)

Match drawn
Old Trafford, Manchester
Umpires: David Millns and George Sharp

- Leicestershire won the toss and elected to field.
- Points: Lancashire 11, Leicestershire 8.

11–14 September
Scorecard

Hampshire	v	Worcestershire (H)
428 (110.4 overs); James Vince 106 (149); Alan Richardson 4/69 (34 overs)		351/8d (103.4 overs); Ben Cox 65 (113); James Tomlinson 4/85 (28 overs)
69/2d (20.1 overs); James Adams 22* (53); Moeen Ali 1/9 (6.1 overs)

Match drawn
County Ground, New Road, Worcester
Umpires: Mike Burns and Nigel Cowley

- Worcestershire won the toss and elected to field.
- Points: Worcestershire 10, Hampshire 10.

17–20 September
Scorecard

Glamorgan	v	Essex (H)
322 (108.1 overs); Chris Cooke 67 (106); David Masters 5/68 (36 overs)		424/6d (89 overs); Jaik Mickleburgh 129 (203); Ruaidhri Smith 3/106 (18 overs)
181/2d (44 overs); Gareth Rees 76 (112); Graham Napier 2/49 (11 overs)

Match drawn
County Ground, Chelmsford
Umpires: Jeff Evans and Steve O'Shaughnessy

- Essex won the toss and elected to field.
- Points: Essex 11, Glamorgan 8.

17–20 September
Scorecard

Lancashire	v	Gloucestershire (H)
310/8d (114 overs); Luke Procter 106 (227); Will Gidman 5/61 (28 overs)		209 (54.4 overs); Alex Gidman 45 (66); Tom Smith 4/49 (12 overs)
195/2d (46.3 overs); Luis Reece 97 (133); David Payne 1/53 (11.3 overs)

Match drawn
County Ground, Bristol
Umpires: Mark Benson and Peter Willey

- Gloucestershire won the toss and elected to field.
- Points: Lancashire 9, Gloucestershire 6.

17–20 September
Scorecard

Hampshire	v	Leicestershire (H)
364/2d (97.3 overs); James Vince 147* (174); Shiv Thakor 1/32 (10 overs)		Innings forfeited
Innings forfeited		184 (43.2 overs); Tom Wells 82 (77); Matt Coles 5/75 (17 overs)

Hampshire won by 180 runs
Grace Road, Leicester
Umpires: Martin Bodenham and Michael Gough

- Leicestershire won the toss and elected to field.
- No play on day 1 due to rain.
- Points: Hampshire 20, Leicestershire 0.

17–20 September
Scorecard

Kent	v	Northamptonshire (H)
418 (112 overs); Brendan Nash 107 (152); James Middlebrook 6/78 (20 overs)		431/5d (122.4 overs); David Sales 110 (192); Charlie Shreck 2/80 (26 overs)

Match drawn
County Ground, Northampton
Umpires: Neil Bainton and Nigel Cowley

- Northamptonshire won the toss and elected to field.
- Points: Northamptonshire 10, Kent 9.

24–27 September
Scorecard

Gloucestershire	v	Glamorgan (H)
275 (104.3 overs); Chris Dent 84 (149); Jim Allenby 3/31 (19.3 overs)		306 (77.4 overs); Jim Allenby 85 (117); Will Gidman 4/64 (18 overs)
132 (44.3 overs); Alex Gidman 26 (30); Jim Allenby 4/16 (10.3 overs)		102/2 (30.3 overs); Murray Goodwin 50* (109); Will Gidman 2/9 (7 overs)

Glamorgan won by 8 wickets
SWALEC Stadium, Cardiff
Umpires: Rob Bailey and Steve Garratt

- Glamorgan won the toss and elected to field.
- No play on day 3 due to rain.
- Points: Glamorgan 22, Gloucestershire 5.

24–26 September
Scorecard

(H) Hampshire	v	Essex
456 (106 overs); Adam Wheater 122 (122); Greg Smith 5/58 (19 overs)		207 (59.1 overs); Tom Westley 40 (72); Matt Coles 6/71 (19.1 overs)
		218 (57.5 overs) (f/o); Graham Napier 53 (60); James Tomlinson 4/63 (19 overs)

Hampshire won by an innings and 31 runs
The Rose Bowl, Southampton
Umpires: Trevor Jesty and Richard Kettleborough

- Essex won the toss and elected to field.
- Kishen Velani (Essex) made his first-class debut.
- Points: Hampshire 24, Essex 4.

24–27 September
Scorecard

Lancashire	v	Kent (H)
284 (103.1 overs); Ashwell Prince 134 (284); Mark Davies 2/41 (23 overs)		260 (62.3 overs); Rob Key 134 (162); Stephen Parry 3/51 (11.3 overs)
393/5d (104.4 overs); Ashwell Prince 108 (194); Darren Stevens 2/80 (24 overs)		418/8 (91.4 overs); Darren Stevens 205* (218); Oliver Newby 3/55 (13.4 overs)

Kent won by 2 wickets
St Lawrence Ground, Canterbury
Umpires: Neil Bainton and Nick Cook

- Kent won the toss and elected to field.
- Matt Hunn (Kent) made his first-class debut.
- Points: Kent 21, Lancashire 5.

24–26 September
Scorecard

(H) Worcestershire	v	Northamptonshire
163 (57.4 overs); Jack Shantry 55* (74); Andrew Hall 5/30 (14.4 overs)		202 (74.2 overs); Rob Keogh 57 (152); Alan Richardson 5/70 (26 overs)
295 (96 overs); Ross Whiteley 56 (76); James Middlebrook 4/110 (39 overs)		141 (48.2 overs); Andrew Hall 27 (59); Shaaiq Choudhry 3/28 (12.2 overs)

Worcestershire won by 115 runs
County Ground, New Road, Worcester
Umpires: Peter Hartley and George Sharp

- Northamptonshire won the toss and elected to field.
- Points: Worcestershire 19, Northamptonshire 4.

== Statistics ==
=== Division One ===
==== Most runs ====
Player	Team	Matches	Innings	Runs	Average	HS	100s	50s
Gary Ballance	Yorkshire	14	21	1,251	62.55	148	5	6
Wayne Madsen	Derbyshire	16	30	1,221	43.60	152	3	8
Sam Robson	Middlesex	16	29	1,180	47.20	215*	3	4
Ed Joyce	Sussex	14	21	1,118	65.76	204*	2	6
Chris Nash	Sussex	16	27	1,072	44.66	167*	3	3

==== Most wickets ====
Player	Team	Matches	Overs	Wickets	Average	BBI	5W
Graham Onions	Durham	12	419.1	70	18.45	7/62	5
Steve Magoffin	Sussex	15	496.0	63	21.49	8/20	3
Tim Murtagh	Middlesex	13	444.1	60	20.40	6/49	3
Chris Jordan	Sussex	14	435.3	59	26.72	6/48	4
Chris Rushworth	Durham	14	402.2	54	22.25	6/58	3

=== Division Two ===
==== Most runs ====
Player	Team	Matches	Innings	Runs	Average	HS	100s	50s
Moeen Ali	Worcestershire	16	27	1,375	62.50	250	4	8
Ned Eckersley	Leicestershire	16	27	1,275	53.12	147	4	4
Darren Stevens	Kent	15	21	1,268	63.40	205*	4	7
Murray Goodwin	Glamorgan	16	26	1,263	57.40	194	4	7
Ashwell Prince	Lancashire	16	26	1,169	48.70	134	3	7

==== Most wickets ====
Player	Team	Matches	Overs	Wickets	Average	BBI	5W
Alan Richardson	Worcestershire	16	541.4	69	19.82	8/37	5
Michael Hogan	Glamorgan	14	512.0	67	20.53	7/92	4
Kyle Hogg	Lancashire	15	436.0	60	18.41	7/27	3
Simon Kerrigan	Lancashire	13	461.2	57	20.89	7/63	5
Glen Chapple	Lancashire	14	430.4	53	20.73	5/9	2
