= Gareth Cross =

English cricketer (born 1984)

Personal information
- Full name: Gareth David Cross
- Born: 20 June 1984 (age 42); Bury, England
- Height: 5 ft 9 in (1.75 m)
- Batting: Right-handed
- Bowling: Right-arm medium-fast
- Role: Wicketkeeper

Domestic team information
- Years: Team
- 2005–2013: Lancashire
- 2014: Cheshire
- 2014: Derbyshire
- 2016–2022: Clifton

Career statistics
Competition	FC	LA	T20
Matches	62	80	87
Runs scored	2,196	1,071	866
Batting average	24.67	20.59	16.65
100s/50s	3/11	0/3	0/2
Top score	125	76	65*
Balls bowled	–	36	–
Wickets	–	2	–
Bowling average	–	13.00	–
5 wickets in innings	–	0	–
10 wickets in match	–	0	–
Best bowling	–	2/26	–
Catches/stumpings	155/23	61/26	54/22
- Source: Cricinfo, 4 May 2014

Gareth David Cross (born 20 June 1984) is an English cricketer who plays as a right-handed batsman and wicket-keeper who occasionally bowls right arm medium-fast. He played for Lancashire from 2005 until his release in 2013, and the following year signed for Derbyshire. In 2015 he returned to Clifton as professional having earlier come through their junior ranks.

Cross was born in Bury, Greater Manchester, and briefly started his cricket at Roe Green Cricket Club in Worsley, before moving to Clifton Salford. Cross made his first-class debut in 2005. Lancashire's stalwart wicketkeeper Warren Hegg retired at the end of the season, and the signing of Luke Sutton in the off-season limited Cross' first-team opportunities. Despite the competition he established himself as a regular in the one-day side, although he struggled to break into the County Championship team.

In 2009 Cross captained the Second XI, leading them to the semi-final of the Second XI Trophy. Sutton left in late 2010, leaving Cross as Lancashire's first-choice wicketkeeper. He was part of the Lancashire squad that won the 2011 County Championship and achieved the rare feat of being ever-present in a championship winning side, but left the club at the end of the 2013 season and after a short time with Cheshire in early 2014 signed to play for Derbyshire.

== Career ==
Cross made his debut for the Second XI a week and a half before his 18th birthday, in a game against Durham. He continued to play List A cricket for three years prior to his first-class debut.

Having graduated from Lancashire's Academy, 2005 was Cross' first year with the senior squad. Lancashire's veteran wicket-keeper Hegg was impressed by Cross, and said "He has a really good work ethic, and he listens when you talk about the game. He's the one in line to take over from me." Cross made his first-class debut on 25 May 2005, along with Steven Croft and Tom Smith in a match against Oxford University. He batted just once in the match, scoring two runs, although he dismissed five batsmen, one by stumping and four caught. His second opportunity to play first-class cricket came in the last match of the season; with Lancashire's stalwart Warren Hegg injured, Cross was given the responsibility of taking over as wicket-keeper. Playing in the County Championship for the first time, according to The Wisden Cricketer Cross "showed enough pure technique to deserve his chance to develop". Although Hegg retired at the end of the season, Lancashire quickly signed experienced wicket-keeper Luke Sutton from Derbyshire, hampering Cross' chances to regularly play first-team cricket. In the 2005/06 Australian cricket season, Cross travelled to the southern hemisphere to play for St Kilda Cricket Club in the Victorian Premier Cricket. He spent most of the season playing for the club's second team.

Having won the second division title in 2005, for the 2006 season Lancashire were playing in the first division of the County Championship. A successful first season for Sutton – in which he broke the record for highest score by a Lancashire 'keeper and had a batting average of 61 – meant that Cross spent most of 2006 playing for the Second XI. However, he was given a chance in the first team when Luke Sutton broke his thumb in July. Cross played three Championship matches before Sutton returned, managing half-centuries against Kent and Sussex. This was the season that Cross made his Twenty20 (T20) debut; he played eight matches for Lancashire, scoring 61 runs at an average of 8.71 with a highest score of 36. Lancashire were runners-up in the Championship and C&G Trophy, although went out in the first round of the T20 Cup.

Spanning the 2007 and 2008 seasons, Cross's first-class experience was limited to two matches, one at the start of each season against Durham University. However, Cross regularly featured in Lancashire's one-day side. Sutton did not play a single T20 match in the 2007 season, so Cross kept wicket in his place. During the same season, he also opened the batting a few times in the 40-over competition as a specialist batsman. In six T20 matches, Cross scored 113 runs at an average of 22.60 with a highest score of 62, his first half-century in T20 cricket; he also dismissed seven people, four caught and three stumped. An attacking batsman, Cross showcased his batting ability in an innings of 76 off 69 balls against Warwickshire in a Pro40 match to help Lancashire to victory. It was Cross' maiden half-century for Lancashire in list A cricket, beating his previous highest score of 36. Lancashire-batsman Mal Loye identified Cross as a talented cricketer with the potential to play for England, remarking that "His natural ability is just unbelievable".

Relative to 2007, Cross had less impact in 2008. Although he played more list A cricket, he scored fewer runs than in the previous year. He played eleven T20 matches, scoring 97 runs at an average of 24.25 and affecting eleven dismissals, seven caught and four stumped. In September, towards the end of the 2008 season, Cross was one of ten players from Lancashire's Development Programme to extend or sign contracts with the club. The group was expected to form the basis of the senior squad in the future.

Cross played for the St Kilda Saints in Australia as a batsman in the 2008/09 season. He won the prestigious Jack Ryder Medal, presented to the Player of the Year in Victorian Premier Cricket. During his stint with the club, Cross scored 541 runs at an average of 41, with a highest score of 111. Although primarily a batsman, Cross occasionally bowled, taking six wickets with best figures of 4/41. He was surprised to receive the award, and said that "This was my fourth spell with St Kilda and each time I've thoroughly enjoyed my cricket. I set myself a challenge this winter of focusing on my batting, improving my technique and doing my best for the club. Everything seemed to click and I was very happy with my own performance and that of the team. My focus now is to continue to do well during Lancashire's pre-season fixtures, and push for first team selection." Despite his promising winter, Cross was less successful in the 2009 season than desired: he did not play any first-class cricket and scored fewer runs in the one-day competitions than hoped. However, Cross captained Lancashire's second XI and was a regular in their top order. Under his leadership, the team progressed to the final of the Second XI Championship and the semi-final of the Second XI Trophy.

Two years after he last played a first-class match, Cross returned to the County Championship team in July 2010. With Luke Sutton acting as wicket-keeper and batting at seven, Cross played as a specialist batsman. Playing against Hampshire, he batted at six; he scored his maiden century, beating his previous best score of 70, to help Lancashire draw. Cross was reprimanded in August for showing dissent in a second XI match. Sutton left the club towards the end of the season, and Cross was expected to take the position of Lancashire's first-choice wicketkeeper.

At the start of 2011, Cross was the only wicket-keeper with a first-team contract at Lancashire. The club had a small squad, just 19 players at the start of the season and choosing to place their trust in young local players, which led some pundits to declare that Lancashire would be fighting to avoid relegation form the County Championship. Speaking in March of his aims for the coming season, Cross stated that "if I got below 700 runs from No.7, I'd be really disappointed". During a match against Sussex in April 2011, Cross beat his highest score in first-class cricket. His innings of 125 came from 195 balls. During a match against Nottinghamshire in June, Cross reached the landmark of 1,000 first-class runs in his career. In the last match of the season, Lancashire won the County Championship first the first time since 1950 when they shared the title. Cross played in all 16 of Lancashire's County Championship matches, scoring 557 runs, taking 46 catches, and effecting 10 stumpings.

The year after winning the County Championship, Lancashire were relegated to the second division. Cross played in all 16 of Lancashire's Championship matches that year, scoring 547 runs including three haljf-centuries, with a highest score of 74 not out. Cross scored his third first-class century during a drawn match against Hampshire in May 2013, his first in two years. Though Lancashire secured immediate promotion back to the first division of the Championship through winning the second division title, Cross was dropped for the final two matches of the season as Alex Davies was preferred to keep wicket. In September, after scoring 409 runs from 13 Championship matches that year, Cross was released from his contract with the club.

=== Derbyshire ===
After being released by Lancashire, Cross signed to play for 2013 Minor Counties Championship winners Cheshire. As well as playing for Nantwich at the same time, Cross had a trial with Derbyshire in April 2014. Consequently, when the club's contracted wicketkeepers – Tom Poynton and Richard Johnson – became unavailable to play Cross was signed to from May until the end of the season.
