= Ollie Freckingham =

English cricketer

Personal information
- Full name: Oliver Henry Freckingham
- Born: 12 November 1988 (age 38); Oakham, Rutland, England
- Batting: Right-handed
- Bowling: Right-arm medium-fast
- Role: Bowler

Domestic team information
- Years: Team
- 2013–2016: Leicestershire (squad no. 24)
- FC debut: 10 April 2013 Leics v Hampshire
- LA debut: 14 August 2014 Leics v Worcestershire

Career statistics
Competition	FC	LA	T20
Matches	23	5	5
Runs scored	296	11	4
Batting average	11.38	11.00	–
100s/50s	0/0	0/0	0/0
Top score	34*	5*	4*
Balls bowled	3,671	246	84
Wickets	65	5	4
Bowling average	37.93	62.40	30.25
5 wickets in innings	2	0	0
10 wickets in match	0	0	0
Best bowling	6/125	2/38	2/21
Catches/stumpings	4/–	2/–	0/–
- Source: CricketArchive, 5 April 2017

Oliver Henry Freckingham (born 12 November 1988) is an English first-class cricketer. He was born at Oakham and played for Leicestershire County Cricket Club as a right arm fast-medium bowler and right-handed batsman.

Freckingham first played for Leicestershire's Second XI in 2010. He has played league cricket for Loughborough Town.

Freckingham signed a one-year contract with Leicestershire in September 2012 to play in the 2013 County Championship season. He made his debut in the season opener against Hampshire at The Rose Bowl taking 3/100 in his first innings. He became a regular in Leicestershire's County Championship side and in his fifth game took 6/125, and had match figures of 9/188 against Northamptonshire.

After being Leicestershire's leading wicket-taker during the 2013 season, Freckingham signed a new two-year deal in October 2013.

== Personal life ==
Freckingham plays golf to a good standard and before he joined Leicestershire full-time, worked as a shop manager at Rutland County Golf Club.
