= Cameron Herring =

Welsh cricketer

Personal information
- Full name: Cameron Lee Herring
- Born: 15 July 1994 (age 32); Abergavenny, Monmouthshire, Wales
- Batting: Right-handed
- Role: Wicket-keeper

Domestic team information
- Years: Team
- 2013–2015: Gloucestershire (squad no. 29)
- 2016: Glamorgan

Career statistics
Competition	FC	LA	T20
Matches	13	1	4
Runs scored	294	6	55
Batting average	21.14	6.00	27.50
100s/50s	1/0	0/0	0/0
Top score	114*	6	23*
Catches/stumpings	35/1	2/0	1/1
- Source: CricketArchive, 1 April 2017

Cameron Lee Herring (born 15 July 1994) is a Welsh cricketer. Herring is a right-handed batsman who plays as a wicket-keeper. He was born at Abergavenny, Monmouthshire.

Herring made his first-class debut for Gloucestershire in their first County Championship match of the 2013 season against Essex. In a match which was drawn following poor weather, Herring wasn't required to bat, but did make his first dismissal from behind the stumps when he caught Tom Westley off the bowling of Will Gidman. He went on to make a total of 5 appearances in the County Championship in 2013, but is yet to make his debut in limited overs cricket. He was contracted with Gloucestershire from the 2014 season, but was released at the end of the 2015 season after not playing any first-class cricket that summer.

== Career best performances ==
as of 6 October 2015

	Batting			
	Score	Fixture	Venue	Season
FC	114*	Gloucestershire v Cardiff MCCU	Bristol	2014
