= Graeme Cessford =

English cricketer (born 1983)

Graeme Cessford (born 4 October 1983 in Hexham) is an English cricketer active in 2013 who plays for Worcestershire. He has appeared in six first-class matches as a righthanded batsman who bowls right arm fast medium. He has scored 45 runs with a highest score of 20 and taken 17 wickets with a best performance of four for 73.

By the 16th of July 2021 Cessford's cricket career had fallen to playing in the South Northants village league <https://snorthantslge.play-cricket.com/home>
