= Matthew Pardoe =

English cricketer (born 1991)

Personal information
- Full name: Mathew Graham Pardoe
- Born: 5 January 1991 (age 35); Stourbridge, West Midlands, England
- Batting: Left-handed
- Bowling: Left-arm medium
- Role: Batsman

Domestic team information
- Years: Team
- 2011–2014: Worcestershire (squad no. 19)
- 2012/13–2012/14: Southern Rocks
- 2015–: Herefordshire
- FC debut: 8 April 2011 Worcestershire v Yorkshire
- LA debut: 17 May 2011 Worcestershire v Middlesex

Career statistics
Competition	FC	LA	T20
Matches	56	5	1
Runs scored	2,291	118	1
Batting average	24.63	23.60	1.00
100s/50s	0/9	0/0	0/0
Top score	102	42	1
Balls bowled	299	18	–
Wickets	3	1	–
Bowling average	47.66	9	–
5 wickets in innings	0	0	–
10 wickets in match	0	0	–
Best bowling	2/34	1/9	–
Catches/stumpings	27/–	3/–	0/–
- Source: CricketArchive, 13 May 2022

Matthew Graham Pardoe (born 5 January 1991) is an English cricketer. A left-handed opening/middle order batsman, he played for Worcestershire.

In Birmingham league cricket, Pardoe plays for Kidderminster Victoria. He went to Haybridge High School and having progressed through Worcestershire's academy system and played for Worcestershire's Second XI, Pardoe made his first-class debut against Yorkshire at New Road, Worcester at the start of the 2011 season, scoring 26 and 0. In his second first-class match, against Warwickshire at New Road, he scored 54, his maiden first-class half-century. He went on to make his second half century against Nottinghamshire finishing on 74 before being caught off the bowling of Samit Patel.

Pardoe scored his maiden first-class century against Glamorgan in a county championship game in 2013 scoring 102 off 235 balls before being caught off the bowling of Dean Cosker.

He plays Minor Counties cricket for Herefordshire, and in 2017 was county captain. He is now a teacher at the Royal Grammar School, teaching Geography and is the Head of Cricket, as of the start of the 2026 academic year.
