= Ollie Rayner =

English cricketer

Personal information
- Full name: Oliver Philip Rayner
- Born: 1 November 1985 (age 41); Walsrode, Soltau-Fallingbostel, West Germany
- Nickname: Mervin, Rocket
- Height: 6 ft 5 in (1.96 m)
- Batting: Right-handed
- Bowling: Right-arm off break
- Role: Bowler

Domestic team information
- Years: Team
- 2006–2011: Sussex
- 2011: → Middlesex (on loan)
- 2011–2019: Middlesex (squad no. 2)
- 2018: → Hampshire (on loan)
- 2019: → Kent (on loan) (squad no. 2)
- FC debut: 18 May 2006 Sussex v Sri Lankans
- LA debut: 4 June 2006 Sussex v Kent

Career statistics
| Competition | FC | LA | T20 |
|---|---|---|---|
| Matches | 151 | 61 | 71 |
| Runs scored | 3,432 | 508 | 343 |
| Batting average | 20.30 | 22.08 | 12.70 |
| 100s/50s | 2/13 | 0/1 | 0/0 |
| Top score | 143* | 61 | 41* |
| Balls bowled | 22,509 | 2,346 | 1,323 |
| Wickets | 313 | 53 | 41 |
| Bowling average | 33.26 | 38.05 | 39.51 |
| 5 wickets in innings | 10 | 0 | 1 |
| 10 wickets in match | 1 | 0 | 0 |
| Best bowling | 8/46 | 4/35 | 5/18 |
| Catches/stumpings | 196/– | 32/– | 17/– |
- Source: ESPNcricinfo, 26 September 2019

Oliver Philip Rayner (born 1 November 1985) is an English former professional cricketer. He is a right-arm off break bowler and right-handed batsman who most recently played for Middlesex County Cricket Club. In May 2019, he was selected to represent the German cricket team. In March 2020, Rayner announced his retirement from cricket.

== Career ==
=== Sussex ===
Rayner represented the Sussex first-team since 2006, having been an occasional part of the Second XI team since his debut in 2002.

Rayner hit a century in the first match of his first-class career, against the touring Sri Lankan cricket team, becoming the first Sussex player to do so for 86 years. In spite of this strong start, the beginning of his County Championship career was shaky, though he put in an occasional good spell with the ball.

Generally speaking, Rayner occupied the lower order, while working on the reliability and consistency of his batting.

=== Middlesex ===
Rayner joined the Middlesex County Cricket Club on loan for the start of the 2011 season until mid-May. In August 2011, Rayner returned to Middlesex on loan for the remainder of the season. Rayner, then aged 25, hit 266 runs and took 11 wickets in eight County Championship games for Middlesex during 2011.

On 11 October, the all-rounder signed on a three-year deal after he impressed with his previous two loan spells.

In the 2013 season, Rayner took 46 wickets at an average of 22.0, lifting him into some discussion of landing a place in the England Lions cricket team.

On 21 January 2014, Rayner was called up to the England Lions Squad for the forthcoming tour of Sri Lanka. He replaced the injured Simon Kerrigan who would be monitored with the possibility of him joining the squad later on in the tour if his condition improved.

=== Germany ===
In February 2019, Rayner attended a training camp with the German national cricket team, with the view to help Germany qualify via the Regional Finals of the 2018–19 ICC World Twenty20 Europe Qualifier group for the 2020 ICC T20 World Cup. In May 2019, he was named in Germany's squad for the Regional Finals of the 2018–19 ICC T20 World Cup Europe Qualifier tournament in Guernsey.
