= Jamie Harrison =

English cricketer (born 1990)

Personal information
- Born: 19 November 1990 (age 35); Whiston, Merseyside, England
- Batting: Right-handed
- Bowling: Left-arm medium-fast

Domestic team information
- Years: Team
- 2012–2016: Durham (squad no. 13)

Career statistics
Competition	FC	LA	T20
Matches	18	6	1
Runs scored	436	8	–
Batting average	17.44	8.00	–
100s/50s	0/2	0/0	–
Top score	65	7*	–
Balls bowled	2,518	282	24
Wickets	52	8	2
Bowling average	30.25	36.87	23.50
5 wickets in innings	2	0	0
10 wickets in match	0	0	0
Best bowling	5/31	4/40	2/47
Catches/stumpings	0/–	0/–	0/–
- Source: CricketArchive, 5 April 2017

Jamie Harrison (born 19 November 1990) is an English cricketer. Harrison is a right-handed batsman who bowls left-arm medium-fast. He was born at Whiston, Merseyside, and was educated at Sedbergh School.

Having previously been part of Durham's cricket academy, Harrison made his debut for Durham in a List A match against Somerset in the 2012 Clydesdale Bank 40 at the Riverside Ground, Chester-le-Street. He ended Durham's innings of 222/9 on 7 not out, while with the ball he took the wickets of Craig Kieswetter and Peter Trego, finishing the match with figures of 2/51 from eight overs. Following the match, he made his first-class debut against the same opponents at the County Ground, Taunton, in the County Championship. Durham batted first and made 384 all out, with Harrison dismissed by Trego for 15 runs. Somerset responded in their first-innings with 400 all out, with Harrison taking figures of 4/112, returning the best figures of any Durham bowler in the innings. Durham were then dismissed for 167 in their second-innings, with Harrison dismissed by George Dockrell for 20. Requiring 152 for victory in their second-innings, Somerset reached 152/5 to win by 5 wickets, with Harrison taking a single wicket during the chase, that of Alex Barrow, to finish with innings figures of 1/19 from five overs, and match figures of 5/131.
