= Tom Shrewsbury =

English cricketer

Personal information
- Full name: Thomas Weldon Shrewsbury
- Born: 18 January 1995 (age 31); Southampton, Hampshire, England
- Batting: Right-handed
- Bowling: Right-arm off break

Domestic team information
- Years: Team
- 2013–2014: Gloucestershire (squad no. 50)
- Only FC: 2 August 2013 Gloucestershire v Northamptonshire
- Only T20: 30 July 2013 Gloucestershire v Glamorgan

Career statistics
Competition	FC	T20
Matches	1	1
Runs scored	2	–
Batting average	–	–
100s/50s	0/0	–/–
Top score	2*	–
Balls bowled	138	6
Wickets	1	0
Bowling average	94.00	–
5 wickets in innings	0	–
10 wickets in match	0	n/a
Best bowling	1/94	–
Catches/stumpings	0/–	0/–
- Source: CricketArchive, 21 June 2014

Thomas Weldon Shrewsbury (born 18 January 1995 in Southampton, Hampshire) is an English cricket player. Shrewsbury is a right-arm off spin bowler who bats right-handed. Shrewsbury made his first-class debut for Gloucestershire on 2 August 2013 against Northamptonshire.
