= Ryan Buckley =

English cricketer

Personal information
- Full name: Ryan Sean Buckley
- Born: 2 April 1994 (age 32); Darlington, County Durham, England
- Height: 6 ft 0 in (1.83 m)
- Batting: Right-handed
- Bowling: Right-arm off break
- Role: Bowler

Domestic team information
- Years: Team
- 2013–2015: Durham (squad no. 4)
- FC debut: 10 May 2013 Durham v Surrey
- Last FC: 15 August 2014 Durham v Lancashire

Career statistics
Competition	First-class
Matches	4
Runs scored	25
Batting average	5.00
100s/50s	0/0
Top score	9
Balls bowled	746
Wickets	10
Bowling average	38.40
5 wickets in innings	1
10 wickets in match	0
Best bowling	5/86
Catches/stumpings	4/–
- Source: CricketArchive, 19 August 2014

Ryan Sean Buckley (born 2 April 1994 in Darlington, County Durham) is an English cricketer who most recently played for Durham County Cricket Club. He is a right-arm off break bowler who also bats right handed. He made his first-class debut for the county in May 2013 against Surrey, taking 5/86. He is currently Director of Cricket Coaching at Sherborne School.
