= Richard Johnson (cricketer, born 1988) =

English cricketer

Personal information
- Full name: Richard Matthew Johnson
- Born: 1 September 1988 (age 38); Solihull, West Midlands, England
- Batting: Right-handed
- Role: Wicket-keeper

Domestic team information
- Years: Team
- 2008–2012: Warwickshire
- 2012: → Derbyshire (on loan)
- 2013–2014: Derbyshire
- FC debut: 12 May 2008 Warwickshire v Cambridge UCCE
- Last FC: 20 April 2014 Derbyshire v Hampshire
- LA debut: 11 May 2008 Warwickshire v Northants
- Last LA: 26 August 2013 Derbyshire v Hampshire

Career statistics
Competition	FC	LA	T20
Matches	29	26	22
Runs scored	911	215	46
Batting average	20.70	21.50	9.20
100s/50s	0/5	0/2	0/0
Top score	72	79	14
Catches/stumpings	56/2	19/4	6/3
- Source: CricInfo, 25 August 2015

Richard Matthew Johnson (born 1 September 1988) is an English former professional cricketer who played for Warwickshire and Derbyshire County Cricket Clubs. He played as a right-handed batsman and wicket-keeper.

Johnson was born in Solihull and educated at Solihull School. He played for ECB Schools against an India Under-19 team, before making his Minor Counties Championship debut for Herefordshire in the same year. In 2007 he began playing for Warwickshire Second XI and in May 2008 made his debut in List A cricket for the county before making first-class cricket debut for Warwickshire against Cambridge UCCE later the same month.

After two seasons with Derbyshire, Johnson retired from professional cricket in 2014. In December 2014 he returned to Warwickshire in the role of Assistant Strength and Conditioning Coach.
