= 2011 County Championship =

English cricket tournament

- Tournament logo
- Dates: 8 April – 15 September 2011
- Administrator: England and Wales Cricket Board
- Cricket format: First-class cricket (4 days)
- Tournament format: League system
- Champions: Lancashire (8th title)
- Participants: 18
- Matches: 144

The 2011 County Championship season, known as the LV County Championship for sponsorship reasons, was the 112th cricket County Championship season. It was contested through two divisions: Division One and Division Two. Each team played all the others in their division both home and away. Lancashire won Division One. The top two teams from Division Two were promoted to the first division for the 2012 season, while the bottom two sides from Division One were relegated. Aggregate attendances rose 9% to 531,000.

== Teams ==
Home grounds of each County

Division One	Division Two
Durham	Derbyshire
Hampshire	Essex
Lancashire	Glamorgan
Nottinghamshire	Gloucestershire
Somerset	Kent
Sussex	Leicestershire
Warwickshire	Middlesex
Worcestershire	Northamptonshire
Yorkshire	Surrey

Team promoted from Division Two
Team relegated from Division One

== Standings ==
Division One
	Team	P	W	L	D	Bat	Bowl	Ded	Pts
1	Lancashire (C)	16	10	4	2	37	44	1.0	246
2	Warwickshire	16	9	4	3	46	45	9.0	235
3	Durham	16	8	4	4	47	45	0.0	232
4	Somerset	16	6	7	3	45	39	0.0	189
5	Sussex	16	6	6	4	34	40	0.0	182
6	Nottinghamshire	16	5	6	5	35	43	0.0	173
7	Worcestershire	16	4	11	1	31	44	0.0	142
8	Yorkshire (R)	16	3	6	7	34	37	2.0	138
9	Hampshire (R)	16	3	6	7	30	36	8.0	127

Division Two
	Team	P	W	L	D	Bat	Bowl	Ded	Pts
1	Middlesex (C, P)	16	8	2	6	50	44	0.0	240
2	Surrey (P)	16	8	4	4	43	44	0.0	227
3	Northamptonshire	16	7	2	7	48	45	0.0	226
4	Gloucestershire	16	6	5	5	41	47	1.0	198
5	Derbyshire	16	5	6	5	42	44	0.0	181
6	Glamorgan	16	5	6	4	44	40	1.0	178
7	Essex	16	4	4	8	29	44	2.0	159
8	Kent	16	5	9	2	30	42	9.0	149
9	Leicestershire	16	1	11	4	24	36	0.0	88

== Results summary ==
=== Division One ===
Home \ Away	Durham	Hampshire	Lancashire	Nottinghamshire	Somerset	Sussex	Warwickshire	Worcestershire	Yorkshire
Durham		Durham; 50 runs	Durham; 5 wickets	Match drawn	Match drawn	Sussex; 2 wickets	Durham; 8 wickets	Durham; 151 runs	Match drawn
Hampshire	Match drawn		Lancashire; 10 wickets	Match drawn	Somerset; 9 wickets	Match drawn	Match drawn	Match drawn	Match drawn
Lancashire	Durham; 5 wickets	Lancashire; 8 wickets		Nottinghamshire; 129 runs	Lancashire; Inns & 20 runs	Lancashire; Inns & 55 runs	Match drawn	Lancashire; 98 runs	Lancashire; 6 wickets
Nottinghamshire	Nottinghamshire; 67 runs	Nottinghamshire; 9 wickets	Lancashire; 6 wickets		Match drawn	Sussex; Inns & 5 runs	Warwickshire; 9 wickets	Nottinghamshire; 3 wickets	Match drawn
Somerset	Somerset; 9 wickets	Hampshire; Inns & 61 runs	Lancashire; 8 wickets	Match drawn		Somerset; 9 wickets	Warwickshire; Inns & 382 runs	Somerset; 91 runs	Somerset; 10 wickets
Sussex	Durham; 208 runs	Sussex; 5 wickets	Match drawn	Sussex; 9 wickets	Sussex; 8 wickets		Warwickshire; 8 wickets	Worcestershire; 34 runs	Match drawn
Warwickshire	Durham; Inns & 103 runs	Hampshire; 209 runs	Lancashire; 147 runs	Warwickshire; Inns & 114 runs	Warwickshire; 10 wickets	Warwickshire; Inns & 43 runs		Warwickshire; 218 runs	Match drawn
Worcestershire	Durham; Inns & 25 runs	Worcestershire; 9 wickets	Worcestershire; 10 wickets	Worcestershire; 6 wickets	Somerset; Inns & 8 runs	Sussex; 251 runs	Warwickshire; 88 runs		Yorkshire; 9 wickets
Yorkshire	Durham; 146 runs	Match drawn	Lancashire; 23 runs	Nottinghamshire; 58 runs	Yorkshire; 6 wickets	Match drawn	Warwickshire; Inns & 58 runs	Yorkshire; 6 wickets	

Home team won	Visiting team won	Match drawn

=== Division Two ===
Home \ Away	Derbyshire	Essex	Glamorgan	Gloucestershire	Kent	Leicestershire	Middlesex	Northamptonshire	Surrey
Derbyshire		Match drawn	Derbyshire; 186 runs	Derbyshire; 7 wickets	Derbyshire; 101 runs	Derbyshire; Inns & 32 runs	Middlesex; 3 wickets	Northamptonshire; 165 runs	Surrey; 7 wickets
Essex	Match drawn		Essex; 6 wickets	Match drawn	Kent; 57 runs	Essex; 280 runs	Match drawn	Essex; 171 runs	Surrey; 109 runs
Glamorgan	Derbyshire; 6 wickets	Match drawn		Glamorgan; 89 runs	Glamorgan; Inns & 8 runs	Glamorgan; 108 runs	Match drawn	Match drawn	Match drawn
Gloucestershire	Gloucestershire; 7 wickets	Match drawn	Gloucestershire; 5 wickets		Gloucestershire; Inns & 142 runs	Gloucestershire; 10 wickets	Match drawn	Northamptonshire; Inns & 6 runs	Surrey; 2 wickets
Kent	Match drawn	Kent; 6 wickets	Kent; 8 wickets	Gloucestershire; 45 runs		Kent; 5 wickets	Kent; 69 runs	Northamptonshire; 5 wickets	Kent; 265 runs
Leicestershire	Match drawn	Essex; 254 runs	Leicestershire; 89 runs	Match drawn	Match drawn		Middlesex; 5 wickets	Northamptonshire; Inns & 155 runs	Surrey; 10 wickets
Middlesex	Middlesex; 7 wickets	Middlesex; 8 wickets	Glamorgan; 9 wickets	Match drawn	Middlesex; 9 wickets	Middlesex; 10 wickets		Match drawn	Middlesex; Inns & 42 runs
Northamptonshire	Match drawn	Match drawn	Northamptonshire; Inns & 177 runs	Northamptonshire; 9 wickets	Northamptonshire; Inns & 159 runs	Match drawn	Match drawn		Surrey; 333 runs
Surrey	Surrey; Inns & 126 runs	Match drawn	Match drawn	Gloucestershire; 4 wickets	Surrey; 21 runs	Surrey; 205 runs	Middlesex; 6 wickets	Match drawn	

Home team won	Visiting team won	Match drawn

== Results ==
=== Division One ===
==== April ====
8–11 April
Scorecard

Durham	v	Hampshire (H)
473 (110.5 overs); Dale Benkenstein 118 (154); Danny Briggs 5/129 (29.5 overs)		294 (83 overs); Neil McKenzie 75 (148); Ben Stokes 6/68 (13 overs)
310/3d (68 overs); Ben Stokes 135* (145); Johann Myburgh 1/30 (6 overs)		345/5 (113 overs); James Adams 105 (248); Ian Blackwell 2/50 (13 overs)

Match drawn
The Rose Bowl, Southampton
Umpires: David Millns and Tim Robinson

- Durham won the toss and elected to bat
- Points: Durham 11, Hampshire 8

8–11 April
Scorecard

Sussex	v	Lancashire (H)
243 (79.3 overs); Joe Gatting 90 (122); Glen Chapple 5/68 (23 overs)		472 (157.5 overs); Karl Brown 114 (236); Monty Panesar 4/105 (47 overs)
174 (62.5 overs); Chris Nash 43 (44); Gary Keedy 5/41 (26 overs)

Lancashire won by an innings and 55 runs
Aigburth, Liverpool
Umpires: Rob Bailey and Stephen Gale

- Sussex won the toss and elected to bat
- Points: Lancashire 22, Sussex 2

8–11 April
Scorecard

(H) Worcestershire	v	Yorkshire
286 (93.1 overs); Matt Mason 63 (54); Adil Rashid 6/77 (29 overs)		368 (121 overs); Gerard Brophy 177* (273); Matt Mason 3/72 (22 overs)
137 (38.5 overs); Alexei Kervezee 52 (53); Adil Rashid 5/37 (9.5 overs)		56/1 (12.3 overs); Adam Lyth 29* (36); Alan Richardson 1/15 (4 overs)

Yorkshire won by 9 wickets
New Road, Worcester
Umpires: Mark Benson and Nigel Llong

- Worcestershire won the toss and elected to bat
- Points: Yorkshire 22, Worcestershire 4

14–17 April
Scorecard

Durham	v	Yorkshire (H)
327 (97.2 overs); Michael Di Venuto 74 (84); Ryan Sidebottom 4/72 (24.2 overs)		149 (60.1 overs); Joe Root 45 (103); Graham Onions 5/53 (15 overs)
311/6d (86.5 overs); Dale Benkenstein 150 (213); Moin Ashraf 2/44 (15 overs)		343 (118.4 overs); Rich Pyrah 87 (184); Scott Borthwick 3/49 (25.4 overs)

Durham won by 146 runs
Headingley, Leeds
Umpires: Richard Illingworth and Steve O'Shaughnessy

- Durham won the toss and elected to bat
- Points: Durham 22, Yorkshire 3

14–17 April
Scorecard

Hampshire	v	Nottinghamshire (H)
218 (67.3 overs); Dominic Cork 48 (63); Andre Adams 5/54 (18 overs)		327 (84.4 overs); Samit Patel 116 (199); David Griffiths 6/85 (28.4 overs)
131 (46.2 overs); James Vince 59* (107); Andre Adams 6/31 (12 overs)		26/1 (4.1 overs); Mark Wagh 11* (8); David Griffiths 1/17 (2.1 overs)

Nottinghamshire won by 9 wickets
Trent Bridge, Nottingham
Umpires: Mark Benson and Richard Kettleborough

- Nottinghamshire won the toss and elected to field
- Points: Nottinghamshire 22, Hampshire 4

14–17 April
Scorecard

Warwickshire	v	Somerset (H)
642 (144.1 overs); Varun Chopra 210 (348); Charl Willoughby 4/139 (34 overs)		210 (49 overs); Arul Suppiah 62 (83); Chris Woakes 6/85 (19 overs)
		50 (14.4 overs) (f/o); Craig Kieswetter 13 (17); Rikki Clarke 5/10 (3.4 overs)

Warwickshire won by an innings and 382 runs
County Ground, Taunton
Umpires: Neil Mallender and David Millns

- Somerset won the toss and elected to field
- Points: Warwickshire 24, Somerset 3

20–23 April
Scorecard

(H) Durham	v	Sussex
292 (80.4 overs); Gordon Muchall 74 (119); Monty Panesar 4/88 (28.4 overs)		194 (66.3 overs); Andy Hodd 67 (117); Callum Thorp 3/52 (20 overs)
210 (57.1 overs); Ian Blackwell 51 (46); Naved-ul-Hasan 4/43 (19 overs)		309/8 (104.5 overs); Luke Wells 103 (247); Ruel Brathwaite 5/56 (23 overs)

Sussex won by 2 wickets
Riverside Ground, Chester-le-Street
Umpires: Neil Bainton and Neil Mallender

- Durham won the toss and elected to bat
- Points: Sussex 19, Durham 5

20–23 April
Scorecard

Warwickshire	v	Worcestershire (H)
201 (59 overs); Chris Woakes 47* (52); Damien Wright 5/62 (17 overs)		375 (106.2 overs); Moeen Ali 92 (162); Boyd Rankin 5/57 (23.2 overs)
461/8d (139 overs); Varun Chopra 228 (368); Alan Richardson 4/97 (40 overs)		199 (58.2 overs); Alexei Kervezee 65 (91); Chris Woakes 6/49 (20 overs)

Warwickshire won by 88 runs
New Road, Worcester
Umpires: Peter Hartley and Richard Kettleborough

- Worcestershire won the toss and elected to field
- Points: Warwickshire 20, Worcestershire 7

20–23 April
Scorecard

Somerset	v	Lancashire (H)
268 (73.1 overs); Nick Compton 61 (124); Gary Keedy 3/26 (12 overs)		451 (137.1 overs); Farveez Maharoof 102 (134); Steve Kirby 6/115 (30 overs)
163 (53.3 overs); Gemaal Hussain 42 (80); Tom Smith 2/25 (8.1 overs)

Lancashire won by an innings and 20 runs
Aigburth, Liverpool
Umpires: Nigel Cowley and Jeff Evans

- Somerset won the toss and elected to bat
- Points: Lancashire 22, Somerset 4

20–23 April
Scorecard

Nottinghamshire	v	Yorkshire (H)
143 (35.4 overs); Alex Hales 85 (89); Rich Pyrah 5/58 (10.4 overs)		336 (91.2 overs); Andrew Gale 145* (205); Luke Fletcher 4/97 (23 overs)
337 (114.1 overs); Chris Read 86 (168); Ryan Sidebottom 4/67 (23.1 overs)		86 (30.2 overs); Jonny Bairstow 50* (77); Paul Franks 3/24 (7 overs)

Nottinghamshire won by 58 runs
Headingley, Leeds
Umpires: Steve Garratt and Peter Willey

- Nottinghamshire won the toss and elected to bat
- Points: Nottinghamshire 19, Yorkshire 6

26–29 April
Scorecard

Warwickshire	v	Durham (H)
429 (127 overs); William Porterfield 87 (153); Ruel Brathwaite 5/75 (24 overs)		465 (128 overs); Ian Blackwell 125 (172); Boyd Rankin 3/98 (26 overs)
137 (63 overs); Tim Ambrose 51 (82); Scott Borthwick 4/25 (13 overs)		102/2 (25.4 overs); Scott Borthwick 48* (79); Paul Best 1/13 (2 overs)

Durham won by 8 wickets
Riverside Ground, Chester-le-Street
Umpires: Rob Bailey and John Steele

- Warwickshire won the toss and elected to bat
- Points: Durham 24, Warwickshire 6

26–29 April
Scorecard

Worcestershire	v	Nottinghamshire (H)
315 (114 overs); Matthew Pardoe 74 (239); Andre Adams 5/73 (27 overs)		382 (103.2 overs); Paul Franks 82 (125); Alan Richardson 5/98 (30.2 overs)
328 (94.2 overs); Alexei Kervezee 128 (194); Paul Franks 3/28 (49 overs)		266/7 (59.3 overs); Alex Hales 84 (112); Alan Richardson 4/88 (20 overs)

Nottinghamshire won by 3 wickets
Trent Bridge, Nottingham
Umpires: Jeremy Lloyds and David Millns

- Nottinghamshire won the toss and elected to field
- Points: Nottinghamshire 22, Worcestershire 6

26–29 April
Scorecard

Lancashire	v	Sussex (H)
590 (158.4 overs); Gareth Cross 125 (195); Naved-ul-Hasan 3/95 (25 overs)		290 (91 overs); Murray Goodwin 113 (211); Glen Chapple 4/63 (24 overs)
		459/9d (124.2 overs) (f/o); Ed Joyce 140 (256); Gary Keedy 4/200 (55 overs)

Match drawn
County Ground, Hove
Umpires: Michael Gough and Steve O'Shaughnessy

- Lancashire won the toss and elected to bat
- Points: Lancashire 10, Sussex 7

27–30 April
Scorecard

(H) Hampshire	v	Somerset
285 (84.4 overs); Liam Dawson 91 (207); Charl Willoughby 4/40 (19 overs)		513 (134 overs); Marcus Trescothick 227 (376); Danny Briggs 5/79 (38 overs)
341 (106 overs); Liam Dawson 169 (308); Peter Trego 4/74 (21 overs)		114/1 (24.3 overs); Nick Compton 47* (58); Friedel de Wet 1/18 (6 overs)

Somerset won by 9 wickets
The Rose Bowl, Southampton
Umpires: Steve Garratt and Ian Gould

- Hampshire won the toss and elected to bat
- Points: Somerset 24, Hampshire 3

==== May ====
4–7 May
Scorecard

Sussex	v	Hampshire (H)
438 (140.1 overs); Ed Joyce 103 (221); David Griffiths 3/73 (26 overs)		480 (143.4 overs); James Vince 157 (283); Naved Arif 4/70 (21 overs)
254/6d (74 overs); Luke Wells 100 (176); Danny Briggs 4/99 (30 overs)

Match drawn
The Rose Bowl, Southampton
Umpires: Richard Illingworth and George Sharp

- Sussex won the toss and elected to bat
- Points: Hampshire 9, Sussex 7

4–7 May
Scorecard

Yorkshire	v	Nottinghamshire (H)
534/9d (162.5 overs); Jonny Bairstow 205 (292); Paul Franks 4/135 (30 overs)		428 (95.5 overs); Ben Phillips 71* (104); Adil Rashid 3/44 (16 overs)
113/2d (51 overs); Adam Lyth 52 (114); Steven Mullaney 1/13 (12 overs)		31/0 (13 overs); Mark Wagh 25* (34)

Match drawn
Trent Bridge, Nottingham
Umpires: Ian Gould and Steve O'Shaughnessy

- Yorkshire won the toss and elected to bat
- Points: Nottinghamshire 10, Yorkshire 9

4–7 May
Scorecard

(H) Somerset	v	Worcestershire
309 (95.4 overs); Craig Kieswetter 117 (175); Gareth Andrew 4/93 (14.4 overs)		238 (58.2 overs); Vikram Solanki 69 (81); Steve Kirby 4/64 (14.2 overs)
185 (63.2 overs); Jos Buttler 46* (59); Damien Wright 6/56 (23.2 overs)		165 (43.3 overs); Vikram Solanki 39 (47); Gemaal Hussain 6/33 (11.3 overs)

Somerset won by 91 runs
County Ground, Taunton
Umpires: Neil Mallender and John Steele

- Somerset won the toss and elected to bat
- Points: Somerset 22, Worcestershire 4

4–7 May
Scorecard

Lancashire	v	Warwickshire (H)
227 (78 overs); Stephen Moore 67 (138); Boyd Rankin 5/57 (17 overs)		172 (63.2 overs); Tim Ambrose 43 (79); Luke Procter 3/33 (9 overs)
189 (68.3 overs); Steven Croft 67 (149); Chris Woakes 4/40 (23 overs)		97 (30.2 overs); Jonathan Trott 39 (54); Simon Kerrigan 5/7 (7 overs)

Lancashire won by 147 runs
Edgbaston, Birmingham
Umpires: Nigel Llong and Tim Robinson

- Lancashire won the toss and elected to bat
- Points: Lancashire 20, Warwickshire 3

10–13 May
Scorecard

Somerset	v	Durham (H)
610/6d (96 overs); Nick Compton 254* (434); Callum Thorp 2/76 (25 overs)		237 (64.4 overs); Michael Di Venuto 86 (124); Gemaal Hussain 4/49 (17 overs)
		489/6 (151 overs) (f/o); Ben Stokes 120 (136); Steve Kirby 3/84 (33 overs)

Match drawn
Riverside Ground, Chester-le-Street
Umpires: Neil Bainton and Peter Willey

- Durham won the toss and elected to field
- Points: Somerset 11, Durham 5

10–13 May
Scorecard

(H) Sussex	v	Nottinghamshire
304 (93.4 overs); Chris Nash 93 (165); Samit Patel 3/37 (20 overs)		145 (52.3 overs); Samit Patel 63 (98); James Anyon 4/52 (14.3 overs)
187/1 (39.5 overs); Ed Joyce 88* (114); Samit Patel 1/53 (12 overs)		342 (92.3 overs) (f/o); Andre Adams 64 (44); James Anyon 4/104 (20.3 overs)

Sussex won by 9 wickets
County Ground, Hove
Umpires: Richard Kettleborough and Nigel Llong
Player of the match: James Anyon (Sussex)

- Sussex won the toss and elected to bat
- Points: Sussex 22, Nottinghamshire 3

11–14 May
Scorecard

(H) Warwickshire	v	Worcestershire
382 (109.4 overs); Mohammad Yousuf 109 (181); Damien Wright 5/83 (30 overs)		228 (70.4 overs); Matthew Pardoe 58 (134); Chris Metters 6/65 (23.4 overs)
173/8d (47 overs); Mohammad Yousuf 68 (73); Gareth Andrew 3/41 (10 overs)		109 (36.1 overs); Ben Scott 31 (29); Naqaash Tahir 4/36 (17 overs)

Warwickshire won by 218 runs
Edgbaston, Birmingham
Umpires: Martin Bodenham and Ian Gould

- Warwickshire won the toss and elected to bat
- Points: Warwickshire 15, Worcestershire 4

11–14 May
Scorecard

(H) Yorkshire	v	Hampshire
355 (124.4 overs); Tim Bresnan 87 (179); Dominic Cork 5/75 (37.4 overs)		232 (82.3 overs); Johann Myburgh 64 (125); Ajmal Shahzad 5/65 (21.3 overs)
165/8d (56 overs); Gerard Brophy 37* (98); Kabir Ali 4/43 (16 overs)		153/8 (59 overs); Sean Ervine 55 (79); Tim Bresnan 3/18 (10 overs)

Match drawn
Headingley, Leeds
Umpires: Jeremy Lloyds and Neil Mallender

- Yorkshire won the toss and elected to bat
- Points: Yorkshire 9, Hampshire 6

18–21 May
Scorecard

Yorkshire	v	Lancashire (H)
141 (73.3 overs); Joe Sayers 53 (148); Farveez Maharoof 4/35 (16 overs)		329 (114.5 overs); Paul Horton 93 (119); Steven Patterson 4/51 (24.5 overs)
308 (130.3 overs); Joe Sayers 75 (232); Gary Keedy 6/133 (54 overs)		121/4 (14.2 overs); Farveez Maharoof 31* (19); Adil Rashid 3/34 (3.2 overs)

Lancashire won by 6 wickets
Aigburth, Liverpool
Umpires: Neil Bainton and Richard Illingworth

- Lancashire won the toss and elected to field
- Points: Lancashire 22, Yorkshire 2

18–21 May
Scorecard

Warwickshire	v	Nottinghamshire (H)
376 (94.5 overs); Ian Bell 139 (224); Stuart Broad 3/92 (26.5 overs)		117 (37.3 overs); Stuart Broad 24 (31); Darren Maddy 3/29 (10 overs)
60/1 (8 overs); Ian Bell 33* (16); Charlie Shreck 1/27 (3 overs)		318 (81.4 overs) f/o Paul Franks 96 (187); Darren Maddy 3/74 (27 overs)

Warwickshire won by 9 wickets
Trent Bridge, Nottingham
Umpires: Nigel Cowley and David Millns

- Nottinghamshire won the toss and elected to field
- Points: Warwickshire 23, Nottinghamshire 3

18–21 May
Scorecard

Somerset	v	Sussex (H)
213 (56.2 overs); Marcus Trescothick 63 (84); Naved-ul-Hasan 5/79 (23.2 overs)		177 (52.4 overs); James Anyon 51 (82); Peter Trego 4/24 (11.4 overs)
235 (74.2 overs); Marcus Trescothick 79 (120); Naved-ul-Hasan 5/82 (23.2 overs)		275/2 (68.4 overs); Chris Nash 120 (175); Lewis Gregory 1/15 (5 overs)

Sussex won by 8 wickets
County Ground, Hove
Umpires: Steve Garratt and Nigel Llong

- Sussex won the toss and elected to field
- Points: Sussex 19, Somerset 4

18–21 May
Scorecard

Durham	v	Worcestershire (H)
587/7d (136 overs); Gordon Muchall 175 (286); Damien Wright 2/118 (35 overs)		217 (63.3 overs); Moeen Ali 46 (93); Steve Harmison 4/67 (18 overs)
		345 (87.3 overs) (f/o); Ben Scott 73 (101); Steve Harmison 3/84 (18.3 overs)

Durham won by an innings and 25 runs
New Road, Worcester
Umpires: Rob Bailey and Michael Gough

- Durham won the toss and elected to bat
- Points: Durham 24, Worcestershire 3

24–27 May
Scorecard

Lancashire	v	Hampshire (H)
328 (95.5 overs); Karl Brown 96 (174); Dominic Cork 4/78 (24.5 overs)		133 (41.4 overs); Jimmy Adams 35 (66); Kyle Hogg 7/28 (14 overs)
8/0 (0.3 overs); Paul Horton 8* (3)		201 (66.5 overs) (f/o); Benny Howell 71 (177); Kyle Hogg 4/31 (17 overs)

Lancashire won by 10 wickets
The Rose Bowl, Hampshire
Umpires: Paul Baldwin and Richard Kettleborough

- Hampshire won the toss and elected to field
- Points: Lancashire 22, Hampshire 3

24–27 May
Scorecard

Yorkshire	v	Somerset (H)
358 (90 overs); Jonny Bairstow 136 (169); Steve Kirby 3/54 (23 overs)		452 (119.2 overs); Marcus Trescothick 189 (257); Adil Rashid 4/100 (19.2 overs)
321 (107 overs); Jonny Bairstow 80 (111); Arul Suppiah 2/26 (14 overs)		228/0 (40.1 overs); Marcus Trescothick 151 (131)

Somerset won by 10 wickets
County Ground, Taunton
Umpires: Michael Gough and Nigel Llong

- Yorkshire won the toss and elected to bat
- Points: Somerset 24, Yorkshire 6

24–27 May
Scorecard

Durham	v	Warwickshire (H)
602/6d (143.1 overs); Will Smith 179 (363); Chris Metters 2/128 (28 overs)		186 (47.2 overs); Varun Chopra 79 (98); Ben Stokes 4/48 (11.2 overs)
		313 (108 overs) (f/o); Keith Barker 101 (156); Ruel Brathwaite 3/62 (16 overs)

Durham won by an innings and 103 runs
Edgbaston, Birmingham
Umpires: Trevor Jesty and Neil Mallender

- Durham won the toss and elected to bat
- Points: Durham 24, Warwickshire 1

29 May–1 June
Scorecard

Lancashire	v	Durham (H)
313 (93.3 overs); Paul Horton 94 (176); Ian Blackwell 3/57 (22.3 overs)		586 (140 overs); Ben Stokes 185 (272); Glen Chapple 2/97 (28 overs)
148 (59.4 overs); Paul Horton 34 (78); Ian Blackwell 4/34 (16.4 overs)

Durham won by an innings and 125 runs
Riverside Ground, Chester-le-Street
Umpires: Martin Bodenham and Jeremy Lloyds

- Durham won the toss and elected to field
- Points: Durham 24, Lancashire 4

29 May–1 June
Scorecard

(H) Sussex	v	Yorkshire
548/4d (150.4 overs); Murray Goodwin 274* (397); Steven Patterson 1/76 (32 overs)		273 (93.5 overs); Joe Root 70 (195); Wayne Parnell 3/60 (72 overs)
		314/8 (106.3 overs); Jonny Bairstow 76 (93); Monty Panesar 5/89 (36.3 overs)

Match drawn
County Ground, Hove
Umpires: Richard Kettleborough and Neil Mallender

- Yorkshire won the toss and elected to field
- Points: Sussex 10, Yorkshire 10

29 May–1 June
Scorecard

Nottinghamshire	v	Worcestershire (H)
223 (67.3 overs); Riki Wessels 67 (83); Damien Wright 3/40 (18 overs)		243 (85.4 overs); Moeen Ali 84 (192); Charlie Shreck 5/52 (18.4 overs)
273/8d (84 overs); Chris Read 120* (169); Jack Shantry 3/65 (24 overs)		255/4 (45.5 overs); Vikram Solanki 85 (104); Samit Patel 2/92 (14.5 overs)

Worcestershire won by 6 wickets
New Road, Worcester
Umpires: Stephen Gale and John Steele

- Nottinghamshire won the toss and elected to bat
- Points: Worcestershire 20, Nottinghamshire 4

==== June ====
18–21 June
Scorecard

Yorkshire	v	Durham (H)
185 (59.1 overs); Adil Rashid 47 (71); Steve Harmison 3/27 (12.1 overs)		408/8d (77.5 overs); Paul Collingwood 108 (157); Steven Patterson 3/82 (18 overs)
280/4d (82 overs); Andrew Gale 101* (200); Ian Blackwell 1/50 (17 overs)

Match drawn
Riverside Ground, Chester-le-Street
Umpires: Martin Bodenham and Tim Robinson

- Durham won the toss and elected to field
- Points: Durham 11, Yorkshire 8

18–21 June
Scorecard

(H) Worcestershire	v	Hampshire
403/8d (106 overs); Vikram Solanki 173 (272); Dimitri Mascarenhas 3/76 (28 overs)		239 (65 overs); Nic Pothas 60 (74); Alan Richardson 4/56 (18 overs)
108/1 (24.5 overs); Daryl Mitchell 57* (84); Imran Tahir 1/43 (8 overs)		269 (87.2 overs) (f/o); Neil McKenzie 106 (221); Alan Richardson 5/58 (22 overs)

Worcestershire won by 9 wickets
New Road, Worcester
Umpires: Michael Gough and Trevor Jesty

- Worcestershire won the toss and elected to bat
- Points: Worcestershire 24, Hampshire 3

20–23 June
Scorecard

(H) Nottinghamshire	v	Lancashire
326 (91.5 overs); Paul Franks 69 (155); Sajid Mahmood 5/112 (22 overs)		306 (102.4 overs); Paul Horton 99 (200); Luke Fletcher 5/82 (25.4 overs)
216 (47.1 overs); Paul Franks 57 (88); Sajid Mahmood 5/74 (14.1 overs)		240/4 (70 overs); Stephen Moore 124* (208); Charlie Shreck 3/54 (70 overs)

Lancashire won by 6 wickets
Trent Bridge, Nottingham
Umpires: Jeremy Lloyds and Peter Willey

- Nottinghamshire won the toss and elected to bat
- Points: Lancashire 21, Nottinghamshire 6

20–23 June
Scorecard

Somerset	v	Warwickshire (H)
262 (68.3 overs); Marcus Trescothick 69 (111); Boyd Rankin 4/41 (14 overs)		448 (138.1 overs); Ian Westwood 129 (220); Charl Willoughby 3/109 (29.1 overs)
208 (87.2 overs); Nick Compton 95 (276); Rikki Clarke 4/34 (17.2 overs)		23/0 (3.2 overs); Varun Chopra 13* (11)

Warwickshire won by 10 wickets
Edgbaston, Birmingham
Umpires: Richard Illingworth and George Sharp

- Somerset won the toss and elected to bat
- Points: Warwickshire 23, Somerset 3

27–30 June
Scorecard

(H) Lancashire	v	Durham
84 (33.2 overs); Stephen Moore 27 (60); Callum Thorp 6/20 (12.2 overs)		186 (49.5 overs); Dale Benkenstein 83* (133); Luke Procter 3/39 (9 overs)
282 (84.2 overs); Paul Horton 64 (100); Graham Onions 4/74 (15.2 overs)		182/5 (53.4 overs); Dale Benkenstein 60 (89); Kyle Hogg 2/51 (15 overs)

Durham won by 5 wickets
Aigburth, Liverpool
Umpires: Mark Benson and Steve Garratt

- Durham won the toss and elected to field
- Points: Durham 19, Lancashire 3

29 June–2 July
Scorecard

(H) Sussex	v	Warwickshire
251 (77.4 overs); Ed Joyce 73 (129); Rikki Clarke 3/52 (18.4 overs)		481 (146.3 overs); Rikki Clarke 81* (150); Luke Wright 3/54 (17 overs)
301 (88.3 overs); Luke Wright 116 (124); Jeetan Patel 5/96 (34 overs)		72/2 (15.4 overs); Varun Chopra 24 (39); Monty Panesar 1/16 (7.4 overs)

Warwickshire won by 8 wickets
Arundel Castle Cricket Club Ground
Umpires: Peter Hartley and Steve O'Shaughnessy

- Sussex won the toss and elected to bat
- Points: Warwickshire 23, Sussex 4

==== July ====
11–14 July
Scorecard

Somerset	v	Nottinghamshire (H)
386 (110.4 overs); Craig Kieswetter 164 (235); Stuart Broad 5/95 (30.4 overs)		492 (116.4 overs); Alex Hales 184 (290); Charl Willoughby 3/115 (31.4 overs)
426 (117.1 overs); Nick Compton 115 (268); Samit Patel 4/70 (20.1 overs)		41/2 (15 overs); Alex Hales 18 (31); Arul Suppiah 1/5 (3 overs)

Match drawn
Trent Bridge, Nottingham
Umpires: Neil Mallender and Tim Robinson

- Nottinghamshire won the toss and elected to field
- Points: Nottinghamshire 11, Somerset 9

11–14 July
Scorecard

Hampshire	v	Sussex (H)
206 (80 overs); Liam Dawson 38 (57); Monty Panesar 4/71 (33 overs)		240 (90.4 overs); Ollie Rayner 62* (118); Danny Briggs 4/85 (36 overs)
266 (87.2 overs); Michael Carberry 59 (136); Amjad Khan 3/35 (13.2 overs)		235/5 (77.1 overs); Matt Prior 97* (167); Danny Briggs 3/71 (30 overs)

Sussex won by 5 wickets
County Ground, Hove
Umpires: Steve Garratt and David Millns

- Hampshire won the toss and elected to bat
- Points: Sussex 20, Hampshire 4

11–14 July
Scorecard

Worcestershire	v	Yorkshire (H)
168 (54 overs); Gareth Andrew 40 (44); Tim Bresnan 4/64 (14 overs)		367 (107.1 overs); Andrew Gale 72 (96); Alan Richardson 3/66 (28 overs)
332 (90.5 overs); Gareth Andrew 57 (72); Rich Pyrah 4/91 (21 overs)		135/4 (48.3 overs); Joe Root 52* (143); Saeed Ajmal 2/53 (19 overs)

Yorkshire won by 6 wickets
North Marine Road Ground, Scarborough
Umpires: Rob Bailey and Neil Bainton

- Yorkshire won the toss and elected to field
- Points: Yorkshire 21, Worcestershire 3

20–23 July
Scorecard

(H) Hampshire	v	Nottinghamshire
213 (85.5 overs); Neil McKenzie 97* (235); Samit Patel 4/43 (32 overs)		183 (81.2 overs); Steven Mullaney 36 (83); Danny Briggs 6/65 (29 overs)
171 (65 overs); Jimmy Adams 33 (109); Samit Patel 7/68 (28 overs)		198/6 (72 overs); Adam Voges 79 (177); Imran Tahir 3/66 (26 overs)

Match drawn
The Rose Bowl, Southampton
Umpires: Nigel Llong and John Steele

- Hampshire won the toss and elected to bat
- Points: Nottinghamshire 6, Hampshire ?1

20–23 July
Scorecard

(H) Warwickshire	v	Sussex
521 (152.1 overs); Keith Barker 118 (127); James Anyon 5/136 (34.1 overs)		259 (93.2 overs); Murray Goodwin 94 (222); Jeetan Patel 4/52 (22.2 overs)
		219 (76.5 overs) (f/o); Ed Joyce 74 (135); Jeetan Patel 6/111 (34.5 overs)

Warwickshire won by an innings and 43 runs
Edgbaston, Birmingham
Umpires: Neil Bainton and Nick Cook

- Sussex won the toss and elected to field
- Points: Warwickshire 2, Sussex 4

20–23 July
Scorecard

Lancashire	v	Yorkshire (H)
328 (92.2 overs); Steven Croft 54 (108); Ryan Sidebottom 4/68 (22.2 overs)		239 (68.4 overs); Rich Pyrah 117 (126); Kyle Hogg 5/62 (15 overs)
194 (65 overs); Kyle Hogg 52 (67); Tim Bresnan 4/50 (24 overs)		260 (76.5 overs); Adil Rashid 48* (87); Glen Chapple 5/71 (26 overs)

Lancashire won by 23 runs
Headingley, Leeds
Umpires: Neil Mallender and George Sharp

- Yorkshire won the toss and elected to field
- Points: Lancashire 22, Yorkshire 4

21–24 July
Scorecard

(H) Somerset	v	Durham
480 (109 overs); Marcus Trescothick 163 (226); Mitchell Claydon 6/104 (28 overs)		220 (74 overs); Will Smith 74 (194); Alfonso Thomas 4/62 (15 overs)
119/1 (21.5 overs); Arul Suppiah 66* (61); Graham Onions 1/37 (7 overs)		378 (114 overs) (f/o); Will Smith 114 (241); Charl Willoughby 4/18 (24 overs)

Somerset won by 9 wickets
County Ground, Taunton
Umpires: Jeremy Lloyds and Steve O'Shaughnessy

- Durham won the toss and elected to field
- Points: Somerset 24, Durham 4

26–29 July
Scorecard

Nottinghamshire	v	Lancashire (H)
203 (63.2 overs); Samit Patel 37 (35); Kyle Hogg 5/28 (13 overs)		179 (57.5 overs); Stephen Moore 37 (58); Andre Adams 6/71 (24 overs)
233 (64.3 overs); Graeme White 54* (75); Glen Chapple 6/70 (25.3 overs)		128 (50.1 overs); Karl Brown 23 (67); Darren Pattinson 5/44 (19 overs)

Nottinghamshire won by 129 runs
Trafalgar Road Ground, Southport
Umpires: Steve Garratt and Trevor Jesty

- Nottinghamshire won the toss and elected to bat
- Points: Nottinghamshire 20, Lancashire 3

26–29 July
Scorecard

(H) Worcestershire	v	Somerset
488 (129.4 overs); Moeen Ali 158 (244); Charl Willoughby 4/115 (33 overs)		591 (151.5 overs); Marcus Trescothick 203 (296); Saeed Ajmal 5/150 (51 overs)
95 (39 overs); Daryl Mitchell 26 (85); Peter Trego 4/22 (7 overs)

Somerset won by an innings and 8 runs
New Road, Worcester
Umpires: Jeremy Lloyds and Nick Cook

- Worcestershire won the toss and elected to bat
- Points: Somerset 22, Worcestershire 6

==== August ====
1–4 August
Scorecard

(H) Lancashire	v	Warwickshire
189 (46.5 overs); Stephen Moore 76 (94); Neil Carter 6/30 (8.5 overs)		280 (82.1 overs); Chris Woakes 60 (112); Gary Keedy 3/48 (17.1 overs)
380 (113.5 overs); Steven Croft 122 (182); Boyd Rankin 4/77 (20.5 overs)		217/8 (68 overs); Tim Ambrose 66* (137); Gary Keedy 3/53 (23 overs)

Match drawn
Aigburth, Liverpool
Umpires: Steve O'Shaughnessy and Martin Saggers

- Warwickshire won the toss and elected to field
- Points: Lancashire 6, Warwickshire 8

2–5 August
Scorecard

(H) Durham	v	Nottinghamshire
351 (89.2 overs); Michael Di Venuto 132 (196); Andre Adams 5/82 (27 overs)		261 (71.4 overs); Chris Read 133* (194); Graham Onions 6/95 (19.4 overs)
181/3d (50.5 overs); Dale Benkenstein 61* (100); Charlie Shreck 2/35 (17 overs)		172/5 (54 overs); Adam Voges 68* (131); Ian Blackwell 2/30 (19 overs)

Match drawn
Riverside Ground, Chester-le-Street
Umpires: Nigel Cowley and Stephen Gale

- Durham won the toss and elected to bat
- Points: Durham 10, Nottinghamshire 8

2–5 August
Scorecard

Yorkshire	v	Hampshire (H)
532 (171.2 overs); Anthony McGrath 115 (296); Imran Tahir 6/132 (49.2 overs)		599/3d (152.5 overs); Michael Carberry 300* (427); David Wainwright 2/150 (44.5 overs)
40/0 (11 overs); Jacques Rudolph 27* (43)

Match drawn
The Rose Bowl, Southampton
Umpires: Jeff Evans and Richard Kettleborough

- Yorkshire won the toss and elected to bat
- Points: Hampshire 9, Yorkshire 6

2–5 August
Scorecard

Sussex	v	Somerset (H)
245 (81.1 overs); Ed Joyce 59 (99); Alfonso Thomas 6/60 (22.1 overs)		286 (83.5 overs); Jos Buttler 100 (112); Monty Panesar 5/73 (28 overs)
134 (53 overs); Ed Joyce 34 (67); Alfonso Thomas 4/28 (15 overs)		94/1 (18.1 overs); Marcus Trescothick 54 (47); Ollie Rayner 1/35 (8.1 overs)

Somerset won by nine wickets
County Ground, Taunton
Umpires: Steve Garratt and Michael Gough

- Sussex won the toss and elected to bat
- Points: Somerset 21, Sussex 4

10–13 August
Scorecard

Hampshire	v	Durham (H)
275/7d (95 overs); Neil McKenzie 90 (150); Callum Thorp 3/52 (26 overs)		Innings forfeited
Innings forfeited		225 (63.2 overs); Phil Mustard 56 (105); Dimitri Mascarenhas 6/62 (23.2 overs)

Hampshire won by 50 runs
Riverside Ground, Chester-le-Street
Umpires: Nick Cook and Richard Illingworth

- Durham won the toss and elected to field
- Points: Hampshire 18, Durham 2

10–13 August
Scorecard

Worcestershire	v	Sussex (H)
290 (87.3 overs); Moeen Ali 71 (136); James Anyon 4/71 (17.3 overs)		265 (90 overs); Joe Gatting 61 (77); Moeen Ali 3/43 (17 overs)
311 (92.3 overs); Moeen Ali 68 (137); Monty Panesar 4/101 (38.3 overs)		302 (94.4 overs); Murray Goodwin 122 (193); Saeed Ajmal 6/124 (38 overs)

Worcestershire won by 34 runs
Cricketfield Road Ground, Horsham
Umpires: Nigel Cowley and George Sharp

- Sussex won the toss and elected to field
- Points: Worcestershire 21, Sussex 5

17–20 August
Scorecard

(H) Lancashire	v	Worcestershire
282 (69.5 overs); Steven Croft 107 (111); Gareth Andrew 3/47 (16.5 overs)		202 (68.5 overs); Ben Scott 65* (117); Glen Chapple 4/47 (15 overs)
248 (72.4 overs); Karl Brown 85 (147); Gareth Andrew 5/59 (19 overs)		230 (85.2 overs); Vikram Solanki 107 (175); Tom Smith 4/32 (14.2 overs)

Lancashire won by 98 runs
Stanley Park, Blackpool
Umpires: Michael Gough and Ian Gould

- Worcestershire won the toss and elected to field
- Points: Lancashire 21, Worcestershire 4

17–20 August
Scorecard

(H) Somerset	v	Nottinghamshire
177 (54.4 overs); Jos Buttler 43 (55); Andre Adams 6/33 (16.4 overs)		402/9 (88.2 overs); Samit Patel 128 (163); Charl Willoughby 4/76 (16.2 overs)

Match drawn
County Ground, Taunton
Umpires: Martin Bodenham and Richard Illingworth

- Nottinghamshire won the toss and elected to field
- Points: Nottinghamshire 11, Somerset 6

17–20 August
Scorecard

(H) Yorkshire	v	Sussex
398 (117.1 overs); Michael Yardy 130 (288); Ryan Sidebottom 5/53 (27 overs)		388 (122 overs); Joe Root 160 (290); Amjad Khan 4/70 (28 overs)
333/6d (87 overs); Michael Yardy 122 (122); Adil Rashid 4/121 (31 overs)		312/6 (54 overs); Jacques Rudolph 120 (125); Amjad Khan 2/15 (3 overs)

Match drawn
North Marine Road Ground, Scarborough
Umpires: Nick Cook and Trevor Jesty

- Sussex won the toss and elected to bat
- Points: Yorkshire 9, Sussex 9

18–21 August
Scorecard

Hampshire	v	Warwickshire (H)
141 (46.4 overs); Sean Ervine 36 (66); Chris Woakes 7/20 (14.4 overs)		250 (86.2 overs); Chris Woakes 64 (118); James Tomlinson 3/71 (19.2 overs)
416 (92.3 overs); James Vince 145 (166); Boyd Rankin 4/99 (17.3 overs)		99 (39.2 overs); Chris Woakes 23* (74); James Tomlinson 4/13 (9 overs)

Hampshire won by 209 runs
Edgbaston, Birmingham
Umpires: Nigel Cowley and Peter Willey

- Warwickshire won the toss and elected to field
- Points: Hampshire 19, Warwickshire 5

22–25 August
Scorecard

(H) Nottinghamshire	v	Durham
270 (71.3 overs); Alexander Hales 115 (175); Mitchell Claydon 3/84 (17 overs)		195 (55.2 overs); Ian Blackwell 52 (54); Andre Adams 3/61 (18 overs)
245 (49.4 overs); Rikki Wessels 84 (68); Mitchell Claydon 5/54 (13 overs)		253 (76.5 overs); Mark Stoneman 74 (154); Graeme White 4/72 (19.5 overs)

Nottinghamshire won by 67 runs
Trent Bridge, Nottingham
Umpires: Michael Gough and Neil Mallender

- Nottinghamshire won the toss and elected to bat
- Points: Nottinghamshire 21, Durham 3

23–26 August
Scorecard

(H) Hampshire	v	Worcestershire
179 (54.5 overs); Chris Wood 36 (53); Gareth Andrew 3/28 (10 overs)		204 (80.2 overs); Vikram Solanki 79* (156); Imran Tahir 5/29 (11.2 overs)
157/6 dec (46 overs); Chris Wood 56* (42); Gareth Andrew 3/53 (13 overs)

Match drawn
The Rose Bowl, Southampton
Umpires: Nigel Llong and Martin Saggers

- Hampshire won the toss and elected to bat
- Points: Hampshire 6, Worcestershire 7

23–26 August
Scorecard

(H) Yorkshire	v	Warwickshire
297 (94.2 overs); Gary Ballance 57 (103); Keith Barker 4/73 (23 overs)		482 (138.3 overs); Shivnarine Chanderpaul 193 (306); Joe Root 3/33 (9.3 overs)
127 (37.5 overs); Rich Pyrah 28 (17); Chris Wright 5/31 (11 overs)

Warwickshire won by an innings and 58 runs
Headingley, Leeds
Umpires: Stephen Gale and David Millns

- Yorkshire won the toss and elected to bat
- Points: Yorkshire 4, Warwickshire 23

31 August–3 September
Scorecard

(H) Somerset	v	Hampshire
204 (58.3 overs); Murali Kartik 59* (83); James Tomlinson 3/40 (16 overs)		627/9d James Adams 204 (410); Charl Willoughby 3/118 (31 overs)
362 (90 overs); Alfonso Thomas 94 (141); Imran Tahir 4/125 (30 overs)

Hampshire won by an innings and 61 runs
County Ground, Taunton
Umpires: Neil Bainton and Martin Saggers

- Hampshire won the toss and elected to field
- Points: Hampshire 23, Somerset 2

31 August–3 September
Scorecard

Durham	v	Sussex (H)
372 (99.1 overs); Mark Stoneman 128 (254); James Anyon 3/111 (22 overs)		218 (59.3 overs); Michael Yardy 66 (112); Scott Borthwick 5/80 (19 overs)
366/7 dec (94 overs); Will Smith 100 (204); Chris Nash 4/103 (27 overs)		312 (74.1 overs); Ed Joyce 57 (80); Ian Blackwell 5/102 (26.1 overs)

Durham won by 208 runs
County Ground, Hove
Umpires: Stephen Gale and Jeremy Lloyds

- Durham won the toss and elected to bat
- Points: Sussex 4, Durham 23

31 August–3 September
Scorecard

Yorkshire	v	Warwickshire (H)
281 (106.5 overs); Joe Sayers 84 (193); Rikki Clarke 4/55 (19.5 overs)		318 (96 overs); Shivnarine Chanderpaul 110 (182); Ryan Sidebottom 5/43 (21 overs)
385/8 dec (99 overs); Gary Ballance 111 (159); Chris Wright 4/102 (26 overs)		214/3 (57.2 overs); Jim Troughton 62* (93); Steven Patterson 1/20 (8 overs)

Match drawn
Edgbaston, Birmingham
Umpires: Jeff Evans & Peter Hartley

- Warwickshire won the toss and elected to field
- Points: Warwickshire 9, Yorkshire 8

31 August–1 September
Scorecard

Lancashire	v	Worcestershire (H)
161 (35.2 overs); Kyle Hogg 46 (43); Gareth Andrew 3/37 (6 overs)		237 (71.4 overs); James Cameron 98 (207); Glen Chapple 4/58 (21.5 overs)
80 (30.1 overs); Paul Horton 21 (29); Alan Richardson 6/22 (15 overs)		5/0 (0.3 overs); Daryl Mitchell 4* (3)

Worcestershire won by 10 wickets
New Road, Worcester
Umpires: Tim Robinson and Peter Willey

- Lancashire won the toss and elected to bat
- Points: Worcestershire 20, Lancashire 3

==== September ====
7–10 September
Scorecard

(H) Lancashire	v	Hampshire
388 (107.3 overs); Glen Chapple 97 (117); Sean Ervine 3/66 (14 overs)		381 (128.4 overs); Sean Ervine 128 (212); Gary Keedy 5/93 (37 overs)
353/3 dec (77 overs); Stephen Moore 169 (230); Danny Briggs 2/125 (28 overs)		138 (84.2 overs); Neil McKenzie 38 (186); Simon Kerrigan 9/51 (37.2 overs)

Lancashire won by 222 runs
Aigburth, Liverpool
Umpires: Peter Hartley and John Steele

- Hampshire won the toss and elected to field
- Points: Lancashire 22, Hampshire 6

7–10 September
Scorecard

(H) Warwickshire	v	Nottinghamshire
574/7 dec (144 overs); Ian Westwood 171 (307); Darren Pattinson 2/65 (20 overs)		238 (69.1 overs); Alexander Hales 72 (113); Chris Woakes 4/91 (23 overs)
		222 (60.4 overs) (f/o); Alexander Hales 106* (172); Chris Wright 5/74 (23 overs)

Warwickshire won by an innings and 114 runs
Edgbaston, Birmingham
Umpires: Nick Cook and Steve O'Shaughnessy

- Warwickshire won the toss and elected to bat
- Points: Warwickshire 22, Nottinghamshire 2

7–10 September
Scorecard

Sussex	v	Worcestershire (H)
375 (115.3 overs); Ben Brown 71 (151); Moeen Ali 4/53 (24.3 overs)		222 (70 overs); Alexei Kervezee 69 (89); Monty Panesar 5/58 (27 overs)
267/4 dec (70.2 overs); Joe Gatting 116* (198); Alan Richardson 3/77 (19 overs)		169 (56.3 overs); Daryl Mitchell 61 (106); James Anyon 4/55 (16.3 overs)

Sussex won by 251 runs
County Ground, Worcester, Worcester
Umpires: Martin Bodenham and David Millns

- Sussex won the toss and elected to bat
- Points: Worcestershire 4, Sussex 23

7–10 September
Scorecard

Somerset	v	Yorkshire (H)
265 (74 overs); Alex Barrow 69 (143); Ryan Sidebottom 4/61 (19 overs)		195 (57.4 overs); Adam Lyth 52 (89); Alfonso Thomas 5/66 (22.4 overs)
132 (48.5 overs); Craig Meschede 33 (79); Ryan Sidebottom 7/37 (13.5 overs)		205/4 (59.3 overs); Jonny Bairstow 53* (63); Murali Kartik 2/44 (18 overs)

Yorkshire won by 6 wickets
Headingley, Leeds
Umpires: Trevor Jesty and Tim Robinson

- Yorkshire won the toss and elected to field
- Points: Yorkshire 19, Somerset 5

12–15 September
Scorecard

(H) Durham	v	Worcestershire
264 (83.4 overs); Will Smith 66 (152); Alan Richardson 3/46 (24.4 overs)		288 (85.3 overs); Vikram Solanki 124 (215); Callum Thorp 4/52 (23.3 overs)
388 (96.1 overs); Mark Stoneman 75 (109); Gareth Andrew 4/72 (15 overs)		213 (48.4 overs); James Cameron; 47 (100)

Durham won by 151 runs
Riverside Ground, Chester-le-Street
Umpires: Jeff Evans and Trevor Jesty

- Durham won the toss and elected to bat
- Points: Durham 21, Worcestershire 5

12–15 September
Scorecard

(H) Hampshire	v	Warwickshire
324 (96.0 overs); Liam Dawson 152 (267); Chris Metters 3–71 (25.0 overs)		493 (156.1 overs); Shivnarine Chanderpaul 171 (295); Dimitri Mascarenhas 3–52 (34.0 overs)
327/7 (103 overs) (f/o); Neil McKenzie 115 (233); Chris Metters 5–115 (40.0 overs)

Match drawn
The Rose Bowl, Southampton
Umpires: Michael Gough and Jeremy Lloyds

- Warwickshire won the toss and elected to bat
- Points: Warwickshire 9, Hampshire 7

12–15 September
Scorecard

Sussex	v	Nottinghamshire (H)
488 (146.5 overs); Murray Goodwin 170 (329); Andre Adams 5/110 (37.5 overs)		311 (101.2 overs); Karl Turner 64 (166); Monty Panesar 3/60 (21.2 overs)
172 (42.1 overs); Karl Turner 42 (69); Naved Arif 4/41 (12 overs)

Sussex won by an innings and 5 runs
Trent Bridge, Nottingham
Umpires: Rob Bailey and Tim Robinson

- Nottinghamshire won the toss and elected to field
- Points: Nottinghamshire 5, Sussex 23

12–15 September
Scorecard

(H) Somerset	v	Lancashire
380 (125.4 overs); James Hildreth 186 (307); Gary Keedy 4/57 (28 overs)		480 (126.2 overs); Stephen Moore 68 (147); Murali Kartik 5/137 (45.2 overs)
310 (106.4 overs Peter Trego 120 (217); Glen Chapple 3/53 (19.0 overs)		213/2 (29.1 overs); Stephen Moore 71 (55); Craig Meschede 1/24 (3.1 overs)

Lancashire won by 8 wickets
County Ground, Taunton
Umpires: Peter Willey and George Sharp

- Somerset won the toss and elected to bat
- Points: Lancashire 23, Somerset 5

=== Division Two ===
==== April ====
8–11 April
Scorecard

Kent	v	Essex (H)
247 (70 overs); Sam Northeast 112 (170); Maurice Chambers 3/51 (18 overs)		201 (76 overs); James Foster 88* (161); Darren Stevens 6/60 (27 overs)
238 (74.4 overs); Martin van Jaarsveld 63 (113); Reece Topley 5/46 (17.4 overs)		227 (70.1 overs); Billy Godleman 58 (97); Robbie Joseph 4/25 (13.1 overs)

Kent won by 57 runs
County Ground, Chelmsford
Umpires: Richard Illingworth and Trevor Jesty

- Kent won the toss and elected to bat
- Points: Kent 20, Essex 4

8–11 April
Scorecard

(H) Gloucestershire	v	Derbyshire
343 (137.2 overs); Will Gidman 89 (176); Jonathan Clare 4/84 (27.2 overs)		157 (41 overs); Luke Sutton 35 (63); Liam Norwell 6/46 (11 overs)
331 (97.5 overs); Greg Smith 130 (141); David Payne 5/76 (16.5 overs)		146/3 (41.3 overs); Alex Gidman 70* (75); Tim Groenewald 2/25 (11 overs)

Gloucestershire won by 7 wickets
County Ground, Bristol
Umpires: Peter Hartley and Martin Saggers

- Gloucestershire won the toss and elected to bat
- Points: Gloucestershire 21, Derbyshire 3

8–11 April
Scorecard

(H) Leicestershire	v	Glamorgan
238 (101.2 overs); Claude Henderson 80* (160); Dean Cosker 4/41 (30 overs)		146 (55.3 overs); Alviro Petersen 91 (165); Matthew Hoggard 3/28 (12 overs)
245 (91.3 overs); Will Jefferson 112 (213); Dean Cosker 4/50 (27.3 overs)		248 (87.1 overs); Ben Wright 65 (102); Jigar Naik 5/36 (16.1 overs)

Leicestershire won by 89 runs
Grace Road, Leicester
Umpires: Martin Bodenham and Richard Kettleborough

- Leicestershire won the toss and elected to bat
- Points: Leicestershire 20, Glamorgan 3

8–11 April
Scorecard

(H) Surrey	v	Northamptonshire
322 (90 overs); Rory Hamilton-Brown 74 (111); Lee Daggett 3/63 (17 overs)		376 (130.5 overs); James Middlebrook 103 (191); Tim Linley 4/53 (26 overs)
342/6d (97 overs); Zander de Bruyn 91* (178); Lee Daggett 3/69 (22 overs)		211/5 (62 overs); Alex Wakely 43 (71); Stuart Meaker 3/46 (13 overs)

Match drawn
The Oval, London
Umpires: Jeff Evans and Steve Garratt

- Surrey won the toss and elected to bat
- Points: Northamptonshire 9, Surrey 8

14–17 April
Scorecard

(H) Glamorgan	v	Gloucestershire
202 (47.5 overs); Ben Wright 83 (98); Ian Saxelby 5/53 (14 overs)		188 (89.1 overs); Jon Lewis 56 (105); James Harris 5/39 (25.1 overs)
370/9d (114 overs); Gareth Rees 68 (89); Will Gidman 3/49 (20 overs)		195 (92.4 overs); Chris Taylor 83 (165); Adam Shantry 3/42 (19 overs)

Glamorgan won by 189 runs
SWALEC Stadium, Cardiff
Umpires: Neil Bainton and Nick Cook

- Glamorgan won the toss and elected to bat
- Points: Glamorgan 20, Gloucestershire 3

14–17 April
Scorecard

Leicestershire	v	Derbyshire (H)
230 (61.2 overs); Claude Henderson 77 (73); Tim Groenewald 5/59 (15 overs)		439/9d (125.3 overs); Wayne Madsen 106 (233); Nathan Buck 4/112 (31.3 overs)
177 (56 overs); Will Jefferson 41 (67); Tim Groenewald 3/38 (14 overs)

Derbyshire won by an innings and 32 runs
County Ground, Derby
Umpires: Andy Hicks and Jeremy Lloyds

- Derbyshire won the toss and elected to field
- Points: Derbyshire 23, Leicestershire 3

14–17 April
Scorecard

(H) Middlesex	v	Essex
277 (78.4 overs); Scott Newman 38 (73); Reece Topley 5/64 (14.4 overs)		115 (33.2 overs); Tom Westley 36 (51); Tim Murtagh 4/48 (10 overs)
54/2 (10.5 overs); Scott Newman 38* (31); David Masters 2/19 (5 overs)		215 (60.4 overs) (f/o); Tom Westley 59 (98); Gareth Berg 4/31 (10 overs)

Middlesex won by 8 wickets
Lord's, London
Umpires: Martin Bodenham and Nigel Llong

- Essex won the toss and elected to field
- Points: Middlesex 21, Essex 3

14–17 April
Scorecard

Kent	v	Northamptonshire (H)
202 (55.1 overs); Rob Key 46 (102); Chaminda Vaas 3/70 (19 overs)		480 (157.4 overs); Andrew Hall 146 (297); Simon Cook 3/72 (29.4 overs)
119 (36.2 overs); James Tredwell 35 (59); Jack Brooks 4/36 (13 overs)

Northamptonshire won by an innings and 159 runs
County Ground, Northampton
Umpires: George Sharp and John Steele

- Kent won the toss and elected to bat
- Points: Northamptonshire 22, Kent 3

20–23 April
Scorecard

(H) Derbyshire	v	Middlesex
154 (61.2 overs); Ross Whiteley 28 (68); Gareth Berg 4/18 (13 overs)		230 (73.5 overs); Chris Rogers 70 (113); Tony Palladino 5/39 (17 overs)
403 110.1 overs); Wes Durston 96 (142); Steven Finn 3/55 (25.1 overs)		329/7 (93.2 overs); Gareth Berg 80 (115); Tony Palladino 4/85 (27 overs)

Middlesex won by 3 wickets
County Ground, Derby
Umpires: Stephen Gale and George Sharp

- Derbyshire won the toss and elected to bat
- Points: Middlesex 20, Derbyshire 3

20–23 April
Scorecard

Surrey	v	Glamorgan (H)
575/7d (160 overs); Zander de Bruyn 172 (311); Dean Cosker 3/168 (47 overs)		395 (127.1 overs); Mark Wallace 55 (86); Stuart Meaker 5/86 (23.1 overs)
		198/4d (69 overs) (f/o); Gareth Rees 89 (210); Gareth Batty 3/57 (22 overs)

Match drawn
SWALEC Stadium, Cardiff
Umpires: Ian Gould and Andy Hicks

- Surrey won the toss and elected to bat
- Points: Surrey 9, Glamorgan 8

20–23 April
Scorecard

Essex	v	Northamptonshire (H)
433 (122.2 overs); Alastair Cook (155 (235); Chaminda Vaas 5/76 (32 overs)		538/9d (154 overs); Stephen Peters 105 (167); Ravi Bopara 2/96 (31 overs)
229/4d (84 overs); Mark Pettini 67* (159); Lee Daggett 1/26 (10 overs)

Match drawn
County Ground, Northampton
Umpires: Nick Cook and Tim Robinson

- Essex won the toss and elected to bat
- Points: Northamptonshire 9, Essex 9

26–29 April
Scorecard

Glamorgan	v	Essex (H)
282 (83 overs); William Bragg 55 (91); Maurice Chambers 3/63 (17 overs)		258 (84.3 overs); Ravi Bopara 61 (104); Dean Cosker 4/35 (21 overs)
335 (98.2 overs); Mark Wallace 82 (96); David Masters 5/73 (27.2 overs)		360/4 (100.5 overs); Ravi Bopara 136* (231); Dean Cosker 2/108 (40 overs)

Essex won by 6 wickets
County Ground, Chelmsford
Umpires: Martin Saggers and Peter Willey

- Essex won the toss and elected to field
- Points: Essex 21, Glamorgan 5

26–29 April
Scorecard

Gloucestershire	v	Kent (H)
292 (97.3 overs); Hamish Marshall 72 (131); Simon Cook 3/40 (14.3 overs)		208 (68.1 overs); Adam Ball 46 (104); Jon Lewis 3/33 (15.1 overs)
206 (85.3 overs); Will Gidman 34 (79); Azhar Mahmood 4/56 (25.3 overs)		245 (79.3 overs); Azhar Mahmood 70 (119); Will Gidman 3/37 (13.3 overs)

Gloucestershire won by 45 runs
St Lawrence Ground, Canterbury
Umpires: Stephen Gale and Trevor Jesty

- Gloucestershire won the toss and elected to bat
- Points: Gloucestershire 21, Kent 4

27–30 April
Scorecard

Derbyshire	v	Leicestershire (H)
305 (123.5 overs); Dan Redfern 71 (191); Matthew Hoggard 4/78 (22 overs)		507/5d (156 overs); Will Jefferson 133 (253); Jonathan Clare 2/61 (18 overs)
236/9 (116 overs); Greg Smith 52 (89); Jigar Naik 3/68 (31 overs)

Match drawn
Grace Road, Leicester
Umpires: Ismail Dawood and Nigel Llong

- Derbyshire won the toss and elected to bat
- Points: Leicestershire 8, Derbyshire 6

27–30 April
Scorecard

(H) Middlesex	v	Surrey
445 (118.3 overs); Neil Dexter 145 (223); Gareth Batty 5/76 (27.3 overs)		203 (56.3 overs); Tom Maynard 98* (150); Ollie Rayner 3/31 (12.3 overs)
		200 (73.3 overs) (f/o); Steve Davies 94 (176); Toby Roland-Jones 4/38 (14.3 overs)

Middlesex won by an innings and 42 runs
Lord's, London
Umpires: Nigel Cowley and Neil Mallender

- Surrey won the toss and elected to field
- Points: Middlesex 24, Surrey 3

==== May ====
4–7 May
Scorecard

(H) Gloucestershire	v	Middlesex
358 (103.3 overs); Chris Taylor 117 (147); Toby Roland-Jones 5/91 (20 overs)		406 (104.4 overs); Chris Rogers 87 (123); Jon Lewis 5/65 (23.4 overs)
347 (96.2 overs); Will Gidman 93 (184); Corey Collymore 4/57 (16.2 overs)		123/4 (30 overs); Dan Housego 45 (73); Jon Lewis 3/35 (11 overs)

Match drawn
County Ground, Bristol
Umpires: Mark Benson and Nick Cook

- Gloucestershire won the toss and elected to bat
- Points: Middlesex 11, Gloucestershire 10

4–7 May
Scorecard

(H) Kent	v	Northamptonshire
280 (89.5 overs); Martin van Jaarsveld 67 (111); James Middlebrook 3/42 (12 overs)		493 (133.1 overs); Andrew Hall 100 (232); Adam Riley 4/145 (34 overs)
320 (81.2 overs); Darren Stevens 143 (137); Jack Brooks 3/56 (17.2 overs)		108/5 (24.4 overs); Rob White 40 (34); James Tredwell 3/44 (9.4 overs)

Northamptonshire won by 5 wickets
St Lawrence Ground, Canterbury
Umpires: Rob Bailey and Nigel Cowley

- Kent won the toss and elected to bat
- Points: Northamptonshire 24, Kent 4

4–7 May
Scorecard

(H) Surrey	v	Leicestershire
294 (73.1 overs); Tom Maynard 70 (73); Claude Henderson 3/41 (12.1 overs)		183 (57 overs); Wayne White 46 (78); Stuart Meaker 4/43 (14 overs)
311/6d (70.4 overs); Mark Ramprakash 91 (142); Claude Henderson 4/91 (25.4 overs)		207 (69.1 overs); James Taylor 52 (145); Jade Dernbach 5/41 (19.1 overs)

Surrey won by 215 runs
The Oval, London
Umpires: Martin Bodenham and Peter Hartley

- Leicestershire won the toss and elected to field
- Points: Surrey 21, Leicestershire 3

10–13 May
Scorecard

Essex	v	Derbyshire (H)
179 (75.1 overs); James Foster 62 (146); Azeem Rafiq 3/24 (16 overs)		288 (86.4 overs); Wayne Madsen 51 (132); David Masters 5/71 (30.4 overs)
331 (117.5 overs); Ravi Bopara 119 (188); Greg Smith 4/63 (27.5 overs)		202/6 (48.1 overs); Wes Durston 90* (101); David Masters 3/52 (17.1 overs)

Match drawn
County Ground, Derby
Umpires: Peter Hartley and David Millns

- Derbyshire won the toss and elected to field
- Points: Derbyshire 8, Essex 6

10–13 May
Scorecard

Kent	v	Glamorgan (H)
242 (66.1 overs); Darren Stevens 66 (81); Will Owen 3/37 (13.1 overs)		434 (117.3 overs); Mark Wallace 107 (187); James Tredwell 4/121 (35.3 overs)
184 (42.3 overs); Alex Blake 51 (62); James Harris 3/43 (11.3 overs)

Glamorgan won by an innings and 8 runs
SWALEC Stadium, Cardiff
Umpires: Nick Cook and Steve Garratt

- Glamorgan won the toss and elected to field
- Points: Glamorgan 24, Kent 3

11–14 May
Scorecard

Northamptonshire	v	Gloucestershire (H)
557/9d (140.4 overs); Niall O'Brien 166 (206); Ian Saxelby 3/117 (29.4 overs)		288 (81.2 overs); Will Gidman 116* (207); Jack Brooks 4/54 (21 overs)
		263 (78.2 overs) (f/o); Will Gidman 81* (111); Lee Daggett 3/42 (18.2 overs)

Northamptonshire won by an innings and 6 runs
County Ground, Bristol
Umpires: Richard Illingworth and Steve O'Shaughnessy

- Northamptonshire won the toss and elected to bat
- Points: Northamptonshire 24, Gloucestershire 4

18–21 May
Scorecard

Gloucestershire	v	Leicestershire (H)
504/9d (138 overs); Alex Gidman 168 (244); Jigar Naik 4/91 (27 overs)		323 (106.4 overs); Matthew Boyce 119 (251); Ian Saxelby 4/69 (23.3 overs)
		245/5 (77 overs) (f/o); Paul Dixey 72* (112); Will Gidman 3/29 (11 overs)

Match drawn
Grace Road, Leicester
Umpires: Trevor Jesty and George Sharp

- Gloucestershire won the toss and elected to bat
- Points: Gloucestershire 11, Leicestershire 7

18–21 May
Scorecard

Essex	v	Surrey (H)
548 (128.3 overs); Graham Napier 196 (130); Stuart Meaker 4/113 (29.3 overs)		506 (120 overs); Rory Hamilton-Brown 159 (195); David Masters 3/77 (28 overs)
324 (105.5 overs); Alastair Cook 64 (114); Gareth Batty 3/75 (33 overs)		65/1 (14 overs); Rory Hamilton-Brown 34* (39); Maurice Chambers 1/16 (4 overs)

Match drawn
Whitgift School, Croydon
Umpires: Richard Kettleborough and Graham Lloyd

- Surrey won the toss and elected to field.
- Points: Surrey 10, Essex 9

19–22 May
Scorecard

(H) Middlesex	v	Glamorgan
150 (51.4 overs); Jamie Dalrymple 44 (91); James Harris 5/41 (16 overs)		522 (143.2 overs); Ben Wright 101 (128); Tim Murtagh 3/102 (30 overs)
398 (128.3 overs); Chris Rogers 125 (249); James Harris 3/77 (21 overs)		28/1 (4.3 overs); Alviro Petersen 23* (11); Corey Collymore 1/0 (2 overs)

Glamorgan won by 9 wickets
Lord's, London
Umpires: Jeremy Lloyds and Martin Saggers

- Middlesex won the toss and elected to bat
- Points: Glamorgan 24, Middlesex 1

24–27 May
Scorecard

Middlesex	v	Essex (H)
385 (114.1 overs); Sam Robson 146 (317); Graham Napier 5/56 (26 overs)		291 (96.5 overs); Owais Shah 96 (172); Tim Murtagh 5/82 (26 overs)
211/6d (51 overs); Neil Dexter 73* (86); David Masters 4/61 (18 overs)		196/7 (54.4 overs); Adam Wheater 76 (83); Tim Murtagh 3/9 (5.2 overs)

Match drawn
County Ground, Chelmsford
Umpires: John Steele and Peter Willey

- Middlesex won the toss and elected to bat
- Points: Middlesex 10, Essex 7

24–27 May
Scorecard

Derbyshire	v	Kent (H)
460 (127.1 overs); Wayne Madsen 140 (251); Ashley Shaw 5/118 (26.1 overs)		352 (95.5 overs); Martin van Jaarsveld 95 (140); Tim Groenewald 4/64 (27 overs)
256/4d Wayne Madsen 71 (111); Neil Saker 1/28 (7 overs)		94/2 (25.5 overs); Rob Key 59* (78); Tony Palladino 1/17 (5 overs)

Match drawn
St Lawrence Ground, Canterbury
Umpires: Jeff Evans and Peter Hartley

- Derbyshire won the toss and elected to bat
- Points: Derbyshire 11, Kent 9

24–27 May
Scorecard

Leicestershire	v	Northamptonshire (H)
313 (81.4 overs); Andrew McDonald 162 (140); Jack Brooks 5/80 (20.4 overs)		312 (88 overs); Alex Wakely 98 (165); Andrew McDonald 3/51 (14 overs)
268/3d (86 overs); Matthew Boyce 101 (173); James Middlebrook 2/58 (20 overs)

Match drawn
County Cricket Ground, Northampton, Northampton
Umpires: Stephen Gale and Jeremy Lloyds

- Leicestershire won the toss and elected to bat
- Points: Northamptonshire 9, Leicestershire 9

24–27 May
Scorecard

Glamorgan	v	Surrey (H)
419 (123.1 overs); Alviro Petersen 210 (352); Chris Jordan 3/81 (23 overs)		284 (78.1 overs); Steve Davies 77 (126); Chris Ashling 4/47 (18 overs)
259/4d (56.2 overs); Gareth Rees 126 (173); Jason Roy 2/29 (3.2 overs)		194/1 (35 overs); Jason Roy 106* (109); Robert Croft 1/32 (8 overs)

Match drawn
The Oval, London
Umpires: Mark Benson and Steve O'Shaughnessy

- Glamorgan won the toss and elected to bat
- Points: Glamorgan 10, Surrey 7

29 May–1 June
Scorecard

(H) Derbyshire	v	Surrey
400/9d (104.1 overs); Chesney Hughes 124 (210); Tim Linley 6/81 (29 overs)		358 (70.2 overs); Steve Davies 78 (103); Steffan Jones 3/56 (14 overs)
99 (30.3 overs); Wes Durston 17 (28); Matt Dunn 5/56 (12 overs)		142/3 (26.4 overs); Jason Roy 45 (31); Greg Smith 2/26 (6 overs)

Surrey won by 7 wickets
County Ground, Derby
Umpires: Michael Gough and Trevor Jesty

- Surrey won the toss and elected to field
- Points: Surrey 23, Derbyshire 8

29 May–1 June
Scorecard

(H) Gloucestershire	v	Essex
255 (87.4 overs); Ed Young 51* (126); David Masters 5/48 (24.4 overs)		321 (89 overs); Adam Wheater 69 (86); Jon Lewis 4/65 (22 overs)
310/8d (88 overs); Chris Dent 70* (131); David Masters 3/61 (27 overs)

Match drawn
County Ground, Bristol
Umpires: Jeff Evans and Steve Garratt

- Essex won the toss and elected to field
- Points: Essex 9, Gloucestershire 8

29 May–1 June
Scorecard

(H) Kent	v	Leicestershire
459 (118.4 overs); Joe Denly 143 (247); Wayne White 4/66 (19.4 overs)		251 (77.5 overs); Will Jefferson 77 (101); James Tredwell 5/55 (24 overs)
362 (100.1 overs); James Taylor 96 (145); Robbie Joseph 4/74 (17 overs)		157/5 (43.1 overs); Joe Denly 74 (102); Claude Henderson 4/61 (14 overs)

Kent won by 5 wickets
Nevill Ground, Royal Tunbridge Wells
Umpires: Neil Bainton and Peter Willey

- Ken won the toss and elected to bat
- Points: Kent 24, Leicestershire 3

29 May–1 June
Scorecard

(H) Northamptonshire	v	Glamorgan
461/6d (125 overs); Rob White 140 (296); Dean Cosker 2/85 (28 overs)		72 (29 overs); Alviro Petersen 18 (30 overs); Chaminda Vaas 5/22 (10 overs)
212 (66.3 overs); William Bragg 52 (87 overs); Chaminda Vaas 5/60 (21.3 overs)

Northamptonshire won by an innings and 177 runs
County Ground, Northampton
Umpires: Rob Bailey and Richard Illingworth

- Northamptonshire won the toss and elected to bat
- Points: Northamptonshire 24, Glamorgan 1

==== June ====
19–22 June
Scorecard

(H) Leicestershire	v	Northamptonshire
168 (55.5 overs); Wayne White 54 (84); Lee Daggett 4/35 (14 overs)		371/9 dec (124 overs); Stephen Peters 96 (189); Matthew Hoggard 4/66 (25 overs)
48 (25.1 overs); Matthew Boyce 12 (39); David Lucas 5/20 (13 overs)

Northamptonshire won by an innings and 155 runs
Grace Road, Leicester
Umpires: Mark Benson and Jeff Evans

- Leicestershire won the toss and elected to bat
- Points: Northamptonshire 22, Leicestershire 2

19–22 June
Scorecard

Kent	v	Middlesex (H)
87 (31.4 overs); Azhar Mahmood 32 (41); Tim Murtagh 5/27 (9 overs)		153 (44.3 overs); Sam Robson 40 (65); Azhar Mahmood 6/36 (16.3 overs)
232 (63.4 overs); Simon Cook 51 (90); Tim Murtagh 4/83 (18 overs)		168/1 (37.4 overs); Sam Robson 94* (121); Joe Denly 1/34 (5 overs)

Middlesex won by 9 wickets
Lord's, London
Umpires: Steve Garratt and Nigel Llong

- Middlesex won the toss and elected to field
- Points: Middlesex 19, Kent 3

19–22 June
Scorecard

(H) Surrey	v	Gloucestershire
225 (52.4 overs); Zander de Bruyn 66 (90); Ian Saxelby 4/73 (16.4 overs)		261 (83.2 overs); Chris Taylor 52 (70); Zander de Bruyn 3/39 (12 overs)
195 (57.3 overs); Mark Ramprakash 75 (138); Ian Saxelby 6/69 (15 overs)		161/6 (48.2 overs); Alex Gidman 76 (111); Yasir Arafat 3/49 (14 overs)

Gloucestershire won by 4 wickets
The Oval, London
Umpires: Rob Bailey and Michael Gough

- Gloucestershire won the toss and elected to field
- Points: Gloucestershire 21, Surrey 4

25–28 June
Scorecard

(H) Essex	v	Northamptonshire
183 (52 overs); Tom Westley 61 (97); Chaminda Vaas 6/46 (17 overs)		99 (51.4 overs); David Lucas 21 (46); David Masters 4/28 (22 overs)
331/9d (71 overs); Adam Wheater 164 (143); Jack Brooks 4/58 (13 overs)		244 (84 overs); Rob White 43 (65); Tom Craddock 4/70 (30 overs)

Essex won by 171 runs
County Ground, Chelmsford
Umpires: Ismail Dawood and Peter Hartley

- Essex won the toss and elected to bat
- Points: Essex 19, Northamptonshire 3

27–30 June
Scorecard

Derbyshire	v	Glamorgan (H)
367 (104 overs); Wes Durston 106 (145); Jim Allenby 5/44 (20 overs)		213 (64.2 overs); Alviro Petersen 93 (172); Jonathan Clare 5/50 (15 overs)
131/4 (27 overs); Martin Guptill 70* (72); Will Owen 2/24 (7 overs)		283 (87.4 overs) (f/o); Mike Powell 87 (171); Tony Palladino 4/50 (18.4 overs)

Derbyshire won by 6 wickets
SWALEC Stadium, Cardiff
Umpires: David Millns and John Steele

- Derbyshire won the toss and elected to bat
- Points: Derbyshire 23, Glamorgan 4

27–30 June
Scorecard

Gloucestershire	v	Middlesex (H)
459/9d (117 overs); Ian Cockbain 127 (233); Corey Collymore 4/80 (29 overs)		325 (97.5 overs); Chris Rogers 148 (263); Will Gidman 2/19 (9 overs)
229/8d 55 overs); Kane Williamson 73 (98); Tim Murtagh 3/28 (10 overs)

Match drawn
Uxbridge Cricket Club Ground
Umpires: Neil Baonton and Nigel Cowley

- Gloucestershire won the toss and elected to bat
- Points: Gloucestershire 11, Middlesex 8

==== July ====
10–13 July
Scorecard

Essex	v	Leicestershire (H)
322 (113.4 overs); James Foster 117* (224); Nadeem Malik 3/22 (26.4 overs)		274 (84 overs); Will Jefferson 61 (84); David Masters 5/67 (24 overs)
344/5d (87 overs); Billy Godleman 130 (253); Jigar Naik 4/89 (20 overs)		138 (49.2 overs); Matthew Boyce 26 (60); Tymal Mills 3/48 (10 overs)

Essex won by 254 runs
Grace Road, Leicester
Umpires: Steve O'Shaughnessy and John Steele

- Essex won the toss and elected to bat
- Points: Essex 22, Leicestershire 4

10–13 July
Scorecard

(H) Surrey	v	Kent
387 (83 overs); Mark Ramprakash 179 (200); Joe Denly 3/71 (19 overs)		250 (66.4 overs); Alex Blake 96 (126); Tim Linley 3/52 (15 overs)
184 (58.3 overs); Steve Davies 39 (44); David Balcombe 5/63 (21.3 overs)		300 (98.2 overs); Rob Key 162 (289); Tim Linley 4/48 (23 overs)

Surrey won by 21 runs
The Oval, London
Umpires: Nick Cook and Peter Hartley

- Surrey won the toss and elected to bat
- Points: Surrey 23, Kent 5

11–14 July
Scorecard

(H) Derbyshire	v	Glamorgan
360 (80.3 overs); Jonathan Clare 130 (144); Graham Wagg 3/58 (17 overs)		445 (102.5 overs); Jim Allenby 113 (170); Tony Palladino 3/85 (24 overs)
438 (111.3 overs); Chesney Hughes 167 (272); James Harris 4/123 (29 overs)		167 (40.4 overs); Gareth Rees 52 (84); Tony Palladino 5/53 (13 overs)

Derbyshire won by 186 runs
County Ground, Derby
Umpires: Shavir Tarapore (Ind) and Peter Willey

- Glamorgan won the toss and elected to field
- Points: Derbyshire 23, Glamorgan 8

20–23 July
Scorecard

Kent	v	Gloucestershire (H)
205 (63.3 overs); Darren Stevens 67 (138); Will Gidman 5/38 (14 overs)		515 (118.2 overs); Chris Taylor 196 (248); David Balcombe 5/103 (29.2 overs)
168 (42.5 overs); Simon Cook 46* (39); David Payne 4/60 (11.5 overs)

Gloucestershire won by an innings and 142 runs
College Ground, Cheltenham
Umpires: Martin Bodenham and Michael Gough

- Gloucestershire won the toss and elected to field
- Points: Gloucestershire 24, Kent 3

20–23 July
Scorecard

Derbyshire	v	Northamptonshire (H)
364 (101.2 overs); Ross Whiteley 103 (207); Chaminda Vaas 4/105 (24 overs)		275 (103.4 overs); Rob Newton 94 (114); Mark Turner 5/32 (17.4 overs)
268/4d (56.5 overs); Wes Durston 62 (74); Lee Daggett 2/60 (15 overs)		229/5 (69 overs); Andrew Hall 66* (128); Jonathan Clare 2/46 (10 overs)

Match drawn
County Ground, Northampton
Umpires: Nigel Cowley and Jeff Evans

- Northamptonshire won the toss and elected to field
- Points: Derbyshire 10, Northamptonshire 8

20–23 July
Scorecard

Middlesex	v	Surrey (H)
308 (86.2 overs); Jamie Dalrymple 122* (189); Tim Linley 3/60 (26.2 overs)		117 (36.1 overs); Steve Davies 27 (36); Tim Murtagh 5/30 (10 overs)
109/4 (50.5 overs); Sam Robson 94* (159); Zander de Bruyn 2/32 (10 overs)		379 (70.5 overs) (f/o); Tom Maynard 141 (101); Tim Murtagh 5/98 (19 overs)

Middlesex won by 6 wickets
Woodbridge Road, Guildford
Umpires: Tim Robinson and Shavir Tarapore

- Surrey won the toss and elected to field
- Points: Middlesex 22, Surrey 3

27–30 July
Scorecard

(H) Essex	v	Leicestershire
144 (60.1 overs); Ravi Bopara 37 (115); Claude Henderson 4/43 (18 overs)		202 (71.4 overs); Will Jefferson 39 (48); Tom Craddock 4/59 (20.4 overs)
372 (139.4 overs); Ravi Bopara 178 (374); Nadeem Malik 4/62 (28 overs)		34 (14.4 overs); Josh Cobb 13 (13); David Masters 8/10 (7.4 overs)

Essex won by 280 runs
Garon Park, Southend-on-Sea
Umpires: Michael Gough and Peter Willey

- Leicestershire won the toss and elected to field
- Points: Essex 19, Leicestershire 4

27–30 July
Scorecard

(H) Glamorgan	v	Northamptonshire
252 (67 overs); Stewart Walters 81* (132); James Middlebrook 4/63 (17 overs)		552/9d (167.3 overs); Stephen Peters 222 (390); Dean Cosker 3/99 (38 overs)
448 (139.3 overs); Stewart Walters 102 (171); James Middlebrook 5/127 (51.3 overs)		140/6 (23 overs); Alex Wakely 39 (26); Graham Wagg 2/19 (5 overs)

Match drawn
St Helen's, Swansea
Umpires: Stephen Gale and Peter Hartley

- Glamorgan won the toss and elected to bat
- Points: Glamorgan 6, Northamptonshire 10

27–30 July
Scorecard

(H) Gloucestershire	v	Surrey
286 (90.4 overs); Will Gidman 85 (160); Yasir Arafat 5/86 (24 overs)		423 (105.3 overs); Mark Ramprakash 141 (232); Jon Lewis 4/95 (24.3 overs)
320 (111.3 overs); Chris Dent 100 (205); Tim Linley 3/77 (29 overs)		186/8 (46.5 overs); Jason Roy 45 (64); Jon Lewis 3/61 (15 overs)

Surrey won by two wickets
College Ground, Cheltenham
Umpires: Nigel Llong and George Sharp

- Gloucestershire won the toss and elected to bat
- Points: Gloucestershire 5, Surrey 24

29 July–1 August
Scorecard

Derbyshire	v	Middlesex (H)
252 (67.2 overs); Wes Durston 61 (90); Tim Murtagh 4/45 (13 overs)		405 (126 overs); Dawid Malan 143 (262); Jonathan Clare 4/69 (20 overs)
243 (89.5 overs); Greg Smith 45 (58); Jamie Dalrymple 3/21 (10 overs)		91/3 (21.3 overs); Chris Rogers 46* (55); Tony Palladino 2/27 (8 overs)

Middlesex won by seven wickets
Lord's, London
Umpires: Neil Bainton and Richard Kettleborough

- Derbyshire won the toss and elected to bat
- Points: Middlesex 23, Derbyshire 4

==== August ====
2–5 August
Scorecard

(H) Glamorgan	v	Essex
399 (127.2 overs); Alviro Petersen 133 (228); Tom Craddock 4/89 (27.2 overs)		363 (113.1 overs); Owais Shah 118 (246); Robert Croft 3/80 (19.1 overs)
296/7d (77.2 overs); Alviro Petersen 77 (162); David Masters 4/62 (21 overs)		143/6 (53 overs); Billy Godleman 33 (40); Dean Cosker 5/48 (20 overs)

Match drawn
SWALEC Stadium, Cardiff
Umpires: Neil Mallender and George Sharp

- Essex won the toss and elected to field
- Points: Glamorgan 10, Essex 8

2–5 August
Scorecard

(H) Leicestershire	v	Kent
257 (77.4 overs); Claude Henderson 54 (84); Wahab Riaz 4/94 (19 overs)		219 (59.4 overs); Darren Stevens 67 (85); Jigar Naik 5/34 (10.2 overs)
289/9d (90.1 overs); Tom New 76 (101); Azhar Mahmood 4/42 (17.1 overs)		255/6 (67 overs); Rob Key 98 (153); Wayne White 2/26 (6 overs)

Match drawn
Grace Road, Leicester
Umpires: Peter Hartley and Trevor Jesty

- Leicestershire won the toss and elected to bat
- Points: Leicestershire 8, Kent 7

10–13 August
Scorecard

(H) Derbyshire	v	Gloucestershire
413 (99.5 overs); Wes Durston 151 (183); Will Gidman 6/92 (20.5 overs)		220 (61.5 overs); Richard Coughtrie 54* (96); Jonathan Clare 3/19 (12 overs)
111/3 (24.1 overs); Martin Guptill 66* (76); Jon Lewis 2/33 (10 overs)		302 (76 overs) (f/o); Kane Williamson 75 (99); Mark Turner 4/79 (18 overs)

Derbyshire won by 7 wickets
County Ground, Derby
Umpires: Martin Bodenham and Peter Willey

- Gloucestershire won the toss and elected to field
- Points: Derbyshire 24, Gloucestershire 4

10–13 August
Scorecard

(H) Kent	v	Surrey
266 (81.1 overs); Joe Denly 49 (73); Yasir Arafat 3/62 (22 overs)		127 (43.1 overs); Rory Hamilton-Brown 34 (44); Darren Stevens 7/21 (15.1 overs)
230 (72.5 overs); Rob Key 110* (202); Tim Linley 4/48 (18 overs)		104 (28.2 overs); Rory Hamilton-Brown 40 (61); James Tredwell 5/35 (9.2 overs)

Kent won by 265 runs
St Lawrence Ground, Canterbury
Umpires: Stephen Gale and John Steele

- Kent won the toss and elected to bat
- Points: Kent 21, Surrey 3

11–14 August
Scorecard

(H) Middlesex	v	Northamptonshire
317 (94.2 overs); Scott Newman 75 (115); Chaminda Vaas 5/76 (26.2 overs)		399 (124.4 overs); Mal Loye 87 (164); Steven Crook 5/94 (19 overs)
313/8d (97 overs); Chris Rogers 145 (238); Chaminda Vaas 3/51 (22 overs)

Match drawn
Lord's, London
Umpires: Michael Gough and David Millns

- Northamptonshire won the toss and elected to field
- Points: Northamptonshire 10, Middlesex 8

17–20 August
Scorecard

(H) Derbyshire	v	Northamptonshire
267 (65.3 overs); Alex Wakely 88 (135); Mark Footitt 5/53 (12.3 overs)		190 (48.2 overs); Martin Guptill 55 (90); Chaminda Vaas 5/65 (16.2 overs)
416/9d (112.5 overs); James Middlebrook 101* (154); Chesney Hughes 2/17 (5 overs)		328 (75.5 overs); Dan Redfern 58 (59); David Lucas 4/75 (18 overs)

Northamptonshire won by 165 runs
Queen's Park, Chesterfield
Umpires: Jeremy Lloyds and Steve O'Shaughnessy

- Derbyshire won the toss and elected to field
- Points: Northamptonshire 21, Derbyshire 3

17–20 August
Scorecard

(H) Essex	v	Gloucestershire
363 (86.5 overs); Adam Wheater 135 (124); Jon Lewis 4/46 (15.5 overs)		264 (77.1 overs); Kane Williamson 83 (107); David Masters 6/75 (28.1 overs)
288/5d (67 overs); Jaik Mickleburgh 84 (115); Jack Taylor 2/96 (15 overs)		231/5 (60.4 overs); Chris Taylor 103* (138); David Masters 2/50 (17 overs)

Match drawn
Castle Park Cricket Ground, Colchester
Umpires: Stephen Gale and Tim Robinson

- Essex won the toss and elected to bat
- Points: Essex 10, Gloucestershire 8

17–20 August
Scorecard

(H) Glamorgan	v	Leicestershire
392 (111.1 overs); Gareth Rees 71 (111); Wayne White 3/97 (20 overs)		309/7d (102 overs); James Taylor 127* (280); James Harris 5/45 (27 overs)
216/7d (60 overs); Will Bragg 110 (174); Jigar Naik 4/79 (23 overs)		191 (61.1 overs); Josh Cobb 44 (41); Jim Allenby 3/39 (14.1 overs)

Glamorgan won by 108 runs
Penrhyn Avenue, Rhos-on-Sea
Umpires: Neil Bainton and John Steele

- Glamorgan won the toss and elected to bat
- Points: Glamorgan 22, Leicestershire 6

17–20 August
Scorecard

(H) Kent	v	Middlesex
242 (64.2 overs); Joe Denly 55 (93); Corey Collymore 4/69 (20 overs)		303 (89.3 overs); Sam Robson 95 (167); Wahab Riaz 3/33 (10.3 overs)
332 (93.1 overs); Azhar Mahmood 92* (140); Steven Finn 5/113 (30 overs)		202 (66.4 overs); Jamie Dalrymple 108* (168); Darren Stevens 4/52 (18 overs)

Kent won by 69 runs
St Lawrence Ground, Canterbury
Umpires: Jeff Evans and George Sharp

- Kent won the toss and elected to bat
- Points: Kent 20, Middlesex 6

23–26 August
Scorecard

Derbyshire	v	Essex (H)
132 (43.4 overs); Wes Durston 48 (103); David Masters 3/28 (12 overs)		207 (57.3 overs); Ryan ten Doeschate 55 (61); Tim Groenewald 4/78 (21 overs)
187/4 (45.2 overs); Martin Guptill 86 (105); Ryan ten Doeschate 1/20 (4 overs)

Match drawn
County Ground, Chelmsford
Umpires: Nigel Cowley and George Sharp

- Essex won the toss and elected to field
- Points: Essex 7, Derbyshire 6

23–26 August
Scorecard

(H) Leicestershire	v	Surrey
167 (64.5 overs); Robert Taylor 70 (130); Tim Linley 3/22 (14 overs)		343 (92.3 overs); Steven Davies 121 (218); Robert Taylor 3/53 (15.3 overs)
286 (94.2 overs); Will Jefferson 121 (205); Tim Linley 6/57 (21.2)		111/0 (16.3 overs); Rory Hamilton-Brown 75 (56); Jigar Naik 0/15 (3)

Surrey won by 10 wickets
Grace Road, Leicester
Umpires: Steve O'Shaughnessy and Tim Robinson

- Leicestershire won the toss and elected to bat
- Points: Surrey 22, Leicestershire 3

23–26 August
Scorecard

(H) Northamptonshire	v	Middlesex
276 (93.2 overs); Rob Newton 113 (199); Corey Collymore 3/55 (21.2 overs)		479/8d (124 overs); Dawid Malan 113 (170); James Middlebrook 5/123 (34 overs)
22/0 (9 overs); Rob Newton 14* (26)

Match drawn
County Ground, Northampton
Umpires: Neil Bainton and Trevor Jesty

- Middlesex won the toss and elected to field
- Points: Northamptonshire 6, Middlesex 10

30 August–2 September
Scorecard

(H) Middlesex	v	Leicestershire
496 (119 overs); Andrew Strauss 241 * (344); Josh Cobb 1/41 (10 overs)		193 (64.3 overs); Matthew Boyce 46 (122); Steven Crook 4/45 (11.3 overs)
36/0 (5.1 overs); Chris Rogers 17* (20)		338 (108.2 overs) (f/o); James Taylor 85 (164); Toby Roland-Jones 4/64 (18.2 overs)

Middlesex won by 10 wickets
Lord's, London
Umpires: Neil Mallender and David Millns

- Leicestershire won the toss and elected to field
- Points: Middlesex 24, Leicestershire 0

31 August–3 September
Scorecard

Glamorgan	v	Gloucestershire (H)
378 (114 overs); Jim Allenby 78 (144); David Payne 4/79 (24 overs)		341 (100.5 overs); Kane Williamson 87 (141); Jim Allenby 3/42 (15.5 overs)
148 (48.3 overs); Mark Wallace 40 (73); Jon Lewis 4/43 (15.3 overs)		188/5 (55 overs); David Payne (cricketer) 62 (103); Jim Allenby 3/44 (15 overs)

Gloucestershire beat Glamorgan by 5 wickets
County Ground, Bristol
Umpires: Steve Garratt and Trevor Jesty

- Gloucestershire won the toss and elected to field
- Points: Gloucestershire 21 (Gloucestershire were deducted 1 point for a slow over rate), Glamorgan 7

31 August–3 September
Scorecard

Essex	v	Kent (H)
144 (53.4 overs); James Foster 38 (75); David Balcombe 6/51 (15.4 overs)		260 (76.2 overs); Joe Denly 55 (53); David Masters 6/78 (27 overs)
185 (61.2 overs); James Foster 49 (99); David Balcombe 4/51 (16.2 overs)		72/4 (14.3 overs); Geraint Jones 28 * (14); Graham Napier 3/42 (7 overs)

Kent beat Essex by 6 wickets
St Lawrence Ground, Canterbury
Umpires: Nick Cook and Steve O'Shaughnessy

- Essex won the toss and elected to bat
- Points: Kent 13 (Kent were subsequently deducted 8 points due to a poor pitch), Essex 3

31 August–3 September
Scorecard

(H) Northamptonshire	v	Surrey
194 (67.2 overs); Rob Newton 80 (162); Stuart Meaker 5/37 (16 overs)		269 (88.5 overs); Steven Davies 81 (157); Chaminda Vaas 4/57 (20.5 overs)
152 (55.3 overs); Kyle Coetzer 54 (88); Pragyan Ojha 6/8 (16.3 overs)		410/6 dec (96.2 overs); Steven Davies 156 (226); Andrew Hall 2/34 (11.2 overs)

Surrey won by 333 runs
County Ground, Northampton
Umpires: Martin Bodenham and George Sharp

- Surrey won the toss and elected to bat
- Points: Surrey 21, Northamptonshire 3

==== September ====
7–10 September
Scorecard

(H) Derbyshire	v	Kent
535 (114.5 overs); Ross Whiteley 130* 130 (162); David Balcombe 6/128 (32 overs)		419 (108.2 overs); Joe Denly 199 (307); Tony Palladino 5/84 (24 overs)
181 (43.1 overs); Wayne Madsen 73 (122); Darren Stevens 3/17 (4.1 overs)		196; Joe Denly 68 (73); Jonathan Clare 4/36 (11 overs)

Derbyshire won by 101 runs
County Ground, Derby
Umpires: Neil Bainton and Michael Gough

- Kent won the toss and elected to field
- Points: Derbyshire 24, Kent 7

7–10 September
Scorecard

(H) Essex	v	Surrey
253 (73.4 overs); Tom Westley 57 (132); Stuart Meaker 5–66 (16.4 overs)		315 (91.4 overs); Chris Jordan 71 (172); Graham Napier 6–53 (21.4 overs)
239 (68 overs); Graham Napier 80 (64); Chris Jordan 4–57 (17 overs)		286 (63.1 overs); Zander de Bruyn 100 (125); David Masters 6–93 (21.1 overs)

Surrey won by 109 runs
County Ground, Chelmsford
Umpires: Steve Garratt & Martin Saggers

- Essex won the toss and elected to field
- Points Surrey 22, Essex 3

7–10 September
Scorecard

(H) Glamorgan	v	Middlesex
157 (45.4 overs); Will Bragg 52 (78); Gareth Berg 6/58 (14.4 overs)		302/8d (62 overs); Chris Rogers 121 (136); Will Owen 5/124 (20 overs)
178/4 (58 overs); Nick James 49 (103); Ollie Rayner 1/28 (12 overs)

Match drawn
SWALEC Stadium, Cardiff
Umpires: Paul Baldwin and Neil Mallender

- Middlesex won the toss and elected to field
- Glamorgan 5, Middlesex 9

7–10 September
Scorecard

(H) Gloucestershire	v	Leicestershire
394 (118.3 overs); Alex Gidman 81 (114); Nathan Buck 5/99 (24 overs)		135 (49 overs); Ned Eckersley 39 (80); David Payne 6/26 (11 overs)
54/0 (9 overs); Chris Dent 27* (25)		311 (99.4 overs) (f/o); James Taylor 70 (127); David Payne 3/70 (23 overs)

Gloucestershire won by 10 wickets
County Ground, Bristol
Umpires: Nigel Cowley and Stephen Gale

- Leicestershire won the toss and elected to field
- Points: Gloucestershire 23, Leicestershire 3

12–15 September
Scorecard

(H) Kent	v	Glamorgan
237 (88.1 overs); Joe Denly 69 (130); John Glover 4/49 (18 overs)		423/9d (135 overs); Stewart Walters 147 (257); Azhar Mahmood 2/39 (21 overs)
312 (102.5 overs); Geraint Jones 79 (168); Dean Cosker 4/106 (40 overs)		129/2 (20 overs); Alviro Petersen 70* (54); Adam Ball 1/28 (5 overs)

Glamorgan won by 8 wickets
St Lawrence Ground, Canterbury
Umpires: Martin Bodenham and Alex Wharf

- Kent won the toss and elected to bat
- Points: Kent 3, Glamorgan 22
- This was the first day/night match County Championship match to be played in England.

12–15 September
Scorecard

(H) Leicestershire	v	Middlesex
319 (93.2 overs); Greg Smith 108 (199); Gareth Berg 3/32 (13.2 overs)		502 (115 overs); Gareth Berg 130* (147); Wayne White 3/54 (19 overs)
306 (97.2 overs); James Taylor 80 (154); Ollie Rayner 4/43 (17 overs)		127/5 (29 overs); Sam Robson 32 (35); Wayne White 3/36 (11 overs)

Middlesex won by 5 wickets
Grace Road, Leicester
Umpires: Nick Cook and Steve Garratt

- Middlesex won the toss and elected to field
- Leicestershire 5, Middlesex 24

12–15 September
Scorecard

(H) Northamptonshire	v	Gloucestershire
343 (108.2 overs); Andrew Hall 86 (151); Will Gidman 5/74 (25 overs)		183 (53 overs); Kane Williamson 44 (63); David Willey 5/29 (12 overs)
27/1 (3.2 overs); Niall O'Brien 14* (10); Ian Saxelby 1/12 (1.2 overs)		185 (50.2 overs) (f/o); Hamish Marshall 42 (54); David Willey 5/46 (14.2 overs)

Northamptonshire won by 9 wickets
County Ground, Northampton
Umpires: Peter Hartley and John Steele

- Northamptonshire won the toss and elected to bat
- Northamptonshire 22, Gloucestershire 3

12–15 September
Scorecard

(H) Surrey	v	Derbyshire
468 (117 overs); Tom Maynard 123 (157); Mark Footitt 3/99 (23 overs)		190 (81.2 overs); Paul Borrington 87 (225); Pragyan Ojha 4/84 (31.2 overs)
		152 (44.3 overs); Tim Groenewald 33 (43); Pragyan Ojha 6/42 (16 overs)

Surrey won by an innings and 126 runs
The Oval, London
Umpires: Neil Mallender and Steve O'Shaughnessy

- Surrey won the toss and elected to bat
- Points: Surrey 24, Derbyshire 2
