= Housego =

Housego is a surname. Notable people with the surname include:

- Dan Housego (born 1988), English cricketer
- Fred Housego (born 1944), British game show contestant
