= Matthew Boyce =

English cricketer

Personal information
- Full name: Matthew Andrew Golding Boyce
- Born: 13 August 1985 (age 41); Cheltenham, England
- Height: 5 ft 10 in (1.78 m)
- Batting: Left-handed
- Bowling: Right-arm medium
- Role: Batsman

Domestic team information
- Years: Team
- 2006–2015: Leicestershire (squad no. 11)

Career statistics
Competition	FC	LA	T20
Matches	104	67	55
Runs scored	4,882	1,499	704
Batting average	27.89	26.29	22.70
100s/50s	6/24	0/10	0/1
Top score	135	80	63*
Catches/stumpings	64/–	19/–	14/–
- Source: ESPNcricinfo, 21 April 2017

Matthew Andrew Golding Boyce (born 13 August 1985) is an English former cricketer. He played for Leicestershire. Boyce was born at Cheltenham in Gloucestershire and educated at Oakham School.

== Cricket career ==
Boyce achieved a unique feat on 23 June 2010 by winning a man of the match award, despite only appearing as a substitute. Will Jefferson had batted for the Leicestershire Foxes in their Friends Provident t20 North Group match against the Warwickshire Bears at Edgbaston, but suffered an Achilles problem resulting in Boyce taking to the field, instead. Neil Carter, Jim Troughton and Tim Ambrose were all run out by Boyce, as he helped the Foxes to win by 32 runs. After the match, Boyce was named man of the match, and he took part in the presentation ceremony with Paul Allott.

Boyce's fielding would play a similarly instrumental role for the Foxes in the final of the following year's Twenty20 competition on 27 August 2011, again at Edgbaston. Boyce had played in the Super Over victory over the Lancashire Lightning in the day's earlier semi-final, although he was not needed to bat. For the evening's final against Somerset, he was replaced in the Foxes' team by Jigar Naik. However, once again Jefferson had batted but was not able to take to the field, again due to an Achilles problem. This meant that Boyce would again appear as a substitute for Jefferson at Edgbaston. Boyce took the catches of James Hildreth, Peter Trego, Jos Buttler and Alfonso Thomas, all off the bowling of man of the match Josh Cobb, thus helping to steer the Foxes to a win by 18 runs and clinch the trophy.

He has acted as captain for Leicestershire.

On 23 July 2015 Boyce announced his retirement from cricket to take up a career in finance.

== Career best performances ==
as of 27 June 2013

	Batting			
	Score	Fixture	Venue	Season
FC	135	Leicestershire v Kent	Leicester	2013
LA	80	Leicestershire Foxes v Hampshire Royals	Leicester	2009
T20	63*	Leicestershire Foxes v Lancashire Lightning	Manchester	2012

== Charity work ==
After the 2012 English cricket season had finished, Boyce set out to walk the length of Great Britain on a route from John o' Groats to Land's End in order to raise money and promote awareness for mental health charity Mind. Although not suffering himself, he was inspired to raise awareness about depression after the suicides of sportsmen Gary Speed and Peter Roebuck. He was also frustrated by people such as Piers Morgan showing a lack of comprehension about depression and how it can impact on people from all walks of life. He started the walk in September and completed it in December. For part of the walk he was joined by fellow cricketers, including Paul Nixon.
