= Ruel Brathwaite =

Barbadian cricketer (born 1985)

Personal information
- Full name: Ruel Marlon Ricardo Brathwaite
- Born: 6 September 1985 (age 41); Bridgetown, Saint Michael, Barbados
- Batting: Right-handed
- Bowling: Right-arm fast-medium

International information
- National side: Cyprus (2026–)
- T20I debut: 8 May 2026 v Finland
- Last T20I: 17 May 2026 v Jersey

Domestic team information
- Years: Team
- 2007: Marylebone Cricket Club
- 2009: Cambridge University
- 2010–2012: Durham (squad no. 8)
- 2010: Combined Campuses and Colleges
- 2013: Hampshire (squad no. 12)

Career statistics
| Competition | T20I | FC | LA | T20 |
|---|---|---|---|---|
| Matches | 6 | 26 | 3 | 7 |
| Runs scored | 22 | 226 | – | 22 |
| Batting average | 5.50 | 12.55 | – | 4.40 |
| 100s/50s | 0/0 | –/1 | –/– | –/– |
| Top score | 10* | 76* | – | 10* |
| Balls bowled | 53 | 3,778 | 60 | 71 |
| Wickets | 1 | 71 | 1 | 2 |
| Bowling average | 97.00 | 32.52 | 72.00 | 65.00 |
| 5 wickets in innings | 0 | 3 | – | 0 |
| 10 wickets in match | – | – | – | – |
| Best bowling | 1/27 | 5/54 | 1/19 | 1/27 |
| Catches/stumpings | 4/– | 3/– | –/– | 4/– |
- Source: Cricinfo, 18 May 2026

Ruel Marlon Ricardo Brathwaite (born 6 September 1985) is a Barbadian cricketer. Brathwaite played county cricket for Durham and Hampshire, in addition to playing first-class cricket at varsity level. After settling in Cyprus years later he became involved with the national team, initially as coach and then as a player.

== Early life and education ==
Brathwaite was born in Bridgetown, Barbados in September 1985. He was educated there at Queen's College, before leaving for England aged 17 to attend Dulwich College on a cricket scholarship. At Dulwich, he was coached by former cricketer Bill Athey. Matriculating to Loughborough University, he obtained a degree in civil engineering. There, he made his debut in first-class cricket for Loughborough UCCE against Essex at Chelmsford in 2006, with Brathwaite playing a further first-class match that season against Hampshire. In the same season, he also played for a combined British Universities team against the touring Sri Lankans.

The following season, he played two first-class matches for the Marylebone Cricket Club against the touring West Indians, and later against a touring Sri Lanka A team. During the West Indies 2007 tour of England, Braithwaite was called up to the West Indians squad to play in a List A one-day match against the England Lions. Having made a further first-class appearance for Loughborough in 2007 against Worcestershire, Brathwaite made his final first-class appearance for Loughborough in 2008, against Surrey. His five matches for Loughborough yielded him 7 wickets at an expensive average of 67.85, whilst with the bat he scored 129 runs at a batting average of 32.25, and a high score of 76 not out.

From Lougborough, Brathwaite advanced to Queens' College at the University of Cambridge to study for his master's in Engineering for Sustainable Development. There, he made three first-class appearances for Cambridge MCCU in 2009, in addition to playing for Cambridge University against Oxford University in the 2009 University Match at Lord's, in which he claimed his maiden five wicket haul with 5 for 54. His participation in this match earned him his blue.

== County cricket ==
After completing his master's at Cambridge, Brathwaite was invited to trial with Durham for the latter half of the 2010 season, following a recommendation from Paul Collingwood, who had spotted him bowling to the England team in the nets at The Oval. Having made his debut in the 2010 County Championship against Somerset at Chester-le-Street, he was subsequently signed on a two-year contract. He returned to the Caribbean following the 2010 season, where he played a Twenty20 match for the Combined Campuses and Colleges against Guyana in the 2010 Caribbean Twenty20, taking one wicket, that of Christopher Barnwell for the cost of 33 runs from three overs. Returning to England for the 2011 season, he made six appearances in the County Championship and a single one-day appearance in the Clydesdale Bank 40 against Scotland. In 2012, he made three further first-class appearances for Durham, against Durham MCCU, Somerset and Australia A. Having found opportunities to establish himself at Durham limited, he left the county toward the end of the 2013 season, having taken 39 first-class wickets at an average of 23.35.

Toward the end of the 2013 season, he was signed Hampshire, with Brathwaite making three appearances in the 2013 County Championship against Northamptonshire, Leicestershire, and Essex. The following season, he made a single one-day appearance against a touring Sri Lanka A team, and was released at the end of that season alongside wicket-keeper Michael Bates.

Brathwaite settled in Cyprus with his wife and family, and whilst there became involved with the national team, first as a coach, and then as a player. As of May 2026, he has played 6 Twenty20 Internationals for the team.
