= Karl Brown (cricketer) =

English cricketer (born 1988)

Personal information
- Full name: Karl Robert Brown
- Born: 17 May 1988 (age 38); Atherton, Greater Manchester, England
- Nickname: Brownie, Charlie
- Batting: Right-handed
- Bowling: Right-arm medium
- Role: Batsman

Domestic team information
- Years: Team
- 2006–2018: Lancashire (squad no. 14)
- 2012: Moors Sports Club
- FC debut: 10 May 2006 Lancashire v Durham MCCU
- LA debut: 22 April 2007 Lancashire v Worcestershire

Career statistics
Competition	FC	LA	T20
Matches	85	80	91
Runs scored	3,572	2,420	2,188
Batting average	26.65	37.81	27.69
100s/50s	2/22	2/14	0/16
Top score	132	129	69
Balls bowled	90	6	–
Wickets	2	0	–
Bowling average	32.50	–	–
5 wickets in innings	0	–	–
10 wickets in match	0	–	–
Best bowling	2/30	–	–
Catches/stumpings	52/–	21/–	30/–
- Source: CricketArchive, 28 September 2018

Karl Robert Brown (born 17 May 1988) is an English cricketer. He is a right-handed batsman and a right-arm medium-pace bowler who played for Lancashire until 2018. Brown made his first-class debut in 2006 and his list A debut the following year. Between 2005 and 2007, Brown played 15 Youth One Day Internationals. In 2011, Brown scored his maiden centuries in first-class and list A cricket and debuted for Lancashire in twenty20s.

== Career ==
=== Early career and youth internationals ===
He was one half of his home town team's youngest opening partnership when he opened on 31 May 2003 for Atherton Cricket Club's First XI. Brown's career with Lancashire stretches back to 2003, when, as a 15-year-old, he made his Second XI debut in a defeat against Somerset Second XI. In 2005 Brown moved to Northern and helped them to their Premier League championship success that year. He moved again for the 2007 season to Milnrow, following career advice to gain experience as a nominated club professional.

Brown has played twelve Youth One-Day Internationals, making a top score of 109 in one such match. He has been awarded the Man of the Match trophy on two occasions for the England Under-19 team, once thanks to a speedy half-century, and secondly thanks to a one-man batting onslaught in a rain-affected defeat against the Indian Under-19 squad, the match in which he scored his maiden century.

On 11 May 2006, Brown made his first-class debut. The match was against Durham University and, alongside veteran Iain Sutcliffe, he opened the batting for Lancashire. He scored 2 and 32. It was the only match Brown played for Lancashire's first team that year. The next year, he made his list a (one-day) debut; playing against Worcestershire on 22 April 2007, he came in at the fall of Lancashire's first wicket and was dismissed for one run. Brown has struggled to cement a regular place in the Lancashire side, and between 2006 and 2009 he played just seven first-class matches, scoring 156 runs with a high score of 40, and five one-day appearances, managing 72 runs with a highest score of 41.

Struggling to force his way into Lancashire's batting line-up in 2009 – made up of the likes of Tom Smith, Paul Horton, Mal Loye, Mark Chilton, V V S Laxman, and Francois du Plessis – Brown was a regular in the top order of Lancashire's second team which progressed to the final of the Second XI Championship and the semi-final of the Second XI Trophy. He played just two first team matches for Lancashire in 2009, scoring 40 runs from 4 innings. In the last innings of England's 2010 Test series against Bangladesh he took a catch standing at wide mid-off claiming the wicket of Mushfiqur Rahim off Steven Finn's bowling, one of many substitute fielding appearances that day. After scoring 56 for Lancashire's first team against West Indies A in a 50-over friendly, Brown make his first 40-over appearance of the season in a Clydesdale Bank 40 group tie against the Unicorns. After Lancashire bowled the Unicorns out for 143 Brown scored a career-best of 65 not out in their run chase which resulted in Lancashire winning with 144/1. In the seven one-day matches Brown played in the 2010 season, he scored 286 runs at an average of 47.66, including his first three half-centuries in the format.

=== Breakthrough ===
Playing against Oxford Marylebone Cricket Club University in Lancashire's opening match of the 2011 season, Brown scored his maiden first-class half-century, beating his previous highest score of 40. His innings of 72 was surpassed in the next match when Brown scored 114 against Sussex to help Lancashire to victory in their first match of the 2011 County Championship. During the course of an innings of 85 against Worcestershire in August, Brown passed the landmark of 1,000 first-class runs. Brown batted alongside Steven Croft to win the final County Championship match of the season on 15 September against Somerset and in doing so winning the competition outright for the first time since 1934. The season ended with Brown scoring 795 first-class runs with an average of 31.80 (26 innings), 309 List A runs with an average of 44.14 (9 innings) and 240 Twenty20 runs with an average of 30.00 (9 innings). The performance meant he was named Lancashire's Young Player of the Year, an award for the club's under-24s. On the back of his performances for Lancashire, Brown was included in the 13-man England Development squad.

== Personal life ==
Brown is an avid supporter of Bolton Wanderers Football Club.
