= Gareth Andrew =

English cricketer

Personal information
- Full name: Gareth Mark Andrew
- Born: 27 December 1983 (age 42); Yeovil, Somerset, England
- Height: 6 ft 0 in (1.83 m)
- Batting: Left-handed
- Bowling: Right-arm medium-fast

Domestic team information
- Years: Team
- 2003–2007: Somerset
- 2008–2015: Worcestershire (squad no. 14)
- 2012/13: Canterbury
- 2016: Hampshire (squad no. 55)
- FC debut: 21 May 2003 Somerset v Hampshire
- LA debut: 2 May 2000 Somerset CB v Staffordshire

Career statistics
Competition	FC	LA	T20
Matches	96	122	112
Runs scored	2,994	1,327	871
Batting average	23.95	18.95	16.12
100s/50s	1/18	1/3	0/4
Top score	180*	104	65*
Balls bowled	13,030	3,809	1,871
Wickets	238	111	95
Bowling average	34.58	35.87	28.10
5 wickets in innings	6	1	0
10 wickets in match	0	0	0
Best bowling	5/40	5/31	4/22
Catches/stumpings	32/–	42/–	31/–
- Source: ESPNcricinfo, 28 September 2016

Gareth Mark Andrew (born 27 December 1983) is an English cricketer who most recently played for Hampshire. He is a fast medium bowler and left-handed batsman. He toured Australia with the England Under-17 team in 1997, made his debut for the Somerset 2nd XI in 1999 and played for the Somerset Cricket Board in the Nat West Bank Trophy in 2000 and the C&G Trophy in 2001. He made his first-class debut for Somerset in 2003 and also played that season for England Under-19 against South Africa Under-19.

After being restricted to the Somerset Second XI for the 2007 season, Andrew agreed to move to Worcestershire for 2008. There his performances with the bat improved, added to some impressive knocks in the shorter format game. In his first season, he was the leading wicket taker in NatWest Pro40 Division 1 with 12 wickets.

On 4 January 2011, it was confirmed that Andrew faced 6 months out following a knee operation, Andrew was expected to go in for minor surgery but the injury proved far worse than first feared.
