= James Anyon =

English cricketer

Personal information
- Full name: James Edward Anyon
- Born: 5 May 1983 (age 43); Lancaster, Lancashire, England
- Batting: Left-handed
- Bowling: Right-arm fast-medium
- Role: Bowler

Domestic team information
- Years: Team
- 2003–2004: Loughborough UCCE
- 2003: Cumberland
- 2005–2009: Warwickshire
- 2009: → Surrey (on loan)
- 2010–2016: Sussex
- FC debut: 12 April 2003 Loughborough UCCE v Somerset
- Last FC: 8 June 2014 Sussex v Somerset
- LA debut: 31 August 2003 Cumberland v Scotland
- Last LA: 19 June 2013 Sussex v Kent

Career statistics
Competition	FC	LA	T20
Matches	110	43	26
Runs scored	1,450	43	18
Batting average	14.50	5.37	6.00
100s/50s	0/5	0/0	0/0
Top score	64*	12	8*
Balls bowled	17,494	1,557	423
Wickets	311	47	30
Bowling average	35.22	30.55	19.56
5 wickets in innings	7	0	0
10 wickets in match	0	0	0
Best bowling	6/82	3/6	3/6
Catches/stumpings	32/–	9/–	3/–
- Source: CricketArchive, 25 March 2016

James Edward Anyon (born 5 May 1983) is a former cricketer who played for Sussex.

Anyon was born in Lancaster, Lancashire, and was educated in Lancashire before going to Loughborough University, where Warwickshire spotted him playing for the university. He made his debut for the Bears against Somerset in April 2005 and played fairly often throughout the season, a season which included a hat-trick which helped the Bears to beat Somerset in a Twenty20 game.

He spent time on loan at Surrey in the 2009 season after losing his place in the Warwickshire side and signed a two-year deal with Sussex in November 2009.

In April 2016 he announced his retirement from first-class cricket due to a long-standing injury.
