= Maurice Chambers =

English cricketer (born 1987)

Personal information
- Full name: Maurice Anthony Chambers
- Born: 14 September 1987 (age 39); Port Antonio, Jamaica
- Batting: Right-handed
- Bowling: Right-arm fast

Domestic team information
- Years: Team
- 2005–2013: Essex
- 2013: → Warwickshire (on loan)
- 2014–2015: Northamptonshire
- FC debut: 1 June 2005 Essex v Derbyshire
- LA debut: 16 July 2008 Essex v Yorkshire

Career statistics
Competition	FC	LA	T20
Matches	64	12	19
Runs scored	410	6	28
Batting average	6.61	2.00	9.33
100s/50s	0/1	0/0	0/0
Top score	58	2	10*
Balls bowled	8,933	415	324
Wickets	155	14	17
Bowling average	34.72	33.21	28.64
5 wickets in innings	3	0	0
10 wickets in match	1	0	0
Best bowling	6/68	3/29	3/31
Catches/stumpings	19/–	2/–	6/–
- Source: CricketArchive, 16 January 2016

Maurice Anthony Chambers (born 14 September 1987) is a cricketer who represented Essex and Northamptonshire between 2005 and 2015. He played as a right-handed batsman and a right-arm fast bowler. Despite being born at Port Antonio in Jamaica, Chambers qualified as a domestic player in county cricket by residence.

Chambers made his debut first-class appearance for Essex in June 2005 and played 44 first-class matches for the county. During this period he was selected to tour the West Indies with England Lions, and played two matches before he returned home injured.

In 2013 he spent a brief spell on loan to Warwickshire, before signing for Northants. He played 14 first-class matches for Northants, but his contract was not renewed at the end of the 2015 season.

During the 2016 season, Chambers played in the Yorkshire South Premier League for Aston Hall.

In 2021, in the wake of revelations made by Azeem Rafiq and others about their treatment in County Cricket, Chambers revealed he had been subject to repeated racist abuse during his time at Essex.
