= Paul Franks =

English cricketer (born 1979)

Personal information
- Full name: Paul John Franks
- Born: 3 February 1979 (age 47); Mansfield, Nottinghamshire, England
- Height: 6 ft 1 in (1.85 m)
- Batting: Left-handed
- Bowling: Right-arm fast-medium
- Role: All-rounder

International information
- National side: England
- Only ODI (cap 159): 20 July 2000 v West Indies

Domestic team information
- Years: Team
- 1996–2013: Nottinghamshire
- 2002/03: Canterbury
- 2010/11: Mid West Rhinos

Career statistics
Competition	ODI	FC	LA	T20
Matches	1	215	184	50
Runs scored	4	7,185	2,039	287
Batting average	4.00	27.95	21.69	16.88
100s/50s	0/0	4/41	0/7	0/0
Top score	4	123*	84*	29*
Balls bowled	54	31,587	6,757	479
Wickets	0	496	198	20
Bowling average	–	32.58	28.79	34.35
5 wickets in innings	–	11	3	0
10 wickets in match	–	0	0	0
Best bowling	–	7/56	6/27	2/12
Catches/stumpings	1/–	69/–	28/–	8/–
- Source: Cricinfo, 9 August 2016

Paul John Franks (born 3 February 1979) is a former English professional cricketer. He played a single One Day International (ODI) as a right-arm pace bowler for England, and had a long career in county cricket for Nottinghamshire.

== Playing career ==
The Nottinghamshire-born all-rounder first broke into the side as a 17-year-old in 1996. He remained a key member of the Nottinghamshire side for over a decade, despite injuries and loss of confidence. He was part of both 2005 and 2010's Nottinghamshire County Championship winning sides. He was played extensively for the club's Second XI, helping them win the county trophy in 2015, and captained them after his retirement from first-class cricket, which he announced in late 2015. Franks only won one cap for England, in 2000 at Trent Bridge versus the West Indies cricket team, but he missed the 2001 and 2002 campaigns with a recurring knee injury. Franks has previously been the captain of the under-19s, and was the vice-captain of the team with whom he won the Under-19s World Cup in 1998.

== Coaching career ==
In January 2015, prior to the 2015 World Cup, Franks was made an assistant coach of the UAE national team, with a concentration on fielding. In July 2016, following the resignation of Aaqib Javed, he was appointed acting head coach, a position which he held until being succeeded by Owais Shah in November 2016. He was the second Englishman to coach the UAE, after Colin Wells (who was head coach from 2009 to 2010).

It was announced in February 2025 that Franks would take on head coaching duties for Nottinghamshire's One-Day Cup team.
