= Stuart Meaker =

South African-born English cricketer

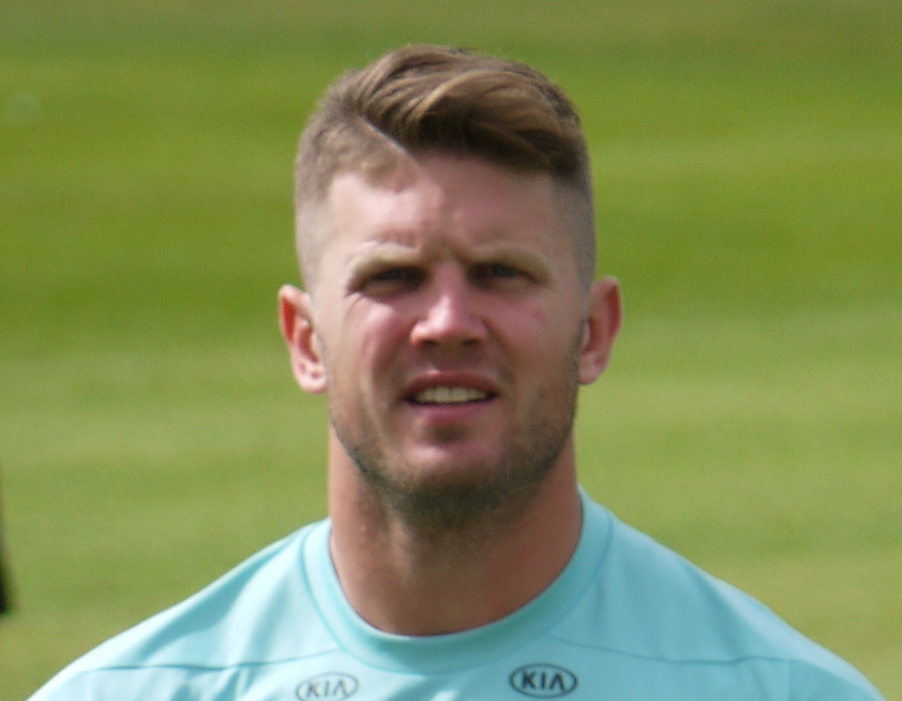

Personal information
- Full name: Stuart Christopher Meaker
- Born: 21 January 1989 (age 37); Durban, Natal Province, South Africa
- Height: 6 ft 1 in (1.85 m)
- Batting: Right-handed
- Bowling: Right-arm fast-medium

International information
- National side: England
- ODI debut (cap 224): 23 October 2011 v India
- Last ODI: 25 October 2011 v India
- ODI shirt no.: 60
- T20I debut (cap 61): 20 December 2012 v India
- Last T20I: 22 December 2012 v India
- T20I shirt no.: 60

Domestic team information
- Years: Team
- 2008–2019: Surrey (squad no. 18)
- 2017/18: Auckland
- 2020–2021: Sussex (squad no. 12)

Career statistics
Competition	ODI	T20I	FC	LA
Matches	2	2	98	73
Runs scored	2	–	1,664	198
Batting average	1.00	–	15.69	9.90
100s/50s	0/0	–	0/6	0/1
Top score	1	–	94	50
Balls bowled	114	47	14,857	2,762
Wickets	2	2	290	80
Bowling average	55.00	35.00	32.58	35.52
5 wickets in innings	0	0	11	0
10 wickets in match	0	0	2	0
Best bowling	1/45	1/28	8/52	4/37
Catches/stumpings	0/–	1/–	22/–	21/–
- Source: CricInfo, 23 September 2021

Stuart Christopher Meaker (born 21 January 1989) is a former cricketer who played for Surrey and Sussex. His family came to England from South Africa in 2001, and he was educated at Cranleigh School. For cricketing purposes he is regarded as English. He is categorised by CricketArchive and Cricinfo as a right-arm fast medium bowler and a right-handed batsman. However, according to a 2011 article in The Observer in 2009 he was timed by the speed guns at the ECB's indoor school in Loughborough at 94 miles per hour (151 km/h), the highest figure for any bowler measured there. Surrey's coach Ian Salisbury said of him: "He's always been able to bowl quick and he is a 90mph bowler, but he can also swing the ball, conventionally or reverse later on."

He played in two "Test" matches for the English U-19 cricket team in 2007. He also played in six Under-19 limited overs internationals, of which the last two were in the Under-19 World Cup in Malaysia in 2007–08.

He made his first-class debut for Surrey against Loughborough UCCE in a match that began on 12 April 2008. He did not bat, but took one wicket for 53 runs. He made his List A debut for Surrey against Sussex on 28 May 2008, but did not bat or bowl.

The end of 2008 saw him off to Australia where he played for a club side in Sydney, before returning to play with Surrey. His 2009 season at Surrey saw him significantly improve both his batting and bowling figures.

In September 2011, he was called into England's squad for a one-day series in India later in the year. He had taken only 19 List A wickets at the time of his selection. He made his England One Day International debut on the tour, taking a wicket in the process.

In early November 2012 he was added to the England squad touring India, as cover for the injured Steven Finn. In December he was selected for his first Twenty20 International.

In January 2020, Surrey confirmed that they had released Meaker from his contract, and that he was to join Sussex on a two-year deal.
