= Chris Metters =

English cricketer (born 1990)

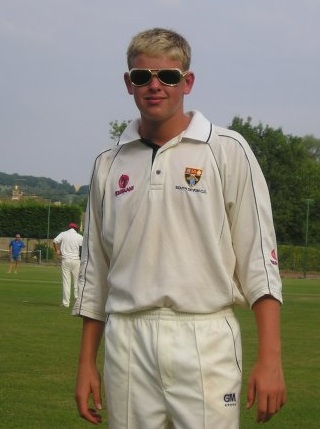

Personal information
- Full name: Christopher Liam Metters
- Born: 12 September 1990 (age 36); Torquay, England
- Height: 6 ft 2 in (1.88 m)
- Batting: Right-handed
- Bowling: Slow left-arm orthodox
- Role: Bowler

Domestic team information
- Years: Team
- 2008–2010: Devon
- 2011–2013: Warwickshire (squad no. 35)

Career statistics
Competition	FC	LA
Matches	10	3
Runs scored	167	3
Batting average	23.85	1.50
100s/50s	0/0	0/0
Top score	30	2
Balls bowled	1330	108
Wickets	29	2
Bowling average	23.96	47.00
5 wickets in innings	2	0
10 wickets in match	0	n/a
Best bowling	6/65	2/41
Catches/stumpings	15/–	1/–
- Source: CricInfo, 26 July 2017

Christopher Liam Metters (born 12 September 1990) is a former professional cricketer who made his first-class debut for Warwickshire County Cricket Club in 2011. He played Minor Counties cricket for Devon from 2008 to 2010. He was born at Torquay, Devon.

Metters missed the entire 2012 first-class season due to a shoulder injury. He underwent surgery in July.

After failing to recover from a persistent shoulder injury, Metters was released by Warwickshire towards the end of the 2013 season.
