= Karl Turner (cricketer) =

English cricketer (born 1987)

Personal information
- Full name: Karl Turner
- Born: 29 November 1987 (age 38); Dryburn, Durham, England
- Batting: Left-handed
- Bowling: Right-arm medium-fast

Domestic team information
- Years: Team
- 2011: Nottinghamshire

Career statistics
Competition	First-class	List A
Matches	5	2
Runs scored	227	22
Batting average	25.22	11.00
100s/50s	0/1	0/0
Top score	64	18
Catches/stumpings	1/–	0/–
- Source: Cricinfo, 8 December 2011

Karl Turner (born 29 November 1987) is an English cricketer who played for Nottinghamshire. Turner is a left-handed batsman and a right-arm medium-fast bowler. He joined the academy at Durham in 2004 and played for their Second XI before moving to Nottinghamshire, where a score of 185 in a 2011 Second XI Championship match against MCC Universities helped to earn him a place in the First XI.
