= Callum Thorp =

Australian cricketer (born 1975)

Personal information
- Full name: Callum David Thorp
- Born: 11 February 1975 (age 51); Mount Lawley, Perth, Western Australia, Australia
- Height: 191 cm (6 ft 3 in)
- Batting: Right-handed
- Bowling: Right-arm medium
- Role: Bowler

Domestic team information
- Years: Team
- 2002/03–2003/04: Western Australia
- 2005–2013: Durham (squad no. 36)
- FC debut: 23 January 2013 Western Australia v New South Wales
- Last FC: 2 August 2013 Durham v Middlesex
- LA debut: 2 January 2013 Western Australia v Queensland
- Last LA: 22 June 2013 Durham v Hampshire

Career statistics
Competition	FC	LA	T20
Matches	94	44	9
Runs scored	1,664	323	63
Batting average	14.99	17.00	10.50
100s/50s	0/3	0/1	0/0
Top score	79*	52	13
Balls bowled	14,345	1,963	162
Wickets	267	54	3
Bowling average	25.37	27.57	88.66
5 wickets in innings	9	1	0
10 wickets in match	1	0	0
Best bowling	7/88	6/17	2/32
Catches/stumpings	53/0	8/0	1/0
- Source: CricketArchive, 25 August 2015

Callum David Thorp (born 11 February 1975) is a former professional Australian cricketer who played for Durham County Cricket Club as a right-arm medium bowler. As both of his parents are British, he was able to play for Durham as a non-overseas player. He began his career playing for Western Australia.
