= David Lucas (cricketer) =

English cricketer (born 1978)

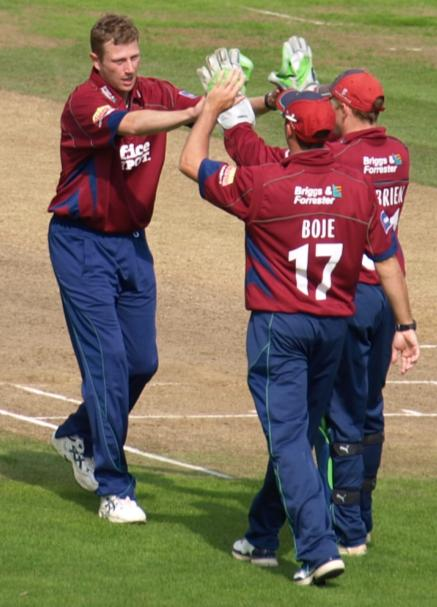
- Lucas (centre) in 2009

Personal information
- Full name: David Scott Lucas
- Born: 19 August 1978 (age 48); Nottingham, England
- Height: 6 ft 3 in (1.91 m)
- Batting: Right-handed
- Bowling: Left-arm medium-fast
- Role: Bowler

Domestic team information
- Years: Team
- 1999–2004: Nottinghamshire
- 2005–2006: Yorkshire
- 2007–2011: Northamptonshire
- 2011–2014: Worcestershire (squad no. 6)

Career statistics
| Competition | FC | LA | T20 |
|---|---|---|---|
| Matches | 94 | 85 | 30 |
| Runs scored | 1,687 | 237 | 16 |
| Batting average | 17.75 | 10.77 | 5.33 |
| 100s/50s | 0/1 | 0/0 | 0/0 |
| Top score | 55* | 32* | 5* |
| Balls bowled | 14,502 | 3,132 | 476 |
| Wickets | 263 | 96 | 21 |
| Bowling average | 32.33 | 31.54 | 29.14 |
| 5 wickets in innings | 9 | 1 | 0 |
| 10 wickets in match | 1 | 0 | 0 |
| Best bowling | 7/24 | 5/48 | 3/19 |
| Catches/stumpings | 18/– | 22/– | 5/– |
- Source: Cricinfo, 22 May 2013

David Scott Lucas (born 19 August 1978) is an English first-class cricketer, who last played for Worcestershire County Cricket Club. He previously played for Nottinghamshire, Yorkshire and Northamptonshire. He won the NBC Denis Compton Award in 2000.

== Career ==
A left-arm fast-medium bowler, he first played for Nottinghamshire Second XI in 1996 and made his debut for Nottinghamshire in first-class cricket in 1999. He played at Trent Bridge until 2003, although he was selected only for one day games in his latter two seasons. Seeking first-team cricket, Lucas moved to Yorkshire for the 2005 season, but failed to cement a place in the team. He played for Lincolnshire in the Minor Counties Championship in 2006, and then moved to Northamptonshire in 2007. After a poor start especially in one day cricket, he became a first-team starter in all forms of the game. He recorded his best innings figures of 7 for 24 and match figures of 12 for 73 against Gloucestershire in 2009. In August 2011, Lucas signed a three-year contract with Division one side Worcestershire.
