= Tim Linley =

English cricketer (born 1982)

Personal information
- Full name: Timothy Edward Linley
- Born: 23 March 1982 (age 44); Horsforth, Leeds, England
- Height: 187 cm (6 ft 2 in)
- Batting: Right-handed
- Bowling: Right-arm fast-medium
- Role: Bowler

Domestic team information
- Years: Team
- 2003–2005: Oxford UCCE
- 2004: British Universities
- 2006: Sussex
- 2009–2015: Surrey (squad no. 12)

Career statistics
Competition	FC	LA	T20
Matches	62	25	7
Runs scored	536	84	9
Batting average	8.00	21.00	4.50
100s/50s	0/0	0/0	0/0
Top score	42	20*	8
Balls bowled	10,621	898	122
Wickets	191	23	6
Bowling average	27.72	39.56	24.66
5 wickets in innings	5	0	0
10 wickets in match	1	0	0
Best bowling	6/57	3/50	2/28
Catches/stumpings	21/–	3/–	2/–
- Source: CricketArchive, 22 December 2014

Timothy Edward Linley (born 23 March 1982) is a former English cricketer who played primarily for Surrey. He was a right-handed batsman and a right-arm medium-fast bowler. He was born in Horsforth, Leeds, where he played cricket for Horsforth Cricket Club.

Linley went to St. Mary's Catholic High School, Menston. He started his first-class career with Oxford University, for whom he played for two years. The Oxford team at the time included Joe Sayers (with whom Linley went to school and who was at Yorkshire), Michael Munday (Somerset) and Viv Richards' son Mali. He also represented Combined Universities. During this time, his scalps included Scott Newman (his maiden first-class wicket), Adam Hollioake, James Benning, Darren Bicknell, Jason Gallian, Russell Warren, Mark Richardson (New Zealand touring side), Michael di Venuto, Jonathan Moss and Jehan Mubarak (Sri Lankan touring side).

Linley moved to Sussex in 2005, ostensibly as a 'prize' after winning the London County Cricket Club 'search for a star' competition, although rumour has it the contract had already been agreed previously. It did not prove to be a happy pairing. There were few opportunities for Linley in Sussex's championship winning side and his appearances were restricted to the second XI, the tourists game (Sri Lanka) and the Twenty20 challenge.

Linley then made the occasional appearance for Middlesex Second XI and had an extended run with Surrey second XI in 2008 including a five-wicket haul (seven in the match) against Kent.

He played for Surrey in the final two Twenty20 group matches of the 2009 season but was wicketless in both.

By 2011, Linley had established himself as a regular in the Surrey First XI, having survived Chris Adam's clear-out of many Surrey players by taking 20 wickets in the 2010 season (backed up by a further 23 for Surrey Second XI). On 8 February 2011 he signed a new two-year deal with the club, and later recorded his career-best figures of 6/57 against Leicestershire on 25 August 2011 (with figures of 9/79 in the match).

In September 2015 he announced that he was retiring because of injury.

Linley now owns and runs an independent coffee shop in Hyde Park, Leeds called Coffee on the Crescent
