= Richard Coughtrie =

English-born Scottish cricketer

Personal information
- Full name: Richard George Coughtrie
- Born: 1 September 1988 (age 38); North Shields, Tyne & Wear, England
- Height: 5 ft 9 in (1.75 m)
- Batting: Right-handed
- Role: Wicket-keeper

Domestic team information
- Years: Team
- 2009–2011: Oxford MCCU
- 2010–2013: Gloucestershire (squad no. 12)
- FC debut: 11 April 2009 Oxford UCCE v Worcestershire
- LA debut: 2 June 2011 Gloucestershire v Surrey

Career statistics
Competition	FC	LA
Matches	30	14
Runs scored	909	65
Batting average	19.76	7.22
100s/50s	0/2	0/0
Top score	54*	18
Catches/stumpings	59/1	6/6
- Source: CricketArchive, 1 October 2013

Richard Coughtrie (born 1 September 1988) is an English born Scottish cricketer, a wicket-keeper-batsman who most recently played for Gloucestershire. He made his first-class debut for Oxford UCCE against Worcestershire in April 2009. Coughtrie signed a two-year contract with Gloucestershire in November 2010. Coughtrie worked as a teacher of economics at Dulwich College, London and now works at Eton College.

== County career ==
Born 1 September 1988, North Shields, Northumberland, Coughtrie made his first-class debut for Oxford UCCE in April 2009 opening the batting scoring 4 and taking two catches in a drawn match. He made his debut for Gloucestershire after making a host of second XI appearances against Derbyshire in April 2011. He scored 20 in the first innings, however didn't keep wicket due to first option Jonathan Batty playing. Gloucestershire beat Derbyshire by seven wickets. Coughtrie scored 47 not out in 69 balls in a three-day University match against Cardiff UCCE in April 2011. Coughtrie made 45 in the first innings in a drawn match against Essex in May 2011. In August 2011, Coughtrie made his first-class top score as he made 54 not out to top score in the Gloucestershire first innings against Derbyshire in a seven wicket loss.

On 7 October 2013, it was announced that Gloucestershire were releasing Coughtrie after he played just one Twenty20 match in 2012.

== International career ==
In September 2012 Coughtrie was called up to the Scotland squad for their tour to South Africa. Coughtrie is eligible due to his Scottish father.

== Career best performances ==
as of 1 October 2013

	Batting/Bowling			
	Score	Fixture	Venue	Season
FC	54*	Gloucestershire v Derbyshire	Derby	2011
T20	18	Gloucestershire Gladiators v Essex Eagles	Chelmsford	2011
40 overs	5/36	MCC v NEPL Representative XI	Eppleton	2022
