= Lee Daggett =

English cricketer

Personal information
- Full name: Lee Martin Daggett
- Born: 1 October 1982 (age 44); Bury, England
- Height: 6 ft 0 in (1.83 m)
- Batting: Right-handed
- Bowling: Right-arm medium-fast
- Role: Bowler

Domestic team information
- Years: Team
- 2006–2008: Warwickshire
- 2008: → Leicestershire (on loan)
- 2009–2013: Northamptonshire (squad no. 10)

Career statistics
Competition	FC	LA	T20
Matches	71	63	56
Runs scored	613	92	11
Batting average	12.77	15.33	2.20
100s/50s	0/1	0/0	0/0
Top score	50*	14*	3*
Balls bowled	10,974	2,522	805
Wickets	166	79	28
Bowling average	37.95	25.96	35.89
5 wickets in innings	2	0	0
10 wickets in match	0	0	0
Best bowling	8/94	4/17	2/17
Catches/stumpings	13/–	10/–	13/–
- Source: Cricinfo, 24 January 2016

Lee Daggett (born 1 October 1982) is an English former cricketer who played for Warwickshire, Leicestershire and Northants as a right-arm medium-pace bowler and a right-handed batsman.

== Career ==
Daggett started his cricketing career with Durham MCC University in 2003, playing occasional games against first-class cricketing teams before representing a combined team of British Universities against a touring New Zealand line-up the following year. He graduated from Durham University (John Snow College) in 2005. Having impressed Warwickshire with his performances during 2005, the team signed him for the 2006 season, in which he played occasionally as the number 11 batsman in the line-up. He played frequently in the Second XI, and retained his place in the first team for the 2007 season. He was loaned to Leicestershire for the final month of the 2008 season, and was released by Warwickshire at the end of that season.

He joined Northants for the 2009 season, and played for them in all three formats of the game. In 2013, he was a part of the Northants team which won the Friends Life T20, taking the wicket of Zander de Bruyn in the final. During his cricketing career he studied physiotherapy at Salford University and he retired from cricket at the end of the 2013 season, in order to take up a job as physiotherapist at Northampton Saints Rugby Union team.

Daggett's father Peter was a Lancashire League player for Ramsbottom, while Daggett himself has played over 100 games in the Lancashire League, since making his debut in the competition at the age of fifteen, playing in the Worsley Cup final of 2005.

== Career best performances ==
Updated 24 January 2016

	Batting				Bowling			
	Score	Fixture	Venue	Season	Figures	Fixture	Venue	Season
FC	50*	Northamptonshire v Leicestershire	Leicester	2011	8/94	Durham UCCE v Durham	Chester-le-Street	2004
LA	14*	Northamptonshire Steelbacks v Derbyshire Phantoms	Northampton	2009	4/17	Northamptonshire Steelbacks v Netherlands	Northampton	2010
T20	3*	Northamptonshire Steelbacks v Gloucestershire Gladiators	Bristol	2009	2/17	Northamptonshire Steelbacks v Lancashire Lightning	Northampton	2011
