= Jigar Naik =

English cricketer (born 1984)

Personal information
- Full name: Jigar Kumar Hakumatrai Naik
- Born: 10 August 1984 (age 42); Leicester, England
- Batting: Right-handed
- Bowling: Right-arm off break

Domestic team information
- Years: Team
- 2002: Leicestershire Cricket Board
- 2006–2016: Leicestershire (squad no. 22)
- 2007: Loughborough UCCE
- 2011: Colombo
- FC debut: 26 July 2006 Leics v West Indies A
- LA debut: 29 August 2002 Leics CB v Denmark

Career statistics
Competition	FC	LA	T20
Matches	77	38	54
Runs scored	1,888	193	74
Batting average	21.21	11.35	14.80
100s/50s	1/5	0/0	0/0
Top score	109*	36*	16*
Balls bowled	12,003	1,460	945
Wickets	170	30	42
Bowling average	39.15	43.80	26.97
5 wickets in innings	6	0	0
10 wickets in match	0	0	0
Best bowling	8/179	3/21	3/3
Catches/stumpings	42/–	5/–	14/–
- Source: CricketArchive, 5 April 2017

Jigar Kumar Hakumatrai Naik (born 10 August 1984) is an English cricket player. Jigar was born in Leicester and educated at Rushey Mead School and Gateway College in the city. He is, as of June 2015, playing for Leicestershire.

Naik who played for Kibworth and Billesdon as well as Loughborough MCCU, made history when he became the first Leicester-born Asian to play for Leicestershire in a first-class game against a touring West Indies A side. Naik took one wicket, that of test batsmen Dwayne Smith.

In Naik's first county game against Glamorgan in the Pro40, he took 3/24.

Naik has been a consistsent performer since 2009. In 2009 he was named Leicestershire's most improved uncapped player. In 2010, Naik topped the national bowling averages with 35 wickets at an average of 17.59, including 7–96 against Surrey at The Oval. A lot of credit for this has to go to his spin partner at Leics, Claude Henderson. Both received new 2-year contracts at the end of the 2011 season.

Naik missed a large part of the 2012 season when he damaged ankle ligaments in early May, not making a comeback until August.

Naik did make an excellent start to the 2013 season when he took 5–98 against Worcestershire in early May. His season came to a premature end when he dislocated a shoulder against Nottinghamshire on 12 July.
