= Dan Housego =

English cricketer (born 1988)

Personal information
- Full name: Daniel Mark Housego
- Born: 12 October 1988 (age 38); Windsor, Berkshire, England
- Height: 5 ft 11 in (1.80 m)
- Batting: Right-handed
- Bowling: Right-arm leg break
- Role: Batsman

Domestic team information
- Years: Team
- 2008–2011: Middlesex
- 2012–2014: Gloucestershire (squad no. 3)
- 2014: Partex Sporting Club
- FC debut: 12 August 2008 Middlesex v Derbyshire
- Last FC: 9 June 2014 Gloucestershire v Surrey
- LA debut: 17 July 2012 Gloucestershire v Worcestershire
- Last LA: 22 December 2014 Partex v KKC

Career statistics
| Competition | FC | LA | T20 |
|---|---|---|---|
| Matches | 39 | 14 | 12 |
| Runs scored | 1,948 | 478 | 175 |
| Batting average | 31.93 | 36.76 | 25.00 |
| 100s/50s | 4/7 | 1/3 | 0/1 |
| Top score | 217* | 132 | 59* |
| Balls bowled | 166 | 81 | – |
| Wickets | 2 | 1 | – |
| Bowling average | 54.5 | 66 | – |
| 5 wickets in innings | 0 | 0 | – |
| 10 wickets in match | 0 | 0 | – |
| Best bowling | 1/5 | 1/16 | – |
| Catches/stumpings | 21/– | 4/– | 5/– |
- Source: CricketArchive, 9 April 2017

Daniel Mark Housego (born 12 October 1988) is an English cricketer who last played county cricket for Gloucestershire and is a right-handed top order batsman.

Dan Housego was educated at Moulsford Prep School, Oxford and The Oratory School, Woodcote. He attended the Middlesex Cricket Academy. He made his first-class debut versus Derbyshire in August 2008, aged nineteen.

He played youth team football for Oxford United and won the Under-12 national 200m championship. He has also played for Berkshire in the Minor Counties Championship on numerous occasions.

He represented Middlesex in 15 first-class matches (2008–2011) and 5 Twenty20 matches (2008–2009). He left the staff after the end of the 2011 season.

On 25 January 2012, Housego joined Gloucestershire on a three-year deal, taking him to the end of the 2014 season. Housego had previously been at Gloucestershire as part of their youth academy.
