= Paul Horton =

English cricketer (born 1982)

Personal information
- Full name: Paul James Horton
- Born: 20 September 1982 (age 44); Sydney, New South Wales, Australia
- Nickname: Horts
- Height: 5 ft 10 in (1.78 m)
- Batting: Right-handed
- Bowling: Right-arm medium
- Role: Batsman

Domestic team information
- Years: Team
- 2003–2015: Lancashire (squad no. 20)
- 2010–2011: Matabeleland Tuskers
- 2016–2020: Leicestershire (squad no. 2)

Career statistics
Competition	FC	LA	T20
Matches	218	121	82
Runs scored	12,309	2,953	1,477
Batting average	35.47	29.82	23.82
100s/50s	24/67	3/14	0/5
Top score	209	111*	71*
Balls bowled	118	13	–
Wickets	2	1	–
Bowling average	40.00	8.00	–
5 wickets in innings	0	0	–
10 wickets in match	0	0	–
Best bowling	2/6	1/7	–
Catches/stumpings	201/1	50/–	32/–
- Source: ESPNcricinfo, 30 September 2019

Paul James Horton (born 20 September 1982 in Sydney, Australia) is a retired former cricketer who played for Lancashire and Leicestershire in England and Matabeleland Tuskers in Zimbabwe.

== Early life ==
Born 20 September 1982 in Sydney, Australia, Horton was raised in the city before moving to Liverpool, England, (the native home of his parents) as a teenager. His first season of cricket in England was played at Winstanley Park, a team based in Billinge, Wigan, with which he impressed and was noticed by Lancashire. The following season he played his club cricket at Sefton Park CC in Liverpool, as this league was of a higher standard. He then joined the Lancashire youth set up and captained the U17 and U19 teams.

== Cricket career ==
=== Lancashire ===
Horton joined the Lancashire first team squad in 2003. He came close to scoring his maiden first-class century in July 2005 when he scored 99 batting at number four against Essex in a drawn match; he was dismissed by Grant Flower two overs before the end of the day. After failing to cement a place in the Lancashire team Horton spent the winter of 2006/07 playing grade cricket in Australia to improve his batting. He spent the season playing for Ginninderra Cricket Club in Canberra. He also represented the Canberra Comets in the second tier Cricket Australia Cup which is a state second XI competition one level below first-class status. After several seasons of impressing in second XI cricket, Horton finally broke through and established himself in the first team.

In May 2007 Horton hit his maiden century for Lancashire with 139 in a County Championship match against Worcestershire; his effort came on the final day of a drawn match and he spent 12 overs marooned in the 90s. A few weeks later in August, Horton bettered that with a 149 against their great rivals Yorkshire; this came in a partnership of 258 with Stuart Law for Lancashire's highest partnership for any wicket in first-class cricket against Yorkshire, beating the previous record of 247 set by Graham Lloyd and Ian Austin in 1997. Also in August the same year, Horton set another career best of 152 against Hampshire in a drawn match. A successful 2007 season for Horton was recognised by the club when he received his Lancashire Cap and was named Lancashire Player of the Year at the end of the season. He finished the season with 1,034 championship runs at an average of 49.23. As a result of his on field exploits, Horton was named the BBC North West Sports Awards Newcomer for 2007.

In May 2008, Horton scored 108 against a Durham bowling attack including Steve Harmison, who had been dropped from the England team, before being run out. His century was part of a Lancashire victory by 232 runs as James Anderson and Andrew Flintoff shared 16 wickets in the match. Horton scored his sixth first-class century, and his second against Yorkshire, in May 2008. He scored 152, equalling his best score, and shared a partnership of 258 with Mohammad Yousuf who went on to score 205* as the match was drawn, equalling Lancashire's record for any partnership against Yorkshire. In July 2008, Lancashire captain Stuart Law expressed the view that Horton was playing well enough to play for England but that his batting could still improve After a series of good performances in the Lancashire's first-class team, Horton stated that he wanted to play more one day cricket. On 25 August 2008, Horton scored his maiden list A half-century. Batting at number three, he top scored for Lancashire with 56 from 75 balls against Sussex.

Over the 2008/09 winter season, Horton played club cricket in Australia; he captained Gosnells cricket team in Western Australia. In March, Horton was part of the Lancashire squad which toured the United Arab Emirates and took part in the Pro ARCH Trophy. He scored a century against Sussex, and finished as the third-highest run-scorer of the tournament. Horton began the 2009 English season by scoring a century in Lancashire's opening first-class match. Opening the batting against Durham University, he scored 105 runs from 182 balls before being stumped. On 26 April 2009, Horton scored his maiden list A century after missing the first one-day game of the season through injury; opening the batting with Tom Smith, he scored 100 off 108 balls as Lancashire won by 6 wickets. Despite registering several low scores in the opening matches of Lancashire's county championship campaign, Horton' one-day form was good and he scored his second listA century on 4 May. Becoming only the fourth Lancashire player to score centuries in successive one-day matches, Horton scored 111 not out from 144 balls as Lancashire beat Derbyshire by 8 wickets.

=== Matabeleland Tuskers (2010–11) ===
In late 2010, Horton was signed by Zimbabwean team Matabeleland Tuskers. He described his role in the squad as "... to get runs in all forms of the game and also bring an approach and a dedication to the game that rubs off on the rest of the squad. To have that added responsibility on my shoulders can only make me a better person and a better cricketer in the forthcoming season for Lancashire." In a match against the Mountaineers in November, Horton scored his first T20 half-century, beating his previous best of 44. He set another personal best two months later in a match against Southern Rocks; Horton scored his maiden first-class double-century. The innings of 209 beat his previous highest score of 173.

=== Leicestershire ===
In September 2015, it was announced that Horton had signed a three-year deal with Leicestershire.

He retired from the game in October 2020.
