= Lancashire County Cricket Club in 2005 =

2005 season of an English cricket team

Lancashire Lightning
2005 season
- Captain: Mark Chilton
- Ground(s): Old Trafford

Lancashire County Cricket Club played cricket in Division Two of the County Championship and Division One of the totesport League in the 2005 English cricket season. After their shock relegation last season, they were 11–10 favourites to win the Second Division of the Championship, and they managed this with seven wins and a total of 212 points. They also survived in Division One of the National League, beating Worcestershire Royals on the last matchday to stay up. Lancashire also qualified for the final of the Twenty20 Cup, but lost by seven wickets to Somerset Sabres.

Lancashire played 17 first class matches in the 2005 season, winning eight, drawing six and losing three, while their season included 21 List A games – with nine wins, eleven losses and one no-result. They also played 10 Twenty20 games, with seven wins, one no-result and two losses, including the final.

== Players ==
- Brad Hodge
- Muttiah Muralitharan
- Marcus North
- Murali Kartik
- Andrew Symonds
- James Anderson
- Glen Chapple
- Dominic Cork
- Steven Croft
- Andrew Crook
- Steven Crook
- Gareth Cross
- Andrew Flintoff
- Warren Hegg
- Kyle Hogg
- Paul Horton
- Gary Keedy
- Stuart Law
- Mal Loye
- Sajid Mahmood
- Simon Marshall
- Oliver Newby
- Tim Rees
- Iain Sutcliffe
- Gary Yates

== Tables ==
=== Championship ===
2005 County Championship – Division Two
Pos	Team	Pld	W	D	L	Pen	Bat	Bowl	Pts
1	Lancashire	16	7	6	3	0	43	47	212
2	Durham	16	6	8	2	0	45	44	205
3	Yorkshire	16	5	10	1	0.5	49	42	200.5
4	Northamptonshire	16	5	8	3	0	45	46	193
5	Essex	16	5	7	4	0	51	36	185
6	Worcestershire	16	5	4	7	5.5	53	46	179.5
7	Leicestershire	16	3	7	6	0.5	45	45	159.5
8	Somerset	16	4	5	7	0	42	37	155
9	Derbyshire	16	1	7	8	0	31	43	116

=== totesport League ===
2005 totesport League – Division One
Pos	Team	Pld	W	L	NR	Pts
1	Essex Eagles	16	13	1	2	56
2	Middlesex Crusaders	16	10	5	1	42
3	Northamptonshire Steelbacks	16	7	7	2	32
4	Glamorgan Dragons	16	6	6	4	32
5	Nottinghamshire Outlaws	16	6	7	3	30
6	Lancashire Lightning	16	6	9	1	26
7	Gloucestershire Gladiators	16	6	9	1	26
8	Worcestershire Royals	16	5	10	1	22
9	Hampshire Hawks	16	5	10	1	22

== Match details ==
=== April ===
It took until 30 April before Lancashire could celebrate their first win, after a Championship draw with Somerset an abandoned match with Glamorgan Dragons (their only abandoned List A match in the season), before they lost to Middlesex Crusaders in their second League match of the season despite having them

==== County Championship: Lancashire v Somerset (13–16 April) ====
Lancashire (10pts) drew with Somerset (9pts)

At Old Trafford, Somerset won the toss and elected to field on a seaming pitch after a delayed start. Mal Loye was the only Lancastrian to score a half-century, as Somerset made the most of the conditions. Iain Sutcliffe, Stuart Law and Mark Chilton all worked themselves into the 30s, but failed to progress. Lancashire finished the first day on 235 for 7.

Second day honours went to Lancashire. First their not out batsmen, Dominic Cork and Sajid Mahmood, took the eighth wicket partnership to 94, and Lancashire finished on 323. Andy Caddick took 4 for 78. James Anderson and Dominic Cork then set about damaging Somerset's batting. Only Ian Blackwell, who was dropped by Law at slip when on 17, put up much resistance, with captain and England opener Marcus Trescothick making only 11. At one stage Somerset were 53 for 4, and they finished the day on 193 for 7, with Blackwell not out on 74.

Just as Lancashire's tail had pushed on at the end of their innings, so did Somerset's on the third day. Blackwell made his second century in two innings, finally surrendering on 122. The second-highest scorer was Richard Johnson with 40. Blackwell explained, "I've changed a few things this year and started to bat on off stump. A lot of bowlers have been going across me because they know that I go at widish balls. The ball's now closer to me if it's slanted across and I'm backing my hand-eye co-ordination to avoid being lbw." The day itself was very cold, with Blackwell saying, "It was absolutely perishing out there. I think play should be abandoned if it gets that cold." After Somerset were dismissed for 272, six Somerset men came out to field sporting woollen hats. Bad light and rain meant the day ended at 2.07pm, with Lancashire on 33 for 1, 84 runs ahead. Whilst a Lancashire victory was not out of the question, the most likely result was the draw.

Lancashire batted on for another 49 overs, scoring 195 for 6 declared, and setting Somerset a target of 247 runs in 31 overs. Paul Horton and Loye put on 94 for the first wicket. But all in all, taking 61 overs to score 195 was hardly declaration batting. Somerset did not go for the win (which would have meant scoring at well over 7 an over), and made 69 for 3 off 22.3 overs before play ended because of bad light. Lancashire's Mal Loye, who fell just short of his century on 92 in the second innings to go with his 53 in the first said, "To get a couple of fifties against a pretty good attack is a good start. It was a pretty difficult pitch to bat on during the first day but it got easier as the match wore on and I was disappointed to miss out. Getting a century is a psychological thing for a batsman. I don't set myself goals or anything like that, but it's always nice to get a hundred." (Cricinfo scorecard)

==== National League: Lancashire v Glamorgan (17 April) ====
Match abandoned – Lancashire (2pts), Glamorgan (2pts)

Simon Jones took 3 for 19 for the defending champions Glamorgan Dragons took on Lancashire Lightning at Old Trafford. Afterwards he said, "The older I've got the easier I've found bowling. My control has got better over the last couple of years and that showed today." Alex Wharf and Robert Croft also both took 2 wickets as Lancashire moved to 160 for 8 off 41.2 overs, with Hogg top-scoring with 41 not out. Rain then brought proceedings to a close. (BBC scorecard)

==== National League: Middlesex v Lancashire (24 April) ====
Middlesex (4pts) beat Lancashire (0pts) by 69 runs

Lancashire Lightning won the toss at Lord's and put Middlesex Crusaders in. This looked the right decision as Lancashire's seam and swing bowling attack saw Middlesex fall to 6 for 3, and then 37 for 6. The Crusaders were then rescued by James Dalrymple, who took 81 off 82 balls to take them to 210 for 9 in their 45 overs.

Lancashire's reply started to come unstuck when both openers, Stuart Law and Iain Sutcliffe, fell in successive balls with the score on 23. The game saw the return of Andrew Flintoff, back after his operation and playing just as a batsman. But he couldn't stop the rot and made only 17 before falling lbw to Scott Styris. The Lightning were finally all out for 141 and Middlesex completed their second win in two matches. All eleven bowlers used in the match got at least one wicket, but the most prolific wicket-taker, Kyle Hogg, also conceded the most runs. (Cricinfo scorecard)

==== County Championship: Worcestershire v Lancashire (27–30 April) ====
Lancashire (17pts) beat Worcestershire (6pts) by 76 runs

Lancashire batted first after losing the toss at Worcester, and were soon in trouble. At 81 for 3, Andrew Flintoff, playing his first first-class match after returning from injury, came to the crease. However, after facing 5 balls he was back in the Pavilion without scoring. It got worse for Lancashire as they fell to 97 for 6 and 196 all out, mostly thanks to an unbeaten 69 from wicket-keeper Warren Hegg. In reply, Worcestershire lost Stephen Moore early, but Graeme Hick and Stephen Peters were there at close, with Worcestershire on 59 for 1.

Hick dominated the second day's play as he moved from 32 not out to 176 in 231 balls, his 127th first-class century and his 97th for Worcestershire. This now puts him tenth in the list of all-time century makers, just ahead of W. G. Grace. However, no other Worcester player scored more than 27 as Muttiah Muralitharan picked up 5 wickets, and they finished on 306, 110 ahead. Lancashire were 47 for 1 in reply at stumps.

There was cheer for England fans on the third day, as the England regular Flintoff was back to his belligerent best, scoring 83 from 101 balls. Stuart Law also made 83, but was slower, taking 152 balls. With support from Dominic Cork (57), Lancashire were able to set a fair target. Their 377 left Worcestershire 268 to win. They lost Peters first ball, and Moore also fell, but with Lancashire pitching short to Hick, it was 58 for 2 at close.

On the final day, 3 wickets from each of Dominic Cork and Muttiah Muralitharan helped dismiss Worcestershire for 191 runs, with David Wigley unable to bat because of a broken hand sustained when James Anderson bowled a beamer at him in the first innings. After the match Cork talking about his match performance of 7 for 115 said, "The ball is coming out well at the moment. I've worked hard with Mike Watkinson over the winter with it. It's early season and these sort of conditions suit a bowler like myself." Watkinson, in response, spoke of Lancashire's determination to get straight back into the first Division after the disappointment of relegation last season, ""We talked about the start of the season and the need to start well and to get a positive number in the wins column is a good feeling. We have two home games now coming up against Derbyshire and Durham and maybe we can kick on from here." (BBC scorecard)

=== May ===
After celebrating their first win on 30 April, Lancashire then lengthened their win streak to four, with one win in the Championship, one in the C&G Trophy and one in the League, to lie third in the Championship table at 9 May. However, they suffered a nine-wicket loss to table-toppers Durham in the next game to fall down to fourth. There were a further four games in May, and Lancashire won the Trophy second round match, the League match and the University match, and drew their Championship encounter with Somerset to be fifth in the Championship and third in the League at the end of the month.

==== National League: Lancashire v Nottinghamshire (1 May) ====
Lancashire (4pts) beat Nottinghamshire (0pts) by 1 run (D/L method)

Lancashire Lightning held on to win by 1 run after Nottinghamshire Outlaws needed 7 to win off the last over. Earlier new Englishman Stuart Law made 52 as the Lightning got to 178 for 8 off their 43 overs. England fans would have been pleased to see James Anderson take 3 for 18 from his 8 overs in reply as the Outlaws went to 170 for 6 with 12 balls to go, needing 9 to win. But Sajid Mahmood (who only conceded 2 from the penultimate over) and Dominic Cork saw Lancashire win a nailbiter. (BBC scorecard)

==== C&G Trophy Round One: Buckinghamshire v Lancashire (3–4 May) ====
Lancashire beat Buckinghamshire by 51 runs (D/L method) to progress to Round Two of the C&G Trophy

Andrew Crook scored freely for Lancashire at Sir Paul Getty's Ground at Wormsley as he broke Lancashire's one-day record with his 162 not out. Glen Chapple gave support as he scored the competition's fastest ever half-century, making 55 in just 16 balls as the first-class team finished on 370 for 4. They were denied the chance to wrap up the win on the first day though, as rain halted play with Buckinghamshire on 39 for 2. No play was possible on the second day, and with 10.3 overs of Buckinghamshire's innings bowled, a decision was possible on the Duckworth–Lewis method.(BBC scorecard)

==== County Championship: Lancashire v Derbyshire (6–9 May) ====
Lancashire (22pts) beat Derbyshire (3pts) by an innings and 72 runs

Derbyshire batted first at Old Trafford, but fared poorly, being dismissed for 215, with Luke Sutton top-scoring with 95. No one else passed 40, however. James Anderson took 4 for 62, and was the pick of the Lancashire bowlers. In reply, Lancashire made 65 for no loss at stumps on the first day.

Lancashire continued their dominance on the second day, although only 40 overs were possible as they progressed to 175 for 1. The third day saw them finally dismissed for 469, with Mal Loye (101) and Stuart Law (112) making centuries. By close Derbyshire had progressed to 81 for 1, leaving them at least the possibility of a draw. However, that wasn't to be as they plummeted to 182 all out. Spin bowler Gary Keedy was the hero for the home side, taking 6 for 60. (Cricinfo scorecard)

==== County Championship: Lancashire v Durham (11–13 May) ====
Durham (20pts) beat Lancashire (3pts) by 9 wickets

Durham recorded another comprehensive win, this time at Old Trafford. After winning the toss, Lancashire were skittled out for 199, and with Durham making 92 for 2 by close on the first day, they were well on top. This continued on the second day, with Michael Hussey making 144 and wicket-keeper Philip Mustard 77 before they were all out for 338. Muttiah Muralitharan took 5 for 107, bowling 39 of Lancashire's 107 overs. Lancashire were struggling again at 135 for 5 at close, and only managed to make it to 173 on the third day, as Andrew Flintoff was the only Lancashire batsman to pass 20. Durham knocked off the 35 runs required for the loss of one wicket. (Cricinfo scorecard)

==== National League: Lancashire v Northamptonshire (15 May) ====
Lancashire (4pts) beat Northamptonshire (0pts) by seven wickets

Lancashire Lightning eased to a comfortable win against Northamptonshire Steelbacks to go third in the table, two points behind leaders Middlesex Crusaders. Northamptonshire won the toss and batted, but 215 for 7 was never going to be enough on a fine Old Trafford pitch, where Lancashire's Mal Loye smashed 94 not out with ten fours and three sixes. There were good news for England fans as well – Test all-rounder Andrew Flintoff bowled 9 overs for Lancashire without complain from his recently operated ankle, taking the wicket of England prospect Bilal Shafayat in the process. (Cricinfo scorecard)

==== C&G Trophy Round Two: Lancashire v Essex (17 May) ====
Lancashire beat Essex by 6 wickets to progress to the Quarter-Finals of the C&G Trophy

Andrew Flintoff took 4 for 26 in helpful bowling conditions as Essex made only 195 for 9 at Old Trafford. In reply, Lancashire's opening partnership of Mal Loye and Stuart Law put on 53 in 10.1 overs, before Alex Tudor dismissed them both. Brad Hodge, however, kept the run rate up. Hodge was dropped on 32, and Lancashire might have been put under pressure if it had been taken, but instead he went on to make 82 off 102 balls, as Lancashire made there target with 6 wickets and 6 overs to spare. (Cricinfo scorecard)

==== County Championship: Somerset v Lancashire (20–23 May) ====
Lancashire (11pts) drew with Somerset (7pts)

Rain ravaged the match between Somerset and Lancashire allowing little play on the first three days. Between the showers, Lancashire had Somerset at 48 for 2 on the first day, but the little play that was possible after that gave Mike Burns (87) and Sanath Jayasuriya (72 not out after three days) opportunity to increase the score to 195 for 3 on day 3. A draw looked more than likely, even if the sides would agree to forfeiting an innings. The fourth day was a full day of cricket, and Muttiah Muralitharan took five for 56 for Lancashire as they bowled Somerset out for 294. Iain Sutcliffe then lifted Lancashire to four batting points and 351 for 3 declared with his 150, well helped by an unbeaten century from Australian Brad Hodge. (Cricinfo scorecard)

==== MCC University Match: Oxford UCCE v Lancashire (25–27 May) ====
Lancashire won by 10 wickets

A second-string Lancashire side gave away 300 runs to the Oxford students, Stephen Moreton making his first first-class fifty as he top-scored with 74. Gary Keedy took four for 46 for Lancashire. Lancashire replied quickly and well, though, making 420, Andrew Crook top scoring with 88. Oxford then crawled to stumps with 24 runs off 14 overs without losing a wicket. However, the third day wasn't nearly as pleasant for Oxford, as Keedy added six for 33 to get a ten-wicket haul in the match. The students were bowled out for 151, leaving a target of 32 which was chased down by Mark Chilton and Iain Sutcliffe, and the Lancastrians won by ten wickets. (Cricinfo scorecard)

==== National League: Gloucestershire v Lancashire (30 May) ====
Lancashire (4pts) beat Gloucestershire (0pts) by six wickets

Lancashire Lightning were lethal with the ball at Bristol as they beat Gloucestershire Gladiators by six wickets in a low-scoring encounter. Dominic Cork was the most punishing bowler, taking four for 14 off nine overs (including five wides) as Gloucestershire whimpered to 86, as veteran wicketkeeper Mark Alleyne top-scored with 24 not out. Alleyne was one of two Gloucestershire batsmen to make it into double figures. Jon Lewis, who had earlier on in the day been called up to the England ODI squad to meet Bangladesh and Australia, took three for 40, but it was not enough to stop Lancashire from cruising to the target with nearly 25 overs to spare. (Cricinfo scorecard)

=== June ===
June's Championship run began with two draws, and in between they fell to two League defeats against Hampshire and Nottinghamshire. However, they ended the spring season on a high note, beating Derbyshire by one wicket to go third in the County Championship before the teams entered the Twenty20 Cup.

==== County Championship: Lancashire v Northamptonshire (1–4 June) ====
Lancashire (7pts) drew with Northamptonshire (7pts)

There was no play on the first day at Old Trafford because of rain. The weather on the second day allowed only 54 overs, and in that time Northamptonshire made 148 for 5. They were all out for 175 on the third day, after James Anderson took 3 and Muttiah Muralitharan 4 wickets. Lancashire fared worse in reply, slumping to 27 for 5 and 35 for 6, before recovering slightly to 149 all out thanks to 48 from veteran wicket-keeper Warren Hegg. Northants lost 2 quick wickets in their second innings, before ending the third day on 94 for 3. This left a small chance of victory on the final day, but it wasn't to happen. Muralitharan took 4 quick wickets, but the visitors still made 225, a target of 252 runs. Lancashire were saved by captain Mark Chilton who kept his wicket as all about were losing theirs. The opener finished on 113 not out, as Lancashire saved the match ending on 188 for 8. (Cricinfo scorecard)

==== National League: Lancashire v Hampshire (5 June) ====
Hampshire (4pts) beat Lancashire (0pts) by 79 runs

Despite an economical bowling performance from England prospect James Anderson who took two for 18 off 7.5 overs, Lancashire Lightning imploded with the bat at home against Hampshire Hawks who moved out of the relegation zone as they took a 79-run win at Old Trafford. Hampshire batted first, and Derek Kenway top-scored with 65 as they were bowled out for 200, but Lancashire could only muster 121 against Hampshire's strong bowling attack, Chris Tremlett taking three for 30 while off-spinner Shaun Udal took three tail-enders for 11. (Cricinfo scorecard)

==== County Championship: Yorkshire v Lancashire (8–11 June) ====
Yorkshire (10pts) drew with Lancashire (11pts)

Lancashire batted first in the Roses match at Headingley and though opening batsman Mark Chilton was out first ball to Matthew Hoggard his partner Iain Sutcliffe made a free-scoring 153 including 26 boundaries. Former England U-19 pacer Tim Bresnan then struck back with three wickets in four balls to leave Lancashire all out for 379 at stumps on the first day. Yorkshire's 335 in reply included solid innings from Phil Jaques, Craig White and Michael Lumb, while Lancashire's James Anderson took four wickets. Lancashire declared their second innings at 337 for 5, built around a patient 112 from Chilton, and that set Yorkshire 382 for victory. Yorkshire fell to 182 for 8 before a resistant 64 not out from Matthew Hoggard (only his second half-century of his career) saved the draw, as he shared partnerships of 45 for the ninth wicket with Richard Dawson and 46 for the tenth with Deon Kruis. (BBC scorecard)

==== National League: Nottinghamshire v Lancashire (12 June) ====
Nottinghamshire (4pts) beat Lancashire (0pts) by 61 runs

Lancashire crumbled in chase of Nottinghamshire's big target of 250 at Trent Bridge. Winning the toss and fielding, Lancashire got wickets at crucial moments, and had Nottinghamshire at 77 for 5 at one point. However, former England wicketkeeper Chris Read contributed with 68 not out – including five fours and four sixes – and with Mark Ealham scoring 35 as well, only James Anderson managed to stop the rot slightly by removing Ealham. Lancashire's bowling was at times wayward, and 26 wides were noted down in the extras column. In reply, Lancashire sold their wickets all too cheaply, as starts were made but not converted and number nine Dominic Cork top-scored with 40. Lancashire crumbled to 188 all out in 41.3 overs, well short of the target. (Cricinfo scorecard)

==== County Championship: Derbyshire v Lancashire (15–17 June) ====
Lancashire (18pts) beat Derbyshire (3pts) by one wicket

In a low-scoring thriller at The County Ground, Derby, Dominic Cork had the pleasure of beating his old county, though it became a tougher task than expected, considering that Derbyshire had not won a Championship match since 2004. Winning the toss and batting, Derbyshire had a good opening partnership between Australian Michael Di Venuto and Ben France, but Greg Chapple put the pressure on with some patient, economical bowling and reaped the rewards with three wickets for 29. However, it was Cork who got the most wickets, after taking the last three of the innings to finish with four for 40 and send Derbyshire off for 191. Lancashire lost two quick wickets in reply, and were in trouble when Warren Hegg departed at 128 for 6, but a fine innings worth 64 from Cork down the order – along with 24 from Muttiah Muralitharan – sent Lancashire into a 50-run lead. Muralitharan was in contention for Man of the Match, bowling 27 overs in succession and taking six for 50 as Derbyshire collapsed to 185, setting a target of 136 to win. Lancashire thought that would be a walk in the park, especially as Iain Sutcliffe and Mal Loye paired up for 53 for the second wicket, but they then lost seven men for sub-12 scores and were in trouble at 131 for 9. Only Sutcliffe kept his head calm, carrying his bat to 62 not out, and he and Muralitharan managed to add the required five runs. (Cricinfo scorecard)

=== Twenty20 Cup Group Stage (22 June-6 July) ===
Lancashire recorded six wins in their first seven games, only losing to Nottinghamshire Outlaws, but beating Roses rivals Yorkshire Phoenix twice. They thus qualified for the quarter-finals with one game to spare – which was then rained off.

==== Yorkshire v Lancashire (22 June) ====
Lancashire (2pts) beat Yorkshire (0pts) by five wickets

Phil Jaques, an Australian, was the dominant figure for the Yorkshire Phoenix in the Roses battle, scoring 72 from number three before being out to countryman Brad Hodge. That lifted the hosts to 165 for 7, but that was not enough to defend. Matthew Hoggard, the England Test bowler, showed an uncanny knack of being uneconomical, conceding 65 runs in his four overs, and despite two wickets he lost the game for the Phoenix. Brad Hodge ended with 64 not out for the visiting Lancashire Lightning as they won with seventeen balls to spare. (Cricinfo scorecard)

==== Nottinghamshire v Lancashire (24 June) ====
Nottinghamshire (2pts) beat Lancashire (0pts) by 92 runs

Nottinghamshire Outlaws plundered runs off the Lancashire Lightning fast bowlers at Trent Bridge, to recover from their first-game loss to Leicestershire. Both James Anderson and Glen Chapple were taken for 53 in four overs each, as the Outlaws made 198 for 5. In reply, only Steven Crook passed 20 for Lancashire, Graeme Swann took three for 32 and Mark Ealham two for 22, and Lancashire ended up with an inadequate 106 all out. (Cricinfo scorecard)

==== Lancashire v Leicestershire (27 June) ====
Lancashire (2pts) beat Leicestershire (0pts) by eight wickets

HD Ackerman was the only one who resisted a patient bowling display from Lancashire Lightning at their home ground, Old Trafford. Muttiah Muralitharan, the Sri Lankan off-spinner, took four for 19 in four overs, yet Ackerman made 79 not out amid the carnage, lifting Leicestershire Foxes to 146 for 7. However, Stuart Law took matters into his own hands, bludgeoning twelve fours and four sixes on his way to 92 not out – the highest score of the season so far – and Lancashire won with four wickets and 23 deliveries to spare. (Cricinfo scorecard)

==== Lancashire v Derbyshire (29 June) ====
Lancashire (2pts) beat Derbyshire (0pts) by 66 runs

Brad Hodge and 23 wides gave Lancashire Lightning a competitive total against Derbyshire Phantoms, making 164 for 8 despite Kevin Dean's spell of one for 16 from four overs. Hodge made 44 off 34 balls, and Dominic Cork – promoted to five – made 28, the only ones to pass 20. Hodge, who came on as fourth change bowler, fuelled the Derbyshire implosion with wickets, as they couldn't hit the ball off the square and were all out for 98 – Hodge ending with figures of four for 17. (Cricinfo scorecard)

==== Lancashire v Yorkshire (1 July) ====
Lancashire (2pts) beat Yorkshire (0pts) by 110 runs

Lancashire Lightning recorded the most emphatic victory by runs in the 2005 Twenty20 season, as they had fun with the Yorkshire Phoenix bowlers. After being put in to bat, Mal Loye and Stuart Law put on 106 for the first wicket, and when Loye departed for 47 Brad Hodge followed up with a 17-ball 33, a partnership of 77 with Law. Despite Ian Harvey digging into them with two wickets, the early run-rate ensured that Lancashire set a target of 208, Law recording the second Twenty20 century this season – in 56 balls. Ian Harvey, the man responsible for the first of those centuries, was out early for 1, and wickets fell to everyone as Yorkshire were out for 97 – Dominic Cork taking three for 10, Muttiah Muralitharan three for 17, and James Anderson two for 26. Matthew Hoggard and Tim Bresnan recorded the highest partnership for Yorkshire, with 22 for the tenth wicket. (Cricinfo scorecard)

==== Lancashire v Durham (3 July) ====
Lancashire (2pts) beat Durham (0pts) by 37 runs

Mal Loye and Brad Hodge helped Lancashire Lightning to recover after Stuart Law was stumped in the second over off Durham Dynamos medium-pacer Neil Killeen. Loye and Hodge paired up for 169 for the second wicket, as Loye became the second Lancastrian to score a Twenty20 century this season before he was eventually caught off Nathan Astle's bowling for 100. Lancashire closed on 208 for 4, and only Killeen conceded less than 30 runs of Durham's six bowlers. Astle got the best bowling figures, with two for 37, but his batting helped little – 55 for 37 was never enough to keep up with the asking rate of 10.5. When Durham realised that, they tried to lash out, and a result, wickets tumbled to Glen Chapple and Dominic Cork and Durham finished their 20 overs with the score on 171 for 7. (Cricinfo scorecard)

==== Derbyshire v Lancashire (4 July) ====
Lancashire (2pts) beat Derbyshire (0pts) by 50 runs (D/L method)

Big scores from Stuart Law (67) and Brad Hodge (90 not out) helped Lancashire Lightning to a massive 205 for 2 at The County Ground, Derby, medium-pacer Ian Hunter taking both wickets. Law and Hodge shared a 154-run stand for the second wicket. Two early wickets from former England ODI player James Anderson pegged Derbyshire Phantoms back, and Brad Hodge took four for 27 – his second Twenty20 four-wicket-haul of the season – to reduce Derbyshire to 106 for 7, before rain intervened with 5.3 overs left in the game. The rain never relented, and it was calculated that Derbyshire's par score was 156, thus Lancashire took a convincing 50-run victory. The victory meant that Lancashire qualified for the quarter-finals with one game to spare. (Cricinfo scorecard)

==== Durham v Lancashire (6 July) ====
Match abandoned; Durham (1pt), Lancashire (1pt)

As Lancashire Lightning were already through and Durham Dynamos already knocked out of the Twenty20 Cup, the rain at the Riverside Ground mattered little. Both sides shared a point in the game. (Cricinfo scorecard)

==== Final Table (North Division) ====
North Division Standings
Team	M	W	L	NR	Pts	NRR
Lancashire Lightning	8	6	1	1	13	+1.77
Leicestershire Foxes	8	5	2	1	11	+0.25
Derbyshire Phantoms	8	4	3	1	9	−0.45
Yorkshire Phoenix	8	3	5	0	6	−0.70
Durham Dynamos	8	2	5	1	5	−0.87
Nottinghamshire Outlaws	8	2	6	0	4	+0.13

=== July ===
The Championship season started again on 8 July, and Lancashire carried their winning ways from the Twenty20 Cup into this tournament, as they beat Durham by an innings and 228 runs to go second in the table, 11 points behind Durham. They followed that up with quarter-final wins in the Twenty20 Cup and C&G Trophy, before suffering their first loss of July with an eight-wicket League defeat to later champions Essex Eagles. The East Anglians stayed for a County Championship match, where 1100-odd runs were scored for the loss of eleven wickets in a draw. In the last week-end of July, Lancashire travelled to The Oval for the Twenty20 Cup finals day, where they beat Surrey quite easily in the semi-final but crashed to a seven-wicket defeat in the final at the hands of Somerset Sabres.

==== County Championship: Durham v Lancashire (8–11 July) ====
Lancashire (22pts) beat Durham (1pt) by an innings and 228 runs

Durham were a prime example of how the lack of three men can change a team. Three months earlier, Michael Hussey, Paul Collingwood and Steve Harmison had been firing for the Durham lads as they beat Leicestershire by an innings and 216 runs, the highest margin of victory in the County Championship so far this season – before this match. Without these three, and only with Nathan Astle and Ashley Noffke by way of replacement, they collapsed to 167 against the bowling of Glen Chapple and Gary Keedy, before Mal Loye made a double ton and Dominic Cork an unbeaten ton to give Lancashire a 363-run lead on first innings. Then, Chapple took four for 18, as Durham rolled over yet again for 135 – and all of a sudden the league leaders were transformed into laughing stocks. (Cricinfo scorecard)

==== C&G Trophy Quarter-Final: Lancashire v Sussex (15 July) ====
Lancashire beat Sussex by 35 runs to progress to the Semi-Finals of the C&G Trophy

Andrew Symonds scored 101 and took two wickets for 46 to be the difference between the sides at Old Trafford. Having been sent in to bat, Lancashire owed much of their success to a partnership of 118 between Symonds and Marcus North, and good lower-order hitting took the total to 249 for 8, despite three wickets each from Sussex' Pakistanis, Rana Naved-ul-Hasan and Mushtaq Ahmed. The Sussex chase looked on when they were 112 for 1 with Matt Prior and Chris Adams at the crease, as they were just waiting for opportunities to up the run-rate, but instead Symonds and England all-rounder Andrew Flintoff ran through them with the ball, and Robin Martin-Jenkins and Ahmed eventually had to consolidate to 214 for 8, losing by 35 runs. (Cricinfo scorecard)

==== National League: Lancashire v Derbyshire (18 July) ====
Lancashire beat Derbyshire by 17 runs to progress to the Semi-Finals of the Twenty20 Cup

After Mal Loye's boundary-filled 73, off just 32 balls, Derbyshire Phantoms were probably happy that they escaped with conceding 189 runs in their game with Lancashire Lightning at Old Trafford. Lancashire tried to employ pinch hitters such as Dominic Cork and Glen Chapple to get the runs flowing quickly, but they disappointed slightly, hitting at just over a run a ball. Derbyshire's chase looked possible despite Gary Keedy taking the wickets of Michael Di Venuto and Jonathan Moss, two danger men, early on – as they were 121 for 3 – but Keedy dug out another wicket, and that spurred a collapse to 139 for 8, part-time off-spinner Andrew Crook joining in with two for 35. Derbyshire needed some big hits from the specialist bowlers in the end, and crumbled to 172 with three balls remaining, James Anderson getting the honour of taking the last wicket. (Cricinfo scorecard)

==== National League: Lancashire v Essex (19 July) ====
Essex (4pts) beat Lancashire (0pts) by eight wickets (D/L method)

In cloudy conditions at Old Trafford, Essex Eagles took full advantage after shaking Lancashire Lightning's batting order in a match shortened to 40 overs a side. Only Iain Sutcliffe and Mark Chilton passed 15, while spinners Danish Kaneria and James Middlebrook shared five wickets between them. Lancashire eventually finished on 154 for 8, and Essex were set 156 to win due to a small rain-interruption in Lancashire's innings. Despite two wickets from James Anderson, Essex cruised to the target with more than seven overs to spare, Grant Flower making 66 and Ravinder Bopara an unbeaten 45. (Cricinfo scorecard)

==== County Championship: Lancashire v Essex (21–24 July) ====
Lancashire (10pts) drew with Essex (9pts)

Essex batted resolutely and calmly, without any rush until the fifth session, and quietly worked their way to 536 for 9 declared at Old Trafford. Grant Flower made a healthy 115 before being caught behind off Gary Keedy, while his brother Andy made 138. Australian Andrew Crook got the best figures for Lancashire, three for 71 with his part-time off-spin, but he was also very expensive in only ten overs. Lancashire number three Mal Loye replied with 194 after Andre Adams had dug out the hosts' captain Mark Chilton for 4, as the match ground towards an inevitable draw, Loye spending 200 balls for his century and eventually spending nearly eight hours at the crease before being caught by Alastair Cook off Grant Flower, six runs short of what could have been his second double century in July 2005. Lancashire eventually batted out a mammoth 220.3 overs – Danish Kaneria bowling 70.2 of those without a single wicket – to make 655 for 6 before the captains agreed to a draw. (Cricinfo scorecard)

==== Twenty20 Cup Semi-Final: Lancashire v Surrey (30 July) ====
Lancashire won by 20 runs and qualified for the Twenty20 Cup final

In the first of two semi-finals at The Oval on the Twenty20 Cup finals day, Lancashire Lightning lived up to expectations by smashing 217 for 4 in twenty overs against Surrey Lions – well helped by eleven wides and six penalty runs, although Lancashire's top five all contributed. Only Nayan Doshi came away with some face on the bowling side, taking two for 35, but with Andrew Flintoff making 49 and Andrew Symonds an unbeaten 52 the target quickly reached dangerously high levels – from a Surrey perspective, anyway.

Ali Brown and James Benning started well with an opening partnership of 93, as Dominic Cork and James Anderson were taken for runs, but Benning, Scott Newman, Brown and Rikki Clarke fell in quick succession to see Surrey struggle at 104 for 4. Mark Ramprakash and Azhar Mahmood upped the ante again, but when Flintoff and Anderson broke through with one wicket each, and Surrey crumbled to 195 for 7. (Cricinfo scorecard)

==== Twenty20 Cup Final: Lancashire v Somerset (30 July) ====
Somerset beat Lancashire by seven wickets and won the 2005 Twenty20 Cup

Somerset Sabres completed their run by springing the final upset to beat Lancashire Lightning in the Twenty20 Cup final. It should perhaps have been renamed Sixteen16, because rain earlier in the day delayed the schedule and meant that the final had been shortened to 16 overs a side, while the semi-finals had both been 20 overs. However, Somerset didn't mind – their strongest batsmen were their numbers one and two, Graeme Smith and Marcus Trescothick, and the more relative impact these two would have, the better for the Sabres. Their task was made easier, though, as Somerset fast bowler Andy Caddick dug out a couple of early Lancashire wickets, which was followed a run-out and two wickets in two balls from Richard Johnson, as Lancashire crawled to 41 for 5.

Australian-born Stuart Law stood tall at the crease, defying the Somerset bowlers to make 59 before being run out on the very last ball, but Somerset only needed 115 from 16 overs – a run rate of 7.19. Smith and Trescothick started positively, before Trescothick's England team-mate Andrew Flintoff had him edge behind to Warren Hegg for 10. With two more wickets falling, Lancashire would perhaps have fancied their chances with the Somerset score on 65 for 3, but Smith defied them with an unbeaten 64, adding 53 in a fourth-wicket stand with young James Hildreth to guide Somerset to the target with seven wickets and eleven balls to spare. (Cricinfo scorecard)

=== August ===
August began with a seven-wicket loss in a one-day tour match to Bangladesh A, before a 234-run Championship win over Leicestershire sent them second in the table with a game in hand. Three National League matches followed – with two wins and a loss – before they drew with Yorkshire for the second time in the Championship season, sending them out of the promotion zone as they trailed Yorkshire by 1.5 points. The day after the Championship draw with Yorkshire finished, they travelled to Edgbaston for the C&G Trophy semi-final, where they lost to Warwickshire. Two more one-day defeats followed, but their last match in August was an innings win in the Championship, which meant that they saw out August in second place.

==== Tour Match: Lancashire v Bangladesh A (1 August) ====
Bangladesh A won by seven wickets (D/L Method)

Lancashire put out a second-string side against Bangladesh A, admittedly including former ODI bowler Sajid Mahmood, and were duly punished by the tourists, who cruised to a seven-wicket victory. Having won the toss, the Bangladeshis chose to bowl at Lancashire, and after Andrew Crook and Iain Sutcliffe had put on 35 for the first wicket, Shahadat Hossain dug out two quick wickets. Lancashire recovered somewhat before rain stopped play for nearly two hours, but when the players returned, Abdur Razzak ran through the middle order. He took three wickets for 25, and Lancashire collapsed to 149, with two run outs. Bangladesh were set 152 to win due to the rain interruption, and the tourists scored slowly before Tushar Imran came to the crease. Tushar took 91 balls to forge 93 runs, his sixth one-day fifty, as he guided Bangladesh A to a total of 155 for 3 with more than 15 overs remaining in the match. (Cricinfo scorecard)

==== County Championship: Leicestershire v Lancashire (3–6 August) ====
Lancashire (19pts) beat Leicestershire (5pts) by 234 runs

Leicestershire were in the game at Grace Road for exactly two days, after having Lancashire effectively 68 for 3 in the second innings. However, they lost it from there, and Lancashire took the win to go into second place in the Championship table. Lancashire had won the toss and batted first, with Iain Sutcliffe top scoring with 93, as nine batsmen made it into double figures but only Sutcliffe managed a fifty. Medium pacer Ryan Cummins got three for 32 in his first game for Leicestershire, but only bowled ten overs, as the captain preferred an ineffective but economical Claude Henderson. After making their way to 16 for 0 on the first day, Leicestershire fell apart twice, first from 69 for 0 to 78 for 4 and then from 160 for 5 to 183 for 8. However, Aftab Habib made 84 to lift them to 261, only 30 behind Lancashire's first-innings score.

In Lancashire's second innings, Ottis Gibson got two quick wickets as Lancashire fell to 22 for 3 shortly before stumps on the second day, but Australians Stuart Law and Andrew Symonds batted well together with a 111-run partnership before Law was out to Henderson. Symonds powered on from there, bludgeoning 17 fours in his 121, and Glen Chapple and Warren Hegg made season-best scores of 60 and 77 respectively as they added for 121 for the eighth wicket. Lancashire declared on 368 for 9, not bothering to send in James Anderson to bat, thinking he might be better use with the ball. He was – he took three for 39 before stumps on day three, as Leicestershire collapsed to 78 for 5 in chase of 399. There wasn't much respite on the fourth day either – after Dinesh Mongia and Habib had added 27, Anderson came back with two quick wickets, finishing with five for 79. Dominic Cork and debutant leg-spinner Simon Marshall wrapped up the Leicestershire chase as they were all out for 164. (Cricinfo scorecard)

==== National League: Northamptonshire v Lancashire (8 August) ====
Lancashire (4pts) beat Northamptonshire (0pts) by 64 runs

Despite four for 39 from Johann Louw, Lancashire Lightning recovered well from an early position of 52 for 3 against Northamptonshire Steelbacks. 80 from Andrew Symonds, a quick 44 from Dominic Cork and a captain's innings of 36 from Mark Chilton, took the score to 236 for 9. James Anderson, the former England ODI player, took three quick wickets to leave Northamptonshire struggling at 35 for 4, and from then on, it only went downwards for the Steelbacks. Andrew Crook wrapped up the innings with three cheap lower order wickets, and Northamptonshire crumbled to 172 all out. (Cricinfo scorecard)

==== National League: Hampshire v Lancashire (10 August) ====
Hampshire (4pts) beat Lancashire (0pts) by eight runs

Hampshire Hawks recovered to post a challenging target after early setbacks, caused by two wickets from Lancashire Lightning spinner Andrew Symonds and losing Nic Pothas early through a run out. They struggled to 86 for 4 before Shane Watson put them back on track with an unbeaten 106, helped by Greg Lamb, who made 42. In a match dominated by foreign or foreign-born players, Marcus North and Symonds put on a 94-run partnership to help Lancashire to 155 for 2. However, Australian all-rounder Andy Bichel took three for 34, Dimitri Mascarenhas rounded off his nine overs by taking two wickets with the two last balls, and Lancashire were left to score 23 from 24 balls with a wicket in hand. James Anderson tried, hitting two fours, but with nine required off ten balls he was lbw to Shaun Udal for nine to give Hampshire an eight-run victory. (Cricinfo scorecard)

==== National League: Glamorgan v Lancashire (14 August) ====
Lancashire (4pts) beat Glamorgan (0pts) by eight wickets

Lancashire Lightning recorded a relatively easy victory at Colwyn Bay, beating Glamorgan Dragons by eight wickets. Dominic Cork took four for 37 as the Dragons crashed to 173 all out, Alex Wharf – who had been promoted to three as pinch hitter – top scoring with 36. Mal Loye then carried Lancashire past the target with 79 not out, while Stuart Law, Marcus North and Andrew Symonds all passed 25. (Cricinfo scorecard)

==== County Championship: Lancashire v Yorkshire (16–19 August) ====
Lancashire (11pts) drew with Yorkshire (11pts)

Craig White and Matthew Wood gave Yorkshire control of the first day of the Roses clash against Lancashire. Wood made 86 and White 110 not out, while the Lancashire captain Mark Chilton was stumped for options and had to turn to part-time spinner Marcus North for seven overs of bowling – which yielded the wicket of Ismail Dawood. Thanks to hard hitting from Deon Kruis, who finished with 35, Yorkshire ended their innings on 417 after 125 overs, James Anderson taking the number 10 and 11 to end with three wickets, the same number as Glen Chapple. Lancashire set about chasing the total with a massive opening partnership between Chilton and Iain Sutcliffe – the pair added 223 and battered Chris Silverwood out of the attack, as the opening bowler was left with 13 of Yorkshire's 157.1 overs.

Sutcliffe was eventually dismissed seven runs short of a century, caught by wicket-keeper Dawood off Tim Bresnan's bowling, and Bresnan got another wicket when he trapped Mal Loye lbw. Bresnan and Deon Kruis were Yorkshire's best bowlers, sharing nine of the ten wickets, and starting with Sutcliffe's dismissal, Lancashire lost five wickets for 27 runs to Bresnan and Kruis. However, 146 from Andrew Symonds, and half-centuries from Dominic Cork and Warren Hegg gave Lancashire a 120-run lead. Yorkshire batted to stumps on day three without loss, and survived 89 overs on the fourth day with ease. Craig White, Anthony McGrath and Matthew Wood all made fifties for Yorkshire, while no Lancashire bowler got more than one wicket. Yorkshire remained 2.5 points ahead of Lancashire in the Championship table, but were third following Essex' victory over Derbyshire. (Cricinfo scorecard)

==== C&G Trophy Semi-Final: Warwickshire v Lancashire (20 August) ====
Warwickshire beat Lancashire by 99 runs to progress to the C&G Trophy Final

Warwickshire put in a fine bowling effort to send Lancashire out of the C&G Trophy, despite Lancashire's Australian Marcus North taking three wickets. North's bowling – and others, Sajid Mahmood took two wickets – set Warwickshire back to 155 for 7, but Michael Powell and Trevor Frost put on an eighth-wicket partnership of 81 runs to carry Warwickshire to a total of 236 for 8 after 50 overs. Lancashire looked on track when Mal Loye and Stuart Law negotiated some tricky early bowling to put on 49 for the fourth wicket and see the score to 80 for 3, but medium pacer Jamie Anyon took two wickets, and a fiery spell from Neil Carter, which included two wickets to see him end with four for 26, had Lancashire bowled out for 137. (Cricinfo scorecard)

==== National League: Lancashire v Gloucestershire (22 August) ====
Gloucestershire (4pts) beat Lancashire (0pts) by six wickets

Three centuries were recorded at Old Trafford, as Gloucestershire Gladiators snatched a victory over the hosting Lancashire Lightning after being regarded with no chance earlier on. The Gladiators won the toss and got immediate success, as Jon Lewis dismissed Mal Loye with the second ball of the day, but pretty much everything went against Gloucestershire from then on, as Stuart Law, Mark Chilton and Andrew Symonds flayed the bowling to all corners. Symonds took 88 balls for his century, and went on to make 129 before being bowled by James Averis – who finished with four for 40. Law and Chilton also made fifties, but Averis' late spell and a slow 39-ball 11 from Marcus North ensured that the total ended on 267 for 7. Then, James Anderson had three men caught off his bowling, as Gloucestershire crashed to 47 for 4. However, Anderson finished his spell, and Ramnaresh Sarwan crafted a century – which was shortly followed by Mark Hardinges reaching his first one-day century of his career, and in the process lifting his List A career batting average from 14.23 to 17.50, still below par for a specialist batsman like Hardinges. However, the pair added 221 runs in 116 minutes for the fifth wicket, hitting six sixes along the way, as they guided Gloucestershire out of the relegation zone in the National League. (Cricinfo scorecard)

==== National League: Lancashire v Worcestershire (24 August) ====
Worcestershire (4pts) beat Lancashire (0pts) by four wickets

Chris Gayle, Worcestershire's new overseas player after Shoaib Akhtar left to play in the 2005 Afro-Asia Cup, helped Worcestershire Royals to an important victory in the National League, while Lancashire Lightning suffered their third one-day defeat in five days. Having won the toss and batted, Lancashire regularly lost wickets, and the innings of Australian Marcus North was symptomatic – he made a 19-ball 2. Stuart Law, however, scored 82, and was along with Glen Chapple the only batsman to really keep up the scoring rate. Lancashire could only muster a total of 195 for 9, and defending that target quickly became difficult ash Gayle slashed eight fours and a six on his way to a 41-ball 53. Despite Chapple's returns of 9–0–23–4 and Anderson taking two for 47, Worcestershire made it to the target with four wickets and 5.3 overs in hand. (Cricinfo scorecard)

==== County Championship: Lancashire v Worcestershire (25–28 August) ====
Lancashire (22pts) beat Worcestershire (6pts) by an innings and 73 runs

Lancashire recorded an innings victory at Stanley Park in Blackpool against Worcestershire to go second in the Division Two table of the County Championship. Mal Loye and Stuart Law made centuries in the first innings, which became a very difficult one for the Worcestershire bowlers. On the second day, Worcestershire finally got some breakthroughs, as Loye was dismissed for 187 and North for 60, and Lancashire could declare with a total of 562 for 8. Chris Gayle played an innings in typical fashion, hitting eight fours from 25 deliveries before he was bowled by Dominic Cork for 43. Cork also got Graeme Hick for a duck, as Worcestershire closed the second day on 111 for 3. Ben Smith and Vikram Solanki fought back, however, pairing up for 140 for the fourth wicket, and Worcestershire looked confident of avoiding the follow-on with the score on 330 for 4. However, two wickets from Andrew Symonds and three from James Anderson ended the Worcestershire effort for 376, still trailing by 186.

Mark Chilton enforced the follow on, and things went from bad to worse for the visitors. No batsman passed 25, Glen Chapple got four wickets for Lancashire, and by the close Worcestershire were 112 for 9 – needing 72 to avoid an innings defeat. However, with the tenth ball of the fourth day Chapple dismissed Kabir Ali to end with five for 32, and Warwickshire were all out for 113. (Cricinfo scorecard)

=== September ===
A four-day match starting on 30 August at Wantage Road in Northamptonshire, however, ended in defeat, as did a one-day game in Essex. Four days later they came back to defeat Essex in the Championship to secure promotion, before suffering their fourth consecutive League loss in succession – this time to Middlesex Crusaders – which left the relegation battle in Division Two wide open, with four teams tied on points from sixth to ninth place, thus Lancashire's match with Worcestershire on 25 September looked to be crucial. Lancashire lost their final Championship match of the season, as Leicestershire took a four-run victory, yet won the Division Two with a seven-point margin to runners-up Durham, and escaped relegation on the final day of the National League with a 75-run win over Worcestershire – sending their opponents down in Division Two.

==== County Championship: Northamptonshire v Lancashire (30 August-2 September) ====
Northamptonshire (19pts) beat Lancashire (6pts) by 285 runs

Northamptonshire recorded their fourth win of the season thanks to their top order batting and their spin bowling. They had won the toss and batted, placing themselves well at 224 for 4, but the last six wickets yielded only 63 runs, and Lancashire seamer Dominic Cork could take three late wickets to end with four for 27. Northamptonshire were bowled out early on the second morning for 289, but immediately hit back, Damien Wright dismissing Lancashire's captain Mark Chilton for 0. In a bowling effort dominated by spinners – Jason Brown and Monty Panesar sharing 68 of the 94 overs bowled – Northamptonshire tugged away, and but for Stuart Law's 111, the hosts might have got a first innings lead. However, it was Lancashire who got a lead of 12, with Brown taking five for 113 from 36.3 overs.

James Anderson then took two early wickets, leading to a long bowling effort for him – he bowled 28 overs, but could not add to his wicket tally, while Usman Afzaal ran away to 147, adding 183 with Bilal Shafayat. Northamptonshire declared eight overs into the last day, with the score 400 for 6 to unleash their spinners on Lancashire's batting line-up – and they did so very successfully. Brown got his second five-for of the match, ending with match figures of ten for 135, and Monty Panesar also got three wickets as Lancashire collapsed in a heap for 103 – with only Chilton passing 20, in a reversal of fortunes from the first innings. (Cricinfo scorecard)

==== National League: Essex v Lancashire (7 September) ====
Essex (4pts) beat Lancashire (0pts) by 55 runs

Dutch–South African Ryan ten Doeschate hammered a career-best 89 not out as Essex Eagles powered their way to 273 for 6 at Chelmsford. His innings included five sixes and four fours, as Sajid Mahmood was the main recipient of his boundary-hitting – ending with figures of two for 67 in nine overs. England Under-19 player Tom Smith, who had taken 15 Test wickets in three U-19 matches with Sri Lanka, proved that the gap between Under-19 cricket and List A cricket is huge, as he finished with 42 off his five overs. When Lancashire Lightning batted, Darren Gough got an early wicket of Iain Sutcliffe, and despite scores in the 30s from Andrew Crook and Mal Loye, Lancashire lost their first four wickets for 91 runs. Andrew Symonds rebuilt with Mark Chilton, but once Symonds was bowled by Gough – who ended with four for 31 – there was nowhere to hide for Lancashire. Kyle Hogg blitzed his way to 36, lifting Lancashire to 218, but they still suffered a comprehensive loss. (Cricinfo scorecard)

==== County Championship: Essex v Lancashire (9–11 September) ====
Lancashire (20pts) beat Essex (5pts) by eight wickets

Lancashire's Indian spinner Murali Kartik got match figures of ten for 168 at The County Ground, Chelmsford, helping them to promotion in Division Two of the County Championship with two weeks to spare. Essex won the toss and chose to bat first, and were bowled out for 267, Kartik taking five and James Anderson three wickets. They struggled to 145 for 7, despite Alastair Cook's 64, but James Middlebrook and Andre Adams rescued them to two batting points in the first innings. Iain Sutcliffe and Mark Chilton added 94 for the first wicket, but Adams and Danish Kaneria fought back with two wickets each, as Lancashire ended on 139 for 4. On the second day, Andrew Symonds and Glen Chapple both made fifties, sharing a 136-run stand with sent Lancashire to 340 – before spinners Middlebrook and Danish Kaneria removed the last four wickets for no further score.

In the last session of the second day, Kartik took four wickets, and despite six double-digit scores Essex completed the day on 134 for 6, only leading by 61 runs. Sajid Mahmood then took two on the third day to finish Essex off for 227, setting Lancashire 155 to win, and a 106-run opening stand between Mark Chilton and Iain Sutcliffe brought them to the brink. Two wickets from Kaneria did not stop them, as Law hit an unbeaten 13 to power on to an eight-wicket victory, Sutcliffe ending with 80 not out as Lancashire won by eight wickets. (Cricinfo scorecard)

==== National League: Lancashire v Middlesex (18 September) ====
Middlesex (4pts) beat Lancashire (0pts) by 44 runs

Middlesex Crusaders' middle-order batsman Jamie Dalrymple took the Lancashire Lightning bowlers on to hit 63 from 33 balls in the late overs of the match at Old Trafford, as the Lightning were sent into the relegation zone in Division One. Middlesex batted first, with Paul Weekes and Ed Smith adding 90 for the first wicket, before Murali Kartik broke through thrice – ending with three for 43. Owais Shah and Dalrymple added 76 for the fourth wicket, however, hitting 21 boundaries on their way to half-centuries, and Middlesex posted a total of 263 for 4. Mal Loye swatted two sixes and a four before being caught by Dalrymple for 19, who took four catches in the Lancashire innings – including one off his own bowling. The Lightning fell to 94 for 5, with four Middlesex bowlers getting one wicket each, and despite all-rounder Glen Chapple recording his first one-day half-century of the season with 71, and they were bowled out for 219 an over before the end. (Cricinfo scorecard)

==== County Championship: Lancashire v Leicestershire (21–23 September) ====
Leicestershire (17pts) beat Lancashire (3pts) by four runs

Leicestershire prevailed in a match at Old Trafford where 726 runs were scored in four completed innings and Leicestershire's young bowler Stuart Broad and captain HD Ackerman starred. Leicestershire chose to bat after winning the toss, and were taken apart by Glen Chapple and Murali Kartik, who shared nine wickets, while the highest partnership for Leicestershire was worth 53. The lack of veteran bowler Dominic Cork did not seem to bother Lancashire unduly, as Chapple got five wickets for 22 runs and Kartik four for 43. Only Jon Maunders and HD Ackerman passed 20 for the visitors, and they were all out for 165. Lancashire accumulated runs slowly, and their score was 61 for 2 at the close of play on the first day. With Mal Loye out with an injury, Lancashire posted 191, Maunders taking four for 28 and Stuart Broad three for 57 to limit Lancashire's lead to 26 runs. An opening partnership of 63 saw Leicestershire take the lead, but spinners Murali Kartik and Andrew Symonds took two wickets each, while the three seamers Chapple, Sajid Mahmood and Anderson took one each to round off the day. Ackerman was left overnight on 37 – 11 short of the highest score in the match so far.

Ackerman added 30 to his overnight score, but was eventually bowled by Anderson, who took three wickets on the third day to end with innings figures of four for 45. Lancashire were set 175 to win, and at one point needed 102 with nine wickets in hand. However, England Under-19 prodigy Stuart Broad removed three men for five runs with his seam bowling, and wickets fell regularly after that – Dinesh Mongia and Charl Willoughby taking two each. Lancashire eventually needed 18 for the last wicket to win, and Mal Loye stepped in to bat despite an injury – he battled for half an hour, scoring three runs, but his batting partner Anderson was caught by Darren Robinson, leaving Lancashire all out for 170, five runs short of victory. However, despite the loss, Lancashire were almost assured of the Division Two victory, as their main competitors Yorkshire were still trailing in their match with Northamptonshire. (Cricinfo scorecard)

==== National League: Worcestershire v Lancashire (25 September) ====
Lancashire (4pts) beat Worcestershire (0pts) by 75 runs

Lancashire Lightning ensured continued survival in Division One of the National League with a victory over Worcestershire Royals in a rain-shortened match that was cut down from 45 to 33 overs. David Leatherdale and Gareth Batty took early wickets, as Lancashire lost their first four wickets for 65 runs, but Glen Chapple and Stuart Law added 84 for the fifth wicket, and Kyle Hogg also provided quick runs as Lancashire ended on 186 for 8. The six Lancashire bowlers then shared out wickets, as James Anderson ended with three for 12 including England batsman Vikram Solanki, while spinners Murali Kartik and Andrew Symonds took two each as Worcestershire were bowled out for 111. No Worcestershire batsman passed 25, and thus Worcestershire fell down into Division Two. (Cricinfo scorecard)
