= 2010 Twenty20 Cup final =

English cricket match

2010 Twenty20 Cup Final
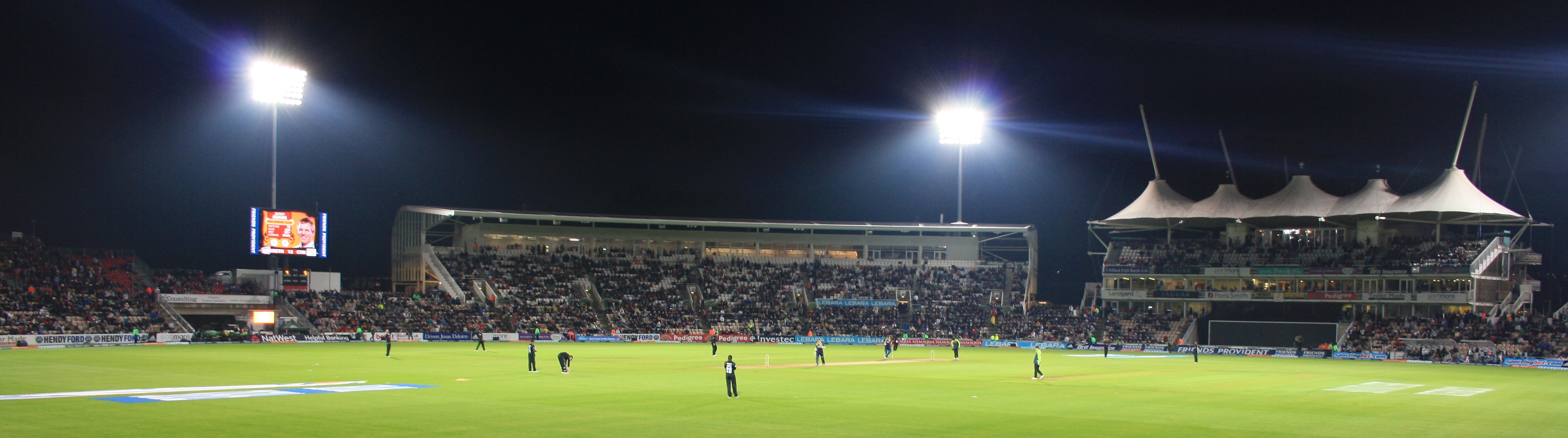
- Event: 2010 Twenty20 Cup
Somerset	Hampshire
173/6	173/5
20 overs	20 overs
- Hampshire won by losing fewer wickets
- Date: 14 August 2010
- Venue: Rose Bowl, Southampton
- Man of the match: Neil McKenzie (Hampshire)
- Umpires: Rob Bailey and Richard Illingworth

The 2010 Twenty20 Cup Final, known for sponsorship purposes as the 2010 Friends Provident t20 Final, was a 20 overs-per-side cricket match between Hampshire County Cricket Club and Somerset County Cricket Club played on 14 August 2010 at the Rose Bowl in Southampton. It was the eighth final of the Twenty20 Cup.

Hampshire were making their first appearance in a Twenty20 final, while Somerset were playing in their third, and their second in successive years, having previously won the Twenty20 Cup in 2005. Having won the toss, Somerset chose to bat first and reached 173 for six; (Note: "173 for six" is cricket notation which could also be written 173/6, and signifies that the batting team has scored 173 runs, and has lost six of its ten wickets. See Scoring (cricket) for more information.) Craig Kieswetter was their highest scorer with 71 runs, but was criticised for his slow start. Kieron Pollard was hit in the eye by a bouncer while batting, and had to be taken to hospital, meaning he was not available to bowl for Somerset. In reply, Hampshire reached 62 from their six-over powerplay, but then lost a cluster of wickets. A steadying partnership between Neil McKenzie and Sean Ervine took them to the brink of victory, but another pair of wickets lost led to a tense finish. The scores were eventually tied, and Hampshire won the title having lost fewer wickets.

== Background ==
The Twenty20 Cup was a 20 overs-per-side competition established in England and Wales in 2003, which replaced the 50 overs-per-side Benson & Hedges Cup. The 20-over format was introduced by the England and Wales Cricket Board because they believed that a shorter version of the game was needed in order to attract families to matches. In 2010, it was one of three tournaments played by first-class county cricket teams, in what the Wisden Cricketers' Almanack editor Scyld Berry described as the worst fixture list since 1919, due to the inconsistent scheduling which sometimes included Twenty20 games the day before or after a four-day County Championship match. Andy Flower, the head coach of the England men's cricket team, concurred, complaining that "You can't create consistently high standards with those schedules."

The tournament split the eighteen county teams into two groups. Within each group every team played each other twice, home and away; the sixteen group-stage fixtures per team were an increase from the ten played the previous season. The top four from each group progressed to the quarter-finals. The competition culminated on "Finals' Day", during which both semi-finals and the final were played, at the same ground, to determine the tournament champions. In 2010 the life insurance company Friends Provident took over as sponsors of the competition, which became known as the Friends Provident t20.

Hampshire County Cricket Club, who played under the moniker "Hampshire Royals" in one-day cricket, had never reached the final of the competition before, although they had won the 2009 Friends Provident Trophy, a 50-over tournament. Despite their historic lack of success in Twenty20 cricket, at the start of the tournament The Guardian described them as being one of the favourites, with odds of 15–2. Somerset, who discarded their one-day nickname in 2009, had previously won the Twenty20 Cup in 2005, and had been losing finalists in 2009. They were similarly rated as among the favourites at the outset of the tournament, given odds of 8–1 by The Guardian.

== Route to Finals' Day ==
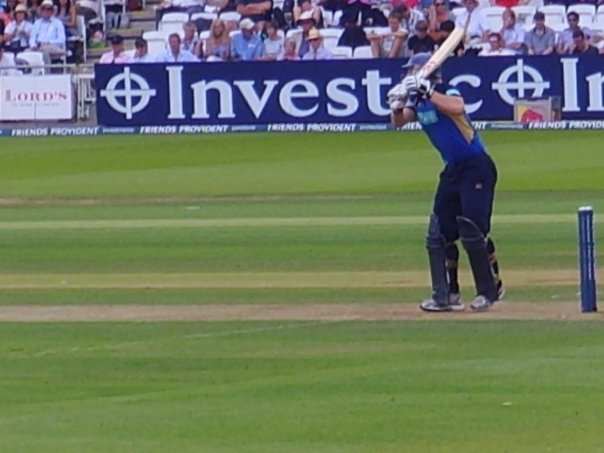
Hampshire's Jimmy Adams was the competition's leading run-scorer.

Both teams featured in the south group of the competition. Somerset won eleven of their sixteen matches to finish top of the group, including victories in both of their matches against Hampshire. In the quarter-final, Somerset hosted Northamptonshire. Somerset's spin bowlers, Murali Kartik and Arul Suppiah both bowled economically to help restrict Northamptonshire to 112 runs. Somerset reached their target with three overs to spare, and secured a place in the competition's showcase Finals' Day.

Hampshire, who had finished fourth in the group stage having won eight and lost eight of their matches, travelled to Warwickshire for their quarter-final. Warwickshire batted first and scored 153; Danny Briggs took three important wickets for Hampshire. In reply, James Vince remained not out, scoring 66 runs to help his side to victory with one ball remaining.

== Build-up ==
Finals' Day was broadcast live on Sky Sports, was hosted at Hampshire's home ground, the Rose Bowl in Southampton. The ground had been chosen in 2008 as the venue for the finals, as part of a package of matches awarded to the ground by the England and Wales Cricket Board.

Hampshire were missing four of their first-team players; Dimitri Mascarenhas, Nic Pothas, Michael Lumb and Kabir Ali, due to injury. They also chose not to include Kevin Pietersen, who had announced his intention to leave the club. Hampshire's chairman, Rod Bransgrove, explained the omission of Pietersen: "it would not be fair on the lads who took Hampshire into the Twenty20 finals if one of them had to step aside so he could be parachuted into the team." Patrick Kidd of The Times rated James Vince as Hampshire's most dangerous batsman, though his team-mate Jimmy Adams entered Finals' Day as the competition's leading run-scorer, with 600 runs. Wisden Cricketers' Almanack's Hugh Chevallier rated them as the weakest of the four teams to reach the semi-finals, and The Times concurred, giving them the joint-longest odds of any finalists; 7–2.

Once the four semi-finalists were known, Somerset were touted as favourites by ESPNcricinfo, who described them as a team "with no clear chink in their armour." The Somerset team featured the competition's two leading wicket-takers, Alfonso Thomas and Kieron Pollard. Kidd highlighted Somerset's strong batting line-up, and listed them as second favourites with odds of 9–4.

=== Semi-finals ===
Hampshire featured in the first of the day's semi-finals; playing against Essex. Having been asked to bat first, Essex scored 156; Briggs once again took three wickets for Hampshire, and Dominic Cork and Abdul Razzaq each bowled very economically. Essex bowled well to leave Hampshire needing 42 runs from the final four overs, but aggressive play from Sean Ervine, Neil McKenzie and Michael Carberry took Hampshire to a six-wicket victory.

Rain delayed the start of the second match, in which Somerset batted first against Nottinghamshire. Attacking batting performances from Marcus Trescothick, who scored a 28-ball 60, and Jos Buttler, who made 55 not out from 23 balls, propelled Somerset to 182 runs from their twenty overs. Further rain in between innings meant that Nottinghamshire required a Duckworth–Lewis adjusted target of 152 runs from 16 overs. Aware that there was more rain around which might further curtail the match, they played attacking cricket, and remained around their required rate throughout the innings, until the wicket of Samit Patel fell at the start of the 13th over. Rain then came in, and the match finished at the end of that over; Somerset won by three runs, using the Duckworth–Lewis method.

== Match ==
=== Summary ===
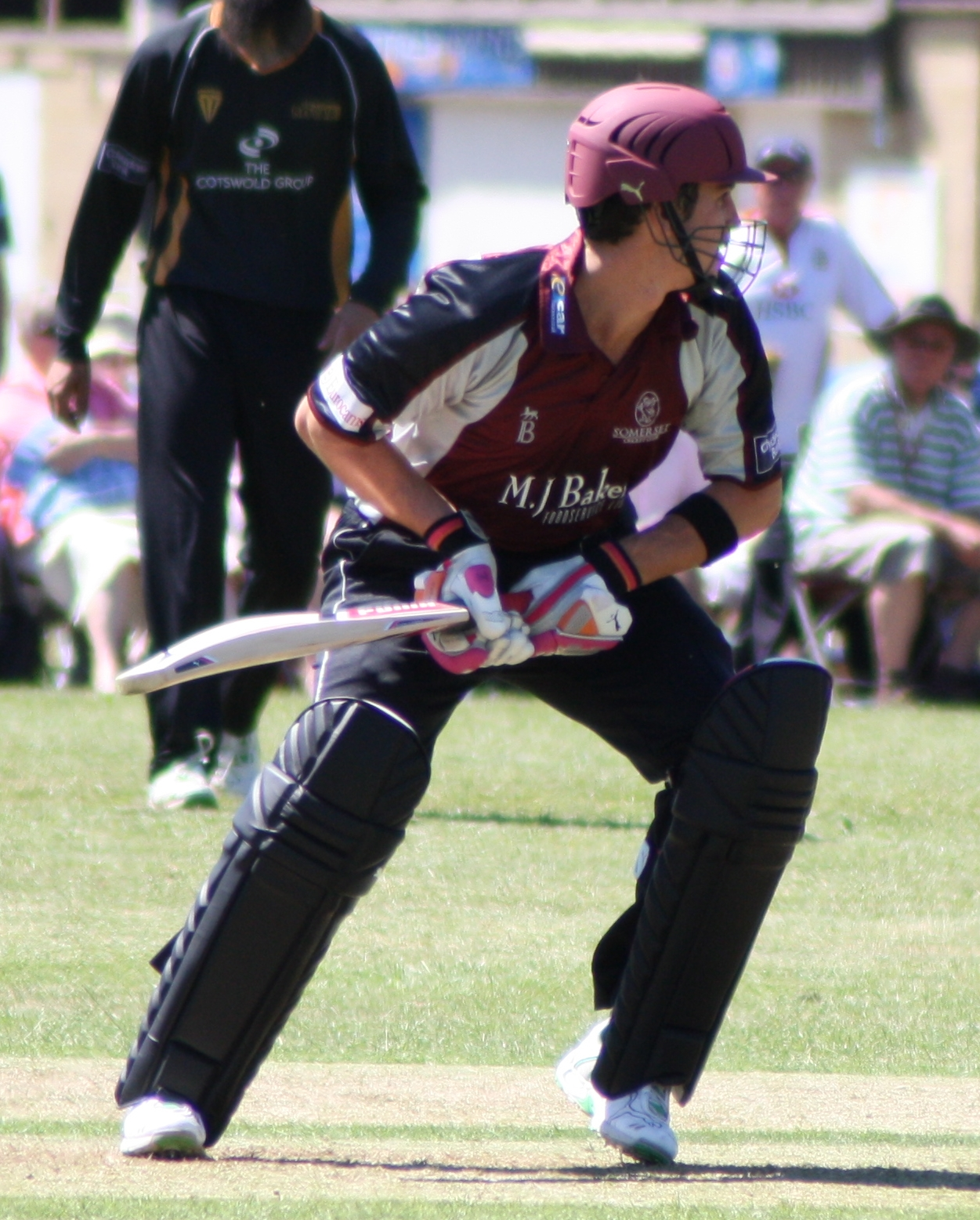
Craig Kieswetter top-scored for Somerset with 71 runs, but was criticised for his slow start.

Played on the same day as both the semi-finals, the match was a day/night game, and started at 7:25 pm. The Somerset captain, Trescothick, won the toss and elected to bat first. The second of the semi-finals had been shortened due to rain, and leading up to the final the ESPNcricinfo commentary described conditions as "murky". After three overs Kieswetter had faced 16 of the 19 deliveries, (Note: The 19 deliveries consisted of 18 "legal" balls and 1 no ball.) and scored 12 runs. He was criticised in the press; ESPNcricinfo's Andrew McGlashan said that he had a "stodgy start", while in The Daily Telegraph, Berry said that Kieswetter's "poor form since the World Twenty20 continued". Despite not facing many deliveries initially, Kieswetter's opening partner, Trescothick, scored quickly from those he did face, making 19 runs from 8 deliveries. He struck two boundary sixes, the first of which, a hard front-foot shot over deep cover, was described as the shot of the day by ESPNcricinfo's James Aitcheson. He was dismissed in the fifth over, mishitting a long hop from Abdul Razzaq to Daniel Christian fielding at midwicket. Peter Trego joined Kieswetter at the wicket, but the pair initially struggled on the damp ground, particularly against Hampshire's young left-arm spin bowler, Briggs, whose performance was praised by both McGlashan and David Lloyd, a former cricketer writing for The Independent. Trego added 33 runs from 24 balls, Somerset's second highest score of the innings, before being caught in the outfield in the twelfth over, leaving Somerset on 97 for two.

After Trego's dismissal, Kieswetter began scoring more quickly, hitting 3 fours and 2 sixes before both himself and James Hildreth were dismissed in quick succession. Hildreth, who had scored 12 runs, hit a full toss from Razzaq to Christian fielding at gully, and then four balls later, Kieswetter sliced a delivery from Christian to extra cover, where it was caught by Carberry. Kieswetter had scored 71 from 59 balls, after taking 37 deliveries to score his first 29 runs; writing in The Guardian, Vic Marks said that the performance "did not really signal a return to form", as he "willed himself to a significant score, seldom timing the ball". The dismissals moved the Somerset score to 149 for four, and brought two new batsmen to the crease, Pollard and Buttler. Pollard struck a four and two consecutive sixes during the penultimate over, before Cork took the wicket of Buttler in the next over. With three balls of the innings remaining, Pollard was surprised by a bouncer from Cork which got in through the gap in his helmet grille and struck him in the face. Pollard's eye was swollen shut, and he had to retire injured from the match and be taken to hospital. Cork, who was shaken by the incident, dismissed Suppiah with the penultimate ball of the innings, and then prevented any runs from the final ball. He conceded three runs from the final over, restricting Somerset to a score of 173 for six. Lloyd described Somerset's score as a little above par, and suggested that Hampshire would need a "flying start to their pursuit".

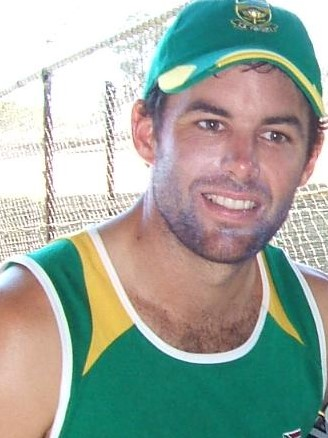
Hampshire's Neil McKenzie was named man-of-the-match.

Jimmy Adams and Razzaq opened the batting for Hampshire, and scored quickly to start the innings. Their total of 62 for one at the end of the six-over powerplay was their second-highest of the competition. The majority of the runs came from two overs; Zander de Bruyn bowled the fourth over, and conceded 16 runs, while Ben Phillips allowed 17 from the subsequent over. The Guardian's Paul Coupar questioned the use of a part-time medium-pace bowler, de Bruyn, during the powerplay – he had not bowled during the semi-final, and was only doing so due to the injury to Pollard. Razzaq was dismissed with two balls of the powerplay remaining, when he was caught behind by Kieswetter, having got a top edge to a delivery from Trego. At the start of the next over, Vince was run out without scoring, and Hampshire were 62 for two. Adams and the new batsman, McKenzie, added 22 runs in the next three overs, before Adams got an inside edge to a delivery from Suppiah, and was bowled. With the score on 84 for three, Ervine joined McKenzie at the crease, and the pair played what McGlashan described as "smart, risk-free batting"; they shared a partnership of 79, moving the score onto 163. At the start of the penultimate over, Hampshire needed eleven runs to win. McKenzie mishit the first ball of the over and was caught at cover for 52, and the next ball Ervine was dropped by Somerset's substitute fielder, Nick Compton. The new batsman, Carberry, was caught behind off a top edge, leaving Hampshire 164 for five, needing to score eight runs from the final over.

De Bruyn returned to bowl the last over; from the first four balls, the Hampshire batsmen scored two byes and two runs, only managing to hit the ball once. Kieswetter twice threw at the stumps, aiming to run the batsmen out, but missed both times. Hampshire needed four to win from the final two deliveries, but by virtue of losing fewer wickets, they would also claim the title in the event of a tied match, so three runs would suffice. From the penultimate delivery, Christian hit the ball to deep mid-wicket for two runs, but while running he pulled his hamstring. Christian was on strike for the final delivery, and another Hampshire player had come out to run for him. Christian missed the ball, which struck his pads. Somerset appealed for leg before wicket (lbw), and the Hampshire batsmen ran a single. In the confusion and excitement, Christian himself ran, as well as his runner, meaning that he could have been run out. However, Somerset were distracted with their appeal, and did not notice. After consultation, the umpires confirmed that it was not lbw, and the match was tied; Hampshire won the title by virtue of losing fewer wickets.

=== Scorecard ===
- Toss: Somerset won the toss and elected to bat first
- Result: Hampshire won by losing fewer wickets

Somerset batting innings
Batsman	Method of dismissal	Runs	Balls	4s	6s	SR
Marcus Trescothick *	c Daniel Christian b Abdul Razzaq	19	8	0	2	237.50
Craig Kieswetter †	c Michael Carberry b Daniel Christian	71	59	6	2	120.33
Peter Trego	c Sean Ervine b Danny Briggs	33	24	3	1	137.50
James Hildreth	c Daniel Christian b Abdul Razzaq	12	14	0	0	85.71
Jos Buttler	c James Vince b Dominic Cork	5	7	0	0	71.42
Kieron Pollard	retired hurt (not out)	22	7	1	2	314.28
Zander de Bruyn	not out	0	0	0	0	–
Arul Suppiah	c Michael Bates † b Dominic Cork	0	1	0	0	0.00
Ben Phillips	not out	0	1	0	0	0.00
Extras	(1 leg bye, 8 wides, 2 no balls)	11				
Totals	(20.0 overs)	173/6	8.65 runs per over			
Did not bat: Alfonso Thomas, Murali Kartik

Hampshire bowling
Bowler	Overs	Maidens	Runs	Wickets	Economy
Dominic Cork	4	0	24	2	6.00
Chris Wood	4	0	51	0	12.75
Abdul Razzaq	4	0	37	2	9.25
Daniel Christian	4	0	30	1	7.50
Danny Briggs	4	0	30	1	7.50

Hampshire batting innings
Batsman	Method of dismissal	Runs	Balls	4s	6s	SR
James Adams	b Arul Suppiah	34	24	3	1	141.66
Abdul Razzaq	c Craig Kieswetter † b Peter Trego	33	19	6	1	173.68
James Vince	run out	0	1	0	0	0.00
Neil McKenzie	c Marcus Trescothick b Ben Phillips	52	39	3	1	133.33
Sean Ervine	not out	44	31	7	0	141.93
Michael Carberry	c Craig Kieswetter † b Ben Phillips	0	2	0	0	0.00
Daniel Christian	not out	3	4	0	0	75.00
Extras	(2 byes, 4 leg byes, 1 wide)	7				
Totals	(20.0 overs)	173/5	8.65 runs per over			
Did not bat: Dominic Cork *, Chris Wood, Michael Bates †, Danny Briggs

Somerset bowling
Bowler	Overs	Maidens	Runs	Wickets	Economy
Alfonso Thomas	4	0	23	0	5.75
Ben Phillips	4	0	44	2	11.00
Zander de Bruyn	3	0	29	0	9.66
Peter Trego	4	0	38	1	9.50
Murali Kartik	4	0	27	0	6.75
Arul Suppiah	1	0	6	1	6.00

Umpires:

- Rob Bailey and Richard Illingworth

Key

- * – Captain
- † – Wicket-keeper
- c Fielder – Indicates that the batsman was dismissed by a catch by the named fielder
- b Bowler – Indicates which bowler gains credit for the dismissal

== Aftermath ==
Writing for The Daily Telegraph, Scyld Berry and Oliver Brown suggested that it was unlikely that the players were aware that Christian could have been run out, saying that "most professional cricketers are most unprofessional when it comes to knowledge of the laws." Chevallier's report in Wisden Cricketers' Almanack went a step further, blaming "Somerset's glaring ignorance of the laws". Asked about the incident post-match, the Somerset captain Trescothick said that they "clearly just did not think at the end there". In his autobiography, Brian Rose, who was Somerset's Director of Cricket, admitted that very few of the Somerset staff and players were aware of that particular law.

The Times's Simon Wilde described the loss of Pollard to injury during the match as a major setback for Somerset, particularly as his two replacements performed poorly: as substitute fielder, Compton dropped a catch, while de Bruyn conceded 29 runs from three overs. Speaking after the match, Cork described the victory as vindication for Hampshire's selection policy, saying "We've been slaughtered throughout this campaign in some circles: why weren't we playing this person?", but he praised the blend of youth and experience for building a team "that can play against the best and beat them".

Hampshire were awarded £200,000 for winning the competition, while Somerset collected £84,000. As man of the match in the final, McKenzie received £2,000. In the 2011 Twenty20 Cup, Hampshire and Somerset met at the semi-final stage; the scores were level based on Duckworth–Lewis, and Somerset won the resulting super over. They subsequently lost the final to Leicestershire; making them runners-up in the competition three years in a row. Somerset also finished as runners-up in the 2010 and 2011 one-day cup competitions. In 2012, Hampshire won both the Twenty20 and the one-day cup competitions.
