= 2005 Twenty20 Cup final =

2005 Twenty20 Cup Final
- Event: 2005 Twenty20 Cup
Lancashire Lightning	Somerset Sabres
114/8	118/3
16	14.1
- Somerset won by 7 wickets
- Date: 30 July 2005
- Venue: The Oval, London
- Man of the match: Graeme Smith
- Umpires: Ian Gould and Peter Willey

The 2005 Twenty20 Cup Final was a cricket match between Somerset County Cricket Club and Lancashire County Cricket Club played on 30 July 2005 at The Oval in London. It was the third final of the Twenty20 Cup, which was the first domestic Twenty20 competition between first-class teams. It was the first occasion on which either team had reached the final; Lancashire had reached the semi-finals in 2004, but for Somerset it was the first time they had progressed further than the group stage of the competition.

After winning the toss, Lancashire captain Mark Chilton opted to bat first. Before the start of play, the game had been reduced to 16 overs-a-side. Lancashire scored 114 runs in their batting overs, but lost regular wickets. Their innings was held together by Australian batsman Stuart Law, who top-scored for the county, accruing 59 runs. In their response, Somerset only lost three wickets, and during an innings dominated by the batting of Graeme Smith, reached their winning target with 11 balls remaining.

== Match ==
=== Summary ===
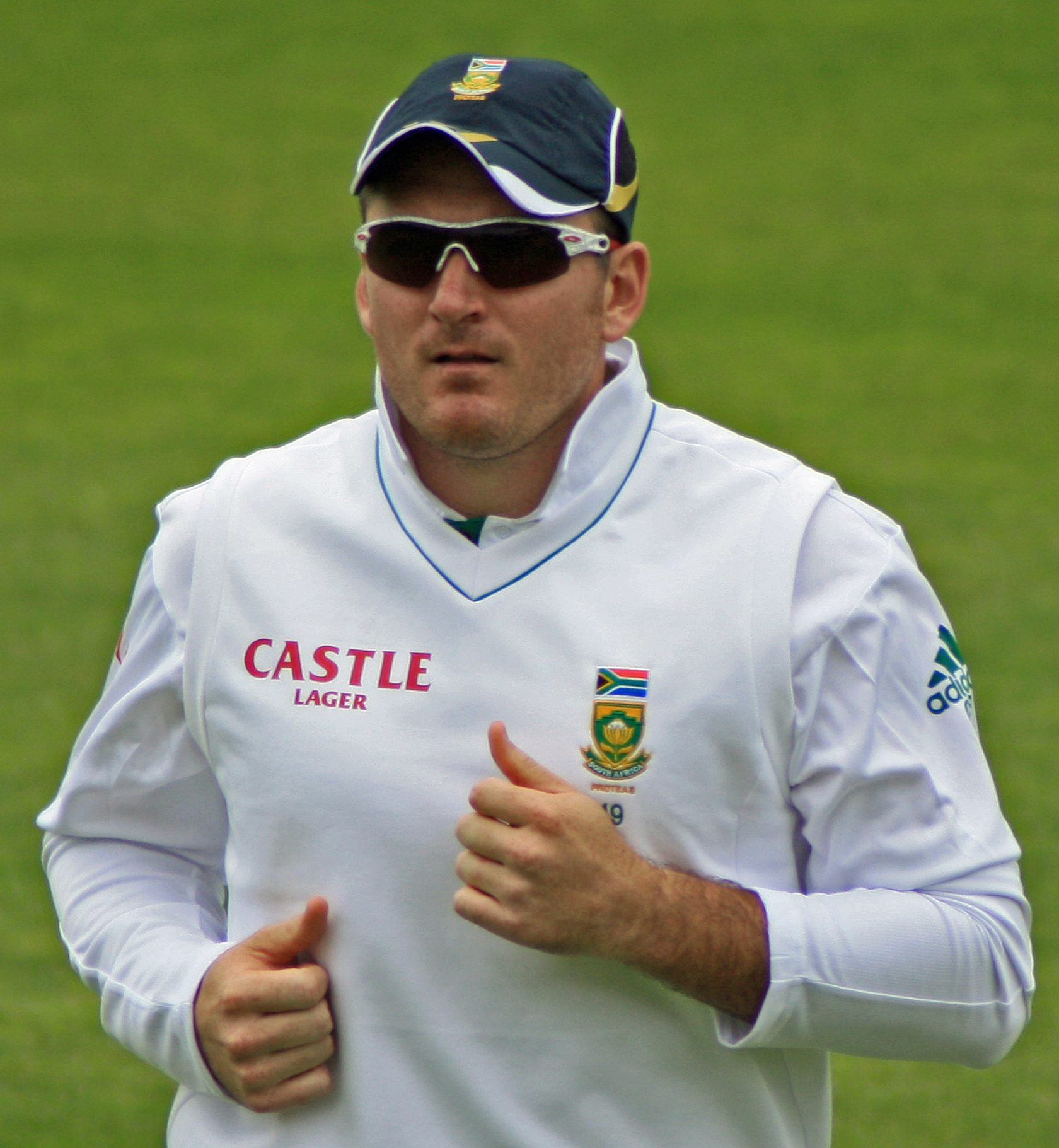
Graeme Smith earned the man of the match accolade, top-scoring with 64 runs for Somerset

Rain delayed the start of the match by an hour, and shortened it to a 16 over-per-side contest. Lancashire captain Mark Chilton opted to bat first having won the toss, but the rain made conditions difficult for the Lancashire openers. In the first over, Mal Loye was dropped by Richard Johnson off the bowling of Andy Caddick, before four balls later being caught by the same combination. Caddick collected his second wicket in his next over, having the England international Andrew Flintoff caught by Ian Blackwell. Andrew Symonds began to bring Lancashire back into the match, but he was run out by a direct hit from Wes Durston for 12. Johnson then claimed two wickets in two balls to get rid of Dominic Cork and Glen Chapple, placing Somerset into what Jenny Thompson of ESPNcricinfo described as "a dominant position" over Lancashire, who were 41 for 5. Stuart Law gave his team a chance, playing a sensibly paced innings to score 59 runs, but the wickets of Chapple, for 9, and Andrew Crook, for 15, both fell before Law himself was run out from the last ball of the innings.

In their response, Somerset batted sensibly, knowing what they had to chase. Flintoff bowled aggressively, and claimed the early wickets of Marcus Trescothick, caught by the wicket-keeper for 10, and Matthew Wood, bowled for 22. Blackwell was out shortly after, caught by Law off the bowling of Gary Keedy, but at the other end, Smith remained steady. Wood had given the innings a boost by scoring four consecutive boundaries before his dismissal, and that allowed Smith and James Hildreth to bat patiently, although Smith's boundary-scoring drew comparisons to Viv Richards and Ian Botham. Smith and Hildreth built an unbeaten 53-run partnership, and won the match with eleven balls to spare. Smith was named man of the match for his captaincy and his score of 64 not out.

=== Scorecard ===
Lancashire County Cricket Club batting innings
Batsman	Method of dismissal	Runs	Balls	Strike rate
Mal Loye	c Johnson b Caddick	5	5	100.00
Stuart Law	run out † Gazzard	59	45	131.11
Andrew Flintoff	c Blackwell b Caddick	2	3	66.66
Andrew Symonds	run out Durston	12	7	171.42
Dominic Cork	c Trescothick b Johnson	1	3	33.33
Glen Chapple	b Johnson	0	1	0.00
Mark Chilton *	b Blackwell	9	12	75.00
Andrew Crook	c † Gazzard b Johnson	15	15	100.00
Warren Hegg †	not out	6	5	120.00
James Anderson	did not bat	–	–	–
Gary Keedy	did not bat	–	–	–
Extras	(2 leg byes, 3 wides)	5		
Totals	(16 overs)	114/8		

Somerset County Cricket Club bowling
Bowler	Overs	Maidens	Runs	Wickets	Economy
Andy Caddick	4	0	21	2	5.25
Charl Langeveldt	3	0	28	0	9.33
Richard Johnson	3	0	26	3	8.66
Keith Parsons	3	0	13	0	4.33
Ian Blackwell	3	0	24	1	8.00

Somerset County Cricket Club batting innings
Batsman	Method of dismissal	Runs	Balls	Strike rate
Graeme Smith *	not out	64	47	136.17
Marcus Trescothick	c † Hegg b Flintoff	10	8	125.00
Matt Wood	b Flintoff	22	13	169.23
Ian Blackwell	c Law b Keedy	3	3	100.00
James Hildreth	not out	16	14	114.28
Carl Gazzard †	did not bat	–	–	–
Keith Parsons	did not bat	–	–	–
Richard Johnson	did not bat	–	–	–
Wes Durston	did not bat	–	–	–
Andy Caddick	did not bat	–	–	–
Charl Langeveldt	did not bat	–	–	–
Extras	(1 leg bye, 2 wides)	3		
Totals	(14.1 overs)	118/3		

Lancashire County Cricket Club bowling
Bowler	Overs	Maidens	Runs	Wickets	Economy
Dominic Cork	2	0	12	0	6.00
James Anderson	1.1	0	14	0	12.00
Andrew Flintoff	4	0	33	2	8.25
Glen Chapple	2	0	23	0	11.50
Gary Keedy	3	0	21	1	7.00
Andrew Symonds	2	0	14	0	7.00

Key

- * – Captain
- † – Wicket-keeper
- c Fielder – Indicates that the batsman was dismissed by a catch by the named fielder
- b Bowler – Indicates which bowler gains credit for the dismissal
