= Inside Edge =

Inside Edge may refer to:

- Inside edge (cricket), batting term in cricket
- Inside Edge (TV series), an Indian cricket web television series
- INside Edge, a website and business publication run by Gerry Dick
- Inside Edge (magazine), a gambling magazine launched by Dennis Publishing before Poker Player
