= 2002 Benson & Hedges Cup =

- Administrator: England and Wales Cricket Board
- Cricket format: Limited overs cricket (50 overs per innings)
- Champions: Warwickshire (2nd title)
- Participants: 18
- Matches: 52
- Most runs: 329 Richard Montgomerie (Sussex)
- Most wickets: 20 Ronnie Irani (Essex)

The 2002 Benson & Hedges Cup was the final edition of cricket's Benson & Hedges Cup. The competition was won by Warwickshire County Cricket Club. The competition which had been inaugurated in 1972 was scrapped following the government ban on tobacco company sponsorship. The replacement competition the following season would be the new Twenty20 Cup.

== Midlands/West/Wales Group ==
Team	Pld	W	L	NR	A	Pts	NRR
Gloucestershire	5	4	1	0	0	8	1.326
Worcestershire	5	4	1	0	0	8	-0.059
Warwickshire	5	3	2	0	0	6	0.006
Northamptonshire	5	3	2	0	0	6	1.512
Glamorgan	5	0	4	0	1	1	-1.737
Somerset	5	0	4	0	1	1	-2.393

== North Group ==
Team	Pld	W	L	NR	A	Pts	NRR
Leicestershire	5	4	0	1	0	9	0.461
Yorkshire	5	3	2	0	0	6	0.45
Lancashire	5	2	2	1	0	5	1.346
Nottinghamshire	5	2	3	0	0	4	-0.709
Durham	5	2	3	0	0	4	-0.536
Derbyshire	5	0	3	2	0	2	-1.461

== South Group ==
Team	Pld	W	L	NR	A	Pts	NRR
Essex	5	4	0	0	1	9	0.485
Sussex	5	4	1	0	0	8	0.616
Kent	5	2	3	0	0	4	-0.483
Hampshire	5	2	3	0	0	4	-0.422
Middlesex	5	1	3	0	1	3	0.369
Surrey	5	1	4	0	0	2	-0.29

=== Quarter-finals ===
21, 22 May 2002
(scorecard)

Gloucestershire; 203/8 (50 overs)	v	Worcestershire; 204/2 (41.4 overs)
Mark Alleyne 52; Kabir Ali 3/39 (10 overs)		Andy Bichel 94*; Mike Smith 1/29 (10 overs)

Worcestershire won by 8 wickets
County Ground, Bristol
Umpires: Nigel Cowley & Jeff Evans
Player of the match: Andy Bichel (Worcestershire)

- The match went into a second day. Gloucestershire were 193/7 (48.4 overs) at the close of the first day.

22 May 2002
(scorecard)

Yorkshire; 237/9 (50 overs)	v	Essex; 239/3 (45 overs)
Darren Lehmann 59; Jonathan Dakin 3/47 (10 overs)		Nasser Hussain 136*; Gary Fellows 1/14 (3 overs)

Essex won by 7 wickets
County Ground, Chelmsford
Umpires: Tony Clarkson & Trevor Jesty
Player of the match: Nasser Hussain (Essex)

22 May 2002
(scorecard)

Leicestershire; 163/8 (50 overs)	v	Lancashire; 164/6 (47.4 overs)
Michael Bevan 67; John Wood 3/33 (10 overs)		David Byas 91; Darren Maddy 2/25 (10 overs)

Lancashire won by 4 wickets
Grace Road, Leicester
Umpires: Mike Harris & Neil Mallender
Player of the match: David Byas (Yorkshire)

22 May 2002
(scorecard)

Sussex; 196/7 (50 overs)	v	Warwickshire; 197/6 (48.4 overs)
Tim Ambrose 87; Dougie Brown 2/27 (10 overs)		Ian Bell 85*; Robin Martin-Jenkins 3/29 (10 overs)

Warwickshire won by 4 wickets
County Ground, Hove
Umpires: Graham Burgess & Nigel Llong
Player of the match: Ian Bell (Warwickshire)

=== Semi-finals ===
6, 7 June 2002
(scorecard)

Essex; 262/9 (50 overs)	v	Worcestershire; 124 all out (33.4 overs)
Ronnie Irani 57; Kabir Ali 4/34 (10 overs)		Steve Rhodes 41; Andrew Clarke 3/13 (3.4 overs)

Essex won by 138 runs
County Ground, Chelmsford
Umpires: David Constant & John Holder
Player of the match: Ronnie Irani (Essex)

- The match went into a second day. Worcestershire were 26/4 (12 overs) at the close of the first day.

7 June 2002
(scorecard)

Lancashire; 211/9 (50 overs)	v	Warwickshire; 213/9 (50 overs)
Mark Chilton 101; Shaun Pollock 4/27 (10 overs)		Ian Bell 46; Kyle Hogg 2/27 (6 overs)

Warwickshire won by 1 wicket
Old Trafford, Manchester
Umpires: Ken Palmer & George Sharp
Player of the match: Mark Chilton (Lancashire)

=== Final ===
22 June 2002
(scorecard)

Essex; 181/8 (50 overs)	v	Warwickshire; 182/5 (36.2 overs)
Paul Grayson 38*; Dougie Brown 2/32 (10 overs)		Ian Bell 65*; Ronnie Irani 2/40 (10 overs)

Warwickshire won by 5 wickets
Lord's, London
Umpires: Barry Dudleston & John Hampshire
Player of the match: Ian Bell (Warwickshire)

== See also ==
- Benson & Hedges Cup
