= Willie Hogg =

English cricketer

Personal information
- Full name: William Hogg
- Born: 12 July 1955; Ulverston, Lancashire, England
- Batting: Right-handed
- Bowling: Right-arm fast
- Role: Bowler

Domestic team information
- Years: Team
- 1976–1980: Lancashire
- 1981–1983: Warwickshire

Career statistics
Competition	FC	List A
Matches	96	88
Runs scored	394	63
Batting average	6.06	5.25
100s/50s	–/–	–/–
Top score	31	9*
Balls bowled	11,908	4,085
Wickets	222	91
Bowling average	28.99	30.87
5 wickets in innings	6	–
10 wickets in match	1	–
Best bowling	7/84	4/23
Catches/stumpings	19/–	13/–
- Source: CricketArchive, 7 September 2024

William Hogg (born 12 July 1955) is a former cricketer who played first-class and List A cricket for Lancashire between 1976 and 1980 and for Warwickshire between 1981 and 1983. A right-arm fast bowler, he took 222 first-class wickets in 96 appearances and picked up another 91 wickets in 88 List A one-day games. He was born at Ulverston, then in Lancashire.

== Personal life ==
Hogg's wife, Sharon Ramadhin, was the daughter of West Indian cricketer Sonny Ramadhin. Hogg's son, Kyle Hogg, also played for Lancashire.
