= Cover drive (cricket) =

Cricket terminology

The cover drive in cricket is the act of stroking the ball through the covers with well-timed wristwork and conventional movement of the front foot toward the pitch of a delivery aimed at or outside the off stump. The cover drive is considered one of the most graceful shots playable in the sport. Batsmen able to master the cover drive are usually given especially high praise because of the shot's difficulty in execution and its requirement for exquisite timing. When played to perfection, the cover drive comprises a batsman's seemingly effortless wielding of the blade in a downward trajectory through the off side, with the cricket ball gliding through infielders in the covers at pace toward the boundary at deep cover.

Babar Azam cover drive

The stroke has historically been associated with gentlemanly play of the sport, particularly during the Golden Age of Cricket in the nineteenth and early twentieth centuries when England still distinguished between amateurs and professionals. During this era, amateurs, or aristocratic cricketers, some of whom played for the Gentlemen, prided themselves on proper, conventional off-side play, including the front-foot cover drive. Professionals, or working-class cricketers, some of whom played for the Players, were better known for workmanlike shots through the leg side, including flicks around the wicket.

Babar Azam, Ian Bell, Kumar Sangakkara, Sachin Tendulkar, Sourav Ganguly, Virat Kohli, Rahul Dravid, Meg Lanning and Laura Wolvaardt are members of a select group of players who are widely considered as 'masters' of the shot with England’s Walter Hammond widely considered as having the finest cover drive ever.

== See also ==
- Cricket terminology
- Off side
- Fielding (cricket)
- Batting (cricket)
