= Cover (cricket) =

Region of the field in cricket

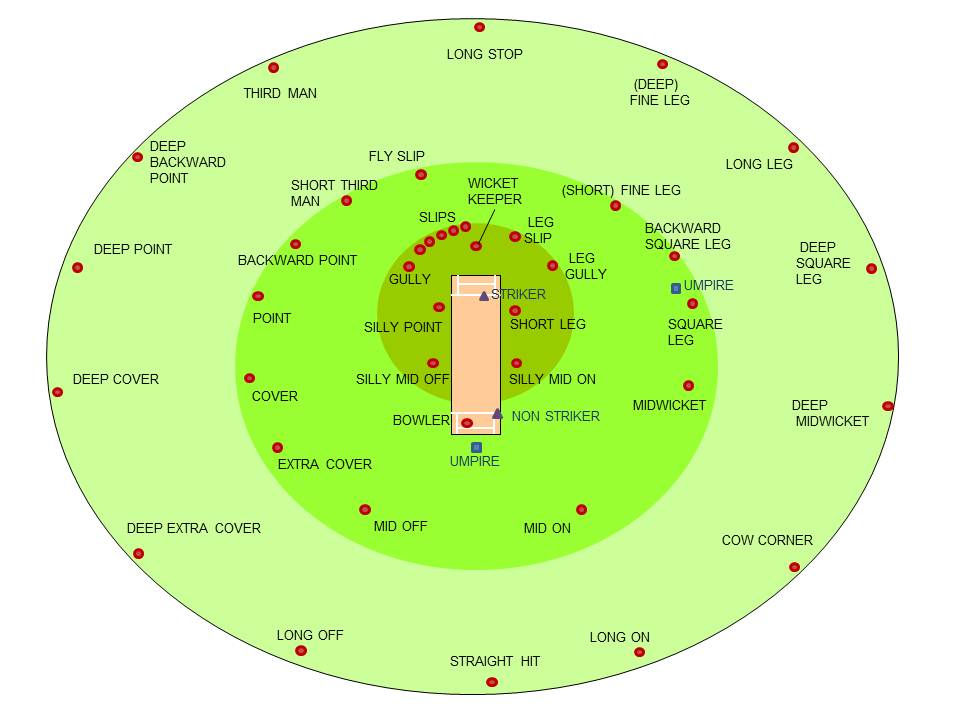

Cover, alternatively the covers, is a region of the field with respect to the batsman in cricket.

The location of the cover region depends on a batsman's handedness, but it is always a part of the field on the off side in front of the batsman, stretching from around slightly forward of square on the off side through an approximately twenty-degree sweep upward across the field. The diagram shows the location of the cover region for a right-handed batsman.

The cover drive is considered one of the most graceful shots playable in the sport.

== See also ==
- Cricket terminology
- Off side
- Fielding (cricket)
- Batting (cricket)
