= Leg side =

In cricket, part of the field of play

The leg side, also called the on side, is a particular half of a cricket field.

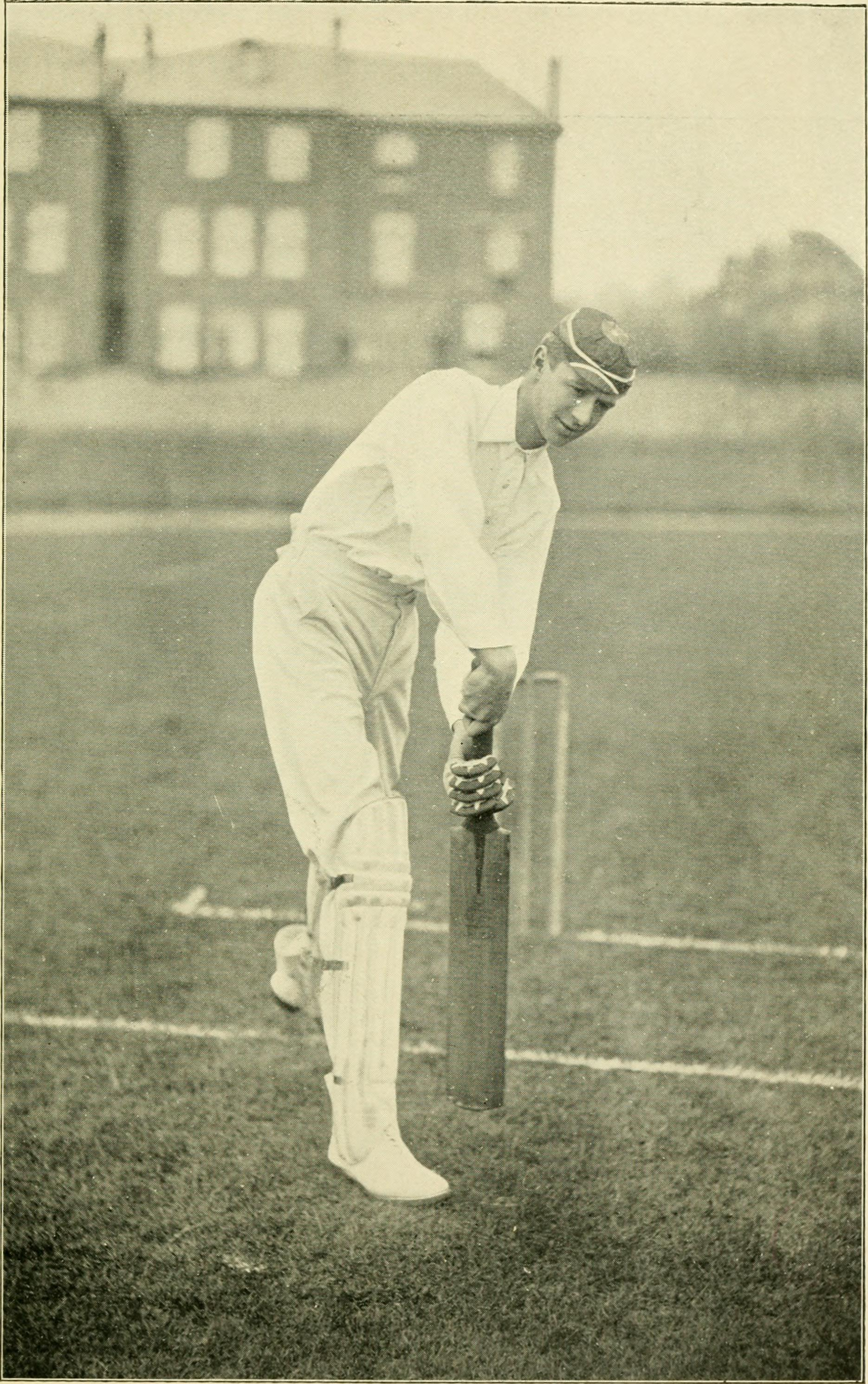
A left-handed batsman. The leg side is on the left side of this picture.

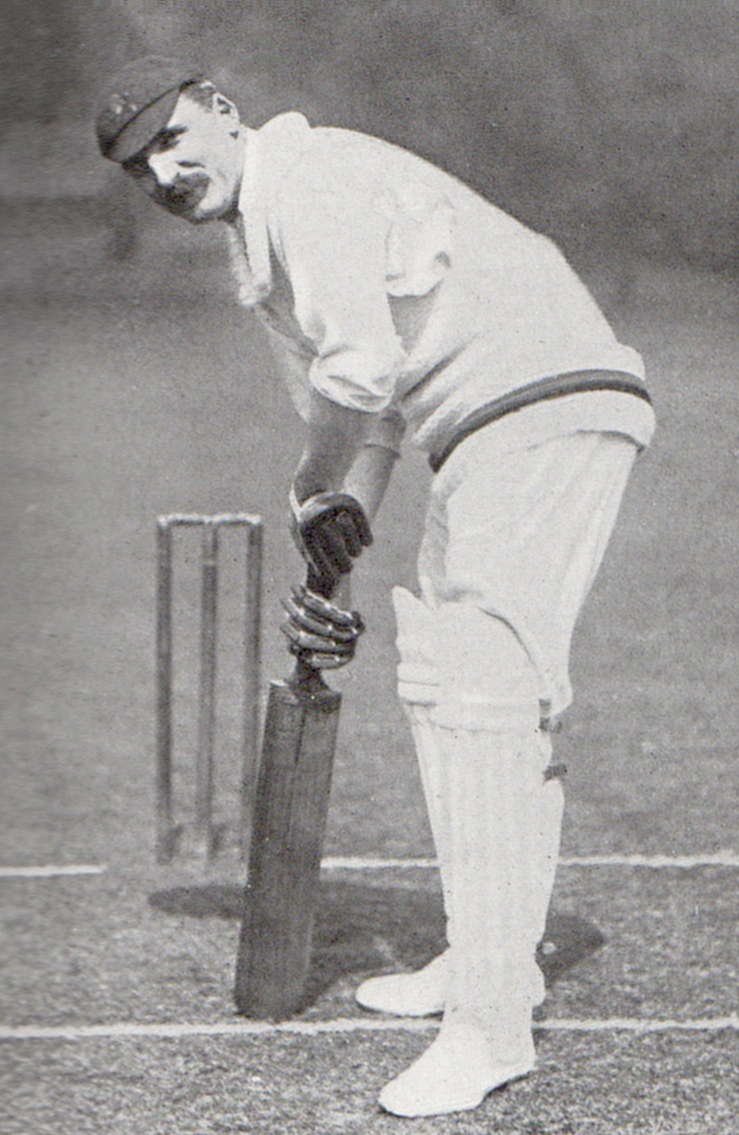
A right-handed batsman. The leg side is on the right side of this picture.

A cricket field may be notionally divided into two halves, by an imaginary line running down the middle of the pitch, through the middle stumps, and out to the boundary in both directions. The leg side is the half of the field behind the on-strike batsman, when the batsman is in normal batting stance. Which half of the field is the leg side therefore depends on whether the on-strike batsman is right-handed or left-handed. The other half of the field, in front of the on-strike batsman, is called the off side.

From the point of view of a right-handed batsman facing the bowler, it can also be thought of as the left-hand side of the cricket field, and from the bowler's perspective, it is the right-hand side. With a left-handed on-strike batsman, the leg side is to their right, and from the bowler's perspective, it is the left-hand side. From the on-strike batsman's perspective, it is therefore the side of the field corresponding to their non-dominant hand.

In the picture, the right-handed batsman, facing the bowler in normal batting stance, has his legs more on the right side of the picture, the leg side. If the bowler bowls the ball down that side of the pitch it will be "on" the batsman's legs, the on side.

== Batting and the leg side ==
Batting shots that send the ball into the leg side include the leg glance, flick, pull, hook, sweep, and on drive.

When the batsman steps backwards from his normal batting stance on the crease as the ball is bowled, he is said to be moving towards the leg side.

== Fielding on the leg side ==
Fielding positions

The leg side is usually less well defended with fewer fielders than the off side, because of the typical line of attack of the bowlers, which is frequently on or outside off stump. This makes it more difficult to hit the ball to the leg side because it involves swinging the bat across the line of the ball, which can lead to mishits and catches.

Several fielding positions on the leg side include 'leg' or 'on' in their name, including square leg, leg slip, leg gully, fine leg, long leg, mid-on and long on.

While the terms "leg side" and "on side" can refer to an entire half of the field, each term is often used to denote only part of this half. When the batsman plays the ball into this half in front of the wicket, it is usually said that the ball has been played to the on side. However, when the ball is played into the region level with or behind the wicket, it is said that the ball has been played to the leg side. The names of fielding positions often include the words "leg" or "on", and they reflect this convention. For example, fine leg is located behind the wicket, whereas mid on is located in front of it.

== See also ==
- Cricket terminology
- Off side
- Fielding (cricket)
