= Iain Sutcliffe =

English cricketer (born 1974)

Personal information
- Full name: Iain John Sutcliffe
- Born: 20 December 1974 (age 51); Leeds, West Yorkshire, England
- Height: 6 ft 2 in (1.88 m)
- Batting: Left-handed
- Bowling: Right arm off break

Domestic team information
- Years: Team
- 1994–1996: Oxford University
- 1995–2002: Leicestershire
- 2003–2008: Lancashire
- 2007: Northamptonshire

Career statistics
Competition	FC	LA	T20
Matches	191	124	4
Runs scored	9,464	3238	4
Batting average	34.16	29.17	1.33
100s/50s	16/51	4/20	0/0
Top score	203	105*	4
Balls bowled	447	–	–
Wickets	9	–	–
Bowling average	36.66	–	–
5 wickets in innings	0	–	–
10 wickets in match	0	–	–
Best bowling	2/21	–	–
Catches/stumpings	110/–	27/–	0/–
- Source: CricInfo, 16 August 2008

Iain John Sutcliffe (born 20 December 1974) is a former English cricketer who played for the cricket teams of Oxford University, Combined Universities, Leicestershire, British Universities and Lancashire. He played as a left-handed batsman, primarily as an opener in four-day cricket, and as a very occasional spin bowler. He also represented Oxford University as a middleweight boxer.

Sutcliffe joined Lancashire in 2003 and in the same season was awarded his county cap. Sutcliffe joined Northamptonshire County Cricket Club on loan towards the end of the 2007 season, only to injure himself during his first game, thus bringing his loan to a premature end.

Towards the end of the 2008 season Sutcliffe announced his retirement from first-class cricket, stating, "I've been presented with some opportunities away from cricket and I'm at a stage where I need to explore these at the earliest opportunity." He would later teach economics and become a housemaster at Wellington College, Berkshire.
