= Off side =

In cricket, part of the field of play

The off side is a particular half of a cricket field.

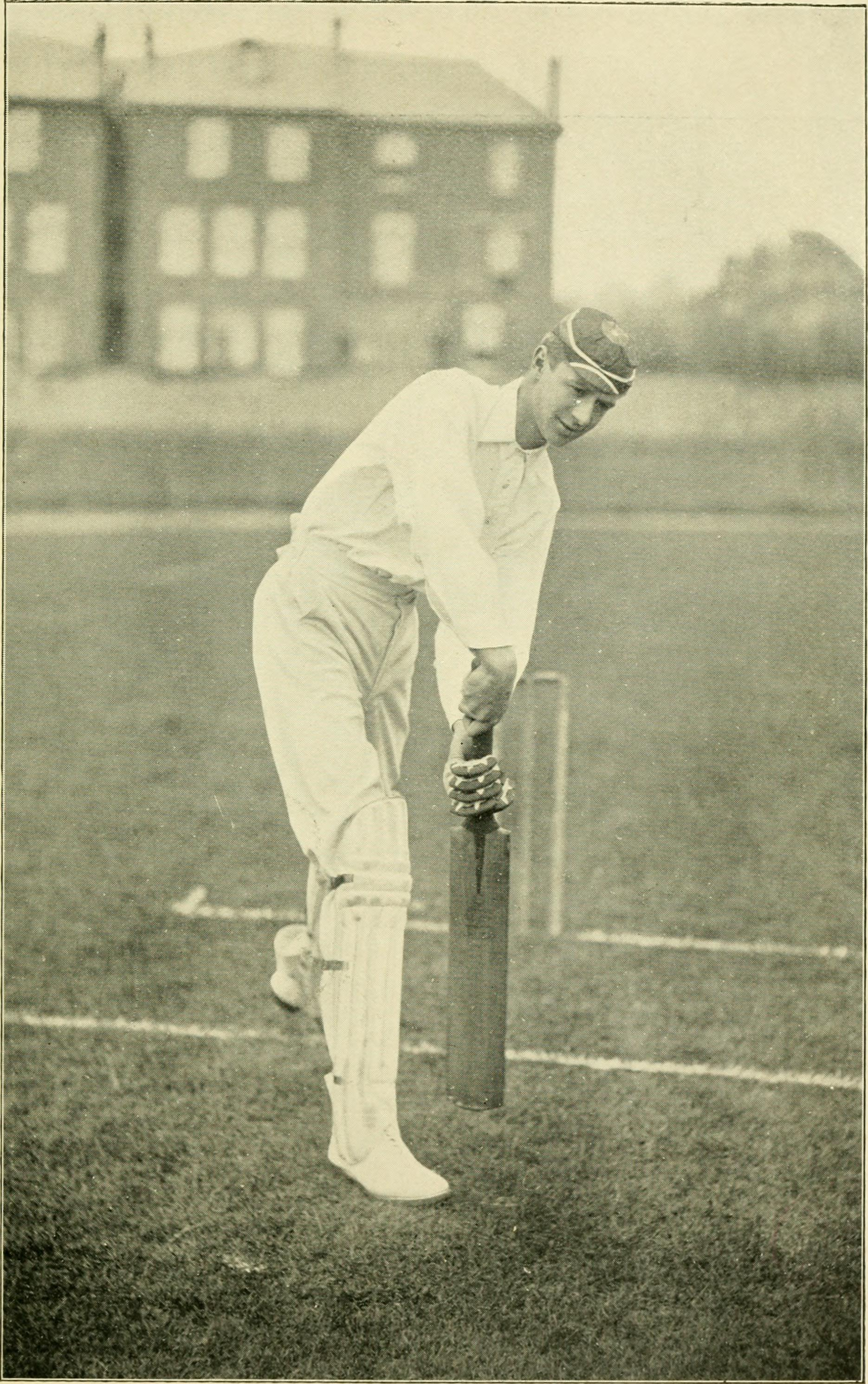
A left-handed batsman. The off side is on the right side of this picture.

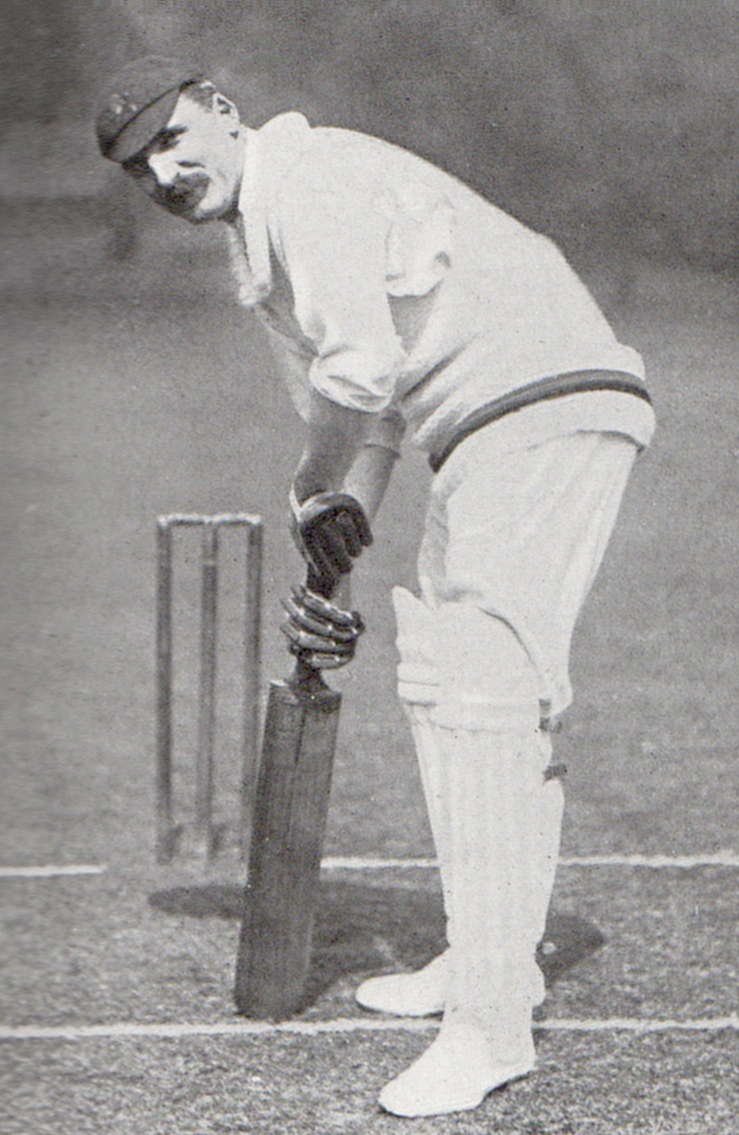
A right-handed batsman. The off side is on the left side of this picture.

A cricket field may be notionally divided into two halves, by an imaginary line running down the middle of the pitch, through the middle stumps, and out to the boundary in both directions. The off side is the half of the field in front of the on-strike batsman, when the batsman is in normal batting stance. Which half of the field is the off side therefore depends on whether the on-strike batsman is right-handed or left-handed. The other half of the field, behind the on-strike batsman, is called the leg side.

From the point of view of a right-handed batsman facing the bowler, it is the right-hand side of the field. The off side consists of the entire half of the field stretching from behind the batsman-end wicket, around third man, square of the wicket on the off side, the covers, and mid/long off, up to the opposite bowler-end wicket and, behind it, the straight field. To the opposing bowler facing a right-hand batsman, it is the left side of the field. The left-handed batsman's off side is to their left and to the opposing bowler's right.

== Fielding on the off side ==
Fielding positions

In the diagram, fielding positions are shown for a right hand bowler approaching over-the-wicket to bowl to a right-handed batsman. Off side field positions in this diagram include the slips, gully, point, cover, mid-off, third man, and long off. Because of the typical line of attack of bowlers, the off side is usually more well-defended with more fielders than the leg side.

== Batting and the off side ==
Some common batting strokes that are played through the off side include straight drive to long off, the cover drive, the square cut, the late cut, and the glance to third man. Batsmen skilled in strokeplay through these regions, particularly square of the wicket and through the covers, often become favorites for fans to watch because of the relative difficulty of mastering such shots. Various batsmen have distinguished their style and success through the off side, including such greats as Sachin Tendulkar, Brian Lara, Garfield Sobers, Kumar Sangakkara, Jacques Kallis, Rohit Sharma, Chris Gayle, Virender Sehwag, and Sourav Ganguly.

== See also ==
- Cricket terminology
- Leg side
- Fielding (cricket)
