= Inside edge (cricket) =

Shot where the ball strikes the inner edge of the bat

The inside edge in the sport of cricket, variously also referred to as the French cut, the Chinese cut, the Surrey cut, or the Harrow drive, is a shot played by the batsman that touches or clips the edge of the bat pointing toward the leg side of the field. This is the side of the bat that is usually closest to the batsman's pads when the batsman assumes a conventional stance facing the bowler. Alternatively, the inside edge can refer to that particular edge of the bat itself.

Inside edges, which frequently result in batsmen playing the ball on to the wicket and being bowled out called "Played On" are typically unintentional on the batsman's part, particularly as it is hard to predict the direction the ball will take upon clipping the inside edge of the bat.

Inside edges often result in the more embarrassingly painful injuries for batsmen, as the ball juts up after hitting the inside edge and hits the batsmen in the inner thigh or groin area.

== See also ==
- Cricket terminology
- Leg side
