= Tim Rees =

English cricketer

Personal information
- Full name: Timothy Martyn Rees
- Born: 4 September 1974 (age 52); Loughborough, Leicestershire, England
- Height: 5 ft 2 in (1.57 m)
- Batting: Right-handed
- Bowling: right-arm off break

Domestic team information
- Years: Team
- 2002–2003: Lancashire
- 2002: Lancashire Cricket Board

Career statistics
Competition	First-class	List A
Matches	1	2
Runs scored	16	7
Batting average	16.00	7.00
100s/50s	–/–	–/–
Top score	16	7*
Balls bowled	–	–
Wickets	–	–
Bowling average	–	–
5 wickets in innings	–	–
10 wickets in match	–	–
Best bowling	–	–
Catches/stumpings	1/–	2/–
- Source: Cricinfo, 10 June 2012

Timothy Martyn Rees (born 4 September 1974) is a former English cricketer. Rees is a right-handed batsman who bowls right-arm off break.

Rees made his debut in county cricket for the Lancashire Cricket Board against Shropshire in the 2002 MCCA Knockout Trophy. In that same season he made a single first-class appearance for Lancashire against Somerset at the County Ground, Taunton, in the County Championship. He batted once in the match, scoring 16 runs in Lancashire's first-innings, before he was dismissed by Matthew Bulbeck. It was in that same season that he also made his List A debut against Middlesex at the Denis Compton Oval in the 2002 Norwich Union National League. He made a second List A appearance the following season against India A at Stanley Park, Blackpool. He thereafter appeared for the Lancashire Second XI, with Rees agreeing a new contract during the 2004 season. However, with opportunities limited at Lancashire, he left the county during the 2005 season.
