= Steven Crook =

Australian cricketer (born 1983)

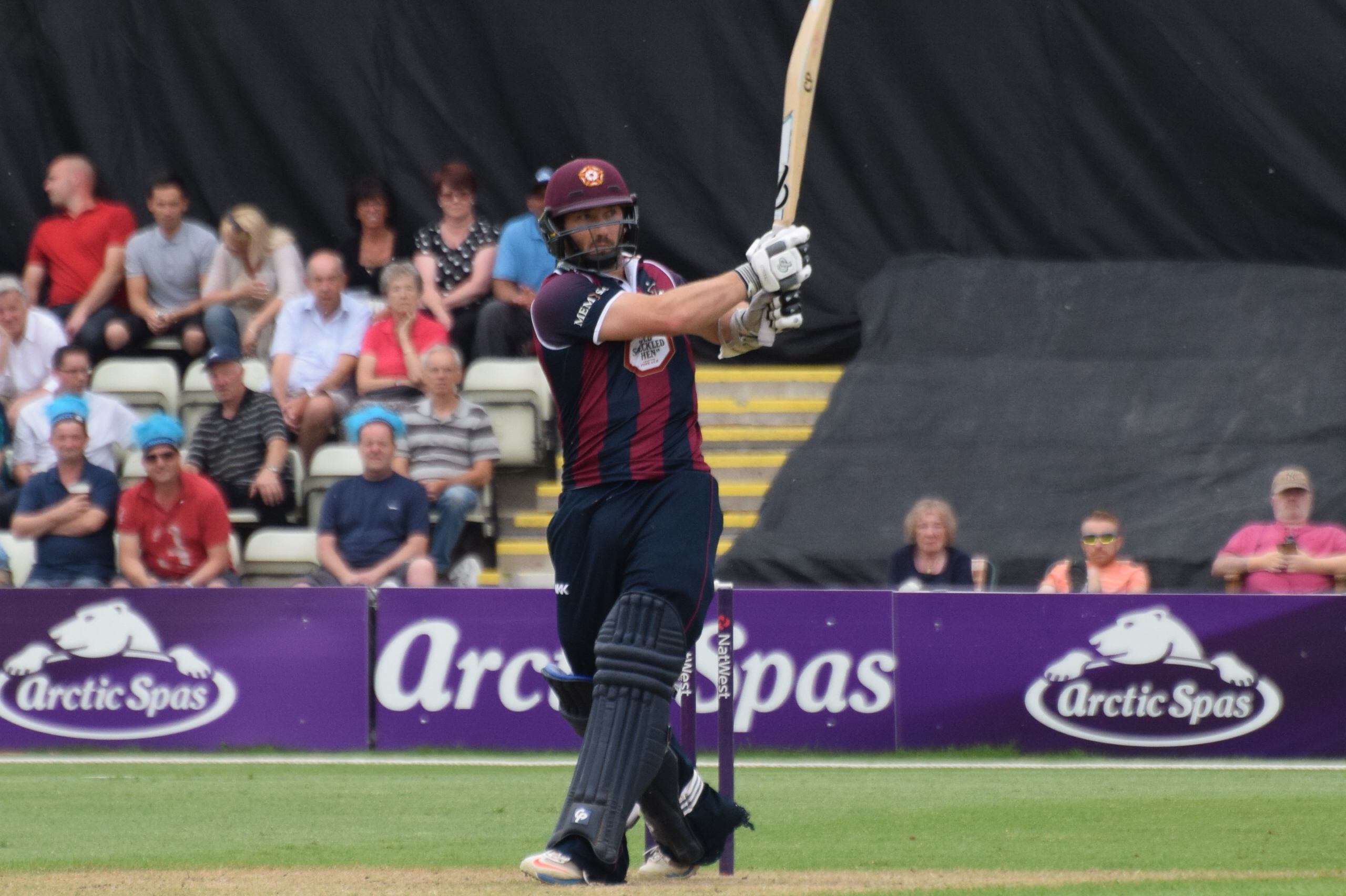

Personal information
- Full name: Steven Paul Crook
- Born: 28 May 1983 (age 43); Adelaide, South Australia
- Nickname: Crooky, Margaret
- Height: 5 ft 11 in (1.80 m)
- Batting: Right-handed
- Bowling: Right-arm fast-medium
- Role: All-rounder
- Relatives: Andrew Crook (brother); Martyn Crook (father)

Domestic team information
- Years: Team
- 2001–2005: Lancashire
- 2005–2009: Northamptonshire
- 2011–2012: Middlesex
- 2013–2018: Northamptonshire

Career statistics
Competition	FC	LA	T20
Matches	107	91	133
Runs scored	4,043	1,244	1,388
Batting average	31.83	21.44	18.50
100s/50s	5/22	1/5	0/3
Top score	145	100	63
Balls bowled	12,492	3,001	1,537
Wickets	207	84	73
Bowling average	39.66	34.36	29.79
5 wickets in innings	3	1	0
10 wickets in match	0	0	0
Best bowling	5/48	5/36	3/19
Catches/stumpings	36/–	18/–	39/–
- Source: CricketArchive, 24 August 2018

Steven Paul Crook (born 28 May 1983) is a former Australian cricketer who played for Northamptonshire in English county cricket. He is an all-rounder, batting right-handed and bowling right-arm fast medium pace. In September 2018, he announced his retirement from all forms of cricket.

== Cricket career ==
Crook was born and brought up in Australia, of British parents. He holds a United Kingdom passport, so is not classified as an overseas player for the purposes of county cricket's overseas player restrictions. While he was playing league cricket in England, he caught the eye of Lancashire and was offered a contract. He made his County Championship debut in September 2003 versus Warwickshire, having previously played a first-class match against university opposition and two limited over county games.

Crook moved to Northamptonshire in 2005, and played for them until 2009. He left Northants in 2009, having been severely limited by injury; in his final season he was only able to play two first-class matches. He spent the 2010 season out of county cricket, playing for Brixworth in the Northamptonshire Cricket League, before signing for Middlesex the following year. He played two seasons for Middlesex, taking 44 wickets at an average of 30.59 in 16 first-class games.

In 2013 he returned to play for Northants. He scored his maiden first-class century in June 2014 against former club Middlesex, and has since scored four more. He has been to Twenty20 finals day three times, twice finishing on the winning team, in 2013 and 2016, and as runners-up in 2015.

== Music career ==
Crook also fronts a band, Juliet the Sun, as lead vocalist. Tabloids told that they provided inspiration for England during the 2005 Ashes and even became brief tabloid darlings when it emerged that former team-mates James Anderson and Monty Panesar were blasting out their signature tune, "Time for Heroes", in the dressing room in between sessions.

Crook plays at the Cricketers Arms. in Northampton.

== Personal life ==
Crook is involved in supporting various charities including a 2015 £1 per run and more benefit for Lennox-Gastaut Syndrome (LGS)-sufferer, Lewis Herbert. Among those assisting have been Jimmy Anderson, Graeme Swann, The Cube Disability and many others. Besides Crook, The Cube sponsors Northants Steelbacks Mohammad Azharullah.
