= Patrick Kidd =

English spourts journalist and blogger

Patrick Kidd is an English journalist, author and blogger specialising in sport generally, and cricket and rowing in particular.

== Education and career ==
Kidd attended Colchester Royal Grammar School and Trinity College, Cambridge, where he read classics. While at Cambridge, he was a member of the P. G. Wodehouse Society and the Horatian Society.

He is currently the diary editor, and was previously a sports writer, for The Times, where he has been working since 2001. He has also written for The Spectator, Wisden Cricketers' Almanack and The Wisden Cricketer. He is also a regular radio and television pundit.

The Times hosted his blog Line and Length, "A very English cricket blog". He also wrote a light-hearted personal blog, The Questing Vole, about politics, history, culture and sport, in which he described himself as "a 1920s eccentric trapped in the body of a 21st-century journalist. Not a very fetching body, either." The blog takes its name from the opening of Scoop, Evelyn Waugh's satire on journalism.

Kidd's first book, Best of Enemies: Whingeing Poms Versus Arrogant Aussies, was released in early 2009. A second book, The Worst of Rugby, was published later that year. He edited an anthology of the first 50 years of the Times Diary. A collection of his parliamentary sketch-writing, The Weak Are A Long Time In Politics, was published in 2019.

== Personal life ==
He is one of three children - with siblings, Tom and Rosie. As a child, his family lived on Mersea Island, off the coast of Essex in a semi-detached villa.

Kidd now lives in Eltham, London with his wife and two children, and serves as a church warden at All Saints, Blackheath, a Church of England parish church in Blackheath in London.

== Published books ==
- The Best of Enemies: Whingeing Poms Versus Arrogant Aussies, Know the Score Books, 2009 (ISBN 1848187033)
- The Worst of Rugby: Violence and Foul Play in a Hooligans' Game Played by Gentlemen, Pitch Publishing Ltd., 2009 (ISBN 1905411421)
- The Times Diary at 50: The Antidote to the News, Times Books, 2016 (ISBN 978-0008205522)
- The Weak Are A Long Time In Politics, Biteback Publishing, 2019 (ISBN 9781785905339)
