= Andrew Crook =

Australian cricketer

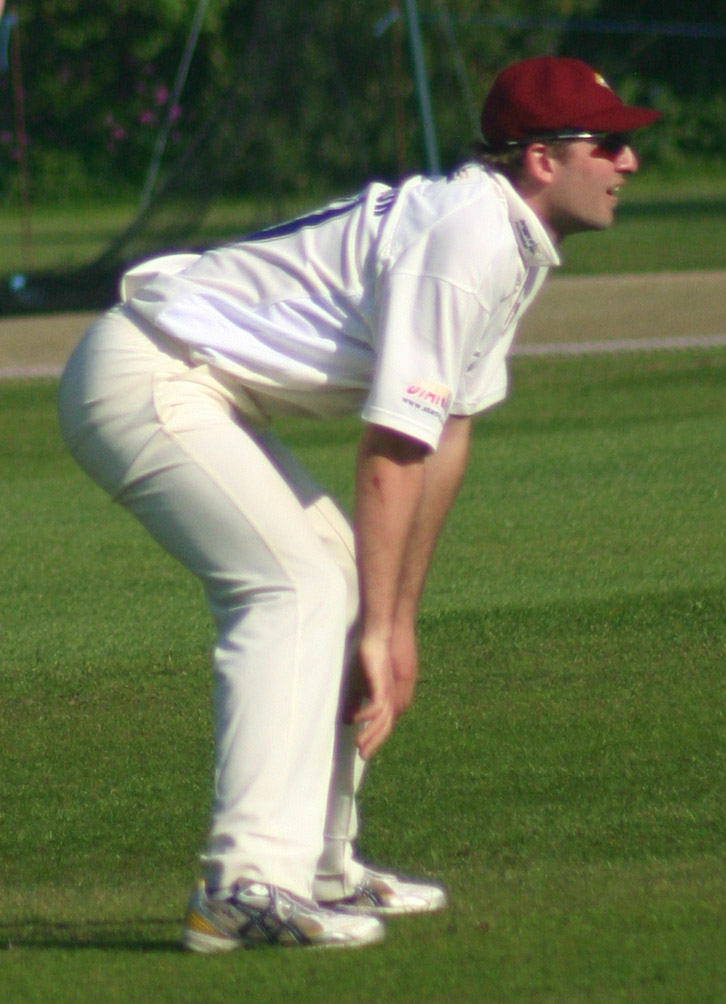

Personal information
- Full name: Andrew Richard Crook
- Born: 14 October 1980 (age 46); Adelaide, South Australia
- Height: 6 ft 4 in (1.93 m)
- Batting: Right-handed
- Bowling: Right-arm off spin
- Role: All-rounder
- Relatives: Steven Crook (brother); Martyn Crook (father)

Career statistics
Competition	FC	LA	T20
Matches	11	21	10
Runs scored	493	444	51
Batting average	30.81	27.75	12.75
100s/50s	0/5	1/0	0/0
Top score	88	162*	15
Balls bowled	896	423	126
Wickets	8	12	7
Bowling average	71.75	34.33	28.71
5 wickets in innings	0	0	0
10 wickets in match	0	0	0
Best bowling	3/71	3/32	2/25
Catches/stumpings	8/–	4/–	3/–
- Source: , 11 February 2011

Andrew Richard Crook (born 14 October 1980) is an Australian cricketer and sports administrator. He played first-class cricket for South Australia, Lancashire and Northamptonshire as an all-rounder, bowling off spin. He is the brother of English county player Steven Crook, who played alongside him at both Lancashire and Northants.

== Cricketing career ==
Crook made his first-class debut for South Australia in November 1998, against a touring England side, taking the wicket of Nasser Hussain. He played no further first team matches for South Australia, but played in England for Lancashire between 2004 and 2006, and during that time set their record One Day score of 162* against Buckinghamshire at Wormsley. He was qualified to play in England as a non-overseas player because he had a British passport, having been born to British parents.

He moved to Northamptonshire for the 2007 season and played six first-class matches for the county.

== Sports administration ==
Crook found opportunities to play for the first team at Northants hard to come by, and began to combine playing with working on the commercial side of the club. He subsequently worked as General Manager of the Netball Superleague in England, before moving to the equivalent job in the ANZ Championship, a netball league covering Australia and New Zealand. He has since become the Chief Operating Officer of the Australian National Basketball League
