= Kyle Hogg =

English cricketer (born 1983)

Personal information
- Full name: Kyle William Hogg
- Born: 2 July 1983 (age 43); Birmingham, West Midlands, England
- Nickname: Boss, Hoggy
- Height: 193 cm (6 ft 4 in)
- Batting: Left-handed
- Bowling: Right-arm fast-medium
- Role: All rounder

Domestic team information
- Years: Team
- 2001–2014: Lancashire
- 2006/07: Otago
- 2007: → Worcestershire (on loan)
- 2007: → Nottinghamshire (on loan)

Career statistics
Competition	FC	LA	T20
Matches	114	140	28
Runs scored	2,708	967	226
Batting average	23.34	15.85	16.14
100s/50s	0/16	0/1	0/0
Top score	88	66*	44
Balls bowled	15,968	5,334	378
Wickets	280	141	16
Bowling average	28.22	30.70	35.25
5 wickets in innings	8	0	0
10 wickets in match	1	0	0
Best bowling	7/27	4/20	2/10
Catches/stumpings	21/–	24/–	5/–
- Source: ESPNcricinfo, 6 November 2014

Kyle William Hogg (born 2 July 1983) is an English former cricketer. He was a left-handed batsman and a right-arm fast-medium bowler who played for Lancashire from 2001 to 2014. Between 2000–01 and 2002 Hogg represented the England under-19s in six youth Tests and 11 One Day Internationals (ODIs). In the 2006–07 season he travelled to New Zealand where he represented Otago as an overseas player. Hogg spent time on loan with Nottinghamshire and Worcestershire, both in 2007.

He was awarded his county caps by Worcestershire and Lancashire in 2007 and 2010 respectively. Hogg took 50 wickets in the 2011 County Championship to help Lancashire to claim the title for the first time since 1950. Hogg subsequently established himself as Lancashire's opening bowler in first-class cricket alongside captain Glen Chapple. A back injury forced Hogg to retire in September 2014 at the age of 31.

== Early life ==
Hogg was born on 2 July 1983 in Birmingham, West Midlands. His family moved to Oldham when he was a child. Hogg is the son of William Hogg and Sharon Ramadhin, daughter of West Indian cricketer Sonny Ramadhin,

== Career ==
Between 2000–01 and 2002 Kyle Hogg played six youth Test matches for England under-19s. He scored 157 runs at an average of 17.44, with a highest score of 50, and took 20 wickets at an average of 26.45 with one five-wicket haul. Between 2001 and 2002 he also played 11 youth ODIs, scoring 295 runs at an average of 36.87 with a highest score of 103 and taking 11 wickets at a cost of 41.28 runs each with best bowling figures of 3 wickets for 41 runs (3/41).

Hogg made his first-class debut on 13 June 2001, representing Lancashire in a match against Durham University Centre of Cricketing Excellence, taking three wickets in the match. The following year in April he played his first match in the County Championship; it was his second first-class match and he took his first five-wicket haul, helping Lancashire to a one-wicket win over Leicestershire. Hogg's relatives include grandfather Sonny Ramadhin and father Willie Hogg. His grandfather Sonny Ramadhin was a right-arm spinner who played 43 test matches for the West Indies & is remembered for his 11 wickets in West Indies first ever Test victory in England at Lord's in 1950. Sonny died on 27 February 2022 at the age of 92. He made a promising start to his career in 2001, at which time there were calls for him to be selected for the full England squad. But in season 2002–03, When team-mate James Anderson was selected by England in the 2002–03 season, some pundits wondered whether the selectors had confused him with Hogg. Instead, Hogg found himself struggling with injuries and illness.

In Hogg's opinion, the 2006 English season was "make or break" for his career. In the one-day team, he constantly opened the bowling and felt he produced consistent performance for the first time in his career. As well as claiming 15 wickets in the County Championship, he also took 16 one-day wickets. He scored 254 first-class runs that season, including two half-centuries. In October 2006, Kyle signed to play in the English close season for New Zealand state team Otago after Warwickshire batsman Jonathan Trott, who usually played for Otago as an overseas player, recommended him. In four first-class matches he scored 170 runs with two half-centuries and a highest score of 71 and took five wickets at an average of 62.60.

In May 2007 Hogg signed a four-month loan deal with Worcestershire to act as cover for injured seam bowlers Roger Sillence and Matt Mason. While playing for Worcestershire, Hogg claimed 3/44, his best bowling figures in the County Championship since 2002. In June injuries to Lancashire's squad meant that Hogg returned to the club before the conclusion of his four-month contract. Hogg played two first-class and four one-day matches for Worcestershire, taking six and two wickets in the respective formats. While playing for Worcestershire, Hogg was also awarded his county cap. Despite injuries, Hogg struggled to secure a place in Lancashire's first team, and in July 2007 moved to Nottinghamshire on loan for a month to bolster their injury-hit squad. Hogg went wicketless in the two first-class matches he played. He took three wickets at an average of 39.66. After two spells on loan, Hogg felt he was not part of Lancashire's plans and considered leaving the club.

Ahead of the 2008 English season, Lancashire toured Dubai as part of pre-season training. Hogg was pleased with his performance on the tour, however a broken bone in his right hand meant he missed the first two weeks of county cricket back in England. In June 2010 Kyle got his best batting figures when he hit 88 in the Roses match against Yorkshire at Old Trafford. Batting at number 10, he helped Lancashire avoid the follow-on and left the ground to a standing ovation from the Old Trafford crowd. In the same match, Hogg took his 100th first-class wicket: that of Adam Lyth who was in the running to become the first batsman to reach 1,000 in the season. At the start of August, Hogg was awarded his county cap. The following month he scored his second first-class half-century of the season, on this occasion 81 against Hampshire. In the same match he took 4 wickets for 53 runs (4/53), his best for the season. In nine first-class matches for Lancashire in 2010, Hogg scored 301 runs (including two half-centuries) at an average of 33.44 and took 20 wickets at average of 32.50.

He missed the start of the 2011 season after sustaining a muscle tear in Lancashire's final pre-season warm-up match. At the start of May Hogg again suffered an injury, this time twisting his ankle in training. When not sidelined with injury, Hogg was competing with Sajid Mahmood, Farveez Maharoof, Oliver Newby, and Tom Smith for a place in the team. His first appearance of the season was on 16 May in Lancashire's CB40 defeat to Somerset in which he conceded 63 runs from six overs, taking a single wicket. Later that month Hogg played his first County Championship game of the season. He recorded his career best bowling figures, taking 7 wickets for 28 runs against Hampshire (surpassed in June 2013 by taking 7 Northants wickets for just 27 runs conceded); it was his second five-wicket haul and first since 2002. Lancashire went on to win the match by ten wickets with Hogg taking career best figures of 11/59 in the match. When Lancashire faced Yorkshire in the County Championship in July, Hogg scored a half-century and took a five-wicket haul to help his team to victory in the Roses match, reaching 150 first-class wickets in the process. Against Nottinghamshire Hogg took his third five-wicket haul of the season in the Championship. The 2011 season was Hogg's most successful: as well as recording his best first-class bowling figures Hogg took 50 wickets in the County Championship for the first time. He also scored 300 first-class runs at an average of 21.47. One of three bowlers to take at least 50 wickets in the County Championship for Lancashire that year, Hogg contributed to the club winning the competition for the first time since it shared the title with Surrey in 1950.

On 5 September 2014 Kyle was forced to announce his retirement from cricket due to a serious back injury. He finished his career with 280 first-class wickets from 114 matches with eight five-wicket hauls and one ten-wicket match return. He also scored 2,708 runs with 16 half-centuries.

After retiring he took a position as a tour manager for SJM Concerts. In 2021, he returned to Lancashire as Girls’ County Age Group Performance Manager. In addition to his role with Lancashire Kyle also linked up with ex teammate Andrew Flintoff to help coach a team of wayward teenagers in the BBC documentary series Freddie Flintoff's Field of Dreams, giving hope to the lives of lads searching for purpose in the Preston region.
