= Mark Chilton =

English cricketer (born 1976)

Personal information
- Full name: Mark James Chilton
- Born: 2 October 1976 (age 50); Sheffield, South Yorkshire, England
- Height: 6 ft 2 in (1.88 m)
- Batting: Right-handed
- Bowling: Right-arm medium
- Role: Batsman

Domestic team information
- Years: Team
- 1997–1998: British Universities
- 1997–2011: Lancashire

Career statistics
Competition	FC	LA	T20
Matches	196	185	52
Runs scored	9,556	4,505	376
Batting average	32.72	30.43	16.34
100s/50s	21/39	5/21	0/0
Top score	131	115	38
Balls bowled	1,343	1,106	–
Wickets	12	42	–
Bowling average	55.58	24.07	–
5 wickets in innings	0	1	–
10 wickets in match	0	0	–
Best bowling	2/3	5/26	–
Catches/stumpings	140/–	57/–	20/–
- Source: Cricinfo, 23 September 2011

Mark James Chilton (born 2 October 1976) is an English first-class cricketer. Chilton was educated at Manchester Grammar School and Durham University where he won the British Universities tournament in 1997. The same year he made his debut for Lancashire, aged 20. Chilton has been compared in batting style to fellow Manchester Grammar School student and former Lancashire and England batsman John Crawley.

Chilton began the 2002 season as one half of Lancashire's first-choice opening partnership with Alec Swann who joined the club in the off-season. For most of the season Chilton struggled for runs in the County Championship, although he was more successful in one-day cricket, scoring two hundreds in the Benson & Hedges Cup. In September 2002, towards the end of the season, Chilton was awarded his county cap by Lancashire. He was appointed Lancashire captain when Warren Hegg resigned in September 2004 after relegation to County Championship Division Two.

[Chilton] was captain for a spell when the team was going through a transitional period and earned the respect of everyone, not least his team-mates.

— Lancashire chief executive Jim Cumbes, 11 August 2010

Chilton must consider the 2005 season, his first as Lancashire skipper, as a minor success after leading the county to promotion in the Championship and to the final of the Twenty20 Cup before losing out to Somerset Sabres at The Oval. Lancashire also progressed to the semi-final of the Benson & Hedges Cup where they lost to Warwickshire. Chilton was close to tears after the match, which was the club's seventh defeat in a semi-final in six years.

The 2007 County Championship was closely contested and going into the final round of matches, Lancashire were at the top of the table. A 24-run defeat to Surrey in their final fixture saw Lancashire finish as runners-up. Chilton was in tears afterwards and said "I'm extremely proud of what our guys have achieved though. As captain I'm privileged to have seen the efforts they have put in. To get close to our target was a phenomenal effort but the lads are just broken. Our players have risen to an almighty challenge and to come so close is an enormous effort". At the end of the season, Chilton resigned as Lancashire captain after three years in the position, citing reasons of form. He had managed 616 runs in the Championship that year at an average of 28.00. Although the team only won one trophy under Chilton's leadership, they came close on numerous occasions, narrowly missing out on two County Championship titles, two Twenty20 cups, and the C&G Trophy. Having relinquished the captaincy, Chilton spent most of the 2008 season in Lancashire's Second XI, struggling for form and trying to force his way back into the First team. In stark contrast, in 2009 he was voted Lancashire's Player of the Year. After retirement, Chilton returned to Manchester Grammar where he took the position of director of cricket.

Chilton was awarded a benefit season for 2011. That year Lancashire won the County Championship for the first time since they shared the title in 1950, and their first outright win since 1934. Chilton contributed 478 runs in 13 Championship matches that season at an average of 22.76. At the end of the 2011 season he announced his retirement from playing cricket.
