= Warren Hegg =

English cricketer (born 1968)

Personal information
- Full name: Warren Kevin Hegg
- Born: 23 February 1968 (age 58); Whitefield, Lancashire, England
- Nickname: Chucky, Chutch, The Admiral
- Height: 5 ft 7 in (1.70 m)
- Batting: Right-handed
- Role: Wicket-keeper

International information
- National side: England
- Test debut (cap 593): 26 December 1998 v Australia
- Last Test: 5 January 1999 v Australia

Domestic team information
- Years: Team
- 1986–2005: Lancashire

Career statistics
Competition	Test	FC	LA	T20
Matches	2	348	409	20
Runs scored	30	11,302	3,313	104
Batting average	7.50	27.90	19.95	11.55
100s/50s	0/0	7/55	0/5	0/0
Top score	15	134	81	45
Catches/stumpings	8/0	857/94	466/61	10/8
- Source: CricketArchive, 19 December 2008

Warren Kevin Hegg (born 23 February 1968) is an English former professional cricketer. He played county cricket for Lancashire. Although primarily a wicket-keeper, Hegg was also a handy lower-order batsman, and made several first-class hundreds. He represented England in two Test matches, however his international career was hampered due to England's selectors choosing Alec Stewart to act as an all-rounder. Hegg represented Lancashire for 19 years, captaining them for three between 2002 and 2004. He retired from competitive cricket in 2005.

== Career ==
=== Lancashire's first choice wicket-keeper ===
Hegg made his first-class debut for Lancashire in 1986, and remained with the county for his entire career. In 1989 he set a Lancashire record when he held 11 catches in a single match first-class match; this feat, achieved against Derbyshire, is the equal fifth most dismissals in a match by a wicket-keeper. One of Hegg's finest moments came on 12 June 1996 when playing for Lancashire against Yorkshire in the semi-final of the Benson & Hedges Cup. Chasing 251 to win, Lancashire were 97/5 when Hegg arrived at the crease. Further wickets tumbled around him but Hegg scored 81 from 62 balls to help steer his county to victory by 1 wicket from the very last ball of the match.

Hegg played two Test matches during the 1998–99 Ashes tour of Australia when Alec Stewart was moved up the order to play as a specialist batsman. Following Stewart's withdrawal from the winter tour of India in 2001, Hegg was recalled to the England squad for that tour and the one of which followed in New Zealand. Hegg never again played international cricket again, and was second choice to the younger wicket-keeper, James Foster, on the tour.

Hegg was appointed captain of his county in 2002. Under his captaincy, Lancashire finished third and second in the County Championship in 2002 and 2003 respectively.

=== Final seasons ===
The 2004 season was an unsuccessful one for Lancashire, with the team being relegated to the second division of the County Championship for the first time in its history, despite having started as the bookmarkers' favourites to win the competition. The squad was severely depleted by injuries, at one point eight bowlers were unavailable, and Hegg himself suffered two hamstring injuries which meant he missed several matches, including the final match of the season which the team needed to win to stay in the first division. Following Lancashire's relegation at the end of 2004, Hegg stepped down as Lancashire captain. He was replaced by batsman Mark Chilton. Hegg said of his time as captain "It has been a great honour but now the time is right to step down and concentrate on helping the team recapture its position in the first division".

On 15 May 2005, Hegg announced that 2005 would be his last year of cricket. Two weeks before the end of the 2005 season, a delivery from fast bowler James Anderson ricocheted off James Middlebrook's stumps, dismissing him, and hit Hegg on the thumb. The freak accident forced Hegg's season to end prematurely, and he finished with a total of 951 first-class dismissals, of which 919 were for Lancashire, just six short of George Duckworth's Lancashire record of 925.
