= 2011 Twenty20 Cup =

2011 Friends Life t20
- Dates: 1 June 2011 – 27 August 2011
- Administrator: England and Wales Cricket Board
- Cricket format: Twenty20
- Tournament format(s): Group stage and knockout
- Champions: Leicestershire Foxes (3rd title)
- Participants: 18
- Matches: 151
- Attendance: 668,937 (4,430 per match)
- Most runs: Andrew McDonald, (Leicestershire Foxes) (584)
- Most wickets: Tim Phillips, (Essex Eagles) (26)
- Official website: CricInfo

The 2011 FriendsLife T20 was the ninth edition of what would later become the T20 Blast, England's premier domestic Twenty20 competition. The tournament ran from 1 June to 27 August 2011. The teams in the tournament remained the same as the previous season.

The ECB opted to retain the enlarged schedule from the previous season, despite criticism that the tournament had become bloated. In a vote, counties, perhaps conscious of financial difficulties incurred during the 2010 season, opted against any kind of reduction.

The final saw Leicestershire Foxes beat Somerset for their third title. Both finalists qualified for the 2011 Champions League Twenty20 qualifying stage.

== Group stage ==
=== North Group ===
==== Table ====
Pos	Team	Pld	W	L	T	NR	Pts	NRR
1	Nottinghamshire Outlaws	16	11	2	0	3	25	1.087
2	Leicestershire Foxes	16	10	2	0	4	24	0.541
3	Lancashire Lightning	16	9	5	1	1	20	0.459
4	Durham Dynamos	16	6	6	0	4	16	0.678
5	Worcestershire Royals	16	6	7	0	3	15	−0.089
6	Yorkshire Carnegie	16	6	7	0	3	15	−0.548
7	Derbyshire Falcons	16	4	8	1	3	12	−0.489
8	Warwickshire Bears	16	4	10	0	2	10	−0.598
9	Northamptonshire Steelbacks	16	2	11	0	3	7	−0.912

Source: Cricinfo

===== June =====
2 June
Scorecard

Durham Dynamos; 151/3 (20 overs)	v	Warwickshire Bears; 155/5 (18.1 overs)
Ian Blackwell 46* (32); Steffan Piolet 2/19 (4 overs)		William Porterfield 83 (53); Gareth Breese 2/24 (4 overs)

Warwickshire won by 5 wickets
Riverside Ground, Chester-le-Street
Umpires: David Millns and Martin Bodenham
Player of the match: William Porterfield (Warks Bears)

- Warwickshire Bears won the toss and elected to field.
- Andrew Miller (Warwickshire Bears) and Chris Rushworth (Durham Dynamos) made their T20 debuts.

2 June (D/N)
Scorecard

Derbyshire Falcons; 190/5 (20 overs)	v	Lancashire Lightning; 190/6 (20 overs)
Wes Durston 86 (58); Tom Smith 2/37 (4 overs)		Stephen Moore 72 (55); Greg Smith 2/36 (3 overs)

Match tied
County Ground, Derby
Umpires: Michael Gough and Trevor Jesty
Player of the match: Wes Durston (Derbyshire Falcons)

- Lancashire Lightning won the toss and elected to field.
- Jordan Clark and Luke Procter (Lancashire Lightning) made their T20 debuts

3 June
Scorecard

Lancashire Lightning; 154/7 (20 overs)	v	Worcestershire Royals; 146/9 (20 overs)
Stephen Moore 28 (20); Moeen Ali 2/24 (4 overs)		Shaaiq Choudhry 26* (16); Gary Keedy 3/14 (4 overs)

Lancashire Lightning won by 8 runs
Old Trafford, Manchester
Umpires: Peter Hartley and Steve Garratt
Player of the match: Gary Keedy (Lancashire Lightning)

- Lancashire Lightning won the toss and elected to bat.
- Aneesh Kapil (Worcestershire Royals) made his T20 debut.

3 June
Scorecard

Yorkshire Carnegie; 161/8 (20 overs)	v	Warwickshire Bears; 164/5 (17.5 overs)
Andrew Gale 54 (25); Darren Maddy 3/10 (2 overs)		William Porterfield 64 (34); Adil Rashid 3/28 (4 overs)

Warwickshire Bears won by 5 wickets
Headingley, Leeds
Umpires: David Millns and Jeremy Lloyds
Player of the match: William Porterfield (Warks Bears)

- Warwickshire Bears won the toss and elected to field.
- Joe Root (Yorkshire Carnegie) made his T20 debut.

3 June
Scorecard

Nottinghamshire Outlaws; 184/6 (20 overs)	v	Derbyshire Falcons; 146/8 (20 overs)
David Hussey 60 (45); Steffan Jones 2/35 (4 overs)		Wes Durston 46 (33); Andy Carter 4/20 (4 overs)

Nottinghamshire Outlaws won by 38 runs
Trent Bridge, Nottingham
Umpires: Nick Cook and Stephen Gale
Player of the match: Andy Carter (Notts Outlaws)

- Derbyshire Falcons won the toss and elected to field.
- Tom Knight (Derbyshire Falcons) made his T20 debut.

3 June (D/N)
Scorecard

Northamptonshire Steelbacks; 135/5 (20 overs)	v	Leicestershire Foxes; 139/4 (19 overs)
Johan Botha 36 (40); Matthew Hoggard 3/21 (4 overs)		Paul Nixon 44 (47); Lee Daggett 1/11 (3 overs)

Leicestershire Foxes won by 6 wickets
County Ground, Northampton
Umpires: George Sharp and Michael Gough
Player of the match: James Taylor (Leics Foxes)

- Northamptonshire Steelbacks won the toss and elected to bat.

5 June
Scorecard

Leicestershire Foxes; 173/2 (20 overs)	v	Lancashire Lightning; 175/5 (18.1 overs)
Josh Cobb 60 (40); Gary Keedy 1/26 (4 overs)		Tom Smith 75 (45); Matthew Hoggard 2/32 (4 overs)

Lancashire Lightning won by 5 wickets
Grace Road, Leicester
Umpires: Nigel Llong and Rob Bailey
Player of the match: Tom Smith (Lancashire Lightning)

- Lancashire Lightning won the toss and elected to field.

5 June
Scorecard

Nottinghamshire Outlaws; 215/6 (20 overs)	v	Yorkshire Carnegie; 162/8 (20 overs)
Adam Voges 74 (46); Anthony McGrath 3/17 (2 overs)		Adam Lyth 43 (27); Samit Patel 2/27 (4 overs)

Nottinghamshire Outlaws won by 53 runs
Trent Bridge, Nottingham
Umpires: Peter Hartley and Steve Garratt
Player of the match: Samit Patel (Notts Outlaws)

- Nottinghamshire Outlaws won the toss and elected to bat.

5 June
Scorecard

Northamptonshire Steelbacks; 150/8 (20 overs)	v	Warwickshire Bears; 110 (17.3 overs)
Alex Wakely 35 (22); Jeetan Patel 3/19 (4 overs)		Tim Ambrose 25 (22); Johan Botha 4/16 (4 overs)

Northamptonshire Steelbacks won by 40 runs
Edgbaston, Birmingham
Umpires: Neil Bainton and Richard Kettleborough
Player of the match: Jack Brooks (Northants Steelbacks)

- Warwickshire Bears won the toss and elected to field.

5 June
Scorecard

Worcestershire Royals	v	Durham Dynamos

Match abandoned
New Road, Worcester
Umpires: Nick Cook and Nigel Cowley

- No toss.
- No play was possible due to rain.

8 June

Nottinghamshire Outlaws; 193/7 (20 overs)	v	Warwickshire Bears; 165 (20 overs)
Riki Wessels 70 (43); Neil Carter 2/61 (4 overs)		Darren Maddy 61 (36); Darren Pattinson 5/25 (4 overs)

Nottinghamshire Outlaws won by 28 runs
Edgbaston, Birmingham
Umpires: John Steele and Rob Bailey
Player of the match: Riki Wessels (Notts Outlaws)

- Nottinghamshire Outlaws won the toss and elected to bat.

8 June
Scorecard

Lancashire Lightning; 162/5 (19 overs)	v	Leicestershire Foxes; 165/6 (18.5 overs)
Stephen Moore 48 (39); Claude Henderson 2/26 (4 overs)		Abdul Razzaq 62* (30); Simon Kerrigan 2/32 (4 overs)

Leicestershire Foxes won by 4 wickets
Old Trafford, Manchester
Umpires: Nick Cook and Richard Kettleborough
Player of the match: Abdul Razzaq (Leics Foxes)

- Leicestershire Foxes won the toss and elected to field.
- Lancashire Lightning innings reduced to 19 overs. Leicestershire Foxes were set a revised target of 165 in 19 overs.

9 June (D/N)
Scorecard

Northamptonshire Steelbacks; 124/9 (20 overs)	v	Durham Dynamos; 127/1 (16.1 overs)
Johan Botha 36 (30); Paul Collingwood 2/15 (4 overs)		Phil Mustard 61* (49); David Willey 1/40 (4 overs)

Durham Dynamos won by 9 wickets
County Ground, Northampton
Umpires: Rob Bailey and Steve O'Shaughnessy
Player of the match: Phil Mustard (Durham Dynamos)

- Durham Dynamos won the toss and elected to field.

9 June (D/N)
Scorecard

Yorkshire Carnegie; 152/7 (20 overs)	v	Worcestershire Royals; 150/7 (20 overs)
Andrew Gale 29 (15); Gareth Andrew 3/30 (4 overs)		Gareth Andrew 60* (26); Rich Pyrah 4/21 (4 overs)

Yorkshire Carnegie won by 2 runs
Headingley, Leeds
Umpires: George Sharp and Tim Robinson
Player of the match: Rich Pyrah (Yorkshire Carnegie)

- Yorkshire Carnegie won the toss and elected to bat.

10 June
Scorecard

Nottinghamshire Outlaws; 164/8 (20 overs)	v	Leicestershire Foxes; 21/0 (2.4 overs)
Adam Voges 36 (24); Abdul Razzaq 2/23 (4 overs)		Andrew McDonald 11* (5)

No result
Grace Road, Leicester
Umpires: Neil Mallender and Rob Bailey

- Leicestershire Foxes won the toss and elected to field.
- No further play was possible due to rain.

10 June
Scorecard

Northamptonshire Steelbacks; 134/9 (20 overs)	v	Worcestershire Royals; 135/3 (18 overs)
Alex Wakely 62 (45); Shakib Al Hasan 3/29 (4 overs)		Moeen Ali 53 (48); Johan Botha 2/27 (4 overs)

Worcestershire Royals won by 7 wickets
New Road, Worcester
Umpires: Neil Bainton and Nigel Llong
Player of the match: Moeen Ali (Worcestershire Royals)

- Worcestershire Royals won the toss and elected to field

10 June
Scorecard

Lancashire Lightning; 122/6 (20 overs)	v	Yorkshire Carnegie; 123/8 (19.4 overs)
Karl Brown 34* (29); Azeem Rafiq 3/15 (4 overs)		Adam Lyth 28 (31); Luke Procter 3/22 (4 overs)

Yorkshire Carnegie won by 2 wickets
Old Trafford, Manchester
Umpires: Peter Hartley and Stephen Gale
Player of the match: Azeem Rafiq (Yorkshire Carnegie)

- Yorkshire Carnegie won the toss and elected to field.
- Karl Brown (Lancashire Lightning) made his T20 debut.

10 June (D/N)
Scorecard

Derbyshire Falcons; 183/3 (20 overs)	v	Durham Dynamos; 178/5 (20 overs)
Martin Guptill 60 (43); Gareth Breese 2/27 (4 overs)		Gordon Muchall 62 (43); Wes Durston 2/26 (3 overs)

Derbyshire Falcons won by 5 runs
County Ground, Derby
Umpires: George Sharp and Steve Garratt
Player of the match: Martin Guptill (Derbyshire Falcons)

- Durham Dynamos won the toss and elected to field.
- Ross Whiteley (Derbyshire Falcons) made his T20 debut.

11 June
Scorecard

Nottinghamshire Outlaws; 173/6 (20 overs)	v	Warwickshire Bears; 163/7 (20 overs)
Alex Hales 67 (40); Steffan Piolet 2/28 (4 overs)		Chris Woakes 44* (19); Steven Mullaney 2/28 (4 overs)

Nottinghamshire Outlaws won by 10 runs
Trent Bridge, Nottingham
Umpires: Nigel Llong and Tim Robinson
Player of the match: Alex Hales (Notts Outlaws)

- Nottinghamshire Outlaws won the toss and elected to bat.

12 June
Scorecard

Yorkshire Carnegie	v	Northamptonshire Steelbacks

Match abandoned
Headingley, Leeds
Umpires: Neil Bainton and Neil Mallender

- No toss
- No play possible due to rain.

12 June
Scorecard

Leicestershire Foxes	v	Warwickshire Bears

Match abandoned
Grace Road, Leicester
Umpires: Nigel Llong and Steve Garratt

- No toss
- No play was possible due to rain.

12 June
Scorecard

Worcestershire Royals	v	Lancashire Lightning

Match abandoned
New Road, Worcester
Umpires: David Millns and Jeff Evans

- No toss
- No play possible due to rain.

12 June
Scorecard

Derbyshire Falcons; 169/5 (20 overs)	v	Durham Dynamos
Wayne Madsen 54 (27); Paul Collingwood 2/24 (3 overs)

No result
Riverside Ground, Chester-le-Street
Umpires: Peter Hartley and Richard Kettleborough

- Durham Dynamos won the toss and elected to field.
- No further play was possible due to rain.

14 June
Scorecard

Durham Dynamos; 187/8 (20 overs)	v	Nottinghamshire Outlaws; 154/8 (20 overs)
Phil Mustard 75 (41); Darren Pattinson 3/31 (4 overs)		Adam Voges 46 (26); Chris Rushworth 3/20 (4 overs)

Durham Dynamos won by 33 runs
Riverside Ground, Chester-le-Street
Umpires: Jeff Evans and Michael Gough
Player of the match: Phil Mustard (Durham Dynamos)

- Durham Dynamos won the toss and elected to bat.

15 June
Scorecard

Northamptonshire Steelbacks; 96 (19.5 overs)	v	Warwickshire Bears; 97/4 (18.2 overs)
Johan Botha 28 (26); Keith Barker 3/18 (3.5 overs)		Varun Chopra 34 (38); David Willey 1/5 (2 overs)

Warwickshire Bears won by 6 wickets
County Ground, Northampton
Umpires: Nick Cook and Trevor Jesty
Player of the match: Jeetan Patel (Warks Bears)

- Warwickshire Bears won the toss and elected to field.

15 June (D/N)
Scorecard

Worcestershire Royals; 121/7 (20 overs)	v	Derbyshire Falcons; 106 (19.4 overs)
Vikram Solanki 28 (29); Tom Knight 3/16 (4 overs)		Steffan Jones 24 (22); Chris Whelan 4/21 (4 overs)

Worcestershire Royals won by 15 runs
County Ground, Derby
Umpires: Peter Willey and Stephen Gale
Player of the match: Chris Whelan (Worcs Royals)

- Worcestershire Royals won the toss and elected to bat.

16 June (D/N)
Scorecard

Nottinghamshire Outlaws; 213/4 (20 overs)	v	Durham Dynamos; 159 (19.3 overs)
Alex Hales 67 (39); Mitchell Claydon 2/28 (4 overs)		Gareth Breese 34 (18); Steven Mullaney 3/26 (4 overs)

Nottinghamshire Outlaws won by 54 runs
Trent Bridge, Nottingham
Umpires: Stephen Gale and Trevor Jesty
Player of the match: Alex Hales (Notts Outlaws)

- Nottinghamshire Outlaws won the toss and elected to bat.

17 June
Scorecard

Leicestershire Foxes; 58/1 (5 overs)	v	Durham Dynamos
Josh Cobb 54 (26); Ian Blackwell 1/7 (1 over)

No result
Grace Road, Leicester
Umpires: Richard Kettleborough and Stephen Gale

- Durham Dynamos won the toss and elected to field.

17 June
Scorecard

Warwickshire Bears; 184/6 (20 overs)	v	Worcestershire Royals; 187/9 (19.1 overs)
William Porterfield 54 (34); Shakib Al Hasan 2/24 (3 overs)		Gareth Andrew 65* (32); Steffan Piolet 3/29 (4 overs)

Worcestershire Royals won by 1 wicket
Edgbaston, Birmingham
Umpires: Mark Benson and Peter Hartley
Player of the match: Gareth Andrew (Worcs Royals)

- Worcestershire Royals won the toss and elected to field.

17 June
Scorecard

Yorkshire Carnegie; 178/4 (20 overs)	v	Lancashire Lightning; 167 (19.1 overs)
Andrew Gale 60 (46); Sajid Mahmood 1/20 (4 overs)		Jordan Clark 38 (18); Adil Rashid 4/26 (4 overs)

Yorkshire Carnegie won by 11 runs
Headingley, Leeds
Umpires: Martin Bodenham and Steve Garratt
Player of the match: Andrew Gale (Yorks Carnegie)

- Lancashire Lightning won the toss and elected to field.

17 June (D/N)
Scorecard

Northamptonshire Steelbacks	v	Derbyshire Falcons

Match abandoned
County Ground, Northampton
Umpires: David Millns and Richard Illingworth

- No toss.
- No play possible due to rain.

18 June
Scorecard

(H) Derbyshire Falcons; 160/4 (20 overs)	v	Leicestershire Foxes; 161/5 (19.1 overs)
Martin Guptill 44 (43); Harry Gurney 1-14 (3)		Andrew McDonald 62 (45); Tim Groenewald 2-18 (3.1)

Leicestershire won by 5 wickets
County Ground, Derby

18 June (D/N)
Scorecard

(H) Nottinghamshire Outlaws; 183/6 (20 overs)	v	Northamptonshire Steelbacks; 160/6 (20 overs)
Adam Voges 49 (32); David Willey 3-31 (3)		Alex Wakely 61 (36); Samit Patel 2-29 (4)

Nottinghamshire won by 23 runs
Trent Bridge, Nottingham

19 June
Scorecard

(H) Warwickshire Bears; 109 (19.2 overs)	v	Lancashire Lightning; 110/0 (12.3 overs)
Steffan Piolet 20 (24); Stephen Parry 4-23 (4)		Tom Smith 58 (37)

Lancashire won by 10 wickets
Edgbaston, Birmingham

22 June
Scorecard

Derbyshire Falcons; 152/4 (20 overs)	v	Yorkshire Carnegie (H); 140/5 (20 overs)
Wayne Madsen 61 (48); Ajmal Shahzad 1-27 (4)		Gary Ballance 46 (32); Wes Durston 1-16 (2)

Derbyshire won by 12 runs
Headingley, Leeds

24 June
Scorecard

(H) Durham Dynamos; 200/6 (20 overs)	v	Lancashire Lightning; 117 (17 overs)
Dale Benkenstein 60 (34); Stephen Parry 2-30 (4)		Farveez Maharoof 27 (24); Liam Plunkett 5-31 (4)

Durham won by 83 runs
Riverside Ground, Chester-le-Street

24 June

(H) Warwickshire Bears; 138/5 (18 overs)	v	Yorkshire Carnegie

No result
Edgbaston, Birmingham

24 June
Scorecard

(H) Worcestershire Royals	v	Derbyshire Falcons

No result
County Ground, New Road, Worcester

24 June
Scorecard

(H) Nottinghamshire Outlaws; 188/6 (20 overs)	v	Leicestershire Foxes

No result
Trent Bridge, Nottingham

25 June
Scorecard

Worcestershire Royals; 151/8 (20 overs)	v	Leicestershire Foxes (H); 132/7 (20 overs)
Paul Nixon 44 (40); Saeed Ajmal 3-31 (4)		James Cameron 36 (23); Abdul Razzaq 2-16 (4)

Leicestershire won by 19 runs
Grace Road, Leicester

26 June
Scorecard

Warwickshire Bears; 137/4 (20 overs)	v	Derbyshire Falcons (H); 141/4 (18.5 overs)
Jim Troughton 55 (41); Jonathan Clare 1-5 (2)		Martin Guptill 72 (44); Darren Maddy 1-15 (2)

Derbyshire won by 6 wickets
Highfield, Leek

26 June
Scorecard

(H) Durham Dynamos; 187/5 (20 overs)	v	Leicestershire Foxes; 184/8 (20 overs)
Gordon Muchall 64 (50); Harry Gurney 2-29 (4)		Will Jefferson 63 (30); Dale Benkenstein 2-29 (4)

Durham won by 3 runs
Riverside Ground, Chester-le-Street

26 June
Scorecard

(H) Nottinghamshire Outlaws; 184/4 (20 overs)	v	Lancashire Lightning; 131 (18 overs)
Riki Wessels 76 (49); Stephen Parry 2-33 (4)		Steven Croft 55 (28); Andre Adams 2-19 (4)

Nottinghamshire won by 53 runs
Trent Bridge, Nottingham

26 June
Scorecard

(H) Worcestershire Royals; 183/7 (20 overs)	v	Yorkshire Carnegie; 142 (18.5 overs)
Alexei Kervezee 56 (36); Ajmal Shahzad 3-30 (4)		Gary Ballance 26 (22); Shakib Al Hasan 4-31 (4)

Worcestershire won by 41 runs
County Ground, New Road, Worcester

29 June
Scorecard

(H) Northamptonshire Steelbacks; 129/9 (20 overs)	v	Worcestershire Royals; 130/4 (19.3 overs)
Niall O'Brien 33 (27); Saeed Ajmal 4-14 (4)		Vikram Solanki 62 (61); David Lucas 3-19 (4)

Worcestershire won by 6 wickets
Campbell Park, Milton Keynes

29 June
Scorecard

Yorkshire Carnegie; 144 (20 overs)	v	Leicestershire Foxes (H); 147/2 (16.2 overs)
Andrew Gale 67 (56); Andrew McDonald 3-18 (4)		Andrew McDonald 59 (47); Rich Pyrah 2-25 (4)

Leicestershire won by 8 wickets
Grace Road, Leicester

===== July =====
1 July
Scorecard

(H) Lancashire Lightning; 161/5 (20 overs)	v	Durham Dynamos; 135/9 (20 overs)
Karl Brown 51 (36); Mitchell Claydon 2-24 (3)		Liam Plunkett 41 (26); Gary Keedy 2-17 (4)

Lancashire win by 26 runs
Old Trafford, Manchester

1 July
Scorecard

(H) Worcestershire Royals; 130/7 (20 overs)	v	Leicestershire Foxes; 134/4 (17.3 overs)
Gareth Andrew 54 (42); Matthew Hoggard 2-13 (4)		Andrew McDonald 53 (44); Shakib Al Hasan 1-19 (4)

Leicestershire won by 6 wickets
County Ground, New Road, Worcester

1 July (D/N)
Scorecard

Yorkshire Carnegie; 144 (20 overs)	v	Northamptonshire Steelbacks (H); 132/7 (20 overs)
Joe Sayers 44 (34); Andrew Hall 4-23 (4)		Alex Wakely 38 (33); Ryan Sidebottom 2-18 (4)

Yorkshire won by 12 runs
County Ground, Northampton

1 July (D/N)
Scorecard

(H) Derbyshire Falcons; 170/5 (20 overs)	v	Nottinghamshire Outlaws; 174/5 (19.3 overs)
Martin Guptill 75 (55); Darren Pattinson 2-40 (4)		Alex Hales 76 (40); Wes Durston 2-22 (4)

Nottinghamshire won by 5 wickets
County Ground, Derby

3 July
Scorecard

(H) Durham Dynamos; 161/6 (20 overs)	v	Worcestershire Royals; 133 (19.1 overs)
Ian Blackwell 77 (59); Saeed Ajmal 3-22 (4)		Moeen Ali 29 (22); Paul Collingwood 4-19 (4)

Durham won by 28 runs
Riverside Ground, Chester-le-Street

3 July
Scorecard

Derbyshire Falcons; 81/8 (20 overs)	v	Lancashire Lightning (H); 82/0 (9 overs)
Chesney Hughes 16 (26); Junaid Khan 3-12 (4)		Stephen Moore 52 (33); Tom Knight 0-4 (1)

Lancashire won by 10 wickets
Old Trafford, Manchester

3 July
Scorecard

Northamptonshire Steelbacks; 130/9 (20 overs)	v	Leicestershire Foxes (H); 131/4 (17.5 overs)
Bilal Shafayat 28 (30); Harry Gurney 3-25 (4)		Will Jefferson 41 (21); Johan Botha 1-12 (4)

Leicestershire won by 6 wickets
Grace Road, Leicester

3 July
Scorecard

(H) Yorkshire Carnegie; 152/5 (20 overs)	v	Nottinghamshire Outlaws; 156/4 (18.1 overs)
Andrew Gale 62 (55); Graeme White 1-23 (4)		Tamim Iqbal 47 (37); Iain Wardlaw 2-17 (3.1)

Nottinghamshire won by 6 wickets
Headingley, Leeds

5 July
Scorecard

Nottinghamshire Outlaws; 152 (20 overs)	v	Worcestershire Royals (H); 142/5 (20 overs)
Alex Hales 39 (28); Saeed Ajmal 3-28 (4)		Moeen Ali 51 (36); Steven Mullaney 1-20 (3)

Nottinghamshire won by 10 runs
County Ground, New Road, Worcester

6 July
Scorecard

Derbyshire Falcons; 162/5 (20 overs)	v	Warwickshire Bears (H); 129 (17.2 overs)
Wes Durston 64 (58); Steffan Piolet 2-22 (4)		Varun Chopra 40 (17); Tom Knight 3-19 (4)

Derbyshire won by 33 runs
Edgbaston, Birmingham

6 July
Scorecard

Leicestershire Foxes; 191/4 (19 overs)	v	Yorkshire Carnegie (H); 174/9 (19 overs)
Andrew McDonald 96 (57); David Wainwright 1-24 (4)		Joe Sayers 27 (20); Jigar Naik 3-3 (1)

Leicestershire won by 18 runs (D/L)
Headingley, Leeds

8 July
Scorecard

(H) Durham Dynamos; 0/0 (0 overs)	v	Yorkshire Carnegie

No result
Riverside Ground, Chester-le-Street

8 July
Scorecard

Derbyshire Falcons; 150 (19.4 overs)	v	Leicestershire Foxes (H); 151/8 (19.5 overs)
Greg Smith 36 (25); Abdul Razzaq 3-12 (4)		James Taylor 53 (31); Chesney Hughes 4-23 (4)

Leicestershire won by 2 wickets
Grace Road, Leicester

8 July
Scorecard

(H) Worcestershire Royals; 112/7 (20 overs)	v	Warwickshire Bears; 106/8 (20 overs)
James Cameron 37 (40); Keith Barker 2-10 (2)		Tim Ambrose 27 (29); Jack Shantry 2-23 (4)

Worcestershire won by 6 runs
County Ground, New Road, Worcester

8 July (D/N)
Scorecard

(H) Northamptonshire Steelbacks	v	Nottinghamshire Outlaws

No result
County Ground, Northampton

9 July
Scorecard

(H) Derbyshire Falcons; 133/5 (20 overs)	v	Northamptonshire Steelbacks; 135/3 (18.2 overs)
Garry Park 50 (46); David Willey 2-7 (2)		Johan Botha 54 (48); Mark Turner 3-22 (3.2)

Northamptonshire won by 7 wickets
County Ground, Derby

10 July
Scorecard

Nottinghamshire Outlaws; 105/5 (15 overs)	v	Lancashire Lightning (H); 106/1 (13.3 overs)
Adam Voges 29 (29); Gary Keedy 2-14 (3)		Steven Croft 53 (39); Ben Phillips 1-14 (2.3)

Lancashire won by 9 wickets
Old Trafford, Manchester

10 July
Scorecard

Durham Dynamos; 144/8 (20 overs)	v	Yorkshire Carnegie (H); 150/7 (19.3 overs)
David Miller 54 (41); Rich Pyrah 5-16 (4)		Gary Ballance 48 (35); Dale Benkenstein 2-14 (4)

Yorkshire won by 3 wickets
North Marine Road Ground, Scarborough

11 July
Scorecard

Durham Dynamos; 145/5 (20 overs)	v	Warwickshire Bears (H); 148/6 (20 overs)
Dale Benkenstein 50 (32); Neil Carter 1-16 (3)		Darren Maddy 40 (26); Scott Borthwick 3-19 (3)

Warwickshire won by 4 wickets
Edgbaston, Birmingham

12 July
Scorecard

Lancashire Lightning; 110/9 (20 overs)	v	Northamptonshire Steelbacks (H); 107/5 (20 overs)
Gareth Cross 18 (17); Andrew Hall 3-17 (4)		Alex Wakely 52 (46); Junaid Khan 2-12 (4)

Lancashire won by 3 runs
County Ground, Northampton

13 July (D/N)
Scorecard

(H) Lancashire Lightning; 139/8 (20 overs)	v	Warwickshire Bears; 127/4 (20 overs)
Stephen Moore 76 (58); Darren Maddy 2-16 (2)		William Porterfield 63 (64); Gary Keedy 1-22 (4)

Lancashire won by 12 runs
Old Trafford, Manchester

14 July
Scorecard

(H) Durham Dynamos; 144/7 (20 overs)	v	Northamptonshire Steelbacks; 47 (12.5 overs)
Dale Benkenstein 31 (19); David Willey 2-22 (4)		Niall O'Brien 14 (14); Mitchell Claydon 3-6 (3.5)

Durham won by 97 runs
Riverside Ground, Chester-le-Street

15 July (D/N)
Scorecard

(H) Derbyshire Falcons; 127/7 (20 overs)	v	Yorkshire Carnegie; 128/2 (18 overs)
Martin Guptill 46 (39); Ben Sanderson 4-21 (4)		Joe Sayers 43 (38); Ross Whiteley 1-16 (2)

Yorkshire won by 8 wickets
County Ground, Derby

15 July (D/N)
Scorecard

(H) Lancashire Lightning; 188/5 (20 overs)	v	Northamptonshire Steelbacks; 124/7 (20 overs)
Steven Croft 51 (33); Lee Daggett 2-24 (2)		Alex Wakely 28 (18); Gary Keedy 2-26 (4)

Lancashire won by 64 runs
Old Trafford, Manchester

15 July (D/N)
Scorecard

(H) Nottinghamshire Outlaws; 167/6 (20 overs)	v	Worcestershire Royals; 142 (19.3 overs)
Adam Voges 55 (40); Jack Shantry 3-31 (4)		Daryl Mitchell 45 (36); Darren Pattinson 3-20 (4)

Nottinghamshire won by 25 runs
Trent Bridge, Nottingham

15 July (D/N)
Scorecard

(H) Warwickshire Bears; 166/8 (20 overs)	v	Leicestershire Foxes; 136/5 (14.5 overs)
Jim Troughton 46 (32); Claude Henderson 3-25 (4)		James Taylor 49 (33); Jeetan Patel 2-15 (3)

Leicestershire won by 5 wickets (D/L)
Edgbaston, Birmingham

=== South Group ===
==== Table ====
Pos	Team	Pld	W	L	T	NR	Pts	NRR
1	Hampshire Royals^{[nb1]} (Note: The Hampshire Royals began the tournament on minus two points for a poor pitch from last season.)	16	11	2	0	3	23	1.093
2	Sussex Sharks	16	9	5	0	2	20	0.061
3	Kent Spitfires	16	9	5	0	2	20	−0.205
4	Somerset	16	7	4	1	4	19	0.978
5	Surrey Lions	16	7	6	0	3	17	0.131
6	Essex Eagles	16	7	7	0	2	16	−0.086
7	Glamorgan Dragons	16	5	9	0	2	12	0.045
8	Gloucestershire Gladiators	16	4	11	0	1	9	−0.473
9	Middlesex Panthers	16	2	12	1	1	6	−1.247

Source: Cricinfo

===== June =====
1 June (D/N)
Scorecard

Somerset; 145/7 (20 overs)	v	Hampshire Royals; 146/3 (18.3 overs)
Peter Trego 55 (37); Dimitri Mascarenhas 3/19 (4 overs)		Michael Lumb 53 (33); Peter Trego 2/24 (3.3 overs)

Hampshire Royals won by 7 wickets
The Rose Bowl, Southampton
Umpires: Steve O'Shaughnessy and Tim Robinson
Player of the match: Dimitri Mascarenhas (Hants Royals)

- Somerset won the toss and elected to bat.
- Lewis Gregory (Somerset) made his T20 debut.

2 June (D/N)
Scorecard

Gloucestershire Gladiators; 155/8 (20 overs)	v	Surrey Lions; 156/2 (16.5 overs)
Will Gidman 40* (37); Dirk Nannes 3/25 (4 overs)		Steven Davies 92* (55); Kevin O'Brien 1/21 (2.5 overs)

Surrey Lions won by 8 wickets
The Oval, London
Umpires: Mark Benson and Neil Bainton
Player of the match: Steven Davies (Surrey Lions)

- Surrey Lions won the toss and elected to field.
- Ed Young, Richard Coughtrie and Will Gidman (Gloucestershire Gladiators) made their T20 debuts.

2 June (D/N)
Scorecard

Sussex Sharks; 173/4 (20 overs)	v	Essex Eagles; 141 (19.1 overs)
Murray Goodwin 53 (39); Tim Phillips 3/31 (4 overs)		Scott Styris 47 (29); Naved-ul-Hasan 5/17 (3.1 overs)

Sussex Sharks won by 32 runs
County Ground, Hove
Umpires: Neil Mallender and Richard Kettleborough
Player of the match: Naved-ul-Hasan (Sussex Sharks)

- Essex Eagles won the toss and elected to field.

3 June
Scorecard

Kent Spitfires; 163/8 (20 overs)	v	Somerset; 166/1 (17 overs)
Darren Stevens 68 (41); Lewis Gregory 3/26 (4 overs)		Roelof van der Merwe 89* (51); Charl Langeveldt 1/42 (4 overs)

Somerset won by 9 wickets
Nevill Ground, Royal Tunbridge Wells
Umpires: Neil Bainton and Richard Kettleborough
Player of the match: Roelof van der Merwe (Somerset)

- Kent Spitfires won the toss and elected to bat.
- Adam Ball (Kent Spitfires) made his T20 debut.

3 June (D/N)
Scorecard

Essex Eagles; 204/4 (20 overs)	v	Gloucestershire Gladiators; 82 (13.3 overs)
Ravi Bopara 49 (36); Ed Young 2/32 (4 overs)		Kane Williamson 20 (15); Scott Styris 3/12 (3.3 overs)

Essex Eagles won by 122 runs
County Ground, Chelmsford
Umpires: Neil Mallender and Steve O'Shaughnessy
Player of the match: Scott Styris (Essex Eagles)

- Gloucestershire Gladiators won the toss and elected to field.

3 June (D/N)
Scorecard

Surrey Lions; 140/7 (20 overs)	v	Hampshire Royals; 144/3 (19 overs)
Zander de Bruyn 52 (38); Imran Tahir 2/15 (4 overs)		James Vince 51* (39); Zander de Bruyn 1/11 (1 over)

Hampshire Royals won by 7 wickets
The Rose Bowl, Southampton
Umpires: Peter Willey and Rob Bailey
Player of the match: James Vince (Hants Royals)

- Hampshire Royals won the toss and elected to field.

3 June (D/N)
Scorecard

Glamorgan Dragons; 199/4 (20 overs)	v	Middlesex Panthers; 137 (17.5 overs)
Alviro Petersen 72 (48); Paul Stirling 2/25 (3 overs)		Chris Rogers 28 (24); Alex Jones 3/16 (3 overs)

Glamorgan Dragons won by 45 runs (D/L)
Sophia Gardens, Cardiff
Umpires: John Steele and Nigel Cowley
Player of the match: Alviro Petersen (Glamorgan Dragons)

- Glamorgan Dragons won the toss and elected to bat.
- Middlesex Panthers were set a revised target of 183 from 18 overs due to rain.
- Alex Jones and Chris Cooke (Glamorgan Dragons) made their T20 debuts.

5 June
Scorecard

Gloucestershire Gladiators; 97/9 (17 overs)	v	Sussex Sharks; 98/3 (14.3 overs)
Chris Taylor 22 (22); Monty Panesar 3/14 (3 overs)		Lou Vincent 31* (19); Jon Lewis 1/13 (2 overs)

Sussex Sharks won by 7 wickets
County Ground, Bristol
Umpires: John Steele and Peter Willey
Player of the match: Monty Panesar (Sussex Sharks)

- Sussex Sharks won the toss and elected to field.
- The match was reduced to 17 overs per side due to rain.

5 June
Scorecard

Somerset; 235/5 (20 overs)	v	Middlesex Panthers; 195/9 (20 overs)
Craig Kieswetter 59 (22); Anthony Ireland 2/36 (4 overs)		John Simpson 60* (27); Gemaal Hussain 3/40 (4 overs)

Somerset won by 40 runs
County Ground, Taunton
Umpires: Jeremy Lloyds and Stephen Gale
Player of the match: Craig Kieswetter (Somerset)

- Middlesex Panthers won the toss and elected to field.

5 June
Scorecard

Hampshire Royals; 78/1 (5 overs)	v	Kent Spitfires; 58/2 (5 overs)
Michael Lumb 35 (11); Adam Ball 1/28 (1 over)		Darren Stevens 45* (16); Simon Jones 2/2 (1 over)

Hampshire Royals won by 20 runs
Nevill Ground, Royal Tunbridge Wells
Umpires: David Millns and Steve O'Shaughnessy
Player of the match: Michael Lumb (Hampshire Royals)

- Kent Spitfires won the toss and elected to field.
- The match was reduced to 5 overs per side due to rain.

8 June (D/N)
Scorecard

Sussex Sharks; 168/6 (20 overs)	v	Essex Eagles; 151/7 (20 overs)
Luke Wright 81* (51); Tim Phillips 4/27 (4 overs)		Owais Shah 39 (25); Chris Liddle 3/25 (4 overs)

Sussex Sharks won by 17 runs
County Ground, Chelmsford
Umpires: Michael Gough and Richard Illingworth
Player of the match: Luke Wright (Sussex Sharks)

- Essex Eagles won the toss and elected to field.

8 June (D/N)
Scorecard

Glamorgan Dragons; 120/9 (20 overs)	v	Hampshire Royals; 121/8 (19.2 overs)
Jim Allenby 28 (21); Danny Briggs 4/24 (4 overs)		James Vince 32 (24); Dean Cosker 2/14 (4 overs)

Hampshire Royals won by 2 wickets
The Rose Bowl, Southampton
Umpires: Martin Bodenham and Peter Willey
Player of the match: Danny Briggs (Hampshire Royals)

- Glamorgan Dragons won the toss and elected to bat.

9 June (D/N)
Scorecard

Middlesex Panthers; 150/5 (20 overs)	v	Essex Eagles; 155/5 (18 overs)
Neil Dexter 32 (26); Tim Southee 3/21 (4 overs)		Owais Shah 78* (50); Tom Smith 2/25 (4 overs)

Essex Eagles won by 5 wickets
Lord's, London
Umpires: Jeremy Lloyds and Michael Gough
Player of the match: Owais Shah (Essex Eagles)

- Middlesex Panthers won the toss and elected to bat.

10 June
Scorecard

Hampshire Royals; 165/4 (20 overs)	v	Gloucestershire Gladiators; 156/6 (20 overs)
Neil McKenzie 89* (53); Ed Young 2/14 (4 overs)		Alex Gidman 43* (25); Danny Briggs 2/26 (4 overs)

Hampshire Royals won by 9 runs
Archdeacon Meadow, Gloucester
Umpires: Jeff Evans and Nigel Cowley
Player of the match: Neil McKenzie (Hampshire Royals)

- Gloucestershire Gladiators won the toss and elected to field.
- Ian Cockbain (Gloucestershire Gladiators) made his T20 debut.

10 June
Scorecard

Somerset	v	Kent Spitfires

Match abandoned
County Ground, Taunton
Umpires: Richard Illingworth and Trevor Jesty

- No toss.
- No play was possible due to rain

10 June (D/N)
Scorecard

Glamorgan Dragons; 167/7 (20 overs)	v	Surrey Lions
Jim Allenby 63 (44); Jade Dernbach 3/30 (4 overs)

No result
The Oval, London
Umpires: Michael Gough and Nick Cook

- Surrey Lions won the toss and elected to field.
- No further play was possible due to rain.

10 June (D/N)
Scorecard

Sussex Sharks; 163/8 (20 overs)	v	Middlesex Panthers; 164/5 (19.5 overs)
Luke Wright 71 (45); Neil Dexter 4/21 (3 overs)		Chris Rogers 46 (40); Monty Panesar 2/28 (4 overs)

Middlesex Panthers won by 5 wickets
County Ground, Hove
Umpires: Mark Benson and Martin Bodenham
Player of the match: Scott Newman (Middx Panthers)

- Sussex Sharks won the toss and elected to bat.

11 June
Scorecard

Gloucestershire Gladiators; 168/6 (20 overs)	v	Surrey Lions; 122 (19.1 overs)
Ian Cockbain 78 (46); Jade Dernbach 3/27 (4 overs)		Kevin Pietersen 30 (28); David Payne 3/20 (4 overs)

Gloucestershire Gladiators won by 46 runs
Archdeacon Meadow, Gloucester
Umpires: Peter Willey and Stephen Gale
Player of the match: Ian Cockbain (Gloucs Gladiators)

- Surrey Lions won the toss and elected to field.

11 June (D/N)
Scorecard

Glamorgan Dragons; 154/5 (20 overs)	v	Kent Spitfires; 155/4 (19.4 overs)
Alviro Petersen 65 (56); Charl Langeveldt 2/38 (4 overs)		Sam Northeast 33* (20); Robert Croft 2/21 (4 overs)

Kent Spitfires won by 6 wickets
Sophia Gardens, Cardiff
Umpires: Jeff Evans and Richard Illingworth
Player of the match: Wahab Riaz (Kent Spitfires)

- Kent Spitfires won the toss and elected to field.
- Sam Billings (Kent Spitfires) made his T20 debut.

12 June
Scorecard

Somerset	v	Hampshire Royals

Match abandoned
County Ground, Taunton
Umpires: Jeremy Lloyds and John Steele

- No toss
- No play possible due to rain.

13 June (D/N)
Scorecard

Surrey Lions; 154/7 (20 overs)	v	Essex Eagles; 111 (17.3 overs)
Tom Maynard 45 (37); Graham Napier 2/9 (2 overs)		James Foster 31 (24); Yasir Arafat 3/15 (3 overs)

Surrey Lions won by 43 runs
The Oval, London
Umpires: David Millns and Trevor Jesty
Player of the match: Zafar Ansari (Surrey Lions)

- Surrey Lions won the toss and elected to bat.
- Zafar Ansari (Surrey Lions) made his T20 debut.

14 June
Scorecard

Middlesex Panthers; 102 (19.1 overs)	v	Glamorgan Dragons; 104/6 (17.1 overs)
Chris Rogers 30 (21); Dean Cosker 3/11 (4 overs)		Mark Wallace 40* (41); Ryan McLaren 3/7 (3 overs)

Glamorgan Dragons won by 4 wickets
Old Deer Park, Richmond
Umpires: David Millns and Rob Bailey
Player of the match: Mark Wallace (Glamorgan Dragons)

- Middlesex Panthers won the toss and elected to bat.

14 June (D/N)
Scorecard

Somerset; 90 (17.2 overs)	v	Sussex Sharks; 91/6 (17.3 overs)
Marcus Trescothick 33 (23); Ollie Rayner 5/18 (4 overs)		Murray Goodwin 27 (35); Roelof van der Merwe 2/15 (3 overs)

Sussex Sharks won by 4 wickets
County Ground, Hove
Umpires: Mark Benson and Martin Bodenham
Player of the match: Ollie Rayner (Sussex Sharks)

- Sussex Sharks won the toss and elected to field.

15 June
Scorecard

Gloucestershire Gladiators; 166 (20 overs)	v	Kent Spitfires; 167/2 (18.5 overs)
Hamish Marshall 47 (30); Wahab Riaz 5/17 (3 overs)		Azhar Mahmood 106* (57); David Payne 1/27 (3 overs)

Kent Spitfires won by 8 wickets
County Ground, Beckenham
Umpires: David Millns and Richard Kettleborough
Player of the match: Azhar Mahmood (Kent Spitfires)

- Gloucestershire Gladiators won the toss and elected to bat.
- Wahab Riaz (Kent Spitfires) took a hat-trick.

15 June (D/N)
Scorecard

Somerset; 225/2 (20 overs)	v	Essex Eagles; 82 (10.3 overs)
Marcus Trescothick 108* (61); David Masters 1/21 (4 overs)		Ravi Bopara 29 (14); Craig Meschede 3/9 (1.3 overs)

Somerset won by 143 runs
County Ground, Chelmsford
Umpires: Nigel Llong and Rob Bailey
Player of the match: Marcus Trescothick (Somerset)

- Essex Eagles won the toss and elected to field.

16 June (D/N)
Scorecard

Sussex Sharks; 165/8 (20 overs)	v	Middlesex Panthers; 116 (18.5 overs)
Murray Goodwin 48 (31); Steven Finn 2/19 (4 overs)		Scott Newman 44 (42); Chris Liddle 4/20 (3.5 overs)

Sussex Sharks won by 49 runs
Lord's, London
Umpires: Richard Illingworth and Richard Kettleborough
Player of the match: Luke Wright (Sussex Sharks)

- Middlesex Panthers won the toss and elected to field.
- Kirk Wernars (Sussex Sharks)

17 June
Scorecard

Gloucestershire Gladiators	v	Essex Eagles

Match abandoned
County Ground, Bristol
Umpires: Jeff Evans and Rob Bailey

- No toss.
- No play possible due to rain.

17 June
Scorecard

Somerset	v	Surrey Lions

Match abandoned
County Ground, Taunton
Umpires: Michael Gough and Nigel Cowley

- No toss.
- No play possible due to rain.

17 June (D/N)
Scorecard

Sussex Sharks	v	Kent Spitfires

Match abandoned
County Ground, Hove
Umpires: Neil Bainton and Nigel Llong

- No toss.
- No play possible due to rain.

17 June (D/N)
Scorecard

Hampshire Royals; 5/0 (1 over)	v	Glamorgan Dragons (H)

No result
Sophia Gardens, Cardiff

18 June (D/N)
Scorecard

(H) Kent Spitfires; 115/9 (20 overs)	v	Middlesex Panthers; 106/7 (20 overs)
James Tredwell 34 (28); Anthony Ireland 3-7 (4)		Steven Crook 23 (19); Azhar Mahmood 3-14 (4)

Kent won by 9 runs
St Lawrence Ground, Canterbury

21 June (D/N)
Scorecard

(H) Glamorgan Dragons; 141/7 (20 overs)	v	Essex Eagles; 145/6 (19.5 overs)
Chris Cooke 34 (18); Tim Phillips 3-18 (4)		Owais Shah 60 (45); Graham Wagg 1-16 (4)

Essex won by 4 wickets
Sophia Gardens, Cardiff

23 June (D/N)
Scorecard

(H) Surrey Lions; 163/5 (20 overs)	v	Middlesex Panthers; 142/3 (20 overs)
Tom Maynard 50 (37); Neil Dexter 3-18 (4)		Scott Newman 61 (58); Gareth Batty 1-17 (4)

Surrey won by 21 runs
Kennington Oval, London

23 June (D/N)
Scorecard

(H) Glamorgan Dragons; 137/3 (20 overs)	v	Sussex Sharks; 135/4 (20 overs)
Alviro Petersen 38 (34); Umar Gul 2-15 (4)		Chris Nash 64 (54); Dean Cosker 1-19 (4)

Glamorgan won by 2 runs
Sophia Gardens, Cardiff

23 June (D/N)
Scorecard

(H) Essex Eagles; 162/7 (20 overs)	v	Hampshire Royals; 136 (18.3 overs)
Tim Southee 74 (34); Dominic Cork 2-35 (4)		James Vince 52 (44); Tim Phillips 4-29 (4)

Essex won by 26 runs
County Ground, Chelmsford

24 June
Scorecard

Kent Spitfires; 149/3 (20 overs)	v	Middlesex Panthers (H); 79/1 (8 overs)
Joe Denly 84 (64); Tom Smith 2-26 (4)		Paul Stirling 51 (23); Azhar Mahmood 1-21 (3)

Middlesex won by 28 runs (D/L)
Uxbridge Cricket Club Ground

24 June
Scorecard

(H) Somerset; 177/4 (15 overs)	v	Sussex Sharks; 40/2 (3.4 overs)
Marcus Trescothick 87 (39); Chris Liddle 2-20 (3)		Lou Vincent 22 (10); Steve Kirby 1-10 (1.4)

No result
County Ground, Taunton

24 June (D/N)
Scorecard

(H) Essex Eagles	v	Surrey Lions

No result
County Ground, Chelmsford

24 June (D/N)
Scorecard

(H) Hampshire Royals; 139/7 (20 overs)	v	Gloucestershire Gladiators; 107 (16.4 overs)
Jimmy Adams 47 (33); Muthiah Muralidaran 2-15 (4)		Kane Williamson 50 (42); Shahid Afridi 5-20 (4)

Hampshire won by 16 runs (D/L)
The Rose Bowl, Southampton

26 June
Scorecard

Gloucestershire Gladiators; 254/3 (20 overs)	v	Middlesex Panthers (H); 149/8 (20 overs)
Kevin O'Brien 119 (52); Toby Roland-Jones 2-42 (4)		John Simpson 38 (27); Jon Lewis 3-31 (4)

Gloucestershire won by 105 runs
Uxbridge Cricket Club Ground

26 June
Scorecard

Surrey Lions; 150/4 (20 overs)	v	Kent Spitfires (H); 153/4 (18.1 overs)
Tom Maynard 76 (46); Azhar Mahmood 2-26 (4)		Martin van Jaarsveld 62 (39); Dirk Nannes 2-27 (4)

Kent won by 6 wickets
Kent County Cricket Ground, Beckenham

26 June
Scorecard

Glamorgan Dragons; 166/8 (20 overs)	v	Somerset (H); 172/3 (15.4 overs)
Chris Cooke 47 (40); Max Waller 2-20 (4)		Marcus Trescothick 58 (28); Jim Allenby 1-16 (2)

Somerset won by 7 wickets
County Ground, Taunton

27 June (D/N)
Scorecard

(H) Hampshire Royals; 126/8 (20 overs)	v	Sussex Sharks; 91 (17.5 overs)
Shahid Afridi 29 (17); Naved-ul-Hasan 2-19 (3)		Luke Wright 24 (20); Shahid Afridi 3-10 (3)

Hampshire won by 35 runs
The Rose Bowl, Southampton

30 June (D/N)
Scorecard

Somerset; 169/7 (20 overs)	v	Surrey Lions (H); 131/8 (20 overs)
James Hildreth 58 (49); Stuart Meaker 2-16 (2)		Jason Roy 32 (22); Arul Suppiah 3-22 (4)

Somerset won by 38 runs
Kennington Oval, London

30 June (D/N)
Scorecard

(H) Hampshire Royals; 141/6 (20 overs)	v	Kent Spitfires; 72 (14 overs)
Neil McKenzie 48 (46); Martin van Jaarsveld 3-20 (4)		Darren Stevens 20 (18); Dimitri Mascarenhas 3-29 (4)

Hampshire won by 69 runs
The Rose Bowl, Southampton

1 July
Scorecard

Somerset; 121/9 (20 overs)	v	Gloucestershire Gladiators (H); 124/8 (19.3 overs)
Marcus Trescothick 28 (17); Jack Taylor 4-16 (4)		Jack Taylor 38 (28); Lewis Gregory 4-15 (4)

Gloucestershire won by 2 wickets
County Ground, Bristol

1 July
Scorecard

(H) Middlesex Panthers; 121/9 (20 overs)	v	Hampshire Royals; 124/3 (17 overs)
Sam Robson 28 (30); Shahid Afridi 3-16 (4)		James Vince 39 (22); Steven Crook 2-17 (4)

Hampshire won by 7 wickets
Uxbridge Cricket Club Ground

1 July (D/N)
Scorecard

(H) Kent Spitfires; 153/8 (20 overs)	v	Essex Eagles; 156/2 (17.5 overs)
Mark Pettini 36 (26); Adam Ball 2-28 (4)		Rob Key 75 (52); Tim Phillips 1-29 (4)

Kent won by 8 wickets
St Lawrence Ground, Canterbury

1 July (D/N)
Scorecard

Surrey Lions; 169/4 (20 overs)	v	Glamorgan Dragons (H); 151/7 (20 overs)
Zander de Bruyn 70 (52); James Harris 2-38 (4)		Graham Wagg 46 (27); Gareth Batty 2-23 (4)

Surrey won by 18 runs
Sophia Gardens, Cardiff

2 July
Scorecard

(H) Essex Eagles; 139/9 (20 overs)	v	Middlesex Panthers; 131/8 (20 overs)
Ryan ten Doeschate 28 (20); Steven Crook 2-27 (4)		Ryan McLaren 35 (30); Graham Napier 2-21 (4)

Essex won by 8 runs
County Ground, Chelmsford

3 July
Scorecard

Gloucestershire Gladiators; 121 (18.2 overs)	v	Sussex Sharks (H); 125/4 (18.1 overs)
Hamish Marshall 41 (28); Chris Nash 4-7 (3)		Lou Vincent 44 (45); Muthiah Muralidaran 2-25 (4)

Sussex won by 6 wickets
Arundel Castle Cricket Club Ground

3 July
Scorecard

Glamorgan Dragons; 138/6 (20 overs)	v	Kent Spitfires (H); 142/5 (19.2 overs)
Alviro Petersen 33 (23); James Tredwell 1-19 (4)		Sam Northeast 39 (25); Robert Croft 3-27 (4)

Kent won by 5 wickets
St Lawrence Ground, Canterbury

4 July
Scorecard

(H) Essex Eagles; 209/5 (20 overs)	v	Somerset; 144 (19.3 overs)
Mark Pettini 81 (52); Max Waller 1-15 (4)		Jos Buttler 31 (16); Tim Phillips 4-22 (4)

Essex won by 65 runs
Recreation Ground, Bath

4 July
Scorecard

(H) Surrey Lions; 203/2 (20 overs)	v	Sussex Sharks; 185/5 (20 overs)
Steven Davies 99 (56); Chris Nash 1-11 (2)		Luke Wright 72 (31); Chris Schofield 2-28 (4)

Surrey won by 18 runs
Whitgift School, Croydon

5 July (D/N)
Scorecard

(H) Glamorgan Dragons; 98 (17.4 overs)	v	Somerset; 99/5 (14.3 overs)
Gareth Rees 34 (20); Murali Kartik 2-15 (4)		Kieron Pollard 31 (20); Robert Croft 3-9 (3)

Somerset won by 5 wickets
Sophia Gardens, Cardiff

6 July
Scorecard

(H) Gloucestershire Gladiators; 115/4 (16 overs)	v	Kent Spitfires; 79/3 (9.1 overs)
Kevin O'Brien 43 (24); Azhar Mahmood 1-14 (3)		Joe Denly 23 (20); Muthiah Muralidaran 1-7 (2)

Kent won by 7 wickets (D/L)
County Ground, Bristol

6 July (D/N)
Scorecard

(H) Hampshire Royals; 151/7 (20 overs)	v	Essex Eagles; 122/6 (17 overs)
James Vince 55 (46); Tim Southee 3-30 (4)		Ravi Bopara 48 (41); Dimitri Mascarenhas 3-20 (4)

Hampshire won by 9 runs (D/L)
The Rose Bowl, Southampton

7 July (D/N)
Scorecard

Surrey Lions; 182/3 (20 overs)	v	Middlesex Panthers (H); 173/8 (20 overs)
Jason Roy 52 (37); Jamie Dalrymple 2-23 (3)		Neil Dexter 49 (37); Dirk Nannes 5-40 (4)

Surrey won by 9 runs
Lord's, London

7 July (D/N)
Scorecard

Glamorgan Dragons; 132/8 (20 overs)	v	Sussex Sharks (H); 134/6 (19.2 overs)
Chris Cooke 42 (18); Umar Gul 3-24 (3)		Murray Goodwin 41 (34); Alex Jones 3-18 (3)

Sussex won by 4 wickets
County Ground, Hove

8 July
Scorecard

(H) Somerset; 170/4 (20 overs)	v	Gloucestershire Gladiators; 155/9 (20 overs)
Jos Buttler 72 (45); David Payne 2-27 (4)		Hamish Marshall 52 (44); Kieron Pollard 3-25 (4)

Somerset won by 15 runs
County Ground, Taunton

8 July (D/N)
Scorecard

(H) Surrey Lions; 151/5 (20 overs)	v	Hampshire Royals; 113 (18.4 overs)
Tom Maynard 47 (38); Dimitri Mascarenhas 2-23 (4)		Shahid Afridi 36 (26); Chris Tremlett 4-16 (4)

Surrey won by 38 runs
Kennington Oval, London

8 July (D/N)
Scorecard

Glamorgan Dragons; 144/9 (20 overs)	v	Essex Eagles (H); 146/5 (19.1 overs)
Gareth Rees 38 (34); Tim Southee 6-16 (4)		Scott Styris 42 (21); Alviro Petersen 1-13 (2)

Essex won by 5 wickets
County Ground, Chelmsford

8 July (D/N)
Scorecard

Sussex Sharks; 159/6 (20 overs)	v	Kent Spitfires (H); 144/8 (20 overs)
Matt Prior 89 (59); Wahab Riaz 3-22 (4)		Darren Stevens 65 (53); Umar Gul 3-26 (4)

Sussex won by 15 runs
St Lawrence Ground, Canterbury

10 July
Scorecard

(H) Middlesex Panthers; 143/6 (20 overs)	v	Somerset; 143/7 (20 overs)
Peter Trego 36 (33); Ryan McLaren 3-37 (4)		Scott Newman 33 (26); Lewis Gregory 3-26 (4)

Match tied
John Walker's Ground, Southgate

10 July
Scorecard

(H) Gloucestershire Gladiators; 81 (18.3 overs)	v	Glamorgan Dragons; 86/0 (14 overs)
Kane Williamson 20 (27); Alex Jones 2-10 (3)		Alviro Petersen 42 (45)

Glamorgan won by 10 wickets
County Ground, Bristol

10 July
Scorecard

Hampshire Royals; 193/2 (20 overs)	v	Sussex Sharks (H); 81 (17.1 overs)
James Vince 85 (49); Naved Arif 1-26 (4)		Ollie Rayner 15 (19); Danny Briggs 4-17 (3.1)

Hampshire won by 112 runs
County Ground, Hove

13 July
Scorecard

(H) Gloucestershire Gladiators; 165/4 (20 overs)	v	Middlesex Panthers; 140/7 (20 overs)
Kevin O'Brien 58 (29); Steven Finn 1-18		Jamie Dalrymple 36 (34); Ian Saxelby 2-23 (4)

Gloucestershire won by 25 runs
County Ground, Bristol

14 July (D/N)
Scorecard

Kent Spitfires; 181/9 (20 overs)	v	Surrey Lions (H); 166 (19.2 overs)
Azhar Mahmood 60 (40); Jade Dernbach 2-23 (4)		Jason Roy 53 (34); Charl Langeveldt 3-37 (4)

Kent won by 15 runs
Kennington Oval, London

15 July (D/N)
Scorecard

Kent Spitfires; 183/3 (20 overs)	v	Essex Eagles (H); 168/9 (20 overs)
Joe Denly 69 (54); Ravi Bopara 1-19 (2)		Scott Styris 40 (27); Darren Stevens 4-21 (4)

Kent won by 15 runs
County Ground, Chelmsford

15 July (D/N)
Scorecard

Gloucestershire Gladiators; 133/10 (20 overs)	v	Glamorgan Dragons (H); 67/2 (7 overs)
Hamish Marshall 35 (29); Will Owen 3-21 (4)		Gareth Rees 30 (20); Ian Saxelby 1-14 (2)

Glamorgan won by 8 wickets (D/L)
Sophia Gardens, Cardiff

15 July (D/N)
Scorecard

(H) Hampshire Royals; 116/2 (13 overs)	v	Middlesex Panthers

No result
The Rose Bowl, Southampton

15 July (D/N)
Scorecard

(H) Sussex Sharks; 178/8 (20 overs)	v	Surrey Lions; 167/7 (20 overs)
Murray Goodwin 100 (59); Jade Dernbach 3-31 (4)		Jason Roy 50 (42); Chris Liddle 3-29 (4)

Sussex won by 11 runs
County Ground, Hove

== Knockout stage ==
Quarter-finals
N1	Nottinghamshire Outlaws (H)	169/5
S4	Somerset	172/4
N4	Durham Dynamos	99
S1	Hampshire Royals (H)	154/6
N2	Leicestershire Foxes (H)	206/7
S3	Kent Spitfires	203/3
N3	Lancashire Lightning	152/8
S2	Sussex Sharks (H)	132/8

Semi-finals
S4	Somerset (D/L; SO)	94/5
S1	Hampshire Royals	138/4
N2	Leicestershire Foxes (D/L; SO)	132/6
N3	Lancashire Lightning	79/6

Final
S4	Somerset	127/9
N2	Leicestershire Foxes	145/6

=== Quarter-finals ===
6 August
17:00
Scorecard

Kent Spitfires; 203/3 (20 overs)	v	Leicestershire Foxes (H); 206/7 (19.2 overs)
Azhar Mahmood 91 (52); Harry Gurney 1/34 (4 overs)		Andrew McDonald 53 (32); Darren Stevens 2/26 (4 overs)

Leicestershire Foxes won by 3 wickets
Grace Road, Leicester
Umpires: Jeff Evans and Tim Robinson
Player of the match: Paul Nixon (Leics Foxes)

- Leicestershire Foxes won the toss and elected to field.

7 August
13:45
Scorecard

Nottinghamshire Outlaws (H); 169/5 (20 overs)	v	Somerset; 172/4 (19.1 overs)
Alex Hales 78 (51); Lewis Gregory 2/35 (4 overs); Alfonso Thomas 2/35 (4 overs)		Craig Kieswetter 49 (37); Graeme White 1/21 (3 overs)

Somerset won by 6 wickets
Trent Bridge, Nottingham
Umpires: Peter Hartley and Trevor Jesty
Player of the match: Kieron Pollard (Somerset)

- Nottinghamshire Outlaws won the toss and elected to bat.

7 August
17:00
Scorecard

Hampshire Royals (H); 154/6 (20 overs)	v	Durham Dynamos; 99 (18.3 overs)
Neil McKenzie 56 (44); Mitchell Claydon 2/15 (3 overs)		Ben Stokes 28 (23); Danny Briggs 5/19 (4 overs)

Hampshire Royals won by 55 runs
The Rose Bowl, Southampton
Umpires: Nick Cook and Richard Illingworth
Player of the match: Danny Briggs (Hants Royals)

- Hampshire Royals won the toss and elected to bat.

8 August
19:10 (D/N)
Scorecard

Lancashire Lightning; 152/8 (20 overs)	v	Sussex Sharks (H); 132/8 (20 overs)
Paul Horton 49* (45); Wayne Parnell 2/26 (4 overs)		Naved-ul-Hasan 34 (27); Farveez Maharoof 2/14 (4 overs)

Lancashire Lightning won by 20 runs
County Ground, Hove
Umpires: Rob Bailey and Michael Gough
Player of the match: Karl Brown (Lancashire Lightning)

- Lancashire Lightning won the toss and elected to bat.

=== Semi-finals ===
27 August
11:00
Scorecard

Leicestershire Foxes; 132/6 (18 overs)	v	Lancashire Lightning; 79/6 (11 overs)
Abdul Razzaq 32* (28); Stephen Parry 1/15 (4 overs)		Stephen Moore 43 (31); Josh Cobb 2/6 (1 over)

Scores level (D/L); Leicestershire won the Super Over
Edgbaston, Birmingham
Umpires: Michael Gough and Neil Mallender
Player of the match: Will Jefferson (Leics)

- Lancashire won the toss and elected to field.
- Rain originally reduced the match to 18 overs per side.
- "Rain further reduced Lancashire's innings to 11 overs with a revised target of 80."

27 August
14:30
Scorecard

Hampshire Royals; 138/4 (15.5 overs)	v	Somerset; 94/6 (10 overs)
Shahid Afridi 80 (42); Craig Meschede 1/14 (2 overs)		Jos Buttler 32 (16); Imran Tahir 2/20 (2 overs)

Scores level (D/L); Somerset won the Super Over
Edgbaston, Birmingham
Umpires: Rob Bailey and Richard Illingworth
Player of the match: Jos Buttler (Somst)

- Somerset won the toss and elected to field.
- Rain reduced Hampshire's innings to 15.5 overs and revised Somerset's target to 95 runs from 10 overs.

=== Final ===
27 August
18:45 (D/N)
Scorecard

Leicestershire Foxes; 145/6 (20 overs)	v	Somerset; 127/9 (20 overs)
Will Jefferson 35 (29); Kieron Pollard 2/24 (4 overs)		Peter Trego 35 (35); Josh Cobb 4/22 (3 overs)

Leicestershire won by 18 runs
Edgbaston, Birmingham
Umpires: Rob Bailey and Neil Mallender
Player of the match: Josh Cobb (Leics)

- Somerset won the toss and elected to field.

== Statistics ==
=== Highest team totals ===
The following table lists the six highest team scores in the season.

Team	Total	Opponent	Ground
Gloucestershire Gladiators	254/3	Middlesex Panthers	Uxbridge Cricket Club Ground
Somerset	235/5	Middlesex Panthers	County Ground, Taunton
Somerset	225/2	Essex Eagles	County Ground, Chelmsford
Nottinghamshire Outlaws	215/6	Yorkshire Carnegie	Trent Bridge, Nottingham
Nottinghamshire Outlaws	213/4	Durham Dynamos	Trent Bridge, Nottingham
Essex Eagles	209/5	Somerset	Recreation Ground, Bath

=== Most runs ===
The top five highest run scorers (total runs) in the season are included in this table.

Player	Team	Runs	Inns	Avg	S/R	HS	100s	50s	4s	6s
Andrew McDonald	Leicestershire Foxes	584	17	53.09	128.35	96*	0	7	53	9
Alex Hales	Nottinghamshire Outlaws	544	16	34.00	146.63	78	0	5	65	14
Stephen Moore	Lancashire Lightning	522	17	34.80	133.16	76	0	4	53	13
Marcus Trescothick	Somerset	507	16	39.00	162.50	108*	1	3	65	19
Azhar Mahmood	Kent Spitfires	485	14	40.41	143.91	106*	1	3	50	12

=== Highest scores ===
This table contains the top five highest scores of the season made by a batsman in a single innings.

Player	Team	Score	Balls	4s	6s	Opponent	Ground
Kevin O'Brien	Gloucestershire Gladiators	119	52	7	11	Middlesex Panthers	Uxbridge Cricket Club Ground
Marcus Trescothick	Somerset	108*	61	12	5	Essex Eagles	County Ground, Chelmsford
Azhar Mahmood	Kent Spitfires	106*	57	13	3	Gloucestershire Gladiators	Kent County Cricket Ground, Beckenham
Hamish Marshall	Gloucestershire Gladiators	102	54	11	4	Middlesex Panthers	County Ground, Chelmsford
Murray Goodwin	Sussex Sharks	100*	59	9	3	Surrey Lions	County Ground, Hove

=== Most wickets ===
The following table contains the five leading wicket-takers of the season.

Player	Team	Wkts	Mts	Ave	S/R	Econ	BBI
Tim Phillips	Essex Eagles	26	15	13.23	11.3	7.02	4/22
Danny Briggs	Hampshire Royals	23	16	14.91	13.0	6.83	5/19
Harry Gurney	Leicestershire Foxes	23	14	15.39	13.0	7.10	3/25
Darren Pattinson	Nottinghamshire Outlaws	23	16	17.39	12.8	8.13	5/25
Tim Southee	Essex Eagles	22	15	18.95	14.1	8.01	6/16

=== Best bowling figures ===
This table lists the top five players with the best bowling figures in the season.

Player	Team	Overs	Figures	Opponent	Ground
Arul Suppiah	Somerset	3.4	6/5	Glamorgan Dragons	Sophia Gardens, Cardiff
Tim Southee	Essex Eagles	4.0	6/16	Glamorgan Dragons	County Ground, Chelmsford
Paul Collingwood	Durham Dynamos	3.0	5/6	Northamptonshire Steelbacks	Riverside Ground, Chester-le-Street
Rich Pyrah	Yorkshire Carnegie	4.0	5/16	Durham Dynamos	North Marine Road Ground, Scarborough
Naved-ul-Hasan	Sussex Sharks	3.1	5/17	Essex Eagles	County Ground, Hove
