= Russell Spiers =

English cricketer (born 1962)

Personal information
- Full name: Russell Anthony Spiers
- Born: 10 July 1962 (age 64); Leicester, Leicestershire, England
- Batting: Right-handed
- Bowling: Slow left-arm orthodox
- Relatives: Russell Cobb (brother-in-law); Josh Cobb (nephew)

Domestic team information
- Years: Team
- 1991–1994: Staffordshire

Career statistics
Competition	List A
Matches	3
Runs scored	22
Batting average	22.00
100s/50s	0/0
Top score	13*
Balls bowled	144
Wickets	0
Bowling average	–
5 wickets in innings	–
10 wickets in match	–
Best bowling	–
Catches/stumpings	0/–
- Source: Cricinfo, 15 June 2011

Russell Anthony Spiers (born 10 July 1962) is a former English cricketer. Spiers was a right-handed batsman who bowled slow left-arm orthodox. He was born in Leicester, Leicestershire.

Spiers made his debut for Staffordshire in the 1991 MCCA Knockout Trophy against Oxfordshire. Spiers played Minor counties cricket for Staffordshire from 1991 to 1994, which included 21 Minor Counties Championship matches and 12 MCCA Knockout Trophy matches. In 1991, he made his List A debut against Northamptonshire in the NatWest Trophy. He made 2 further List A appearances, against Hampshire in the 1993 NatWest Trophy and Surrey in the 1994 NatWest Trophy. In his 3 List A matches, he scored 22 runs, and bowled a total of 24 overs, though without taking a wicket.

Spiers' brother-in-law Russell Cobb and nephew Josh Cobb both played first-class cricket.
