= Alex Jones (cricketer) =

Welsh cricketer (born 1988)

Personal information
- Full name: Alexander John Jones
- Born: 12 November 1988 (age 38); Bridgend, Glamorgan, Wales
- Nickname: AJ
- Batting: Right-handed
- Bowling: Left-arm medium

Domestic team information
- Years: Team
- 2007–2013: Wales Minor Counties
- 2010–2013: Glamorgan (squad no. 27)

Career statistics
Competition	FC	LA	T20
Matches	3	6	18
Runs scored	39	9	9
Batting average	13.00	4.50	3.00
100s/50s	0/0	0/0	0/0
Top score	26	5	4*
Balls bowled	288	204	216
Wickets	2	5	16
Bowling average	105.50	51.80	18.18
5 wickets in innings	0	0	0
10 wickets in match	0	0	0
Best bowling	1/50	1/26	3/16
Catches/stumpings	2/–	4/–	4/–
- Source: Cricinfo, 29 September 2013

Alexander John Jones (born 10 November 1988) is a Welsh cricketer. Jones is a right-handed batsman who bowls left-arm medium pace. He was born at Bridgend, Glamorgan and educated at Cowbridge Comprehensive School.

Jones first appeared in county cricket for Wales Minor Counties against Oxfordshire in the 2007 Minor Counties Championship, while the following season he played his first match in the MCCA Knockout Trophy against Dorset. In 2009, while studying for his degree in Sport and Physical Education at Cardiff Metropolitan University, Jones played for Cardiff UCCE against county sides; however, the matches were not rated as first-class.

Having been a part of Glamorgan's Academy since 2005, he eventually made his first team debut for the county in a List A match against Somerset in the 2010 Clydesdale Bank 40. The following season he made further List A appearances, as well as making his first-class debut against Surrey in the County Championship. It was not in List A or first-class cricket that he had success in during the 2011 season, but in Twenty20 cricket instead. Making his debut in that format against Middlesex, he went on to take 15 wickets in the 2011 Friends Provident t20, which came at 17.06 apiece with best figures of 3/16.

Jones was released by Glamorgan after the expiry of his contract at the end of the 2013 season, after making only one county championship appearance in two years.

== Career best performances ==
	Batting				Bowling (innings)			
	Score	Fixture	Venue	Season	Figures	Fixture	Venue	Season
First-class	26	Glamorgan v Northamptonshire	Northampton	2011	1/50	Glamorgan v Surrey	The Oval	2011
LA	5	Glamorgan v Somerset	Taunton	2010	1/26	Glamorgan v Leicestershire	Leicester	2013
T20	4 not out	Glamorgan v Somerset	Taunton	2011	3/16	Glamorgan v Middlesex	Cardiff	2011
