= English cricket team in the West Indies in 2013–14 =

International cricket tour

	England	West Indies
- Dates: 25 February 2014 – 13 March 2014
Captains	Stuart Broad	Dwayne Bravo (ODIs); Daren Sammy (T20Is)

One Day International series
- Results: England won the 3-match series 2–1
Most runs	Joe Root (167)	Lendl Simmons (151)
Most wickets	Tim Bresnan (7)	Dwayne Bravo (6)
- Player of the series: Joe Root (Eng)

Twenty20 International series
- Results: West Indies won the 3-match series 2–1
Most runs	Michael Lumb (85)	Marlon Samuels (112)
Most wickets	Ravi Bopara (5)	Krishmar Santokie (6)
- Player of the series: Daren Sammy (WI)

The England cricket team toured the West Indies from 25 February to 13 March 2014, playing a three-match One Day International series and three T20I matches against the West Indies team. England won the ODI series 2–1, with the West Indies winning the T20 series by the same score.

In the third ODI, England batsman Joe Root broke his right thumb when he was hit by the third ball of his innings, but went on to make a century; the injury was serious enough for him to be ruled out of the T20I series. England captain Stuart Broad injured his knee in the first T20 match, and Eoin Morgan captained the squad for the remaining games.

== Squads ==
ODIs		T20Is	
West Indies	England	West Indies	England
Dwayne Bravo (c); Darren Bravo; Kirk Edwards; Jason Holder; Nikita Miller; Sunil Narine; Kieran Powell; Denesh Ramdin (wk); Ravi Rampaul; Daren Sammy; Marlon Samuels; Lendl Simmons; Dwayne Smith	Stuart Broad (c); Eoin Morgan (vc); Moeen Ali; Ravi Bopara; Tim Bresnan; Jos Buttler (wk); Jade Dernbach; Harry Gurney; Alex Hales; Chris Jordan; Michael Lumb; Stephen Parry; Joe Root; Ben Stokes; James Tredwell; Luke Wright	Daren Sammy (c); Dwayne Bravo (vc); Samuel Badree; Johnson Charles (wk); Sheldon Cottrell; Andre Fletcher; Chris Gayle; Sunil Narine; Denesh Ramdin (wk); Ravi Rampaul; Andre Russell; Marlon Samuels; Krishmar Santokie; Lendl Simmons; Dwayne Smith	Stuart Broad (c); Eoin Morgan (vc); Moeen Ali; Ravi Bopara; Tim Bresnan; Jos Buttler (wk); Jade Dernbach; Harry Gurney; Alex Hales; Chris Jordan; Michael Lumb; Stephen Parry; Joe Root; Ben Stokes; James Tredwell; Luke Wright

== Tour matches ==
=== UWI Vice Chancellor's XI vs England XI ===
25 February 2014
09:30
Scorecard

England XI; 290/8 (50 overs)	v	UWI Vice Chancellor's XI; 261/7 (50 overs)
Joe Root 104* (104); Akeem Dewar 3/67 (10 overs)		Kyle Corbin 105 (102); James Tredwell 3/39 (9 overs)

England XI won by 29 runs
Sir Vivian Richards Stadium, Antigua
Umpires: Bernard Joseph (WI) and Carl Tuckett (WI)

- UWI Vice Chancellor's XI won the toss and elected to field.

== ODI series ==
=== 1st ODI ===
28 February 2014
09:30
Scorecard

West Indies; 269/6 (50 overs)	v	England; 254/6 (50 overs)
Dwayne Bravo 87* (91); Tim Bresnan 3/68 (10 overs)		Michael Lumb 106 (117); Sunil Narine 2/36 (10 overs)

West Indies won by 15 runs
Sir Vivian Richards Stadium, Antigua
Umpires: Gregory Brathwaite (WI) and Marais Erasmus (SA)
Player of the match: Dwayne Bravo (WI)

- England won the toss and elected to field.
- Moeen Ali and Michael Lumb (both Eng) made their ODI debuts.
- Lumb's century was the highest score on debut in an ODI for England.

=== 2nd ODI ===
2 March 2014
09:30
Scorecard

West Indies; 159 (44.2 overs)	v	England; 163/7 (44.5 overs)
Lendl Simmons 70 (98); Stephen Parry 3/32 (10 overs)		Michael Lumb 39 (60); Nikita Miller 2/28 (10 overs)

England won by 3 wickets
Sir Vivian Richards Stadium, Antigua
Umpires: Rod Tucker (Aus) and Joel Wilson (WI)
Player of the match: Stephen Parry (Eng)

- England won the toss and elected to field.
- Stephen Parry (Eng) made his ODI debut.

=== 3rd ODI ===
5 March 2014
09:30
Scorecard

England; 303/6 (50 overs)	v	West Indies; 278 (47.4 overs)
Joe Root 107 (122); Dwayne Bravo 3/60 (10 overs)		Denesh Ramdin 128 (109); Tim Bresnan 3/45 (8.4 overs)

England won by 25 runs
Sir Vivian Richards Stadium, Antigua
Umpires: Marais Erasmus (SA) and Joel Wilson (WI)
Player of the match: Joe Root (Eng)

- West Indies won the toss and elected to field.
- Rain interrupted the England innings, but with no loss of overs.
- Joe Root (Eng) scored his maiden century in ODIs.

== T20I series ==
=== 1st T20I ===
9 March 2014
14:30
Scorecard

West Indies; 170/3 (20 overs)	v	England; 143/9 (20 overs)
Marlon Samuels 69* (46); Ravi Bopara 2/23 (4 overs)		Tim Bresnan 47* (29); Samuel Badree 3/17 (4 overs)

West Indies won by 27 runs
Kensington Oval, Bridgetown, Barbados
Umpires: Peter Nero (WI) and Joel Wilson (WI)
Player of the match: Marlon Samuels (WI)

- West Indies won the toss and elected to bat.

=== 2nd T20I ===
11 March 2014
14:30
Scorecard

England; 152/7 (20 overs)	v	West Indies; 155/5 (18.5 overs)
Jos Buttler 67 (43); Krishmar Santokie 4/21 (4 overs)		Chris Gayle 36 (30); Tim Bresnan 2/51 (3.5 overs)

West Indies won by 5 wickets
Kensington Oval, Bridgetown, Barbados
Umpires: Gregory Brathwaite (WI) and Peter Nero (WI)
Player of the match: Krishmar Santokie (WI)

- England won the toss and elected to bat.
- Rain stopped play for 45 minutes after 14.3 overs of the England innings, but no overs were lost.
- Moeen Ali and Stephen Parry (both Eng) made their T20I debuts.

=== 3rd T20I ===
13 March 2014
14:30
Scorecard

England; 165/6 (20 overs)	v	West Indies; 160/7 (20 overs)
Michael Lumb 63 (40); Krishmar Santokie 2/27 (4 overs)		Lendl Simmons 69 (55); Chris Jordan 3/39 (4 overs)

England won by 5 runs
Kensington Oval, Bridgetown, Barbados
Umpires: Gregory Brathwaite (WI) and Joel Wilson (WI)
Player of the match: Chris Jordan (Eng)

- England won the toss and elected to bat.
- Sheldon Cottrell (WI) made his T20I debut.
