= Josh Cobb =

English cricketer (born 1990)

Joshua Cobb
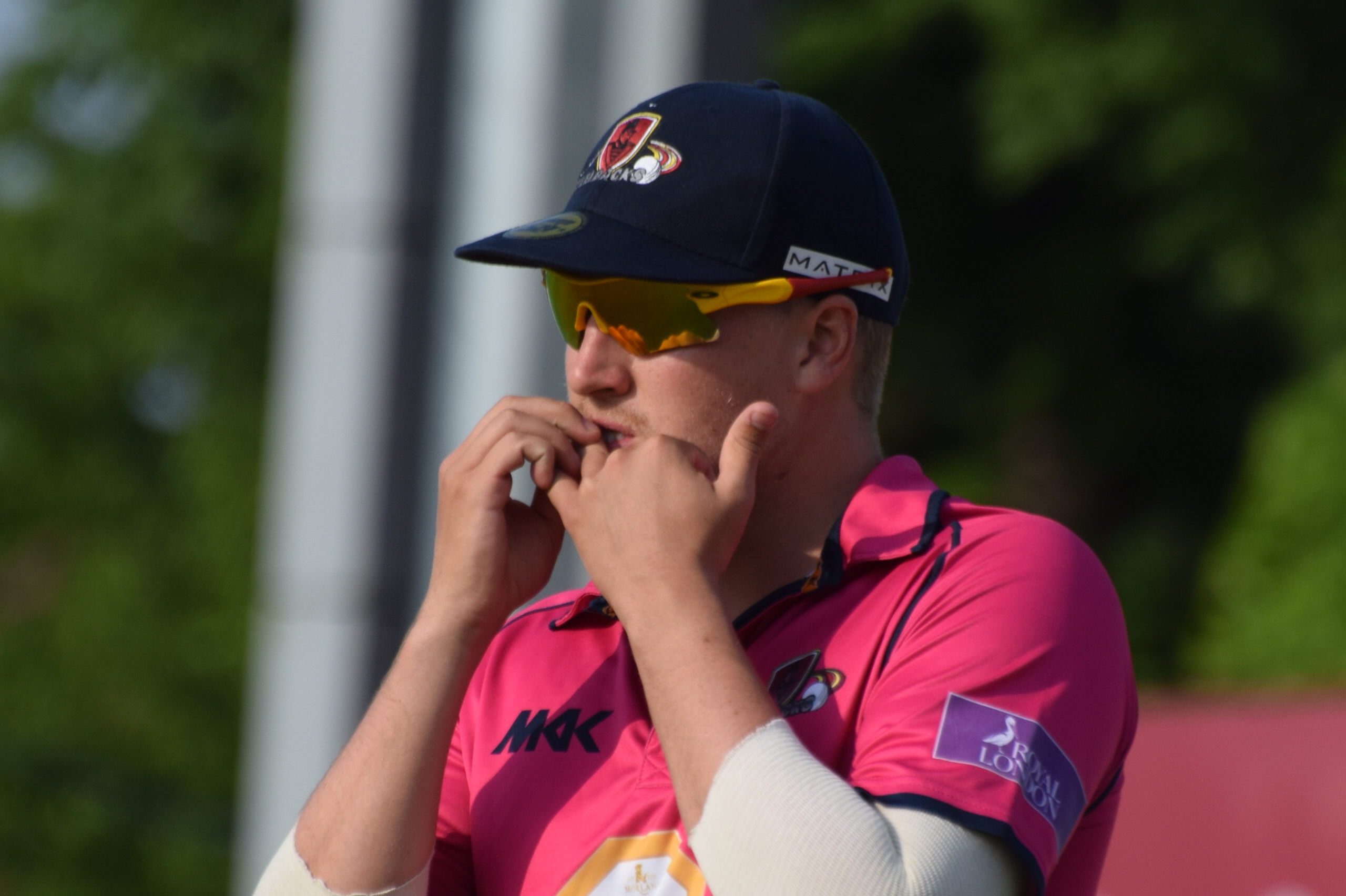
- Cobb in 2016

Personal information
- Full name: Joshua James Cobb
- Born: 17 August 1990 (age 36); Leicester, Leicestershire, England
- Batting: Right-handed
- Bowling: Right-arm off break
- Relatives: Russell Cobb (father); Russell Spiers (uncle)

Domestic team information
- Years: Team
- 2007–2014: Leicestershire
- 2012/13: Dhaka Gladiators
- 2013/14: Prime Doleshwar Sporting Club
- 2013/14: Central Districts
- 2015–2023: Northamptonshire (squad no. 4)
- 2015: Sylhet Super Stars
- 2016: Barisal Bulls
- 2021–2022: Welsh Fire
- 2024: Worcestershire
- 2024: Norfolk
- FC debut: 5 September 2007 Leicestershire v Northants
- LA debut: 10 August 2008 Leicestershire v Glamorgan

Career statistics
Competition	FC	LA	T20
Matches	138	100	210
Runs scored	5,552	3,338	4,262
Batting average	25.94	37.93	23.81
100s/50s	4/32	7/21	1/25
Top score	148*	146*	103
Balls bowled	2,840	1,758	1,934
Wickets	20	35	78
Bowling average	84.35	48.91	32.43
5 wickets in innings	0	0	1
10 wickets in match	0	0	0
Best bowling	2/11	3/34	5/25
Catches/stumpings	59/–	29/–	98/–
- Source: ESPNcricinfo, 19 August 2024

Joshua James Cobb (born 17 August 1990) is an English former cricket player and now coach. He was a top order batsmen and occasional off-spinner. He was man of the match in the 2011 and 2016 Twenty20 finals.

== Career ==
Cobb scored a double century for the England Under 19s. He attended Oakham School as a child, where he was a key member of the first team, averaging over 50 with the bat in his final season.

Cobb made his first team debut in 2007, aged just 17, but gained a regular place in 2008 when he scored 148 not out against Middlesex County Cricket Club at Lord's Cricket Ground, an innings which made him Leicestershire's youngest ever centurion. He is also an off spin bowler. He came to prominence at the 2011 Friends Life t20 Final against Somerset, where he won the man of the match award after scoring a crucial quick fire 18 and then taking a career best 4–22 to help restrict Somerset to 127–9 giving the Foxes the Cup by a total of 18 runs.

In July 2012, Cobb was named captain of Leicestershire's limited overs side, succeeding Matthew Hoggard. In 2013 he was named vice-captain to Ramnaresh Sarwan for Leicester's County Championship campaign.

In 2013 Cobb signed for the Dhaka Gladiators in the Bangladesh Premier League tournament.

He signed for Northants ahead of the 2015 season, and played an important part in their progress to the semifinal of the Twenty20 competition, as well as playing in all 16 of their County Championship matches.

The following year his first-class appearances were limited by a knee injury, but he played an important role in winning the Twenty20 title. He scored 80 off just 48 balls, as part of a 120 run fourth wicket partnership with Alex Wakely. For this he won the man of the match award in the final for the second time, the previous being with Leicestershire in 2011. Shortly before finals day, it was announced that Cobb had signed a three-year contract to continue playing for Northants.

In 2021, he was bought by the Welsh Fire in The Hundred. In the 2022 season, he was appointed captain of the team after Jonny Bairstow pulled out of the competition.

Cobb signed for National Counties team Norfolk as their professional player for the summer of 2024. During the season he also signed a white-ball contract with Worcestershire and made 13 appearances.

In March 2025, Cobb joined Warwickshire as the club's Boys Academy Lead and subsequently announced his retirement as a player.

== Personal life ==
Cobb was born at Leicester in 1990. He was educated at Bosworth Community College in Desford and at Oakham School. His father, Russell Cobb, played for Leicestershire in the 1980s. His uncle, Russell Spiers, played Minor Counties and List A cricket for Staffordshire in the early 1990s and his grandfather, Alan Cobb, played Second Xi cricket for Leicestershire between 1967 and 1972.
