= Steffan Piolet =

English cricketer

Personal information
- Full name: Steffan Andrew Piolet
- Born: 8 August 1988 (age 38); Redhill, Surrey, England
- Batting: Right-handed
- Bowling: Right-arm medium
- Role: All-rounder

Domestic team information
- Years: Team
- 2006–2008: Sussex
- 2009–2013: Warwickshire
- 2013: → Sussex (on loan)
- 2014–2015: Sussex
- FC debut: 11 June 2009 Warwickshire v Durham UCCE
- Last FC: 15 August 2014 Sussex v Yorkshire
- LA debut: 19 April 2009 Warwickshire v Somerset
- Last LA: 5 August 2015 Sussex v Glamorgan

Career statistics
Competition	FC	LA	T20
Matches	11	42	69
Runs scored	361	328	195
Batting average	21.23	17.26	11.47
100s/50s	1/0	0/1	0/0
Top score	103*	63*	26*
Balls bowled	985	1,475	1,341
Wickets	19	40	60
Bowling average	30.00	34.07	26.50
5 wickets in innings	1	0	0
10 wickets in match	1	0	0
Best bowling	6/17	4/31	3/14
Catches/stumpings	8/–	6/–	18/–
- Source: CricketArchive, 29 September 2017

Steffan Andrew Piolet (born 8 August 1988) is an English cricketer. He specialises in short format cricket and is a right-handed batsman and right-arm medium-pace bowler who played over 100 matches for Sussex and Warwickshire County Cricket Clubs

Piolet was born in Redhill and is of Norwegian descent. He attended the University of Wales Institute Cardiff shortly before leaving to concentrate fully on his cricket career. He attended Harlands Primary School, Warden Park School and Central Sussex College.

Having represented Sussex, Worcestershire, and Warwickshire in Second XI cricket, Piolet made his List A debut during the 2009 season, against Somerset, during the 2009 Friends Provident Trophy. He scored two runs and took bowling figures of 0/28 from six overs. Piolet's first-class debut came in June 2009 against Durham UCCE at The Racecourse ground in Durham. Piolet had an excellent game with the ball, taking ten wickets: 6/17 in the first innings and 4/26 in the second.
