= Stephen Parry (cricketer) =

English cricketer (born 1986)

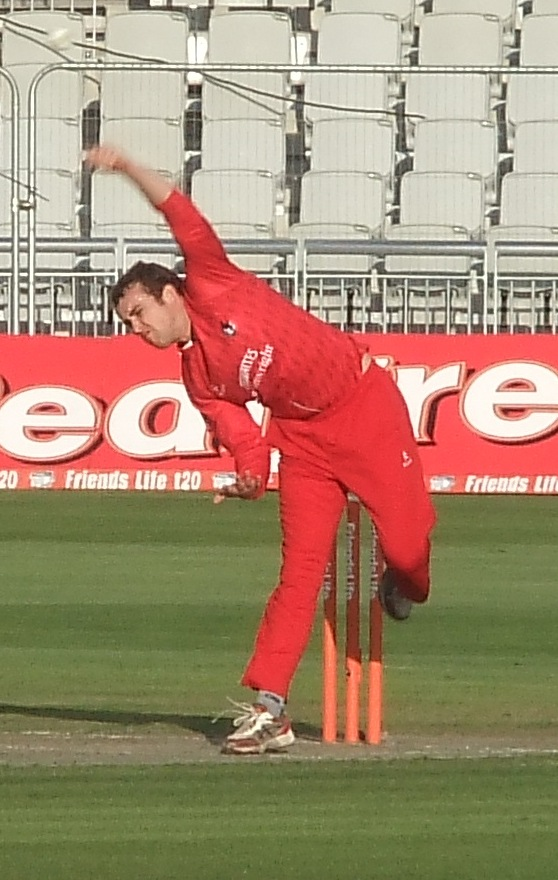

Personal information
- Full name: Stephen David Parry
- Born: 12 January 1986 (age 40); Manchester, England
- Height: 6 ft 0 in (1.83 m)
- Batting: Right-handed
- Bowling: Slow left arm orthodox
- Role: Bowler

International information
- National side: England
- ODI debut (cap 234): 2 March 2014 v West Indies
- Last ODI: 5 March 2014 v West Indies
- ODI shirt no.: 73
- T20I debut (cap 67): 11 March 2014 v West Indies
- Last T20I: 27 November 2015 v Pakistan
- T20I shirt no.: 12

Domestic team information
- Years: Team
- 2007–2020: Lancashire (squad no. 4)
- 2014/15: Brisbane Heat

Career statistics
| Competition | ODI | T20I | FC | LA |
|---|---|---|---|---|
| Matches | 2 | 5 | 28 | 96 |
| Runs scored | – | 1 | 456 | 342 |
| Batting average | – | 1.00 | 14.25 | 12.21 |
| 100s/50s | – | 0/0 | 0/0 | 0/0 |
| Top score | – | 1 | 44 | 31 |
| Balls bowled | 114 | 96 | 4,301 | 4,162 |
| Wickets | 4 | 3 | 58 | 116 |
| Bowling average | 23.00 | 46.00 | 33.20 | 30.04 |
| 5 wickets in innings | 0 | 0 | 2 | 1 |
| 10 wickets in match | 0 | 0 | 0 | 0 |
| Best bowling | 3/32 | 2/33 | 5/23 | 5/17 |
| Catches/stumpings | 0/– | 2/– | 7/– | 32/– |
- Source: Cricinfo, 20 August 2019

Stephen David Parry (born 12 January 1986) is an English cricketer. He is a right-handed batsman and a slow left-arm bowler who played for Lancashire County Cricket Club. Parry made his senior debut for Lancashire in 2007 and in 2009 was named Lancashire's Young Player of the Year.

From 2008 to 2012 Lancashire had two other left-arm orthodox spinners in their squad, with Parry competing with them for places in the team. Parry became established in Lancashire's limited overs teams, though played less frequently for the first-class side. Having previously represented England Lions, Parry made his One Day International debut against the West Indies in March 2014, and played his first Twenty20 International against the same opponents later that month.

== Domestic career ==
Parry made two appearances in the 2005 Minor Counties Championship season, as well as appearing in the MCCA Trophy for Cumberland, and was both his league's Player of the Season and Bowler of the Season in helping his club Northern to their ECB Premier League championship success of that year.

In the second innings of Parry's debut first-class match, against Durham UCCE in April 2007, he picked up five wickets, including that of former Derbyshire squad-member Christopher Paget, though he did not contribute with the bat. At the end of the 2009 season, Parry was named Lancashire's Young Player of the Year.

In April 2010, immediately before the start of the English cricket season, Lancashire's experienced and established spinner, Gary Keedy, suffered a broken collar bone. With several months on the sidelines, Keedy's absence gave the opportunity to young spinners Parry and Simon Kerrigan to play first-team cricket. Lancashire coach Peter Moores said "We're lucky in some ways in that we've got Stephen Parry, who played quite a lot of first-team cricket last season, but we've also got Simon Kerrigan, who bowled beautifully to take six wickets in the pre-season game against Yorkshire in Barbados and we could also use Steven Crofty's off-spin". Kerrigan was chosen ahead of Parry in the four-day team and cemented his place in the side. However, following a string of impressive twenty20 performances for Lancashire Lightning during the 2010 season, Parry was called up to the England Lions squad for their triangular series with India A and West Indies A. At the time of his selection, he was Lancashire's leading wicket-taker in the 2010 Friends Provident t20, and he finished as the competition's fourth-highest wicket-taker in 2010. He made his debut for the Lions on 8 July in their victory over India A; Parry took three wickets in the match.

Parry bowling in a twenty20 match against Durham in 2012

As in the previous year, Parry was unable to break into Lancashire's team in the 2011 County Championship, but was a regular in the list A and twenty20 sides, playing 12 and 17 matches in the respective formats. His 13 list A wickets cost on average 32.30 runs each, while his 17 twenty20 wickets came at 24.94 runs apiece. Speaking in 2011, Gary Keedy explained that he is concerned that spin bowlers who learn how to bowl in the one-day format before playing first-class cricket will not become as effective bowlers as those who transition the other way round. He remarked that Parry "is a very fine one-day bowler but I think he takes more pride in bowling a maiden than he does bowling somebody out." Parry spent that December with the England Performance Programme Squad, and coach Peter Moores noted "when he worked with the England Performance Programme Squad ... they measured the amount of spin he was getting on the ball and it was as high as almost anybody they had worked with."

While Parry was a regular feature in Lancashire's limited overs teams in 2012, Keedy and Kerrigan again shared spin bowling duties for the first-class side. In the hope of getting more exposure at first-class level, Parry considered moving to another club though eventually decided to remain at Lancashire. At the end of the 2012 season Keedy left to join Surrey to give Lancashire's younger spinners more opportunities. During the YB40 in May Parry recorded figures of 5 wickets for 17 runs, the second-best return for a Lancashire spinner in List A cricket (second only to David Hughes' 6 for 29 in 1977). The 2013 season saw Parry play three first-class matches for Lancashire, his first since 2009.

Parry was instrumental in Lancashire's 2015 t20 Blast triumph with 25 wickets in the tournament at an average of 15. The following year he recorded his best T20 figures and the best by any bowler at Old Trafford with a haul of 5 for 13 against Worcestershire as the Rapids were dismissed for just 53

He was released by Lancashire in November 2020.

== International career ==
In February 2014, Parry was named in England's squad for the limited-overs series in West Indies and the ICC World Twenty20 in Bangladesh. On his debut he took 3 for 32 and was man of the match, in England's win in the second ODI against West Indies. He followed this up with figures of 1-60, as England won by 25 runs. He played in the second T20 match between the two sides, taking figures of 0–17 in two overs as the West Indies won by five wickets. In the next match he took figures of 0-32 from his four overs.

Parry was part of the England squad for the 2014 T20 World Cup. He only played in one game, against the Netherlands, which England lost by 45 runs. He bowled two overs and finished with figures of 0-23, and was run out for one when batting.

In November 2015, Parry was named in the England squad for the T20 series against Pakistan in the UAE. He played in the first 2 matches of the series, taking 2 for 33 in the first match and 1 for 33 in the second match.
