= Michael Lumb (cricketer) =

English cricketer

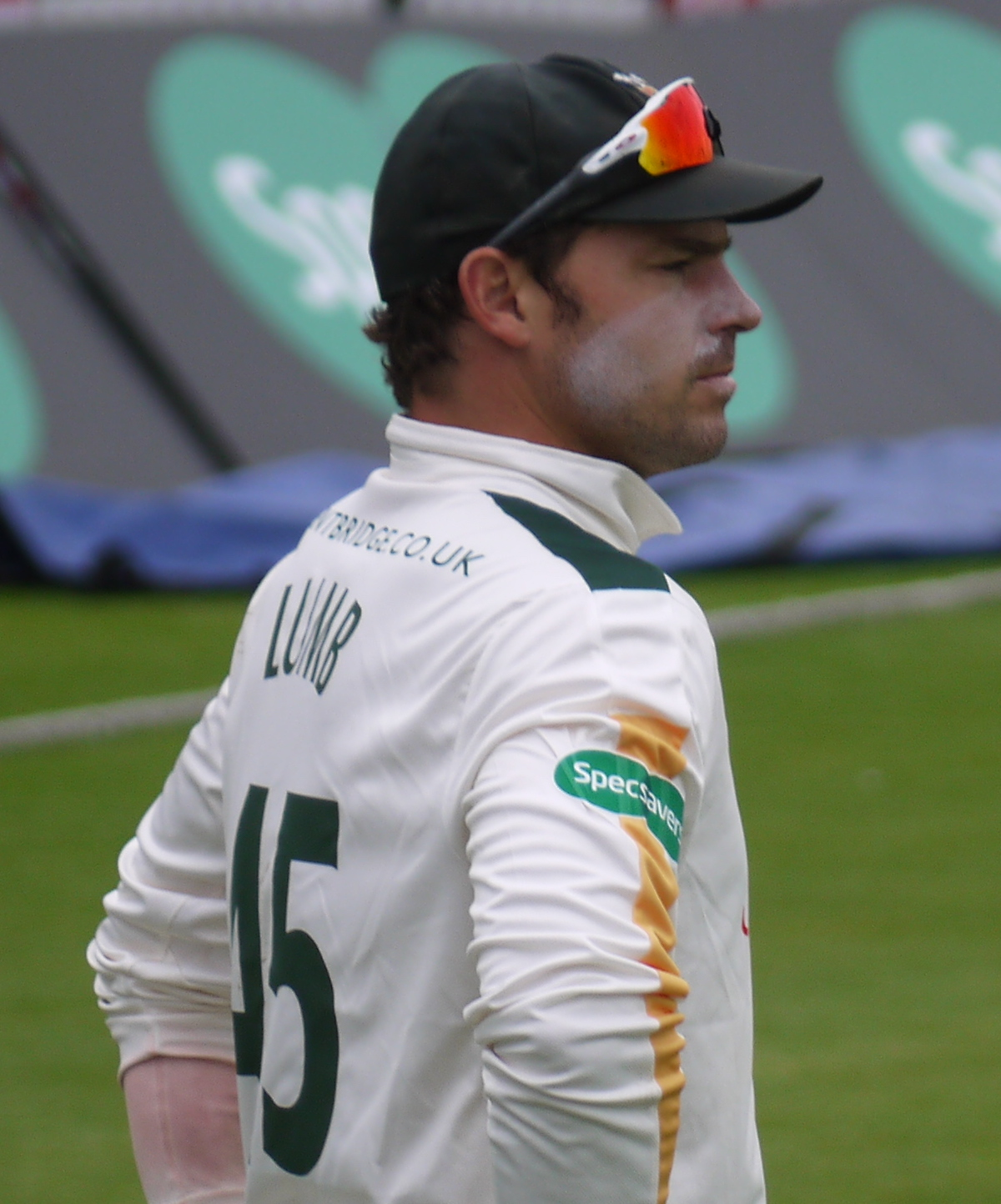

Personal information
- Full name: Michael John Lumb
- Born: 12 February 1980 (age 46); Johannesburg, Transvaal Province, South Africa
- Nickname: Lumby, Joe
- Height: 6 ft 0 in (1.83 m)
- Batting: Left-handed
- Bowling: Right-arm medium

International information
- National side: England (2010-2014)
- ODI debut (cap 233): 28 February 2014 v West Indies
- Last ODI: 5 March 2014 v West Indies
- ODI shirt no.: 45
- T20I debut (cap 50): 3 May 2010 v West Indies
- Last T20I: 31 March 2014 v Netherlands
- T20I shirt no.: 45

Domestic team information
- Years: Team
- 2000–2006: Yorkshire
- 2007–2011: Hampshire
- 2010: Rajasthan Royals
- 2011: Queensland
- 2011: Deccan Chargers
- 2011–2017: Sydney Sixers
- 2012–2017: Nottinghamshire (squad no. 45)

Career statistics
Competition	ODI	T20I	FC	LA
Matches	3	27	210	221
Runs scored	165	552	11,443	6,623
Batting average	55.00	21.23	34.26	32.78
100s/50s	1/0	0/3	21/58	8/44
Top score	106	63	221*	184
Balls bowled	–	–	342	12
Wickets	–	–	6	0
Bowling average	–	–	43.33	–
5 wickets in innings	–	–	0	–
10 wickets in match	–	–	0	–
Best bowling	–	–	2/10	–
Catches/stumpings	1/–	8/–	118/–	72/–
- Source: ESPNcricinfo, 19 June 2017

Michael John Lumb (born 12 February 1980) is a former South African-born English cricketer, who played for Yorkshire, Hampshire, and Nottinghamshire at county level and England in Twenty20 International cricket and One Day International cricket. Born and raised in South Africa, Lumb is a left-handed opening batsman and a right-arm medium pace bowler. He became only the second cricketer after Dennis Amiss to score a century on ODI debut for England and ninth player overall to do so. Lumb was a member of the England team that won the 2010 ICC World Twenty20.

== Early life and domestic career ==
The son of prolific Yorkshire opener Richard Lumb, Lumb was born in South Africa and was educated at Montrose Primary, then St Stithians College in Johannesburg. He was in the South Africa national under-19 cricket team squad for the 1998 Under-19 Cricket World Cup. Lumb made his way through the junior teams in Transvaal before returning to his roots to play for Yorkshire. A hard-hitting batsman, Lumb made his county debut in 2000, scoring 66 not out against the touring Zimbabweans. A knee injury in 2001 meant that Lumb played only a small part in Yorkshire's success in winning the County Championship that year, although he did record a maiden first-class hundred against Leicestershire. In doing so, Lumb became part of only the fourth father-and-son pair to score centuries for Yorkshire.

Lumb made progress in 2002 by becoming a regular member of both the championship and limited-overs sides and, in 2003, scored close to a thousand first-class runs at an average of over 40, including two centuries and six fifties. He was selected for the ECB National Academy squad the following winter, but failed to kick on as people expected and was dropped by Yorkshire during the 2005 season. He averaged in the middle-thirties for the 2005 and 2006 seasons, with a top score of 144 in 2006 but, at the end of the season, decided against renewing his contract and moved to Hampshire for the 2007 County Championship.

In July 2009, some good form for Hampshire, particularly when opening the batting in the One-Day and Twenty20 games, led for his inclusion in the England Cricket Team's provisional 30-man squad for the 2009 ICC Champions Trophy taking place in South Africa during September 2009.

Hampshire progressed to the Friends Provident Trophy final in 2009 and Lumb shared in a 93 run opening partnership with James Adams against Sussex as Hampshire forged a six wicket win at Lord's Cricket Ground. In the semi-final Lumb had also impressed scoring 76 against Lancashire as he and Adams put on over 150 for the first wicket. Lumb made his highest first-class score against Nottinghamshire during a 2009 County Championship game, making 219 runs in Hampshire's first innings.

Lumb was signed by former Hampshire teammate Shane Warne to play for the Rajasthan Royals in the 2010 Indian Premier League, in a deal worth a reported £30,000. For the season of IPL 2011, Lumb was picked up by Deccan Chargers.

On 10 November 2010, Lumb agreed to terms with the Queensland Bulls to play in the 2010/11 KFC Big Bash season.

On 22 July 2011, Lumb signed with the Sydney Sixers for Australia's Big Bash League as one of their two allowed overseas players He was part of the Sixers' squad that won the 2012 Champions League Twenty20. Lumb scored an unbeaten 82 in the final and was named man of the match.

It was announced on 10 August 2011, that Lumb would join Nottinghamshire County Cricket Club from the 2012 season, on a 3-year deal.

== International career ==
Lumb was selected in England's fifteen man squad for the 2010 ICC World Twenty20 held in the West Indies. He made his Twenty20 International debut against the West Indies, where opening the innings, he hit a quickfire 28 before being bowled by Chris Gayle. Lumb played in all of England's seven matches in the tournament, where he helped to form a fast-paced opening partnership with Craig Kieswetter. Lumb scored 137 runs in the tournament at a batting average of 19.57 and a high score of 33. Lumb ended on a high note by collecting a winners medal, as England defeated Australia by seven wickets to win the tournament. During the match, he ran out David Warner and scored two runs with the bat off four deliveries. He scored a match winning 50 against India on the second of two games and proved that he deserved a place in the England team.

Lumb made his ODI debut against the West Indies on 28 February 2014, where he scored a century. By doing so he become the oldest player to score a hundred on his ODI debut. In the same tour, he scored his highest T20 score and a few months later, was part of England's 2014 ICC Twenty World Cup squad in Bangladesh, playing in all of England's matches.

== Retirement ==
In July 2017, Lumb was forced to retire from cricket due to an ankle injury.
