= Gary Keedy =

English cricketer (born 1974)

Personal information
- Born: 27 November 1974 (age 51); Sandal, West Yorkshire, England
- Nickname: Keeds
- Height: 5 ft 11 in (1.80 m)
- Batting: Left-handed
- Bowling: Slow left arm orthodox
- Role: Bowler

Domestic team information
- Years: Team
- 1994: Yorkshire
- 1995–2012: Lancashire
- 2012: Sylhet Royals
- 2013: Surrey
- 2014–2015: Nottinghamshire

Career statistics
Competition	FC	LA	T20
Matches	227	97	71
Runs scored	1,448	161	27
Batting average	10.80	8.94	5.40
100s/50s	0/2	0/0	0/0
Top score	64	33	9*
Balls bowled	46,471	3,936	1,414
Wickets	696	119	72
Bowling average	31.39	26.47	21.40
5 wickets in innings	35	2	0
10 wickets in match	7	0	0
Best bowling	7/68	5/30	4/15
Catches/stumpings	57/–	14/–	10/–
- Source: ESPNcricinfo, 12 September 2015

Gary Keedy (born 27 November 1974) is a retired English cricketer. A slow-left arm spin bowler, he played one match for Yorkshire in 1994, having graduated from their cricket academy, before moving to Lancashire in 1995. He played for the club until 2012 taking over 500 first-class wickets. Although he had played youth internationals, he never played for the senior England team, although he was named in the squad a few times. In 2011 he was part of the Lancashire squad that won the County Championship for the first time since 1950. Keedy subsequently played one season for Surrey and two for Nottinghamshire before retiring as a professional cricketer in 2015. After studying physiotherapy at the University of Salford, he is currently Nottinghamshire's spin bowling coach and assistant physiotherapist.

== Early life ==
He attended Garforth Comprehensive School.

== Career ==
=== Youth cricket ===
Although Keedy never played for the England test or one-day senior team, between 1993 and 1994 he played 8 youth test matches taking 16 wickets at an average of 38.87 including the scalps of Shivnarine Chanderpaul and Thilan Samaraweera. In the same period, he also played 6 youth ODIs, claiming 8 wickets at 16.37.

Keedy graduated from the Yorkshire Cricket Academy and played only one match for Yorkshire before moving to Roses rivals Lancashire in the winter of 1994/5.

=== Lancashire ===
Keedy was signed by Lancashire's then-coach David Lloyd in a motorway service station. Although it took time for him to become a leading light of the Lancashire attack, he was awarded his county cap in 2000. It was in 2003 that Keedy first started to impress observers, taking sixty wickets in the County Championship as Lancashire narrowly missed out on their first Championship title since 1934 to Sussex. Since then he has remained on the periphery of England selection. He was considered unlucky not to win a place to tour Sri Lanka in 2003–4. The selectors chose Glamorgan's Robert Croft instead.

In 2004, Keedy enjoyed the most successful season of his career so far, taking 72 Championship wickets, making him the leading first-class wicket-taker amongst England qualified players. Only Pakistan international Mushtaq Ahmed of Sussex took more first-class wickets. Unfortunately for him, Lancashire were relegated to Division Two of the Championship despite being favourites for the title. As a result of his bowling efforts during the 2004 season, Keedy was awarded Lancashire's Player of the Year Award.

He again missed out on selection to tour with England, this time to South Africa, in favour of the more conservative pick of Gareth Batty.

After taking 29 Championship wickets in 2005, Keedy suffered a finger injury on his spinning finger which ruled him out for the final month of the season. The injury likely cost Keedy a place on England's tour to Pakistan and India.

Until recently, many observers believed the main reason that Keedy had never played for the national team is his lack of batting talent and poor fielding qualities. Despite this, left-arm orthodox spinner Monty Panesar, who is also not renowned for his batting or fielding skills, played all three Tests in India, and was a permanent fixture in the England squad until 2009.

In All Out Cricket's October 2006 edition, Gary Keedy was voted the best county player never to have played for England.

Although Keedy only took 28 wickets in the 2008 County Championship, he felt that the statistics did not reflect how well he bowled.

Wickets taken is not the major factor ... I try and judge my own performances on how I have influenced the match. It might be a guy who is on 100 who I get out with a brilliant piece of bowling and from there you have influenced that match – even though you might end up with just 1/40. I felt like I had my most consistent season with the ball but did not get the return last year. I felt like players had a little bit more respect for me. At Hove was as well as I had ever bowled. Me and [Andrew Flintoff] didn't get a wicket between us but we set the game up for [Glen Chapple] to get six wickets. In other games I have had teams come and sit on me rather than come after me, and I think Somerset, where I took five wickets, is an example of us having not played them for a while helping me. Their batsmen have not faced me for a while and they had the approach of attacking me. Because I bowled well, I got the return."

— Gary Keedy

Keedy is studying for a four-year degree in physiotherapy at the University of Salford in preparation for life after his playing career. For the 2009 season, former England coach Peter Moores joined Lancashire as the club's coach, replacing Mike Watkinson, who became Lancashire's director of cricket. Keedy admitted to being "nervous" and wanted to make a good impression. Despite initial nerves, Keedy finished 2009 as the club's leading wicket-taker in first-class cricket, with 45 scalps from 17 matches. 2009 was also Keedy's benefit season. Events to raise money included a golf day with Ian Botham and a Strictly Come Dancing-style ball.

Keedy bowling against Durham in the 2012 Friends Life Twenty20

In a warm-up match against Durham before the 2010 season started, Keedy broke his collar bone. The injury left him unable to play for several months. In Keedy's absence, Lancashire's young spinners, Stephen Parry and Simon Kerrigan, were given opportunities in the first team. Kerrigan was chosen ahead of Parry in the four-day team and cemented his place in the side. When Keedy returned from injury he and Kerrigan sometimes bowled together in the County Championship. Their partnership began with them competing to out perform each other. After a discussion the pair decided they would be more effective if they worked together to build pressure while bowling. Keedy finished the season with 31 first-class wickets at an average of 22.19.

During the 2011 season Keedy was preferred to Kerrigan when Lancashire chose to play with one spinner in the County Championship. In August 2011 rumours emerged that Keedy had been approached by Warwickshire. In September, in the last match of the season Lancashire won the County Championship for the first time since they shared the title in 1950. Keedy finished as the team's leading wicket-taker in the competition, taking 61 wickets to help them to the title. The same month he agreed to sign a new contract with the club. Speaking on the matter later, Keedy remarked that he felt the offer adversely affected his form as it distracted from playing for Lancashire; to deal with this, he deferred acting on the offer until the end of the season. Although Warwickshire offered a pay rise, Keedy chose to remain with Lancashire, saying "Ultimately the decision was based on what I've done here for the last 17 years. It boiled down to the support network around me, including my family."

The Bangladesh Cricket Board in 2012 founded the six-team Bangladesh Premier League, a twenty20 tournament to be held in February that year. An auction was held for teams to buy players, and Keedy was bought by the Sylhet Royals for $25,000. He played a single match in the competition, and bowled just two overs against the Dhaka Gladiators without taking a wicket. In June 2012, Keedy took the second five-wicket haul of his one-day career, taking 5/55 in Lancashire's 167-run loss to Middlesex; during the match he also claimed his 100th wicket in the format, that of batsman Joe Denly, caught by Ashwell Prince.

=== Surrey and Nottinghamshire ===
After playing just four Championship games in the 2012 season, Keedy signed a two-year deal with Surrey with Lancashire's best wishes, for him to "fulfil my ambitions" and play as much cricket as possible.

On 19 December 2013, it was announced that for the 2014 season, Keedy would be joining Nottinghamshire. Although registered as a member of the playing staff, his primary role will be as assistant physio. He will continue in a physiotherapy role, as well as acting as spin bowling coach, after his retirement at the end of the 2015 season, in which he only played one first-class game.
