= Tom Knight (cricketer) =

English cricketer (born 1993)

Personal information
- Full name: Thomas Craig David Knight
- Born: 28 June 1993 (age 33); Sheffield, Yorkshire, England
- Batting: Right-handed
- Bowling: Slow left-arm orthodox
- Role: Bowler

Domestic team information
- Years: Team
- 2011–2016: Derbyshire (squad no. 27)
- FC debut: 27 June 2011 Derbyshire v Glamorgan
- LA debut: 14 August 2011 Derbyshire v Yorkshire

Career statistics
| Competition | FC | LA | T20 |
|---|---|---|---|
| Matches | 4 | 9 | 30 |
| Runs scored | 57 | 16 | 179 |
| Batting average | 14.25 | 5.33 | 25.57 |
| 100s/50s | 0/0 | 0/0 | 0/0 |
| Top score | 25 | 10 | 44* |
| Balls bowled | 300 | 360 | 276 |
| Wickets | 2 | 9 | 13 |
| Bowling average | 82.00 | 35.66 | 26.15 |
| 5 wickets in innings | 0 | 0 | 0 |
| 10 wickets in match | 0 | 0 | 0 |
| Best bowling | 2/32 | 2/27 | 3/16 |
| Catches/stumpings | 3/– | 0/– | 11/– |
- Source: Cricinfo, 27 July 2016

Thomas Craig Knight (born 28 June 1993) is an English first-class cricketer who has played first-class cricket and Twenty20 cricket for Derbyshire from 2011. He was born at Sheffield, Yorkshire. His contract was cancelled by mutual consent in July 2016.
