= Russell Cobb =

English cricketer (born 1961)

Russell Alan Cobb
- Born: May 18, 1961 (age 65)
- Occupation: cricketer

Russell Alan Cobb (born 18 May 1961) is an English former cricketer who played more than one-hundred and fifty matches for Leicestershire and Northern Transvaal across a career that ran from 1980 until 1989. A right-handed batsman, he scored over 4,000 runs across the first-class and List A formats, though he never made a century. He also bowled left-arm medium pace and slow left-arm spin bowling, though only very occasionally. His son, Josh Cobb, also played for Leicestershire.
