= Tim Phillips (cricketer) =

English cricketer

Personal information
- Full name: Timothy James Phillips
- Born: 13 March 1981 (age 45); Cambridge, England
- Batting: Left-handed
- Bowling: Slow left-arm orthodox

Domestic team information
- Years: Team
- 1999–2014: Essex

Career statistics
Competition	FC	LA	T20
Matches	78	88	82
Runs scored	1,853	542	384
Batting average	20.14	20.07	19.20
100s/50s	0/7	0/1	0/1
Top score	89	58*	57*
Balls bowled	10,024	2,910	1,331
Wickets	132	94	65
Bowling average	45.56	26.80	26.18
5 wickets in innings	1	4	0
10 wickets in match	0	0	0
Best bowling	5/41	5/28	4/22
Catches/stumpings	52/–	25/–	37/–
- Source: Cricinfo, 25 August 2015

Timothy James Phillips (born 13 March 1981) is an English cricketer who was educated at Felsted. He is a left-handed batsman and a slow left-arm bowler. He has played for Essex since the age of 18.

Phillips usually bats at around 7/8/9 for Essex and has been known to rescue his team from ominous situations with useful scores. His bowling is slow left arm orthodox. He struggled to make his name a permanent fixture on the Essex teamsheet between his debut in 1999 and 2010 due to the presence of Pakistani legspinner Danish Kaneria for six of those years. However, in the 2011 season, following Kaneria's departure, Phillips looks to have gained an Essex starting place in all forms of the game, a fact outlined by the fact that Essex chose not to sign another spinner to replace Kaneria. Tim Phillips is also a very capable fielder. He often fields at either third slip or gully, and very rarely drops catches.

Phillips famously bowled Kevin Pietersen, playing his first home game for Hampshire, for a five-ball duck. More recently, Phillips has taken part in the Twenty20 Cup, turning in some sturdy bowling performances and employing clever technique, helping his team reach the semi-final stage for the first time.

Phillips claimed man of the match in the Twenty 20 quarter final with figures of 2–11, taking Essex through to finals day for the first time ever. In 2009 Phillips returned to the squad having undergone surgery on his knee, to take another Man of the Match award for his 5–38 and 41 runs in the Pro 40 clash with Somerset.
