= List of Unicorns List A players =

The Unicorns played in List A cricket matches between 2010 and 2013. This is a list of the players who appeared in those matches.

- Jahid Ahmed (2010): JS Ahmed
- Arfan Akram (2010): Arfan Akram
- Atiq Chishti (2010): Atiq Chishti
- Luke Beaven (2011–2013): LE Beaven
- Chris Benham (2011): CC Benham
- Chris Brown (2010): C Brown
- James Campbell (2011–2012): JRA Campbell
- Steven Cheetham (2012): SP Cheetham
- Tom Craddock (2011): TR Craddock
- Wes Durston (2010): WJ Durston
- Scott Elstone (2013): SL Elstone
- Devon Endersby (2013): DM Endersby
- Tom Friend (2011): TT Friend
- Neil Hancock (2010): ND Hancock
- Lewis Hill (2012–2013): LJ Hill
- Paul Hindmarch (2012–2013): PR Hindmarch
- Josh Knappett (2010–2011): JPT Knappett
- Tom Lancefield (2013): TJ Lancefield
- Warren Lee (2012–2013): WW Lee
- Robin Lett (2011): RJH Lett
- Jayden Levitt (2011–2012): JR Levitt
- Matt Lineker (2013): MS Lineker
- Andrew McGarry (2011): AC McGarry
- Tom Mees (2010): T Mees
- Jonathan Miles (2010–2011): JS Miles
- Chris Murtagh (2010): CP Murtagh
- Tom New (2012–2013): TJ New
- Aneurin Norman (2013): AJ Norman
- James Ord (2011–2012): JE Ord
- Mike O'Shea (2010–2013): MP O'Shea
- Craig Park (2011–2012): CM Park
- Garry Park (2013): GT Park
- Sean Park (2010): SM Park
- Keith Parsons (2010–2013): KA Parsons
- Chris Peploe (2010–2011): CT Peploe
- Josh Poysden (2013): JE Poysden
- Glenn Querl (2010–2013): RG Querl
- Amar Rashid (2011): A Rashid
- Luis Reece (2011–2012): LM Reece
- Dominic Reed (2013): DT Reed
- Michael Roberts (2012): MDT Roberts
- Neil Saker (2010–2011): NC Saker
- Tom Sharp (2010): TG Sharp
- Chris Skidmore (2013): CJ Skidmore
- Jackson Thompson (2010–2011): JG Thompson
- Michael Thornely (2011–2012): MA Thornely
- Bharat Tripathi (2013): B Tripathi
- Vishal Tripathi (2012–2013): V Tripathi
- Bradley Wadlan (2011–2013): BL Wadlan
- Dan Wheeldon (2011–2012): DM Wheeldon
- Rob Woolley (2012–2013): RJJ Woolley
- Ed Young (2010): EGC Young
