= 2011 Clydesdale Bank 40 =

- Dates: 24 April – 17 September 2011
- Administrator: England and Wales Cricket Board
- Cricket format: Limited overs cricket (40 overs)
- Tournament format(s): Group stage and knockout
- Champions: Surrey Lions (1st title)
- Participants: 21
- Matches: 129
- Most runs: 649 Chris Nash (Sussex Sharks)
- Most wickets: 21 Shane Mott (Netherlands)

The 2011 Clydesdale Bank 40 tournament was the second season of the ECB 40 limited overs cricket competition for the English and Welsh first-class counties. In addition to the 18 counties, Scotland and the Netherlands took part, as well as the Unicorns, a team of players who did not have first-class contracts.

The competition consisted of three groups of seven teams, from which the top team from each group, plus the best second-placed team, progressed to the semi-finals. The groups were allocated randomly.

== Fixtures and results ==
=== Group stage ===
==== Group A ====
	Derbyshire Falcons	Kent Spitfires	Middlesex Panthers	Netherlands	Sussex Sharks	Worcestershire Royals	Yorkshire Carnegie
Derbyshire Falcons		Derbyshire; 31 runs	Middlesex; 34 runs	Netherlands; 13 runs	Derbyshire; 6 wickets	Worcestershire; 23 runs (D/L)	Derbyshire; 6 wickets
Kent Spitfires	Derbyshire; 3 wickets		Kent; 2 wickets	Kent; 4 wickets	Sussex; 19 runs	Worcestershire; 6 wickets	Yorkshire; 93 runs
Middlesex Panthers	Middlesex; 7 wickets	Kent; 8 Wickets		Middlesex; 1 run	Middlesex; 7 wickets	Middlesex; 6 wickets	Yorkshire; 22 runs
Netherlands	Match tied	Netherlands; 40 runs	Middlesex; 7 wickets		Sussex; 148 runs	Match abandoned	Netherlands; 4 wickets
Sussex Sharks	Sussex; 8 wickets	Kent; 14 runs	Sussex; 9 wickets	Sussex; 5 wickets		Sussex; 80 runs	Sussex; 76 runs
Worcestershire Royals	Derbyshire; 6 wickets	Kent; 86 runs	Middlesex; 24 runs	Netherlands; 2 wickets	Sussex; 8 wickets		Yorkshire; 7 wickets
Yorkshire Carnegie	Derbyshire; 52 runs	Kent; 2 wickets	Middlesex; 6 wickets	Netherlands; 2 runs	Yorkshire; 35 runs	Yorkshire; 6 wickets	

Pos	Team	Pld	W	L	T	NR	Pts	NRR
1	Sussex Sharks	12	8	4	0	0	16	1.070
2	Middlesex Panthers	12	8	4	0	0	16	0.213
3	Derbyshire Falcons	12	6	5	1	0	13	−0.079
4	Kent Spitfires	12	6	6	0	0	12	−0.017
5	Netherlands	12	5	5	1	1	12	−0.361
6	Yorkshire Carnegie	12	5	7	0	0	10	−0.147
7	Worcestershire Royals	12	2	9	0	1	5	−0.710

Source: CricketArchive

===== April =====
24 April
Scorecard

Middlesex Panthers; 206 (39.4 overs)	v	Worcestershire Royals; 182 (38.4 overs)
Neil Dexter 48 (59); Gareth Andrew 3/42 (6.4 overs)		Vikram Solanki 51 (68); Gareth Berg 4/24 (7 overs)

Middlesex Panthers won by 24 runs
County Ground, New Road, Worcester
Umpires: Peter Hartley and Richard Kettleborough

- Middlesex Panthers won the toss and elected to bat.

24 April
Scorecard

Netherlands; 190/8 (40 overs)	v	Yorkshire Carnegie; 188/9 (40 overs)
Shane Mott 50* (47); Adil Rashid 2/20 (8 overs)		Rich Pyrah 69 (82); Mudassar Bukhari 3/26 (8 overs)

Netherlands won by 2 runs
Headingley, Leeds
Umpires: Steve Garratt and Peter Willey

- Yorkshire Carnegie won the toss and elected to field.

25 April
Scorecard

Netherlands; 204/6 (40 overs)	v	Derbyshire Falcons; 191/9 (40 overs)
Wesley Barresi 74 (106); Steffan Jones 2/30 (8 overs)		Wayne Madsen 75 (79); Peter Borren 3/29 (8 overs)

Netherlands won by 13 runs
County Ground, Derby
Umpires: Peter Hartley and Nigel Llong

- Netherlands won the toss and elected to bat.

===== May =====
1 May
Scorecard

Sussex Sharks; 193/8 (40 overs)	v	Derbyshire Falcons; 194/4 (37.4 overs)
Ed Joyce 37 (40); Chesney Hughes 3/19 (8 overs)		Wes Durston 70 (90); Monty Panesar 1/33 (6 overs)

Derbyshire Falcons won by 6 wickets
County Ground, Derby
Umpires: Rob Bailey and Trevor Jesty

- Sussex Sharks won the toss and elected to bat.

1 May
Scorecard

Kent Spitfires; 232/8 (40 overs)	v	Worcestershire Royals; 233/4 (39.3 overs)
Martin van Jaarsveld 81 (81); Gareth Andrew 3/41 (8 overs)		Alexei Kervezee 69 (84); Adam Riley 2/37 (8 overs)

Worcestershire Royals won by 6 wickets
St Lawrence Ground, Canterbury
Umpires: Michael Gough and Steve O'Shaughnessy

- Kent Spitfires won the toss and elected to bat.

1 May
Scorecard

Middlesex Panthers; 286/5 (40 overs)	v	Netherlands; 285/6 (40 overs)
Dawid Malan 90 (85); Shane Mott 2/58 (8 overs)		Tom Cooper 126* (100); Paul Stirling 2/38 (6 overs)

Middlesex Panthers won by 1 run
Lord's, London
Umpires: Nigel Cowley and Neil Mallender

- Netherlands won the toss and elected to field.

2 May
Scorecard

Middlesex Panthers; 176/9 (40 overs)	v	Kent Spitfires; 178/2 (31 overs)
Scott Newman 49 (73); Ashley Shaw 3/26 (7 overs)		Martin van Jaarsveld 85 (73); Tim Murtagh 1/27 (3 overs)

Kent Spitfires won by 8 wickets
Lord's, London
Umpires: Michael Gough and Nigel Llong

- Kent Spitfires won the toss and elected to field.

2 May
Scorecard

Netherlands; 225/7 (40 overs)	v	Sussex Sharks; 226/5 (36.5 overs)
Eric Szwarczynski 111 (117); Chris Nash 3/30 (6 overs)		Murray Goodwin 109* (88); Mudassar Bukhari 3/38 (7 overs)

Sussex Sharks won by 5 wickets
County Ground, Hove
Umpires: Nigel Cowley and Jeremy Lloyds

- Netherlands won the toss and elected to bat.

2 May
Scorecard

Derbyshire Falcons; 245/8 (40 overs)	v	Yorkshire Carnegie; 193 (39 overs)
Wes Durston 95 (99); Rich Pyrah 3/41 (8 overs)		Andrew Gale 74 (86); Wes Durston 3/25 (7 overs)

Derbyshire Falcons won by 52 runs
Headingley, Leeds
Umpires: Nick Cook and Jeff Evans

- Derbyshire Falcons won the toss and elected to bat.

8 May
Scorecard

Yorkshire Carnegie; 254/7 (40 overs)	v	Kent Spitfires; 161 (31.4 overs)
Andrew Gale 112 (114); Adam Ball 2/33 (5 overs)		Darren Stevens 39 (46); Adil Rashid 3/30 (8 overs)

Yorkshire Carnegie won by 93 runs
St Lawrence Ground, Canterbury
Umpires: Rob Bailey and Nigel Cowley

- Yorkshire Carnegie won the toss and elected to bat.

8 May
Scorecard

Middlesex Panthers; 123 (36.5 overs)	v	Sussex Sharks; 124/1 (22.4 overs)
Gareth Berg 52 (79); Naved-ul-Hasan 3/21 (6 overs)		Luke Wright 71 (68); Steven Finn 1/33 (4 overs)

Sussex Sharks won by 9 wickets
County Ground, Hove
Umpires: Andy Hicks and Peter Willey

- Middlesex Panthers won the toss and elected to bat.

8 May
Scorecard

Worcestershire Royals; 171 (38.1 overs)	v	Derbyshire Falcons; 175/4 (38.4 overs)
James Cameron 69 (80); Tim Groenewald 5/22 (7.1 overs)		Usman Khawaja 89* (111); Daryl Mitchell 1/6 (2.5 overs)

Derbyshire Falcons won by 6 wickets
County Ground, New Road, Worcester
Umpires: Nick Cook and Steve Garratt

- Derbyshire Falcons won the toss and elected to field.

12 May
Scorecard

Middlesex Panthers; 104 (32.4 overs)	v	Netherlands; 105/3 (23 overs)
Michael Swart 57 (82); Corey Collymore 3/17 (7.5 overs)		Paul Stirling 39* (37); Shane Mott 2/30 (8 overs)

Middlesex Panthers won by 7 wickets
Sportpark Het Schootsveld, Deventer
Umpires: Stephen Gale (Eng) and George Sharp (Eng)

- Middlesex Panthers won the toss and elected to field.

15 May
Scorecard

Derbyshire Falcons; 196/8 (40 overs)	v	Sussex Sharks; 199/2 (30.1 overs)
Wes Durston 85 (103); Michael Yardy 3/46 (8 overs)		Ed Joyce 90 (93); Chesney Hughes 2/24 (3 overs)

Sussex Sharks won by 8 wickets
County Ground, Hove
Umpires: Nigel Llong and Steve Malone

- Sussex Sharks won the toss and elected to field.

15 May
Scorecard

Yorkshire Carnegie; 230/7 (40 overs)	v	Kent Spitfires; 232/8 (39.4 overs)
Ajmal Shahzad 59* (34); Alex Blake 2/13 (2 overs)		Martin van Jaarsveld 74 (65); Steven Patterson 3/45 (8 overs)

Kent Spitfires won by 2 wickets
Headingley, Leeds
Umpires: Jeremy Lloyds and Neil Mallender

- Kent Spitfires won the toss and elected to field.

17 May
Scorecard

Netherlands; 163/9 (40 overs)	v	Derbyshire Falcons; 163/9 (40 overs)
Mudassar Bukhari 41 (25); Greg Smith 3/39 (8 overs)		Garry Park 38 (71); Shane Mott 4/29 (8 overs)

Match tied
Sportpark Het Schootsveld, Deventer
Umpires: Steve O'Shaughnessy (Eng) and John Steele (Eng)

- Derbyshire Falcons won the toss and elected to field.

17 May (D/N)
Scorecard

Worcestershire Royals; 217/6 (40 overs)	v	Middlesex Panthers; 221/4 (35.4 overs)
James Cameron 60* (66); Gareth Berg 2/51 (8 overs)		Dawid Malan 75 (77); James Cameron 1/9 (2 overs)

Middlesex Panthers won by 6 wickets
Lord's, London
Umpires: Jeff Evans and Steve Garratt

- Worcestershire Royals won the toss and elected to bat.

22 May
Scorecard

Sussex Sharks; 249 (40 overs)	v	Kent Spitfires; 230/9 (40 overs)
Chris Nash 124* (119); Azhar Mahmood 3/52 (8 overs)		Rob Key 59 (81); Monty Panesar 2/28 (6 overs)

Sussex Sharks won by 19 runs
St Lawrence Ground, Canterbury
Umpires: Jeff Evans and Peter Willey

- Kent Spitfires won the toss and elected to field.

22 May
Scorecard

Worcestershire Royals; 155/9 (40 overs)	v	Yorkshire Carnegie; 156/3 (36.3 overs)
James Cameron 51 (89); Steven Patterson 4/28 (8 overs)		Andrew Gale 56 (89); Shaaiq Choudhry 1/25 (8 overs)

Yorkshire Carnegie won by 7 wickets
County Ground, New Road, Worcester
Umpires: Rob Bailey and Michael Gough

- Worcestershire Royals won the toss and elected to bat.

===== July =====
17 July
Scorecard

Netherlands; 206/8 (37 overs)	v	Kent Spitfires; 165 (34.5 overs)
Peter Borren 71 (33); Joe Denly 3/42 (7 overs)		Martin van Jaarsveld 61 (51); Shane Mott 3/27 (6.5 overs)

Netherlands won by 40 runs
Hazelaarweg, Rotterdam
Umpires: Trevor Jesty and Richard Kettleborough

- Kent Spitfires won the toss and elected to field.

17 July
Scorecard

Yorkshire Carnegie; 196/7 (31 overs)	v	Middlesex Panthers; 197/4 (30 overs)
Gary Ballance 71 (53); Corey Collymore 3/52 (6 overs)		Paul Stirling 57 (40); Ajmal Shahzad 1/34 (6 overs)

Middlesex Panthers won by 6 wickets
Headingley, Leeds
Umpires: David Millns and Tim Robinson

- Middlesex Panthers won the toss and elected to field

18 July
Scorecard

Netherlands	v	Worcestershire Royals

Match abandoned without a ball bowled
Hazelaarweg, Rotterdam

- No toss

24 July
Scorecard

Derbyshire Falcons; 249/9 (40 overs)	v	Kent Spitfires; 218 (34.1 overs)
Martin Guptill 102 (109); Azhar Mahmood 4/57 (8 overs)		Darren Stevens 65 (52); Jonathan Clare 3/61 (7.1 overs)

Derbyshire Falcons won by 31 runs
County Ground, Derby
Umpires: Graham Lloyd and Neil Mallender

- Kent Spifires won the toss and elected to field.

24 July
Scorecard

Worcestershire Royals; 217/7 (40 overs)	v	Sussex Sharks; 218/2 (29.3 overs)
Vikram Solanki 57 (78); Michael Yardy 2/34 (6 overs)		Ed Joyce 101* (89); Daryl Mitchell 1/16 (2 overs)

Sussex Sharks won by 8 wickets
County Ground, New Road, Worcester
Umpires: Jeff Evans and Stephen Gale

- Worcestershire Royals won the toss and elected to bat.

27 July (D/N)
Scorecard

Sussex Sharks; 246/7 (40 overs)	v	Yorkshire Carnegie; 170 (34.3 overs)
Chris Nash 79 (84); Adil Rashid 2/35 (8 overs)		Jonny Bairstow 43 (44); Michael Yardy 4/10 (3.3 overs)

Sussex Sharks won by 76 runs
County Ground, Hove
Umpires: Nigel Cowley and John Steele

- Sussex Sharks won the toss and elected to bat first

28 July (D/N)
Scorecard

Derbyshire Falcons; 173/9 (40 overs)	v	Middlesex Panthers; 174/3 (29 overs)
Wes Durston 45 (49); Steven Finn 5/33 (8 overs)		Paul Stirling 43 (33); Tony Palladino 1/31 (6 overs)

Middlesex Panthers won by 7 wickets
Lord's, London
Umpires: Rob Bailey and Richard Kettleborough

- Derbyshire Falcons won the toss and elected to bat first

30 July
Scorecard

Sussex Sharks; 271/2 (40 overs)	v	Netherlands; 123 (35.2 overs)
Chris Nash 116* (111); Peter Borren 1/42 (6 overs)		Tom de Grooth 30 (32); Chris Liddle 5/18 (8 overs)

Sussex Sharks won by 148 runs
VRA Ground, Amstelveen
Umpires: Martin Bodenham and John Steele

- Netherlands won the toss and elected to field first

31 July
Scorecard

Yorkshire Carnegie; 123 (39.1 overs)	v	Netherlands; 126/6 (27.3 overs)
Adil Rashid 43 (59); Mudassar Bukhari 3/28 (8 overs)		Peter Borren 34 (26); Ajmal Shahzad 2/22 (6 overs)

Netherlands won by 4 wickets
VRA Ground, Amstelveen
Umpires: Martin Bodenham and John Steele

- Yorkshire Carnegie won the toss and elected to bat first

31 July
Scorecard

Kent Spitfires; 291/7 (40 overs)	v	Worcestershire Royals; 205 (34.3 overs)
Martin van Jaarsveld 124 (97); Saeed Ajmal 3/42 (8 overs)		Moeen Ali 55 (35); David Balcombe 4/38 (5.3 overs)

Kent Spitfires won by 86 runs
County Ground, New Road, Worcester
Umpires: Ismail Dawood and Neil Mallender

- Kent Spitfires won the toss and elected to bat first

===== August =====
4 August (D/N)
Scorecard

Worcestershire Royals; 197/8 (36 overs)	v	Derbyshire Falcons; 174 (34.3 overs)
Vikram Solanki 84 (77); Wes Durston 3/7 (2 overs)		Martin Guptill 64 (72); Saeed Ajmal 4/24 (7 overs)

Worcestershire Royals won by 23 runs (D/L)
County Ground, Derby
Umpires: Nigel Llong and Tim Robinson

- Worcestershire Royals won the toss and elected to bat

10 August (D/N)
Scorecard

Yorkshire Carnegie; 275/4 (40 overs)	v	Middlesex Panthers; 253 (38 overs)
Jonny Bairstow 114 (87); Steven Crook 1/46 (8 overs)		Paul Stirling 68 (47); Adil Rashid 3/43 (8 overs)

Yorkshire Carnegie won by 22 runs
Lord's, London
Umpires: Michael Gough and Steve O'Shaughnessy

- Middlesex Panthers won the toss and elected to field

14 August
Scorecard

Yorkshire Carnegie; 234/7 (40 overs)	v	Derbyshire Falcons; 235/4 (33.4 overs)
Gary Ballance 81 (65); Garry Park 2/21 (5 overs)		Martin Guptill 103* (83); Steven Patterson 2/29 (7 overs)

Derbyshire Falcons won by 6 wickets
Queen's Park, Chesterfield
Umpires: Martin Bodenham and Peter Willey

- Yorkshire Carnegie won the toss and elected to bat

14 August
Scorecard

Netherlands; 199/6 (40 overs)	v	Kent Spitfires; 200/6 (35.5 overs)
Mudassar Bukhari 78* (62); Adam Ball 2/32 (7 overs)		Darren Stevens 70 (67); Shane Mott 3/50 (8 overs)

Kent Spitfires won by 4 wickets
St Lawrence Ground, Canterbury
Umpires: Stephen Gale and John Steele

- Netherlands won the toss and elected to bat

14 August
Scorecard

Sussex Sharks; 399/4 (40 overs)	v	Worcestershire Royals; 319 (36 overs)
Joe Gatting 122 (94); Jack Shantry 2/68 (8 overs)		Moeen Ali 158 (92); Naved Arif 3/54 (7 overs)

Sussex Sharks won by 80 runs
Cricket Field Road Ground, Horsham
Umpires: Nigel Cowley and George Sharp

- Sussex Sharks won the toss and elected to bat

16 August (D/N)
Scorecard

Middlesex Panthers; 263 (39.3 overs)	v	Kent Spitfires; 264/8 (39.3 overs)
Dawid Malan 107 (113); Wahab Riaz 5/46 (6.3 overs)		Darren Stevens 65 (54); Toby Roland-Jones 3/51 (8 overs)

Kent Spitfires won by 2 wickets
St Lawrence Ground, Canterbury
Umpires: Rob Bailey and George Sharp

- Middlesex Panthers won the toss and elected to bat

21 August
Scorecard

Middlesex Panthers; 253/8 (40 overs)	v	Derbyshire Falcons; 219 (35.4 overs)
Paul Stirling 109 (81); Peter Burgoyne 2/36 (6 overs)		Chesney Hughes 66 (69); Steven Finn 3/28 (6 overs)

Middlesex Panthers won by 34 runs
Queen's Park, Chesterfield
Umpires: Jeremy Lloyds and Steve O'Shaughnessy

- Derbyshire Falcons won the toss and elected to field

21 August
Scorecard

Worcestershire Royals; 239/8 (40 overs)	v	Netherlands; 240/8 (39.4 overs)
Moeen Ali 117 (110); Mudassar Bukhari 4/41 (8 overs)		Wesley Barresi 97* (84); Jack Shantry 3/39 (8 overs)

Netherlands won by 2 wickets
County Ground, New Road, Worcester
Umpires: Peter Hartley and David Millns

- Worcestershire Royals won the toss and elected to bat

21 August
Scorecard

Yorkshire Carnegie; 302/4 (40 overs)	v	Sussex Sharks; 267 (36.5 overs)
Jacques Rudolph 132* (112); Wayne Parnell 2/48 (8 overs)		Ben Brown 60 (51); Adil Rashid 3/64 (8 overs)

Yorkshire Carnegie won by 35 runs
North Marine Road Ground, Scarborough
Umpires: Nick Cook and Trevor Jesty

- Sussex Sharks won the toss and elected to field

23 August (D/N)
Scorecard

Kent Spitfires; 216 (40 overs)	v	Sussex Sharks; 202 (39 overs)
Azhar Mahmood 58 (53); Wayne Parnell 3/31 (8 overs)		Chris Nash 49 (34); Adam Ball 2/31 (8 overs)

Kent Spitfires won by 14 runs
County Ground, Hove
Umpires: Rob Bailey and Peter Hartley

- Kent Spitfires won the toss and elected to bat

29 August
Scorecard

Kent Spitfires; 208/9 (40 overs)	v	Derbyshire Falcons; 211/7 (39.3 overs)
Azhar Mahmood 68 (93); Tony Palladino 4/32 (7 overs)		Wayne Madsen 64 (69); James Tredwell 2/35 (8 overs)

Derbyshire Falcons won by 3 wickets
St Lawrence Ground, Canterbury
Umpires: Richard Illingworth and Tim Robinson

- Kent Spitfires won the toss and elected to bat

29 August
Scorecard

Sussex Sharks; 239/5 (40 overs)	v	Middlesex Panthers; 240/3 (37.1 overs)
Chris Nash 57 (46); Jamie Dalrymple 2/41 (8 overs)		Dawid Malan 84 (84); Chris Nash 1/24 (4.1 overs)

Middlesex Panthers won by 7 wickets
Lord's, London
Umpires: Neil Mallender and David Millns

- Sussex Sharks won the toss and elected to bat

29 August
Scorecard

Worcestershire Royals; 230/6 (40 overs)	v	Yorkshire Carnegie; 231/4 (38.1 overs)
Daryl Mitchell 81* (80); David Wainwright 2/33 (8 overs)		Jonny Bairstow 80 (67); Nick Harrison 2/43 (8 overs)

Yorkshire Carnegie won by 6 wickets
Headingley, Leeds
Umpires: Martin Bodenham and Stephen Gale

- Yorkshire Carnegie won the toss and elected to field

==== Group B ====
	Durham Dynamos	Hampshire Royals	Leicestershire Foxes	Northamptonshire Steelbacks	Scottish Saltires	Surrey Lions	Warwickshire Bears
Durham Dynamos		Durham; 7 wickets	Durham; 37 runs	Northamptonshire; 5 wickets	Durham; 5 wickets	Match abandoned	Durham; 5 wickets
Hampshire Royals	Durham; 81 runs (D/L)		Hampshire; 53 runs	Northamptonshire; 7 wickets	Hampshire; 115 runs	Surrey; 4 wickets	Hampshire; 3 runs
Leicestershire Foxes	Durham; 69 runs	Match abandoned		Leicestershire; 5 wickets	Leicestershire; 32 runs	Surrey; 141 runs	Warwickshire; 8 wickets
Northamptonshire Steelbacks	Durham; 8 wickets	Hampshire; 174 runs	Northamptonshire; 7 wickets		Northamptonshire; 4 wickets	Surrey; 3 wickets	Northamptonshire; 18 runs
Scottish Saltires	Durham; 80 runs	Hampshire; 4 runs (D/L)	Match abandoned	Scotland; 12 runs		Surrey; 48 runs	Scotland; 4 runs
Surrey Lions	Durham; 36 runs	Surrey; 36 runs	Surrey; 17 runs	Surrey; 12 runs	Surrey; 7 wickets		Surrey; 3 wickets
Warwickshire Bears	Warwickshire; 7 wickets	Warwickshire; 51 runs	Warwickshire; 9 runs	Northamptonshire; 5 wickets	Warwickshire; 6 runs	Surrey; 130 runs	

Pos	Team	Pld	W	L	T	NR	Pts	NRR
1	Surrey Lions	12	10	1	0	1	21	1.047
2	Durham Dynamos	12	9	2	0	1	19	0.901
3	Northamptonshire Steelbacks	12	6	6	0	0	12	−0.304
4	Hampshire Royals	12	5	6	0	1	11	0.224
5	Warwickshire Bears	12	5	7	0	0	10	−0.274
6	Leicestershire Foxes	12	2	8	0	2	6	−0.833
7	Scottish Saltires	12	2	9	0	1	5	−0.857

Source: CricketArchive

===== April =====
24 April
Scorecard

Scottish Saltires; 215/7 (40 overs)	v	Durham Dynamos; 219/5 (38.2 overs)
Preston Mommsen 73* (54); Graham Onions 3/46 (8 overs)		Gordon Muchall 95* (97); Josh Davey 2/18 (6 overs)

Durham Dynamos won by 5 wickets
Riverside Ground, Chester-le-Street
Umpires: Neil Bainton and Neil Mallender

- Scottish Saltires won the toss and elected to bat.

24 April
Scorecard

Hampshire Royals; 274/5 (40 overs)	v	Warwickshire Bears; 271/9 (40 overs)
Neil McKenzie 87* (69); Keith Barker 2/56 (7 overs)		Rikki Clarke 59 (38); Simon Jones 4/52 (8 overs)

Hampshire Royals won by 3 runs
The Rose Bowl, Southampton
Umpires: Martin Bodenham and Trevor Jesty

- Warwickshire Bears won the toss and elected to field.

24 April
Scorecard

Leicestershire Foxes; 162 (35.1 overs)	v	Northamptonshire Steelbacks; 168/3 (30.1 overs)
James Taylor 69 (61); Andrew Hall 5/22 (7.1 overs)		Niall O'Brien 94* (63); Matthew Hoggard 2/35 (6 overs)

Northamptonshire won by 7 wickets
County Ground, Northampton
Umpires: Nick Cook and Tim Robinson

- Leicestershire Foxes won the toss and elected to bat.

25 April
Scorecard

Leicestershire Foxes; 253/4 (40 overs)	v	Scottish Saltires; 221/9 (40 overs)
James Taylor 81* (76); Gordon Drummond 2/52 (8 overs)		Ewan Chalmers 50 (67); Nadeem Malik 3/44 (8 overs)

Leicestershire Foxes won by 32 runs
Grace Road, Leicester
Umpires: Mark Benson and Nigel Cowley

- Scottish Saltires won the toss and elected to field.

===== May =====
1 May
Scorecard

Durham Dynamos; 172 (39.1 overs)	v	Northamptonshire Steelbacks; 173/5 (38.3 overs)
Gordon Muchall 70 (92); Andrew Hall 3/29 (6.1 overs)		Alex Wakely 78* (87); Chris Rushworth 2/15 (6 overs)

Northamptonshire Steelbacks won by 5 wickets
Riverside Ground, Chester-le-Street
Umpires: Andy Hicks and David Millns

- Durham Dynamos won the toss and elected to bat.

1 May
Scorecard

Scottish Saltires; 196/9 (40 overs)	v	Surrey Lions; 200/3 (33 overs)
Josh Davey 50 (73); Yasir Arafat 3/60 (8 overs)		Steve Davies 96 (97); Gordon Goudie 2/51 (7 overs)

Surrey Lions won by 7 wickets
Kennington Oval, London
Umpires: Stephen Gale and Richard Illingworth

- Scottish Saltires won the toss and elected to bat.

1 May
Scorecard

Warwickshire Bears; 294/5 (40 overs)	v	Leicestershire Foxes; 285/7 (40 overs)
Varun Chopra 115 (110); Wayne White 2/50 (5 overs)		James Taylor 101 (86); Maurice Holmes 2/37 (8 overs)

Warwickshire Bears won by 9 runs
Edgbaston, Birmingham
Umpires: George Sharp and Peter Willey

- Warwickshire Bears won the toss and elected to bat.

2 May
Scorecard

Hampshire Royals; 141 (30 overs)	v	Surrey Lions; 142/6 (33.3 overs)
Liam Dawson 34 (36); Jade Dernbach 4/33 (7 overs)		Jason Roy 76 (108); Simon Jones 2/22 (7 overs)

Surrey Lions won by 4 wickets
The Rose Bowl, Southampton
Umpires: Mark Eggleston and Neil Mallender

- Hampshire Royals won the toss and elected to bat.

2 May
Scorecard

Durham Dynamos; 285/9 (40 overs)	v	Leicestershire Foxes; 216 (37.2 overs)
Ian Blackwell 98 (64); Alex Wyatt 2/36 (6 overs)		Josh Cobb 87 (78); Ben Stokes 3/6 (2.2 overs)

Durham Dynamos won by 69 runs
Grace Road, Leicester
Umpires: Mark Benson and John Steele

- Leicestershire Foxes won the toss and elected to field.

2 May
Scorecard

Warwickshire Bears; 224 (40 overs)	v	Scottish Saltires; 218/9 (40 overs)
William Porterfield 64 (66); Matthew Parker 5/47 (7 overs)		Josh Davey 91 (98); Chris Woakes 2/30 (7 overs)

Warwickshire Bears won by 6 runs
Edgbaston, Birmingham
Umpires: George Sharp and Peter Willey

- Warwickshire Bears won the toss and elected to bat.

8 May
Scorecard

Northamptonshire Steelbacks; 238/5 (40 overs)	v	Warwickshire Bears; 220 (39 overs)
Niall O'Brien 61 (46); Darren Maddy 2/38 (8 overs)		Ian Bell 88 (101); Chaminda Vaas 3/45 (8 overs)

Northamptonshire Steelbacks won by 18 runs
County Ground, Northampton
Umpires: Jeff Evans and Stephen Gale

- Warwickshire Bears won the toss and elected to field.

8 May
Scorecard

Surrey Lions; 206/8 (40 overs)	v	Leicestershire Foxes; 189 (38.3 overs)
Rory Hamilton-Brown 57 (61); Nathan Buck 3/54 (8 overs)		Josh Cobb 45 (36); Stuart Meaker 3/22 (5.3 overs)

Surrey Lions won by 17 runs
Kennington Oval, London
Umpires: Martin Bodenham and Peter Hartley

- Surrey Lions won the toss and elected to bat.

15 May
Scorecard

Surrey Lions; 257/7 (40 overs)	v	Scottish Saltires; 209/9 (40 overs)
Matthew Spriegel 82* (73); Majid Haq 2/32 (8 overs)		Neil McCallum 53 (51); Matthew Spriegel 2/29 (6 overs)

Surrey Lions won by 48 runs
Grange Cricket Club Ground, Raeburn Place, Edinburgh
Umpires: Nigel Cowley (Eng) and Tim Robinson (Eng)

- Scottish Saltires won the toss and elected to field.

15 May
Scorecard

Hampshire Royals; 161 (37.2 overs)	v	Durham Dynamos; 162/3 (36.4 overs)
Benny Howell 66 (85); Ben Stokes 4/29 (7 overs)		Gordon Muchall 67* (93); Dimitri Mascarenhas 3/24 (8 overs)

Durham Dynamos won by 7 wickets
Riverside Ground, Chester-le-Street
Umpires: Peter Hartley and Peter Willey

- Hampshire Royals won the toss and elected to bat.

15 May
Scorecard

Leicestershire Foxes; 205/9 (40 overs)	v	Warwickshire Bears; 209/2 (36.3 overs)
Kadeer Ali 60 (59); Darren Maddy 4/29 (6 overs)		William Porterfield 95 (98); Claude Henderson 2/34 (8 overs)

Warwickshire Bears won by 8 wickets
Grace Road, Leicester
Umpires: Neil Bainton and Michael Gough

- Warwickshire Bears won the toss and elected to field.

16 May
Scorecard

Durham Dynamos; 278/4 (40 overs)	v	Scottish Saltires; 198 (34.3 overs)
Kyle Coetzer 110* (103); Gordon Drummond 2/51 (7 overs)		Fraser Watts 62 (76); Chris Rushworth 2/27 (4.3 overs)

Durham Dynamos won by 80 runs
Grange Cricket Club Ground, Raeburn Place, Edinburgh
Umpires: Nigel Cowley (Eng) and Tim Robinson (Eng)

- Scottish Saltires won the toss and elected to field.

20 May (D/N)
Scorecard

Hampshire Royals; 200/9 (40 overs)	v	Northamptonshire Steelbacks; 204/3 (34.5 overs)
James Vince 58 (69); Lee Daggett 2/38 (8 overs)		Niall O'Brien 121 (94); Liam Dawson 1/32 (5 overs)

Northamptonshire Steelbacks won by 7 wickets
The Rose Bowl, Southampton
Umpires: Nick Cook and Neil Mallender
Player of the match: Niall O'Brien (Northamptonshire)

- Hampshire Royals won the toss and elected to bat.

22 May
Scorecard

Scottish Saltires; 200/5 (40 overs)	v	Northamptonshire Steelbacks; 201/6 (39.1 overs)
Preston Mommsen 81* (72); Chaminda Vaas 3/37 (8 overs)		Chaminda Vaas 68 (88); Matthew Parker 3/41 (8 overs)

Northamptonshire Steelbacks won by 4 wickets
County Ground, Northampton
Umpires: Martin Bodenham and Nick Cook

- Scottish Saltires won the toss and elected to bat.

22 May
Scorecard

Surrey Lions; 311/7 (40 overs)	v	Hampshire Royals; 275 (38.4 overs)
Tom Maynard 79 (57); Chris Wood 2/49 (8 overs)		Benny Howell 122 (113); Zander de Bruyn 3/47 (7 overs)

Surrey Lions won by 36 runs
Whitgift School, Croydon
Umpires: Richard Kettleborough and Graham Lloyd

- Hampshire Royals won the toss and elected to field.

22 May
Scorecard

Durham Dynamos; 286/3 (40 overs)	v	Warwickshire Bears; 288/3 (36.3 overs)
Ben Stokes 150* (113); Andrew Miller 2/31 (7 overs)		Varun Chopra 83 (70); Mitchell Claydon 2/68 (7.3 overs)

Warwickshire Bears won by 7 wickets
Edgbaston, Birmingham
Umpires: Paul Baldwin and Nigel Llong

- Warwickshire Bears won the toss and elected to field.

===== July =====
17 July
Scorecard

Scottish Saltires; 223/7 (36 overs)	v	Northamptonshire Steelbacks; 211/6 (36 overs)
Kyle Coetzer 122 (109); David Willey 3/49 (7 overs)		Niall O'Brien 81 (75); Majid Haq 2/64 (8 overs)

Scottish Saltires won by 12 runs
Grange Cricket Club Ground, Raeburn Place, Edinburgh
Umpires: Steve Garratt and Jeremy Lloyds

- Northamptonshire Steelbacks won the toss and elected to field.

17 July

Durham Dynamos	v	Surrey Lions

Match abandoned without a ball bowled
Riverside Ground, Chester-le-Street

- No toss

17 July
Scorecard

Hampshire Royals; 89/1 (14 overs)	v	Leicestershire Foxes
James Adams 50* (41); Jigar Naik 1/17 (2 overs)

No result
Grace Road, Leicester
Umpires: Neil Bainton and Jeff Evans

- Hampshire Royals won the toss and elected to bat

18 July
Scorecard

Scottish Saltires; 120/7 (22 overs)	v	Warwickshire Bears; 116/9 (22 overs)
George Worker 27 (20); Rikki Clarke 2/12 (4 overs)		Ant Botha 45 (24); Josh Davey 3/30 (5 overs)

Scottish Saltires won by 4 runs
Grange Cricket Club Ground, Raeburn Place, Edinburgh
Umpires: Steve Garratt and Jeremy Lloyds

- Scottish Saltires won the toss and elected to bat

19 July (D/N)
Scorecard

Durham Dynamos; 210/5 (34 overs)	v	Hampshire Royals; 134 (32.1 overs)
Paul Collingwood 73 (63); Davis Griffiths 3/36 (7 overs)		Jimmy Adams 24 (37); Gareth Breese 3/19 (7 overs)

Durham Dynamos won by 81 runs (D/L)
The Rose Bowl, Southampton
Umpires: Stephen Gale and Nigel Llong
Player of the match: Paul Collingwood (Durham)

- Durham Dynamos won the toss and elected to bat.

24 July
Scorecard

Northamptonshire Steelbacks; 206/6 (40 overs)	v	Leicestershire Foxes; 209/5 (30.4 overs)
Andrew Hall 67 (81); Nadeem Malik 3/37 (8 overs)		Josh Cobb 91* (88); James Middlebrook 2/29 (8 overs)

Leicestershire Foxes won by 5 wickets
Grace Road, Leicester
Umpires: David Millns and Martin Saggers

- Leicestershire Foxes won the toss and elected to field.

24 July
Scorecard

Warwickshire Bears; 225/8 (40 overs)	v	Surrey Lions; 227/7 (38.5 overs)
Rikki Clarke 76 (51); Yasir Arafat 5/45 (8 overs)		Zander de Bruyn 84* (92); Jeetan Patel 2/40 (8 overs)

Surrey Lions won by 3 wickets
Woodbridge Road, Guildford
Umpires: Ismail Dawood and Tim Robinson

- Warwickshire Bears won the toss and elected to bat.

25 July (D/N)
Scorecard

Hampshire Royals; 307/6 (40 overs)	v	Northamptonshire; 133 (28 overs)
Benny Howell 84* (54); David Lucas 5/48 (8 overs)		Andrew Hall 44* (48); Chris Wood 3/34 (5 overs)

Hampshire Royals won by 174 runs
County Ground, Northampton
Umpires: Michael Gough and Tim Robinson

- Hampshire Royals won the toss and elected to bat.

26 July (D/N)
Scorecard

Warwickshire Bears; 273/8 (40 overs)	v	Hampshire Royals; 222 (39.2 overs)
Rikki Clarke 63 (47); Chris Wood 3/61 (8 overs)		James Vince 82 (95); Jeetan Patel 3/41 (8 overs)

Warwickshire Bears won by 51 runs
Edgbaston, Birmingham
Umpires: Neil Bainton and Richard Illingworth

- Warwickshire Bears won the toss and elected to bat

31 July
Scorecard

Warwickshire Bears; 240/5 (40 overs)	v	Durham Dynamos; 241/5 (37.3 overs)
William Porterfield 74 (77); Mitchell Claydon 3/34 (8 overs)		Phil Mustard 129* (116); Keith Barker 3/36 (6.3 overs)

Durham Dynamos won by 5 wickets
Riverside Ground, Chester-le-Street
Umpires: Jeff Evans and Trevor Jesty

- Warwickshire Bears won the toss and elected to bat

31 July
Scorecard

Hampshire Royals; 273/3 (40 overs)	v	Leicestershire Foxes; 220/9 (40 overs)
Sean Ervine 136 (106); Alex Wyatt 2/45 (7 overs)		James Taylor 72 (88); Danny Briggs 3/30 (8 overs)

Hampshire Royals won by 53 runs
The Rose Bowl, Southampton
Umpires: Nigel Cowley and Steve Garratt

- Hampshire Royals won the toss and elected to bat

===== August =====
3 August (D/N)
Scorecard

Surrey Lions; 273/9 (40 overs)	v	Northamptonshire Steelbacks; 261/9 (40 overs)
Steven Davies 78 (68); Andrew Hall 4/44 (7 overs)		David Willey 74 (79); Rory Hamilton-Brown 3/38 (8 overs)

Surrey Lions won by 12 runs
Kennington Oval, London
Umpires: Neil Bainton and Richard Illingworth

- Surrey Lions won the toss and elected to bat

13 August

Scottish Saltires	v	Leicestershire Foxes

Match abandoned without a ball bowled
Mannofield Park, Aberdeen

- No toss

14 August
Scorecard

Durham Dynamos; 192 (37.1 overs)	v	Leicestershire Foxes; 155 (35.5 overs)
Mark Stoneman 73 (100); Matthew Hoggard 2/26 (8 overs)		Jacques du Toit 56 (65); Gareth Breese 4/21 (3.5)

Durham Dynamos won by 37 runs
Riverside Ground, Chester-le-Street
Umpires: Nick Cook and Richard Illingworth

- Leicestershire Foxes won the toss and elected to field

14 August
Scorecard

Scottish Saltires; 131/5 (23 overs)	v	Hampshire Royals; 73/1 (14 overs)
Kyle Coetzer 50 (54); Hamza Riazuddin 2/29 (4 overs)		James Vince 45 (50); Preston Mommsen 1/18 (2 overs)

Hampshire Royals won by 4 runs (D/L)
Mannofield Park, Aberdeen
Umpires: Rob Bailey and Mark Eggleston

- Scottish Saltires won the toss and elected to bat

15 August (D/N)
Scorecard

Northamptonshire Steelbacks; 296/7 (40 overs)	v	Surrey Lions; 298/7 (38.5 overs)
Alex Wakely 94 (77); Jade Dernbach 3/53 (8 overs)		Chris Schofield 72 (68); Paul Best 3/53 (8 overs)

Surrey Lions won by 3 wickets
County Ground, Northampton
Umpires: Steve O'Shaughnessy and John Steele

- Northamptonshire Steelbacks won the toss and elected to bat

17 August
Scorecard

Surrey Lions; 282/7 (40 overs)	v	Warwickshire Bears; 152 (29 overs)
Jason Roy 101 (95); Rikki Clarke 3/51 (8 overs)		Steffan Piolet 39 (36); Matthew Spriegel 3/39 (8 overs)

Surrey Lions won by 130 runs
Edgbaston, Birmingham
Umpires: Peter Hartley and Peter Willey

- Surrey Lions won the toss and elected to bat

21 August
Scorecard

Surrey Lions; 292/6 (40 overs)	v	Leicestershire Foxes; 151 (25.5 overs)
Jason Roy 131 (99); Wayne White 2/54 (7.2 overs)		Josh Cobb 51 (32); Jade Dernbach 4/7 (4.5 overs)

Surrey Lions won by 141 runs
Grace Road, Leicester
Umpires: Michael Gough and Neil Mallender

- Surrey Lions won the toss and elected to bat

21 August
Scorecard

Northamptonshire Steelbacks; 247/7 (40 overs)	v	Durham Dynamos; 251/2 (30.2 overs)
David Willey 57 (48); Paul Collingwood 2/19 (2 overs)		Phil Mustard 139* (93); Andrew Hall 1/20 (3 overs)

Durham Dynamos won by 8 wickets
County Ground, Northampton
Umpires: Rob Bailey and Jeff Evans

- Northamptonshire Steelbacks won the toss and elected to bat

29 August
Scorecard

Hampshire Royals; 302/4 (40 overs)	v	Scottish Saltires; 187 (35 overs)
James Vince 131 (110); Gordon Goudie 3/51 (7 overs)		George Worker 46 (59); Chris Wood 4/34 (8 overs)

Hampshire Royals won by 115 runs
The Rose Bowl, Southampton
Umpires: Nick Cook and Martin Saggers

- Hampshire Royals won the toss and elected to bat

29 August
Scorecard

Durham Dynamos; 325/9 (40 overs)	v	Surrey Lions; 289 (36.3 overs)
Paul Collingwood 96 (83); Chris Schofield 3/67 (8 overs)		Matthew Spriegel 86 (57); Callum Thorp 3/56 (8 overs)

Durham Dynamos won by 36 runs
Kennington Oval, London
Umpires: Neil Bainton and Jeremy Lloyds

- Durham Dynamos won the toss and elected to bat

29 August
Scorecard

Warwickshire Bears; 145 (38.3 overs)	v	Northamptonshire Steelbacks; 151/5 (31. 2 overs)
Ateeq Javid 34 (51); David Burton 3/25 (7 overs)		Kyle Coetzer 54* (64); Rikki Clarke 4/28 (8 overs)

Northamptonshire Steelbacks won by 5 wickets
Edgbaston, Birmingham
Umpires: Rob Bailey and Steve Garratt

- Warwickshire Bears won the toss and elected to bat

==== Group C ====
	Essex Eagles	Glamorgan Dragons	Gloucestershire Gladiators	Lancashire Lightning	Nottinghamshire Outlaws	Somerset	Unicorns
Essex Eagles			Essex; 118 runs	Essex; 7 wickets	Essex; 7 wickets	Somerset; 6 wickets	Essex; 8 wickets
Glamorgan Dragons	Match abandoned		Glamorgan; 4 wickets	Glamorgan; 69 runs	Nottinghamshire; 21 runs	Glamorgan; 3 wickets	Match abandoned
Gloucestershire Gladiators	Gloucestershire; 4 wickets	Gloucestershire; 3 wickets		Lancashire; 4 wickets	Nottinghamshire; 19 runs	Somerset; 59 runs (D/L)	Gloucestershire; 24 runs
Lancashire Lightning	Essex; 6 wickets	Glamorgan; 29 runs (D/L)	Lancashire; 6 wickets		Lancashire; 4 runs (D/L)	Match abandoned	Lancashire; 20 runs
Nottinghamshire Outlaws	Match abandoned	Nottinghamshire; 3 wickets	Nottinghamshire; 41 runs	Lancashire; 2 runs		Somerset; 47 runs	Nottinghamshire; 6 wickets (D/L)
Somerset	Somerset; 40 runs	Somerset; 10 runs (D/L)	Somerset; 8 wickets	Somerset; 7 wickets	Nottinghamshire; 3 wickets (D/L)		Somerset; 6 wickets
Unicorns	Essex; 8 wickets	Unicorns; 8 runs	Gloucestershire; 6 wickets	Lancashire; 8 wickets	Nottinghamshire; 7 wickets	Somerset; 4 wickets	

Pos	Team	Pld	W	L	T	NR	Pts	NRR
1	Somerset	12	9	2	0	1	19	1.008
2	Nottinghamshire Outlaws	12	7	4	0	1	15	0.260
3	Essex Eagles	12	6	3	0	3	15	0.255
4	Lancashire Lightning	12	6	5	0	1	13	−0.172
5	Glamorgan Dragons	12	4	5	0	3	11	0.161
6	Gloucestershire Gladiators	12	4	8	0	0	8	−0.488
7	Unicorns	12	1	10	0	1	3	−0.640

Source: CricketArchive

===== April =====
24 April
Scorecard

Glamorgan Dragons; 197/8 (40 overs)	v	Gloucestershire Gladiators; 198/7 (37.3 overs)
Stewart Walters 79 (98); Jon Lewis 4/41 (8 overs)		Alex Gidman 63 (75); James Harris 3/39 (8 overs)

Gloucestershire Gladiators won by 3 wickets
County Ground, Bristol
Umpires: Rob Bailey and Steve O'Shaughnessy

- Glamorgan Dragons won the toss and elected to bat.

24 April
Scorecard

Lancashire Lightning; 201/5 (40 overs)	v	Unicorns; 181/9 (40 overs)
Stephen Moore 50 (71); Glen Querl 2/45 (8 overs)		Keith Parsons 31 (50); Glen Chapple 3/25 (6 overs)

Lancashire Lightning won by 20 runs
Old Trafford, Manchester
Umpires: Mark Benson and Nigel Cowley

- Unicorns won the toss and elected to field.

24 April
Scorecard

Somerset; 270/5 (40 overs)	v	Nottinghamshire Outlaws; 223 (36 overs)
Craig Kieswetter 100 (111); Graeme White 1/19 (4 overs)		Steven Mullaney 38 (56); Ajantha Mendis 4/35 (8 overs)

Somerset won by 47 runs
Trent Bridge, Nottingham
Umpires: Jeff Evans and George Sharp

- Nottinghamshire Outlaws won the toss and elected to field.

===== May =====
1 May
Scorecard

Nottinghamshire Outlaws; 287/7 (40 overs)	v	Essex Eagles; 289/3 (39 overs)
Alex Hales 116 (101); Ravi Bopara 2/40 (8 overs)		Alastair Cook 96 (102); Samit Patel 1/43 (8 overs)

Essex Eagles won by 7 wickets
County Ground, Chelmsford
Umpires: Martin Bodenham and Richard Kettleborough

- Nottinghamshire Outlaws won the toss and elected to bat.

1 May
Scorecard

Unicorns; 218/8 (40 overs)	v	Somerset; 222/6 (38.5 overs)
Michael Thornely 47 (51); Ajantha Mendis 3/32 (8 overs)		Nick Compton 104 (105); Neil Saker 3/33 (7 overs)

Somerset won by 4 wickets
Sir Paul Getty's Ground, Wormsley
Umpires: Neil Bainton and Mark Benson

- Unicorns won the toss and elected to bat.

2 May
Scorecard

Lancashire Lightning; 190 (36.4 overs)	v	Essex Eagles; 194/3 (34.1 overs)
Karl Brown 47 (63); Lonwabo Tsotsobe 4/43 (7.4 overs)		James Foster 77 (76); Sajid Mahmood 2/28 (8 overs)

Essex Eagles won by 7 wickets
County Ground, Chelmsford
Umpires: Martin Bodenham and Richard Kettleborough

- Essex Eagles won the toss and elected to field.

2 May
Scorecard

Gloucestershire Gladiators; 195/6 (40 overs)	v	Unicorns; 171/9 (40 overs)
Chris Taylor 100* (98); Dan Wheeldon 3/31 (8 overs)		Keith Parsons 62* (77); David Payne 4/23 (8 overs)

Gloucestershire Gladiators won by 24 runs
County Ground, Bristol
Umpires: Steve Garratt and Tim Robinson

- Gloucestershire Gladiators won the toss and elected to bat.

2 May
Scorecard

Somerset; 222/2 (27 overs)	v	Glamorgan Dragons; 185/6 (19 overs)
Peter Trego 100 (59); James Harris 2/36 (5 overs)		Jim Allenby 41 (22); Lewis Gregory 2/24 (3 overs)

Somerset won by 10 runs (D/L)
County Ground, Taunton
Umpires: Peter Hartley and Steve Malone

- Somerset won the toss and elected to bat.

6 May (D/N)
Scorecard

Glamorgan Dragons; 222/7 (40 overs)	v	Essex Eagles
Alviro Petersen 88 (104); Graham Napier 4/38 (8 overs)

No result
Sophia Gardens, Cardiff
Umpires: Jeff Evans and Peter Willey

- Essex Eagles won the toss and elected to field.

8 May
Scorecard

Glamorgan Dragons; 231/5 (40 overs)	v	Lancashire Lightning; 143/7 (28 overs)
Gareth Rees 110 (103); Stephen Parry 3/46 (8 overs)		Karl Brown 48 (48); Will Owen 3/24 (6 overs)

Glamorgan Dragons won by 29 runs (D/L)
Old Trafford, Manchester
Umpires: Michael Gough and David Millns

- Glamorgan Dragons won the toss and elected to bat.

8 May
Scorecard

Gloucestershire Gladiators; 213 (40 overs)	v	Somerset; 219/2 (34 overs)
Alex Gidman 66 (84); Lewis Gregory 4/27 (8 overs)		Craig Kieswetter 108* (102); Ed Young 1/36 (8 overs)

Somerset won by 8 wickets
County Ground, Taunton
Umpires: George Sharp and John Steele

- Somerset won the toss and elected to bat.

8 May
Scorecard

Unicorns; 137 (37.5 overs)	v	Essex Eagles; 140/2 (34.1 overs)
Chris Benham 58 (71); Tim Phillips 5/28 (8 overs)		Mark Pettini 48* (100); Neil Saker 1/22 (6 overs)

Essex Eagles won bu 8 wickets
Victory Ground, Nowton Road, Bury St Edmunds
Umpires: Paul Baldwin (Ger) and Jeremy Lloyds

- Unicorns won the toss and elected to bat.

15 May
Scorecard

Lancashire Lightning; 248/6 (40 overs)	v	Somerset; 252/3 (32 overs)
Steven Croft 107 (109); Lewis Gregory 4/40 (7 overs)		Marcus Trescothick 111* (79); Simon Kerridan 1/39 (8 overs)

Somerset won by 7 wickets
County Ground, Taunton
Umpires: Rob Bailey and Trevor Jesty

- Somerset won the toss and elected to field.

15 May
Scorecard

Unicorns; 200/4 (40 overs)	v	Nottinghamshire Outlaws; 204/3 (33.3 overs)
Michael Thornely 97 (95); Paul Franks 2/32 (6 overs)		Adam Voges 60* (56); Amar Rashid 1/34 (8 overs)

Nottinghamshire Outlaws won by 7 wickets
Sir Paul Getty's Ground, Wormsley
Umpires: Martin Bodenham and Nick Cook

- Nottinghamshire Outlaws won the toss and elected to field.

15 May
Scorecard

Gloucestershire Gladiators; 154/8 (40 overs)	v	Glamorgan Dragons; 155/6 (38.2 overs)
Will Gidman 40* (53); Dean Cosker 4/30 (8 overs)		Gareth Rees 59 (100); David Payne 2/22 (8 overs)

Glamorgan Dragons won by 4 wickets
Sophia Gardens, Cardiff
Umpires: Mark Benson and David Millns

- Gloucestershire Gladiators won the toss and elected to bat.

22 May
Scorecard

Unicorns; 183/9 (40 overs)	v	Essex Eagles; 184/2 (37.4 overs)
Chris Benham 54* (85); Chris Wright 4/20 (88 overs)		Mark Pettini 88* 106); Dan Wheeldon 1/25 (8 overs)

Essex Eagles won by 8 wickets
County Ground, Chelmsford
Umpires: Steve Garratt and John Steele

- Essex Eagles won the toss and elected to field.

22 May
Scorecard

Lancashire Lightning; 145/8 (25 overs)	v	Nottinghamshire Outlaws; 142 (26.5 overs)
Steven Croft 41 (40); Andre Adams 2/23 (6 overs)		Chris Read 59 (51); Sajid Mahmood 4/24 (6 overs)

Lancashire Lightning won by 4 runs (D/L)
Old Trafford, Manchester
Umpires: Neil Bainton and Trevor Jesty

- Nottinghamshire Outlaws won the toss and elected to field.

25 May (D/N)
Scorecard

Nottinghamshire Outlaws; 270/9 (40 overs)	v	Gloucestershire Gladiators; 229 (36.5 overs)
Adam Voges 74 (60); Alex Gidman 3/24 (5 overs)		Ed Young 50 (38); Paul Franks 5/43 (6.5 overs)

Nottinghamshire Outlaws won by 41 runs
Trent Bridge, Nottingham
Umpires: Rob Bailey and Nick Cook

- Nottinghamshire Outlaws won the toss and elected to bat.

===== July =====
17 July
Scorecard

Glamorgan Dragons; 45/2 (11.1 overs)	v	Unicorns
Jim Allenby 16 (20); Neil Saker 1/19 (5 overs)

No result
Sophia Gardens, Cardiff
Umpires: Mark Benson and Neil Mallender

- Unicorns won the toss and elected to field

17 July
Scorecard

Nottinghamshire Outlaws; 127/7 (23 overs)	v	Essex Eagles
Riki Wessels 35 (42); Ravi Bopara 3/27 (6 overs)

No result
Trent Bridge, Nottingham
Umpires: Peter Hartley and Richard Illingworth

- Essex Eagles won the toss and elected to field

18 July
Scorecard

Unicorns; 157/6 (39 overs)	v	Nottinghamshire Outlaws; 122/4 (26.2 overs)
James Campbell 49 (71); Paul Franks 3/26 (8 overs)		Adam Voges 54 (60); Glen Querl 2/33 (6 overs)

Nottinghamshire Outlaws win by 6 wickets (D/L)
Trent Bridge, Nottingham
Umpires: Richard Illingworth and Martin Saggers

- Nottinghamshire Outlaws won the toss and elected to field

18 July (D/N)
Scorecard

Lancashire Lightning; 39/3 (7.4 overs)	v	Somerset
Steven Croft 26 (18); Alfonso Thomas 1/1 (1 over)

No result
Old Trafford, Manchester
Umpires: Peter Hartley and David Millns

- Lancashire Lightning won the toss and elected to bat first.

20 July (D/N)
Scorecard

Glamorgan Dragons; 251/8 (38 overs)	v	Essex Eagles; 53/2 (6.2 overs)
Gareth Rees 101 (105); Chris Wright 3/38 (7 overs)		Owais Shah 25* (15); Simon Jones 2/9 (2 overs)

No result
County Ground, Chelmsford
Umpires: Steve Garratt and Richard Illingworth

- Essex Eagles won the toss and elected to field.

24 July
Scorecard

Nottinghamshire Outlaws; 266 (39.4 overs)	v	Gloucestershire Gladiators; 247/9 (40 overs)
Alex Hales 61 (32); Jack Taylor 3/50 (7.4 overs)		Ian Cockbain 79 (84); Luke Fletcher 3/39 (8 overs)

Nottinghamshire Outlaws won by 19 runs
College Ground, Cheltenham
Umpires: Martin Bodenham and Michael Gough

- Nottinghamshire Outlaws won the toss and elected to bat.

24 July
Scorecard

Unicorns; 179 (39.3 overs)	v	Lancashire Lightning; 182/2 (28 overs)
Michael Thornely 47 (38); Junaid Khan 4/29 (7.3 overs)		Steven Croft 59 (51); Luke Beaven 1/25 (6 overs)

Lancashire Lightning won by 8 wickets
Penrhyn Avenue, Rhos-on-Sea
Umpires: Steve Garratt and Peter Willey

- Unicorns won the toss and elected to bat.

26 July
Scorecard

Gloucestershire Gladiators; 196/6 (35 overs)	v	Essex Eagles; 195 (37.5 overs)
Ian Cockbain 48* (61); Ravi Bopara 3/30 (8 overs)		Tim Phillips 58* (64); James Fuller 4/33 (8 overs)

Gloucestershire Gladiators won by 4 wickets
College Ground, Cheltenham
Umpires: Nigel Llong and George Sharp

- Essex Eagles won the toss and elected to bat.

31 July
Scorecard

Essex Eagles; 140/9 (40 overs)	v	Somerset; 141/4 (29.5 overs)
Graham Napier 29 (38); Murali Kartik 2/24 (8 overs)		Murali Kartik 40 (53); Tim Phillips 3/28 (7 overs)

Somerset won by 6 wickets
Garon Park, Southend-on-Sea
Umpires: Michael Gough and Peter Willey

- Essex Eagles won the toss and elected to bat

31 July
Scorecard

Glamorgan Dragons; 260/8 (40 overs)	v	Nottinghamshire Outlaws; 281/6 (40 overs)
Gareth Rees 90 (90); Samit Patel 4/37 (8 overs)		Adam Voges 103* (76); Will Owen 1/22 (3 overs)

Nottinghamshire Outlaws won by 21 runs
St Helen's, Swansea
Umpires: Stephen Gale and Peter Hartley

- Nottinghamshire Outlaws won the toss and elected to bat

31 July
Scorecard

Gloucestershire Gladiators; 290/4 (40 overs)	v	Lancashire Lightning; 294/6 (38.1 overs)
Alex Gidman 76 (82); Oliver Newby 2/62 (8 overs)		Paul Horton 97* (90); David Payne 2/73 (7.1 overs)

Lancashire Lightning won by 4 wickets
College Ground, Cheltenham
Umpires: Mark Eggleston and Jeremy Lloyds

- Gloucestershire Gladiators won the toss and elected to bat

===== August =====
5 August (D/N)
Scorecard

Lancashire Lightning; 236/4 (38.5 overs)	v	Gloucestershire Gladiators; 235/6 (40 overs)
Paul Horton 95* (91); Ed Young 1/37 (8 overs)		Kane Williamson 64 (75); Stephen Parry 3/40 (8 overs)

Lancashire Lightning won by 6 wickets
Old Trafford, Manchester
Umpires: David Millns and John Steele

- Gloucestershire Gladiators won the toss and elected to bat

12 August (D/N)
Scorecard

Nottinghamshire Outlaws; 200/7 (33.1 overs)	v	Glamorgan Dragons; 198/9 (35 overs)
Chris Read 68* (65); Will Owen 4/40 (7 overs)		Chris Cooke 75 (62); Paul Franks 3/33 (6 overs)

Nottinghamshire Outlaws won by 3 wickets (D/L)
Trent Bridge, Nottingham
Umpires: Neil Mallender and Steve O'Shaughnessy

- Nottinghamshire Outlaws won the toss and elected to field

14 August
Scorecard

Glamorgan Dragons; 204/7 (38.3 overs)	v	Somerset; 201/8 (40 overs)
Nick James 43 (50); George Dockrell 3/27 (8 overs)		Peter Trego 64 (84); Will Owen 4/31 (8 overs)

Glamorgan Dragons won by 3 wickets
Sophia Gardens, Cardiff
Umpires: Steve Garratt and Neil Mallender

- Somerset won the toss and elected to bat

14 August
Scorecard

Lancashire Lightning; 257/4 (40 overs)	v	Essex Eagles; 258/4 (39.4 overs)
Karl Brown 101* (86); Ravi Bopara 2/27 (6 overs)		Mark Pettini 104 (101); Oliver Newby 2/43 (5.4 overs)

Essex Eagles won by 6 wickets
Old Trafford, Manchester
Umpires: Jeff Evans and Steve O'Shaughnessy

- Essex Eagles won the toss and elected to field

14 August
Scorecard

Unicorns; 234/7 (40 overs)	v	Gloucestershire Gladiators; 238/4 (36.1 overs)
James Campbell 58 (80); Jack Taylor 3/37 (8 overs)		Alex Gidman 106* (104); Luis Reece 4/35 (7 overs)

Gloucestershire Gladiators won by 6 wickets
The Maer Ground, Exmouth
Umpires: Paul Baldwin and Trevor Jesty

- Unicorns won the toss and elected to bat

15 August (D/N)
Report

Somerset; 156/6 (19.2 overs)	v	Nottinghamshire Outlaws; 144/7 (15.5 overs)
Nick Compton 34* (32); Luke Fletcher 3/27 (3.2 overs)		Steven Mullaney 50 (30); Steven Kirby 3/27 (3 overs)

Nottinghamshire Outlaws won by 3 wickets (D/L)
County Ground, Taunton
Umpires: Neil Bainton and Nigel Llong

- Nottinghamshire Outlaws won the toss and elected to field

21 August
Scorecard

Essex Eagles; 299/7 (40 overs)	v	Gloucestershire Gladiators; 181 (31 overs)
Owais Shah 104 (98); James Fuller 3/62 (8 overs)		Chris Taylor 47 (41); David Masters 4/32 (7 overs)

Essex Eagles won by 118 runs
Castle Park Cricket Ground, Colchester
Umpires: Stephen Gale and Tim Robinson

- Essex Eagles won the toss and elected to bat

21 August
Scorecard

Glamorgan Dragons; 328/4 (33 overs)	v	Lancashire Lightning; 259 (30 overs)
Alviro Petersen 144 (89); Tom Smith 2/65 (7 overs)		Steven Croft 85 (54); Dean Cosker 4/43 (7 overs)

Glamorgan Dragons won by 69 runs
Penrhyn Avenue, Rhos-on-Sea
Umpires: Neil Bainton and John Steele

- Lancashire Lightning won the toss and elected to field

21 August
Scorecard

Somerset; 213/4 (34.1 overs)	v	Unicorns; 208/5 (40 overs)
Marcus Trescothick 53 (42); Bradley Wadlan 2/39 (8 overs)		Michael Thornely 105 (115); Steven Kirby 2/47 (6 overs)

Somerset won by 6 wickets
County Ground, Taunton
Umpires: Martin Bodenham and Richard Illingworth

- Unicorns won the toss and elected to bat

24 August (D/N)
Scorecard

Gloucestershire Gladiators; 70/6 (11.3 overs)	v	Somerset; 210/8 (30 overs)
Kane Williamson 23 (19); Steven Kirby 3/24 (4 overs)		Jos Buttler 63* (39); James Fuller 2/26 (6 overs)

Somerset won by 59 runs (D/L)
County Ground, Bristol
Umpires: Nick Cook and Jeff Evans

- Gloucestershire Gladiators won the toss and elected to field

29 August
Scorecard

Nottinghamshire Outlaws; 246/9 (40 overs)	v	Lancashire Lightning; 248/5 (40 overs)
Chris Read 64 (50); Tom Smith 4/48 (8 overs)		Tom Smith 117 (104); Darren Pattinson 2/32 (7 overs)

Lancashire Lightning won by 2 runs
Trent Bridge, Nottingham
Umpires: Steve O'Shaughnessy and George Sharp

- Lancashire Lightning won the toss and elected to bat

29 August
Scorecard

Somerset; 251/5 (40 overs)	v	Essex Eagles; 211 (35 overs)
Peter Trego 51 (55); Tom Craddock 2/38 (8 overs)		Jaik Mickleburgh 56 (58); Craig Meschede 2/16 (4 overs)

Somerset won by 40 runs
County Ground, Taunton
Umpires: Nigel Cowley and John Steele

- Somerset won the toss and elected to bat

29 August
Scorecard

Unicorns; 192 (40 overs)	v	Glamorgan Dragons; 184 (39.2 overs)
James Ord 53 (67); Graham Wagg 3/35 (8 overs)		Alviro Petersen 93* (112); Glen Querl 3/33 (7.2 overs)

Unicorns won by 8 runs
Sir Paul Getty's Ground, Wormsley
Umpires: Jeff Evans and Nigel Llong

- Glamorgan Dragons won the toss and elected to field

=== Knockout stage ===
Semi-finals
4 September – Taunton
Durham Dynamos	219 (39.5 overs)
Somerset	165/3 (27 overs)
11 September – The Oval
Surrey Lions	228/7 (24 overs)
Sussex Sharks	157 (22 overs)

Final
17 September – Lord's
Somerset	214 (39.2 overs)
Surrey Lions	189/5 (27.3 overs)

==== Semi-finals ====
4 September
Scorecard

Durham Dynamos; 219 (38.5 overs)	v	Somerset; 165/3 (27 overs)
Dale Benkenstein 82 (76); Steven Kirby 3/31 (5.5 overs)		Arul Suppiah 57 (44); Gareth Breese 2/27 (6 overs)

Somerset won by 39 runs (D/L)
County Ground, Taunton
Umpires: Jeff Evans and Peter Hartley
Player of the match: Peter Trego (Somerset)

- Durham Dynamos won the toss and elected to bat

4 September
Scorecard

Surrey Lions; 228/7 (24 overs)	v	Sussex Sharks; 157 (22 overs)
Tom Maynard 60 (33); Chris Liddle 4/38 (5 overs)		Chris Nash 55 (40); Chris Schofield 4/22 (4 overs)

Surrey Lions won by 71 runs
Kennington Oval, London
Umpires: Nigel Llong and Jeremy Lloyds
Player of the match: Tom Maynard (Surrey)

- Surrey Lions won the toss and elected to bat

==== Final ====
17 September
11:30
scorecard

Somerset; 214 (39.2 overs)	v	Surrey Lions; 189/5 (27.3 overs)
Jos Buttler 86 (72); Jade Dernbach 4/30 (7.2 overs)		Rory Hamilton-Brown 78 (62); Steve Kirby 2/39 (5.3 overs)

Surrey beat Somerset by 5 wickets (D/L)
Lord's, London
Umpires: Trevor Jesty and Tim Robinson
Player of the match: Jade Dernbach (Surrey)

- Somerset won the toss and decided to bat

== Statistics ==
=== Highest team totals ===
The following table lists the six highest team scores in the season.

Team	Total	Opponent	Ground
Sussex Sharks	399/4	Worcestershire Royals	Cricket Field Road Ground, Horsham
Glamorgan Dragons	328/4	Lancashire Lightning	Penrhyn Avenue, Rhos-on-Sea
Durham Dynamos	325/9	Surrey Lions	Kennington Oval, London
Worcestershire Royals	319	Sussex Sharks	Cricket Field Road Ground, Horsham
Surrey Lions	311/7	Hampshire Hawks	Whitgift School, Croydon
Hampshire Royals	307/6	Northamptonshire Steelbacks	County Ground, Northampton

=== Most runs ===
The top five highest run scorers (total runs) in the season are included in this table.

Player	Team	Runs	Inns	Avg	S/R	HS	100s	50s
Chris Nash	Sussex Sharks	649	11	72.11	108.52	124*	2	5
Ed Joyce	Sussex Sharks	583	13	53.00	102.64	120	2	2
Jason Roy	Surrey Lions	574	12	47.83	110.81	131	2	4
Gareth Rees	Glamorgan Dragons	567	12	56.70	93.10	110*	2	4
Alviro Petersen	Glamorgan Dragons	547	12	54.70	98.20	144	1	2

=== Highest scores ===
This table contains the top five highest scores of the season made by a batsman in a single innings.

Player	Team	Score	Balls	4s	6s	Opponent	Ground
Moeen Ali	Worcestershire Royals	158	92	20	7	Sussex Sharks	Cricket Field Road Ground, Horsham
Ben Stokes	Durham Dynamos	150*	113	9	7	Warwickshire Bears	Edgbaston, Birmingham
Alviro Petersen	Glamorgan Dragons	144	89	9	10	Lancashire Lightning	Penrhyn Avenue, Rhos-on-Sea
Phil Mustard	Durham Dynamos	139*	93	13	7	Northamptonshire Steelbacks	County Ground, Northampton
Sean Ervine	Hampshire Royals	136	106	14	3	Leicestershire Foxes	The Rose Bowl, Southampton

=== Most wickets ===
The following table contains the five leading wicket-takers of the season.

Player	Team	Wkts	Mts	Ave	S/R	Econ	BBI
Shane Mott	Netherlands	21	9	15.95	19.9	4.80	4/29
Adil Rashid	Yorkshire Carnegie	21	11	20.33	22.8	5.33	3/30
Mitchell Claydon	Durham Dynamos	21	12	21.28	22.4	5.69	3/16
Chris Liddle	Sussex Sharks	20	11	17.20	19.2	5.37	5/18
Jade Dernbach	Surrey Lions	19	8	15.47	18.2	5.08	4/7

=== Best bowling figures ===
This table lists the top five players with the best bowling figures in the season.

Player	Team	Overs	Figures	Opponent	Ground
Chris Liddle	Sussex Sharks	8.0	5/18	Netherlands	VRA Ground, Amstelveen
Andrew Hall	Northamptonshire Steelbacks	7.1	5/22	Leicestershire Foxes	County Ground, Northampton
Tim Phillips	Essex Eagles	8.0	5/28	Unicorns	Victory Ground, Bury St Edmunds
Steven Finn	Middlesex Panthers	8.0	5/33	Derbyshire Falcons	Lord's, London
Paul Franks	Nottinghamshire Outlaws	6.5	5/43	Gloucestershire Gladiators	Trent Bridge, Nottingham

== See also ==
- ECB 40
