= 2011 English cricket season =

County Championship
- Champions: Lancashire
- Runners-up: Warwickshire
- Most runs: Marcus Trescothick (1,673)
- Most wickets: David Masters (93)

Clydesdale Bank 40
- Champions: Surrey Lions
- Runners-up: Somerset
- Most runs: Chris Nash (649)
- Most wickets: Shane Mott (21)

Friends Life t20
- Champions: Leicestershire Foxes
- Runners-up: Somerset
- Most runs: Andrew McDonald (584)
- Most wickets: Tim Phillips (26)

PCA Player of the Year
- Marcus Trescothick

Wisden Cricketers of the Year
- Tamim Iqbal; Eoin Morgan; Chris Read; Jonathan Trott; Not awarded

The 2011 English cricket season was the 112th in which the County Championship had been an official competition. It began on 2 April with a round of university matches, and continued until the final of the Clydesdale Bank 40 on 17 September. Three major domestic competitions were contested: the 2011 County Championship won by Lancashire, the 2011 Clydesdale Bank 40 won by Surrey and the 2011 Friends Life t20 won by Leicestershire.

During this season, two Test teams toured England: Sri Lanka lost both the Test series (1–0) and the One Day International (ODI) series (3–2), but won the solitary Twenty20 International (T20I). India also toured, losing to England in four Tests. Five ODIs were played, England winning 3–0 with one tie and one no result. England also won the single T20I match.

== Roll of honour ==
Test series

- England v Sri Lanka: 3 Tests – England won 1–0.
- England v India: 4 Tests – England won 4–0.

ODI series

- England v Sri Lanka: 5 ODIs – England won 3–2.
- England in Ireland: Only ODI – England won by 11 runs.
- England v India: 5 ODIs – England won 3–0.

Twenty20 International series

- England v Sri Lanka: Only T20I – Sri Lanka won by 9 wickets.
- England v India: Only T20I – England won by 6 wickets.
- England v West Indies: 2 T20Is – Series drawn 1-1

County Championship

- Division One winners: Lancashire
- Division Two winners: Middlesex
- Relegated from Division One: Yorkshire and Hampshire
- Promoted from Division Two: Middlesex and Surrey

Clydesdale Bank 40 (CB40)

- Winners: Surrey Lions
- Runners-up: Somerset

Friends Life t20

- Winners: Leicestershire Foxes
- Runners-up: Somerset

Minor Counties Championship

- Winners: Devon

MCCA Knockout Trophy

- Winners: Berkshire

Second XI Championship

- Winners: Warwickshire II

Second XI Trophy

- Winners: Nottinghamshire II

Wisden Cricketers of the Year

- Tamim Iqbal, Eoin Morgan, Chris Read, Jonathan Trott, Not awarded

PCA Player of the Year

- Marcus Trescothick

PCA Most Valuable Player of the Year

- Marcus Trescothick

== County Championship ==
=== Divisions ===
Division One	Division Two
Durham	Derbyshire
Hampshire	Essex
Lancashire	Glamorgan
Nottinghamshire	Gloucestershire
Somerset	Kent
Sussex	Leicestershire
Warwickshire	Middlesex
Worcestershire	Northamptonshire
Yorkshire	Surrey

Icon
Team promoted from Division Two
Team relegated from Division One

=== Division One Standings ===
- Pld = Played, W = Wins, L = Losses, D = Draws, T = Ties, A = Abandonments, Bat = Batting points, Bowl = Bowling points, Ded = Deducted points, Pts = Points.

Team	Pld	W	L	T	D	A	Bat	Bowl	Ded	Pts
Lancashire (C)	16	10	4	0	2	0	37	44	1.0	246
Warwickshire	16	9	4	0	3	0	46	45	9.0	235
Durham	16	8	4	0	4	0	47	45	0.0	232
Somerset	16	6	7	0	3	0	45	39	0.0	189
Sussex	16	6	6	0	4	0	34	40	0.0	182
Nottinghamshire	16	5	6	0	5	0	35	43	0.0	173
Worcestershire	16	4	11	0	1	0	31	44	0.0	142
Yorkshire (R)	16	3	6	0	7	0	34	37	2.0	138
Hampshire (R)	16	3	6	0	7	0	30	36	8.0	127

=== Division Two Standings ===
- Pld = Played, W = Wins, L = Losses, D = Draws, T = Ties, A = Abandonments, Bat = Batting points, Bowl = Bowling points, Ded = Deducted points, Pts = Points.

Team	Pld	W	L	T	D	A	Bat	Bowl	Ded	Pts
Middlesex (C)	16	8	2	0	6	0	50	44	0.0	240
Surrey (P)	16	8	4	0	4	0	43	44	0.0	227
Northamptonshire	16	7	2	0	7	0	48	45	0.0	226
Gloucestershire	16	6	5	0	5	0	41	47	1.0	198
Derbyshire	16	5	6	0	5	0	42	44	0.0	181
Glamorgan	16	5	6	0	4	0	44	40	1.0	178
Essex	16	4	4	0	8	0	29	44	2.0	159
Kent	16	5	9	0	2	0	30	42	9.0	149
Leicestershire	16	1	11	0	4	0	24	36	0.0	88

== Clydesdale Bank 40 ==
=== Group stage ===
Group A

Team	Pld	W	L	T	N/R	Pts	Net R/R
Sussex Sharks*	12	8	4	0	0	16	+1.070
Middlesex Panthers^{†}	12	8	4	0	0	16	+0.213
Derbyshire Falcons^{†}	12	6	5	1	0	13	-0.079
Kent Spitfires^{†}	12	6	6	0	0	12	–0.017
Netherlands^{†}	12	5	5	1	1	12	–0.361
Yorkshire Carnegie^{†}	12	5	7	0	0	10	-0.147
Worcestershire Royals^{†}	12	2	9	0	1	5	–0.710
Teams marked * progressed to the next stage of the competition. Team marked † were eliminated from the competition. Source: CricketArchive

Group B

Team	Pld	W	L	T	N/R	Pts	Net R/R
Surrey Lions*	12	10	1	0	1	21	+1.047
Durham Dynamos*	12	9	2	0	1	19	+0.901
Northamptonshire Steelbacks^{†}	12	6	6	0	0	12	-0.304
Hampshire Royals^{†}	12	5	6	0	1	11	+0.224
Warwickshire Bears^{†}	12	5	7	0	0	10	-0.274
Leicestershire Foxes^{†}	12	2	8	0	2	6	–0.833
Scottish Saltires^{†}	12	2	9	0	1	5	–0.857
Teams marked * progressed to the next stage of the competition. Team marked † were eliminated from the competition. Source: CricketArchive

Group C

Team	Pld	W	L	T	NR	Pts	Net R/R
Somerset*	12	9	2	0	1	19	+1.008
Nottinghamshire Outlaws^{†}	12	7	4	0	1	15	+0.260
Essex Eagles^{†}	12	6	3	0	3	15	+0.255
Lancashire Lightning^{†}	12	6	5	0	1	13	-0.172
Glamorgan Dragons^{†}	12	4	5	0	3	11	+0.161
Gloucestershire Gladiators^{†}	12	4	8	0	0	8	-0.488
Unicorns^{†}	12	1	10	0	1	3	-0.640
Teams marked * progressed to the next stage of the competition. Team marked † were eliminated from the competition. Source: CricketArchive

=== Knockout stage ===
Semi-finals
4 September – Taunton
Durham Dynamos	219 (39.5 overs)
Somerset	165/3 (27 overs)
11 September – The Oval
Surrey Lions	228/7 (24 overs)
Sussex Sharks	157 (22 overs)

Final
17 September – Lord's
Somerset	214 (39.2 overs)
Surrey Lions	189/5 (27.3 overs)

== Friends Life t20 ==
=== Group stage ===
North Group

Team	Pld	W	L	T	NR	Pts	NRR
Nottinghamshire Outlaws	16	11	2	0	3	25	+1.087
Leicestershire Foxes	16	10	2	0	4	24	+0.541
Lancashire Lightning	16	9	5	1	1	20	+0.459
Durham Dynamos	16	6	6	0	4	16	+0.678
Worcestershire Royals	16	6	7	0	3	15	–0.089
Yorkshire Carnegie	16	6	7	0	3	15	–0.548
Derbyshire Falcons	16	4	8	1	3	12	–0.489
Warwickshire Bears	16	4	10	0	2	10	–0.598
Northamptonshire Steelbacks	16	2	11	0	3	7	–0.912

South Group

Team	Pld	W	L	T	NR	Pts	NRR
Hampshire Royals^{[nb1]}	16	11	2	0	3	23	+1.093
Sussex Sharks	16	9	5	0	2	20	+0.061
Kent Spitfires	16	9	5	0	2	20	–0.205
Somerset	16	7	4	1	4	19	+0.978
Surrey Lions	16	7	6	0	3	17	+0.131
Essex Eagles	16	7	7	0	2	16	–0.086
Glamorgan Dragons	16	5	9	0	2	12	+0.045
Gloucestershire Gladiators	16	4	11	0	1	9	–0.473
Middlesex Panthers	16	2	12	1	1	6	–1.247

The Hampshire Royals began the tournament on minus two points for a poor pitch from last season.

=== Knockout stage ===
Quarter-finals
N1	Nottinghamshire Outlaws	169/5
S4	Somerset	172/4
N4	Durham Dynamos	99
S1	Hampshire Royals	154/6
N2	Leicestershire Foxes	206/7
S3	Kent Spitfires	203/3
N3	Lancashire Lightning	152/8
S2	Sussex Sharks	132/8

Semi-finals
S4	Somerset (D/L; Super Over)	94/5
S1	Hampshire Royals	138/4
N2	Leicestershire Foxes (D/L; Super Over)	132/6
N3	Lancashire Lightning	79/6

Final
S4	Somerset	127/9
N2	Leicestershire Foxes	145/6

== See also ==
- Sri Lankan cricket team in England in 2011
- Indian cricket team in England in 2011
