= Alex Wakely =

English cricketer (born 1988)

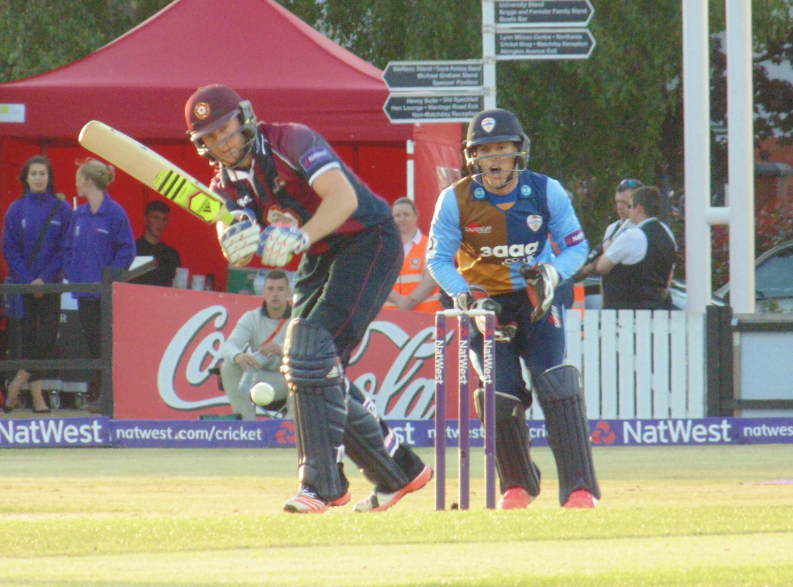

Personal information
- Full name: Alex George Wakely
- Born: 3 November 1988 (age 38); Hammersmith, London, England
- Batting: Right-handed
- Bowling: Right arm medium Right-arm off break
- Role: Middle Order Batsman

Domestic team information
- Years: Team
- 2004–2021: Northamptonshire (squad no. 8)
- 2004–2009: Bedfordshire
- FC debut: 13 July 2007 Northants v Somerset
- Last FC: 8 April 2021 Northants v Kent
- LA debut: 4 May 2005 Bedfordshire v Sussex
- Last LA: 20 June 2019 Northants v Australia A

Career statistics
Competition	FC	LA	T20
Matches	148	90	133
Runs scored	6,880	2,532	2,597
Batting average	31.27	32.88	26.23
100s/50s	9/37	2/18	0/14
Top score	123	109*	64
Balls bowled	509	136	12
Wickets	6	5	0
Bowling average	71.00	26.20	–
5 wickets in innings	0	0	–
10 wickets in match	0	0	–
Best bowling	2/62	2/14	–
Catches/stumpings	98/–	32/–	42/–
- Source: Cricinfo, 26 May 2021

Alex George Wakely (born 3 November 1988) is an English former cricketer who played for Northamptonshire and was also a former captain of the England under-19s. He is a right-hand batsman, bowls off-breaks and sometimes medium pace bowling. In May 2021, Wakely announced his retirement from all forms of cricket.

== Personal life ==
Born 3 November 1988 in Hammersmith, London, Wakely attended Bedford School. While at the school Wakely was coached by the former England batsman Derek Randall. After his A-levels, Wakely chose to focus on playing cricket professionally, and being a part time pianist.

== Career ==
=== Domestic ===
In 2004, Wakely joined the staff of Northamptonshire whilst still in full-time education. He scored 81* on his Northamptonshire Second XI debut aged just 15. In July 2007, he made his first-class debut for Northamptonshire against Somerset. He made scores of 38 and 66, as well as taking two wickets including that of Marcus Trescothick. He played three more first-class matches in 2007 but after scoring 55 against Nottinghamshire he managed only single figure scores in his last five innings. After that poor run of form, he had a spell in the second XI before returning to the first XI in 2009. On 16 June that year, Wakely scored his maiden first-class century against Glamorgan, scoring 113*. For the 2010 season, Wakely was given more of a first team role and began to realise his potential with a century against Middlesex at Lord's.

For the 2013 season, Wakely captained the Northants team in limited overs cricket. This proved to be a successful move; the team finished second in its group in the 40 over league, and won the T20 competition. Wakely played in all of the T20 matches that season and played a key role in the final, scoring 59 from 30 balls.

He missed the whole of the 2014 season because of an Achilles tendon injury that he received during the club's pre-season tour of Barbados.

He returned for the 2015 season recovered, and having been appointed captain in all forms of cricket. He scored two first-class centuries in the season, including a personal highest score of 123 against Leicestershire. Northants once again reached the final of the T20 competition, but this time lost to Lancashire. The next year, Northants returned to Twenty20 finals day with Wakely again captain, and were this time victorious. He was involved in century partnerships in both the semi-final and the final. In the semi, against Notts he and Ben Duckett took Northants from 15/3 to 138/4, himself scoring 53 from 45 balls. The final was versus Durham, and Wakely came in to bat with the score at 9/3, and shared in a partnership of 120 with Josh Cobb.

=== International ===
Wakely was picked for the England under-19s tour of Sri Lanka in 2006/07. He scored England's only century of the tri-nation series with 108 from 140 balls against Sri Lanka. In August, he scored a century on his 'Test' debut for England under-19s against Pakistan. On 1 October 2007, he was selected as the England under-19s captain for the 2008 World Cup
