= Maurice Holmes =

Maurice Holmes may refer to:

- Maurice Holmes (harness racer) (1909–1998), driver of standardbred racehorses in New Zealand
- Maurice Holmes (cricketer) (born 1990), English cricketer
- Sir Maurice Holmes (barrister) (1911–1997), barrister and Chairman of the London Transport Board
- Sir Maurice Gerald Holmes (1885–1964), British civil servant
