= James Campbell (English cricketer) =

English cricketer

Personal information
- Full name: James Robert Alexander Campbell
- Born: 25 November 1988 (age 37); Dorchester, Dorset, England
- Batting: Right-handed
- Bowling: Right-arm medium

Domestic team information
- Years: Team
- 2011–present: Staffordshire
- 2011: Unicorns

Career statistics
Competition	List A
Matches	10
Runs scored	226
Batting average	25.11
100s/50s	–/1
Top score	58
Balls bowled	6
Wickets	–
Bowling average	–
5 wickets in innings	–
10 wickets in match	–
Best bowling	–
Catches/stumpings	–/–
- Source: Cricinfo, 21 September 2011

James Robert Alexander Campbell (born 25 November 1988) is an English cricketer. Campbell is a right-handed batsman who bowls right-arm medium pace. He was born in Dorchester, Dorset.

Campbell had previously played Second XI cricket for Somerset and Gloucestershire, but had failed to make any first team appearances for either county. In 2011, he joined the Unicorns to play in the Clydesdale Bank 40. He made his List A debut for the team against Gloucestershire. He made nine further appearances in the 2011 competition, the last of which came against Glamorgan. In his ten matches he scored 226 runs at an average of 25.11, with a high score of 58, which was made against Gloucestershire at The Maer.

Also in the 2011 season, Campbell was signed by Staffordshire as cover for Navdeep Poonia. He made his debut for the county in the MCCA Knockout Trophy against Northumberland and has gone on to make three appearances in the Minor Counties Championship.
