= Tom Sharp (cricketer) =

English cricketer

Personal information
- Full name: Thomas Granville Sharp
- Born: 7 November 1977 (age 49); Truro, Cornwall, England
- Batting: Right-handed
- Bowling: Right-arm off break

Domestic team information
- Years: Team
- 1999–2015: Cornwall
- 2010: Unicorns
- LA debut: 4 May 1999 Cornwall v Cumberland
- Last LA: 8 August 2010 Unicorns v Somerset

Career statistics
Competition	List A
Matches	10
Runs scored	263
Batting average	26.30
100s/50s	0/2
Top score	61
Balls bowled	114
Wickets	3
Bowling average	30.33
5 wickets in innings	0
10 wickets in match	0
Best bowling	2/33
Catches/stumpings	2/–
- Source: CricketArchive, 9 August 2010

Thomas Granville Sharp (born 7 November 1977) is an English cricketer born at Truro in Cornwall whoo has played in the Cornwall Cricket League . Before joining the Unicorns squad during the 2010 Clydesdale Bank 40 competition, Sharp played nine List A matches for Cornwall, for whom he also played in the Minor Counties Cricket Championship.
