= Atiq Chishti =

English first-class cricketer

Personal information
- Full name: Atiq-ur-Rehman Chishti
- Born: 8 November 1981 (age 45); Lahore, Punjab, Pakistan
- Batting: Right-handed
- Bowling: Right-arm medium-fast

Domestic team information
- Years: Team
- 2011–present: Staffordshire
- 2010: Unicorns
- 2010: Herefordshire
- 2007-2009: Shropshire

Career statistics
Competition	List A
Matches	2
Runs scored	29
Batting average	14.50
100s/50s	–/–
Top score	29
Balls bowled	–
Wickets	–
Bowling average	–
5 wickets in innings	–
10 wickets in match	–
Best bowling	–
Catches/stumpings	1/–
- Source: Cricinfo, 27 November 2010

Atiq-ur-Rehman Chishti (born 8 November 1981) is an English first-class cricketer. Chishti is a right-handed batsman who bowls right-arm medium-fast. He was born in Lahore, Punjab.

Chishti made his Minor Counties Championship debut for Shropshire in 2007 against Berkshire. From 2007 to 2008, he represented the county in 17 Championship matches, the last of which came against Cheshire. It was for Shropshire that he made his debut in the MCCA Knockout Trophy against Cheshire in 2008. From 2008 to 2009, he represented the county in 7 Trophy matches, the last of which came against Oxfordshire.

In 2010, he joined Herefordshire. He made his Minor Counties Championship debut for the county against Wales Minor Counties. During the 2010 season, he played 4 further Championship matches, as well as 2 MCCA Knockout Trophy matches.

Also in 2010 Chishti was called in to the Unicorns squad as a replacement for Ed Young. He represented the team in 2 List A matches against Surrey and Worcestershire in the 2010 Clydesdale Bank 40. He joined Staffordshire in 2011.

In the past, Chishti has played Second XI cricket for the Somerset Second XI, the Leicestershire Second XI and the Worcestershire Second XI.
