= Jayden Levitt =

South African-born English cricketer

Personal information
- Full name: Jayden Ross Levitt
- Born: 23 June 1986 (age 40); Johannesburg, Transvaal Province, South Africa
- Batting: Right-handed
- Bowling: Right-arm off break

Domestic team information
- Years: Team
- 2011: Unicorns
- 2007–2016: Wiltshire

Career statistics
Competition	List A
Matches	3
Runs scored	0
Batting average	0
100s/50s	–/–
Top score	0
Balls bowled	–
Wickets	–
Bowling average	–
5 wickets in innings	–
10 wickets in match	–
Best bowling	–
Catches/stumpings	–/–
- Source: Cricinfo, 21 September 2011

Jayden Ross Levitt (born 23 June 1986) is a South African born English cricketer. Levitt is a right-handed batsman who bowls right-arm off break. He was born in Johannesburg, Transvaal Province Levitt made his debut in Minor counties cricket for Wiltshire against Cheshire in the 2007 Minor Counties Championship. To date, he has made sixteen Minor Counties Championship and eight MCCA Knockout Trophy appearances for the county. In 2011, he joined the Unicorns to play in the Clydesdale Bank 40. He made his List A debut for the team against Gloucestershire and followed this up with two further appearances against Somerset and Glamorgan. In Levitt's three matches he scored 65 runs at an average of 21.66, with a high score of 33.
