= James Ord =

English cricketer (born 1987)

Personal information
- Full name: James Edward Ord
- Born: 9 November 1987 (age 39); Birmingham, Warwickshire, England
- Batting: Right-handed
- Bowling: Right-arm medium

Domestic team information
- Years: Team
- 2011: Unicorns
- 2009–2010: Warwickshire
- 2009: Loughborough UCCE

Career statistics
Competition	First-class	List A
Matches	2	3
Runs scored	17	82
Batting average	4.25	41.00
100s/50s	–/–	–/1
Top score	9	55
Balls bowled	–	–
Wickets	–	–
Bowling average	–	–
5 wickets in innings	–	–
10 wickets in match	–	–
Best bowling	–	–
Catches/stumpings	1/–	–/–
- Source: Cricinfo, 16 August 2011

James Edward Ord (born 9 November 1987) is an English cricketer. Ord is a right-handed batsman who bowls right-arm off break. He was born in Birmingham, Warwickshire.

While studying for his degree at Loughborough University, Ord made a single first-class appearance for Loughborough UCCE against Hampshire in 2010. In this match, he was dismissed for a single run by David Griffiths in Loughborough's first-innings, while in their second-innings he was dismissed for 9 runs by David Balcombe. In that same season he made his List A debut in the 2009 NatWest Pro40 against Middlesex. He made a further List A appearance for Warwickshire in that competition against Northamptonshire. The following season, he made his only first-class appearance for Warwickshire against Essex in the County Championship. He was dismissed for a single run in Warwickshire's first-innings by Andrew Carter, while in their second-innings he was dismissed for 6 runs by David Masters. At the end of the 2010 season, Ord along with Calum MacLeod, was released by Warwickshire.

Ord joined the Unicorns for the 2011 Clydesdale Bank 40. On his debut for the team, he scored 55 in a losing cause against Gloucestershire.
