= Vishal Tripathi =

English cricketer (born 1988)

Personal information
- Born: 3 March 1988 (age 38); Burnley, England
- Batting: Right-handed
- Bowling: Right-arm leg spin
- Role: All-rounder
- Relatives: Bharat Tripathi (brother)

Domestic team information
- Years: Team
- 2010: Northamptonshire
- 2014: Cheshire

Career statistics
Competition	FC	LA	T20
Matches	4	1	3
Runs scored	360	0	6
Batting average	32.66	0.00	6.00
100s/50s	0/2	0/0	0/0
Top score	164*	–	6
Balls bowled	36	–	–
Wickets	0	–	–
Bowling average	–	–	–
5 wickets in innings	–	–	–
10 wickets in match	–	–	–
Best bowling	–	–	–
Catches/stumpings	3/–	1/–	2/–
- Source: Cricinfo, 28 January 2025

Vishal Tripathi (born 3 March 1988) is an English former professional cricketer. He was born at Burnley in Lancashire in 1988.

He Joined Northamptonshire on a three-month trial basis on 15 March 2010.
