= Luke Beaven =

English cricketer

Personal information
- Full name: Luke Edward Beaven
- Born: 31 August 1989 (age 37); Reading, Berkshire, England
- Batting: Right-handed
- Bowling: Slow left-arm orthodox

Domestic team information
- Years: Team
- 2006–2011: Berkshire
- 2011–2013: Unicorns
- 2014: Surrey

Career statistics
Competition	FC	LA
Matches	1	27
Runs scored	2	133
Batting average	1.00	33.25
100s/50s	0/0	0/0
Top score	2	25*
Balls bowled	138	914
Wickets	2	20
Bowling average	43.00	44.50
5 wickets in innings	0	0
10 wickets in match	0	n/a
Best bowling	1/39	3/35
Catches/stumpings	1/–	5/–
- Source: ESPNcricinfo, 25 April 2017

Luke Edward Beaven (born 31 August 1989) is an English cricketer. Beaven is a right-handed batsman who bowls slow left-arm orthodox. He was born in Reading, Berkshire.

Beaven made his debut for Berkshire against Cornwall in the 2006 MCCA Knockout Trophy. To date, he has made 15 Minor Counties Championship and 8 MCCA Knockout Trophy appearances for the county. In 2011, he joined the Unicorns to play in the Clydesdale Bank 40. He made his List A debut for the team against Glamorgan and followed this up with a further appearance against Lancashire, in which he claimed his maiden List A wicket, that of Stephen Moore for the cost 25 runs from 6 overs. He made a total of five appearances in the competition, taking a total of 4 wickets at an average of 35.50, with best figures of 3/35.
