= Hawkesbury Cricket Club =

Personnel
- Captain: (Australia) TBA
- Coach: (Australia) TBA

Team information
- Founded: 1985
- Home ground: Owen Earl Oval, Bensons Lane
- Capacity: 1,000
- Official website: https://hawkesburycricket.com

Hawkesbury Cricket Club is a cricket club based in the City of Hawkesbury, New South Wales, Australia. Nicknamed the Hawks. Inaugurated in 1985. Their home grounds of Owen Earle Oval and Bensons Lane Complex, which includes all 3 grade grounds, are among the best wickets in the Sydney Grade competition. The main oval has recently been upgraded with a new picket fence.

Hawkesbury also produce regular members of NSW under-17 and 19 teams.

== Notable players ==
- Stephen O'Keefe (NSW & Aust)
- Peter Forrest (NSW, QLD & Aust)
- John Hastings (Vic & Aust)
- Scott Henry (NSW)
- Anthony Kershler (NSW)
- Shane Mott
- Aamir Jamal
