= Maurice Holmes (cricketer) =

English cricketer

Personal information
- Full name: Maurice Gibson Holmes
- Born: 19 May 1990 (age 36); Tenterden, Kent, England
- Nickname: Mozza, Maverick
- Batting: Right-handed
- Bowling: Right-arm off break

Domestic team information
- Years: Team
- 2011: Loughborough MCCU
- 2011: Warwickshire (squad no. 33)

Career statistics
Competition	First-class	List A
Matches	4	3
Runs scored	7	5
Batting average	2.33	2.50
100s/50s	–/–	–/–
Top score	4*	5
Balls bowled	471	132
Wickets	7	2
Bowling average	43.00	59.50
5 wickets in innings	–	–
10 wickets in match	–	–
Best bowling	3/46	2/47
Catches/stumpings	1/–	2/–
- Source: Cricinfo, 16 August 2011

Maurice Gibson Holmes (born 19 May 1990) is an English cricketer. Holmes is a right-handed batsman who bowls right-arm off break. He was born at Tenterden, Kent, and educated at Tonbridge School, where he was a music scholar.

Holmes first came to the public eye in 2009. At this time he was playing for the Kent Second XI, but during the 2009 World Twenty20 he bowled to the New Zealand team during their practice sessions. His bowling impressed then New Zealand coach Andy Moles and then captain Daniel Vettori, who likened his bowling to that of Muttiah Muralitharan. On the back of this he was flown out to Sri Lanka for New Zealand's 2009 tour to bowl at the New Zealand players, as well as working with New Zealand's then spin consultant, Saqlain Mushtaq.

However, it wouldn't be until 2011 while studying for his degree at Loughborough University, that he made his first-class debut for Loughborough MCCU, taking 3–46 on debut against Northamptonshire and making a further appearance against Leicestershire. Signed by Warwickshire for the 2011 season, he made his first-class debut for the county against Durham MCCU, in the process taking a wicket with his first ball. Holmes made a further first-class appearance for the county against Lancashire in the County Championship. His List A debut came against Leicestershire in the Clydesdale Bank 40 taking 2-47 from 8 overs in a narrow victory by 9 runs. Holmes made two further List A appearances for Warwickshire in 2011, against Scotland and Northamptonshire, both in the Clydesdale Bank 40.

However, in June 2011 he was twice reported by umpires for a suspected illegal bowling action, with particular concern surrounding his doosra delivery. On 8 July, the England and Wales Cricket Board suspended Holmes from bowling following an independent analysis of his bowling action, deeming it to be illegal. He was released by Warwickshire at the end of the 2011 season. Following a period of remedial work on his bowling action, it was deemed that his standard delivery was legal, but his doosra was not. Following these findings, Holmes' suspension was lifted, but he was warned against bowling his doosra in competitive county cricket.

He took a year out of his studies at Loughborough University in 2012 to concentrate on resurrecting his county career, travelling to the Global Cricket School in Pune, India, to work on his bowling action.

Soon after, however, Holmes adjourned his time in cricket to pursue a career as a practising barrister. He was called to the Bar by Lincoln's Inn in 2015, and practises from Fountain Court Chambers.
