= James Cameron (Zimbabwean cricketer) =

Personal information
- Full name: James Gair Cameron
- Born: 31 January 1986 (age 40); Harare, Zimbabwe
- Batting: Left-handed
- Bowling: Right-arm medium

Domestic team information
- Years: Team
- 2010–2012: Worcestershire (squad no. 16)

Career statistics
Competition	FC	LA	T20
Matches	34	32	36
Runs scored	1,553	823	547
Batting average	29.30	32.92	19.53
100s/50s	1/8	0/5	0/3
Top score	105	69	57
Balls bowled	893	283	185
Wickets	10	8	8
Bowling average	56.50	39.00	31.50
5 wickets in innings	0	0	0
10 wickets in match	0	0	0
Best bowling	2/18	4/44	3/22
Catches/stumpings	17/–	11/–	18/–
- Source: Cricinfo, 20 October 2012

James Gair Cameron (born 31 January 1986) is a Zimbabwean cricketer, a left-handed batsman and right-arm medium-pace bowler.

Born at Harare and educated at St George's College in the city, Cameron represented Zimbabwe at under-15 and under-19 level. At under-19 level he played in four Youth One-Day Internationals in 2004, opening the batting with Brendan Taylor; his scores were 1, 0, 84 not out and 68 (a total of 153 runs at 51.0).

During his four years of study at the University of Western Australia in Perth, he played Western Australian Grade Cricket for University CC. His time with University CC yielded a total of 2267 runs at 45.34; during the 2009–10 season he scored 608 runs in 13 innings at 60.8.

He signed for Worcestershire at the start of the 2010 season. In Worcestershire's final match of the 2010 season, Cameron scored 105, his maiden first-class century, sharing a partnership of 215 with Moeen Ali (who scored 115) to secure Worcestershire's promotion to the first division of the County Championship.

He retired from professional cricket at the end of the 2012 season to pursue a career in financial services.
