= Rory Hamilton-Brown =

English cricketer

Rory James Hamilton-Brown
Personal information
- Full name: Rory James Hamilton-Brown
- Born: 3 September 1987 (age 39); St John's Wood, London, England
- Height: 6 ft 0 in (1.83 m)
- Batting: Right-handed
- Bowling: Right-arm off break

Domestic team information
- Years: Team
- 2005–2007: Surrey
- 2007–2009: Sussex
- 2010–2012: Surrey
- 2011/12: Mashonaland Eagles
- 2011/12: Wellington
- 2013–2014: Sussex (squad no. 27)

Career statistics
Competition	FC	LA	T20
Matches	73	83	93
Runs scored	3,841	1,720	1,536
Batting average	32.55	24.92	18.28
100s/50s	8/18	2/7	0/4
Top score	171*	115	87*
Balls bowled	1,002	1,266	550
Wickets	11	32	37
Bowling average	56.72	37.84	18.97
5 wickets in innings	0	0	0
10 wickets in match	0	0	0
Best bowling	2/5	3/28	4/15
Catches/stumpings	43/–	32/–	32/–
- Source: CricketArchive, 7 January 2015

Rory James Hamilton-Brown (born 3 September 1987) is a former English first-class cricketer who last played for Sussex. Previously, he was captain of Surrey until August 2012. Playing primarily as a right-handed batsman, he was also an occasional off spin bowler.

== Early life ==
Hamilton-Brown was born in Wellington Hospital, St John's Wood, London. He was educated at Dulwich College Preparatory School and Millfield School, where he played both rugby union and cricket to a high standard.

== Domestic career ==
=== Early career ===
He first appeared for the Surrey 2nd XI aged just 16 and made his first-class debut in 2005 against Bangladesh A but failed to make an impact with the bat, gaining scores of 5 and 9.

On 17 September 2007, he was released by Surrey at his own request and joined County Champions Sussex.

In the 2009 Twenty20 Cup quarter final against Warwickshire Hamilton-Brown won the man of the match award thanks to an innings of 27 and four wickets for 15 runs. He celebrated his maiden first-class century scoring 171 not out against Yorkshire on 18 September 2009.

=== Return to Surrey ===
On 24 December 2009, it was announced that Hamilton-Brown would be returning to his home county of Surrey as captain in a three-year deal. His former Sussex captain and current Surrey manager Chris Adams had personally flown to South Africa, where Hamilton-Brown had been playing for the England performance squad. Upon signing him, Adams appointed Hamilton-Brown as captain, thereby making him the youngest captain in the current English county circuit.

In 2010 he scored 844 runs in first-class cricket at an average of 30.14, including two centuries. He also made his maiden century in a List A match, whilst scoring 478 runs at 43.45. The following season he passed one thousand runs in first-class cricket for the first time, with 1039 at an average of 37.10, with one century.

Surrey had a mediocre season in 2010 under his captaincy, but in 2011 they achieved promotion to the first division of the County Championship and also won the Clydesdale Bank 40 competition. In the final he scored 78 in 62 balls.

Following the death of his Surrey teammate Tom Maynard in June 2012, whom Hamilton-Brown shared a house with and had known since the two attended Millfield School, he took an extended break from the game on compassionate grounds, handing the captaincy over to Gareth Batty. In August Hamilton-Brown resumed playing, but announced that he was relinquishing the captaincy. It was subsequently announced that he would be leaving Surrey, the club having given him permission to find another county even though he had two years left on his contract.

=== Second Spell at Sussex ===
Hamilton-Brown re-signed for Sussex on 28 September 2012. Hamilton-Brown said: 'Losing my best friend Tom in June was indescribably painful. We were extremely close but ultimately I know I will emerge from this awful tragedy with renewed strength and purpose. 'I am delighted to be returning to Sussex, a club where I was previously very happy. I would like to thank Mark Robinson, his coaching staff, the players, management and board at Sussex for welcoming me back so warmly. 'There is nothing like feeling wanted to raise spirits and I fully intend to repay the confidence they have shown in me.' Robinson, Sussex's cricket manager, said of Hamilton-Brown: 'He is a very talented cricketer who is yet to reach his full potential, which makes him such an exciting and dangerous player.'

=== Retirement ===
Hamilton-Brown retired from cricket on 1 March 2015, after failing to recover from a wrist injury that sidelined him for much of the 2014 season.

== International career ==
He was set to lead England under-19s for the 2006–07 winter tour of Malaysia, but was unable to because he required shoulder surgery. In August 2007, he was stripped of the England Under-19 captaincy after allegedly drinking alcohol the night before a match. However, these allegations were later found to be false, so the decision was reversed by the ECB.
