= Alex Wyatt =

English cricketer

Personal information
- Full name: Alexander Charles Frederick Wyatt
- Born: 23 July 1990 (age 36); Roehampton, Middlesex, England
- Batting: Right-handed
- Bowling: Right-arm medium-fast

Domestic team information
- Years: Team
- 2009–2015: Leicestershire (squad no. 16)

Career statistics
Competition	FC	LA	T20
Matches	26	14	5
Runs scored	204	13	0
Batting average	8.86	4.33	–
100s/50s	0/0	0/0	0/0
Top score	32	9*	0*
Balls bowled	3,865	452	96
Wickets	57	11	3
Bowling average	36.40	43.45	38.33
5 wickets in innings	0	0	0
10 wickets in match	0	0	0
Best bowling	3/35	2/36	3/14
Catches/stumpings	3/–	2/–	1/–
- Source: CricInfo, 6 July 2019

Alexander Charles Frederick Wyatt (born 23 July 1990) is an English former professional cricketer. He is a right-handed batsman and right-arm bowler who played for Leicestershire County Cricket Club between 2009 and 2015.

Wyatt made his first-class cricket debut for Leicestershire against Loughborough UCCE in 2009. Playing against the West Indians in his second first-class match, he dismissed Ramnaresh Sarwan. Wyatt made a big impression in his appearances for Leicestershire during the 2009 season, particularly in the Twenty 20 Cup game against Durham. Wyatt took 3-14 from four overs, including a maiden, and took the wickets of then current England player Paul Collingwood and former Australia ODI batsman Michael di Venuto.

Wyatt suffered problems with his back in 2010, limiting his appearances to a couple of games in the CB40 competition.

At the end of the 2015 season, Wyatt was one of a number of players whose contracts were not renewed by Leicestershire.
