= Dan Wheeldon =

English cricketer

Personal information
- Full name: Daniel Maurice Wheeldon
- Born: 14 March 1989 (age 37); Nottingham, Nottinghamshire, England
- Batting: Right-handed
- Bowling: Right-arm fast-medium

Domestic team information
- Years: Team
- 2011–2012: Unicorns
- 2018: Derbyshire
- Only First-class: 22 July 2018 Derbyshire v Northamptonshire
- List A debut: 2 May 2011 Unicorns v Sussex

Career statistics
Competition	FC	LA
Matches	1	7
Runs scored	35	28
Batting average	35.00	5.60
100s/50s	0/0	0/0
Top score	33*	14
Balls bowled	78	263
Wickets	1	5
Bowling average	48.00	48.40
5 wickets in innings	0	0
10 wickets in match	0	n/a
Best bowling	1/12	3/31
Catches/stumpings	0/–	0/–
- Source: ESPNcricinfo, 23 August 2018

Daniel Maurice Wheeldon (born 14 March 1989) is an English cricketer. Wheeldon is a right-handed batsman who bowls right-arm fast-medium. He was born in Nottingham, Nottinghamshire and was educated at Wilsthorpe Business and Enterprise College.

He was a member of Derbyshire Academy and played for the Yorkshire Second XI in 2010, Wheeldon joined the Unicorns in 2011 to play in the Clydesdale Bank 40. He made his List A debut for the team against Gloucestershire. He has played 6 further List A matches for the team in 2011, the last of which came against Lancashire. He made his first-class debut for Derbyshire against Northamptonshire on 22 July 2018 in the 2018 County Championship.
