= Shane Mott =

Australian cricketer

Personal information
- Full name: Shane Michael Mott
- Born: 20 March 1985 (age 41); Australia
- Nickname: Donny, Motsman
- Batting: Left-handed
- Bowling: Left-arm fast-medium

Domestic team information
- Years: Team
- 2011: Netherlands

Career statistics
Competition	List A
Matches	9
Runs scored	65
Batting average	21.66
100s/50s	–/1
Top score	50*
Balls bowled	418
Wickets	21
Bowling average	15.95
5 wickets in innings	–
10 wickets in match	–
Best bowling	4/29
Catches/stumpings	2/–
- Source: Cricinfo, 16 November 2011

Shane Michael Mott (born 20 March 1985) is an Australian cricketer. Mott is a left-handed batsman who bowls left-arm fast-medium.

Mott made his cricket debut when nine years old for Pitt Town Sports Cricket Club, coached by Harry Stephens. Mott began playing representative cricket for Hawkesbury in the under-14 Moore Shield side which featured future Australian cricketer Steve O'Keefe. He continued to play for Hawkesbury Cricket Club in Grade Cricket, racking up 304 matches (191 in 1st Grade) and 510 wickets (337 in 1st Grade).

In April 2011, Mott made his List A debut as an overseas player for the Netherlands against Yorkshire in the Clydesdale Bank 40, with Mott scoring 50 not out in a Netherlands win. He made eight further appearances during the competition, with his final match coming against Kent in August at the St Lawrence Ground, Canterbury. Mott had a successful tournament, ending it as the competition's leading wicket taker, taking 21 wickets at an average of 15.95, with best figures of 4/29.

During the 2011 season, Mott also played as the professional overseas player for Bangor Cricket Club who play in the North Wales Premier Cricket League. Following his Clydesdale Bank 40 appearance against Kent in August, Mott appeared for Bangor against St Asaph Cricket Club. While coming in to bowl in bad conditions, Mott slipped and broke both his leg and ankle, with Bangor abandoning the match.

On 10 January 2018, Mott announced his retirement from cricket. The following 7 days was a period of mourning for the Hawkesbury Cricket Club and the Greater Hawkesbury area with an outpouring of well wishes on Mott's future endeavours.
