= Tom Craddock (cricketer) =

English cricketer

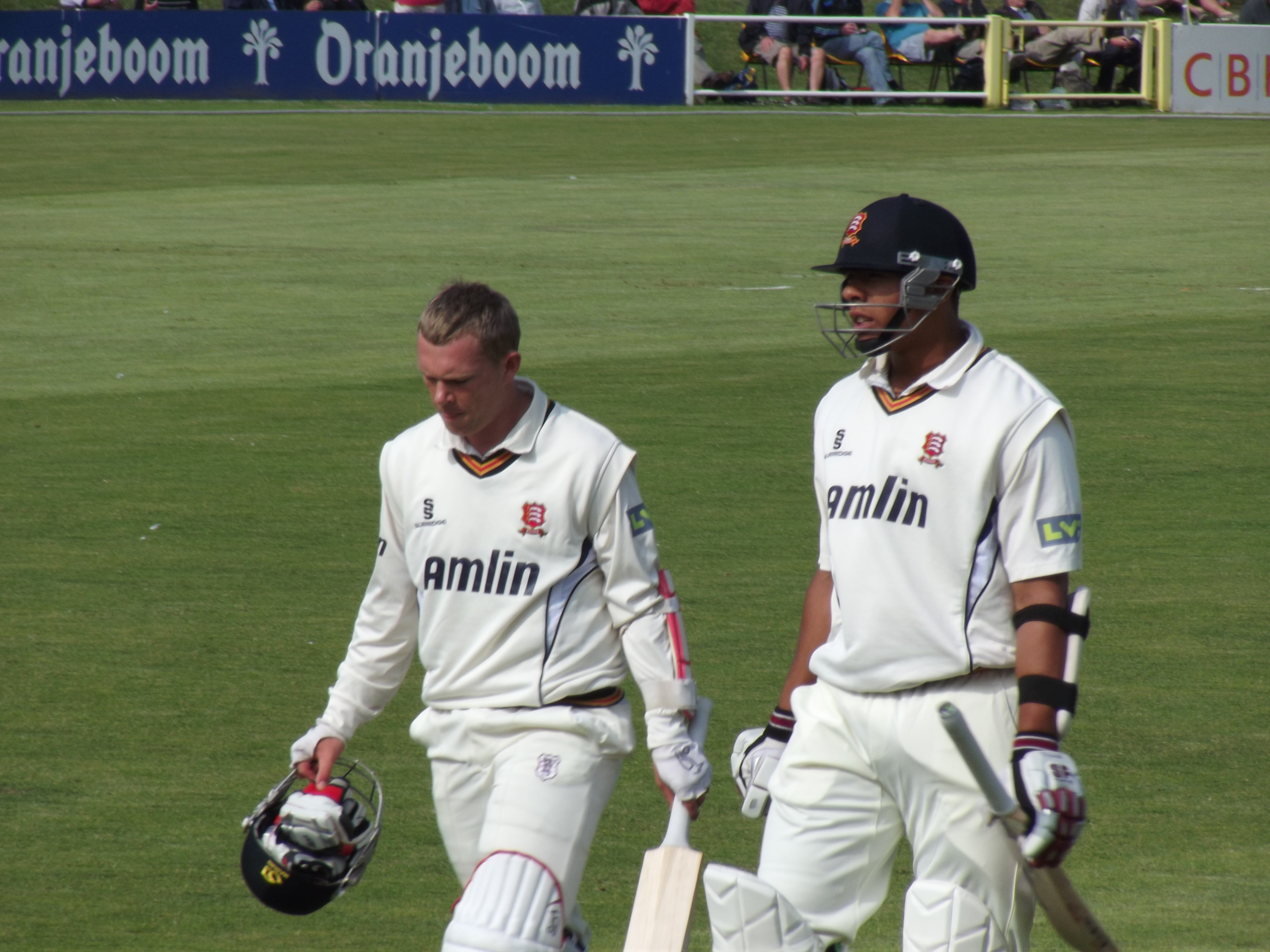
- Tom Craddock (left) and Tymal Mills

Personal information
- Full name: Thomas Richard Craddock
- Born: 13 July 1989 (age 37); Huddersfield, Yorkshire, England
- Nickname: Clads
- Batting: Right-handed
- Bowling: Right-arm Leg break

Domestic team information
- Years: Team
- 2011 – 2014: Essex (squad no. 20)

Career statistics
Competition	FC	LA	T20
Matches	17	7	2
Runs scored	135	13	–
Batting average	9.00	–	–
100s/50s	–/–	–/–	–/–
Top score	21	5*	–
Balls bowled	2239	282	12
Wickets	40	5	0
Bowling average	29.95	44.00	–
5 wickets in innings	1	–	–
10 wickets in match	–	–	–
Best bowling	5/96	2/38	–
Catches/stumpings	3/–	2/–	3/–
- Source: Cricinfo, 20 July 2013

Thomas Richard Craddock, (born 13 July 1989, Holmfirth, Huddersfield) is an English first-class cricketer who played for Essex from 2011 to 2014. He is a specialist leg spin bowler.

He started the 2011 season with the Unicorns team and impressed against Essex in two 40-over games. Essex gave Craddock a two-month trial on 2 June 2011, which they later converted into a season-long trial. He was then offered and accepted a two-year 1st team contract. He made his first-class debut against Sri Lanka in a tourist match at Chelmsford, and took his maiden first-class wicket versus Northamptonshire, also at Chelmsford.
