= Nick Harrison (cricketer) =

English cricketer (born 1992)

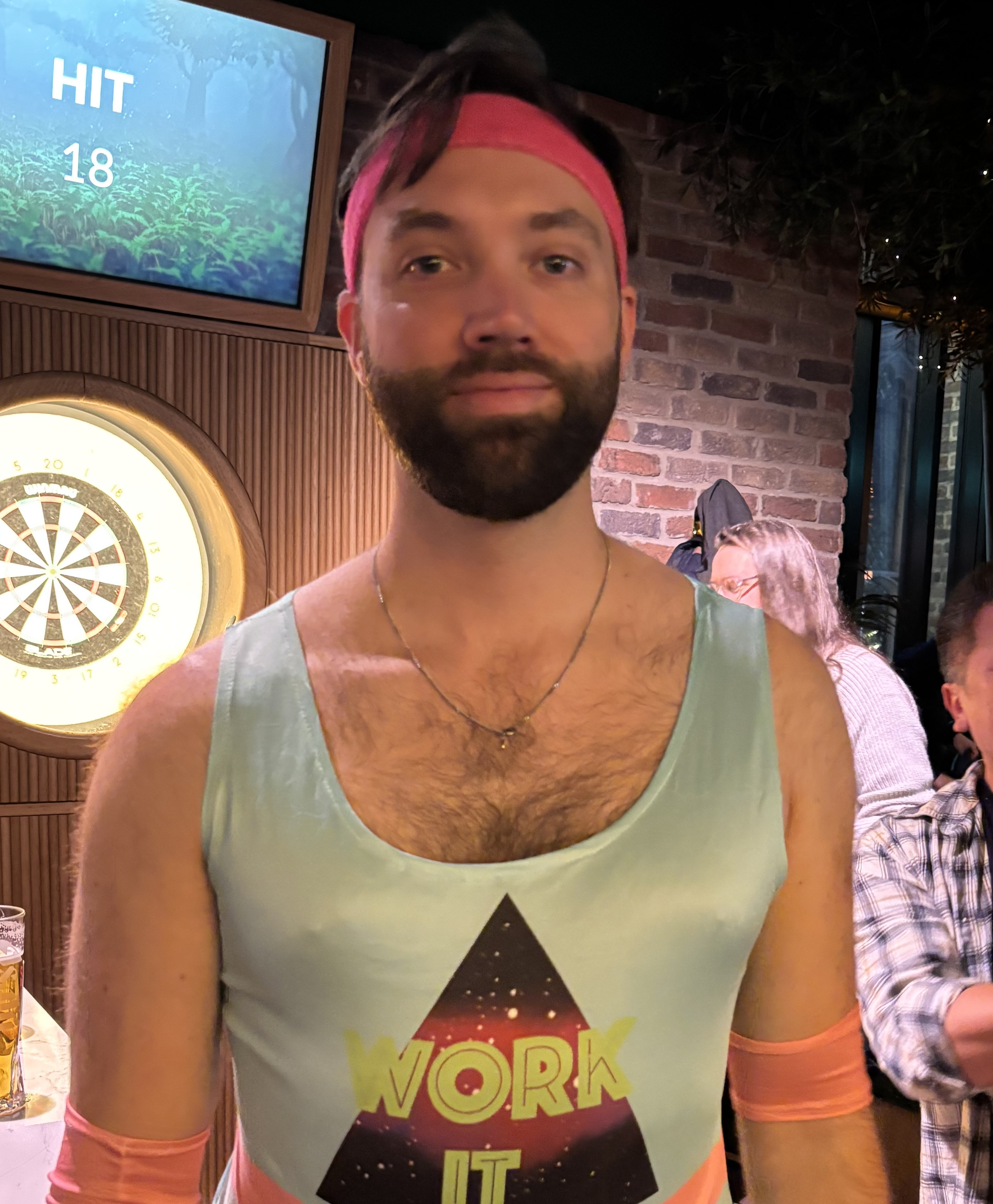

Personal information
- Full name: Nicholas Luke Harrison
- Born: 3 February 1992 (age 34); Bath, Somerset, England
- Batting: Right-handed
- Bowling: Right-arm medium

Domestic team information
- Years: Team
- 2011–: Worcestershire (squad no. 17)
- FC debut: 13 April 2012 Worcestershire v Oxford MCCU
- LA debut: 4 August 2011 Worcestershire v Derbyshire

Career statistics
Competition	FC	LA
Matches	3	7
Runs scored	12	7
Batting average	3.00	–
100s/50s	0/0	0/0
Top score	10	5*
Balls bowled	276	306
Wickets	3	8
Bowling average	58.66	45.50
5 wickets in innings	0	0
10 wickets in match	0	n/a
Best bowling	2/78	2/43
Catches/stumpings	1/–	0/–
- Source: CricketArchive, 28 February 2014

Nicholas Luke Harrison (born 3 February 1992 in Bath, Somerset) is an English cricketer active in 2013 who plays for Worcestershire. He has appeared in three first-class matches as a right handed batsman who bowls right arm medium pace.
