= Oliver Newby =

English cricketer

Personal information
- Full name: Oliver James Newby
- Born: 26 August 1984 (age 42); Blackburn, Lancashire, England
- Height: 6 ft 5 in (1.96 m)
- Batting: Right-handed
- Bowling: Right-arm fast-medium

Domestic team information
- Years: Team
- 2003–2014: Lancashire (squad no. 8)
- 2005: → Nottinghamshire (on loan)
- 2008: → Gloucestershire (on loan)
- 2014: → Essex (on loan)

Career statistics
Competition	FC	LA	T20
Matches	53	37	14
Runs scored	327	124	15
Batting average	9.61	13.77	5.00
100s/50s	0/0	0/0	0/0
Top score	38*	36*	6*
Balls bowled	6,778	1,206	190
Wickets	133	38	8
Bowling average	32.55	32.71	31.25
5 wickets in innings	1	1	0
10 wickets in match	0	0	0
Best bowling	5/69	5/35	2/34
Catches/stumpings	9/–	4/–	4/–
- Source: Cricinfo, 25 August 2015

Oliver James Newby (born 26 August 1984) is an English former cricketer who predominantly played for Lancashire. He was a right-arm fast-medium bowler with the ability to extract bounce from a cricket surface.

== Career ==
He is a product of the Lancashire Academy and made his first-class debut for the county in the 2003 season. During his debut season he played against the India A cricket team in a 50-over match at Blackpool, and took two wickets in his first two overs. After another season at Lancashire, he was loaned to Nottinghamshire for a month in the 2005 season and played in two County Championship matches for the county. He returned to Lancashire in 2006, and with several of Lancashire's fast bowlers either selected for England or injured, he received the opportunity to play in seven County Championship matches. He showed himself to be a much improved bowler, taking 19 wickets at an average of 27.52. Newby's good form continued into the 2007 season, during which he played nine first-class matches, taking 22 wickets at 30.45. He was rewarded with a new two-year contract keeping him with Lancashire until the end of the 2009 season.

At the start of the 2010 season, Newby was looking to secure a regular place in Lancashire's first team. However, in May he suffered a rupture of the anterior cruciate ligament, side-lining him for the rest of the season.
