= Chris Nash =

English cricketer (born 1983)

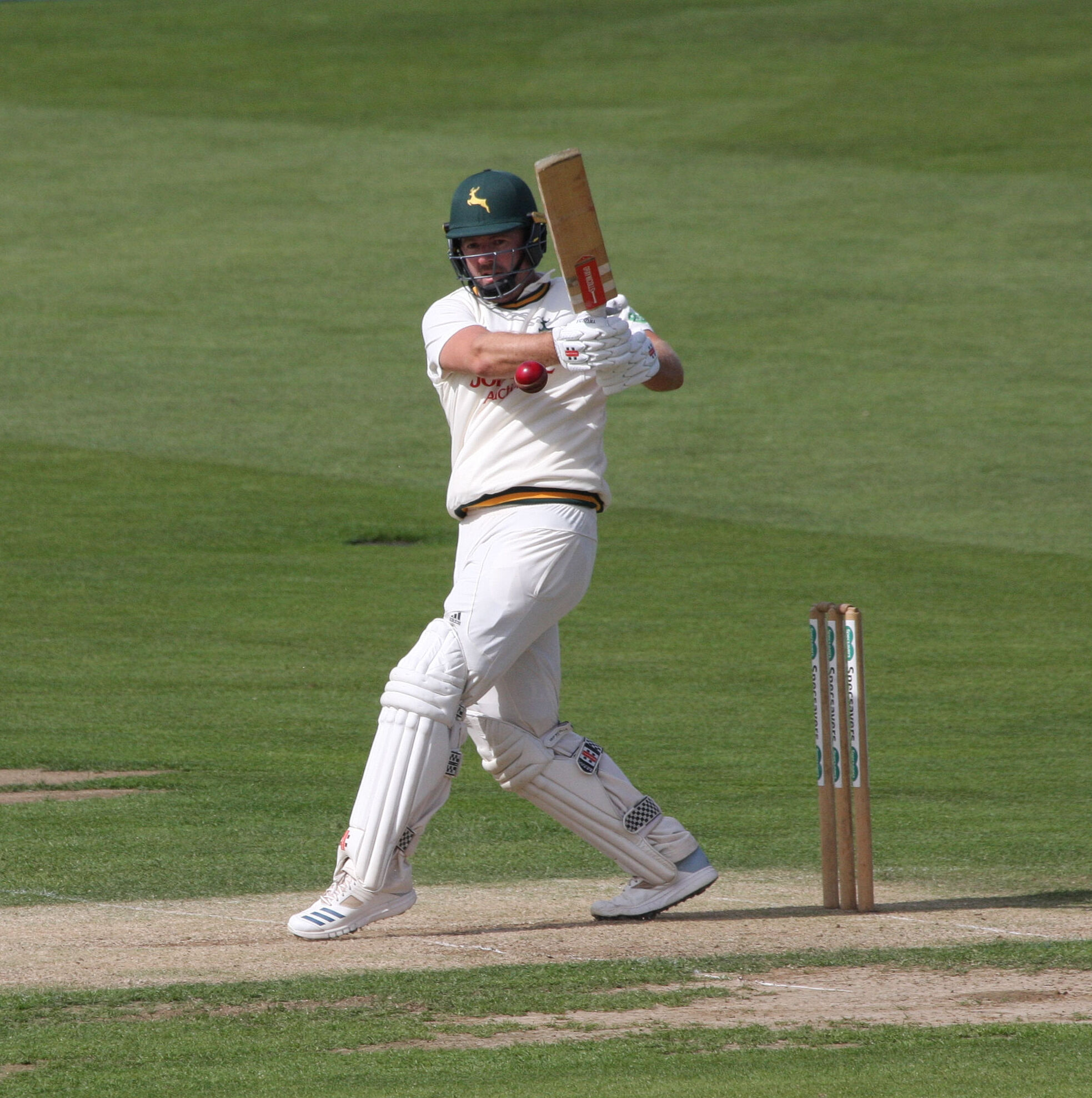

Personal information
- Full name: Christopher David Nash
- Born: 19 May 1983 (age 43); Cuckfield, Sussex, England
- Nickname: Nashy, Nashdog, Spidey
- Height: 5 ft 11 in (1.80 m)
- Batting: Right-handed
- Bowling: Right-arm off break
- Role: Opening batsman

Domestic team information
- Years: Team
- 2002–2017: Sussex (squad no. 23)
- 2003–2004: Loughborough UCCE
- 2010/11: Otago
- 2013/14: Auckland
- 2018–2020: Nottinghamshire
- FC debut: 24 July 2004 Sussex v Warwickshire
- LA debut: 4 June 2006 Sussex v Kent

Career statistics
Competition	FC	LA	T20
Matches	208	129	167
Runs scored	12,552	3,548	3,679
Batting average	37.02	30.85	26.85
100s/50s	24/68	2/24	1/23
Top score	184	124*	112*
Balls bowled	5,865	1,603	1,022
Wickets	81	45	49
Bowling average	40.85	32.82	24.93
5 wickets in innings	0	0	0
10 wickets in match	0	0	0
Best bowling	4/12	4/40	4/7
Catches/stumpings	123/–	28/–	52/–
- Source: ESPNcricinfo, 8 October 2020

Christopher David Nash (born 19 May 1983) is a retired English cricketer who represented Sussex and Nottinghamshire County Cricket Club in an 18-year professional career. He also played first-class cricket for Loughborough UCCE in 2003 and 2004 having made his first-class debut for Sussex in 2002, against Warwickshire at Edgbaston.

Nash was born at Cuckfield in Sussex in 1983. He started as an off-spin bowler, batting down the order for Sussex and Loughborough UCCE. Later he specialised as a batsman, often opening for Sussex. He was part of the Sussex team that won the County Championship in 2006 and 2007 while he played twice in the group stages in Sussex's successful Cheltenham & Gloucester Trophy campaign of 2006. He scored his maiden first-class hundred on 7 August 2008 against Lancashire at Old Trafford.

At the end of the 2017 season, Nash left Sussex after asking to be released from the final year of his contract. He subsequently signed for newly promoted Nottinghamshire on a three-year contract.

He was released by Notts at the end of the 2020 season. Shortly after he started a new job in private healthcare with DJW Health and agreed to play for Horsham in the Sussex League.
