= 2010 English cricket season =

County Championship
- Champions: Nottinghamshire
- Runners-up: Somerset
- Most runs: Mark Ramprakash (1,595)
- Most wickets: Andre Adams (68)

Clydesdale Bank 40
- Champions: Warwickshire Bears
- Runners-up: Somerset
- Most runs: Jacques Rudolph (861)
- Most wickets: Alfonso Thomas (27)

Friends Provident t20
- Champions: Hampshire Royals
- Runners-up: Somerset
- Most runs: Jimmy Adams (668)
- Most wickets: Alfonso Thomas (33)

PCA Player of the Year
- Neil Carter

Wisden Cricketers of the Year
- Tamim Iqbal; Eoin Morgan; Chris Read; Jonathan Trott

The 2010 English and Welsh cricket season was the 111th in which the County Championship had been an official competition. It began on 29 March with the Champion County match between Durham County Cricket Club and an MCC side, and ended on 18 September with the final of the Clydesdale Bank 40.

== LV County Championship ==
- Pos = Position, Pld = Played, W = Wins, L = Losses, D = Draws, T = Ties, A = Abandonments, Bat = Batting points, Bowl = Bowling points, Ded = Deducted points, Pts = Points.
- Points awarded: W = 16, L = 0, D = 3, A = 3

=== Division One ===
Team	Pld	W	L	D	T	A	Bat	Bwl	Ded	Pts
Nottinghamshire (C)	16	7	5	4	0	0	47	43	0	214
Somerset	16	6	2	8	0	0	53	41	0	214
Yorkshire	16	6	2	8	0	0	41	42	0	203
Lancashire	16	5	3	8	0	0	35	43	0	182
Durham	16	5	3	8	0	0	30	39	0	173
Warwickshire	16	6	9	1	0	0	20	47	0	166
Hampshire	16	3	6	7	0	0	47	41	0	157
Kent (R)	16	3	7	6	0	0	42	44	1	151
Essex (R)	16	2	6	8	0	0	29	43	2	126
Source:. Last updated 16 September 2010.

=== Division Two ===
Team	Pld	W	L	D	T	A	Bat	Bwl	Ded	Pts
Sussex (C)	16	8	3	5	0	0	45	47	0	235
Worcestershire (P)	16	7	4	5	0	0	39	42	0	208
Glamorgan	16	7	4	5	0	0	33	43	0	203
Leicestershire	16	7	5	4	0	0	31	44	0	199
Gloucestershire	16	6	9	1	0	0	28	47	2	172
Northamptonshire	16	6	7	3	0	0	28	34	0	167
Surrey	16	4	6	6	0	0	43	36	2	159
Middlesex	16	4	7	5	0	0	37	41	2	155
Derbyshire	16	3	7	6	0	0	30	42	0	138
Source:. Last updated 16 September 2010.

== Clydesdale Bank 40 ==
=== Knockout stage ===
Semi-finals
11 September – Taunton
Somerset	317/6 (40 overs)
Essex Eagles	217 (29.3 overs)
11 September – Scarborough
Yorkshire Carnegie	257/5 (37 overs)
Warwickshire Bears	260/6 (35.5 overs)

Final
18 September – Lord's
Somerset	199 (39 overs)
Warwickshire Bears	200/7 (39 overs)

== Friends Provident t20 ==
=== Knockout stage ===
Quarter-finals
26 July – Birmingham
Warwickshire Bears	153/5 (20 ov)
Hampshire Royals	154/5 (19.5 ov)
27 July – Chelmsford
Lancashire Lightning	183/6 (20 ov)
Essex Eagles	184/2 (19.1 ov)
26 July – Nottingham
Nottinghamshire Outlaws	141/9 (20 ov)
Sussex Sharks	128/7 (20 ov)
27 July – Taunton
Northamptonshire Steelbacks	112/6 (20 ov)
Somerset	115/3 (17 ov)

Semi-finals
14 August – Southampton
Hampshire Royals	157/4 (19.2 ov)
Essex Eagles	156/7 (20 ov)
14 August – Southampton
Nottinghamshire Outlaws	117/4 (13 ov)
Somerset (D/L)	182/5 (20 ov)

Final
14 August – Southampton
Hampshire Royals	173/5 (20 ov)
Somerset	173/6 (20 ov)
