= 2010 Clydesdale Bank 40 =

- Dates: 25 April – 18 September 2010
- Administrator: England and Wales Cricket Board
- Cricket format: Limited overs cricket (40 overs)
- Tournament format(s): Group stage and knockout
- Champions: Warwickshire Bears (1st title)
- Participants: 21
- Matches: 129
- Most runs: Jacques Rudolph (861)
- Most wickets: Alfonso Thomas (27)

The 2010 Clydesdale Bank 40 tournament was the inaugural ECB 40 limited overs cricket competition for the English and Welsh first-class counties. In addition to the 18 counties, Scotland and the Netherlands took part, as well as the Unicorns, a team of players who did not have first-class contracts.

The competition consisted of three groups of seven teams, from which the top team from each group, plus the best second-placed team, progressed to the semi-finals.

== Fixtures and results ==
=== Group stage ===
==== Group A ====
	Glamorgan Dragons	Lancashire Lightning	Somerset	Surrey Lions	Sussex Sharks	Unicorns	Worcestershire Royals
Glamorgan Dragons		Lancashire; 8 wickets	Somerset; 38 runs (D/L)	Surrey; 2 wickets	Glamorgan; 3 wickets	Match abandoned	Glamorgan; 5 wickets
Lancashire Lightning	Lancashire; 7 wickets		Somerset; 42 runs	Surrey; 8 wickets	Sussex; 4 wickets	Lancashire; 9 wickets	Lancashire; 4 wickets
Somerset	Somerset; 249 runs	Somerset; 115 runs		Somerset; 64 runs (D/L)	Somerset; 4 wickets	Somerset; 7 wickets	Somerset; 71 runs
Surrey Lions	Surrey; 39 runs (D/L)	Surrey; 2 wickets (D/L)	Somerset; 94 runs		Sussex; 6 wickets		Worcestershire; 90 runs
Sussex Sharks	Match abandoned	Sussex; 39 runs	Sussex; 17 runs (D/L)	Match tied		Sussex; 44 runs	Sussex; 159 runs
Unicorns	Unicorns; 58 runs	Lancashire; 2 wickets	Somerset; 3 wickets	Surrey; 66 runs	Unicorns; 6 wickets		Unicorns; 3 wickets
Worcestershire Royals	Worcestershire; 178 runs	Lancashire; 9 wickets	Worcestershire; 49 runs	Surrey; 30 runs (D/L)	Sussex; 5 wickets	Worcestershire; 5 wickets	

Pos	Team	Pld	W	L	T	NR	Ded	Pts	NRR
1	Somerset	12	10	2	0	0	0	20	1.491
2	Sussex Sharks	12	7	3	1	1	0	16	0.903
3	Surrey Lions	12	6	4	1	1	0	14	−0.006
4	Lancashire Lightning	12	6	6	0	0	0	12	−0.315
5	Worcestershire Royals	12	4	8	0	0	0	8	−0.196
6	Unicorns	12	3	7	0	2	0	8	−0.470
7	Glamorgan Dragons	12	2	8	0	2	1	5	−1.585

Source: Source: CricketArchive

==== Group B ====
	Derbyshire Phantoms	Essex Eagles	Gloucestershire Gladiators	Middlesex Panthers	Netherlands	Northamptonshire Steelbacks	Yorkshire Carnegie
Derbyshire Phantoms		Essex; 5 wickets (D/L)	Gloucestershire; 1 run (D/L)	Derbyshire; 81 runs (D/L)	Netherlands; 7 wickets	Northamptonshire; 5 wickets	Yorkshire; 8 runs
Essex Eagles	Derbyshire; 85 runs		Essex; 42 runs	Essex; 8 wickets (D/L)	Essex; 7 wickets	Essex; 5 wickets	Yorkshire; 10 wickets
Gloucestershire Gladiators	Gloucestershire; 51 runs	Essex; 6 wickets		Gloucestershire; 3 wickets	Gloucestershire; 9 wickets	Gloucestershire; 7 runs	Gloucestershire; 65 runs
Middlesex Panthers	Middlesex; 7 wickets	Match abandoned	Gloucestershire; 77 runs		Match abandoned	Northamptonshire; 49 runs	Yorkshire; 8 wickets
Netherlands	Derbyshire; 7 wickets	Essex; 1 run	Netherlands; 54 runs	Middlesex; 46 runs		Northamptonshire; 32 runs (D/L)	Yorkshire; 5 wickets
Northamptonshire Steelbacks	Derbyshire; 5 wickets	Essex; 9 wickets	Gloucestershire; 82 runs	Middlesex; 7 wickets	Northamptonshire; 119 runs		Yorkshire; 4 wickets
Yorkshire Carnegie	Yorkshire; 100 runs	Essex; 7 wickets	Yorkshire; 23 runs	Yorkshire; 5 runs	Yorkshire; 4 wickets	Yorkshire; 35 runs (D/L)	

Pos	Team	Pld	W	L	T	NR	Pts	NRR
1	Yorkshire Carnegie	12	10	2	0	0	20	0.384
2	Essex Eagles	12	9	2	0	1	19	0.314
3	Gloucestershire Gladiators	12	9	3	0	0	18	0.659
4	Derbyshire Phantoms	12	4	8	0	0	8	−0.037
5	Northamptonshire Steelbacks	12	4	8	0	0	8	−0.038
6	Middlesex Panthers	12	3	7	0	2	8	−0.445
7	Netherlands	12	1	10	0	1	3	−0.999

Source: CricketArchive

==== Group C ====
	Durham Dynamos	Hampshire Hawks	Kent Spitfires	Leicestershire Foxes	Nottinghamshire Outlaws	Scotland	Warwickshire Bears
Durham Dynamos		Durham; 149 runs	Kent; 31 runs	Leicestershire; 7 wickets	Nottinghamshire; 5 wickets	Durham; 63 runs (D/L)	Durham; 5 wickets
Hampshire Hawks	Hampshire; 6 wickets		Kent; 20 runs	Hampshire; 2 wickets (D/L)	Nottinghamshire; 35 runs	Hampshire; 31 runs	Warwickshire; 7 wickets
Kent Spitfires	Match abandoned	Hampshire; 2 runs		Kent; 8 wickets	Kent; 42 runs	Kent; 58 runs	Warwickshire; 6 wickets
Leicestershire Foxes	Durham; 21 runs (D/L)	Leicestershire; 14 runs	Kent; 6 wickets		Leicestershire; 47 runs	Scotland; 4 wickets	Warwickshire; 25 runs
Nottinghamshire Outlaws	Nottinghamshire; 3 runs	Nottinghamshire; 12 runs	Match abandoned	Leicestershire; 4 runs		Nottinghamshire; 75 runs	Nottinghamshire; 7 wickets
Scotland	Durham; 47 runs (D/L)	Hampshire; 8 wickets	Kent; 9 wickets	Scotland; 12 runs (D/L)	Nottinghamshire; 43 runs		Warwickshire; 7 wickets
Warwickshire Bears	Warwickshire; 7 wickets	Hampshire; 130 runs	Warwickshire; 6 wickets	Warwickshire; 41 runs (D/L)	Warwickshire; 7 wickets	Warwickshire; 4 wickets	

Pos	Team	Pld	W	L	T	NR	Pts	NRR
1	Warwickshire Bears	12	9	3	0	0	18	0.314
2	Kent Spitfires	12	7	3	0	2	16	0.774
3	Nottinghamshire Outlaws	12	7	4	0	1	15	0.348
4	Hampshire Hawks	12	6	6	0	0	12	0.006
5	Durham Dynamos	12	5	6	0	1	11	0.262
6	Leicestershire Foxes	12	4	8	0	0	8	−0.220
7	Scotland	12	2	10	0	0	4	−1.225

Source: Source: CricketArchive

=== Knockout stage ===
Semi-finals
11 September – Taunton
Somerset	312/6 (40 overs)
Essex Eagles	217 (29.3 overs)
11 September – Scarborough
Yorkshire Carnegie	257/5 (37 overs)
Warwickshire Bears	260/6 (35.5 overs)

Final
18 September – Lord's
Somerset	199 (39 overs)
Warwickshire Bears	200/7 (39 overs)

==== Semi-finals ====
11 September
12:45
Scorecard

Somerset; 312/6 (40 overs)	v	Essex Eagles; 217 (29.3 overs)
Marcus Trescothick 79 (62); Danish Kaneria 2/41 (8 overs)		James Foster 58 (38); Murali Kartik 2/40 (8 overs)

Somerset won by 95 runs
County Ground, Taunton
Umpires: Nick Cook and Peter Willey
Player of the match: Marcus Trescothick (Somerset)

- Somerset won the toss and elected to bat.

11 September
12:45
Scorecard

Yorkshire Carnegie; 257/5 (37 overs)	v	Warwickshire Bears; 260/6 (35.5 overs)
Jacques Rudolph 106 (95); Keith Barker 2/53 (7 overs)		Varun Chopra 76 (81); Adil Rashid 2/43 (8 overs)

Warwickshire won by 4 wickets
North Marine Road Ground, Scarborough
Umpires: Rob Bailey and Tim Robinson

- Warwickshire won the toss and elected to field.
- Rain reduced the match to 39 overs per team. Further rain during the first-innings reduced the match to 37 overs per team.

==== Final ====
18 September
15:00
Scorecard

Somerset; 199 (39 overs)	v	Warwickshire Bears; 200/7 (39 overs)
Nick Compton 60 (65); Imran Tahir 5/41 (8 overs)		Ian Bell 107 (95); Alfonso Thomas 3/33 (8 overs)

Warwickshire won by 3 wickets
Lord's, London
Umpires: Peter Hartley and Richard Kettleborough
Player of the match: Ian Bell (Warwickshire)

- Warwickshire won the toss and elected to field.

== See also ==
- ECB 40
- Friends Provident Trophy
- Pro40
