= ECB40 =

Clydesdale Bank 40
- Countries: England and Wales (Note: Some matches were also played in Scotland and the Netherlands)
- Administrator: ECB
- Format: 40 overs
- First edition: 2010
- Latest edition: 2013
- Tournament format: Group stage and knockout
- Number of teams: 21
- Current champion: Nottinghamshire Outlaws

The ECB40, last known as the Yorkshire Bank 40 (YB40) for sponsorship reasons, was a forty-over limited overs cricket competition for the English first-class counties. It began in the 2010 English cricket season as a replacement for the Pro40 and Friends Provident Trophy competitions. Yorkshire Bank were the last sponsors, taking over the naming rights from their parent company Clydesdale Bank for the 2013 edition. Warwickshire won the inaugural tournament. The competition was replaced by a 50-over tournament, to bring the domestic game in line with the international game from 2014 on—the Royal London One-Day Cup.

== History ==
In 2009, in light of the growth of Twenty20 cricket with the Twenty20 Cup, Indian Premier League and ICC World Twenty20, the ECB realised that the Pro40 and Friends Provident Trophy were attracting less interest. Plans began to consolidate the List A competitions into a single 40-over trophy. The competition began in the 2010 English cricket season with Clydesdale Bank, previously sponsor of the Twenty20 Cup, agreeing to a three-year sponsorship. John Perera, ECB commercial director, stated that "We are delighted to welcome Clydesdale Bank as the title sponsor for the 40-over competition particularly as it gives us an opportunity to build on an already strong working relationship. The Clydesdale Bank 40 is an exciting new competition and the format is designed to comfortably fit into the busy family weekend." Ireland and Scotland, were asked to compete, following their entry in the Friends Provident Trophy, but Ireland declined in order to concentrate on their growing international commitments; The Netherlands took their place. A new team, the Unicorns cricket team, was formed of contractless county players to compete, unpaid, alongside the 18 first-class counties, Scotland and the Netherlands.

Warwickshire beat Somerset in the final of the inaugural 2010 tournament. The format for the 2011 competition was kept the same, despite calls for the number of county matches to be reduced; fewer group matches were proposed for the 2012 season, with the addition of a quarter-final knock-out round. Unicorns competed, and held a fresh set of trials over the winter period.

== Participating teams and format ==
The competition contained three groups of seven. A random draw was used to place the teams into groups. The top team of each group, together with the second best team across all three groups, progressed to two semi-finals, the winners of which faced off in the final for the trophy. The participating teams were the 18 first-class counties plus Scotland, Netherlands and Unicorns.

- Derbyshire Falcons
- Durham Dynamos
- Essex Eagles
- Glamorgan
- Gloucestershire Gladiators
- Hampshire Royals
- Kent Spitfires
- Lancashire Lightning
- Leicestershire Foxes
- Middlesex Panthers
- Netherlands
- Northamptonshire Steelbacks
- Nottinghamshire Outlaws
- Scottish Saltires
- Somerset
- Surrey
- Sussex Sharks
- Unicorns
- Warwickshire Bears
- Worcestershire Royals
- Yorkshire Vikings

== Results ==
Year	Final			
Year	Held at	Winners	Runners-up	Result
2010; Details	Lord's, London, on 18 September 2010	Warwickshire Bears; 200 for 7 (39 overs)	Somerset; 199 (39 overs)	Warwickshire won by 3 wickets Scorecard
2011; Details	Lord's, London, on 17 September 2011	Surrey Lions; 189 for 5 (27.3 overs)	Somerset; 214 (39.2 overs)	Surrey won by 5 wickets (D/L); Scorecard
2012; Details	Lord's, London, on 15 September 2012	Hampshire Royals; 244 for 5 (40 overs)	Warwickshire Bears; 244 for 7 (40 overs)	Hampshire won by losing fewer wickets (scores level); Scorecard
2013; Details	Lord's, London, on 21 September 2013	Nottinghamshire Outlaws; 244 for 8 (40 overs)	Glamorgan Dragons 157 (33 overs)	Nottinghamshire won by 87 runs Scorecard

== Records ==
=== Team ===
- Most runs in an innings: 399/4, Sussex Sharks v Worcestershire Royals, 14 August 2011.
- Most runs batting second: 337/7, Kent Spitfires v Sussex Sharks, 19 June 2013 (world record in 40-over game).
- Lowest total in an innings: 57, Netherlands v Worcestershire, 8 June 2012.

=== Individual ===
- Most runs in an innings: 180, Ryan ten Doeschate for Essex Eagles v Scottish Saltires, 2 June 2013.
- Most runs in a tournament: 861, Jacques Rudolph for Yorkshire Carnegie (2010).
- Best bowling figures: 7/29, David Payne for Gloucestershire Gladiators v Essex Eagles, 9 May 2010 (including a hat-trick).
- Most wickets in a tournament: 28, Michael Hogan for Glamorgan (2013).

== Sponsors ==
- 2010–2012 Clydesdale Bank
- 2013 Yorkshire Bank
