= Unicorns (cricket team) =

English cricket team

Personnel
- Coach: Philip Oliver

Team information
- Founded: 2010
- Dissolved: 2018

Unicorns were a cricket team in England that was formed in 2010 specifically to play in the Clydesdale Bank 40 limited overs competition. They played in that competition until 2013 and from 2014 to 2018 the Unicorns team competed in the Second XI one-day and Twenty20 competitions. The 2014 season also included a 50-over match against Sri Lanka A. Members of the squad were all players without current full-time contracts with one of the regular first-class counties.

In only their sixth competitive game, Unicorns entered the record books for scoring the highest total in the second innings of a 40-over game, beating Sussex by successfully chasing 325.

The team was wound up at the end of the 2018 season for financial and logistical reasons.

== Formation ==
Provisionally called the ECB Recreation XI, the squad was selected by coach Philip Oliver, Mark Alleyne and Min Patel from a pool of 200 players recommended to the England and Wales Cricket Board in December 2009; the pool was reduced to 40 and 21 following training sessions over the winter. 15 members of the squad are former county cricket professionals. Team Manager Gordon Child said, "The Unicorns squad is a balance of youth and experience...For the younger players aspiring to play first-class cricket this is an opportunity to learn from their more experienced team mates and really test themselves and understand the attributes needed to succeed at this level." The squad was captained by experienced professional Keith Parsons, the former Somerset all-rounder, who was playing Minor Counties cricket for Cornwall.

== 2010 Clydesdale Bank 40 ==
Unicorns played in Group A of the 2010 Clydesdale Bank 40, along with Glamorgan, Lancashire, Somerset, Surrey, Sussex and Worcestershire; The competition was created for the 18 first-class counties, plus Scotland, Ireland and a Recreational XI based on players from the Minor Counties. Ireland declined to compete, thus leaving the competition one team short for the proposed three groups of seven format; and The Netherlands took their place. Unicorns were created to play representing the Minor Counties, thus giving a new opportunity for younger players to gain experience and to learn from experienced professionals. Unicorns had no fixed stadium and played their home games at six different outgrounds (stadiums with occasional use by first-class counties).

Their first competitive game was due to be against Surrey on 2 May 2010, but was abandoned without any play, due to rain. Both teams received one point. After a promising start in reply to Sussex's 255/8 at Hove, Unicorns collapsed from 207/4 to 211 all out, to lose their first full competitive game by 44 runs. Former England international bowler James Kirtley led the collapse, with four wickets in eight balls. Unicorns then lost by seven wickets to Somerset at Taunton.

In their fourth group game, on 16 May, Unicorns recorded their first win. Batting first against Glamorgan at Dean Park, Bournemouth, Unicorns scored 231/8, including a stand of 126 between Parsons and Knappett. Glamorgan were then restricted to 173. Unicorns then went on to hit the record books when they stunned Sussex, in complete contrast to their batting collapse against them earlier in the competition. Wes Durston smashed 117 from 68 balls as they chased down a target of 325 to set the highest score (327/4) for a team batting second in the history of 40-over cricket. The third-wicket partnership between Durston and Josh Knappett, both making their highest List A scores, made 165 in just 18 overs.

On resumption of the competition following the two-month break for Twenty20 matches, Unicorns suffered a nine-wicket defeat to Lancashire, before chasing another large total (277 runs), this time set by Worcestershire to win with two balls to spare; Michael O'Shea hit 90 from 62 balls.

== Demise ==
The Unicorns team was scrapped after the 2018 season. The Minor Counties Cricket Association had reintroduced a T20 competition in 2018 and decided that the money spent on the Unicorns team would be better used to fund that T20 competition. There were also concerns about selection and whether the team was properly representative of leisure cricket.

== See also ==
- Cricket Australia XI, a similar team for Australian players
- West Indies B, a similar team for West Indian players
