= 2019 Minor Counties Championship =

- Administrator(s): England and Wales Cricket Board
- Cricket format: 3 days (4 day final)
- Tournament format(s): League system and a final
- Champions: Berkshire (8th title)
- Participants: 20
- Matches: 61

The 2019 Minor Counties Championship was the 115th Minor Counties Cricket Championship season, and the fifth under the name 'Unicorn Counties Championship'. It is contested in two divisions. Berkshire were the defending champions and retained their title by defeating Staffordshire. The final was played in Bodicote, Oxfordshire, with Berkshire winning by 1 wicket.

== Standings ==
=== Format ===
Teams receive 16 points for a win, 8 for a tie and 4 for a draw. In a match reduced to a single innings, teams receive 12 points for a win, 8 for a draw (6 if less than 20 overs per side) and 4 points for losing. For matches abandoned without play, both sides receive 8 points. Bonus points (a maximum of 4 batting points and 4 bowling points) may be scored during the first 90 overs of each team's first innings.

=== Eastern Division ===
Team	Pld	W	W1	L	L1	T	D	D1D	D1<	Bat	Bowl	Ded	Pts
Staffordshire	6	4	0	0	0	0	2	0	0	18	21	0	112
Norfolk	6	4	0	1	0	0	1	0	0	15	24	0	107
Cambridgeshire	6	3	0	0	0	0	3	0	0	17	21	0	98
Lincolnshire	6	3	0	2	0	0	1	0	0	14	21	0	87
Suffolk	6	2	0	1	0	0	2	1	0	16	18	0	82
Cumberland	6	1	0	2	0	0	2	1	0	13	20	0	65
Buckinghamshire	6	1	0	3	0	0	2	0	0	11	23	0	58
Bedfordshire	6	1	0	3	0	0	2	0	0	10	17	0	51
Hertfordshire	6	0	0	3	0	0	3	0	0	17	19	0	48
Northumberland	6	0	0	4	0	0	2	0	0	13	20	0	41

=== Western Division ===
Team	Pld	W	W1	L	L1	T	D	D1D	D1<	Bat	Bowl	Ded	Pts
Berkshire	6	5	0	0	0	0	1	0	0	18	24	0	126
Cheshire	6	3	0	2	0	0	1	0	0	15	24	0	91
Wiltshire	6	3	0	2	0	0	1	0	0	9	23	2	82
Oxfordshire	6	3	0	3	0	0	0	0	0	12	21	0	81
Dorset	6	2	0	1	0	0	3	0	0	14	21	0	79
Cornwall	6	2	0	2	0	0	2	0	0	11	23	0	74
Devon	6	2	0	4	0	0	0	0	0	16	23	2	69
Wales Minor Counties	6	2	0	3	0	0	1	0	0	11	20	2	65
Herefordshire	6	2	0	4	0	0	0	0	0	4	23	0	59
Shropshire	6	1	0	4	0	0	1	0	0	8	20	0	48

== Final ==
The final featured the teams which finished with the most points in each Division, Berkshire and Staffordshire. It began on 15 September 2019 at Banbury with the result being a victory for Berkshire by 1 wicket. Berkshire retained the title whilst Staffordshire's most recent victory was in 2014.

15–17 September 2019
Scorecard

Staffordshire	v	Berkshire
150 (48.4 overs); Michael Hill 29 (54); Chris Peploe 2/18 (13 overs)		164 (45.2 overs); Richard Morris 89 (110); Robert Hemmings 4/21 (9.2 overs)
110 (38.5 overs); Robert Hemmings 21* (45); Tom Nugent 5/40 (18 overs)		97/9 (40.2 overs); Jack Davies 42* (103); Tim Maxfield 7/48 (20.2 overs)

Berkshire won by 1 Wicket
Banbury Cricket Club Ground, Bodicote, Oxfordshire
Umpires: Ian Herbert & Jack Shantry

- Berkshire won the toss and elected to field first
