= 2018 Minor Counties Championship =

- Administrator(s): England and Wales Cricket Board
- Cricket format: 3 days (4 day final)
- Tournament format(s): League system and a final
- Champions: Berkshire (7th title)
- Participants: 20
- Matches: 61

The 2018 Minor Counties Championship was the 114th Minor Counties Cricket Championship season, and the fourth under the name 'Unicorn Counties Championship'. It is contested in two divisions. Berkshire were the defending champions and retained their title by defeating Lincolnshire in a repeat of the 2016 and 2017 finals. The final was played in Bodicote, Oxfordshire, with Berkshire winning by an innings and 32 runs.

== Standings ==
=== Format ===
Teams receive 16 points for a win, 8 for a tie and 4 for a draw. In a match reduced to a single innings, teams receive 12 points for a win, 8 for a draw (6 if less than 20 overs per side) and 4 points for losing. For matches abandoned without play, both sides receive 8 points. Bonus points (a maximum of 4 batting points and 4 bowling points) may be scored during the first 90 overs of each team's first innings.

=== Eastern Division ===
Team	Pld	W	W1	L	L1	T	D	D1D	D1<	A	Bat	Bowl	Ded	Pts
Lincolnshire	6	4	0	1	0	0	1	0	0	0	21	18	0	107
Suffolk	6	4	0	1	0	0	1	0	0	0	16	21	0	105
Staffordshire	6	4	0	1	0	0	1	0	0	0	18	17	0	103
Buckinghamshire	6	4	0	2	0	0	0	0	0	0	14	21	0	99
Norfolk	6	3	0	2	0	0	1	0	0	0	14	20	0	86
Cambridgeshire	6	3	0	3	0	0	0	0	0	0	14	23	0	85
Cumberland	6	2	0	3	0	0	1	0	0	0	16	19	16	55
Hertfordshire	6	1	0	4	0	0	1	0	0	0	12	19	0	51
Bedfordshire	6	0	0	4	0	0	2	0	0	0	10	21	0	39
Northumberland	6	0	0	4	0	0	2	0	0	0	9	20	0	37

=== Western Division ===
Team	Pld	W	W1	L	L1	T	D	D1D	D1<	A	Bat	Bowl	Ded	Pts
Berkshire	6	6	0	0	0	0	0	0	0	0	19	23	0	138
Oxfordshire	6	5	0	1	0	0	0	0	0	0	12	23	0	115
Shropshire	6	4	0	1	0	0	1	0	0	0	21	24	2	111
Cornwall	6	2	0	2	0	0	2	0	0	0	9	24	0	73
Cheshire	6	1	0	3	0	0	2	0	0	0	20	24	0	68
Wiltshire	6	2	0	3	0	0	1	0	0	0	9	24	2	67
Herefordshire	6	2	0	4	0	0	0	0	0	0	11	23	0	66
Devon	6	1	0	3	0	0	2	0	0	0	14	23	0	61
Dorset	6	1	0	4	0	0	1	0	0	0	4	21	0	45
Wales Minor Counties	6	0	0	3	0	0	3	0	0	0	8	23	4	39

== Final ==
The final featured the teams which finished with the most points in each Division, Berkshire and Lincolnshire – A repeat of the 2016 and 2017 finals. It began on 16 September 2018 at Banbury with the result being a victory for Berkshire by an innings and 32 Runs. Berkshire retained the title whilst Lincolnshire's most recent victory was in 2003.

16–19 September 2018
Scorecard

Lincolnshire	v	Berkshire
198 (60.5 overs); Nick Keast 42 (68); Alexander Russell 5/57 (17 overs)		405/7d (90 overs); Euan Woods 99 (161); Curtis Free 4/91 (20 overs)
175 (62.4 overs); Jack Timby 42 (78); Andrew Rishton 5/33 (16 overs)

Berkshire won by an innings and 32 runs
Banbury Cricket Club Ground, Bodicote, Oxfordshire
Umpires: Naeem Ashraf & Anthony Harris

- Berkshire won the toss and elected to field first
