= 2015 Minor Counties Championship =

2015 Cricket competition

- Administrator(s): England and Wales Cricket Board
- Cricket format: (3 days, 4 day final)
- Tournament format(s): League system
- Champions: Cumberland (3rd title)
- Participants: 20
- Matches: 61
- Most runs: Jacques du Toit (770 for Northumberland)
- Most wickets: Chris Peploe (50 for Berkshire)

The 2015 Minor Counties Championship was the 111th Minor Counties Cricket Championship season, and the second under the name 'Unicorn Counties Championship'. It was contested in two divisions: Eastern and Western. Cumberland won the competition for the third time after defeating Oxfordshire by 10 wickets in the final played in Carlisle.

== Standings ==
- Pld = Played, W = Wins, W1 = Win in match reduced to single innings, L = Losses, L1 = Loss in match reduced to single innings, T = Ties, D = Draws, D1 = Draw in match reduced to single innings, A = Abandonments, Bat = Batting points, Bowl = Bowling points, Ded = Deducted points, Pts = Points, Net RPW = Net runs per wicket (runs per wicket for less runs per wicket against).

Teams receive 16 points for a win, 8 for a tie and 4 for a draw. Teams also received 12 points for a win, 6 for a draw and 4 points for losing a match reduced to a single innings. Bonus points (a maximum of 4 batting points and 4 bowling points) may be scored during the first 90 overs of each team's first innings.

=== Eastern Division ===
Team	Pld	W	W1	L	L1	T	D	D1	A	Bat	Bowl	Ded	Pts	Net RPW
Cumberland (C)	6	5	0	0	0	0	1	0	0	17	24	0	125	+15.541
Buckinghamshire	6	4	0	2	0	0	0	0	0	12	18	0	94	-4.565
Staffordshire	6	3	0	2	0	0	1	0	0	18	20	0	90	+7.834
Lincolnshire	6	3	0	1	0	0	2	0	0	10	21	0	87	-0.688
Northumberland	6	3	0	3	0	0	0	0	0	14	24	0	86	0.663
Hertfordshire	6	2	0	3	0	0	1	0	0	18	20	0	74	-4.785
Bedfordshire	6	1	0	3	0	0	2	0	0	19	21	0	64	-0.876
Cambridgeshire	6	2	0	4	0	0	0	0	0	10	23	-2	63	-2.684
Norfolk	6	1	0	2	0	0	3	0	0	12	23	0	63	0.531
Suffolk	6	1	0	5	0	0	0	0	0	16	22	0	54	-10.151

=== Western Division ===
Team	Pld	W	W1	L	L1	T	D	D1	A	Bat	Bowl	Ded	Pts	Net RPW
Oxfordshire	6	5	0	1	0	0	0	0	0	18	24	0	122	+15.268
Berkshire	6	4	0	0	0	0	2	0	0	13	24	0	109	+6.534
Shropshire	6	2	0	1	0	0	3	0	0	22	24	0	90	+8.705
Cornwall	6	3	0	2	0	0	1	0	0	15	22	0	89	+1.419
Herefordshire	6	2	0	3	0	0	1	0	0	17	22	0	75	-1.053
Wales Minor Counties	6	2	0	2	0	0	2	0	0	13	21	0	74	-1.382
Wiltshire	6	2	0	2	0	0	2	0	0	9	24	0	73	-3.123
Dorset	6	1	0	3	0	0	1	0	1	8	19	-2	53	-8.017
Cheshire	6	1	0	4	0	0	0	0	1	6	20	0	50	-12.515
Devon	6	0	0	4	0	0	2	0	0	16	24	0	48	-9.043

== Final ==
6–7 September
Scorecard

Oxfordshire	v	(H) Cumberland
85 (40.4 overs); RI Kaufman 17 (56); T Bulcock 4/18 (10 overs)		170 (48.2 overs); JR Tolley 45 (88); LC Ryan 5/37 (16 overs)
89 (42 overs); CB Keegan 29 (16); RJ Gleeson 3/14 (13 overs)		5/0 (0.2 overs); JR Tolley 4* (1)

Cumberland won by 10 wickets
Edenside, Carlisle
Umpires: Martyn Dobbs and Andy Hicks

- Cumberland won the toss and elected to field

== Averages ==
Most runs
Aggregate	Average	Player	County
770	64.16	Jacques du Toit	Northumberland
763	69.36	Luke Thomas	Bedfordshire
730	73.00	George Thurstance	Bedfordshire
702	70.20	Steve Leach	Shropshire
612	61.20	Sam Arthurton	Norfolk

Most wickets
Aggregate	Average	Player	County
50	16.08	Chris Peploe	Berkshire
49	14.85	Toby Bulcock	Cumberland
46	14.38	Paul McMahon	Cambridgeshire
46	20.60	Bradley Wadlan	Cornwall
35	14.62	Luke Ryan	Oxfordshire
35	19.65	Gurman Randhawa	Shropshire
