= 2021 National Counties Championship =

- Administrator: England and Wales Cricket Board
- Cricket format: 3 days (4 day final)
- Tournament format(s): League system and a final
- Champions: Oxfordshire (5th title)
- Participants: 20
- Matches: 41
- Most runs: Graham Wagg (Shropshire); 583 runs
- Most wickets: Tom Brett (Bedfordshire); 36 wickets

The 2021 National Counties Championship was the 116th National Counties Cricket Championship season. It is contested in two divisions. Berkshire were the defending champions. The title was won by Oxfordshire by defeating Suffolk in the final by 178 runs. The final was played in Tring, Hertfordshire.

== Standings ==
=== Format ===
Teams receive 16 points for a win, 8 for a tie and 4 for a draw. In a match reduced to a single innings, teams receive 12 points for a win, 8 for a draw (6 if less than 20 overs per side) and 4 points for losing. For matches abandoned without play, both sides receive 8 points. Bonus points (a maximum of 4 batting points and 4 bowling points) may be scored during the first 90 overs of each team's first innings.

=== Eastern Division ===
Division 1

Team	Pld	W	W1	L	L1	T	D	D1D	D1<	A	Bat	Bowl	Ded	Pts
Suffolk	4	3	0	0	0	0	0	0	0	1	7	12	0	75
Norfolk	4	3	0	0	0	0	0	0	0	1	5	12	0	73
Staffordshire	4	1	0	2	0	0	1	0	0	0	12	16	0	48
Lincolnshire	4	0	0	2	0	0	2	0	0	0	6	13	0	27
Cambridgeshire	4	0	0	3	0	0	1	0	0	0	4	23	0	21

- Suffolk were Eastern Division Champions.
- Suffolk qualified for the NCCA Championship Final.
- Cambridgeshire were relegated to Division Two.

Division 2

Team	Pld	W	W1	L	L1	T	D	D1D	D1<	A	Bat	Bowl	Ded	Pts
Bedfordshire	4	2	0	0	0	0	2	0	0	0	9	16	0	65
Buckinghamshire	4	2	0	1	0	0	1	0	0	0	5	16	0	57
Hertfordshire	4	1	0	1	0	0	1	0	0	1	7	8	0	43
Cumbria	4	1	0	2	0	0	0	0	0	1	3	12	0	39
Northumberland	4	1	0	3	0	0	0	0	0	0	2	16	0	34

- Bedfordshire were Eastern Division Two Champions.
- Bedfordshire were promoted to Division One.

=== Western Division ===
Division 1

Team	Pld	W	W1	L	L1	T	D	D1D	D1<	Bat	Bowl	Ded	Pts
Oxfordshire	4	3	0	1	0	0	0	0	0	10	15	0	73
Berkshire	4	2	0	1	0	0	1	0	0	8	15	0	59
Cheshire	4	1	0	1	0	0	2	0	0	8	15	0	47
Dorset	4	1	0	2	0	0	1	0	0	4	15	0	39
Wiltshire	4	0	0	2	0	0	2	0	0	2	14	0	24

- Oxfordshire were Western Division Champions.
- Oxfordshire qualified for the NCCA Championship Final.
- Wiltshire were relegated to Division Two.

Division 2

Team	Pld	W	W1	L	L1	T	D	D1D	D1<	Bat	Bowl	Ded	Pts
Herefordshire	4	3	0	0	0	0	1	0	0	9	16	0	77
Shropshire	4	2	0	1	0	0	1	0	0	6	15	2	55
Cornwall	4	1	0	1	0	0	2	0	0	4	16	0	44
Wales National County	4	0	0	1	0	0	3	0	0	8	16	0	36
Devon	4	0	0	3	0	0	1	0	0	5	16	0	25

- Herefordshire were Western Division Two Champions.
- Herefordshire were promoted to Division One.

== Final ==
The final featured the teams which finished with the most points in each Division One, Suffolk and Oxfordshire. It began on 5 September 2021 at Tring Park with the result being a victory for Oxfordshire by 178 runs. Oxfordshire won their fifth title, the previous being in 1989, whilst Suffolk's most recent victory was its shared title in 2005.

5–8 September 2021
Scorecard

Oxfordshire	v	Suffolk
248 (81.1 overs); Jonathan Cater 56 (110); Jack Beaumont 3/39 (14.1 overs)		213 (87.4 overs); Josh Cantrell 49 (114); Gareth Andrew 3/56 (26 overs)
311 (115.1 overs); Oliver Ebsworth-Burland 38 (100); Jack Beaumont 5/59 (27.1 overs)		168 (86.4 overs); Jacob Marston 61 (218); Oliver Clarke 5/59 (24.4 overs)

Oxfordshire won by 178 runs
Tring Park Cricket Club Ground, Tring, Hertfordshire
Umpires: Ian Herbert & Jack Shantry

- Suffolk won the toss and elected to field first.
