= 2024 National Counties Championship =

- Administrator(s): England and Wales Cricket Board
- Cricket format: 3 days (4 day final)
- Tournament format(s): League system and a final
- Champions: Staffordshire; Berkshire (shared)
- Participants: 20
- Matches: 41
- Most runs: Ben Wright (Lincolnshire); 515 runs
- Most wickets: Tom Brett (Bedfordshire); 31 wickets

The 2024 National Counties Championship was the 119th National Counties Cricket Championship season. It was contested in two divisions. Buckinghamshire were the defending champions, but they finished third in the Eastern Division 1 in 2024. Staffordshire and Berkshire shared the title after the final ended in a draw. The final was played in West Bromwich. This was the second shared title for Staffordshire (and 14th overall), while Berkshire shared the title for the first time, while winning it nine more times.

== Standings ==
=== Format ===
Teams receive 16 points for a win, 8 for a tie and 4 for a draw. In a match reduced to single innings, teams receive 12 points for a win, 8 for a draw (6 if less than 20 overs per side) and 4 points for losing. For matches abandoned without play, both sides receive 8 points. Bonus points (a maximum of 4 batting points and 4 bowling points) may be scored during the first 90 overs of each team's first innings.

=== Eastern Division ===
Division 1

Team	Pld	W	W1	L	L1	T	D	D1D	D1<	A	Bat	Bowl	Ded	Pts
Staffordshire	4	2	0	0	0	0	2	0	0	0	12	15	0	67
Suffolk	4	1	0	1	0	0	2	0	0	0	13	14	0	51
Buckinghamshire	4	1	0	1	0	0	2	0	0	0	7	14	0	45
Lincolnshire	4	0	0	1	0	0	3	0	0	0	15	13	0	40
Bedfordshire	4	0	0	1	0	0	3	0	0	0	12	15	2	37

- Staffordshire were Eastern Division Champions.
- Staffordshire qualified for the NCCA Championship Final.
- Bedfordshire were relegated to Division Two.

Division 2

Team	Pld	W	W1	L	L1	T	D	D1D	D1<	A	Bat	Bowl	Ded	Pts
Cambridgeshire	4	3	0	0	0	0	1	0	0	0	7	16	0	75
Hertfordshire	4	2	0	0	0	0	2	0	0	0	13	16	0	69
Norfolk	4	1	0	2	0	0	1	0	0	0	8	13	0	41
Northumberland	4	1	0	2	0	0	1	0	0	0	4	13	2	35
Cumbria	4	0	0	3	0	0	1	0	0	0	9	16	0	29

- Cambridgeshire were Eastern Division Two Champions.
- Cambridgeshire were promoted to Division One.

=== Western Division ===
Division 1

Team	Pld	W	W1	L	L1	T	D	D1D	D1<	A	Bat	Bowl	Ded	Pts
Berkshire	4	3	0	0	0	0	1	0	0	0	13	15	0	80
Oxfordshire	4	1	0	1	0	0	2	0	0	0	13	10	0	47
Cornwall	4	1	0	1	0	0	2	0	0	0	4	15	0	43
Devon	4	1	0	2	0	0	1	0	0	0	9	14	0	43
Cheshire	4	0	0	2	0	0	2	0	0	0	10	15	0	33

- Berkshire were Western Division Champions.
- Berkshire qualified for the NCCA Championship Final.
- Cheshire were relegated to Division Two.

Division 2

Team	Pld	W	W1	L	L1	T	D	D1D	D1<	Bat	Bowl	Ded	Pts
Herefordshire	4	2	0	0	0	0	2	0	0	14	16	0	70
Shropshire	4	2	0	1	0	0	1	0	0	10	12	0	58
Wiltshire	4	1	0	1	0	0	2	0	0	12	14	0	50
Wales National County	4	1	0	2	0	0	1	0	0	7	16	0	43
Dorset	4	0	0	2	0	0	2	0	0	8	12	0	28

- Herefordshire were Western Division Two Champions.
- Herefordshire were promoted to Division One.

== Final ==
The final featured the teams which finished with the most points in each Division One, Staffordshire and Berkshire. It began on 1 September 2024 at West Bromwich Dartmouth Cricket Club Ground with the result being a draw after four days of play.

1–4 September 2024
Scorecard

Berkshire	v	Staffordshire
382 (89.5 overs); Johnny Connell 142 (259); Reeve Evitts 5/48 (8 overs)		283 (86.3 overs); James Kettleborough 64 (127); Tommy Sturgess 5/82 (23.3 overs)
283/3d (58 overs); Rhys Lewis 105* (155); Tom Brett 1/38 (11 overs)		142/2d (50 overs); Matthew Morris 63* (144); Rhys Lewis 1/28 (11 overs)

Match drawn
West Bromwich Dartmouth Cricket Club Ground, West Bromwich
Umpires: Steve Beswick and Robin Parker

- Staffordshire won the toss and decided to field.
