= 2022 National Counties Championship =

- Administrator(s): England and Wales Cricket Board
- Cricket format: 3 days (4 day final)
- Tournament format(s): League system and a final
- Champions: Berkshire (9th title)
- Participants: 20
- Matches: 41
- Most runs: Robert Sehmi (Cheshire); 464 runs
- Most wickets: Matthew Siddall (Cumbria); 40 wickets

The 2022 National Counties Championship is the 117th National Counties Cricket Championship season. It is contested in two divisions. Oxfordshire were the defending champions, but they finished second in the Western Division 1 this season. Berkshire won the title by defeating Lincolnshire in the final by virtue of their first innings lead in a drawn match. The final was played in West Bromwich, Staffordshire. This was the 9th title for Berkshire and their 5th in the last 7 years.

== Standings ==
=== Format ===
Teams receive 16 points for a win, 8 for a tie and 4 for a draw. In a match reduced to single innings, teams receive 12 points for a win, 8 for a draw (6 if less than 20 overs per side) and 4 points for losing. For matches abandoned without play, both sides receive 8 points. Bonus points (a maximum of 4 batting points and 4 bowling points) may be scored during the first 90 overs of each team's first innings.

=== Eastern Division ===
Division 1

Team	Pld	W	W1	L	L1	T	D	D1D	D1<	A	Bat	Bowl	Ded	Pts
Lincolnshire	4	2	0	0	0	0	2	0	0	0	9	14	0	63
Suffolk	4	2	0	2	0	0	0	0	0	0	9	12	0	53
Staffordshire	4	1	0	1	0	0	1	0	0	1	12	10	0	50
Norfolk	4	1	0	1	0	0	1	0	0	1	8	11	0	47
Bedfordshire	4	1	0	3	0	0	0	0	0	0	12	11	0	39

- Lincolnshire were Eastern Division Champions.
- Lincolnshire qualified for the NCCA Championship Final.
- Bedfordshire were relegated to Division Two.

Division 2

Team	Pld	W	W1	L	L1	T	D	D1D	D1<	A	Bat	Bowl	Ded	Pts
Buckinghamshire	4	4	0	0	0	0	0	0	0	0	14	16	0	94
Cambridgeshire	4	2	0	2	0	0	0	0	0	0	5	15	0	52
Hertfordshire	4	1	0	1	0	0	2	0	0	0	12	15	0	51
Cumbria	4	1	0	2	0	0	1	0	0	0	6	16	0	42
Northumberland	4	0	0	3	0	0	1	0	0	0	4	15	2	21

- Buckinghamshire were Eastern Division Two Champions.
- Buckinghamshire were promoted to Division One.

=== Western Division ===
Division 1

Team	Pld	W	W1	L	L1	T	D	D1D	D1<	Bat	Bowl	Ded	Pts
Berkshire	4	3	0	1	0	0	0	0	0	14	15	2	75
Oxfordshire	4	3	0	1	0	0	0	0	0	8	16	0	72
Cheshire	4	1	0	2	0	0	1	0	0	12	16	0	48
Herefordshire	4	1	0	2	0	0	1	0	0	6	15	2	39
Dorset	4	0	0	2	0	0	2	0	0	8	15	0	31

- Berkshire were Western Division Champions.
- Berkshire qualified for the NCCA Championship Final.
- Dorset were relegated to Division Two.

Division 2

Team	Pld	W	W1	L	L1	T	D	D1D	D1<	Bat	Bowl	Ded	Pts
Devon	4	3	0	1	0	0	0	0	0	13	16	0	77
Wales National County	4	2	0	1	0	0	1	0	0	8	14	0	58
Wiltshire	4	1	0	2	0	0	1	0	0	11	16	2	45
Cornwall	4	1	0	1	0	0	2	0	0	6	15	2	43
Shropshire	4	1	0	3	0	0	0	0	0	7	14	2	35

- Devon were Western Division Two Champions.
- Devon were promoted to Division One.

== Final ==
The final featured the teams which finished with the most points in each Division One, Lincolnshire and Berkshire. It began on 4 September 2022 at Sandwell Park with the result being a victory for Berkshire by first innings lead in a drawn match. Berkshire won their ninth title, with the five being won in the last seven years, whilst Lincolnshire's most recent victory was in 2003.

4–7 September 2022
Scorecard

Lincolnshire	v	Berkshire
176 (41.2 overs); Nic Keast 38 (31); Tom Nugent 6/66 (15 overs)		310 (81 overs); Euan Woods 129 (181); James Dobson 2/34 (11 overs)
65/1 (15 overs); Jack Timby 33* (41); Tom Nugent 1/36 (6 overs)

Drawn. Berkshire won the title by first innings lead
West Bromwich Dartmouth Cricket Club Ground, West Bromwich, Staffordshire
Umpires: Ian Herbert & Paul Sparshott

- Berkshire won the toss and elected to field first.
