= 2026 National Counties Championship =

- Administrator: England and Wales Cricket Board
- Cricket format: 3 days (4 day final)
- Tournament format(s): League system and a final
- Champions: Devon (8th title)
- Participants: 20
- Matches: 41

The 2025 National Counties Championship was the 121st National Counties Cricket Championship season. It was contested in two divisions. Buckinghamshire were the defending champions, reaching the final this year as well. The final was played in West Bromwich. Devon won the title by defeating Buckinghamshire by 122 runs. This was the 8th title for Devon, the last one of which has been won in 2011.

== Standings ==
=== Format ===
Teams receive 16 points for a win, 8 for a tie and 4 for a draw. In a match reduced to single innings, teams receive 12 points for a win, 8 for a draw (6 if less than 20 overs per side) and 4 points for losing. For matches abandoned without play, both sides receive 8 points. Bonus points (a maximum of 4 batting points and 4 bowling points) may be scored during the first 90 overs of each team's first innings.

=== Eastern Division ===
Division 1

Team	Pld	W	W1	L	L1	T	D	D1D	D1<	A	Bat	Bowl	Pts
Buckinghamshire	4	3	0	1	0	0	0	0	0	0	7	16	71
Suffolk	4	2	0	1	0	0	1	0	0	0	10	16	62
Staffordshire	4	1	0	1	0	0	2	0	0	0	9	16	49
Northumberland	4	1	0	1	0	0	2	0	0	0	9	16	49
Cambridgeshire	4	0	0	3	0	0	1	0	0	0	9	13	26

- Buckinghamshire were Eastern Division Champions.
- Buckinghamshire qualified for the NCCA Championship Final.
- Cambridgeshire were relegated to Division Two.

Division 2

Team	Pld	W	W1	L	L1	T	D	D1D	D1<	A	Bat	Bowl	Pts
Lincolnshire	4	2	0	0	0	0	2	0	0	0	14	16	70
Norfolk	4	2	0	1	0	0	1	0	0	0	15	15	66
Cumbria	4	2	0	1	0	0	1	0	0	0	4	11	51
Hertfordshire	4	1	0	2	0	0	1	0	0	0	9	15	44
Bedfordshire	4	0	0	3	0	0	1	0	0	0	4	10	18

- Lincolnshire were Eastern Division Two Champions.
- Lincolnshire were promoted to Division One.

=== Western Division ===
Division 1

Team	Pld	W	W1	L	L1	T	D	D1D	D1<	A	Bat	Bowl	Pts
Devon	4	3	0	0	0	0	1	0	0	0	14	15	81
Berkshire	4	2	0	1	0	0	1	0	0	0	14	16	66
Oxfordshire	4	2	0	2	0	0	0	0	0	0	8	16	56
Wiltshire	4	2	0	2	0	0	0	0	0	0	8	16	56
Herefordshire	4	0	0	4	0	0	0	0	0	0	5	16	21

- Devon were Western Division Champions.
- Devon qualified for the NCCA Championship Final.
- Herefordshire were relegated to Division Two.

Division 2

Team	Pld	W	W1	L	L1	T	D	D1D	D1<	Bat	Bowl	Pts
Cornwall	4	3	0	0	0	0	1	0	0	15	16	83
Shropshire	4	2	0	1	0	0	1	0	0	10	16	62
Dorset	4	1	0	1	0	0	2	0	0	10	16	50
Wales National County	4	1	0	3	0	0	0	0	0	4	13	33
Cheshire	4	0	0	2	0	0	2	0	0	10	12	30

- Cornwall were Western Division Two Champions.
- Cornwall were promoted to Division One.

== Final ==
The final featured the teams which finished with the most points in each Division One, Buckinghamshire and Devon. It began on 6 September 2026 at West Bromwich Dartmouth Cricket Club Ground with the result being a victory for Devon by 122 runs. Devon won their eight title, with previous one being one in 2011. This was the third final in four years between these two teams.

6–9 September 2026
Scorecard

Devon	v	Buckinghamshire
290 (81.4 overs); Sam Elstone 104 (158); Conner Haddow 5/103 (34.4 overs)		279 (89.2 overs); Rhys Nicholas 48 (113); Ben Privett 3/32 (8 overs)
244 (100.1 overs); Elliot Hamilton 70 (134); Conner Haddow 6/96 (44.1 overs)		133 (58 overs); Josh Lincoln 33 (48); Callum Harvey 3/58 (29 overs)

Devon won by 122 runs
West Bromwich Dartmouth Cricket Club Ground, West Bromwich
Umpires: Patrick Brown and Brett Gates

- Devon won the toss and decided to bat.
