= 2016 Minor Counties Championship =

Sports season

- Administrator: England and Wales Cricket Board
- Cricket format: 3 days (4 day final)
- Tournament format(s): League system and a final
- Champions: Berkshire (5th title)
- Participants: 20
- Matches: 61

The 2016 Minor Counties Championship was the 112th Minor Counties Cricket Championship season, and the third under the name 'Unicorn Counties Championship'. It was contested in two divisions. Berkshire defeated Lincolnshire by 28 runs in the final, which was played at the Getty Estate, Buckinghamshire.

== Standings ==
=== Format ===
Teams receive 16 points for a win, 8 for a tie and 4 for a draw. In a match reduced to a single innings, teams receive 12 points for a win, 8 for a draw and 4 points for losing. For matches abandoned without play, both sides receive 8 points. Bonus points (a maximum of 4 batting points and 4 bowling points) may be scored during the first 90 overs of each team's first innings.

=== Eastern Division ===
Team	Pld	W	W1	L	L1	T	D	D1	A	Bat	Bowl	Ded	Pts
Lincolnshire	6	5	0	0	0	0	1	0	0	23	21	2	126
Northumberland	6	5	0	0	0	0	1	0	0	19	23	0	126
Staffordshire	6	2	0	1	0	0	3	0	0	21	22	2	85
Cambridgeshire	6	2	0	1	0	0	3	0	0	9	20	0	73
Norfolk	6	2	0	3	0	0	1	0	0	13	24	0	73
Cumberland	6	1	0	3	0	0	2	0	0	15	23	0	62
Hertfordshire	6	1	0	2	0	0	3	0	0	16	17	0	61
Suffolk	6	1	0	3	0	0	2	0	0	5	24	2	51
Bedfordshire	6	0	0	3	0	0	3	0	0	15	17	0	44
Buckinghamshire	6	0	0	3	0	0	3	0	0	12	16	0	40

=== Western Division ===
Team	Pld	W	W1	L	L1	T	D	D1	A	Bat	Bowl	Ded	Pts
Berkshire (C)	6	4	0	0	0	0	2	0	0	18	22	0	112
Cornwall	6	3	0	2	0	0	1	0	0	16	22	0	90
Herefordshire	6	2	0	2	0	1	1	0	0	13	23	0	80
Shropshire	6	4	0	2	0	0	0	0	0	12	21	24	73
Devon	6	2	0	3	0	1	0	0	0	8	24	0	72
Wiltshire	6	2	0	3	0	0	1	0	0	13	22	0	71
Cheshire	6	2	0	4	0	0	0	0	0	11	24	2	65
Dorset	6	2	0	3	0	0	1	0	0	6	23	2	63
Oxfordshire	6	2	0	3	0	0	1	0	0	12	18	4	62
Wales Minor Counties	6	1	0	2	0	0	3	0	0	10	23	0	61

== Final ==
The final featured the teams which finished with the most points in each Division, Berkshire and Lincolnshire. It began on 28 August 2016 at the Getty Estate with the result being a victory for Berkshire by 28 runs. Berkshire had last won the title in 2008 whilst Lincolnshire's most recent victory was in 2003.

28 August 2016
Scorecard

Berkshire	v	Lincolnshire
332 (89.3 overs); E Woods 142* (176); DS Lucas 4/47 (17 overs)		284 (90 overs); JA Tattersall 71 (162); CT Peploe 5/101 (31 overs)
237 (76.1 overs); SR Davison 51 (81); AJ Willerton 4/45 (15.1 overs)		257 (123.4 overs); M Carter 59 (174); CT Peploe 5/74 (46.4 overs)

Berkshire won by 28 runs
Getty Estate
Umpires: Geoff Callaway and Ian Herbert

- Berkshire won the toss and elected to bat
