= 2023 English cricket season =

Cricket in England

County Championship
- Champions: Surrey
- Runners-up: Essex
- Most runs: Alex Lees (1,347)
- Most wickets: Brett Hutton (62)

One-Day Cup
- Champions: Leicestershire
- Runners-up: Hampshire
- Most runs: Ed Barnard (616)
- Most wickets: Oliver Hannon-Dalby (24)

T20 Blast
- Champions: Somerset
- Runners-up: Essex Eagles
- Most runs: James Vince (670)
- Most wickets: Matt Henry (31)

Rachael Heyhoe Flint Trophy
- Champions: Southern Vipers
- Runners-up: The Blaze
- Most runs: Lauren Winfield-Hill (663)
- Most wickets: Georgia Davis (27)

Charlotte Edwards Cup
- Champions: Southern Vipers
- Runners-up: The Blaze
- Most runs: Danni Wyatt (273)
- Most wickets: Nadine de Klerk (15)

The Hundred
- Champions: Southern Brave (women's); Oval Invincibles (men's)
- Runners-up: Northern Superchargers (women's); Manchester Originals (men's)
- Most runs: Danni Wyatt (295) (women's); Jos Buttler (391) (men's)
- Most wickets: Georgia Adams (16) (women's); Tymal Mills (16) (men's)

Wisden Cricketers of the Year
- Tom Blundell, Ben Foakes, Harmanpreet Kaur, Daryl Mitchell, Matthew Potts

The 2023 English cricket season began on 6 April 2023 and finished on 29 September 2023.

It was the 123rd season in which the County Championship has been an official competition and featured First-Class, List-A and Twenty20 cricket competitions throughout England and Wales.

The 18 first-class counties competed in the 2023 County Championship, One-Day Cup, and T20 Blast competitions, whilst women's teams competed for the Rachael Heyhoe Flint Trophy and the Charlotte Edwards Cup.

The season also saw the third edition of The Hundred, for both men and women.

== International tours ==
Three international men's sides toured England in 2023: Ireland, Australia and New Zealand. Two international women's sides toured in England in 2023: Australia and Sri Lanka.

=== Ireland men's tour ===
In June 2023, the Ireland men's cricket team toured England to play one Test match. England won the one-off Test match. In September 2023, the Ireland team returned to play three ODIs. England won the 3-match series 1–0 with two matches abandoned.

=== Australia men's tour ===
In June and July 2023, the Australia men's cricket team toured England to play 5 Tests. Australia retained the Ashes after drawing the fourth Test to take an unassailable 2–1 lead in the series, but England's victory in the final Test meant the series was drawn 2–2, the second successive drawn Ashes series in England, the previous being the 2019 series.

=== New Zealand men's tour ===
In August and September 2023, the New Zealand men's cricket team toured England to play four ODIs and four T20Is. England won the ODI series 3–1, whilst the T20 series was drawn 2–2.

=== Australia women's tour ===
The Australia women's cricket team toured England in June and July 2023 to play the England women's cricket team to contest the Women's Ashes. The tour consisted of one five-day Test match, three WODIs, and three WT20Is.

Australia women won the Test match by 89 runs, taking 4 points, whereas England won the T20I series 2–1, and also won the WODI series 2–1. However, Australia retained the Ashes when they won the second WODI, and the series ended as a draw, with both teams earning eight points.

=== Sri Lanka women's tour ===
In August and September 2023, the Sri Lanka women's cricket team toured England, playing three WODIs and three WT20Is. England won both the WODI series 2–0 with one no result, whilst Sri Lanka won the WT20I series 2–1.

== Domestic cricket ==
=== County Championship ===
The men's County Championship began on 6 April and finished on 29 September with each team playing 14 fixtures. As in 2022, Division One had ten teams and Division Two had eight teams. Surrey were the defending champions, and retained their title in the last round of matches. Middlesex and Northamptonshire were relegated from Division One, with Durham and Worcestershire promoted to replace them.

=== One-Day Cup ===
The One-Day Cup ran from 1 August to 16 September with the counties separated into two groups of nine. Leicestershire defeated Hampshire in the final, winning by two runs.

=== T20 Blast ===
The T20 Blast ran from 20 May until 15 July with the eighteen counties divided into two groups of nine - the North Group and the South Group. South Group winners Somerset were crowned champions, beating Essex Eagles by 14 runs in the final.

=== The Hundred ===
The third season of The Hundred took place from 1 to 27 August, with eight men's and eight women's teams competing.

The women's competition was restored to full-length, having been shortened in 2022 as a result of the 2022 Commonwealth Games. Southern Brave won the women's competition, whilst Oval Invincibles won the men's competition.

=== Rachael Heyhoe Flint Trophy ===
The Rachael Heyhoe Flint Trophy took place from 22 April to 24 September, with eight regional teams competing in a round-robin group. The final took place on 24 September at the County Ground, Northampton. Southern Vipers won the title for the third time, beating The Blaze.

=== Charlotte Edwards Cup ===
The Charlotte Edwards Cup took place from 18 May to 11 June, with eight regional teams competing in a round-robin group. The Blaze, Southern Vipers, and North West Thunder progressed to the Finals Weekend at New Road, Worcester. Southern Vipers, who were the defending champions, won the tournament, beating The Blaze in the final.

=== Women's County Cricket ===
The Women's Twenty20 Cup took place in April and May 2023, with eight regional winners. Various regional county competitions also took place: the East of England Women's County Championship, the Women's London Championship, the Women's London Cup, the South Central Counties Cup and the West Midlands Regional Cup.

=== National Counties Cricket ===
Buckinghamshire won the National Counties Championship, beating Devon by 550 runs in the final. Berkshire won the NCCA Trophy for the fourth consecutive season, beating Cumbria by 29 runs in the final.
