= 2017 Minor Counties Championship =

- Administrator(s): England and Wales Cricket Board
- Cricket format: 3 days (4 day final)
- Tournament format(s): League system and a final
- Champions: Berkshire (6th title)
- Participants: 20
- Matches: 61

The 2017 Minor Counties Championship was the 113th Minor Counties Cricket Championship season, and the fourth under the name 'Unicorn Counties Championship'. It was contested in two divisions. Berkshire were the defending champions and retained their title by defeating Lincolnshire in a repeat of the 2016 final. The final was played in Bodicote, Oxfordshire, with Berkshire winning by 6 wickets.

== Standings ==
=== Format ===
Teams receive 16 points for a win, 8 for a tie and 4 for a draw. In a match reduced to a single innings, teams receive 12 points for a win, 8 for a draw (6 if less than 20 overs per side) and 4 points for losing. For matches abandoned without play, both sides receive 8 points. Bonus points (a maximum of 4 batting points and 4 bowling points) may be scored during the first 90 overs of each team's first innings.

=== Eastern Division ===
Team	Pld	W	W1	L	L1	T	D	D1D	D1<	A	Bat	Bowl	Ded	Pts
Lincolnshire	6	4	0	0	0	0	2	0	0	0	21	24	0	117
Suffolk	6	2	0	0	0	0	4	0	0	0	20	24	0	92
Staffordshire	6	2	0	0	0	0	4	0	0	0	21	16	0	85
Cumberland	6	2	0	0	0	0	4	0	0	0	13	22	0	83
Norfolk	6	2	0	1	0	0	3	0	0	0	15	23	2	80
Cambridgeshire	6	1	0	1	0	0	4	0	0	0	15	22	2	67
Hertfordshire	6	1	0	2	0	0	3	0	0	0	18	20	0	66
Buckinghamshire	6	0	0	2	0	0	4	0	0	0	9	20	0	45
Bedfordshire	6	0	0	4	0	0	2	0	0	0	11	22	8	33
Northumberland	6	0	0	4	0	0	2	0	0	0	2	19	0	29

=== Western Division ===
Team	Pld	W	W1	L	L1	T	D	D1D	D1<	A	Bat	Bowl	Ded	Pts
Berkshire	6	4	0	0	0	0	2	0	0	0	18	24	0	114
Cheshire	6	3	0	1	0	0	2	0	0	0	14	23	2	91
Dorset	6	3	0	2	0	0	1	0	0	0	15	22	0	89
Shropshire	6	2	0	0	0	0	4	0	0	0	13	20	0	81
Devon	6	2	0	1	0	0	3	0	0	0	7	22	0	73
Oxfordshire	6	2	0	2	0	0	2	0	0	0	9	22	0	71
Herefordshire	6	2	0	2	0	0	2	0	0	0	12	18	8	62
Cornwall	6	1	0	3	0	0	2	0	0	0	11	24	0	59
Wiltshire	6	1	0	4	0	0	1	0	0	0	9	24	0	53
Wales Minor Counties	6	0	0	5	0	0	1	0	0	0	9	21	2	32

== Final ==
The final featured the teams which finished with the most points in each Division, Berkshire and Lincolnshire – A repeat of the 2016 final. It began on 27 August 2016 at Banbury with the result being a victory for Berkshire by 6 wickets. Berkshire retained the title whilst Lincolnshire's most recent victory was in 2003.

27–30 August 2016
Scorecard

Lincolnshire	v	Berkshire
182 (57 overs); Matt Lineker 40 (60); Chris Peploe 5/71 (23 overs)		215 (69.4 overs); Euan Woods 97 (169); Andy Carter 4/58 (13.4 overs)
319 (139.4 overs); Matt Lineker 148 (332); Chris Peploe 6/113 (60 overs)		291/4 (72 overs); Jack Davies 127* (246); M Carter 2/74 (27 overs)

Berkshire won by 6 wickets
Banbury
Umpires: Hassan Adnan and N Pratt

- Lincolnshire won the toss and elected to bat
