= 2012 Minor Counties Championship =

108th Minor Counties Cricket Championship season

- Administrator(s): England and Wales Cricket Board
- Cricket format: (3 days, 4 day final)
- Tournament format(s): League system
- Champions: Cornwall (1st title)
- Participants: 20
- Matches: 61
- Most runs: Khalid Sawas (518 for Cheshire)
- Most wickets: Toby Bulcock (36 for Cumberland)

The 2012 Minor Counties Championship was the 108th Minor Counties Cricket Championship season. It was contested through two divisions: Eastern and Western. Cornwall became Minor County Champions for first time.

== Standings ==
- Pld = Played, W = Wins, W1 = Win in match reduced to single innings, L = Losses, L1 = Loss in match reduced to single innings, T = Ties, D = Draws, D1 = Draw in match reduced to single innings, A = Abandonments, Bat = Batting points, Bowl = Bowling points, Ded = Deducted points, Pts = Points, Net RPW = Net runs per wicket (runs per wicket for less runs per wicket against).

Teams receive 16 points for a win, 4 for a draw, or 8 for the team batting last in a draw with the scores level. Teams also received 12 points for a win, 6 for a draw and 4 points for losing a match reduced to a single innings. Matches abandoned without any play award 8 points to each team. Bonus points (a maximum of 4 batting points and 4 bowling points) may be scored during the first 90 overs of each team's first innings.

=== Eastern Division ===
Team	Pld	W	W1	L	L1	T	D	D1	A	Bat	Bowl	Ded	Pts	Net RPW
Buckinghamshire	6	3	0	0	0	0	2	0	1	10	16	0	90	6.359
Cambridgeshire	6	3	0	1	0	0	2	0	0	7	21	-2	82	0.639
Norfolk	6	1	0	0	0	0	5	0	0	15	21	0	72	16.477
Cumberland	6	2	0	1	0	0	3	0	0	6	19	0	69	14.467
Suffolk	6	1	0	1	0	0	4	0	0	14	21	-2	65	3.645
Staffordshire	6	1	0	1	0	0	2	0	2	7	11	0	58	-0.238
Northumberland	6	0	0	0	0	0	5	0	1	8	14	0	50	3.359
Hertfordshire	6	0	0	1	0	0	5	0	0	9	17	0	46	-8.066
Bedfordshire	6	0	0	2	0	0	4	0	0	9	18	-6	37	-22.030
Lincolnshire	6	0	0	4	0	0	2	0	0	5	18	0	31	-8.448

=== Western Division ===
Team	Pld	W	W1	L	L1	T	D	D1	A	Bat	Bowl	Ded	Pts	Net RPW
Cornwall (C)	6	3	0	0	0	0	3	0	0	7	21	0	88	2.512
Oxfordshire	6	2	0	0	0	0	3	0	1	8	19	0	79	3.960
Wiltshire	6	2	0	2	0	0	2	0	0	15	23	0	78	3.698
Shropshire	6	2	0	1	0	0	2	1	0	10	14	0	70	1.248
Dorset	6	1	0	1	0	0	2	0	2	12	13	0	65	0.353
Berkshire	6	1	0	1	0	0	4	0	0	11	18	0	61	0.045
Cheshire	6	1	0	2	0	0	2	0	1	8	20	0	60	0.420
Devon	6	0	1	0	0	0	4	0	1	7	11	0	54	6.380
Wales Minor Counties	6	0	0	3	1	0	1	0	1	4	15	0	35	-10.484
Herefordshire	6	0	0	2	0	0	3	1	0	3	15	-2	34	-10.408

== Final ==
9–12 September
Scorecard

Cornwall (H)	v	Buckinghamshire
257 (90 overs); CA Hunkin 77 (152); SF Stanway 4/73 (35 overs)		205/9 (90 overs); SA Khalid 36* (105); TG Sharp 5/76 (38 overs)
209 (94.1 overs); NS Curnow 53 (208); Faisal Ali 3/41 (14.1 overs)		111 (68.4 overs); Fahim Qureshi 39 (145); Shakeel Ahmed 7/36 (21.4 overs)

Cornwall won by 150 runs
Boscawen Park, Truro
Umpires: John Attridge and Geoff Callaway

- Buckinghamshire won the toss and elected to field.

== Averages ==
Most runs
Aggregate	Average	Player	County
518	57.55	Khalid Sawas	Cheshire
503	55.88	Martyn Cull	Suffolk
480	48.00	Joe Breet	Wiltshire
468	52.00	Matthew Jones	Berkshire
443	40.27	Dan Birch	Lincolnshire

Most wickets
Aggregate	Average	Player	County
36	13.47	Toby Bulcock	Cumberland
34	16.17	Daniel Woods	Cheshire
31	12.41	Paul McMahon	Cambridgeshire
30	14.23	Brett Houston	Lincolnshire
30	19.26	Sam Hockin	Cornwall
