= 2025 English cricket season =

County Championship
- Champions: Nottinghamshire
- Runners-up: Surrey

One-Day Cup
- Champions: Worcestershire
- Runners-up: Hampshire

T20 Blast
- Champions: Somerset
- Runners-up: Hampshire

Women's One-Day Cup
- Champions: Lancashire
- Runners-up: Hampshire

Women's T20 Blast
- Champions: Surrey
- Runners-up: Bears

Women's T20 County Cup
- Champions: Lancashire
- Runners-up: Surrey

The Hundred
- Champions: Northern Superchargers (women's); Oval Invincibles (men's)
- Runners-up: Southern Brave (women's); Trent Rockets (men's)

Wisden Cricketers of the Year
- Gus Atkinson, Liam Dawson, Sophie Ecclestone, Jamie Smith & Daniel Worrall

The 2025 English cricket season commenced on 4 April and finished on 27 September 2025.

It was the 125th season in which the County Championship has been an official competition and featured First-Class, List-A, and Twenty20 cricket competitions throughout England and Wales.

Following a restructure of domestic women's cricket, this was the inaugural season of competition in which counties were divided into Tiers.

For both men and women, the fifth edition of The Hundred was played from 5 – 31 August 2025.

== International tours ==
=== Zimbabwe men's tour ===
In May, Zimbabwe played England in a one-off Test match at Trent Bridge. England won the match by an innings and 45 runs.

=== West Indies men's tour ===
In May and June, West Indies toured England to play three Twenty20 International (T20I) and three One Day International (ODI) matches. England completed a clean sweep to win both series 3–0.

=== World Test Championship final ===
In June, the final of the 2023–2025 World Test Championship took place at Lord's. South Africa beat Australia by five wickets to win a senior ICC tournament for the first time in 27 years.

=== India men's tour ===
From June to August, India toured England to play five Test matches which formed part of the 2025–2027 World Test Championship. The series was drawn 2–2 after India won the final Test by six runs. Indian captain Shubman Gill was the leading runscorer in the series with 754 runs and was chosen as India's player of the series, Harry Brook was England's player of the series.

=== South Africa men's tour ===
In September, South Africa toured England for three ODI and three T20I matches. South Africa won the ODI series 2–1 and the T20I series was drawn 1-1 with one match abandoned.

=== West Indies women's tour ===
The West Indies women's team toured England in May and June to play three Women's Twenty20 International (WT20I) and three Women's One Day International (WODI) matches. England completed a clean sweep to win both series 3–0.

=== India women's tour ===
The India women's team toured England in June and July to play five WT20I and three WODI matches. India won the WT20I series 3–2 and the WODI series 2–1.

== Domestic cricket ==
=== County Championship ===
The County Championship began on 4 April and finished on 27 September with each team playing 14 fixtures. Nottinghamshire won the championship for the first time since 2010. Durham and Worcestershire were relegated from Division One, with Leicestershire and Glamorgan earning promotion from Division Two.

=== One-Day Cup ===
The One-Day Cup ran from 5 August to 20 September with the counties separated into two groups of nine. Worcestershire beat Hampshire by three wickets in a rain-affected final.

=== T20 Blast ===
The T20 Blast ran from 29 May until 13 September with the eighteen counties divided into two groups of nine - the North Group and the South Group. Somerset beat Hampshire by six wickets in the final.

=== The Hundred ===
The fifth season of The Hundred took place in August, with eight men's and eight women's teams competing. The Oval Invincibles won their third consecutive title in the men's competition and the Northern Superchargers won the women's tournament.

=== Women's T20 Blast ===
The Women's T20 Blast ran from 30 May to 27 July. The eight 'Tier 1' counties competed in a round-robin group and the 10 'Tier 2' counties were split into two groups, both competitions ended with a finals day. Surrey beat Bears in the Tier 1 final, Middlesex won the Tier 2 competition.

=== Women's One-Day Cup ===
The Women's One-Day Cup took place from 19 April until 21 September. The 'Tier 1' counties and 'Tier 2' counties competed in separate round-robin groups before knockout matches in September. Lancashire beat Hampshire to win the Tier 1 final, Yorkshire won the Tier 2 competition.

=== Women's T20 County Cup ===
The Women's Twenty20 Cup took place from 5 May to 26 May, with all 37 counties taking part in a knock-out competition. Lancashire beat Surrey in the final to claim the inaugural title.

=== National Counties Cricket ===
Buckinghamshire won the National Counties Championship, beating Devon by 19 runs in the final. The National Counties Trophy was won by Dorset who beat Shropshire in the final.
