= 2017 English cricket season =

County Championship
- Champions: Essex
- Runners-up: Lancashire
- Most runs: Kumar Sangakkara (1,491)
- Most wickets: Jamie Porter (75)

Royal London One-Day Cup
- Champions: Nottinghamshire
- Runners-up: Surrey
- Most runs: Alastair Cook (636)
- Most wickets: Sam Curran (20)

t20 Blast
- Champions: Nottinghamshire
- Runners-up: Warwickshire
- Most runs: Joe Denly (567)
- Most wickets: Clint McKay (23)

Women's Cricket Super League
- Champions: Western Storm
- Runners-up: Southern Vipers
- Most runs: Rachel Priest (261)
- Most wickets: Nat Sciver

Women's County Championship
- Champions: Lancashire
- Runners-up: Yorkshire
- Most runs: Suzie Bates (494)
- Most wickets: Sophie Ecclestone (27)

Women's Twenty20 Cup
- Champions: Lancashire
- Runners-up: Middlesex
- Most runs: Jodie Dibble (260)
- Most wickets: Clare Boycott (14)

PCA Player of the Year
- Samit Patel

Wisden Cricketers of the Year
- Ben Duckett, Younis Khan, Misbah-ul-Haq, Toby Roland-Jones, Chris Woakes

The 2017 English cricket season was the 118th in which the County Championship had been an official competition. The season, which began on 28 March and ended on 29 September, featured two global one-day competitions played in England and Wales, the 2017 ICC Champions Trophy and the 2017 Women's Cricket World Cup. England Women's team won the World Cup, defeating India in the final at Lord's. Pakistan beat India in the Champions Trophy final.

The season included men's international tours of England by South Africa and West Indies. England played four Test matches against South Africa and three against West Indies. Both teams also played One Day International (ODI) and Twenty20 International (T20I) series against England, whilst Ireland played a two ODI series against England.

The season also saw the first-class counties compete in the 2017 County Championship, 2017 Royal London One-Day Cup and 2017 NatWest t20 Blast competitions. Essex won the County Championship, and Nottinghamshire won both limited overs competitions. Lancashire Women won both the Women's County Championship and the Women's Twenty20 Cup. In the second season of the Women's Cricket Super League, the title was won by Western Storm, who defeated Southern Vipers in the final. The Minor Counties competed for the 2017 Minor Counties Championship and MCCA Knockout Trophy, both of which were won by Berkshire. Club and recreational cricket was played throughout both countries.

== Champions Trophy ==
The 2017 ICC Champions Trophy was held in England and Wales in June. Eight international men's teams competed in the tournament, which was won by Pakistan who defeated India in the final at The Oval. Group stage matches were played at The Oval, Edgbaston and at Sophia Gardens in Cardiff.

== Women's World Cup ==
The 2017 Women's Cricket World Cup was held in England in June and July. Eight international women's teams competed in the tournament on a round-robin basis. The top four teams after the round-robin stage qualified for semi-finals with the two winners reaching the final. England beat India in the final which was held at Lord's, and was a sell-out.

== International tours ==
Three international men's teams toured England during the season: Ireland, South Africa and West Indies. The Irish tour was a two ODI series, whilst the other tours all featured Test cricket as well as ODI and T20I matches. There were no women's tours to England during the season.

=== Ireland tour ===
The Irish team played two ODIs against England in early May in advance of the Champions Trophy. England won both matches.

=== South Africa tour ===
The tour by South Africa included matches played either side of the Champions Trophy. In late May, immediately before the start of the Champions Trophy, a three match ODI series was played, with England winning the series 2–1. After the tournament a three-match T20I series was played, England again winning 2–1.

The four match Test series between the two teams took place between the beginning of July and early August. England won the series 3–1.

=== West Indies tour ===
The West Indies toured England in August and September. Three Test matches were played, England winning the series 2–1. The series included the first day-night Test match to be played in England. A single T20I and a five match ODI series were played after the Tests, England winning the ODI series 4–0 whilst West Indies won the T20I. The final match of the ODI series was played on 29 September and was the final match played during the season.

== Domestic cricket ==
=== MCCU Matches ===
The season began with three rounds of first-class cricket matches played between first-class counties and the six MCC University teams. Each MCCU team played two matches, each against a first class county, between 28 March and 9 April.

=== County Championship ===
The men's County Championship saw a restructuring of the divisional structure for the start of the season. Division One was reduced to eight teams at the end of the 2016 season in order to reduce the number of Championship matches each county played to 14. Ten teams competed in Division Two for the first time, meaning that Division Two teams did not play each other home and away during the season.

Essex, who had been promoted from Division Two the previous season, won the County Championship. Middlesex, the 2016 Champions, and Warwickshire were relegated from Division One, with their places taken by Division Two champions Worcestershire and Nottinghamshire, who narrowly beat Northamptonshire to the second place spot in the division.

Middlesex's relegation from Division One was controversial. The club had been deducted two points for bowling a slow over rate during a match against Surrey at The Oval at the end of August in a match which was abandoned early when a crossbow bolt was fired on to the pitch. At the time Middlesex were batting but could have declared and made up the over rate in Surrey's second innings. They lost to Somerset on the final day of the season, with Somerset just one point above Middlesex in the table. The pitch at Taunton was investigated after Wayne Noon, the ECB cricket liaison officer at the ground for the match, marked it as "below average" for excessive spin on the first two days of the match – a factor which, it was suggested, would help Somerset's strong spin attack. No action was taken over the pitch quality after a further inspection took place, despite it being described as "doctored" and Somerset being called a "disgrace" by Middlesex's Chief Executive Angus Fraser. Middlesex subsequently appealed the decision to deduct the two points for the slow over rate at The Oval but the appeal was rejected by the ECB.

==== Division One ====
Team	Pld	W	L	D	Bat	Bowl	Ded	Pts
Essex (C)	14	10	0	4	28	40	0	248
Lancashire	14	5	3	6	29	37	0	176
Surrey	14	2	2	10	47	34	0	163
Yorkshire	14	4	5	5	24	35	0	148
Hampshire	14	3	3	8	24	36	0	148
Somerset	14	4	6	4	24	39	0	147
Middlesex (R)	14	3	4	7	28	37	2	146
Warwickshire (R)	14	1	9	4	19	31	0	86

Source: CricInfo

==== Division Two ====
Team	Pld	W	L	T	D	A	Bat	Bowl	Ded	Pts
Worcestershire (P)	14	9	3	0	2	0	45	39	0	238
Nottinghamshire (P)	14	7	2	0	5	0	44	41	0	222
Northamptonshire	14	9	3	0	2	0	29	39	5	217
Sussex	14	7	5	0	2	0	35	39	0	196
Kent	14	4	2	0	7	1	35	36	0	175
Gloucestershire	14	3	4	0	7	0	29	35	0	147
Glamorgan	14	3	7	0	4	0	25	40	0	133
Derbyshire	14	3	7	0	3	1	29	30	0	127
Durham	14	3	6	0	5	0	36	37	48	98
Leicestershire	14	0	9	0	5	0	32	34	16	75

Source: CricInfo

- Worcestershire and Nottinghamshire were promoted to Division One
- Durham were deducted 48 points by the ECB for accepting a financial aid package during the 2016 season.
- Leicestershire were deducted 16 points by the ECB for a breach in player conduct.
- Northamptonshire were deducted five points for a slow over rate against Nottinghamshire in August.

=== Royal London One-Day Cup ===
The Royal London One-Day Cup took place between April and July, with the eighteen counties organised into two regional groups. Nottinghamshire and Surrey advanced to the final, with Nottinghamshire winning the title.

=== NatWest t20 Blast ===
The T20 Blast took place between July and September, with the eighteen counties organised into two regional groups. Nottinghamshire beat Warwickshire in the final to claim their second title of the season.

=== Women's County Championship ===
The Women's County Championship was won by Lancashire, the county's first Championship title. The runners-up were Yorkshire. The season was the first with a changed format of three divisions with Division Three split into four geographic groups, replacing the previous system of four divisions.

=== Women's Twenty20 Cup ===
The Women's Twenty20 Cup was won by Lancashire, the county's first Twenty20 title. Middlesex finished as runners-up.

=== Women's Cricket Super League ===
The second edition of the Women's Cricket Super League took place in August and September. The final was a repeat of the previous season, but this time Western Storm beat defending champions Southern Vipers by 7 wickets.

=== Minor Counties Championship ===
The 3-day Minor Counties Championship ended in August, with Berkshire beating Lincolnshire in the final. Berkshire also won the 50-over MCCA Knockout Trophy.
