= 2023 National Counties Championship =

- Administrator(s): England and Wales Cricket Board
- Cricket format: 3 days (4 day final)
- Tournament format(s): League system and a final
- Champions: Buckinghamshire (10th title)
- Participants: 20
- Matches: 41
- Most runs: Sam Young (Dorset); 460 runs
- Most wickets: Conner Haddow (Buckinghamshire); 40 wickets

The 2023 National Counties Championship was the 118th National Counties Cricket Championship season. It was contested in two divisions. Berkshire were the defending champions, but they finished second in the Western Division 1 in 2023. Buckinghamshire won the title by defeating Devon in the final by 550 runs. The final was played in West Bromwich, Staffordshire. This was the 10th title for Buckinghamshire and their first since 2009.

== Standings ==
=== Format ===
Teams receive 16 points for a win, 8 for a tie and 4 for a draw. In a match reduced to single innings, teams receive 12 points for a win, 8 for a draw (6 if less than 20 overs per side) and 4 points for losing. For matches abandoned without play, both sides receive 8 points. Bonus points (a maximum of 4 batting points and 4 bowling points) may be scored during the first 90 overs of each team's first innings.

=== Eastern Division ===
Division 1

| Team | Pld | W | W1 | L | L1 | T | D | D1D | D1< | A | Bat | Bowl | Ded | Pts |
|---|---|---|---|---|---|---|---|---|---|---|---|---|---|---|
| Buckinghamshire | 4 | 2 | 0 | 1 | 0 | 0 | 1 | 0 | 0 | 0 | 13 | 16 | 0 | 65 |
| Staffordshire | 4 | 2 | 0 | 1 | 0 | 0 | 1 | 0 | 0 | 0 | 11 | 15 | 0 | 62 |
| Suffolk | 4 | 2 | 0 | 1 | 0 | 0 | 1 | 0 | 0 | 0 | 9 | 15 | 0 | 60 |
| Lincolnshire | 4 | 1 | 0 | 0 | 0 | 0 | 3 | 0 | 0 | 0 | 7 | 14 | 0 | 49 |
| Norfolk | 4 | 0 | 0 | 4 | 0 | 0 | 0 | 0 | 0 | 0 | 5 | 15 | 2 | 18 |

- Buckinghamshire were Eastern Division Champions.
- Buckinghamshire qualified for the NCCA Championship Final.
- Norfolk were relegated to Division Two.

Division 2

| Team | Pld | W | W1 | L | L1 | T | D | D1D | D1< | A | Bat | Bowl | Ded | Pts |
|---|---|---|---|---|---|---|---|---|---|---|---|---|---|---|
| Bedfordshire | 4 | 3 | 0 | 0 | 0 | 0 | 1 | 0 | 0 | 0 | 10 | 16 | 0 | 78 |
| Cambridgeshire | 4 | 1 | 0 | 1 | 0 | 0 | 2 | 0 | 0 | 0 | 13 | 13 | 0 | 50 |
| Hertfordshire | 4 | 1 | 0 | 1 | 0 | 0 | 2 | 0 | 0 | 0 | 5 | 16 | 0 | 45 |
| Northumberland | 4 | 1 | 0 | 2 | 0 | 0 | 1 | 0 | 0 | 0 | 4 | 14 | 0 | 38 |
| Cumbria | 4 | 0 | 0 | 2 | 0 | 0 | 2 | 0 | 0 | 0 | 5 | 15 | 0 | 28 |

- Bedfordshire were Eastern Division Two Champions.
- Bedfordshire were promoted to Division One.

=== Western Division ===
Division 1

| Team | Pld | W | W1 | L | L1 | T | D | D1D | D1< | A | Bat | Bowl | Ded | Pts |
|---|---|---|---|---|---|---|---|---|---|---|---|---|---|---|
| Devon | 4 | 2 | 0 | 1 | 0 | 0 | 1 | 0 | 0 | 0 | 10 | 13 | 0 | 59 |
| Berkshire | 4 | 1 | 0 | 0 | 0 | 0 | 3 | 0 | 0 | 0 | 6 | 16 | 0 | 50 |
| Oxfordshire | 4 | 1 | 0 | 1 | 0 | 0 | 2 | 0 | 0 | 0 | 9 | 16 | 0 | 49 |
| Cheshire | 4 | 1 | 0 | 1 | 0 | 0 | 1 | 0 | 0 | 1 | 4 | 12 | 0 | 44 |
| Herefordshire | 4 | 0 | 0 | 2 | 0 | 0 | 1 | 0 | 0 | 1 | 5 | 12 | 4 | 25 |

- Devon were Western Division Champions.
- Devon qualified for the NCCA Championship Final.
- Herefordshire were relegated to Division Two.

Division 2

| Team | Pld | W | W1 | L | L1 | T | D | D1D | D1< | Bat | Bowl | Ded | Pts |
|---|---|---|---|---|---|---|---|---|---|---|---|---|---|
| Cornwall | 4 | 2 | 0 | 0 | 0 | 0 | 2 | 0 | 0 | 10 | 13 | 0 | 66 |
| Wiltshire | 4 | 1 | 0 | 1 | 0 | 0 | 2 | 0 | 0 | 9 | 16 | 0 | 49 |
| Wales National County | 4 | 0 | 0 | 0 | 0 | 0 | 3 | 0 | 1 | 12 | 12 | 0 | 44 |
| Dorset | 4 | 0 | 0 | 1 | 0 | 0 | 3 | 0 | 0 | 13 | 14 | 0 | 39 |
| Shropshire | 4 | 1 | 0 | 2 | 0 | 0 | 0 | 0 | 1 | 6 | 8 | 2 | 36 |

- Cornwall were Western Division Two Champions.
- Cornwall were promoted to Division One.

== Final ==
The final featured the teams which finished with the most points in each Division One, Buckinghamshire and Devon. It began on 3 September 2023 at Sandwell Park with the result being a victory for Buckinghamshire by 550 runs. Buckinghamshire won their tenth title, with previous one being one in 2009, whilst Devon's most recent victory was in 2011.

3–6 September 2023
Scorecard

| Buckinghamshire | v | Devon |
| 185 (55.4 overs); Ewan Cox 35 (75); Jamie Stephens 4/29 (5.4 overs) | | 118 (60.5 overs); Elliot Hamilton 30 (145); Conner Haddow 3/31 (15 overs) |
| 567 (139.4 overs); Ross Richardson 166 (244); Max Finzel 2/3 (0.4 overs) | | 84 (36.1 overs); James Horler 16 (12); Conner Haddow 5/6 (10.1 overs) |

Buckinghamshire won by 550 runs
West Bromwich Dartmouth Cricket Club Ground, West Bromwich, Staffordshire
Umpires: Paul Nicholls and Jason Pitcher

- Buckinghamshire won the toss and decided to bat.
