= Jacques du Toit =

Jacques du Toit may refer to:

- Jacques du Toit (cricketer), South African-born cricketer
- Jacques du Toit (rugby union), South African-born rugby union player
