= 2025 National Counties Championship =

- Administrator: England and Wales Cricket Board
- Cricket format: 3 days (4 day final)
- Tournament format(s): League system and a final
- Champions: Buckinghamshire (11th title)
- Participants: 20
- Matches: 41
- Most runs: Joseph Eckland (Dorset); 456 runs
- Most wickets: Conner Haddow (Buckinghamshire); 41 wickets

The 2025 National Counties Championship was the 120th National Counties Cricket Championship season. It was contested in two divisions. The title from last season was shared between Staffordshire and Berkshire, but neither team reached the final this season. The final was played in West Bromwich. Buckinghamshire won the title by defeating Devon in the final by 19 runs. This was the 11th title for Buckinghamshire, the last one of which has been won two years ago against the same opponent.

== Standings ==
=== Format ===
Teams receive 16 points for a win, 8 for a tie and 4 for a draw. In a match reduced to single innings, teams receive 12 points for a win, 8 for a draw (6 if less than 20 overs per side) and 4 points for losing. For matches abandoned without play, both sides receive 8 points. Bonus points (a maximum of 4 batting points and 4 bowling points) may be scored during the first 90 overs of each team's first innings.

=== Eastern Division ===
Division 1

| Team | Pld | W | W1 | L | L1 | T | D | D1D | D1< | A | Bat | Bowl | Ded | Pts |
|---|---|---|---|---|---|---|---|---|---|---|---|---|---|---|
| Buckinghamshire | 4 | 2 | 0 | 0 | 0 | 0 | 2 | 0 | 0 | 0 | 4 | 12 | 0 | 56 |
| Suffolk | 4 | 1 | 0 | 1 | 0 | 0 | 2 | 0 | 0 | 0 | 11 | 16 | 0 | 51 |
| Staffordshire | 4 | 1 | 0 | 1 | 0 | 0 | 2 | 0 | 0 | 0 | 9 | 16 | 0 | 49 |
| Cambridgeshire | 4 | 0 | 0 | 0 | 0 | 0 | 4 | 0 | 0 | 0 | 12 | 15 | 0 | 43 |
| Lincolnshire | 4 | 0 | 0 | 2 | 0 | 0 | 2 | 0 | 0 | 0 | 10 | 9 | 0 | 27 |

- Buckinghamshire were Eastern Division Champions.
- Buckinghamshire qualified for the NCCA Championship Final.
- Lincolnshire were relegated to Division Two.

Division 2

| Team | Pld | W | W1 | L | L1 | T | D | D1D | D1< | A | Bat | Bowl | Ded | Pts |
|---|---|---|---|---|---|---|---|---|---|---|---|---|---|---|
| Northumberland | 4 | 3 | 0 | 1 | 0 | 0 | 0 | 0 | 0 | 0 | 10 | 16 | 0 | 74 |
| Norfolk | 4 | 1 | 0 | 0 | 0 | 0 | 2 | 0 | 0 | 1 | 4 | 12 | 0 | 48 |
| Bedfordshire | 4 | 1 | 0 | 1 | 0 | 0 | 2 | 0 | 0 | 0 | 12 | 11 | 0 | 47 |
| Hertfordshire | 4 | 0 | 0 | 1 | 0 | 0 | 3 | 0 | 0 | 0 | 7 | 10 | 0 | 29 |
| Cumbria | 4 | 0 | 0 | 2 | 0 | 0 | 1 | 0 | 0 | 1 | 4 | 9 | 0 | 25 |

- Northumberland were Eastern Division Two Champions.
- Northumberland were promoted to Division One.

=== Western Division ===
Division 1

| Team | Pld | W | W1 | L | L1 | T | D | D1D | D1< | A | Bat | Bowl | Ded | Pts |
|---|---|---|---|---|---|---|---|---|---|---|---|---|---|---|
| Devon | 4 | 1 | 0 | 0 | 0 | 0 | 3 | 0 | 0 | 0 | 10 | 16 | 0 | 54 |
| Berkshire | 4 | 0 | 0 | 0 | 0 | 0 | 4 | 0 | 0 | 0 | 13 | 15 | 0 | 44 |
| Oxfordshire | 4 | 0 | 0 | 0 | 0 | 0 | 4 | 0 | 0 | 0 | 11 | 15 | 0 | 42 |
| Herefordshire | 4 | 0 | 0 | 0 | 0 | 0 | 4 | 0 | 0 | 0 | 13 | 12 | 0 | 41 |
| Cornwall | 4 | 0 | 0 | 1 | 0 | 0 | 3 | 0 | 0 | 0 | 8 | 16 | 0 | 36 |

- Devon were Western Division Champions.
- Devon qualified for the NCCA Championship Final.
- Cornwall were relegated to Division Two.

Division 2

| Team | Pld | W | W1 | L | L1 | T | D | D1D | D1< | Bat | Bowl | Ded | Pts |
|---|---|---|---|---|---|---|---|---|---|---|---|---|---|
| Wiltshire | 4 | 2 | 0 | 0 | 0 | 0 | 2 | 0 | 0 | 13 | 15 | 0 | 68 |
| Dorset | 4 | 2 | 0 | 1 | 0 | 0 | 1 | 0 | 0 | 15 | 16 | 0 | 67 |
| Cheshire | 4 | 1 | 0 | 3 | 0 | 0 | 0 | 0 | 0 | 12 | 15 | 0 | 55 |
| Shropshire | 4 | 0 | 0 | 2 | 0 | 0 | 2 | 0 | 0 | 8 | 16 | 0 | 32 |
| Wales National County | 4 | 0 | 0 | 2 | 0 | 0 | 2 | 0 | 0 | 7 | 15 | 0 | 30 |

- Wiltshire were Western Division Two Champions.
- Wiltshire were promoted to Division One.

== Final ==
The final featured the teams which finished with the most points in each Division One, Buckinghamshire and Devon. It began on 7 September 2025 at West Bromwich Dartmouth Cricket Club Ground with the result being a victory for Buckinghamshire by 19 runs. Buckinghamshire won their eleventh title, with previous one being one in 2023, whilst Devon's most recent victory was in 2011.

7–10 September 2025
Scorecard

| Buckinghamshire | v | Devon |
| 217 (69.3 overs); Alexei Kervezee 89 (108); Callum Harvey 6/60 (22 overs) | | 166 (55.2 overs); Ben Privett 67 (101); Conner Haddow 7/70 (27.2 overs) |
| 138 (42.2 overs); Ewan Cox 36 (30); Callum Harvey 6/40 (19.2 overs) | | 170 (51.5 overs); Matt Thompson 30 (79); Conner Haddow 9/73 (25.5 overs) |

Buckinghamshire won by 19 runs
West Bromwich Dartmouth Cricket Club Ground, West Bromwich
Umpires: Ian Laurence and Bilal Shafayat

- Buckinghamshire won the toss and decided to bat.
