= Tring Park Cricket Club Ground =

Cricket ground in England

Coordinates: 51°47′43″N 0°39′07″W

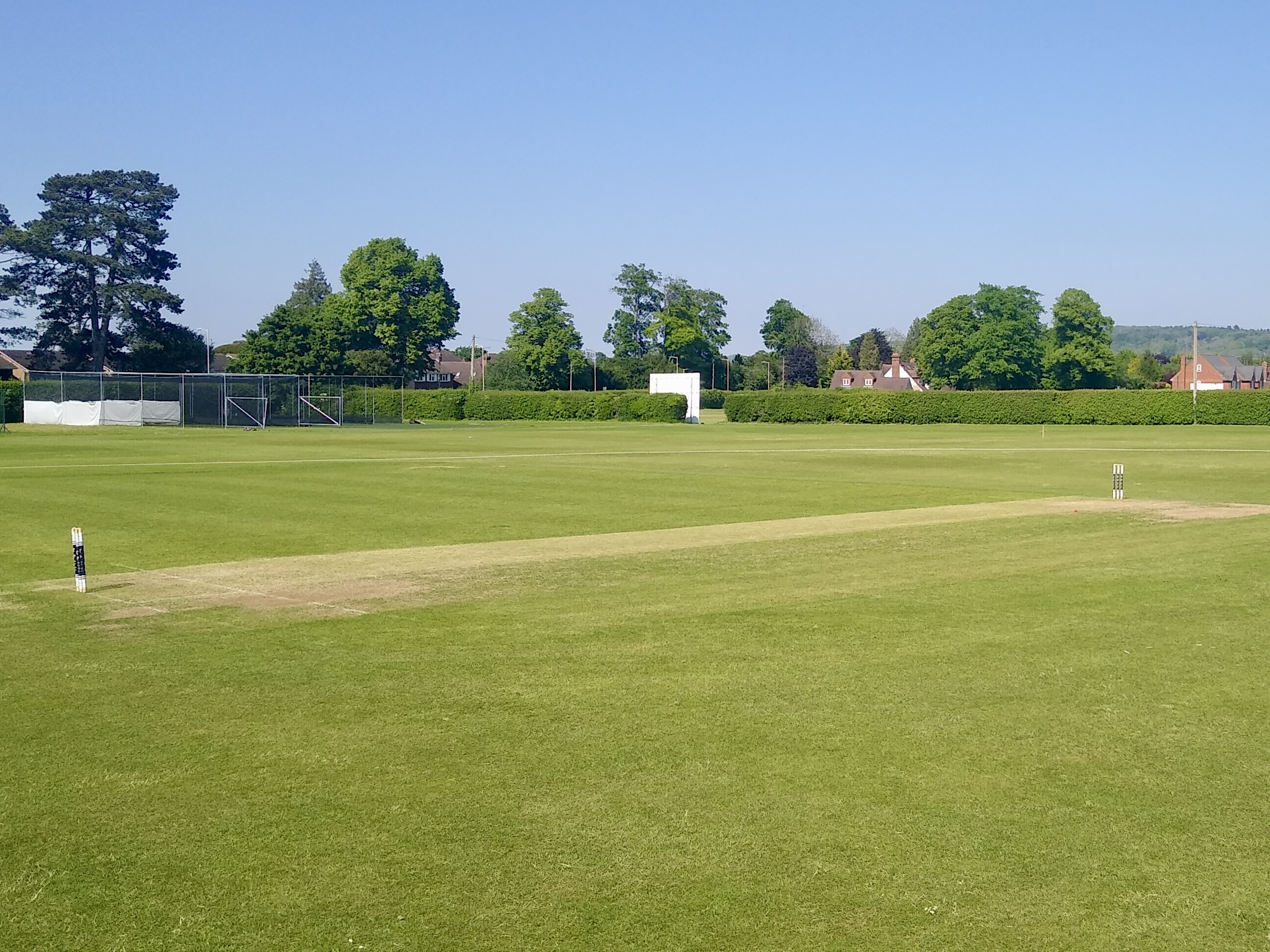
- Interactive map of Tring Park Cricket Club Ground

Ground information
- Location: Tring, Hertfordshire
- Country: England
- Establishment: 1874

International information
- Only women's ODI: 23 June 1973: Australia v Trinidad and Tobago

Team information
| Buckinghamshire | (2009–present) |
| Northamptonshire | (1974–1991) |
| Hertfordshire | (1959–1999) |
- As of 6 September 2020; Source: Ground profile

Tring Park Cricket Club Ground currently known as London Road is a cricket ground in Tring, Hertfordshire. Tring Park Cricket Club have played on the ground since 1874. The club's 1st XI is currently in the Home Counties Premier Cricket League.

Hertfordshire played Buckinghamshire in the ground's first Minor Counties Championship match in 1959. From 1959 to 1999, the ground played host to 12 Minor Counties Championship matches and a single MCCA Knockout Trophy match. In 2009, Buckinghamshire began using the venue as one of their home grounds when they played Lincolnshire in the Minor Counties Championship; they used the ground in 2010 for a single match.

The ground has also hosted List-A matches played by Northamptonshire. The first List-A match on the ground came in the 1974 John Player League between Northamptonshire and Middlesex. From 1974 to 1991, the ground held 16 List-A matches, the last of which was between Northamptonshire and Surrey.

The ground hosted a single Women's One Day International between Australia women and Trinidad and Tobago women in the 1973 Women's Cricket World Cup.
