= Joseph Eckland =

English cricketer (born 2004)

Personal information
- Full name: Joseph Robert Eckland
- Born: 22 May 2004 (age 22); Yeovil, Somerset, England
- Batting: Right-handed
- Role: Wicket-keeper
- Relatives: Vic Marks (uncle)

Domestic team information
- Years: Team
- 2023–2024: Hampshire
- 2026: Gloucestershire
- List A debut: 1 August 2023 Hampshire v Middlesex

Career statistics
Competition	LA
Matches	16
Runs scored	296
Batting average	24.66
100s/50s	0/2
Top score	72
Catches/stumpings	8/–
- Source: Cricinfo, 11 August 2026

Joseph Robert Eckland (born 22 May 2004) is an English cricketer who plays for Gloucestershire County Cricket Club. He is a right handed batsman and wicket-keeper.

== Early life ==
Eckland was born in Yeovil, Somerset and has represented Dorset CCC since 2022, and the Hampshire Academy. He represented England U19s in 2022 and 2023.

Eckland attended Millfield School in Street, Somerset before leaving to sign a professional contract with Hampshire CCC. As a schoolboy Eckland had represented the Somerset Cricket Board age groups until the age of 14 before he moved to the Dorset Cricket Board because of his then affiliation to North Perrott Cricket Club.

Eckland is the great nephew of former Somerset CCC and England spinner Vic Marks.

== Career ==
Eckland signed his first rookie contract for Hampshire in March 2023. He made his debut for the side in the first round of the 2023 One-Day Cup against Middlesex finishing with a score of 2 not out and a catch. He would go on to make a further five appearances in the 2023 competition, with a high score of 72 runs against Yorkshire in York. He made a further four appearances in the 2024 One-Day Cup.

With Dorset, he scored the most runs (456) during the 2025 National Counties Championship.

Following his release from Hampshire he signed a short-term contract with Gloucestershire in July 2026.
