= 1895 Minor Counties Championship =

- Cricket format: 2 days
- Tournament format: League system
- Champions: Durham, Norfolk, Worcestershire
- Participants: 14
- Matches: 40
- Most runs: Thomas Pointon (382 for Cheshire)
- Most wickets: Peter Rogers (60 for Oxfordshire)

The 1895 Minor Counties Championship was the first running of the Minor Counties Cricket Championship, and ran from 3 June to 29 August 1895. The inaugural title was shared between three counties—Durham, Norfolk and Worcestershire—as they finished level on three points apiece.

The leading run-scorer was Thomas Pointon, playing for Cheshire, whose score of 110 against Durham was one of only six centuries scored over the course of the season. The leading wicket-taker, Oxfordshire's Peter Rogers, took three ten wicket match hauls.

== Table ==
- One point was awarded for a win, and one point was taken away for each loss.

| Team | Pld | W | L | D | Pts |
|---|---|---|---|---|---|
| Durham | 8 | 4 | 1 | 3 | 3 |
| Norfolk | 8 | 4 | 1 | 3 | 3 |
| Worcestershire | 10 | 5 | 2 | 3 | 3 |
| Buckinghamshire ‡ | 4 | 3 | 1 | 0 | 2 |
| Berkshire ‡ | 2 | 1 | 0 | 1 | 1 |
| Northamptonshire ‡ | 2 | 1 | 0 | 1 | 1 |
| Wiltshire ‡ | 2 | 1 | 1 | 0 | 0 |
| Bedfordshire | 8 | 3 | 4 | 1 | –1 |
| Cambridgeshire ‡ | 2 | 0 | 1 | 1 | –1 |
| Cheshire ‡ | 6 | 1 | 2 | 3 | –1 |
| Oxfordshire | 8 | 2 | 3 | 3 | –1 |
| Hertfordshire | 8 | 2 | 4 | 2 | –2 |
| Lincolnshire ‡ | 4 | 0 | 3 | 1 | –3 |
| Staffordshire | 8 | 0 | 4 | 4 | –4 |

Notes

- denotes the Champion team(s).
- ‡ denotes a team that failed to play the minimum of eight matches. These teams are sometimes omitted from the table altogether.

== Averages ==
Most runs
| Aggregate | Average | Player | County |
|---|---|---|---|
| 382 | 47.75 | Thomas Pointon | Cheshire |
| 364 | 40.44 | James Welford | Durham |
| 305 | 25.41 | William Brown | Staffordshire |
| 286 | 23.83 | John Young | Durham |
| 275 | 27.50 | John Skrimshire | Norfolk |

Most wickets
| Aggregate | Average | Player | County |
|---|---|---|---|
| 60 | 11.90 | Peter Rogers | Oxfordshire |
| 57 | 9.05 | Charles Shore | Norfolk |
| 50 | 12.68 | Brusher Rogers | Oxfordshire |
| 50 | 13.86 | Sam Raynor | Worcestershire |
| 49 | 11.75 | William Brown | Bedfordshire |
