= Edenside =

Cricket ground in England

Coordinates: 54°54′03″N 2°56′22″W

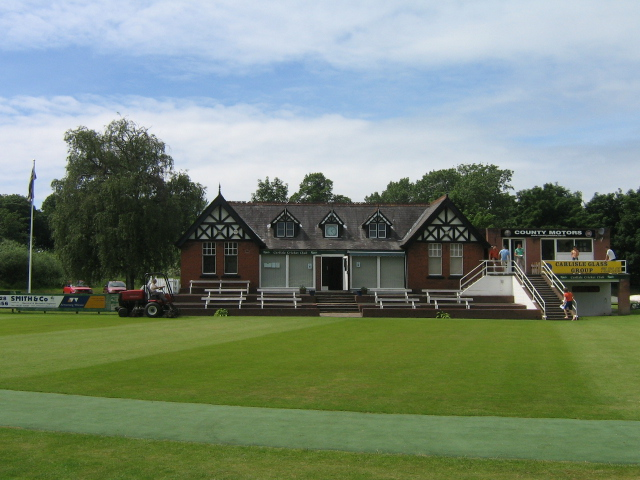
- Interactive map of Edenside

Ground information
- Location: Carlisle, Cumbria
- Country: England
- Establishment: 1850 (first recorded match)

Team information
Cumbria County Cricket Club	(1955–present)
- As of 27 July 2010; Source: Ground profile

Edenside is a cricket ground in Carlisle, Cumbria. The ground is the primary home ground of Cumbria County Cricket Club.

The first recorded match on the ground was in 1850, when Carlisle played an All England Eleven. The ground hosted its first Minor Counties Championship match when Cumberland played the Yorkshire Second XI in 1955. From 1955 to present, the ground has hosted 45 Minor Counties Championship matches. To date the ground has not hosted any MCCA Knockout Trophy matches.

The ground has hosted 2 List-A matches, the first of which saw Cumberland play Middlesex in the 1996 NatWest Trophy. The second List-A match played on Edenside saw Cumberland play Kent in the 2000 NatWest Trophy. The home county lost both of these matches against their professional, first-class opponents.

In local domestic cricket, Edenside is the home ground of Carlisle Cricket Club, who play in the North Lancashire and Cumbria League Premier Division.

== Flooding ==
Being situated on the banks of the River Eden, the ground has suffered incidents of flooding in its history. The ground was flooded to a depth of several feet in 2005, which resulted in the destruction of its facilities and a subsequent replacement and improvement of facilities The ground was once again flooded during the 2009 floods which hit Cumbria, covering the ground in 3–4 feet of water.
