= Tom Nugent (cricketer) =

English cricketer (born 1994)

Personal information
- Full name: Thomas Michael Nugent
- Born: 11 July 1994 (age 32); Bath, Somerset, England
- Batting: Right-handed
- Bowling: Right-arm fast-medium

Domestic team information
- Years: Team
- 2012–2024: Berkshire
- 2014: Hampshire
- 2015: Loughborough MCCU

Career statistics
Competition	First-class	List A
Matches	1	1
Runs scored	4	0
Batting average	–	–
100s/50s	–/–	–/–
Top score	4*	–
Balls bowled	150	24
Wickets	3	1
Bowling average	35.66	15.00
5 wickets in innings	–	–
10 wickets in match	–	–
Best bowling	2/32	1/15
Catches/stumpings	1/–	–/–
- Source: Cricinfo, 18 September 2024

Thomas Michael Nugent (born 11 July 1994) is an English former cricketer who played for Hampshire in List A cricket and had an extensive career with Berkshire in minor counties cricket.

== Cricket career ==
Nugent was born in July 1994 in Bath, Somerset. He was educated at The Oratory School. Having made his way up through the Oxfordshire youth cricket system, he was chosen by then Berkshire captain Bjorn Mordt to play for Berkshire in 2012, debuting in the MCCA Knockout Trophy against Wales Minor Counties, and during the same season in the Minor Counties Championship against Oxfordshire. Beginning in 2012, Nugent began playing Second Eleven cricket for Hampshire, with him making a single senior appearance for Hampshire in a List A one-day match against Sri Lanka A at the Rose Bowl. The match was abandoned after 18 overs, with Nugent taking the wicket of Bhanuka Rajapaksa in the Sri Lankan A innings. Having matriculated to Loughborough University to study chemical engineering, he made a single appearance in first-class cricket for Loughborough MCCU against Nottinghamshire at Trent Bridge in 2015, with Nugent taking the wickets of internationals Alex Hales, James Taylor, and Brendan Taylor with his right-arm fast-medium bowling.

Nugent continued to play minor counties cricket for Berkshire until his retirement in 2024, making 39 appearances in the Minor Counties Championship, 51 in the MCCA Knockout Trophy, and 16 in the Minor Counties T20. During his thirteen seasons with Berkshire, he won seventeen minor counties titles across all three formats of the game, and in the twelve outright finals in which he played he was never on the losing side. He took 265 wickets for Berkshire across all three formats, taking fourteen five wicket hauls. In the Minor Counties Championship, he took 175 wickets at an average of 19.23, with Berkshire coach Tom Lambert proffering that Nugent was the most outstanding red-ball bowler of recent times in minor counties cricket. In club cricket, Nugent captains Henley in the Home Counties Premier Cricket League.

== External list ==
- Tom Nugent at Cricinfo
