= White Post Road =

Cricket ground in Oxfordshire, England

- Banbury Cricket Club Ground
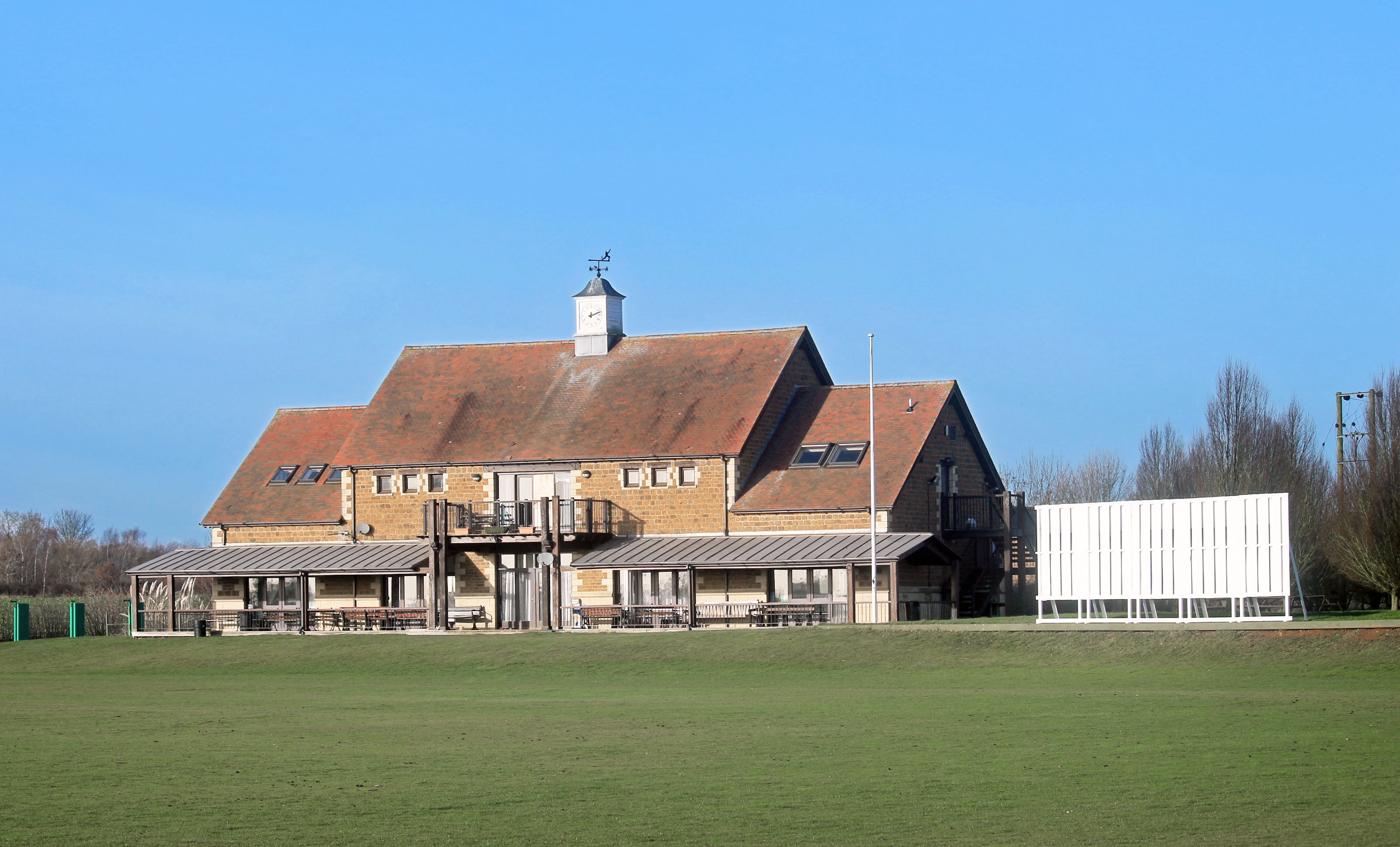

Ground information
- Location: Bodicote, Oxfordshire
- Coordinates: 52.0399°N 1.3337°W
- Establishment: 1996

Team information
Oxfordshire	(1996-present)
- As of 16 August 2010; Source: Ground profile

White Post Road (also known as Banbury Cricket Club Ground) is a cricket ground in Bodicote, Oxfordshire.

== History ==
Banbury Cricket Club originally played in Banbury at Grange Road, (Note: Grange Road played host to four Minor Counties Championship matches for Oxfordshire, and was also a host venue for a match in the 1979 ICC Trophy between Argentina and Papua New Guinea.) but the Banbury Recreational Trust sold the ground to a housing developer. The Trust moved the cricket club to a new ground close by at White Post Road in the neighbouring village of Bodicote, with the new ground being ready for the 1996 season. Oxfordshire first played minor counties cricket there against Dorset in the 1997 Minor Counties Championship. Oxfordshire later played two List A one-day matches there against Herefordshire in the 1st round of the 2003 Cheltenham & Gloucester Trophy (played in 2002) and the Lancashire Cricket Board in the 1st round of the 2004 Cheltenham & Gloucester Trophy (played in 2003). As of 2025, Oxfordshire continues to play national counties (formerly minor counties) fixtures at the ground, having also played NCCA Knockout Trophy and National Counties T20 matches there.

== Records ==
=== List A ===
- Highest team total: 267 for 9 (50 overs) by Herefordshire v Oxfordshire, 2003
- Lowest team total: 141 all out (31.4 overs) by Oxfordshire v Herefordshire, as above
- Highest individual innings: 67 not out by Stephen Dearden for Lancashire Cricket Board v Oxfordshire, 2002
- Best bowling in an innings: 5-19 by Franklyn Rose for Herefordshire v Oxfordshire, 2003

== See also ==
- List of Oxfordshire County Cricket Club grounds
