= Jacques du Toit (cricketer) =

South African cricketer

Jacques Du Toit
Personal information
- Full name: Jacques Du Toit
- Born: 2 January 1980 (age 46); Port Elizabeth, South Africa
- Nickname: Dutch
- Batting: Right-handed
- Bowling: Right-arm medium-fast
- Role: Batsman

Domestic team information
- Years: Team
- 1998/99–2004/05: Easterns
- 2008–2012: Leicestershire (squad no. 8)
- 2010/11: Colombo
- 2013–2017: Northumberland
- 2018–2019: Cumberland

Career statistics
Competition	FC	LA	T20
Matches	41	52	55
Runs scored	1,944	1,243	646
Batting average	31.35	26.44	15.02
100s/50s	4/10	2/4	0/1
Top score	154	144	69
Balls bowled	624	66	32
Wickets	6	2	2
Bowling average	72.66	33.00	33.00
5 wickets in innings	0	0	0
10 wickets in match	0	0	0
Best bowling	3/31	2/30	2/30
Catches/stumpings	32/–	19/–	28/–
- Source: Cricinfo, 20 May 2022

Jacques Du Toit (born 2 January 1980) is a cricketer who played for Leicestershire. He is a middle order right handed batsman who can also bowl medium fast.

Originally from South Africa, English qualified Du Toit played for Leicestershire between 2008 and 2012. In 2008 he made his maiden first class century against Northamptonshire and his highest one day score came when he scored 144 from 119 balls in the Pro40 game with Glamorgan, although it was not enough to prevent a four-wicket defeat.

The 2010 was successful, with Du Toit scoring 899 County Championship runs, culminating im him signing a new two-year contract. His performances in all forms of the county game earned him the honour of winning Leicestershire's Supporter's Player of the Year.

== Career best performances ==
	Batting				Bowling (innings)			
	Score	Fixture	Venue	Season	Figures	Fixture	Venue	Season
FC	154	Leicestershire v Cambridge MCCU	Cambridge	2010	3/31	Leicestershire v Gloucestershire	Leicester	2008
LA	144	Leicestershire v Glamorgan	Colwyn Bay	2008	2/30	Easterns v KwaZulu-Natal	Benoni	2004
T20	69	Leicestershire v Lancashire	Leicester	2010	2/15	Leicestershire v Derbyshire	Leicester	2008
