= National Counties Cricket Championship =

Cricket competition in England and Wales

NCCA 3 Day Championship
- Administrator: England and Wales Cricket Board
- Format: 3 days
- First edition: 1895
- Tournament format: Two 10-team divisions; matches played home and away
- Number of teams: 20
- Current champion: Devon
- Most successful: Staffordshire (14 titles)

The National Counties Cricket Championship or NCCA 3 Day Championship, formerly known as the Minor Counties Cricket Championship, is an annual season-long competition in England and Wales that is contested by the teams of the National Counties Cricket Association (NCCA), the so-called National Counties (previously called the Minor Counties), county clubs that do not have first-class status.

The competition began in 1895; the honorary secretary of Worcestershire CCC, Paul Foley, was influential in its creation.

== History ==
The Minor Counties/National Counties Championship has been contested annually since 1895, apart from the two World War periods and a cancelled season in 2020 due to COVID-19. From 2014 to 2019 the tournament was known as the Unicorns Championship.

Four clubs which used to play in the Minor Counties Championship have been granted first-class status – Worcestershire in 1899; Northamptonshire in 1905; Glamorgan in 1921 and Durham in 1992.

Until 1959, when the Second XI Championship was founded, most second XIs of the first-class counties used to contest the Minor Counties. A few continued to do so and the last to withdraw was Somerset 2nd XI after the 1987 season.

Until 1983 all clubs competed in a single league. Teams played varying numbers of matches and did not play all other counties, so the table was ranked according to average points gained per match. The team with the highest average won the championship, except in a year when the top two counties had not played each other. In this case the second-placed team in the table had the right to challenge the leaders to a match to decide the championship. The second-placed team had to win this Challenge Match to take the title, with the league leaders being declared champions if they won or the game was drawn. Since 1983, the clubs have been split into an Eastern and a Western Division. The winners of the two divisions play each other in a match at the end of the season to determine which will be the Champions.

At present, there are twenty clubs involved. Nineteen represent English counties and the other is a Wales team that represents all the Welsh counties except Glamorgan.

== List of Minor Counties/National Counties champions ==
- 1895 Shared title.
  - Durham,
  - Norfolk,
  - Worcestershire
- 1896 Worcestershire
- 1897 Worcestershire
- 1898 Worcestershire
- 1899 Shared title
  - Northamptonshire,
  - Buckinghamshire
- 1900 Shared title
  - Durham,
  - Glamorgan,
  - Northamptonshire
- 1901 Durham
- 1902 Wiltshire
- 1903 Northamptonshire
- 1904 Northamptonshire
- 1905 Norfolk
- 1906 Staffordshire
- 1907 Lancashire II
- 1908 Staffordshire
- 1909 Wiltshire
- 1910 Norfolk
- 1911 Staffordshire
- 1912 Shared title
  - Staffordshire,
  - Norfolk
- 1913 Norfolk
- 1914 Staffordshire
- 1915 – 1919 not contested
- 1920 Staffordshire
- 1921 Staffordshire
- 1922 Buckinghamshire
- 1923 Buckinghamshire
- 1924 Berkshire
- 1925 Buckinghamshire
- 1926 Durham
- 1927 Staffordshire
- 1928 Berkshire
- 1929 Oxfordshire
- 1930 Durham
- 1931 Leicestershire II
- 1932 Buckinghamshire
- 1933 Yorkshire II
- 1934 Lancashire II
- 1935 Middlesex II
- 1936 Hertfordshire
- 1937 Lancashire II
- 1938 Buckinghamshire
- 1939 Surrey II
- 1940 – 1945 not contested
- 1946 Suffolk
- 1947 Yorkshire II
- 1948 Lancashire II
- 1949 Lancashire II
- 1950 Surrey II
- 1951 Kent II
- 1952 Buckinghamshire
- 1953 Berkshire
- 1954 Surrey II
- 1955 Surrey II
- 1956 Kent II
- 1957 Yorkshire II
- 1958 Yorkshire II
- 1959 Warwickshire II
- 1960 Lancashire II
- 1961 Somerset II
- 1962 Warwickshire II
- 1963 Cambridgeshire
- 1964 Lancashire II
- 1965 Somerset II
- 1966 Lincolnshire
- 1967 Cheshire
- 1968 Yorkshire II
- 1969 Buckinghamshire
- 1970 Bedfordshire
- 1971 Yorkshire II
- 1972 Bedfordshire
- 1973 Shropshire
- 1974 Oxfordshire
- 1975 Hertfordshire
- 1976 Durham
- 1977 Suffolk
- 1978 Devon
- 1979 Suffolk
- 1980 Durham
- 1981 Durham
- 1982 Oxfordshire
- 1983 Hertfordshire
- 1984 Durham
- 1985 Cheshire
- 1986 Cumberland
- 1987 Buckinghamshire
- 1988 Cheshire
- 1989 Oxfordshire
- 1990 Hertfordshire
- 1991 Staffordshire
- 1992 Staffordshire
- 1993 Staffordshire
- 1994 Devon
- 1995 Devon
- 1996 Devon
- 1997 Devon
- 1998 Staffordshire
- 1999 Cumberland
- 2000 Dorset
- 2001 shared title
  - Cheshire,
  - Lincolnshire
- 2002 shared title
  - Herefordshire,
  - Norfolk
- 2003 Lincolnshire
- 2004 shared title
  - Bedfordshire,
  - Devon
- 2005 shared title
  - Cheshire,
  - Suffolk
- 2006 Devon
- 2007 Cheshire
- 2008 Berkshire
- 2009 Buckinghamshire
- 2010 Dorset
- 2011 Devon
- 2012 Cornwall
- 2013 Cheshire
- 2014 Staffordshire
- 2015 Cumberland
- 2016 Berkshire
- 2017 Berkshire
- 2018 Berkshire
- 2019 Berkshire
- 2020 not contested
- 2021 Oxfordshire
- 2022 Berkshire
- 2023 Buckinghamshire
- 2024 shared title
  - Berkshire,
  - Staffordshire
- 2025 Buckinghamshire
- 2026 Devon

=== Finals summary ===
In 1983, the then minor counties were divided into a Western Division and an Eastern Division, the winners of each division meeting in a final to decide the overall winner. From 1983 to 1993, the Championship was decided by a 55-over limited overs match. From 1994, the final was decided by a two-day, two-innings match with certain restrictions on the first innings. From 1999 the final was a three-day, two-innings match, with the match now a four-day, two-innings match.

Year	Western Division	Eastern Division	Venue	Result
1983	Buckinghamshire	Hertfordshire	New Road, Worcester	Hertfordshire won by 2 wickets
1984	Cheshire	Durham	New Road, Worcester	Durham won by 6 wickets
1985	Cheshire	Suffolk	New Road, Worcester	Cheshire won by 58 runs
1986	Oxfordshire	Cumberland	New Road, Worcester	Cumberland won by 2 wickets
1987	Buckinghamshire	Cambridgeshire	New Road, Worcester	Buckinghamshire won by losing fewer wickets
1988	Cheshire	Cambridgeshire	New Road, Worcester	Cheshire won by 13 runs
1989	Oxfordshire	Hertfordshire	New Road, Worcester	Oxfordshire won by 7 wickets
1990	Berkshire	Hertfordshire	Wardown Park, Luton	Hertfordshire won by 7 wickets
1991	Oxfordshire	Staffordshire	Wardown Park, Luton	Staffordshire won by 10 wickets
1992	Devon	Staffordshire	New Road, Worcester	Staffordshire won by 79 runs
1993	Cheshire	Staffordshire	New Road, Worcester	Staffordshire won by 5 wickets
1994	Devon	Cambridgeshire	New Road, Worcester	Drawn (Devon won on 1st innings points)
1995	Devon	Lincolnshire	New Road, Worcester	Devon won by 57 runs (single-innings match)
1996	Devon	Norfolk	The Maer Ground, Exmouth	Devon by 168 runs
1997	Devon	Bedfordshire	Wardown Park, Luton	Drawn (Devon won on faster scoring rate)
1998	Dorset	Staffordshire	Dean Park, Bournemouth	Drawn (Staffordshire won on qualifying record)
1999	Dorset	Cumberland	Parkside Road, Kendal	Cumberland won by 6 wickets
2000	Dorset	Cumberland	Kinson Park Road, Bournemouth	Dorset won by 5 wickets
2001	Cheshire	Lincolnshire	Gorse Lane, Grantham	Drawn (title shared)
2002	Herefordshire	Norfolk	Mortimer Park, Kingsland	Drawn (title shared)
2003	Devon	Lincolnshire	Sports Ground, Cleethorpes	Lincolnshire won by 8 wickets
2004	Devon	Bedfordshire	The Maer Ground, Exmouth	Drawn (title shared)
2005	Cheshire	Suffolk	Ransomes and Reavell Sports Club Ground, Ipswich	Drawn (title shared)
2006	Devon	Buckinghamshire	The Maer Ground, Exmouth	Devon won by 180 runs
2007	Cheshire	Northumberland	Osborne Avenue, Jesmond	Cheshire won by an innings and 4 runs
2008	Berkshire	Lincolnshire	Enborne Lodge, Newbury	Berkshire won by 8 wickets
2009	Cheshire	Buckinghamshire	Upton Court Road, Slough	Buckinghamshire won by 117 runs
2010	Dorset	Lincolnshire	Dean Park, Bournemouth	Dorset won by 135 runs
2011	Devon	Cambridgeshire	The Avenue Sports Club Ground, March	Devon won by 169 runs
2012	Cornwall	Buckinghamshire	Boscawen Park, Truro	Cornwall won by 150 runs
2013	Cheshire	Cambridgeshire	Harecroft Road, Wisbech	Cheshire won by 129 runs
2014	Wiltshire	Staffordshire	Salisbury and South Wiltshire Sports Club, Salisbury	Staffordshire won by 28 runs
2015	Oxfordshire	Cumberland	Edenside, Carlisle	Cumberland won by 10 wickets
2016	Berkshire	Lincolnshire	Sir Paul Getty's Ground, Wormsley	Berkshire won by 28 runs
2017	Berkshire	Lincolnshire	Banbury Cricket Club Ground, Bodicote	Berkshire won by 6 wickets
2018	Berkshire	Lincolnshire	Banbury Cricket Club Ground, Bodicote	Berkshire won by an innings and 32 runs
2019	Berkshire	Staffordshire	Banbury Cricket Club Ground, Bodicote	Berkshire won by 1 wicket
2020	Not contested, due to the COVID-19 pandemic			
2021	Oxfordshire	Suffolk	Tring Park Cricket Club Ground	Oxfordshire won by 178 runs
2022	Berkshire	Lincolnshire	West Bromwich Dartmouth Cricket Club Ground, West Bromwich	Berkshire won on first innings lead
2023	Devon	Buckinghamshire	West Bromwich Dartmouth Cricket Club Ground, West Bromwich	Buckinghamshire won by 550 runs
2024	Berkshire	Staffordshire	West Bromwich Dartmouth Cricket Club Ground, West Bromwich	Drawn (title shared)
2025	Devon	Buckinghamshire	West Bromwich Dartmouth Cricket Club Ground, West Bromwich	Buckinghamshire won by 19 runs
2026	Devon	Buckinghamshire	West Bromwich Dartmouth Cricket Club Ground, West Bromwich	Devon won by 122 runs

=== Performance by county ===
- **Bold** denotes the current 20 National Counties.

Club	Titles	National Counties Championship-winning seasons
**Staffordshire**	12 + 2 shared	1906, 1908, 1911, 1912 (shared), 1914, 1920, 1921, 1927, 1991, 1992, 1993, 1998, 2014, 2024 (shared)
**Buckinghamshire**	11 + 1 shared	1899 (shared), 1922, 1923, 1925, 1932, 1938, 1952, 1969, 1987, 2009, 2023, 2025
**Berkshire**	9 + 1 shared	1924, 1928, 1953, 2008, 2016, 2017, 2018, 2019, 2022, 2024 (shared)
**Devon**	8 + 1 shared	1978, 1994, 1995, 1996, 1997, 2004 (shared), 2006, 2011, 2026
Durham	7 + 2 shared	1895 (shared), 1900 (shared), 1901, 1926, 1930, 1976, 1980, 1981, 1984
Lancashire II	7	1907, 1934, 1937, 1948, 1949, 1960, 1964
**Cheshire**	5 + 2 shared	1967, 1985, 1988, 2001 (shared), 2005 (shared), 2007, 2013
Yorkshire II	6	1933, 1947, 1957, 1958, 1968, 1971
**Norfolk**	3 + 3 shared	1895 (shared), 1905, 1910, 1912 (shared), 1913, 2002 (shared)
**Oxfordshire**	5	1929, 1974, 1982, 1989, 2021
**Hertfordshire**	4	1936, 1975, 1983, 1990
Surrey II	4	1939, 1950, 1954, 1955
**Suffolk**	3 + 1 shared	1946, 1977, 1979, 2005 (shared)
Worcestershire	3 + 1 shared	1895 (shared), 1896, 1897, 1898
Northamptonshire	2 + 2 shared	1899 (shared), 1900 (shared), 1903, 1904
**Cumberland**	3	1986, 1999, 2015
**Bedfordshire**	2 + 1 shared	1970, 1972 2004 (shared)
**Lincolnshire**	2 + 1 shared	1966, 2001 (shared), 2003
**Dorset**	2	2000, 2010
Kent II	2	1951, 1956
Somerset II	2	1961, 1965
Warwickshire II	2	1959, 1962
**Wiltshire**	2	1902, 1909
**Cambridgeshire**	1	1963
**Cornwall**	1	2012
Leicestershire II	1	1931
Middlesex II	1	1935
**Shropshire**	1	1973
Glamorgan	0 + 1 shared	1900 (shared)
**Herefordshire**	0 + 1 shared	2002 (shared)
Carmarthenshire	0	
Denbighshire	0	
Derbyshire II	0	
Essex II	0	
Glamorgan II	0	
Gloucestershire II	0	
Hampshire II	0	
Monmouthshire	0	
Northamptonshire II	0	
**Northumberland**	0	
Nottinghamshire II	0	
Sussex II	0	
**Wales NCCC**	0	
Worcestershire II	0	
