= National Counties Trophy =

English domestic cricket competition

- Countries: England and Wales
- Administrator: England and Wales Cricket Board
- Format: Limited overs cricket
- First edition: 1983
- Number of teams: 20
- Current champion: Berkshire
- Most successful: Berkshire (9 titles)
- Website: MCCA Knockout Trophy

The National Counties Cricket Association Knockout Cup was started in 1983 as a knockout one-day competition for the National Counties in English cricket. At first it was known as the English Industrial Estates Cup, before being called the Minor Counties Knock Out Competition from 1986 to 1987, the Holt Cup from 1988 to 1992, the MCC Trophy from 1993 to 1998, the ECB 38-County Cup from 1999 to 2002 and the MCCA Knockout Trophy from 2003 to 2005. It was called the MCCA Trophy from 2006 and 2019 until the Minor Counties were rebranded as National Counties in 2020.

From 1998 to 2002, the competition was contested by 38 teams and included a group stage. The traditional National counties, plus Huntingdonshire and the "cricket boards" of the 18 first-class counties, as well as a Channel Islands team. The 2002 competition, which was won by the Warwickshire Cricket Board, remains the only time a non-National county has won the competition. This format was discontinued after 2002 and the competition is again a purely National Counties affair.

The most successful county is Berkshire who have won the title nine times. The current champions, Berkshire, defeated Cheshire in July 2026, winning their ninth trophy.

== List of winners ==
Year	Final			Final Venue
Year	Winner	Result	Runner-up	Final Venue
1983	Cheshire; 228/6 (50 overs)	Cheshire won by 36 runs	Bedfordshire; 192 all out (48.2 overs)	Macclesfield Cricket Club Ground, Macclesfield
1984	Hertfordshire; 107/7 (49.1 overs)	Hertfordshire won by 3 wickets	Norfolk; 106 all out (41.1 overs)	Fenner's, Cambridge
1985	Durham; 229/9 (55 overs)	Durham won by 100 runs	Dorset; 129 all out (47.2 overs)	Fenner's, Cambridge
1986	Norfolk; 223/8 (55 overs)	Norfolk won by 30 runs	Hertfordshire; 193 all out (50.4 overs)	Clarence Park, St Albans
1987	Cheshire; 132/2 (47.4 overs)	Cheshire won by 8 wickets	Cambridgeshire; 131 all out (49.5 overs)	Christ Church Ground, Oxford
1988	Dorset; 127/8 (49.2 overs)	Dorset won by 2 wickets	Cambridgeshire; 123/9 (50 overs)	Redlands Sports Ground, Weymouth
1989	Cumberland; 191/1 (39.1 overs)	Cumberland won by 9 wickets	Hertfordshire; 188/7 (55 overs)	Lord's, London
1990	Buckinghamshire; 227/7 (55 overs)	Buckinghamshire won by 16 runs	Lincolnshire; 211/9 (55 overs)	Lord's, London
1991	Staffordshire; 241/6 (54.5 overs)	Staffordshire won by 4 wickets	Devon; 239/8 (55 overs)	Lord's, London
1992	Devon; 221/6 (51.4 overs)	Devon won by 4 wickets	Staffordshire; 217/7 (55 overs)	Lord's, London
1993	Staffordshire; 326/7 (55 overs)	Staffordshire won by 69 runs	Wiltshire; 257/7 (55 overs)	Lord's, London
1994	Devon; 281/5 (55 overs)	Devon won by 18 runs	Lincolnshire; 263 all out (53.5 overs)	Lord's, London
1995	Cambridgeshire; 227/8 (54.3 overs)	Cambridgeshire won by 2 wickets	Herefordshire; 226/4 (55 overs)	Lord's, London
1996	Cheshire; 254/4 (54 overs)	Cheshire won by 6 wickets	Bedfordshire; 253/7 (55 overs)	Lord's, London
1997	Norfolk; 279/4 (55 overs)	Norfolk won by 52 runs	Shropshire; 227 all out (54.3 overs)	Lord's, London
1998	Devon; 204/2 (41.5 overs)	Devon won by 8 wickets	Shropshire; 201/9 (60 overs)	Lord's, London
1999	Bedfordshire; 154/2 (36.1 overs)	Bedfordshire won by 8 wickets	Cumberland; 153 all out (47.4 overs)	Lord's, London
2000	Herefordshire; 291/6 (50 overs)	Herefordshire won by 42 runs	Cheshire; 241/9 (50 overs)	Lord's, London
2001	Norfolk; 202/9 (50 overs)	Norfolk won by 114 runs	Devon; 88 all out (28.1 overs)	Lord's, London
2002	Warwickshire Cricket Board; 266/8 (49.1 overs)	Warwickshire Cricket Board won by 2 wickets	Devon; 261/8 (50 overs)	New Road, Worcester
2003	Cambridgeshire; 267/7 (47.5 overs)	Cambridgeshire won by 3 wickets	Shropshire; 266/9 (50 overs)	Lord's, London
2004	Berkshire; 240/3 (42.4 overs)	Berkshire won by 7 wickets	Northumberland; 237 all out (49.3 overs)	Lord's, London
2005	Norfolk; 135/4 (27 overs)	Norfolk won by 6 wickets	Wiltshire; 134 all out (45.1 overs)	Upton Court Road, Slough
2006	Northumberland; 209/2 (34.4 overs)	Northumberland won by 8 wickets	Dorset; 207/9 (50 overs)	Lord's, London
2007	Suffolk; 219 all out (49.2 overs)	Suffolk won by 35 runs	Cheshire; 184 all out (47.4 overs)	Lord's, London
2008	Devon; 290/4 (50 overs)	Devon won by 40 runs	Berkshire; 250 all out (48 overs)	Lord's, London
2009	Norfolk; 257/6 (50 overs)	Norfolk won by 104 runs	Staffordshire; 153 all out (40.3 overs)	Riverside Ground, Chester-le-Street
2010	Shropshire; 219 all out (49.2 overs)	Shropshire won by 7 wickets	Lincolnshire; 249/6 (50 overs)	Riverside Ground, Chester-le-Street
2011	Berkshire; 196/4 (34.2 overs)	Berkshire won by 6 wickets	Hertfordshire; 194/9 (36 overs)	Lord's, London
2012	Cumberland; 186/3 (32.4 overs)	Cumberland won by 7 wickets	Wiltshire; 184 all out (45.4 overs)	Wormsley Park, Ibstone
2013	Berkshire; 284/9 (50 overs)	Berkshire won by 128 runs	Shropshire; 156 all out (39.3 overs)	Wormsley Park, Ibstone
2014	Devon; 203/9 (50 overs)	Devon won by 7 runs	Oxfordshire; 196/9 (50)	Wormsley Park, Ibstone
2015	Cornwall; 203/3 (29.4 overs)	Cornwall won by 7 wickets	Northumberland; 199/9 (42)	Wormsley Park, Ibstone
2016	Herefordshire; 258/9 (50 overs)	Herefordshire won by 56 runs	Staffordshire; 202 all out (44.4 overs)	Wormsley Park, Ibstone
2017	Berkshire; 248/6 (40.3 overs)	Berkshire won by 4 wickets	Lincolnshire; 245/5 (50 overs)	Wormsley Park, Ibstone
2018	Cheshire; 248/7 (50 overs)	Cheshire won by 2 runs	Devon; 246/9 (50 overs)	Wormsley Park, Ibstone
2019	Berkshire; 144 all out (46.4 overs)	Berkshire won by 1 run	Cumberland; 143/9 (50 overs)	Wormsley Park, Ibstone
2021	Berkshire; 260/8 (50 overs)	Berkshire won by 151 runs	Cumbria; 109 (34.1 overs)	Wormsley Park, Ibstone
2022	Berkshire; 231/5 (38.5 overs)	Berkshire won by 5 wickets	Cumbria; 227/8 (50 overs)	Wormsley Park, Ibstone
2023	Berkshire; 195/8 (50 overs)	Berkshire won by 29 runs	Cumbria; 166 all out (45.3 overs)	Wormsley Park, Ibstone
2024	Norfolk; 258/4 (44.3 overs)	Norfolk won by six wickets	Cheshire; 257/8 (50 overs)	Wormsley Park, Ibstone
2025	Dorset; 198/5 (46.1 overs)	Dorset won by five wickets	Shropshire; 195 all out (49.1 overs)	Boughton Hall Cricket Club Ground, Chester
2026	Berkshire; 210 all out (46.4 overs)	Berkshire won by 112 runs	Cheshire; 98 all out (34.4 overs)	Copdock and Old Ipswichian Cricket Club Ground, Copdock

== Wins by county ==
- 9 wins: Berkshire
- 6 wins: Norfolk
- 5 wins: Devon
- 4 wins: Cheshire
- 2 wins: Staffordshire, Cambridgeshire, Cumberland, Herefordshire, Dorset
- 1 win: Hertfordshire, Durham, Buckinghamshire, Bedfordshire, Warwickshire Cricket Board, Northumberland, Suffolk, Shropshire, Cornwall

== See also ==
- National Counties Cricket Championship
- Friends Provident Trophy – the now defunct one-day tournament for first-class counties, which the Minor counties were once permitted to take part in
