= Chris Peploe =

English cricketer

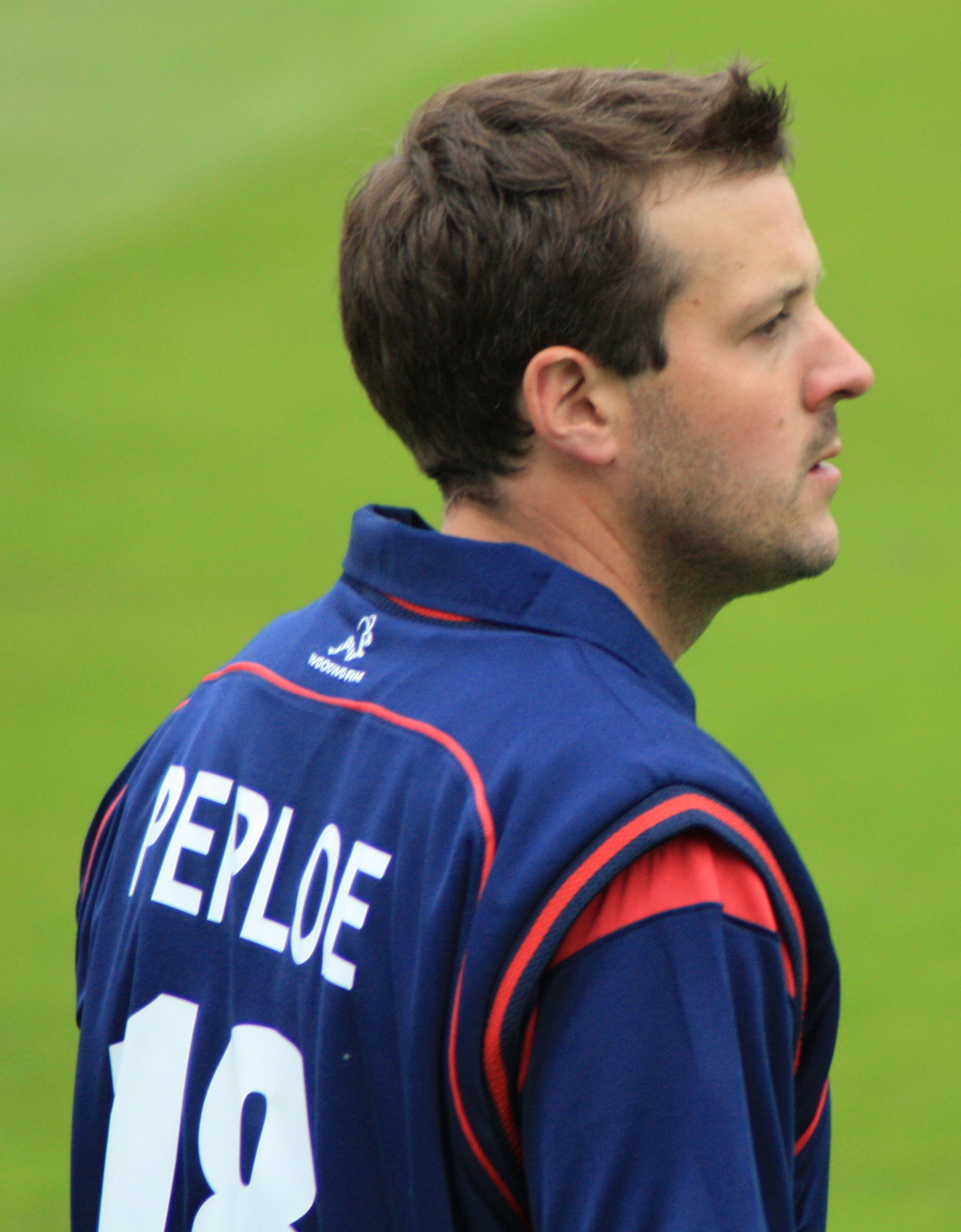

Personal information
- Full name: Christopher Thomas Peploe
- Born: 21 April 1981 (age 45); Hammersmith, London
- Nickname: Peps
- Batting: Left-handed
- Bowling: Slow left-arm orthodox

Domestic team information
- Years: Team
- 2001: Middlesex Cricket Board
- 2003–2008: Middlesex
- 2009–present: Berkshire
- 2010–2011: Unicorns (squad no. 18)

Career statistics
Competition	FC	LA	T20
Matches	30	26	15
Runs scored	530	58	12
Batting average	15.58	6.44	6.00
100s/50s	0/0	0/0	0/0
Top score	46	14*	7
Balls bowled	5,283	1,140	221
Wickets	56	31	10
Bowling average	50.69	26.35	37.80
5 wickets in innings	0	0	0
10 wickets in match	0	0	0
Best bowling	4/31	4/38	3/35
Catches/stumpings	11/–	10/–	4/–
- Source: Cricinfo, 3 November 2010

Christopher Thomas Peploe (born 26 April 1981) is an English cricketer who plays for Berkshire County Cricket Club. A left-handed batsman and a slow left-arm bowler, Peploe played at first-class cricket level for Middlesex.

Born in Hammersmith, he was an MCC Young Cricketer in 2002 and played for Middlesex between 2003 and 2008. His two finest hours with the bat being when he scored 42 against Sussex in 2005 and 46 against Lancashire in 2006. In total, he scored 530 first-class runs at an average of 15.58.

However, it was his bowling that led to him playing 26 County Championship games for Middlesex as well as 17 in the various forms of limited-overs cricket and 15 in the Twenty20 Cup.

The statistics would say his best performances came in limited-overs matches, in which he took 26 wickets at an average of 22.92 and strike rate of 31.38. He twice took four-wicket hauls in this form of the game, one of which came in front of the Sky cameras against Glamorgan in 2005.

He took one wicket every 22.1 balls, which is better than in the other two forms of cricket. His 3–35 against Kent at Uxbridge deserves mentioning.

His longest run in the team came in 2006, when he played 10 County Championship matches, 3 C&G Trophy matches, 6 Twenty20 Cup matches and 5 Natwest Pro40 matches. He was mainly kept out of the team by Jamie Dalrymple, who often played ahead of Peploe when it was decided to play only one spinner. However, the signing of Murali Kartik in 2007 pushed him further down the pecking order – Peploe only played three matches that year – while Shaun Udal made it three specialist spinners in 2008.

In 2005, he played seven first-class games, gaining 18 wickets.
