= Bodicote =

Village in Oxfordshire, England

Coordinates: 52.036°N 1.331°W

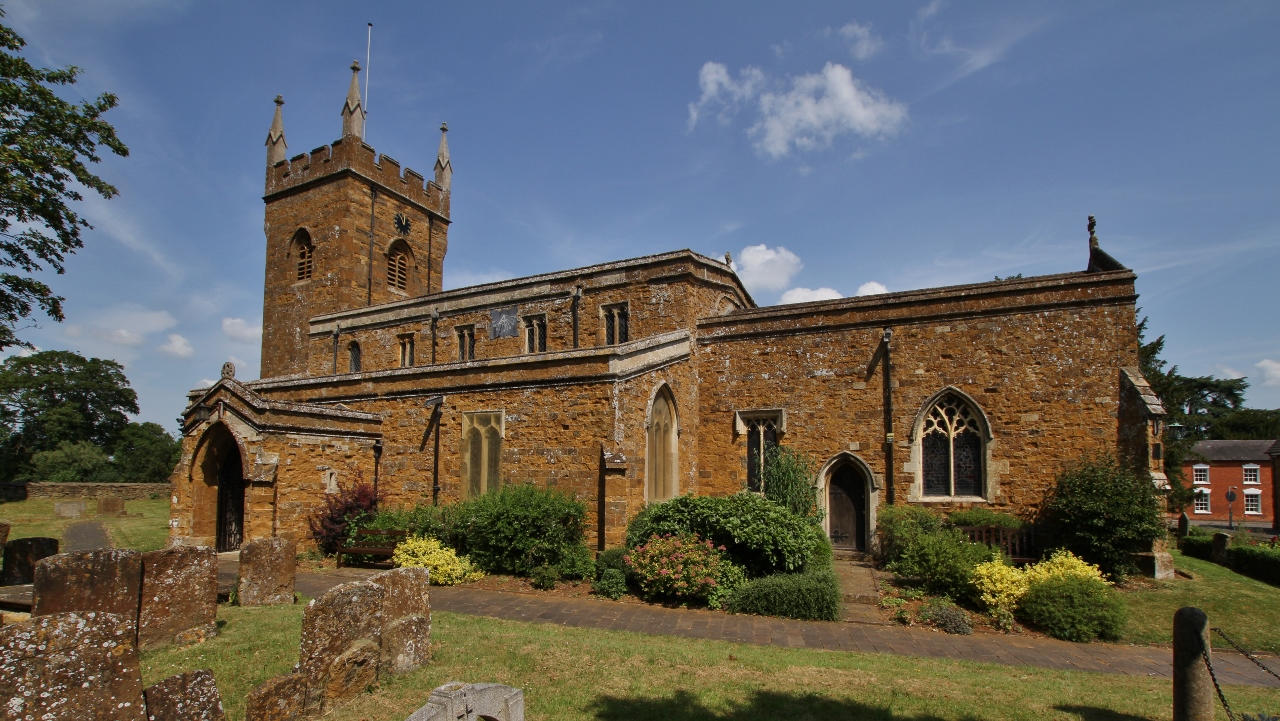
- St John the Baptist parish church

- Location within Oxfordshire
- Area: 4.33 km^{2} (1.67 sq mi)
- Population: 2,126 (2011 Census)
  - Density: 491/km^{2} (1,270/sq mi)
- OS grid reference: SP4637
- Civil parish: Bodicote
- District: Cherwell
- Shire county: Oxfordshire
- Region: South East
- Country: England
- Sovereign state: United Kingdom
- Post town: Banbury
- Postcode district: OX15
- Dialling code: 01295
- Police: Thames Valley
- Fire: Oxfordshire
- Ambulance: South Central
- UK Parliament: Banbury
- Website: Bodicote Parish Council

Bodicote is a village and civil parish in North Oxfordshire, approximately 2 miles (3 km) south of the centre of Banbury. The 2011 Census recorded the parish's population as 2,126. The Church of England parish church of Saint John the Baptist is a Grade II* listed building, with the chancel arch dating back to the 13th century.

== History ==
The Domesday Book of 1086 records a windmill that stood next to the grove at the top of Bodicote. Sor Brook, which forms the boundary between Adderbury and Bodicote parishes, has a watermill.

Bodicote was made a separate civil and Church of England parish in 1855, until which time it was part of the parish of nearby village Adderbury.

Bodicote House is a large Georgian house with a number of Victorian additions. Until 2025, Bodicote House was in use as the principal office for Cherwell District Council. In 2023 the council announced plans to move its headquarters into the Castle Quay shopping centre in Banbury and sell the Bodicote House site. The move, to 39 Castle Quay, took place on 31 March 2025.

== Churches ==
=== Church of England ===
The Church of England parish church of Saint John the Baptist was a chapel of ease of St Mary the Virgin, Adderbury until 1855.

The chancel arch is 13th-century. The building has north and south aisles linked to the nave by 14th century arcades of three bays each. There used to be a bell tower over the north aisle.

In 1844 the architects John Plowman and H.J. Underwood effected an almost complete rebuilding of St John's that included demolishing the old tower and replacing it with the current west tower. The tower has a ring of eight bells, all from the Whitechapel Bell Foundry. Thomas II Mears cast a ring of five bells (the present fourth, fifth, sixth, seventh and tenor bells) in 1843. The present treble, second and third bells were cast and hung in 1974, increasing the ring to eight. The tower has an iron-framed turret clock that was made by John Wise of London in 1700. The clock was renewed and modified in 1843, likely by Thomas Strange of Banbury.

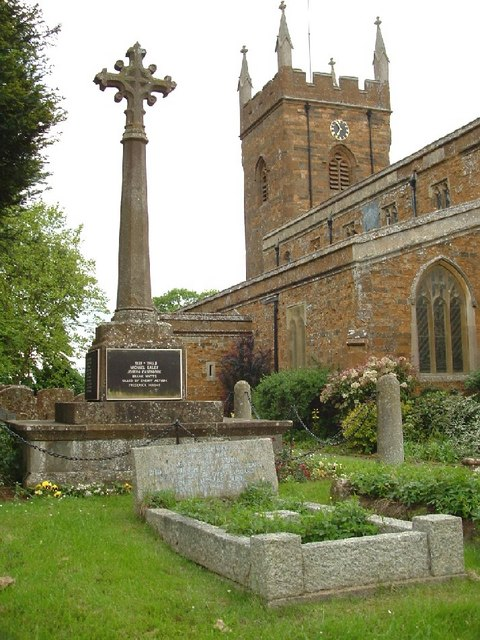
St John the Baptist Church, featuring the War Memorial in the churchyard.

The church is a Grade II* listed building.

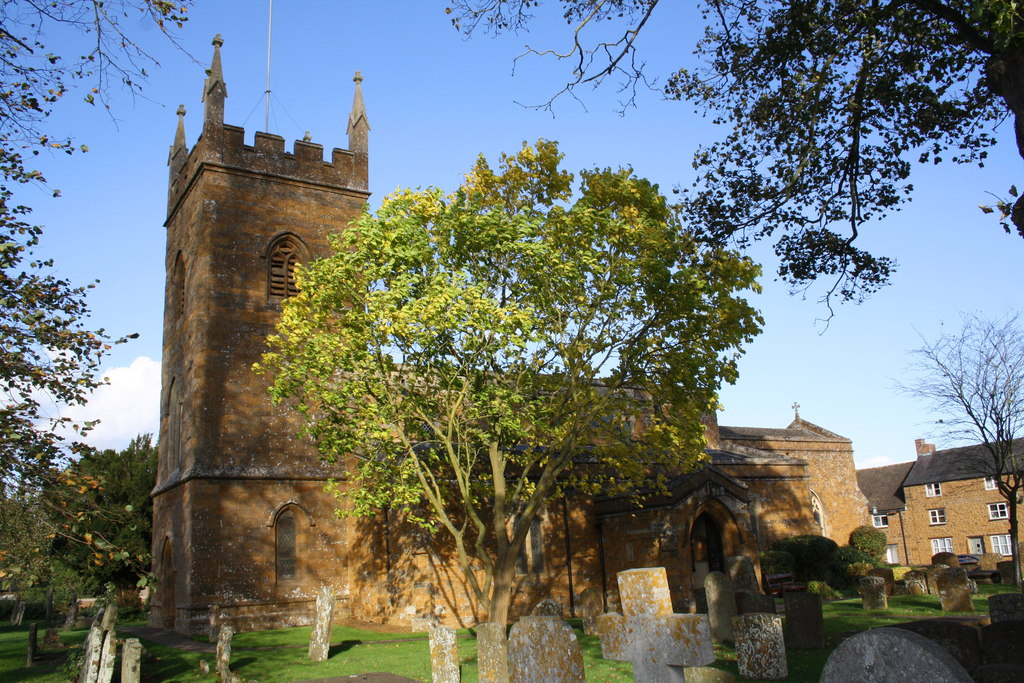
St John the Baptist Church.

=== Methodist ===
Bodicote Methodist church was built in 1845.

== Amenities ==
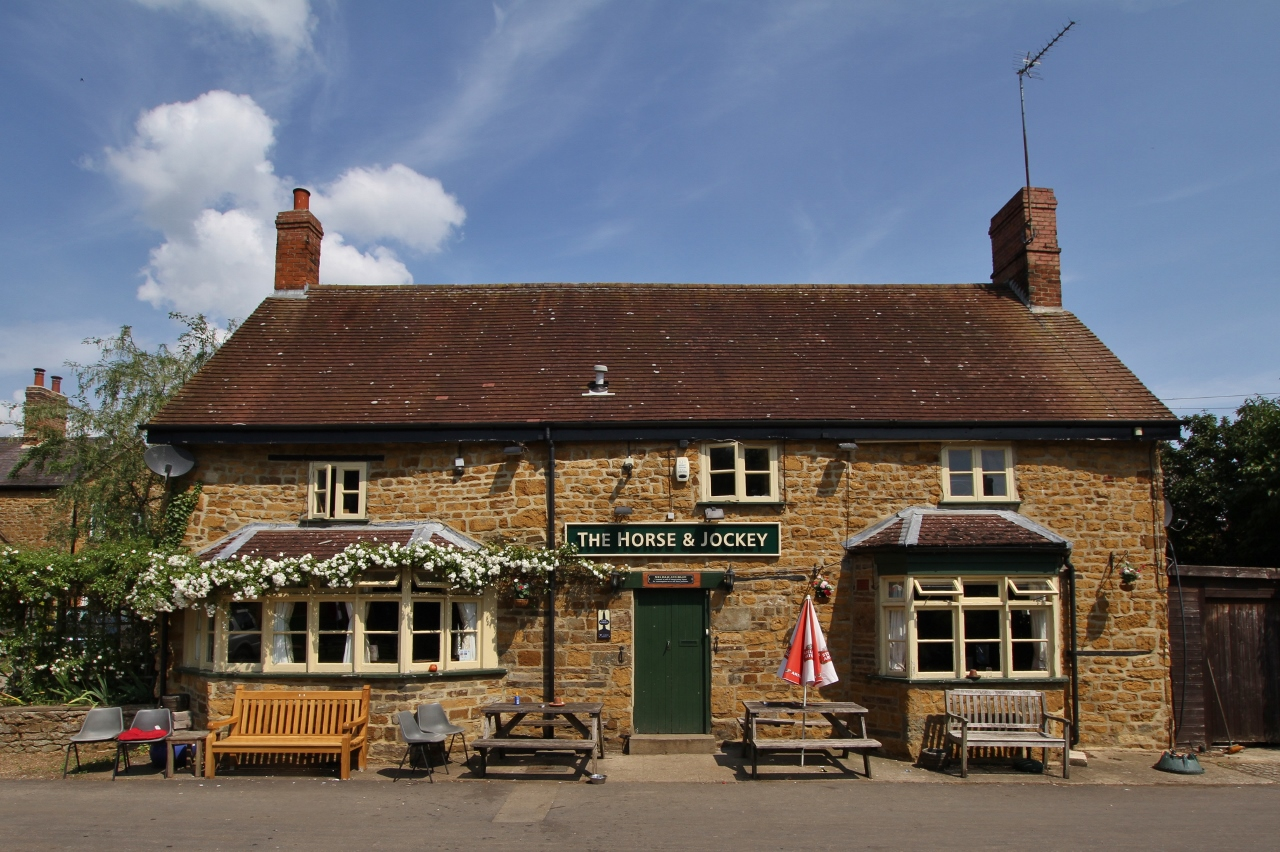
The Horse and Jockey pub, Bodicote.

Bodicote has a Church of England primary school, Bishop Loveday School.

The village has two pubs: the Horse and Jockey and the Plough. It has also the Spice Room Indian restaurant, which used to be the Baker's Arms pub. It was built in 1702 and latterly was controlled by Mitchells & Butlers brewery.

Bodicote has a convenience store, a Londis with sub-Post Office, in Molyneux Drive. There is a garden centre, Cotefield Nursery, with a café. There is also a hairdressing salon on the High Street. Playing fields and a cricket pavilion are located on White Post Road. Bodicote Cricket Club plays in the South Northants Cricket League.

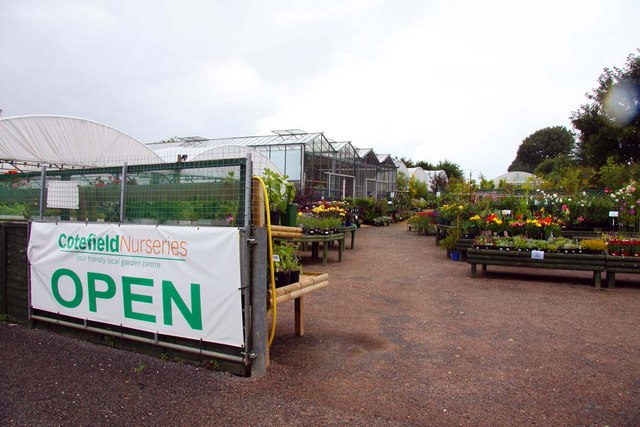
Cotefield Nursery, Bodicote.

The Bodfest Village Festival has been held by a group of volunteers annually since the year 2000, originally held on King's Field. The festival typically takes place in late July/early August and includes live bands, a pig roast and a barn dance. A plastic duck race and raffle are held each spring on the Sor Brook to raise funds for the festival.

A large firework display on King's Field is held annually on the fifth of November, to mark Guy Fawkes Night.

== Expansion ==
In the early 2000s the District Council's planning department put forward in its Local Plan plans to build the new Longford Park housing estate, east of Bodicote village and south of the Cherwell Heights housing estate of Banbury. In February 2006 Cherwell District Council approved the plans to meet a housing target despite a 20,000 signature petition against it. About 1,070 houses are being built along with local shops, a public house, church, restaurant, primary school and other local services. Currently in November 2022 there is only a Primary School and a Community Centre in the building originally earmarked for a doctors’ surgery.

== Public transport ==
Stagecoach in Oxfordshire bus route B3 runs half-hourly, Mondays to Saturdays, between Bodicote village and Hardwick Hill via Banbury town centre. There is no evening, Sunday or bank holiday service. Stagecoach in Oxfordshire route S4 serves the A4260 main road along the eastern edge of Bodicote village. It runs hourly, Mondays to Fridays, between Banbury and Oxford.

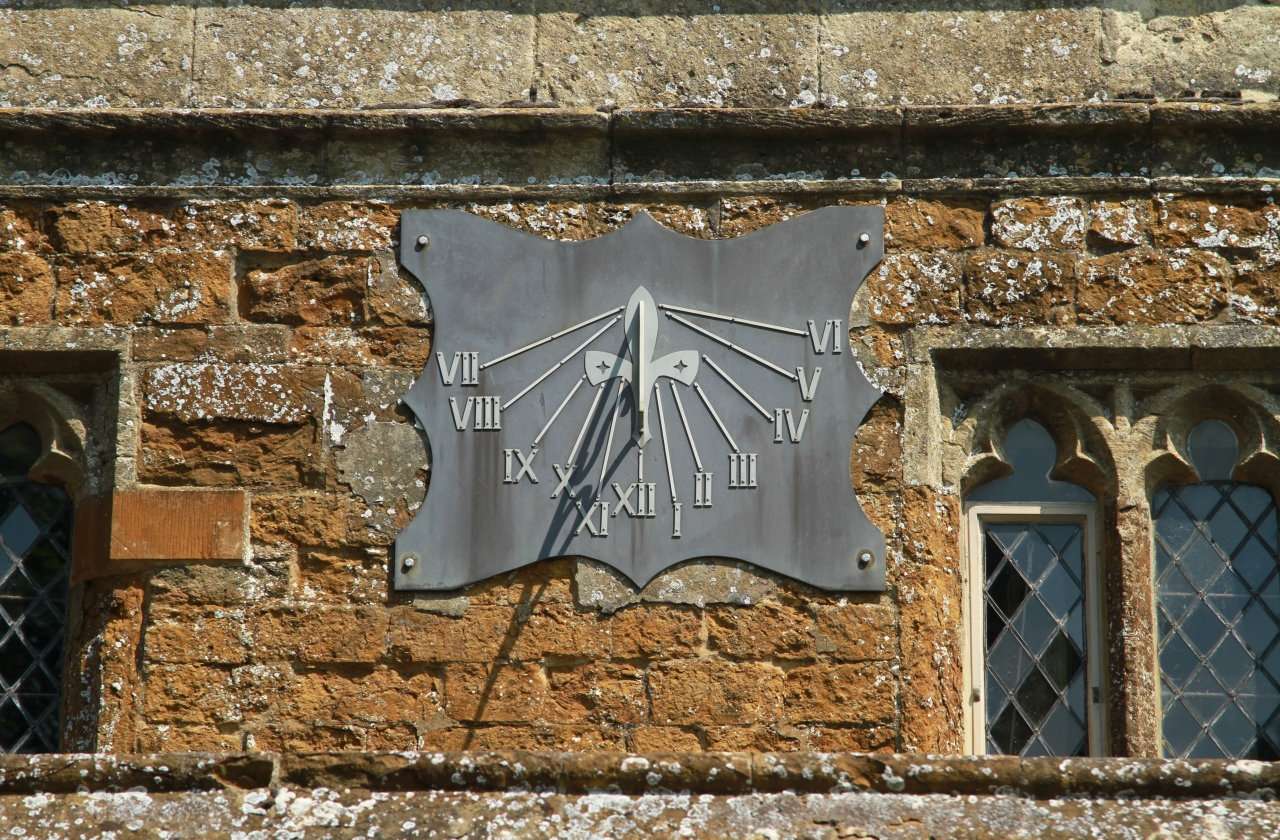
Sundial on the clerestory of the parish church of St John the Baptist

== Notable people ==
- Arthur Cobb (1864–1886), cricketer
- Diana Darvey, actress noted for The Benny Hill Show and Carry On Behind
- Peter Ginn, TV presenter and archaeologist
- James Johnson (bishop of St Helena) settled in Bodicote in retirement from full time church ministry.

== See also ==
- History of Banbury, Oxfordshire

== Sources ==
- Beeson, CFC (1989) [1962]. Simcock, AV (ed.). Clockmaking in Oxfordshire 1400–1850 (3rd ed.). Oxford: Museum of the History of Science. p. 32. ISBN 0-903364-06-9.
- Lobel, Mary D; Crossley, Alan, eds. (1969). "Adderbury". A History of the County of Oxford. Victoria County History. Vol. 9: Bloxham Hundred. London: Oxford University Press for the Institute of Historical Research. pp. 5–44. ISBN 978-0-19722-726-8.
- Sherwood, Jennifer; Pevsner, Nikolaus (1974). Oxfordshire. The Buildings of England. Harmondsworth: Penguin Books. p. 483. ISBN 0-14-071045-0.
