= West Bromwich Dartmouth Cricket Club =

West Bromwich Dartmouth Cricket Club is an amateur cricket club in West Bromwich, West Midlands, England. Founded in 1834 it is a founder member of the Birmingham & District Cricket league. Its First XI currently plays in the Premier Division Two of BDPCL. The Second XI in the First Division of the Staffordshire Clubs Cricket Championship, the Third XI play in the Second Division and the Fourth XI in the Sixth Division. The club has a women's team.

The unusual name "Dartmouth" comes from the original ground residing in the estate of the Earl of Dartmouth – Sandwell Hall. They now play their home games at Sandwell Park, West Bromwich (also within the Earl's old estate), next to Sandwell Park Golf Club and almost opposite The Hawthorns, home to football team, West Bromwich Albion. The Third and Fourth team play their home games at the Sandwell Academy Ground.

They were runners-up to fellow Birmingham League team Old Hill, in the 1993 national club knockout cup final.

== Birmingham & District Cricket league Honours ==
Premier Division Champions. 1st XI 1930 1932 1934 1941 1942 1943 1944 1945 1948 1953 1955 1958 1965 1971 1974 1993 2014 Joint Champions 1890 1933

Division One Champions. 1st XI 2003 2023

Premier Division Champions. 2nd XI 1905 1929 1963 1965 1970 1972 1973 1974 1998

Division One Champions. 2nd XI 2004

Challenge Cup Champions 1969 1970 1972 1989 1990 1992 1993 1994 1997

Top Performers for the club Top Run scorer is Kadeer Ali (7626), brother of England cricketer Moeen Ali Top wicket taker is Naheem Sajjad (300)

The stats can be accessed from ECB's play-cricket website at: https://westbromdart.play-cricket.com/home

== Facilities ==
There are three astro nets and two mobile nets available for cricket training. The club offers coaching for junior and senior levels by their ECB qualified coaches. The club offers parking facilities for West Bromwich Albion fans on matchdays.

== Photos ==
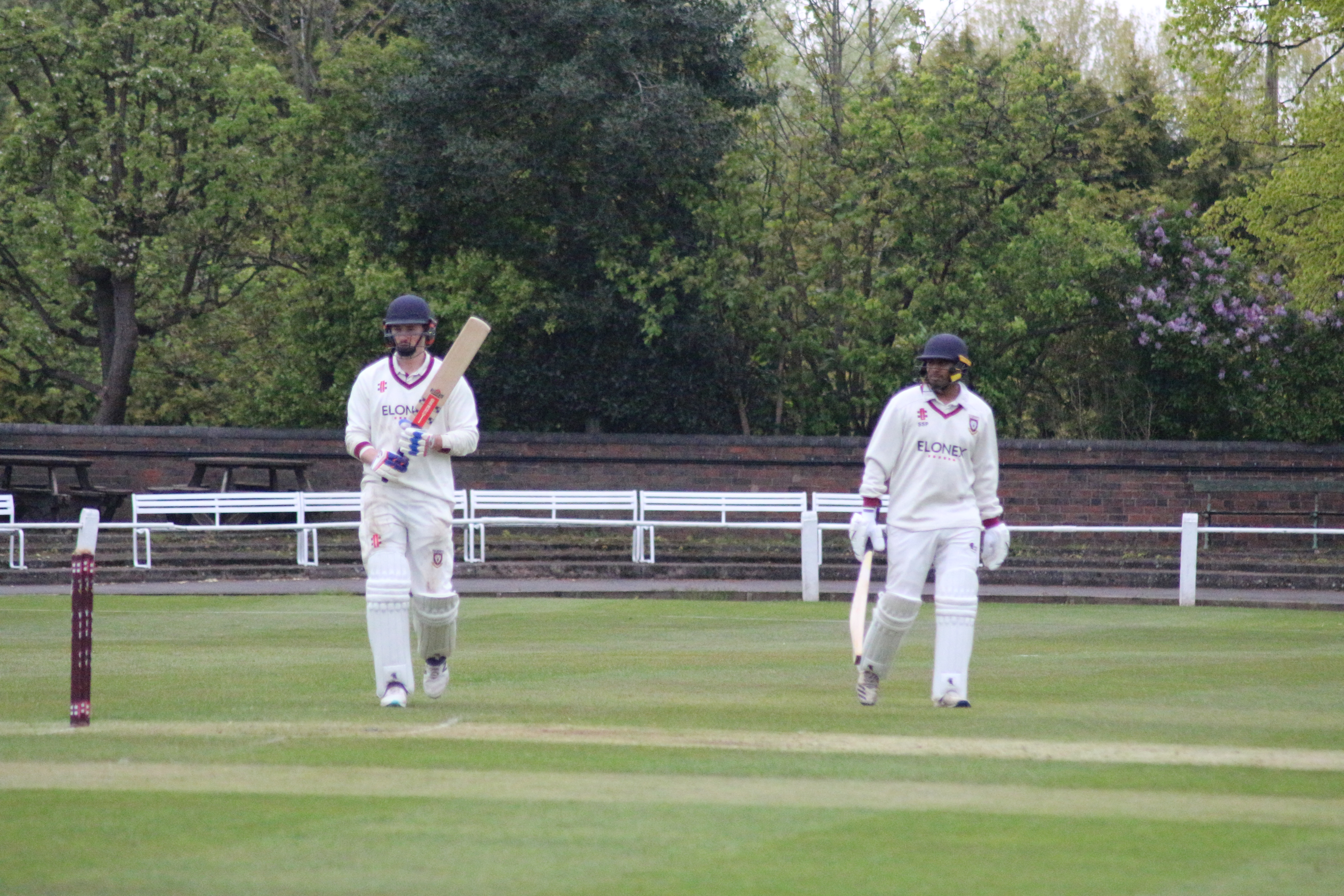
West Bromwich Dartmouth players starting their innings
