= Cumbria County Cricket Club =

English county cricket club

Team information
- Founded: 1948
- Home ground: Edenside Ground

History
- MCCC wins: 3
- MCCAT wins: 2
- FP Trophy wins: 0
- Official website: Cumbria County Cricket Club

Cumbria County Cricket Club (formerly Cumberland County Cricket Club) is one of twenty National Counties clubs within the domestic cricket structure of England and Wales. It represents the ceremonial county of Cumbria.

The team is currently a member of the National Counties Cricket Championship Eastern Division and plays in the NCCA Knockout Trophy. Cumbria played List A matches occasionally from 1984 until 2004 but is not classified as a List A team per se.

The club play at Carlisle (Edenside Ground), Workington and Penrith from Cumberland as well as Westmorland's former grounds in Kendal (Netherfield Cricket Club Ground) and Barrow-in-Furness, the latter originally Lancashire.

== Honours ==
- Minor Counties Championship (3) – 1986, 1999; 2015 shared (0) –
- MCCA Knockout Trophy (2) – 1989, 2012

== History ==
Cricket probably reached Cumberland and Westmorland during the 18th century. The earliest references to cricket in the region are in 1827 (Westmorland) and 1828 (Cumberland). According to Rowland Bowen's research, there was reportedly an informal county club in Westmorland about 1835. It is known that a county organisation was established on 2 January 1884.

The club formed on 10 April 1948 and has been renamed twice:

- Cumberland and Westmorland County Cricket Club
- Cumberland County Cricket Club: when it was admitted to the Minor Counties Championship for the 1955 season. As Cumberland it won the MCCA Knockout Trophy once in 1989 and the Minor Counties Championship three times, in 1986, 1999 and 2015
- Cumbria County Cricket Club: from 1 January 2021.

== Notable players ==
The following Cumberland cricketers also made an impact on the first-class game:

- Ian Austin
- Leonard Baichan
- David Lloyd
- Ashley Metcalfe
- Graham Monkhouse
- Gary Pratt
- Dean Hodgson
- Mike Burns

== Grounds ==
Cumbria CCC play in multiple grounds across Cumbria and its historic counties of Lancashire, Cumberland, Westmorland and West Riding of Yorkshire.
