= List of Oxford UCCE & MCCU players =

This is a list in alphabetical order of cricketers who have played first-class cricket for the Oxford University Centre of Cricketing Excellence (UCCE) and/or Oxford MCC University (MCCU).

The UCCE team first played cricket in 2000, and played its first first-class matches in 2001. Players attend either Oxford University or Oxford Brookes University. The UCCE team continued until the 2009 season, when the Marylebone Cricket Club (MCC) took over funding from the England and Wales Cricket Board (ECB), at which point it was renamed Oxford MCC University. MCC funding came to an end in July 2020, although no matches were played in the 2020 season due to restrictions in place during the COVID-19 pandemic. In December 2019 the ECB announced that matches with MCCU teams would lose their first-class status as of the 2021 season.

Players listed are those who have played first-class cricket for the team, in either the UCCE or the MCCU team. Some players will have played senior cricket for other teams, including for Oxford University Cricket Club (OUCC). That is a separate team which selects players only from Oxford University. Those who played only for OUCC are not included in this list.

As of 12 August 2020

== A ==
- Edward Abel
- Harry Adair
- Sam Agarwal
- Stuart Airey
- John Allen
- Omar Anwar

== B ==
- Alex Ball
- Mike Barnard
- Corne Bodenstein
- Andrew Bones
- Duncan Bradshaw
- Bruno Broughton (Note: Born at Lambeth in 1994, Boughton played three first-class matches for the MCCU team in 2016 and 2017, scoring 86 runs. Educated at Cranleigh School, he also played Second XI Championship matches for the MCC Universities team between 2015 and 2017.)
- Graham Butcher

== C ==
- Philip Clark
- Paul Clinton
- Freddie Coleman
- Dan Conway
- Richard Coughtrie
- Ed Cowan

== D ==
- Jamie Dalrymple
- Tim Daniels
- Jasper Davies
- Stewart Davison
- Calvin Dickinson
- Charlie Duffell

== E ==
- Edward Ellis
- Charlie Ellison

== F ==
- Tom Fell
- Nicholas Ferraby
- Josh Fleming
- Matt Floyd
- Daniel Fox

== G ==
- Jamie Gnodde
- Alan Gofton
- Donald Gordon
- Steven Green
- Jack Grundy

== H ==
- Calvin Harrison
- Hassam Mushtaq
- Stephen Hawinkels
- Tom Heathfield
- Tom Hicks
- Ian Hilsum
- Harry Hooper
- Will Howard
- Henry Hughes
- Reece Hussain
- Oliver Hutton

== J ==
- Aaron Jeavons
- Ben Jeffery
- Freddie John
- Huw Jones
- Owain Jones

== K ==
- Ben Kemp
- Faisal Khalid
- Salman Khan
- Matthew Kidd
- Josh Knappett
- Neil Kruger

== L ==
- Matthew Laidman
- Malcolm Lake
- Steve Leach
- Robin Lett
- Mark Lewis
- Tim Linley
- Stephen Lowe

== M ==
- James Macadam
- Wilfred Marriott
- Jonathan Marsden
- Alex Martin
- Jak Martin
- Christopher McBride
- Jack McIver
- Paul McMahon
- Tom Mees
- Shamilal Mendis
- Neil Millar
- Marc Milligan
- Stephen Moreton
- Charlie Morris
- Edward Morse
- Morteza Ali
- Will Mottram
- Michael Munday

== O ==
- Salil Oberoi

== P ==
- Luke Parker
- Dan Pascoe
- Lloyd Paternott
- Karl Penhale
- Toby Pettman
- Joe Porter
- James Poulson

== R ==
- Alex Rackow
- James Redmayne
- Mali Richards
- Mohammed Rizvi
- William Robertson
- Luke Ryan

== S ==
- Lloyd Sabin
- Oliver Sadler
- Abidine Sakande
- Chris Sandbach
- Pranay Sanklecha
- Joe Sayers
- Alex Scott
- David Scott
- Chris Searle
- James Seward
- Rajiv Sharma
- Toby Sharpe
- Louie Shaw
- David Smith
- Benjamin Stebbings
- Jonty Strachan
- Amit Suman
- Chris Swainland

== T ==
- Matthew Taylor
- Jamie Thompson

== W ==
- Charlie Walker
- Charlie Warren
- Simon Watkins
- Matt Watson
- Luke Webb
- Sam Weller
- Daniel Wells
- Alex Wilkinson
- Ben Williams
- Peter Wilshaw
- Matt Winter
- Nicholas Woods
- Alex Wyatt

== Y ==
- Ed Young
- Peter Young

== Z ==
- Zaman Akhter
