= Glamorgan County Cricket Club in 2012 =

Welsh cricket club season

Glamorgan County Cricket Club
2012 season
- Coach: (Australia) Matthew Mott
- Captain: (Wales) Mark Wallace (Australia) Jim Allenby (Twenty20 Cup)
- Overseas player: (Australia) Moises Henriques (until 5 May) (Australia) Marcus North (from 13 May) (Australia) Shaun Marsh (Twenty20 Cup)
- Ground(s): Sophia Gardens, Cardiff; St Helen's, Swansea; Penrhyn Avenue, Rhos-on-Sea
- County Championship: 6th, Division Two
- Pro40: 6th, Group B
- Twenty20 Cup: 5th, Mid/Wales/West
- Most runs: FC: Stewart Walters (813); LA: Chris Cooke (249); T20: Shaun Marsh (209)
- Most wickets: FC: Jim Allenby (42); LA: Simon Jones (13); T20: Simon Jones (7)
- Most catches: FC: Stewart Walters (13); LA: Marcus North (5); T20: Stewart Walters (4)
- Most wicket-keeping dismissals: FC: Mark Wallace (42 ct + 4 st); LA: Mark Wallace (8 ct + 2 st); T20: Mark Wallace (5 ct + 1 st)

The 2012 season was Glamorgan County Cricket Club's 125th year in existence and their 92nd as a first-class cricket county. They played most of their home matches at Sophia Gardens in Cardiff, but also used outgrounds in Swansea (St Helen's) and Rhos-on-Sea (Penrhyn Avenue). They finished sixth in Division Two of the County Championship, as well as sixth in Group B of the ECB40 and fifth in the Mid/Wales/West Group of the Twenty20 Cup, missing out on the knockout stage of both competitions. In the limited-overs formats, the team rebranded as "Welsh Dragons" in an effort to reinforce the club's status as the representative of the whole of Wales in county cricket.

The team was coached by Matthew Mott for a second year, albeit in a new role as head of elite performance. Wicketkeeper-batsman Mark Wallace served as captain in the County Championship and the ECB40, while Jim Allenby led the team in the Twenty20 Cup. The team signed Australian batsman Marcus North as their overseas player for the 2012 season, but because he was unavailable for the first month of the season due to the birth of his second child, Glamorgan also brought in fellow Australian Moises Henriques to play in the first few games. After initially approaching Australia bowler Mitchell Johnson for the Twenty20 Cup, the team also signed another Australian, Shaun Marsh. Other signings included the return of England seam bowler Simon Jones after a brief return on loan in 2011, although he was predominantly used as a white-ball player. South Africa-born batsman Martin van Jaarsveld was also brought in as a Kolpak player, initially just for the Twenty20 Cup, although he did end up playing in two ECB40 matches. South African opener Alviro Petersen did not return for the 2012 season after captaining Glamorgan in 2011, and Mike Powell also left after 15 years with the club, signing for Kent after being released by Glamorgan at the end of the previous season.

The season was marred by the death of 23-year-old former Glamorgan player Tom Maynard, whose father Matthew was also a former Glamorgan player and coach. Maynard's body was found on the tracks at Wimbledon Park tube station after being hit by a train on the morning of 18 June 2012, having fled on foot after being pulled over by police for driving erratically earlier in the night. Glamorgan rearranged their T20 game against Worcestershire from 20 June to 3 July, before Maynard's funeral at Llandaff Cathedral on 4 July.

== Squad ==
- No. denotes the player's squad number, as worn on the back of their shirt.
- ‡ denotes players with international caps.
- * denotes a player who has been awarded a county cap.
- Ages given as of the first day of the County Championship season, 5 April 2012.

No.	Name	Nationality	Birth date	Batting style	Bowling style	Notes
Batsmen
	Will Bragg	Wales	24 October 1986 (aged 25)	Left-handed	—	Occasional wicket-keeper
	Shaun Marsh‡	Australia	9 July 1983 (aged 28)	Left-handed	Slow left-arm orthodox	Overseas player (T20 only)
	Marcus North‡	Australia	28 July 1979 (aged 32)	Left-handed	Right arm off break	Overseas player
	Gareth Rees*	Wales	8 April 1985 (aged 26)	Left-handed	Left arm medium	
	Martin van Jaarsveld‡	South Africa	18 July 1974 (aged 37)	Right-handed	Right arm medium/off break	Kolpak registration
	Stewart Walters	Australia	25 June 1983 (aged 28)	Right-handed	Right arm leg break	
	Ben Wright*	England	5 December 1987 (aged 24)	Right-handed	Right arm medium-fast	
All-rounders
	Jim Allenby*	Australia	12 September 1982 (aged 29)	Right-handed	Right arm medium	T20 captain
	James Harris*	Wales	16 May 1990 (aged 21)	Right-handed	Right arm medium-fast	
	Moises Henriques‡	Australia	1 February 1987 (aged 25)	Right-handed	Right arm fast-medium	Overseas player
	Nick James	England	17 September 1986 (aged 25)	Left-handed	Slow left-arm orthodox	
	Graham Wagg	England	28 April 1983 (aged 28)	Right-handed	Left arm medium	
Wicket-keepers
	Chris Cooke	South Africa	30 May 1986 (aged 25)	Right-handed	Right arm slow-medium	
	Mark Wallace*	Wales	19 November 1981 (aged 30)	Left-handed	—	Club captain
Bowlers
	Chris Ashling	England	26 November 1988 (aged 23)	Right-handed	Right arm medium-fast	
	Dean Cosker*	England	7 January 1978 (aged 34)	Right-handed	Slow left-arm orthodox	
	Robert Croft*‡	Wales/England	25 May 1970 (aged 41)	Right-handed	Right arm off break	
	John Glover	Wales	29 August 1989 (aged 22)	Right-handed	Right arm medium-fast	
	Simon Jones*‡	Wales/England	29 August 1989 (aged 22)	Right-handed	Right arm medium-fast	
	Aneurin Norman	Wales	22 March 1991 (aged 21)	Right-handed	Right arm medium	
	Mike O'Shea	Wales	4 September 1987 (aged 24)	Right-handed	Right arm medium-fast	
	Will Owen	Wales	2 September 1988 (aged 23)	Right-handed	Right arm medium-fast	
	Michael Reed	England	10 September 1988 (aged 23)	Right-handed	Right arm fast-medium	
	Andrew Salter	Wales	1 June 1993 (aged 18)	Right-handed	Right arm off break	
	Huw Waters*	Wales	26 September 1986 (aged 25)	Right-handed	Right arm medium	

== County Championship ==
=== Table ===
Pos	Team	Pld	W	L	T	D	A	Bat	Bowl	Ded	Pts
1	Durham	16	6	2	0	8	0	31	43	0	234
2	Yorkshire	16	5	0	0	11	0	41	40	0	249
3	Kent	16	4	3	0	9	0	39	40	0	215
4	Hampshire	16	4	5	0	7	0	28	40	0	188
5	Essex	16	3	3	0	10	0	27	40	0	195
6	Glamorgan	16	3	6	0	6	1	28	35	1	166
7	Leicestershire	16	3	3	0	10	0	24	33	5	180
8	Northamptonshire	16	2	5	0	9	0	37	34	0	175
9	Gloucestershire	16	3	6	0	6	1	22	35	0	161

Source: ESPNcricinfo

=== Matches ===
==== Leicestershire v Glamorgan (5–8 April) ====
5–8 April
Scorecard

Leicestershire	v	Glamorgan
249 (83.1 overs); Claude Henderson 57* (119); Huw Waters 4/57 (19 overs)		124 (36.1 overs); Graham Wagg 42 (60); Robbie Joseph 6/47 (14.1 overs)
110 (42.4 overs); Jacques du Toit 40 (67); Moises Henriques 3/25 (11 overs)		183 (47.2 overs); Mark Wallace 47 (48); Robbie Joseph 6/64 (16 overs)

Leicestershire won by 52 runs
Grace Road, Leicester
Umpires: Peter Willey and Steve Garratt

- Glamorgan won the toss and elected to field.
- Points: Leicestershire 15, Glamorgan 2.
- Glamorgan docked 1 point for a slow over rate.
- Leicestershire docked 5 points for a slow over rate.

==== Glamorgan v Derbyshire (12–15 April) ====
12–15 April
Scorecard

Derbyshire	v	Glamorgan
130 (50 overs); Ross Whiteley 28 (82); Graham Wagg 6/44 (18 overs)		95 (36.1 overs); Moises Henriques 16 (41); Jonathan Clare 5/17 (8 overs)
197 (82.5 overs); David Wainwright 51* (165); Moises Henriques 4/54 (24 overs)		102 (31.3 overs); Gareth Rees 41 (51); Jonathan Clare 6/40 (12.3 overs)

Derbyshire won by 130 runs
Sophia Gardens, Cardiff
Umpires: Mark Benson and Tim Robinson

- Derbyshire won the toss and elected to bat.
- Mike Reed (Glam) made his first-class debut.
- Points: Derbyshire 19, Glamorgan 3.

==== Glamorgan v Hampshire (19–22 April) ====
19–22 April
Scorecard

Glamorgan	v	Hampshire
103/9d (42.3 overs); Will Bragg 45 (92); David Balcombe 5/33 (14 overs)		156 (55.3 overs); Liam Dawson 32 (57); Huw Waters 7/53 (18.3 overs)
256 (79.3 overs); Ben Wright 104 (157); Hamza Riazuddin 5/61 (18 overs)		204/8 (45.5 overs); Sean Ervine 75 (92); Graham Wagg 3/43 (13 overs)

Hampshire won by 2 wickets
Sophia Gardens, Cardiff
Umpires: George Sharp and Nick Cook

- Glamorgan won the toss and elected to bat.
- Points: Hampshire 19, Glamorgan 3.

==== Gloucestershire v Glamorgan (26–29 April) ====
26–29 April
Scorecard

Gloucestershire	v	Glamorgan

Match abandoned without a ball bowled
County Ground, Bristol
Umpires: Ismail Dawood and Richard Illingworth

- No toss.
- No play was possible on days 1, 2, 3 or 4.
- Points: Gloucestershire 3, Glamorgan 3.

==== Glamorgan v Essex (2–5 May) ====
2–5 May
Scorecard

Essex	v	Glamorgan
259/9d (91 overs); Alviro Petersen 145 (223); Graham Wagg 4/61 (21 overs)		187 (66 overs); Stewart Walters 69 (104); Tymal Mills 4/25 (9 overs)
166/9d (46 overs); Tom Westley 52 (81); Huw Waters 5/47 (16 overs)		99/5 (42 overs); Gareth Rees 33 (102); Charl Willoughby 4/33 (14 overs)

Match drawn
Sophia Gardens, Cardiff
Umpires: Jeff Evans and Peter Hartley

- Glamorgan won the toss and elected to field.
- No play was possible on day 2.
- Points: Essex 8, Glamorgan 6.

==== Derbyshire v Glamorgan (16–19 May) ====
16–19 May
Scorecard

Glamorgan	v	Derbyshire
236 (86 overs); Marcus North 79 (180); Tim Groenewald 3/34 (22 overs)		355 (103.5 overs); Martin Guptill 132 (189); Marcus North 3/40 (14 overs)
188 (67.2 overs); Will Bragg 78 (126); David Wainwright 5/51 (19.2 overs)		71/2 (12.3 overs); Martin Guptill 30 (23); Mike Reed 2/25 (6 overs)

Derbyshire won by 8 wickets
County Cricket Ground, Derby
Umpires: Nigel Llong and Steve O'Shaughnessy

- Glamorgan won the toss and elected to bat.
- Points: Derbyshire 23, Glamorgan 4.

==== Hampshire v Glamorgan (23–26 May) ====
23–26 May
Scorecard

Hampshire	v	Glamorgan
316 (86.4 overs); Sean Ervine 109* (149); John Glover 4/76 (18.4 overs)		327 (92.2 overs); Will Bragg 73 (128); David Balcombe 4/91 (23 overs)
273 (86.2 overs); Jimmy Adams 72 (157); John Glover 3/45 (20 overs)		231 (74.3 overs); Marcus North 69 (102); Kabir Ali 3/42 (15.3 overs)

Hampshire won by 31 runs
Rose Bowl, Southampton
Umpires: Mark Eggleston and Richard Illingworth

- Glamorgan won the toss and elected to field.
- Points: Hampshire 22, Glamorgan 6.

==== Glamorgan v Leicestershire (29 May – 1 June) ====
29 May – 1 June
Scorecard

Leicestershire	v	Glamorgan
271 (118.5 overs); Michael Thornely 97 (267); Jim Allenby 4/39 (22 overs)		558/9d (129 overs); Mark Wallace 118 (150); Wayne White 4/98 (24 overs)
316/2d (117 overs); Ned Eckersley 137* (307); Jim Allenby 1/15 (14 overs)

Match drawn
Sophia Gardens, Cardiff
Umpires: Graham Lloyd and Richard Illingworth

- Leicestershire won the toss and elected to bat.
- Points: Glamorgan 10, Leicestershire 6.

==== Glamorgan v Yorkshire (6–9 June) ====
6–9 June
Scorecard

Glamorgan	v	Yorkshire
117/3 (34 overs); Stewart Walters 37* (44); Mitchell Starc 2/39 (8 overs)

Match drawn
Penrhyn Avenue, Rhos-on-Sea
Umpires: Mark Benson and Paul Baldwin

- Glamorgan won the toss and elected to bat.
- Play on day 1 was reduced to 34 overs.
- No play was possible on day 2, 3 or 4.
- Points: Yorkshire 4, Glamorgan 3.

==== Northamptonshire v Glamorgan (14–17 July) ====
14–17 July
Scorecard

Northamptonshire	v	Glamorgan
350/5d (100 overs); David Sales 138* (285); John Glover 2/51 (15 overs)		forfeit
forfeit		351/7 (89.1 overs); Marcus North 73 (126); David Willey 2/103 (26 overs)

Glamorgan won by 3 wickets
County Ground, Northampton
Umpires: Mark Benson and Nick Cook

- Glamorgan won the toss and elected to field.
- No play was possible on day 1 or 3.
- Points: Glamorgan 17, Northamptonshire 4.

==== Kent v Glamorgan (19–22 July) ====
19–22 July
Scorecard

Kent	v	Glamorgan
456/9d (119 overs); Darren Stevens 123 (152); James Harris 5/118 (33 overs)		389 (112.1 overs); Mark Wallace 111 (197); Darren Stevens 4/77 (26.1 overs)
168/2d (50.1 overs); Sam Northeast 101* (159); John Glover 2/16 (9 overs)

Match drawn
St Lawrence Ground, Canterbury
Umpires: David Millns and Stephen Gale

- Kent won the toss and elected to bat.
- Points: Kent 11, Glamorgan 9.

==== Glamorgan v Gloucestershire (1–4 August) ====
1–4 August
Scorecard

Glamorgan	v	Gloucestershire
208 (67.5 overs); Dean Cosker 49* (61); Rob Nicol 4/53 (12.5 overs)		165 (90.1 overs); Ian Cockbain 38 (176); Robert Croft 4/51 (29.1 overs)
204/7d (50 overs); Stewart Walters 56 (72); Ian Saxelby 3/77 (16 overs)		221 (61.5 overs); Jack Taylor 63 (45); Robert Croft 4/53 (13.5 overs)

Glamorgan won by 26 runs
St Helen's, Swansea
Umpires: Jeremy Lloyds and Tim Robinson

- Glamorgan won the toss and elected to bat.
- Points: Glamorgan 20, Gloucestershire 3.

==== Essex v Glamorgan (15–18 August) ====
15–18 August
Scorecard

Glamorgan	v	Essex
438 (115.3 overs); Stewart Walters 159 (257); Harbhajan Singh 4/91 (35 overs)		520/9d (130.5 overs); Tom Westley 185 (334); Robert Croft 5/135 (30.5 overs)
260/6 (82 overs); Jim Allenby 103* (163); Harbhajan Singh 3/62 (30 overs)

Match drawn
Castle Park Cricket Ground, Colchester
Umpires: Mark Benson and Martin Saggers

- Glamorgan won the toss and elected to bat.
- Points: Essex 10, Glamorgan 9.

==== Glamorgan v Northamptonshire (28–31 August) ====
28–31 August
Scorecard

Northamptonshire	v	Glamorgan
432/8d (170 overs); Niall O'Brien 182 (462); Marcus North 2/57 (24 overs)		302/5d (100.5 overs); Stewart Walters 98 (227); Andrew Hall 2/32 (15.5 overs)

Match drawn
Sophia Gardens, Cardiff
Umpires: Neil Mallender and Steve Garratt

- Northamptonshire won the toss and elected to bat.
- No play was possible on day 2.
- Rob Keogh (Northants) made his first-class debut.
- Points: Glamorgan 8, Northamptonshire 6.

==== Yorkshire v Glamorgan (4–7 September) ====
4–7 September
Scorecard

Glamorgan	v	Yorkshire
272 (87.2 overs); Will Bragg 92 (134); Steven Patterson 4/49 (19.2 overs)		344 (88.4 overs); Adam Lyth 95 (138); Jim Allenby 4/61 (18 overs)
182 (58.1 overs); Jim Allenby 48 (64); Steven Patterson 4/47 (21 overs)		111/2 (28.1 overs); Adam Lyth 50 (60); Dean Cosker 1/26 (6 overs)

Yorkshire won by 8 wickets
Headingley, Leeds
Umpires: Neil Bainton and Trevor Jesty

- Yorkshire won the toss and elected to field.
- David Lloyd (Glam) made his first-class debut.
- Points: Yorkshire 22, Glamorgan 5.

==== Glamorgan v Kent (11–14 September) ====
11–14 September
Scorecard

Glamorgan	v	Kent
390 (112.3 overs); Jim Allenby 125* (163); Matt Coles 4/76 (18.3 overs)		170 (53.5 overs); Sam Northeast 62 (132); Robert Croft 5/31 (11.5 overs)
61/3 (14.2 overs); Will Bragg 25 (27); Matt Coles 2/28 (7 overs)		280 (f/o) (83.4 overs); Geraint Jones 81 (148); John Glover 3/43 (14 overs)

Glamorgan won by 7 wickets
Sophia Gardens, Cardiff
Umpires: Steve Garratt and Trevor Jesty

- Kent won the toss and elected to field.
- Points: Glamorgan 23, Kent 3.

== One-Day Cup ==
=== Standings ===
Pos	Team	Pld	W	L	T	NR	Pts	NRR
1	Hampshire Royals	12	7	3	0	2	16	0.754
2	Surrey Lions	12	6	3	0	3	15	0.466
3	Somerset	12	6	4	0	2	14	0.385
4	Nottinghamshire Outlaws	12	6	5	0	1	13	0.101
5	Durham Dynamos	12	5	5	0	2	12	0.262
6	Welsh Dragons	12	3	6	0	3	9	−0.971
7	Scottish Saltires	12	1	8	0	3	5	−1.359

Source: ESPNcricinfo

Advanced to the semi-finals

=== Matches ===
==== Hampshire v Glamorgan (7 May) ====
7 May
Scorecard

Glamorgan; 173/7 (34 overs)	v	Hampshire; 151/2 (23.5 overs)
Stewart Walters 68 (89); Kabir Ali 3/44 (7 overs)		James Vince 83 (78); Will Owen 1/15 (3.5 overs)

Hampshire won by 48 runs (D/L method)
Rose Bowl, Southampton
Umpires: Alex Wharf and Nick Cook

- Glamorgan won the toss and elected to bat.
- Rain reduced the Glamorgan innings to 34 overs
- Sean Terry (Hants) made his List A debut.
- Points: Hampshire 2, Glamorgan 0.

==== Scotland v Glamorgan (13 May) ====
13 May
Scorecard

Scotland; 25/1 (6.5 overs)	v	Glamorgan
Ryan Flannigan 17* (19); Simon Jones 1/14 (3 overs)

No result
Bothwell Castle, Uddingston
Umpires: Nigel Cowley and Stephen Gale

- Glamorgan won the toss and elected to field.
- Rain stopped play after 6.5 overs of the Scotland innings.
- Points: Scotland 1, Glamorgan 1.

==== Glamorgan v Surrey (2 June) ====
2 June
Scorecard

Surrey; 173/9 (40 overs)	v	Glamorgan; 107/9 (26 overs)
Steven Davies 58 (48); John Glover 3/53 (8 overs)		Jim Allenby 28 (32); Murali Kartik 4/27 (6 overs)

Surrey won by 57 runs (D/L method)
Sophia Gardens, Cardiff
Umpires: Jeremy Lloyds and Richard Illingworth
Player of the match: Murali Kartik (Surrey)

- Glamorgan won the toss and elected to field.
- Rain reduced the Glamorgan innings to 26 overs.
- John Glover (Glam) made his List A debut.
- Points: Surrey 2, Glamorgan 0.

==== Glamorgan v Durham (10 June) ====
10 June
Scorecard

Glamorgan; 163 (34.3 overs)	v	Durham; 148 (37.5 overs)
Gareth Rees 28 (20); Ben Stokes 3/24 (6.3 overs)		Michael Richardson 45 (64); Simon Jones 4/23 (8 overs)

Glamorgan won by 15 runs
Penrhyn Avenue, Rhos-on-Sea
Umpires: Mark Benson and Paul Baldwin

- Glamorgan won the toss and elected to bat.
- Michael Richardson (Durham) made his List A debut.
- Points: Glamorgan 2, Durham 0.

==== Glamorgan v Somerset (12 June) ====
12 June (D/N)
Scorecard

Glamorgan	v	Somerset

Match abandoned without a ball bowled
Sophia Gardens, Cardiff
Umpires: David Millns and Rob Bailey

- No toss.
- Points: Glamorgan 1, Somerset 1.

==== Somerset v Glamorgan (28 July) ====
28 July
Scorecard

Glamorgan; 250/9 (40 overs)	v	Somerset; 251/7 (37.5 overs)
Chris Cooke 137* (112); Steven Kirby 3/42 (8 overs)		Peter Trego; Dean Cosker 2/37 (8 overs)

Somerset won by 3 wickets
County Ground, Taunton
Umpires: Martin Bodenham and Neil Mallender
Player of the match: Peter Trego (Somst)

- Glamorgan won the toss and elected to bat.
- Points: Somerset 2, Glamorgan 0.

==== Glamorgan v Scotland (29 July) ====
29 July
Scorecard

Scotland; 151/9 (40 overs)	v	Glamorgan; 154/2 (28 overs)
Preston Mommsen 41 (60); Jim Allenby 3/16 (8 overs)		Gareth Rees 60* (81); Richie Berrington 2/37 (8 overs)

Glamorgan won by 8 wickets
Sophia Gardens, Cardiff
Umpires: Martin Bodenham and Neil Mallender

- Scotland won the toss and elected to bat.
- Points: Glamorgan 2, Scotland 0.

==== Glamorgan v Nottinghamshire (5 August) ====
5 August
Scorecard

Glamorgan; 181/8 (40 overs)	v	Nottinghamshire; 107/5 (21 overs)
Ben Wright 62 (70); Graeme White 3/28 (8 overs)		Riki Wessels 38 (41); Dean Cosker 3/26 (6 overs)

Glamorgan won by 2 runs
St Helen's, Swansea
Umpires: Jeremy Lloyds and Tim Robinson

- Glamorgan won the toss and elected to bat.
- Rain reduced the Nottinghamshire innings to 21 overs.
- Points: Glamorgan 2, Nottinghamshire 0.

==== Glamorgan v Hampshire (10 August) ====
10 August (D/N)
Scorecard

Hampshire; 227 (40 overs)	v	Glamorgan; 120 (32.5 overs)
Neil McKenzie 88 (89); Dean Cosker 2/38 (8 overs)		Graham Wagg 28 (40); Chris Wood 5/22 (7.5 overs)

Hampshire won by 107 runs
Sophia Gardens, Cardiff
Umpires: David Millns and Martin Saggers
Player of the match: Neil McKenzie (Hants)

- Glamorgan won the toss and elected to field.
- Points: Hampshire 2, Glamorgan 0.

==== Durham v Glamorgan (12 August) ====
12 August
Scorecard

Durham; 307/2 (40 overs)	v	Glamorgan; 248 (36.2 overs)
Mark Stoneman 112* (110); Andrew Salter 1/49 (8 overs)		Mark Wallace 105 (88); Gareth Breese 4/50 (8 overs)

Durham won by 59 runs
Riverside Ground, Chester-le-Street
Umpires: Martin Bodenham and Peter Hartley

- Durham won the toss and elected to bat.
- Andrew Salter (Glam) made his List A debut.
- Points: Durham 2, Glamorgan 0.

==== Surrey v Glamorgan (21 August) ====
21 August (D/N)
Scorecard

Surrey; 219/9 (40 overs)	v	Glamorgan; 126 (26.3 overs)
Matthew Spriegel 51 (75); Graham Wagg 4/45 (6 overs)		Chris Cooke 31 (21); Gareth Batty 3/4 (2 overs)

Surrey won by 93 runs
The Oval, London
Umpires: Neil Bainton and Nigel Llong
Player of the match: Matthew Spriegel (Surrey)

- Surrey won the toss and elected to bat.
- Points: Surrey 2, Glamorgan 0.

==== Nottinghamshire v Glamorgan (27 August) ====
27 August
Scorecard

Nottinghamshire; 264/6 (40 overs)	v	Glamorgan; 20/0 (5.3 overs)
Alex Hales 94 (87); Andrew Salter 2/41 (8 overs)		Mark Wallace 9* (14)

No result
Trent Bridge, Nottingham
Umpires: Nigel Cowley and Trevor Jesty

- Glamorgan won the toss and elected to field.
- Rain in the interval reduced the Glamorgan innings to 38 overs.
- Rain stopped play after 5.3 overs of the Glamorgan innings.
- Points: Nottinghamshire 1, Glamorgan 1.

== Twenty20 Cup ==
Pos	Team	Pld	W	L	T	NR	Pts	NRR
1	Somerset	10	5	2	0	3	13	0.275
2	Gloucestershire Gladiators	10	4	2	0	4	12	0.248
3	Worcestershire Royals	10	4	3	0	3	11	0.578
4	Warwickshire Bears	10	4	3	0	3	11	−0.033
5	Welsh Dragons	10	2	3	0	5	9	−0.708
6	Northamptonshire Steelbacks	10	1	7	0	2	4	−0.611

Source: ESPNcricinfo

Advanced to the quarter-finals

=== Matches ===
==== Northamptonshire v Glamorgan (14 June) ====
14 June (D/N)
Scorecard

Northamptonshire; 70/3 (9.3 overs)	v	Glamorgan
Kyle Coetzer 41 (29); Jim Allenby 1/1 (0.3 overs)

No result
County Ground, Northampton
Umpires: Jeff Evans and Nigel Llong

- Glamorgan won the toss and elected to field.
- Rain stopped play after 9.3 overs of the Northamptonshire innings.
- Points: Northamptonshire 1, Glamorgan 1.

==== Glamorgan v Warwickshire (17 June) ====
17 June
Scorecard

Warwickshire; 141/5 (18 overs)	v	Glamorgan; 62/1 (8 overs)
Varun Chopra 53 (45); Dean Cosker 2/23 (4 overs)		Shaun Marsh 30* (25); Chris Woakes 1/19 (3 overs)

Glamorgan won by 5 runs (D/L method)
Sophia Gardens, Cardiff
Umpires: George Sharp and Richard Illingworth
Player of the match: Varun Chopra (Warks)

- Warwickshire won the toss and elected to bat.
- Rain reduced the Warwickshire innings to 18 overs, and then reduced the Glamorgan innings to 8 overs.
- Paul Best (Warks) made his T20 debut.
- Points: Glamorgan 2, Warwickshire 0.

==== Somerset v Glamorgan (22 June) ====
22 June
Scorecard

Glamorgan; 178/5 (20 overs)	v	Somerset; 182/6 (19.5 overs)
Shaun Marsh 85 (52); Steven Kirby 1/19 (4 overs)		James Hildreth 107* (60); Robert Croft 2/27 (4 overs)

Somerset won by 4 wickets
County Ground, Taunton
Umpires: Peter Willey and Stephen Gale
Player of the match: James Hildreth (Somst)

- Glamorgan won the toss and elected to bat.
- Points: Somerset 2, Glamorgan 0.

==== Glamorgan v Gloucestershire (23 June) ====
23 June (D/N)
Scorecard

Glamorgan	v	Gloucestershire

Match abandoned without a ball bowled
Sophia Gardens, Cardiff
Umpires: Peter Willey and Stephen Gale

- No toss.
- No play was possible due to rain.
- Points: Glamorgan 1, Gloucestershire 1.

==== Worcestershire v Glamorgan (29 June) ====
29 June
Scorecard

Worcestershire; 164/5 (20 overs)	v	Glamorgan; 145/6 (20 overs)
Phillip Hughes 87* (58); Simon Jones 3/29 (4 overs)		Stewart Walters 40* (30); Moeen Ali 2/27 (4 overs)

Worcestershire won by 19 runs
New Road, Worcester
Umpires: Peter Hartley and Steve Garratt
Player of the match: Phillip Hughes (Worcs)

- Glamorgan won the toss and elected to field.
- Points: Worcestershire 2, Glamorgan 0.

==== Glamorgan v Northamptonshire (30 June) ====
30 June (D/N)
Scorecard

Glamorgan; 110/9 (20 overs)	v	Northamptonshire; 111/1 (13.1 overs)
Stewart Walters 34* (27); Con de Lange 3/15 (4 overs)		Alex Wakely 54* (40); Jim Allenby 1/11 (2 overs)

Northamptonshire won by 9 wickets
Sophia Gardens, Cardiff
Umpires: Jeremy Lloyds and Peter Hartley
Player of the match: Alex Wakely (Northants)

- Northamptonshire won the toss and elected to field.
- Points: Northamptonshire 2, Glamorgan 0.

==== Gloucestershire v Glamorgan (2 July) ====
2 July
Scorecard

Gloucestershire	v	Glamorgan

Match abandoned without a ball bowled
County Ground, Bristol
Umpires: Martin Bodenham and Trevor Jesty

- No toss.
- No play was possible due to rain.
- Points: Gloucestershire 1, Glamorgan 1.

==== Glamorgan v Worcestershire (3 July) ====
3 July
Scorecard

Glamorgan	v	Worcestershire

Match abandoned without a ball bowled
Sophia Gardens, Cardiff
Umpires: Jeff Evans and Steve Garratt

- No toss.
- No play was possible due to rain.
- Points: Glamorgan 1, Worcestershire 1.

==== Glamorgan v Somerset (6 July) ====
6 July
Scorecard

Glamorgan	v	Somerset

Match abandoned without a ball bowled
Sophia Gardens, Cardiff
Umpires: Mark Benson and Neil Bainton

- No toss.
- No play was possible due to rain.
- Points: Glamorgan 1, Somerset 1.

==== Warwickshire v Glamorgan (8 July) ====
8 July
Scorecard

Glamorgan; 173/5 (20 overs)	v	Warwickshire; 61/4 (9 overs)
Shaun Marsh 68 (51); Chris Wright 2/43 (4 overs)		Varun Chopra 20 (18); Marcus North 1/5 (1 over)

Glamorgan won by 22 runs (D/L method)
Edgbaston, Birmingham
Umpires: Steve Garratt and Trevor Jesty
Player of the match: Shaun Marsh (Glam)

- Warwickshire won the toss and elected to field.
- Rain stopped play after 9 overs of the Warwickshire innings.
- Points: Glamorgan 2, Warwickshire 0.

== Pre-season and friendlies ==
=== Two-day: Somerset v Glamorgan (19–20 March) ===
19–20 March
Scorecard

Somerset	v	Glamorgan
137 (34.2 overs); Craig Meschede 32; Jim Allenby 3/20 (6 overs)		356/8d (78.1 overs); Graham Wagg 76; Arul Suppiah 3/13 (7 overs)
231/2d (58.2 overs); Marcus Trescothick 104*; Graham Wagg 1/10 (6 overs)		13/0 (5.1 overs); Stewart Walters 12*

Glamorgan won by 10 wickets
County Ground, Taunton
Umpires: Mike Burns and Mike Tandy

- Glamorgan won the toss and elected to field.
- Both teams agreed to bat for a maximum of 100 overs.
- 12 players per side (11 batting, 11 fielding).

=== 40-over: Gloucestershire v Glamorgan (23 March) ===
23 March
Scorecard

Gloucestershire; 202/4 (40 overs)	v	Glamorgan; 203/7 (39.5 overs)
Ian Cockbain 63*; Simon Jones 2/34 (8.3 overs)		Nick James 55; Jack Taylor 3/51 (9 overs)

Glamorgan won by 3 wickets
County Ground, Bristol
Umpires: Bob Hampshire and D. Burns

- Glamorgan won the toss and elected to field.
- 12 players per side (11 batting, 11 fielding).

=== 40-over: Worcestershire v Glamorgan (26 March) ===
26 March
Scorecard

Glamorgan; 264/9 (40 overs)	v	Worcestershire; 265/6 (39.1 overs)
Ben Wright 104 (108); David Lucas 4/25 (8 overs)		Daryl Mitchell 78* (64); Chris Ashling 4/53 (8 overs)

Worcestershire won by 4 wickets
New Road, Worcester
Umpires: Andy Hicks and Vanburn Holder

- Glamorgan won the toss and elected to bat.
- 12 players per side (11 batting, 11 fielding).

=== 40-over: Kent v Glamorgan (27 March) ===
27 March
Scorecard

Glamorgan; 266/6 (40 overs)	v	Kent; 259 (39.4 overs)
Stewart Walters 144*; Brendan Nash 2/30 (6 overs)		Sam Billings 48; Dean Cosker 2/40 (8 overs)

Glamorgan won by 7 runs
St Lawrence Ground, Canterbury
Umpires: Malcolm Austin and P. Higgins

- Glamorgan won the toss and elected to bat.
- 12 players per side (11 batting, 11 fielding).

=== Two-day: Kent v Glamorgan (28–29 March) ===
28–29 March
Scorecard

Glamorgan	v	Kent
263 (78.3 overs); Mark Wallace 103; Simon Cook 3/69 (18 overs)		312/5d (88 overs); Ben Harmison 130*; Dean Cosker 3/54 (20 overs)

Match drawn
St Lawrence Ground, Canterbury
Umpires: Graeme Hall and Ken Say

- Glamorgan won the toss and elected to bat.
- Both sides could name up to 12 players (11 batting, 11 fielding).

=== Three-day: Oxford MCCU v Glamorgan (31 March – 2 April) ===
31 March – 2 April
Scorecard

Glamorgan	v	Oxford MCCU
346/7d (85.5 overs); Mark Wallace 122* (144); Dan Conway 3/67 (22 overs)		123 (64.1 overs); Ben Jeffery 39 (109); Huw Waters 4/12 (18 overs)
167/2d (58 overs); Nick James 83 (108); Sam Agarwal 1/15 (9 overs)		137 (52 overs); Sam Agarwal 51 (74); Dean Cosker 4/22 (11 overs)

Glamorgan won by 253 runs
The Parks, Oxford
Umpires: Ben Debenham and Trevor Jesty

- Oxford MCCU won the toss and elected to field.
- Charlie Morris, Freddie John and Jamie Thompson (all Oxford MCCU) made their first-class debuts.

== Statistics ==
=== Batting ===
First-class
Player	Matches	Innings	NO	Runs	HS	Ave	SR	100	50	0	4s	6s
Stewart Walters	14	23	2	813	159	38.71	51.06	1	7	0	105	1
Mark Wallace	16	24	5	775	122*	40.78	64.47	3	1	4	87	3
Jim Allenby	15	22	4	733	125*	40.72	57.85	2	3	0	76	11
Ben Wright	16	27	3	661	104	27.54	46.71	1	1	0	81	1
Will Bragg	15	25	0	648	92	25.92	54.68	0	5	3	92	0
Marcus North	9	13	0	577	116	44.38	57.35	1	5	1	75	2
Gareth Rees	12	20	0	413	66	20.65	41.38	0	1	2	57	2
Nick James	9	17	0	327	83	19.23	40.17	0	1	2	49	0
Graham Wagg	9	13	0	263	60	20.23	70.13	0	2	2	27	5
Dean Cosker	15	17	3	243	49*	17.35	51.37	0	0	2	27	0
Source: ESPNcricinfo

List A
Player	Matches	Innings	NO	Runs	HS	Ave	SR	100	50	0	4s	6s
Chris Cooke	11	9	1	249	137*	31.12	102.04	1	0	0	20	4
Mark Wallace	11	10	1	212	105	23.55	95.49	1	0	0	26	0
Gareth Rees	11	10	2	194	60*	24.25	67.12	0	1	0	22	3
Stewart Walters	11	8	1	183	68	26.14	74.08	0	1	0	17	1
Jim Allenby	7	7	1	130	39*	21.66	73.86	0	0	0	14	1
Marcus North	8	6	0	125	59	20.83	65.78	0	1	0	7	1
Ben Wright	9	6	0	116	62	19.33	82.85	0	1	0	7	2
Graham Wagg	5	4	0	62	28	15.50	76.54	0	0	0	5	1
Dean Cosker	10	8	2	51	25	8.50	76.11	0	0	2	4	1
Nick James	4	2	0	38	37	19.00	95.00	0	0	0	2	0
Source: ESPNcricinfo

Twenty20
Player	Matches	Innings	NO	Runs	HS	Ave	SR	100	50	0	4s	6s
Shaun Marsh	6	5	1	209	85	52.25	129.81	0	2	0	21	8
Jim Allenby	6	5	1	94	33	23.50	125.33	0	0	0	9	4
Martin van Jaarsveld	6	4	0	87	36	21.75	119.17	0	0	0	9	2
Stewart Walters	6	3	3	75	40*	—	129.31	0	0	0	6	1
Mark Wallace	6	3	0	47	25	15.66	142.42	0	0	0	7	2
Marcus North	6	5	1	47	17	11.75	77.04	0	0	0	4	1
Chris Cooke	5	4	0	42	32	10.50	168.00	0	0	2	3	3
Dean Cosker	5	1	0	13	13	13.00	100.00	0	0	0	1	0
James Harris	5	2	1	13	13*	13.00	86.66	0	0	1	1	0
Robert Croft	6	1	0	3	3	3.00	21.42	0	0	0	0	0
Source: ESPNcricinfo

=== Bowling ===
First-class
Player	Matches	Innings	Overs	Maidens	Runs	Wickets	BBI	BBM	Ave	Econ	SR	5w	10w
Jim Allenby	15	24	359.3	80	992	42	4/39	5/54	23.61	2.75	51.35	0	0
Huw Waters	13	20	304.2	79	798	39	7/53	9/98	20.46	2.62	46.82	2	0
Graham Wagg	9	16	246.3	45	769	32	6/44	8/65	24.03	3.11	46.21	1	0
Robert Croft	7	10	141.3	27	403	23	5/31	8/104	17.52	2.84	36.91	2	0
John Glover	7	13	176.4	40	585	19	4/76	7/121	30.78	3.31	55.78	0	0
Moises Henriques	5	8	95.0	18	323	16	4/54	6/94	20.18	3.40	35.62	0	0
Dean Cosker	15	24	361.3	83	991	16	4/22	5/46	61.93	2.74	135.56	0	0
James Harris	4	6	129.0	19	402	10	5/118	5/127	40.20	3.11	77.40	1	0
Mike Reed	4	8	88.0	10	310	8	3/39	4/91	38.75	3.52	66.00	0	0
Marcus North	9	8	73.0	8	223	7	3/40	3/40	31.85	3.05	62.57	0	0
Will Owen	3	4	56.2	5	238	7	4/87	6/141	34.00	4.22	48.28	0	0
Source: ESPNcricinfo

List A
Player	Matches	Innings	Overs	Maidens	Runs	Wickets	BBI	Ave	Econ	SR	4w	5w
Simon Jones	11	11	71.0	0	443	13	4/23	34.07	6.23	32.76	1	0
Jim Allenby	7	7	49.5	5	183	12	3/16	15.25	3.67	24.91	0	0
Graham Wagg	5	5	34.0	0	229	10	4/45	22.90	6.73	20.40	1	0
Dean Cosker	10	9	68.0	5	295	9	3/26	32.77	4.33	45.33	0	0
John Glover	5	5	36.0	0	230	7	3/34	32.85	6.38	30.85	0	0
Will Owen	4	4	17.3	0	80	4	2/38	20.00	4.57	26.25	0	0
James Harris	5	5	35.0	1	217	4	2/36	54.25	6.20	52.50	0	0
Andrew Salter	2	2	16.0	0	90	3	2/41	30.00	5.62	32.00	0	0
Robert Croft	1	1	4.0	0	15	1	1/15	15.00	3.75	24.00	0	0
Alex Jones	1	1	4.0	0	31	1	1/31	31.00	7.75	24.00	0	0
Nick James	4	2	7.0	0	41	1	1/33	41.00	5.85	42.00	0	0
Source: ESPNcricinfo

Twenty20
Player	Matches	Innings	Overs	Maidens	Runs	Wickets	BBI	Ave	Econ	SR	4w	5w
Simon Jones	6	6	19.0	0	128	7	3/29	18.28	6.73	16.28	0	0
Robert Croft	6	6	18.0	1	131	4	2/27	32.75	7.27	27.00	0	0
James Harris	5	5	15.0	2	146	4	2/48	36.50	9.73	22.50	0	0
Dean Cosker	5	5	13.1	0	104	3	2/23	34.66	7.89	26.33	0	0
Jim Allenby	6	6	15.2	0	125	3	1/1	41.66	8.15	30.66	0	0
Marcus North	6	4	4.0	0	21	1	1/5	21.00	5.25	24.00	0	0
Will Owen	2	2	5.0	0	59	1	1/20	59.00	11.80	30.00	0	0
Source: ESPNcricinfo
