= 2014 Minor Counties Championship =

- Administrator(s): England and Wales Cricket Board
- Cricket format: (3 days, 4 day final)
- Tournament format(s): League system
- Champions: Staffordshire (11th title)
- Participants: 20
- Matches: 61
- Most runs: Rick Moore (633 for Cheshire)
- Most wickets: Gurman Randhawa (37 for Shropshire)

The 2014 Minor Counties Championship was the 110th Minor Counties Cricket Championship season, and the first under the name 'Unicorn Counties Championship'. It was contested through two divisions: Eastern and Western. Staffordshire were the champions for the eleventh time, remaining the most successful club in the history of the competition.

== Standings ==
- Pld = Played, W = Wins, W1 = Win in match reduced to single innings, L = Losses, L1 = Loss in match reduced to single innings, T = Ties, D = Draws, D1 = Draw in match reduced to single innings, A = Abandonments, Bat = Batting points, Bowl = Bowling points, Ded = Deducted points, Pts = Points, Net RPW = Net runs per wicket (runs per wicket for less runs per wicket against).

Teams receive 16 points for a win, 8 for a tie and 4 for a draw. Teams also received 12 points for a win, 6 for a draw and 4 points for losing a match reduced to a single innings. Bonus points (a maximum of 4 batting points and 4 bowling points) may be scored during the first 90 overs of each team's first innings.

=== Eastern Division ===
Team	Pld	W	W1	L	L1	T	D	D1	A	Bat	Bowl	Ded	Pts	Net RPW
Staffordshire (C)	6	4	0	0	0	0	2	0	0	22	24	0	118	+13.514
Cumberland	6	4	0	0	0	0	2	0	0	16	20	0	108	+11.707
Cambridgeshire	6	3	0	1	0	0	2	0	0	15	22	-2	91	+9.375
Lincolnshire	6	3	0	2	0	0	1	0	0	17	22	0	91	+4.171
Suffolk	6	2	0	1	0	0	3	0	0	14	20	0	78	+7.156
Buckinghamshire	6	2	0	3	0	0	1	0	0	12	20	0	68	-7.764
Norfolk	6	1	0	2	0	0	3	0	0	11	23	0	62	-5.530
Hertfordshire	6	1	0	3	0	0	2	0	0	12	22	0	58	-8.133
Bedfordshire	6	0	0	3	0	0	3	0	0	12	19	-2	41	-9.856
Northumberland	6	0	0	5	0	0	1	0	0	11	21	0	36	-13.570

=== Western Division ===
Team	Pld	W	W1	L	L1	T	D	D1	A	Bat	Bowl	Ded	Pts	Net RPW
Wiltshire	6	4	0	1	0	0	1	0	0	12	24	0	104	+5.977
Herefordshire	6	4	0	1	0	0	1	0	0	10	24	0	102	+13.292
Devon	6	3	0	1	0	0	2	0	0	13	24	0	93	+5.650
Cheshire	6	3	0	1	0	0	2	0	0	11	24	0	91	+1.339
Dorset	6	3	0	2	0	0	1	0	0	7	23	0	82	-0.934
Shropshire	6	3	0	3	0	0	1	0	0	12	18	0	78	-2.103
Oxfordshire	6	1	0	3	0	0	2	0	0	12	22	0	58	-3.118
Wales Minor Counties	6	1	0	3	0	0	2	0	0	8	24	0	56	-1.897
Cornwall	6	1	0	4	0	0	1	0	0	2	24	0	46	-5.699
Berkshire	6	4	0	2	0	0	1	0	0	11	24	0	43	-9.805

== Final ==
7–9 September
Scorecard

Staffordshire	v	(H) Wiltshire
227 (63.1 overs); Peter Wilshaw 52 (79); Ed Young 6/72 (17.1 overs)		231 (75.4 overs); Uzair Qureshi 90 (216); Matthew Parkinson 3/62 (17.4 overs)
254 (80.4 overs); Peter Wilshaw 107 (183); Tahir Afridi 5/44 (24.4 overs)		222 (81.5 overs); Michael Coles 87 (198); Greg Willott 4/28 (12 overs)

Staffordshire won by 28 runs
Salisbury and South Wiltshire Sports Club
Umpires: Anthony Harris and Steve Malone

- Staffordshire won the toss and elected to bat

== Averages ==
Most runs
Aggregate	Average	Player	County
633	52.75	Rick Moore	Cheshire
627	104.50	Ben Howgego	Cambridgeshire
602	46.30	Jayden Levitt	Wiltshire
591	84.42	Michael Hill	Staffordshire
565	47.08	Karanjit Bansal	Lincolnshire

Most wickets
Aggregate	Average	Player	County
37	17.97	Gurman Randhawa	Shropshire
36	16.63	Paul Byrne	Shropshire
35	20.25	Tahir Afridi	Wiltshire
35	23.82	Tom Huggins	Suffolk
33	10.69	Bradley Wadlan	Herefordshire
