= Laidman =

Laidman is both an English masculine given name and a surname. Notable people with the name include:

== Surname ==
- Fred Laidman (1913–1987), English footballer
- Harvey Laidman (1942–2025), American television director
- Matthew Laidman (born 1992), English cricketer

== Given name ==
- Laidman Browne (1896–1961), English radio and film actor
