= Michael Porter (disambiguation) =

Michael Porter (born 1947) is an American academic

Michael Porter may also refer to:

- Michael Porter (wrestling) (1951–2010), American professional wrestling ring announcer and internet radio host
- Michael Porter Jr. (born 1998), American basketball player
- Michael Porter (footballer) (born 1945), Australian rules footballer
- Michael Porter (cricketer) (born 1995), English cricketer
- Michael Porter (rugby league) (born 1964), Australian rugby league player
- Michael G. Porter (Tasman Institute), Australian think-tank founder and economist
- Mikey Porter (born 2007), British racing driver
