= Michael Porter (cricketer) =

English cricketer (born 1995)

Personal information
- Full name: Michael John Porter
- Born: 21 April 1995 (age 31); Poole, Dorset, England
- Batting: Right-handed
- Bowling: Right-arm medium

Domestic team information
- Years: Team
- 2012–2019: Dorset
- 2014: Hampshire

Career statistics
Competition	List A
Matches	1
Runs scored	0
Batting average	–
100s/50s	–/–
Top score	–
Catches/stumpings	1/–
- Source: Cricinfo, 12 August 2015

Michael James Porter (born 21 April 1995) is an English former cricketer.

Porter was born in Poole in April 1995. He was educated at Poole Grammar School, before advancing to study for a BTEC in sports performance at Brockenhurst College, as a result of which he gained a scholarship to study at Southampton Solent University. Alongside playing club cricket for Bashley (Rydal) in the Southern Premier Cricket League, Porter was a member of the cricket academy at Hampshire. He made a single appearance for Hampshire in a List A one-day match against Sri Lanka A at the Rose Bowl in 2014. However, the match was abandoned after 18 overs due to rain, with Porter not having batted or bowled. This was to be his only senior appearance for Hampshire.

Two years prior to that match, he had made his debut in minor counties cricket for Dorset in the MCCA Knockout Trophy against Buckinghamshire, whilst the following season he debuted in the 2013 Minor Counties Championship against Shropshire. Just after scoring 96 against Oxfordshire in the 2014 Minor Counties Championship, Porter was chosen as England's twelfth man in the Third Test of their series against India at the Rose Bowl. He continued to play minor counties cricket for Dorset until 2019, making 21 appearances in the Minor Counties Championship, eighteen in the MCCA Knockout Trophy, and nine in the Minor Counties T20.

He played club cricket for Bashley (Rydal) for a number of years, with Porter captaining the club for six years until 2022, having led them to the 2019 Southern Premier Cricket League title. His resignation of the captaincy was necessitated by his relocation from Parley in Hampshire to Bridgwater in Somerset. He is a supporter of AFC Bournemouth.

== External list ==
- Michael Porter at Cricinfo
