= 2013 Minor Counties Championship =

- Administrator(s): England and Wales Cricket Board
- Cricket format: (3 days, 4 day final)
- Tournament format(s): League system
- Champions: Cheshire (7th title)
- Participants: 20
- Matches: 61
- Most runs: Tom Huggins (751 for Suffolk)
- Most wickets: Daniel Woods (59 for Cheshire)

The 2013 Minor Counties Championship was the 109th Minor Counties Cricket Championship season. It was contested through two divisions: Eastern and Western. Cheshire were Minor County Champions for the fifth time outright and seventh in total.

== Standings ==
- Pld = Played, W = Wins, W1 = Win in match reduced to single innings, L = Losses, L1 = Loss in match reduced to single innings, T = Ties, D = Draws, D1 = Draw in match reduced to single innings, A = Abandonments, Bat = Batting points, Bowl = Bowling points, Ded = Deducted points, Pts = Points, Net RPW = Net runs per wicket (runs per wicket for less runs per wicket against).

Teams receive 16 points for a win, 8 for a tie and 4 for a draw. Teams also received 12 points for a win, 6 for a draw and 4 points for losing a match reduced to a single innings. Bonus points (a maximum of 4 batting points and 4 bowling points) may be scored during the first 90 overs of each team's first innings.

=== Eastern Division ===
Team	Pld	W	W1	L	L1	T	D	D1	A	Bat	Bowl	Ded	Pts	Net RPW
Cambridgeshire	6	5	0	1	0	0	0	0	0	15	21	0	116	10.148
Suffolk	6	4	0	1	0	0	1	0	0	14	23	0	105	11.474
Hertfordshire	6	3	0	1	0	0	2	0	0	20	23	0	99	5.989
Norfolk	6	3	0	2	0	0	1	0	0	20	20	0	92	3.059
Staffordshire	6	1	0	2	0	0	3	0	0	13	22	0	63	-1.248
Buckinghamshire	6	1	0	1	0	0	4	0	0	16	15	0	63	-10.550
Cumberland	6	1	0	2	0	0	3	0	0	10	23	0	61	2.164
Lincolnshire	6	1	0	3	0	0	2	0	0	14	21	0	59	-11.314
Bedfordshire	6	0	0	2	0	0	4	0	0	14	18	0	48	-17.287
Northumberland	6	0	0	4	0	0	2	0	0	16	19	0	43	-5.804

=== Western Division ===
Team	Pld	W	W1	L	L1	T	D	D1	A	Bat	Bowl	Ded	Pts	Net RPW
Cheshire (C)	6	5	0	0	0	0	1	0	0	21	18	0	123	8.301
Wales Minor Counties	6	5	0	0	0	0	1	0	0	14	22	0	120	7.112
Shropshire	6	4	0	1	0	0	1	0	0	15	23	0	106	7.035
Devon	6	3	0	2	0	0	1	0	0	12	23	-2	85	0.932
Berkshire	6	3	0	2	0	0	1	0	0	12	19	0	83	3.186
Herefordshire	6	2	0	2	0	0	2	0	0	18	23	0	81	1.625
Cornwall	6	1	1	3	0	0	1	0	0	5	20	0	57	-3.379
Oxfordshire	6	1	0	4	0	0	1	0	0	9	24	0	53	-5.003
Wiltshire	6	0	0	5	0	0	1	0	0	18	24	-2	44	-6.399
Dorset	6	0	0	5	1	0	0	0	0	8	17	0	29	-13.688

== Final ==
8–11 September
Scorecard

Cambridgeshire (H)	v	Cheshire
296 (85.5 overs); Ben Howgego 56 (90); Daniel Woods 5/75 (27.5 overs)		372/9 (90 overs); Richard Moore 175 (253); Lewis Bruce 4/101 (20 overs)
250 (99 overs); Alan Burton 52 (112); Adam Syddall 3/53 (22 overs)		303/5d (51.5 overs); Jonathon Kettle 143 (167); Paul McMahon 3/99 (19.5 overs)

Cheshire won by 129 runs
Wisbech Cricket Club Ground
Umpires: Martyn Dobbs and Chris Watts

- Cheshire won the toss and elected to bat.

== Averages ==
Most runs
Aggregate	Average	Player	County
751	83.44	Tom Huggins	Suffolk
619	77.37	Josh Bess	Devon
612	47.07	Khalid Sawas	Cheshire
600	60.00	George Thurstance	Bedfordshire
579	52.63	Kadeer Ali	Staffordshire

Most wickets
Aggregate	Average	Player	County
59	13.57	Daniel Woods	Cheshire
50	16.02	Paul McMahon	Cambridgeshire
39	17.07	Richard Logan	Berkshire
38	24.05	Shakeel Ahmed	Cornwall
36	17.77	Tom Huggins	Suffolk
