= Thomas Huggins =

Thomas Huggins may refer to:

- Tom Huggins, cricketer
- Thomas Huggins (MP)
- Thomas Huggins, founder of Impact Fighting Championships
