= John Glover (cricketer, born 1989) =

Welsh cricketer

Personal information
- Full name: John Charles Glover
- Born: 29 August 1989 (age 37); Cardiff, Glamorgan, Wales
- Nickname: Box
- Height: 6 ft 5 in (1.96 m)
- Batting: Right-handed
- Bowling: Right-arm medium fast

Domestic team information
- Years: Team
- 2011–present: Glamorgan (squad no. 36)
- 2008–2010: Durham UCCE/MCCU
- 2008–present: Wales Minor Counties

Career statistics
Competition	First-class	List A
Matches	26	5
Runs scored	328	16
Batting average	13.12	8.00
100s/50s	–/1	–/–
Top score	55	10
Balls bowled	3,441	216
Wickets	53	7
Bowling average	36.69	32.85
5 wickets in innings	1	–
10 wickets in match	–	–
Best bowling	5/38	3/34
Catches/stumpings	7/–	1/–
- Source: Cricinfo, 29 September 2013

John Charles Glover (born 29 August 1989) is a Welsh cricketer. Glover is a right-handed batsman who bowls right-arm medium-fast. He was born in Cardiff, Glamorgan and educated at Llantarnam School in Cwmbran.

While studying for his degree at Durham University, Glover made his first-class debut for Durham UCCE against Derbyshire in 2008. He appeared in seven further first-class matches for the university, the last of which was in 2010 against Durham, by which time the university was playing as Durham MCCU following a change of name for the 2010 season. In his seven first-class matches, he took 15 wickets at an average of 40.06, with best figures of 5/38. These figures, his only five wicket haul in first-class cricket, came against Durham in 2009.

Glover plays county cricket for Wales Minor Counties, making his debut for the team in the 2008 season against Berkshire in the Minor Counties Championship. He continues to play minor counties cricket for Wales Minor Counties, as well as having played for the Glamorgan Second XI. Toward the end of the 2011 season, Glover made his debut for Glamorgan in a first-class match against Gloucestershire in the County Championship at the County Ground, Bristol. He made two further first-class appearances in that season for the county, against Middlesex and Kent. In the 2012 season, he has made seven first-class appearances in the County Championship, as well as making his List A debut against Surrey at the SWALEC Stadium in the 2012 Clydesdale Bank 40.

In August 2012, Glover signed a new two-year contract with Glamorgan until the end of the 2014 season, when he retired.

== Career best performances ==
as of 29 September 2013

	Batting				Bowling			
	Score	Fixture	Venue	Season	Score	Fixture	Venue	Season
FC	55	Glamorgan v Kent	Cardiff	2012	5–38	Durham UCCE v Durham	Durham	2009
LA	10	Welsh Dragons v Hampshire Royals	Cardiff	2012	3–34	Welsh Dragons v Scottish Saltires	Cardiff	2012
