= Nicholas Woods =

English cricketer (born 1986)

Personal information
- Full name: Nicholas James Woods
- Born: 2 January 1986 (age 40); Bolton, Lancashire, England
- Batting: Right-handed
- Bowling: Leg break

Domestic team information
- Years: Team
- 2005–2007: Oxford UCCE
- 2005–2007: Oxford University

Career statistics
Competition	First-class
Matches	9
Runs scored	231
Batting average	23.10
100s/50s	–/–
Top score	27
Balls bowled	1,320
Wickets	11
Bowling average	65.27
5 wickets in innings	–
10 wickets in match	–
Best bowling	3/46
Catches/stumpings	5/–
- Source: Cricinfo, 3 March 2020

Nicholas James Woods (born 2 January 1986) is an English former first-class cricketer.

The son of Steve Woods, he was born at Bolton in January 1986. He was educated in Bolton at St James CE Secondary School and at Winstanley College in Wigan, before going up to Queen's College, Oxford. While studying at Oxford he played first-class cricket for both Oxford University and Oxford UCCE from 2005–07, making nine appearances. (Note: Oxford UCCE differed from Oxford University Cricket Club in that it was open to students at Oxford Brookes University, whereas Oxford University Cricket Club is exclusively for students of the constituent colleges of the University of Oxford.) Six of these were for Oxford UCCE, while the remaining three were for Oxford University against Cambridge University in The University Match. He scored 231 runs in his nine first-class matches, at an average of 23.10 and a high score of 27. With his leg break bowling, he took 11 wickets at a bowling average of 65.27 and best figures of 3 for 46. Woods trialled for Lancashire, but was unable to secure a contract.
