= Stephen Moreton =

Personal information
- Full name: Stephen John Patrick Moreton
- Born: 9 September 1984 (age 42); Birmingham, Warwickshire, England
- Batting: Right-handed
- Bowling: Leg break

Domestic team information
- Years: Team
- 2007: Staffordshire
- 2005–2006: Oxford UCCE

Career statistics
Competition	First-class
Matches	6
Runs scored	273
Batting average	24.81
100s/50s	–/2
Top score	74
Balls bowled	389
Wickets	8
Bowling average	37.12
5 wickets in innings	–
10 wickets in match	–
Best bowling	2/24
Catches/stumpings	2/–
- Source: Cricinfo, 29 April 2012

Stephen John Patrick Moreton (born 9 September 1984) is a former Irish cricketer. Moreton is a right-handed batsman who bowls leg break. He was born at Birmingham, Warwickshire.

While attending Oxford Brookes University, Moreton made his first-class debut for Oxford UCCE against Gloucestershire at the University Parks in 2005. Moreton made five further first-class appearances for Oxford UCCE, the last of which came against Durham in 2006. In his seven first-class matches, he scored a total of 273 runs at an average of 24.81, with a high score of 74. This score, which was one of two half centuries he made came against Lancashire. With the ball, he took 8 wickets at a bowling average of 37.12, with best figures of 2/24.

In August 2005, Moreton was rated as having bowled the fifth worst over of all time by Simon Lister when writing for the website Cricinfo. The over in question came on his first-class debut against Gloucestershire. Moreton was given the ball close to the close of play on day two of the match, by which stage Gloucestershire had a first-innings lead approaching 400 and Craig Spearman unbeaten on 136. Spearman dispatched Moreton's first over in first-class cricket for 34 runs, hitting 6, 6, 6, 6, 4, 6, to advance his score to 170. The over ranks as the seventh most expensive of all time in first-class cricket. (Note: If Robert Vance's over for Wellington against Canterbury in 1990 which conceded 75 runs were included, Moreton's over would be the eighth most expensive. However, these figures are generally excluded from the records because the bowler deliberately conceded runs in an attempt to manufacture an otherwise unlikely victory.)

After playing first-class cricket for Oxford UCCE, Moreton had spells playing Second XI cricket for first-class county second XI's, while in 2007 he played a single Minor Counties Championship match for Staffordshire against Suffolk. Having been unable to secure a career playing the game, Moreton moved onto coaching. In November 2010, he was named as the coach of the Ireland women's cricket team, replacing Paul Delany who had resigned earlier in the year. His appointment was on a temporary basis and he was later replaced by Jeremy Bray.
