= Jonty Strachan =

English cricketer

Personal information
- Full name: Jonathan Peter Strachan
- Born: 9 September 1987 (age 39); Cape Town, Cape Province, South Africa
- Height: 6 ft 2 in (1.88 m)
- Batting: Right-handed
- Bowling: Right-arm medium-fast

Domestic team information
- Years: Team
- 2008–2009: Oxford University
- 2009: Oxford UCCE

Career statistics
Competition	First-class
Matches	3
Runs scored	18
Batting average	6.00
100s/50s	–/–
Top score	13*
Balls bowled	438
Wickets	4
Bowling average	58.50
5 wickets in innings	–
10 wickets in match	–
Best bowling	2/48
Catches/stumpings	1/–
- Source: Cricinfo, 1 July 2020

Jonathan 'Jonty' Peter Strachan (born 9 September 1987) is a South African-born English former first-class cricketer.

Strachan was born at Cape Town in September 1987. He was educated in England at Dean Close School, before going up to The Queen's College, Oxford. While studying at Oxford, Strachan made two appearances in first-class cricket for Oxford University against Cambridge University in The University Matches of 2008 and 2009. In addition to playing for Oxford University, Strachan also made a single first-class appearance for Oxford UCCE against Nottinghamshire at Oxford in 2009. (Note: Oxford UCCE differed from Oxford University Cricket Club in that it was open to students at Oxford Brookes University, whereas Oxford University Cricket Club is exclusively for students of the constituent colleges of the University of Oxford.) A right-arm medium-fast bowler, he took 4 wickets in his three first-class matches.

Strachan is currently employed by Soletanche Freyssinet, where he is the director of mergers and acquisitions.
