= Huw Waters =

Welsh cricketer (born 1986)

Personal information
- Full name: Huw Thomas Waters
- Born: 26 September 1986 (age 40); Cardiff, Wales
- Batting: Right-handed
- Bowling: Right-arm medium
- Role: Bowler

Domestic team information
- Years: Team
- 2005: Wales Minor Counties
- 2005–2014: Glamorgan (squad no. 17)
- FC debut: 8 July 2005 Glamorgan v Nottinghamshire
- LA debut: 4 May 2005 Wales Minor Counties v Nottinghamshire

Career statistics
Competition	FC	LA	T20
Matches	51	22	4
Runs scored	411	24	11
Batting average	12.45	4.80	–
100s/50s	0/1	0/0	0/0
Top score	54	8	11*
Balls bowled	6,678	816	85
Wickets	110	14	3
Bowling average	31.13	60.28	39.33
5 wickets in innings	3	0	0
10 wickets in match	0	0	0
Best bowling	7/53	3/47	3/30
Catches/stumpings	12/–	3/–	0/–
- Source: ESPNcricinfo, 25 April 2017

Huw Thomas Waters (born 26 September 1986) is a former Welsh cricketer. He was a right-handed batsman and a right-arm fast-medium-pace bowler, who played for Glamorgan.

He attended the Sixth Form at Monmouth School, and was ever-present in the School 1st XI cricket team, before making his debut for Glamorgan in 2005.

He was named in the England Under-19s' tour of Bangladesh, but had to withdraw his place because of an injury to his wrist. He was subsequently able to return to the squad, thanks to the subsequent withdrawal of Richard Jones from the team.

Waters went to Australia for the best part of six months playing his professional sport there.

In 2012, he topped the first-class batting averages for Glamorgan, with a batting average of 53.00. This was mainly because Waters was not out 12 times out of 14 innings.

Glamorgan and England had high hopes for the man dubbed "The next Simon Jones" for his ability to reverse swing the ball at good pace, but Waters' potential was not realised, as he was forced to retire in August 2014 due to exercise-induced dystonia.

== Career best performances ==
as of 19 November 2012

	Batting				Bowling			
	Score	Fixture	Venue	Season	Score	Fixture	Venue	Season
FC	54	Glamorgan v Surrey	Cardiff	2011	7/53	Glamorgan v Hampshire	Cardiff	2012
LA	8	Glamorgan Dragons v Hampshire Hawks	Swansea	2007	3/47	Glamorgan Dragons v Durham Dynamos	Chester-le-Street	2007
T20	11*	Glamorgan Dragons v Hampshire Royals	Southampton	2010	3/30	Glamorgan Dragons v Hampshire Royals	Southampton	2010
