= Nick James (cricketer) =

English cricketer

Personal information
- Full name: Nicholas Alexander James
- Born: 17 September 1986 (age 40); Sandwell, West Midlands, England
- Height: 5 ft 10 in (1.78 m)
- Batting: Left-handed
- Bowling: Slow left-arm orthodox
- Role: All-rounder

Domestic team information
- Years: Team
- 2006–2008: Warwickshire
- 2006–2009: Staffordshire
- 2009–2013: Glamorgan (squad no. 11)
- 2010–2011: Wales Minor Counties

Career statistics
Competition	FC	LA	T20
Matches	15	20	14
Runs scored	622	212	83
Batting average	23.92	19.27	13.83
100s/50s	0/2	0/0	0/0
Top score	83	43	27
Balls bowled	270	396	192
Wickets	6	15	7
Bowling average	25.66	21.60	35.14
5 wickets in innings	0	0	0
10 wickets in match	0	0	0
Best bowling	2/28	3/36	2/22
Catches/stumpings	4/–	3/–	8/–
- Source: Cricinfo, 24 October 2013

Nicholas Alexander James (born 17 September 1986) is an English former professional cricketer. He is a left-handed batsman and a slow left-arm bowler.

While studying at King Edward VI Aston in Birmingham James made his debut for the Warwickshire Second XI in September 2004, with whom he played for three seasons and competed in the 2005 Second XI Trophy. James then joined the Warwickshire First XI and represented the county in the 2006 C&G Trophy, though Warwickshire finished second to last in the table that season and thus did not progress to the second round of the competition.

During the spring of 2006, James also represented Staffordshire in the MCCA Trophy.

Towards the end of the 2009 Cricket season James was taken on trial by Glamorgan. After successful performances in the Pro40 league James was signed by the Welsh county.

In 2011, James signed a new two-year contract with Glamorgan, taking him up to the end of the 2013 season.

In the 2013 season, James only appeared for Glamorgan in the Twenty 20 playing 8 out of Glamorgan's 10 games in total. He was released at the end of the season.

== Career best performances ==
	Batting				Bowling (innings)			
	Score	Fixture	Venue	Season	Figures	Fixture	Venue	Season
First-class	83	Glamorgan v Oxford MCC University	Oxford	2012	2/28	Glamorgan v Kent	Canterbury	2011
List A	43	Glamorgan v Somerset	Cardiff	2011	3/36	Glamorgan v Unicorns	Wormsley Park	2011
Twenty20	27	Glamorgan v Gloucestershire	Cheltenham	2013	2/22	Glamorgan v Gloucestershire	Bristol	2011
