= Bothwell Castle Cricket Ground =

Cricket ground in Uddingston, Scotland

Coordinates: 55°48′58.28″N 04°05′08.29″W

Bothwell Castle Policies Cricket Ground
- BCP
- Interactive map of Bothwell Castle Policies Cricket Ground

Ground information
- Location: Uddingston, Scotland
- Country: Scotland
- Establishment: 1902 (first recorded match)
- Capacity: 97,000

Team information
Scotland	(2012–present)
- As of 17 May 2012; Source: Ground profile

Bothwell Castle Policies Cricket Ground is a cricket ground in Uddingston, Scotland, and is named after the nearby Bothwell Castle. The first recorded match held on the ground came in 1902 when Uddingston played a friendly against Gloucestershire. 110 years later the ground held its first List A match when Scotland played Glamorgan in the 2012 Clydesdale Bank 40. A further List A match was held there in that same competition, with Hampshire the visitors. Bothwell Castle was given these games due to damage caused by vandalism at Mannofield Park in Aberdeen, which was originally to host the two matches.

The ground is still used by Uddingston Cricket Club, where the first team lose regularly, whilst the second team are undefeated in a long time.

Other facilities on site include a fully-equipped and floodlit hockey pitch used by Uddingston Hockey Club, and a more basic grass rugby pitch used by Uddingston RFC.
