= Wilfred Marriott =

English cricketer

Personal information
- Full name: Wilfred William John Marriott
- Born: 11 April 1994 (age 32); Westminster, London, England
- Batting: Right-handed
- Bowling: Right-arm off break

Domestic team information
- Years: Team
- 2013–2014: Oxford MCCU

Career statistics
Competition	First-class
Matches	3
Runs scored	139
Batting average	34.75
100s/50s	–/1
Top score	81
Balls bowled	54
Wickets	0
Bowling average	–
5 wickets in innings	–
10 wickets in match	–
Best bowling	–
Catches/stumpings	–/–
- Source: Cricinfo, 15 July 2020

Wilfred William John Marriott (born 11 April 1994) is an English former first-class cricketer.

The son of Harry Marriott and The Hon. Dinah Lilian Douglas-Home, he was born at Westminster in April 1994. His grandfather was William Douglas Home, the brother of Alec Douglas-Home, the former Prime Minister of the United Kingdom. Marriott was educated at Radley College, before going up to Oxford Brookes University. While studying at Oxford Brookes, he played first-class cricket for Oxford UCCE and MCCU in 2013 and 2014, making three appearances against Worcestershire, Nottinghamshire and Warwickshire. (Note: Oxford MCCU differed from Oxford University Cricket Club in that it was open to students at Oxford Brookes University, whereas Oxford University Cricket Club is exclusively for students of the constituent colleges of the University of Oxford.) He scored 139 runs in his three matches, at an average of 34.75 and with a high score of 81, his only first-class half century.
