= Stewart Walters =

Australian cricketer (born 1983)

Personal information
- Full name: Stewart Jonathan Walters
- Born: 25 June 1983 (age 43); Mornington, Victoria, Australia
- Nickname: Wal
- Height: 6 ft 1 in (1.85 m)
- Batting: Right-handed
- Bowling: Right-arm medium-fast

Domestic team information
- Years: Team
- 2005–2010: Surrey
- 2011–2014: Glamorgan

Career statistics
Competition	FC	LA	T20
Matches	71	67	53
Runs scored	3,411	1,485	830
Batting average	31.00	49.11	27.63
100s/50s	6/15	–/10	–/1
Top score	188	115	53*
Balls bowled	432	165	18
Wickets	3	3	1
Bowling average	81.66	59.66	26.00
5 wickets in innings	–	–	–
10 wickets in match	–	–	–
Best bowling	1/4	1/12	1/9
Catches/stumpings	78/–	22/–	34/–
- Source: , 11 November 2014

Stewart John Walters (born 25 June 1983 in Mornington, Victoria) is an Australian cricketer. He is a right-handed batsman and a right-arm leg break bowler.

== Cricket career ==
=== Early career ===
Walters played his early cricket for Midland-Guildford in the Western Australian Grade Cricket competition. He played under-age and second XI cricket for Western Australia before concentrating on county cricket in England. He also played seven games of Australian rules football for Swan Districts in the West Australian Football League.

=== Surrey ===
Walters played in the 2006 Twenty20 Cup competition for his team, Surrey, though he averaged just 7 runs through the competition. He also played three games in the 2006 County Championship, debuting with a sturdy innings of 41, comprising ten boundaries and one single, from third in the batting order.

Since the opening of the 2007 season, Walters has played several non-Championship matches for the Surrey team, including various Second XI fixtures.

He played in the County Championship game against Essex in July 2009, making his highest first-class score of 111*. Walters is a middle-order batsman and occasional bowler. When Mark Butcher had to miss games because of his knee injury, and then announced his retirement with immediate effect in August 2009, Walters took over the captaincy on a short-term basis.

=== Glamorgan ===
In February 2011, Walters left Surrey to seek pastures new and joined Glamorgan signing a two-year contract. He signed a one-year extension to his contract in September 2012 after scoring Glamorgan's highest individual score of the 2012 season in the County Championship with 159 against Essex at Colchester and was their leading fielder with 13 catches. He was not re-engaged following the 2014 season.

== Career best performances ==
as of 11 November 2014

	Batting				Bowling			
	Score	Fixture	Venue	Season	Score	Fixture	Venue	Season
FC	188	Surrey v Leicestershire	The Oval	2009	1–4	Surrey v Durham	Chester-le-Street	2007
LA	91	Surrey Brown Caps v Northamptonshire Steelbacks	The Oval	2008	1–12	Surrey Brown Caps v Yorkshire Phoenix	Scarborough	2007
T20	53*	Surrey Lions v Glamorgan Dragons	Cardiff	2010	1–9	Surrey Brown Caps v Sussex Sharks	Hove	2009
