= Gurman Randhawa =

English cricketer (born 1992)

Personal information
- Full name: Gurman Singh Randhawa
- Born: 25 January 1992 (age 34); Huddersfield, West Yorkshire, England
- Batting: Left-handed
- Bowling: Slow left-arm orthodox
- Role: Bowler

Domestic team information
- Years: Team
- 2008–2013: Yorkshire (squad no. 25)
- 2014–2015: Shropshire
- 2016: Durham
- 2016: Northumberland
- First-class debut: 27 April 2011 Yorkshire v Durham MCCU
- Last First-class: 26 June 2016 Durham v Sri Lanka A

Career statistics
Competition	First-class
Matches	2
Runs scored	5
Batting average	2.50
100s/50s	0/0
Top score	5
Balls bowled	294
Wickets	3
Bowling average	49.66
5 wickets in innings	0
10 wickets in match	0
Best bowling	2/54
Catches/stumpings	1/–
- Source: Cricinfo, 5 April 2017

Gurman Singh Randhawa (born 25 January 1992) is an English cricketer. He is a slow left-arm orthodox spinner and left-handed batsman.

Randhawa joined Yorkshire in 2008. He has played for the Yorkshire Academy in the Yorkshire ECB County Premier League, and the Yorkshire Second XI in the Second XI Championship, as well as appearing in his debut first-class match for Yorkshire against Durham UCCE in April 2011, scoring five runs in his only innings, and taking two wickets for 62.

Randhawa was named the Yorkshire County Cricket Club Academy Player of the Year, in both 2009 and 2010. He has also played in two Test matches for England Under 19s against Sri Lanka Under 19s, and two One Day Internationals against the same opponents.

He subsequently joined the Minor Counties side, Shropshire. Randhawa has recently joined Durham after a successful trial period.
