= Simon Watkins =

English cricketer (born 1989)

Personal information
- Full name: Simon Joseph Vernon Watkins
- Born: 20 January 1989 (age 37); Wandsworth, London, England
- Batting: Left-handed
- Bowling: Right-arm off break

Domestic team information
- Years: Team
- 2010: Oxford UCCE
- 2007–present: Dorset

Career statistics
Competition	First-class
Matches	1
Runs scored	54
Batting average	54.00
100s/50s	–/–
Top score	46*
Balls bowled	102
Wickets	–
Bowling average	–
5 wickets in innings	–
10 wickets in match	–
Best bowling	–
Catches/stumpings	–/–
- Source: Cricinfo, 2 June 2011

Simon Joseph Vernon Watkins (born 20 January 1989) is an English cricketer. Watkins is a left-handed batsman who bowls right-arm off break. He was born in Wandsworth, London and educated at Corfe Hills School in Broadstone, Dorset.

Waktins made his debut for Dorset in the 2007 MCCA Knockout Trophy against Cornwall. He continues to play Minor counties cricket for Dorset, having also appeared for the county in the Minor Counties Championship.

Proceeding to Oxford Brookes University, Watkins made his only first-class appearance for Oxford UCCE against Middlesex in 2010. In the university first-innings, Watkins scored an unbeaten 46. In their second-innings, he scored 8 runs before being dismissed by Josh Davey. With the ball, he bowled without success, sending down 17 wicket-less overs.

He previously played for the Hampshire Second XI from 2006 to 2009.

In 2013 Watkins travelled to Australia, where he represented the Mentone Cricket Club in the Melbourne metropolitan competition, the Victorian Turf Cricket Association.
