= Morteza Ali =

Afghan cricketer (born 1987)

Morteza Ali (born 1 January 1987) is an Afghan cricketer who made his first-class debut in April 2009, for Oxford MCCU against Worcestershire. He became the third Afghan player, after Mumtaz Habib in 2006 and Mohammad Nabi in 2007, to play in a first-class cricket match in England.
