= Jasper Davies =

English cricketer (born 1992)

Personal information
- Full name: Jasper William Davies
- Born: 3 October 1992 (age 34); Northampton, Northamptonshire, England
- Batting: Right-handed
- Role: Wicket-keeper

Domestic team information
- Years: Team
- 2014: Oxford MCCU
- 2014: Oxfordshire

Career statistics
Competition	First-class
Matches	1
Runs scored	5
Batting average	5.00
100s/50s	–/–
Top score	5
Catches/stumpings	1/–
- Source: Cricinfo, 23 February 2019

Jasper William Davies (born 3 October 1992) is an English former first-class cricketer.

== Education and career ==
Davies was born at Northampton where he was educated at Northampton School for Boys, before going up to Oxford Brookes University. While at Oxford Brookes he made a single appearance in first-class cricket for Oxford MCCU against Warwickshire at Oxford in 2014. (Note: Oxford MCCU differs from Oxford University Cricket Club in that it is open to students at Oxford Brookes University, whereas Oxford University Cricket Club is exclusively for students of the constituent colleges of the University of Oxford.) Playing as a wicket-keeper, Davies batted once during the match, scoring 5 runs in the Oxford MCCU first-innings, before being dismissed by Jonathan Trott. He played minor counties cricket for Oxfordshire in that same season, making an appearance each in the Minor Counties Championship and MCCA Knockout Trophy.
