= Peter Young (cricketer, born 1986) =

English cricketer (born 1986)

Personal information
- Full name: Peter James William Young
- Born: 14 September 1986 (age 40); Hammersmith, London, England
- Height: 5 ft 10 in (1.78 m)
- Batting: Left-handed
- Bowling: Right-arm fast-medium
- Relatives: Ed Young (brother)

Domestic team information
- Years: Team
- 2006–2008: Oxford UCCE

Career statistics
Competition	First-class
Matches	9
Runs scored	280
Batting average	23.33
100s/50s	–/1
Top score	54
Balls bowled	714
Wickets	4
Bowling average	113.50
5 wickets in innings	–
10 wickets in match	–
Best bowling	1/26
Catches/stumpings	4/–
- Source: Cricinfo, 15 July 2020

Peter James William Young (born 14 September 1986) is an English former first-class cricketer.

Young was born at Hammersmith in September 1986. He was educated at Wellington College, before going up to Oxford Brookes University. While studying at Oxford Brookes, he played first-class cricket for Oxford UCCE in 2006–08, making nine appearances. (Note: Oxford UCCE differed from Oxford University Cricket Club in that it was open to students at Oxford Brookes University, whereas Oxford University Cricket Club is exclusively for students of the constituent colleges of the University of Oxford.) Young scored 280 runs in his nine matches, at an average of 23.33 and with a high score of 54, his only first-class half century. With his right-arm medium-fast, he took 4 wickets with best figures of 1 for 26. His brother, Ed, also played first-class cricket.
