= Phil Clark (political scientist) =

Australian political scientist and cricketer (born 1979)

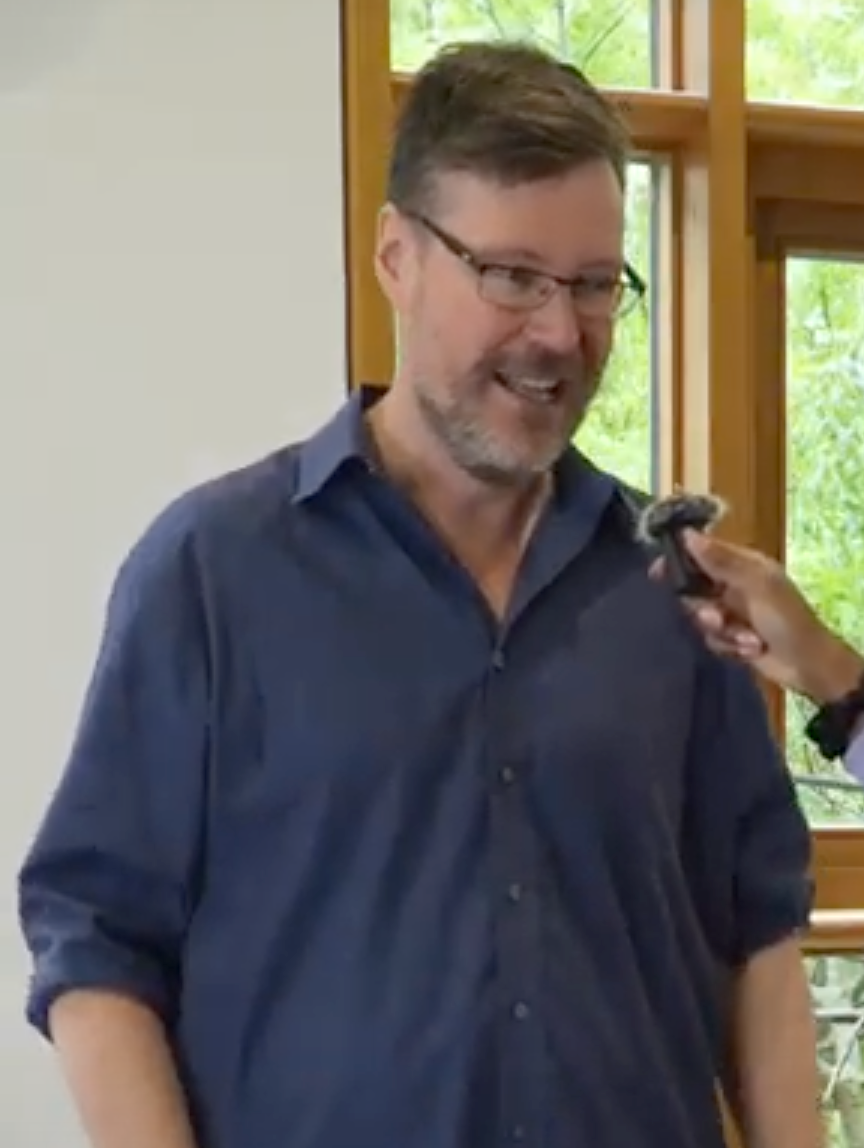
- Being interviewed in a SOAS video in 2025

Personal information
- Full name: Philip Jonathan Clark
- Born: 12 August 1979 (age 47); Khartoum, Khartoum State, Sudan
- Batting: Right-handed
- Bowling: Right-arm medium-fast

Domestic team information
- Years: Team
- 2002: Oxford UCCE

Career statistics
Competition	First-class
Matches	1
Runs scored	2
Batting average	2.00
100s/50s	–/–
Top score	2*
Balls bowled	102
Wickets	1
Bowling average	92.00
5 wickets in innings	–
10 wickets in match	–
Best bowling	1/72
Catches/stumpings	–/–
- Source: Cricinfo, 26 December 2011

Philip Jonathan Clark (born 12 August 1979) is an Australian political scientist and a former cricketer. Clark was a right-handed batsman who bowled right-arm medium-fast.

== Biography ==
Clark, an Australian citizen, was born in Khartoum, Sudan, and obtained his Bachelor of International Studies at Flinders University. While studying for a degree at the University of Oxford, where he was a Rhodes Scholar, Clark made a single first-class appearance for Oxford UCCE against Worcestershire at University Parks in 2002. Clark took a single wicket in Worcestershire's first-innings total of 523/6 declared, that of Anurag Singh to finish with figures of 1/72 from thirteen overs. He was dismissed for a duck by Alamgir Sheriyar in Oxford UCCE's first-innings total of 145, while in Worcestershire's second-innings he bowled four wicketless overs in their total of 159/6. With a target of 538 to chase, Oxford UCCE could only manage 205 all out, with Clark ending that innings not out on 0. Worcestershire won the match by 332 runs. This was his only major appearance for Oxford UCCE.

After his cricket match, Clark later got his Doctor of Philosophy in Politics from Oxford, and he later became a political scientist specialising in war and post-war issues and a Professor of International Politics at the SOAS University of London.

== Publications ==
- The Gacaca Courts, Post-Genocide Justice and Reconciliation: Justice without Lawyers (2010)
- Distant Justice: The Impact of the International Criminal Court on African Politics (2018)
