= Alex Wyatt (cricketer, born 1976) =

Australian cricketer

Personal information
- Full name: Alexander August Wyatt
- Born: 23 June 1976 (age 50); Melbourne, Victoria, Australia
- Batting: Left-handed
- Bowling: Leg break

Domestic team information
- Years: Team
- 2002: Oxford UCCE
- 2002–2004: Oxford University

Career statistics
Competition	First-class
Matches	3
Runs scored	19
Batting average	6.33
100s/50s	–/–
Top score	10*
Balls bowled	414
Wickets	4
Bowling average	55.25
5 wickets in innings	–
10 wickets in match	–
Best bowling	2/22
Catches/stumpings	–/–
- Source: Cricinfo, 15 May 2020

Alexander August Wyatt (born 3 June 1976) is an Australian former first-class cricketer.

Wyatt was born at Melbourne in June 1976. He later studied at the University of Melbourne, before studying in England as a Rhodes Scholar at New College, Oxford. While studying at Oxford, he played first-class cricket, making a single appearance for Oxford UCCE against Northamptonshire at Oxford in 2002, (Note: Oxford UCCE differed from Oxford University Cricket Club in that it was open to students at Oxford Brookes University, whereas Oxford University Cricket Club is exclusively for students of the constituent colleges of the University of Oxford.) in addition to making two first-class appearances for Oxford University against Cambridge University in The University Matches of 2002 and 2004. He took four wickets in his three matches with his leg break bowling, taking three for Oxford University and one for Oxford MCCU.

In 2018, he founded the startup robotics company August Robotics, based in the Chinese city of Shenzhen.
