= Jamie Gnodde =

English cricketer (born 1995)

Personal information
- Full name: James Spencer Drury Gnodde
- Born: 9 November 1995 (age 31); Westminster, London, England
- Batting: Left-handed
- Bowling: Slow left-arm orthodox

Domestic team information
- Years: Team
- 2015–2018: Oxford University
- 2018: Oxford MCCU

Career statistics
Competition	First-class
Matches	5
Runs scored	113
Batting average	18.83
100s/50s	–/1
Top score	54
Balls bowled	492
Wickets	4
Bowling average	52.00
5 wickets in innings	–
10 wickets in match	–
Best bowling	2/35
Catches/stumpings	4/–
- Source: Cricinfo, 3 March 2020

James Spencer Drury Gnodde (born 9 November 1995) is an English former first-class cricketer.

== Early life and career ==
Gnodde was born at Westminster in November 1995. He was educated at Eton College (2009–14), before going up to Pembroke College, Oxford 2014–18). While studying at Oxford he played first-class cricket, making his debut for Oxford University against Cambridge University in The University Match of 2015, with Gnodde also featuring in its 2016, 2017 and 2018 fixtures. In his four first-class matches for Oxford University, he scored 113 runs at an average of 18.83 and a high score of 54. In addition to playing for Oxford University, he also made a single first-class appearance for Oxford MCCU against Kent at Canterbury in 2018. (Note: Oxford MCCU differed from Oxford University Cricket Club in that it was open to students at Oxford Brookes University, whereas Oxford University Cricket Club is exclusively for students of the constituent colleges of the University of Oxford.)
