= Luke Ryan (cricketer) =

English cricketer (born 1988)

Personal information
- Full name: Luke Charles Ryan
- Born: 5 August 1988 (age 38); Welwyn Garden City, Hertfordshire, England
- Batting: Right-handed
- Bowling: Slow left-arm orthodox

Domestic team information
- Years: Team
- 2006–2017: Oxfordshire
- 2007–2009: Oxford UCCE

Career statistics
Competition	First-class
Matches	6
Runs scored	44
Batting average	8.80
100s/50s	–/–
Top score	21
Balls bowled	667
Wickets	8
Bowling average	57.37
5 wickets in innings	–
10 wickets in match	–
Best bowling	3/89
Catches/stumpings	4/–
- Source: Cricinfo, 24 June 2019

Luke Charles Ryan (born 5 August 1988) is an English former first-class cricketer.

Ryan was born at Welwyn Garden City in August 1988. He studied at Oxford Brookes University. While studying at Oxford Brookes he played first-class cricket for Oxford UCCE from 2007–09, making six appearances. Playing as a slow left-arm orthodox bowler, he took 8 wickets at an average of 57.37, with best figures of 3 for 89. With the bat, he scored 44 run with a high score of 21. In addition to playing first-class cricket, Ryan also played minor counties cricket for Oxfordshire between 2006–17, making 44 appearances in the Minor Counties Championship, alongside 43 and four appearances in the MCCA Knockout Trophy and Minor Counties Twenty20 respectively.
