= Jamie Thompson (cricketer) =

English cricketer (born 1991)

Personal information
- Full name: James Scott Thompson
- Born: 11 March 1991 (age 35); Shrewsbury, Shropshire, England
- Height: 6 ft 6 in (1.98 m)
- Batting: Right-handed
- Bowling: Right-arm medium-fast

Domestic team information
- Years: Team
- 2012–2013: Oxford MCCU

Career statistics
| Competition | First-class |
|---|---|
| Matches | 2 |
| Runs scored | 32 |
| Batting average | 8.00 |
| 100s/50s | –/– |
| Top score | 15 |
| Balls bowled | 126 |
| Wickets | 1 |
| Bowling average | 39.00 |
| 5 wickets in innings | – |
| 10 wickets in match | – |
| Best bowling | 1/13 |
| Catches/stumpings | –/– |
- Source: Cricinfo, 15 July 2020

James Scott Thompson (born 11 March 1991) is an English former first-class cricketer.

Jamie was born at Shrewsbury in March 1991. He was educated at Hurstpierpoint College, before going up to Oxford Brookes University. While studying at Oxford Brookes, he made two appearances in first-class cricket for Oxford MCCU, playing against Glamorgan and Worcestershire at Oxford in 2012 and 2013 respectively. (Note: Oxford MCCU differed from Oxford University Cricket Club in that it was open to students at Oxford Brookes University, whereas Oxford University Cricket Club is exclusively for students of the constituent colleges of the University of Oxford.) He scored 32 runs in his two matches, in addition to taking a single wicket, that of Glamorgan's Ben Wright.

After graduating from Oxford Brookes, Thompson became an osteopath. He has worked in his capacity for both Middlesex County Cricket Club and Tottenham Hotspur.
