= Edward Abel =

English cricketer

Personal information
- Born: 30 January 1988 (age 38); Salisbury, Wiltshire, England
- Nickname: Dis
- Batting: Left-handed
- Bowling: Slow left-arm Orthodox

Domestic team information
- Years: Team
- 2008–2010: Oxford UCCE/MCCU
- 2005–2010: Wiltshire

Career statistics
Competition	First-class
Matches	5
Runs scored	154
Batting average	30.80
100s/50s	–/1
Top score	60
Balls bowled	–
Wickets	–
Bowling average	–
5 wickets in innings	–
10 wickets in match	–
Best bowling	–
Catches/stumpings	4/–
- Source: Cricinfo, 26 December 2011

Edward Abel (born 30 January 1988) is an English first-class cricketer. Abel is a left-handed batsman who bowls slow left-arm orthodox. He was born at Salisbury, Wiltshire.

Abel made his debut for Wiltshire in the 2005 Minor Counties Championship against Oxfordshire and in that same season he made his MCCA Knockout Trophy debut against Buckinghamshire. He later attended Oxford Brookes University, while studying there he made his first-class debut for Oxford UCCE against Middlesex. He made two further appearances for Oxford UCCE in 2008 and another in 2009, before making a final first-class appearance for the team, which was now called Oxford MCCU following a change in name for the 2010 season. His final appearance came against Northamptonshire, in which he made his only first-class fifty with a score of 60. In his previous four first-class matches, Abel scored 94 runs at an average of 23.50, with a high score of 27 not out.

Abel continued to play for Wiltshire during this period, making a total of twenty Minor Counties Championship appearances from 2005 to 2010, and from 2005 to 2008 he made eight MCCA Knockout Trophy appearances.
