= Andrew Bones =

English cricketer

Personal information
- Full name: Andrew Stephen Bones
- Born: 18 February 1978 (age 48); Crewe, Cheshire, England
- Batting: Right-handed
- Bowling: Right-arm off break
- Role: Occasional wicket-keeper

Domestic team information
- Years: Team
- 2002: Cheshire
- 2001: Oxford UCCE
- 2000: Oxford Universities

Career statistics
Competition	First-class
Matches	5
Runs scored	27
Batting average	3.37
100s/50s	–/–
Top score	7
Catches/stumpings	2/–
- Source: Cricinfo, 26 December 2011

Andrew Stephen Bones (born 18 February 1978) is a former English cricketer. Bones is a right-handed batsman who bowls right-arm off break and who occasionally fields as a wicket-keeper. He was born at Crewe, Cheshire.

While studying for a degree at the University of Oxford, Bones made his first-class debut for Oxford Universities against Somerset in 2000. He made three further first-class appearances for the team that season, while the following season he made a single first-class appearance for the newly formed Oxford UCCE against Middlesex. Bones struggled in his five first-class matches, scoring just 27 runs at an average of 3.37, with a high score of 7.

In 2002, Bones made a single appearance for Cheshire in the Minor Counties Championship against Herefordshire.
