= Jak Martin =

English cricketer (born 1988)

Personal information
- Full name: Jak Martin
- Born: 7 September 1988 (age 38); Kingston upon Thames, Surrey, England
- Height: 6 ft 0 in (1.83 m)
- Batting: Left-handed
- Bowling: Right-arm medium

Domestic team information
- Years: Team
- 2009–2010: Oxford UCCE/MCCU

Career statistics
Competition	First-class
Matches	6
Runs scored	290
Batting average	32.22
100s/50s	–/2
Top score	81
Catches/stumpings	3/–
- Source: Cricinfo, 14 July 2020

Jak Martin (born 7 September 1988) is an English former first-class cricketer.

Martin was born at Kingston upon Thames in September 1988. He was educated at the Glyn School, before going up to Oxford Brookes University. While studying at Oxford Brookes, Martin played first-class cricket for Oxford UCCE and MCCU in 2009 and 2010, making six appearances. (Note: Oxford UCCE/MCCU differed from Oxford University Cricket Club in that it was open to students at Oxford Brookes University, whereas Oxford University Cricket Club is exclusively for students of the constituent colleges of the University of Oxford.) Martin scored 290 runs in his six matches, at an average of 32.22 and with a high score of 81, one of two half centuries he made.

After graduating from Oxford Brookes, Martin became a schoolteacher. He returned to his former school, where he is head of physical education and games.
