= Peter Wilshaw =

English cricketer (born 1987)

Personal information
- Full name: Peter James Wilshaw
- Born: 15 July 1987 (age 39); Newcastle-under-Lyme, Staffordshire, England
- Batting: Right-handed
- Bowling: Right-arm medium

Domestic team information
- Years: Team
- 2006-2008: Oxford University Centre of Cricketing Excellence
- 2004-present: Staffordshire
- 2002: Nottinghamshire Cricket Board

Career statistics
Competition	FC	LA
Matches	7	2
Runs scored	361	20
Batting average	30.08	10.00
100s/50s	–/3	–/–
Top score	63	20
Balls bowled	138	–
Wickets	2	–
Bowling average	34.00	–
5 wickets in innings	–	–
10 wickets in match	–	–
Best bowling	1/20	–
Catches/stumpings	5/–	2/–
- Source: Cricinfo, 21 November 2010

Peter James Wilshaw (born 15 July 1987) is an English cricketer. Wilshaw is a right-handed batsman who bowls right-arm medium-pace. He was born at Newcastle-under-Lyme, Staffordshire.

Wilshaw represented the Nottinghamshire Cricket Board in a single List A match against Cumberland in the 1st round of the 2003 Cheltenham & Gloucester Trophy which was played in 2002. He was aged just 15 years.

In 2004, he joined Staffordshire, making his Minor Counties Championship debut for the county against Suffolk. From 2004 to present, he has represented the county in 35 Championship matches. The following season he made his MCCA Knockout Trophy debut against Hertfordshire. From 2005 to present, he has represented the county in 21 Trophy matches. In that same season, he played his List A match for Staffordshire against Surrey in the 2005 Cheltenham & Gloucester Trophy. In his 2 career List A matches, he scored 20 runs at a batting average of 10.00, with a high score of 20.

Wilshaw made his debut in first-class cricket for Oxford University against Derbyshire in 2006. From 2006 to 2008, he represented the University in 7 first-class matches, the last of which came against Glamorgan. In his 7 first-class matches, he scored 361 runs at a batting average of 30.08, with 3 half centuries and a high score of 63. In the field he took 5 catches. With the ball he took 2 wickets at a bowling average of 34.00, with best figures of 1/
