= Ben Wright (cricketer) =

English cricketer (born 1987)

Personal information
- Full name: Ben James Wright
- Born: 5 December 1987 (age 38); Preston, Lancashire, England
- Nickname: Bej
- Height: 5 ft 9 in (1.75 m)
- Batting: Right-handed
- Bowling: Right-arm medium-fast
- Role: Batsman

Domestic team information
- Years: Team
- 2006–2015: Glamorgan (squad no. 29)
- FC debut: 20 September 2006 Glamorgan v Gloucestershire
- Last FC: 6 July 2015 Glamorgan v Derbyshire
- LA debut: 9 August 2006 Glamorgan v West Indies A
- Last LA: 27 July 2014 Glamorgan v Surrey

Career statistics
Competition	FC	LA	T20
Matches	89	73	66
Runs scored	3,684	1,332	645
Batting average	27.08	24.66	17.91
100s/50s	6/16	0/7	0/2
Top score	172	79	63*
Balls bowled	276	132	24
Wickets	2	1	1
Bowling average	87.00	126.00	22.00
5 wickets in innings	0	0	0
10 wickets in match	0	0	0
Best bowling	1/14	1/19	1/16
Catches/stumpings	47/–	16/–	15/–
- Source: CricketArchive, 12 April 2016

Ben James Wright (born 5 December 1987) is an English cricketer. He is a right-handed batsman and a right-arm medium-fast bowler. He plays for Glamorgan. He was selected to play in the England Under-19 tour to play against Bangladesh in 2005–06.

He made 72 on his first-class debut in 2006 and in 2007 Wright scored his maiden first-class century against Leicestershire County Cricket Club at Grace Road.

He was selected for the home U19 series and captained the team for a Test in place of the suspended Rory Hamilton-Brown.

Ben Wright also spent the 2008/09, 09/10 and 11/12 seasons in South Australia playing club cricket for Northern Districts.

In September 2015, it was announced that he was leaving Glamorgan, to start a new career outside cricket.
