= Ed Young (cricketer) =

English cricketer

Personal information
- Full name: Edward George Christopher Young
- Born: 21 May 1989 (age 37); Chertsey, Surrey, England
- Batting: Right-handed
- Bowling: slow left-arm orthodox

Domestic team information
- Years: Team
- 2010–2013: Gloucestershire (squad no. 30)
- First-class debut: 11 April 2009 Oxford UCCE v Worcestershire
- List A debut: 24 July 2010 Unicorns v Lancashire

Career statistics
| Competition | FC | LA | T20 |
|---|---|---|---|
| Matches | 22 | 38 | 24 |
| Runs scored | 894 | 271 | 103 |
| Batting average | 33.11 | 13.55 | 6.86 |
| 100s/50s | 1/5 | 0/1 | 0/0 |
| Top score | 133 | 50 | 28 |
| Balls bowled | 1,768 | 1,439 | 462 |
| Wickets | 15 | 31 | 18 |
| Bowling average | 71.53 | 40.19 | 27.83 |
| 5 wickets in innings | 0 | 0 | 0 |
| 10 wickets in match | 0 | 0 | 0 |
| Best bowling | 2/23 | 3/25 | 3/21 |
| Catches/stumpings | 13/0 | 11/0 | 0/0 |
- Source: Cricinfo, 9 November 2019

Edward George Christopher Young (born 1989) is an English cricketer, a right-handed batsman and slow left-arm orthodox bowler who last played for Gloucestershire. He made his first-class debut for Oxford UCCE against Worcestershire in April 2009. Young signed a two-year development contract with Gloucestershire in August 2010 whilst also studying at Oxford Brookes University. Young's older brother, Peter was also a cricketer and also played nine first-class games for Oxford UCCE.

== County career ==
Born 21 May 1989, Chertsey, Surrey, England, Young made his debut for Oxford UCCE in a 3-day match against Worcestershire. The game was affected by rain with no play on day one. Due to the weather Young bowled only 3 overs for 22 runs and was 0 not out from one ball in a drawn match. Young made his highest first-class score of 133 runs from 179 balls against Lancashire in April 2011. In April 2011 Young scored 80 runs from 111 balls for Oxford against Nottinghamshire in a drawn match, he also took one wicket in the match that of Andy Carter. In late May 2011, Young played for Gloucestershire in a first-class match against Essex. He scored 51 not out in 126 balls in a drawn match at Bristol. In June 2011, Young took 2 wickets for 32 runs in his 4 overs in a Twenty20 loss against Essex. Young also starred with the ball in a Twenty20 match against Hampshire in June 2011. He conceded only 14 runs and took 2 wickets in his maximum 4 overs in a 9 run loss.

In the winter of 2011, Young was part of Darren Lehmann's cricket academy in Adelaide. He returned from this experience to take a more active part in the County Championship during the 2012 season.

Young played in just one County Championship game in 2013 and was consequently released by Gloucestershire on 8 October 2013.

== Career best performances ==
as of 1 October 2013

| | Batting | | | | Bowling | | | |
| | Score | Fixture | Venue | Season | Score | Fixture | Venue | Season |
|---|---|---|---|---|---|---|---|---|
| FC | 133 | Oxford MCCU v Lancashire | Oxford | 2011 | 2–23 | Gloucestershire v Kent | Canterbury | 2012 |
| LA | 50 | Gloucestershire Gladiators v Nottinghamshire Outlaws | Nottingham | 2011 | 3–25 | Gloucestershire Gladiators v Lancashire Lightning | Bristol | 2012 |
| T20 | 28 | Gloucestershire Gladiators v Surrey Lions | The Oval | 2011 | 3-21 | Gloucestershire Gladiators v Glamorgan | Cheltenham | 2013 |
