= Freddie John =

Welsh cricketer

Personal information
- Full name: Frederick Robert Harold John
- Born: 6 September 1991 (age 35); Newport, Monmouthshire, Wales
- Height: 6 ft 5 in (1.96 m)
- Batting: Right-handed
- Role: Wicket-keeper

Domestic team information
- Years: Team
- 2012: Oxford MCCU

Career statistics
Competition	First-class
Matches	2
Runs scored	55
Batting average	27.50
100s/50s	–/–
Top score	27
Catches/stumpings	3/–
- Source: Cricinfo, 14 July 2020

Frederick Robert Harold John (born 6 September 1991) is a Welsh former first-class cricketer.

John was born at Newport in September 1991. He was educated at Clifton College, before going up to Oxford Brookes University. While studying at Oxford Brookes, John made two appearances in first-class cricket for Oxford MCCU against Glamorgan and Worcestershire in 2012. (Note: Oxford MCCU differed from Oxford University Cricket Club in that it was open to students at Oxford Brookes University, whereas Oxford University Cricket Club is exclusively for students of the constituent colleges of the University of Oxford.) Playing as a wicket-keeper, he scored 55 runs at an average of 27.50 and with a high score of 27.
