= 2012 Clydesdale Bank 40 =

- Dates: 6 May – 15 September 2012
- Administrator: England and Wales Cricket Board
- Cricket format: Limited overs cricket (40 overs)
- Tournament format(s): Group stage and knockout
- Champions: Hampshire
- Participants: 21
- Matches: 129
- Most runs: 598 Michael Carberry (Hampshire Royals)
- Most wickets: 21 Ajmal Shahzad (Lancashire Lightning)

The 2012 Clydesdale Bank 40 tournament was the third season of the ECB 40 limited overs cricket competition for the English and Welsh first-class counties. In addition to the 18 counties, Scotland and the Netherlands took part, as well as the Unicorns, a team of players who did not have first-class contracts.

The competition consisted of three groups of seven teams, from which the top team from each group, plus the best second-placed team, progressed to the semi-finals. The groups were allocated randomly.

== Competition format ==
Group A	Group B	Group C
Essex Eagles	Durham Dynamos	Derbyshire Falcons
Gloucestershire Gladiators	Hampshire Royals	Kent Spitfires
Lancashire Lightning	Nottinghamshire Outlaws	Northamptonshire Steelbacks
Leicestershire Foxes	Scottish Saltires	Sussex Sharks
Middlesex Panthers	Somerset	Unicorns
Netherlands	Surrey Lions	Warwickshire Bears
Worcestershire Royals	Welsh Dragons	Yorkshire Carnegie

== Group stage ==
=== Group A ===
==== Table ====
Pos	Team	Pld	W	L	T	NR	Pts	NRR
1	Lancashire Lightning	12	9	2	0	1	19	0.050
2	Middlesex Panthers	12	6	3	1	2	15	0.778
3	Gloucestershire Gladiators	12	5	5	0	2	12	0.995
4	Netherlands	12	5	6	0	1	11	−0.910
5	Essex Eagles	12	4	6	0	2	10	−0.185
6	Leicestershire Foxes	12	3	6	0	3	9	−0.732
7	Worcestershire Royals	12	3	7	1	1	8	−0.011

==== Results ====
	Essex Eagles	Gloucestershire Gladiators	Lancashire Lightning	Leicestershire Foxes	Middlesex Panthers	Netherlands	Worcestershire Royals
Essex Eagles		Essex; 8 wickets	Lancashire; 8 wickets	Essex; 7 wickets	Middlesex; 9 wickets	Essex; 117 runs	Worcestershire; 7 wickets
Gloucestershire Gladiators	No result		Lancashire; 18 runs	Gloucestershire; 164 runs	Middlesex; 10 wickets	Netherlands; 1 run	Gloucestershire; 4 wickets
Lancashire Lightning	Lancashire; 28 runs	Lancashire; 4 wickets		Lancashire; 5 runs	Lancashire; 7 wickets (D/L)	Lancashire; 9 wickets	Lancashire; 12 runs (D/L)
Leicestershire Foxes	No result	No result	Lancashire; 6 wickets		Middlesex; 31 runs	Netherlands; 43 runs	Leicestershire; 4 runs
Middlesex Panthers	Middlesex; 54 runs (D/L)	Gloucestershire; 5 wickets	Middlesex; 167 runs	No result		No result	Match tied
Netherlands	Netherlands; 5 wickets	Gloucestershire; 90 runs (D/L)	Netherlands; 1 wicket	Leicestershire; 33 runs	Middlesex; 8 wickets		Worcestershire; 9 wickets (D/L)
Worcestershire Royals	Essex; 25 runs	Gloucestershire; 109 runs	No result	Leicestershire; 2 wickets	Worcestershire; 56 runs	Netherlands; 9 wickets (D/L)	

Home team win	Away team win	Match abandoned

==== Fixtures ====
6 May
Scorecard

Netherlands; 239/6 (40 overs)	v	Gloucestershire Gladiators (H); 238/8 (40 overs)

Netherlands won by 1 run
County Ground, Bristol

6 May
Scorecard

Lancashire Lightning (H); 296/3 (40 overs)	v	Leicestershire Foxes; 291/7 (40 overs)

Lancashire won by 5 runs
Old Trafford, Manchester

7 May
Scorecard

Leicestershire Foxes (H)	v	Essex Eagles

Match abandoned
Grace Road, Leicester

7 May
Scorecard

Middlesex Panthers (H); 157/8 (26 overs)	v	Gloucestershire Gladiators; 161/5 (22.2 overs)

Gloucestershire won by 5 wickets
Lord's, London

7 May
Scorecard

Worcestershire Royals (H); 172/4 (27 overs)	v	Netherlands; 139/1 (16.5 overs)

Netherlands won by 9 wickets (D/L)
Chester Road, Kidderminster

13 May
Scorecard

Essex Eagles (H); 190/9 (40 overs)	v	Worcestershire Royals; 191/3 (33.5 overs)

Worcestershire won by 7 wickets
County Ground, Chelmsford

13 May
Scorecard

Gloucestershire Gladiators (H); 294/6 (40 overs)	v	Leicestershire Foxes; 130 (30.3 overs)

Gloucestershire won by 164 runs
County Ground, Bristol

14 May
Scorecard

Netherlands (H); 212/9 (40 overs)	v	Middlesex Panthers; 213/2 (37.2 overs)

Middlesex won by 8 wickets
Sportpark Westvliet, The Hague

20 May
Scorecard

Lancashire Lightning (H); 258/9 (40 overs)	v	Essex Eagles; 230 (37.3 overs)

Lancashire won by 28 runs
Old Trafford, Manchester

20 May
Scorecard

Middlesex Panthers; 241/5 (40 overs)	v	Leicestershire Foxes (H); 210 (38.4 overs)

Middlesex won by 31 runs
Grace Road, Leicester

27 May
Scorecard

Worcestershire Royals (H); 235/5 (40 overs)	v	Middlesex Panthers; 179 (34.3 overs)

Worcestershire won by 56 runs
New Road, Worcester

28 May
Scorecard

Lancashire Lightning; 236 (39.4 overs)	v	Netherlands (H); 237/9 (39.4 overs)

Netherlands won by 1 wicket
Sportpark Thurlede, Schiedam

29 May
Scorecard

Essex Eagles; 112 (33.3 overs)	v	Netherlands (H); 113/5 (22.1 overs)

Netherlands won by 5 wickets
Sportpark Thurlede, Schiedam

3 June
Scorecard

Middlesex Panthers (H)	v	Netherlands

Match abandoned
Lord's, London

4 June
Scorecard

Gloucestershire Gladiators; 224/5 (40 overs)	v	Essex Eagles (H); 225/2 (36.5 overs)

Essex won by 8 wickets
County Ground, Chelmsford

4 June
Scorecard

Netherlands; 304/3 (40 overs)	v	Leicestershire Foxes (H); 261/9 (40 overs)

Netherlands won by 43 runs
Grace Road, Leicester

5 June
Scorecard

Lancashire Lightning (H); 259/9 (40 overs)	v	Worcestershire Royals; 95/1 (14.1 overs)

Lancashire won by 12 runs (D/L)
Old Trafford, Manchester

8 June
Scorecard

Netherlands (H); 57 (23.2 overs)	v	Worcestershire Royals; 61/1 (13.1 overs)

Worcestershire won by 9 wickets (D/L)
Sportpark Westvliet, The Hague

10 June
Scorecard

Middlesex Panthers (H); 350/6 (40 overs)	v	Lancashire Lightning; 183 (35 overs)

Middlesex won by 167 runs
Lord's, London

10 June
Scorecard

Gloucestershire Gladiators; 238/6 (40 overs)	v	Worcestershire Royals (H); 129 (39.1 overs)

Gloucestershire won by 109 runs
New Road, Worcester

11 July
Scorecard

Netherlands; 175 (32.1 overs)	v	Leicestershire Foxes; 208/7 (36 overs)

Leicestershire won by 33 runs
VRA Cricket Ground, Amstelveen

14 July
Scorecard

Leicestershire Foxes (H); 217/6 (31 overs)	v	Worcestershire Royals; 214/5 (31 overs)

Leicestershire won by 4 wickets
Grace Road, Leicester

15 July
Scorecard

Gloucestershire Gladiators (H)	v	Essex Eagles

Match abandoned
College Ground, Cheltenham

15 July
Scorecard

Middlesex Panthers (H)	v	Leicestershire Foxes

Match abandoned
Uxbridge Cricket Club Ground, Uxbridge

16 July (D/N)
Scorecard

Lancashire Lightning (H); 97/3 (13.2 overs)	v	Middlesex Panthers; 97/8 (16overs)

Lancashire won by 7 wickets (D/L)
Old Trafford, Manchester

17 July
Scorecard

Gloucestershire Gladiators (H); 145/6 (27.1 overs)	v	Worcestershire Royals; 144/7 (40 overs)

Gloucestershire won by 4 wickets
College Ground, Cheltenham

18 July (D/N)
Scorecard

Essex Eagles (H); 146/7 (25 overs)	v	Middlesex Panthers; 148/1 (22.3 overs)

Middlesex won by 9 wickets
County Ground, Chelmsford

22 July
Scorecard

Gloucestershire Gladiators (H); 214/9 (40 overs)	v	Middlesex Panthers; 218/0 (30.3 overs)

Middlesex won by 10 wickets
College Ground, Cheltenham

22 July
Scorecard

Leicestershire Foxes (H); 218/8 (40 overs)	v	Lancashire Lightning; 220/4 (35.4 overs)

Lancashire won by 6 wickets
Grace Road, Leicester

27 July
Scorecard

Netherlands (H); 146 (22 overs)	v	Gloucestershire Gladiators; 290/6 (40 overs)

Gloucestershire won by 90 runs (D/L)
VRA Cricket Ground, Amstelveen

29 July
Scorecard

Essex Eagles; 269/4 (40 overs)	v	Worcestershire Royals (H); 244/8 (40 overs)

Essex won by 25 runs
New Road, Worcester

30 July (D/N)
Scorecard

Gloucestershire Gladiators; 184/7 (40 overs)	v	Lancashire Lightning (H); 187/6 (39.1 overs)

Lancashire won by 4 wickets
Old Trafford, Manchester

5 August
Scorecard

Leicestershire Foxes; 151/7 (25 overs)	v	Essex Eagles (H); 154/3 (23.3 overs)

Essex won by 7 wickets
County Ground, Chelmsford

5 August
Scorecard

Middlesex Panthers (H); 229/4 (36 overs)	v	Worcestershire Royals; 229/7 (36 overs)

Match tied
Uxbridge Cricket Club Ground, Uxbridge

12 August
Scorecard

Netherlands; 68 (20.5/27 overs)	v	Lancashire Lightning (H); 69/1 (16.3/27 overs)

Lancashire won by 9 wickets
Old Trafford, Manchester

19 August
Scorecard

Essex Eagles (H); 314/8 (40 overs)	v	Netherlands; 197 (32.2 overs)

Essex won by 117 runs
Castle Park Cricket Ground, Colchester

19 August
Scorecard

Lancashire Lightning; 182/9 (40 overs)	v	Gloucestershire Gladiators (H); 164 (35.1 overs)

Lancashire won by 18 runs
County Ground, Bristol

19 August
Scorecard

Worcestershire Royals (H); 223/9 (40 overs)	v	Leicestershire Foxes; 224/8 (39 overs)

Leicestershire won by 2 wickets
New Road, Worcester

23 August (D/N)
Scorecard

Essex Eagles (H); 186 (38.1 overs)	v	Lancashire Lightning; 187/2 (36.3 overs)

Lancashire won by 8 wickets
County Ground, Chelmsford

27 August
Scorecard

Leicestershire Foxes (H); 264 (38 overs)	v	Gloucestershire Gladiators; 19/1 (4 overs)

Match abandoned
Grace Road, Leicester

27 August
Scorecard

Middlesex Panthers (H); 288 (40 overs)	v	Essex Eagles; 198/7 (35.1/35.1 overs)

Middlesex won by 54 runs (D/L)
Lord's, London

27 August
Scorecard

Lancashire Lightning; 324/4 (37/37 overs)	v	Worcestershire Royals (H)

Match abandoned
New Road, Worcester

=== Group B ===
==== Table ====
Pos	Team	Pld	W	L	T	NR	Pts	NRR
1	Hampshire Royals	12	7	3	0	2	16	0.754
2	Surrey Lions	12	6	3	0	3	15	0.466
3	Somerset	12	6	4	0	2	14	0.385
4	Nottinghamshire Outlaws	12	6	5	0	1	13	0.101
5	Durham Dynamos	12	5	5	0	2	12	0.262
6	Welsh Dragons	12	3	6	0	3	9	−0.971
7	Scottish Saltires	12	1	8	0	3	5	−1.359

==== Results ====
	Durham Dynamos	Hampshire Royals	Nottinghamshire Outlaws	Scottish Saltires	Somerset	Surrey Lions	Welsh Dragons
Durham Dynamos		No result	Durham; 91 runs	Durham; 8 wickets	Durham; 14 runs	Durham; 142 runs	Durham; 59 runs
Hampshire Royals	Hampshire; 4 wickets		Nottinghamshire; 12 runs	Hampshire; 6 wickets	Somerset; 50 runs	Hampshire; 4 wickets	Hampshire; 48 runs (D/L)
Nottinghamshire Outlaws	Nottinghamshire; 43 runs	Nottinghamshire; 6 wickets		Nottinghamshire; 88 runs	Nottinghamshire; 5 wickets	Surrey; 4 wickets	No result
Scottish Saltires	No result	Hampshire; 89 runs	Scotland; 18 runs (D/L)		Somerset; 53 runs (D/L)	Surrey; 18 runs (D/L)	No result
Somerset	Somerset; 8 wickets	Hampshire; 9 wickets	Somerset; 5 wickets	Somerset; 60 runs		No result	Somerset; 3 wickets
Surrey Lions	Surrey; 60 runs	No result	Nottinghamshire; 5 wickets	No result	Surrey; 105 runs		Surrey; 93 runs
Welsh Dragons	Welsh Dragons; 15 runs	Hampshire; 107 runs	Welsh Dragons; 2 runs (D/L)	Welsh Dragons; 8 wickets	No result	Surrey; 57 runs (D/L)	

Home team win	Away team win	Match abandoned

==== Fixtures ====
4 May (D/N)
Scorecard

Surrey Lions (H); 295/6 (40 overs)	v	Somerset; 190 (37.1 overs)

Surrey won by 105 runs
The Oval, London

6 May
Scorecard

Surrey Lions; 187/7 (40 overs)	v	Scottish Saltires (H); 118/6 (29 overs)

Surrey won by 18 runs (D/L)
The Grange, Edinburgh

7 May
Scorecard

Welsh Dragons; 173/7 (34 overs)	v	Hampshire Royals (H); 151/2 (23.5 overs)

Hampshire won by 48 runs (D/L)
The Rose Bowl, Southampton

7 May
Scorecard

Nottinghamshire Outlaws; 219/7 (40 overs)	v	Scottish Saltires (H); 108/0 (23 overs)

Scotland won by 18 runs (D/L)
The Grange, Edinburgh

13 May
Scorecard

Durham Dynamos (H); 222/9 (40 overs)	v	Somerset; 208 (39.3 overs)

Durham won by 14 runs
Riverside Ground, Chester-le-Street

13 May
Scorecard

Scottish Saltires (H); 25/1 (6.5 overs)	v	Welsh Dragons

Match abandoned
Bothwell Castle, Uddingston

20 May
Scorecard

Hampshire Royals; 220 (39.4 overs)	v	Scottish Saltires (H); 131 (33 overs)

Hampshire won by 89 runs
Bothwell Castle, Uddingston

20 May
Scorecard

Surrey Lions (H); 221/7 (40 overs)	v	Durham Dynamos; 161 (35.4 overs)

Surrey won by 60 runs
The Oval, London

27 May
Scorecard

Scottish Saltires; 258/4 (40 overs)	v	Durham Dynamos (H); 259/2 (33.3 overs)

Durham won by 8 wickets
Riverside Ground, Chester-le-Street

27 May
Scorecard

Somerset (H); 212/9 (40 overs)	v	Hampshire Royals; 216/1 (28.2 overs)

Hampshire won by 9 wickets
County Ground, Taunton

31 May (D/N)
Scorecard

Nottinghamshire Outlaws; 277/4 (40 overs)	v	Hampshire Royals (H); 265 (39.5 overs)

Nottinghamshire won by 12 runs
The Rose Bowl, Southampton

2 June
Scorecard

Surrey Lions; 173/9 (40 overs)	v	Welsh Dragons (H); 107/9 (26 overs)

Surrey won by 57 runs (D/L)
Sophia Gardens, Cardiff

3 June
Scorecard

Durham Dynamos (H); 310/4 (40 overs)	v	Nottinghamshire Outlaws; 219 (37.5 overs)

Durham won by 91 runs
Riverside Ground, Chester-le-Street

3 June
Scorecard

Surrey Lions (H); 76/1 (8 overs)	v	Hampshire Royals

Match abandoned
The Oval, London

4 June
Scorecard

Scottish Saltires; 230/9 (40 overs)	v	Hampshire Royals (H); 234/4 (36.1 overs)

Hampshire won by 6 wickets
The Rose Bowl, Southampton

4 June
Scorecard

Somerset; 205/8 (40 overs)	v	Nottinghamshire Outlaws (H); 209/5 (36.4 overs)

Nottinghamshire won by 5 wickets
Trent Bridge, Nottingham

5 June
Scorecard

Scottish Saltires; 124/4 (23 overs)	v	Surrey Lions (H)

Match abandoned
The Oval, London

10 June
Scorecard

Welsh Dragons (H); 163 (34.3 overs)	v	Durham Dynamos; 148 (37.5 overs)

Welsh Dragons won by 15 runs
Penrhyn Avenue, Rhos-on-Sea

12 July (D/N)
Scorecard

Welsh Dragons (H)	v	Somerset

Match abandoned
Sophia Gardens, Cardiff

15 July
Scorecard

Hampshire Royals (H); 201/6 (38.2 overs)	v	Durham Dynamos; 200/7 (40 overs)

Hampshire won by 4 wickets
The Rose Bowl, Southampton

15 July
Scorecard

Somerset (H); 206 (38.4 overs)	v	Scottish Saltires; 146 (31.4)

Somerset won by 60 runs
County Ground, Taunton

15 July
Scorecard

Surrey Lions (H); 123 (33.4)	v	Nottinghamshire Outlaws; 124/5 (30.3 overs)

Nottinghamshire won by 5 wickets
Woodbridge Road, Guildford

17 July (D/N)
Scorecard

Nottinghamshire Outlaws (H); 231/4 (37.1 overs)	v	Hampshire Royals; 230/7 (40 overs)

Nottinghamshire won by 6 wickets
Trent Bridge, Nottingham

22 July
Scorecard

Nottinghamshire Outlaws (H); 265/5 (40 overs)	v	Scottish Saltires; 177 (36 overs)

Nottinghamshire won by 88 runs
Trent Bridge, Nottingham

22 July
Scorecard

Somerset (H); 149/2 (20.2 overs)	v	Durham Dynamos; 147 (34 overs)

Somerset won by 8 wickets
County Ground, Taunton

28 July
Scorecard

Welsh Dragons; 250/9 (40 overs)	v	Somerset (H); 251/7 (37.5 overs)

Somerset won by 3 wickets
County Ground, Taunton

29 July
Scorecard

Scottish Saltires; 151/9 (40 overs)	v	Welsh Dragons (H); 154/2 (28 overs)

Welsh Dragons won by 8 wickets
Sophia Gardens, Cardiff

1 August (D/N)
Scorecard

Nottinghamshire Outlaws (H); 149 (38 overs)	v	Surrey Lions; 151/6 (36.1 overs)

Surrey won by 4 wickets
Trent Bridge, Nottingham

5 August
Scorecard

Welsh Dragons (H); 181/8 (40 overs)	v	Nottinghamshire Outlaws; 107/5 (21 overs)

Welsh Dragons won by 2 runs (D/L)
St. Helen's, Swansea

5 August
Scorecard

Scottish Saltires (H)	v	Durham Dynamos

Match abandoned
The Grange, Edinburgh

10 August (D/N)
Scorecard

Hampshire Royals; 227 (40 overs)	v	Welsh Dragons (H); 120 (32.5 overs)

Hampshire won by 107 runs
Sophia Gardens, Cardiff

11 August
Scorecard

Durham Dynamos (H); 298/9 (40 overs)	v	Surrey Lions; 156 (29.1 overs)

Durham won by 142 runs
Riverside Ground, Chester-le-Street

12 August
Scorecard

Durham Dynamos (H); 307/2 (40 overs)	v	Welsh Dragons; 248 (36.2 overs)

Durham won by 59 runs
Riverside Ground, Chester-le-Street

12 August
Scorecard

Nottinghamshire Outlaws; 206/9 (40 overs)	v	Somerset (H); 209/5 (29.2 overs)

Somerset won by 5 wickets
County Ground, Taunton

14 August (D/N)
Scorecard

Somerset; 228/8 (40 overs)	v	Hampshire Royals (H); 178 (36 overs)

Somerset won by 50 runs
The Rose Bowl, Southampton

19 August
Scorecard

Surrey Lions; 175/9 (40 overs)	v	Hampshire Royals (H); 179/6 (38.1 overs)

Hampshire won by 4 wickets
The Rose Bowl, Southampton

19 August
Scorecard

Nottinghamshire Outlaws (H); 294/8 (40 overs)	v	Durham Dynamos; 251 (38.3 overs)

Nottinghamshire won by 43 runs
Trent Bridge, Nottingham

19 August
Scorecard

Scottish Saltires (H); 163 (37.5 overs)	v	Somerset; 133/3 (22.4 overs)

Somerset won by 53 runs (D/L)
The Grange, Edinburgh

21 August (D/N)
Scorecard

Surrey Lions (H); 219/9 (40 overs)	v	Welsh Dragons; 126 (26.3 overs)

Surrey won by 93 runs
The Oval, London

27 August
Scorecard

Hampshire Royals; 52/1 (6/18 overs)	v	Durham Dynamos (H)

Match abandoned
Riverside Ground, Chester-le-Street

27 August
Scorecard

Nottinghamshire Outlaws (H); 264/6 (40 overs)	v	Welsh Dragons; 20/0 (5.3/38 overs)

Match abandoned
Trent Bridge, Nottingham

27 August
Scorecard

Surrey Lions; 29/1 (4.3/39 overs)	v	Somerset (H)

Match abandoned
County Ground, Taunton

=== Group C ===
==== Table ====
Pos	Team	Pld	W	L	T	NR	Pts	NRR
1	Sussex Sharks	12	7	1	0	4	18	1.012
2	Warwickshire Bears	12	8	3	0	1	17	0.660
3	Kent Spitfires	12	7	2	0	3	17	0.870
4	Derbyshire Falcons	12	4	5	0	3	11	−0.438
5	Yorkshire Carnegie	12	4	7	0	1	9	0.006
6	Northamptonshire Steelbacks	12	1	6	0	5	7	−0.568
7	Unicorns	12	1	8	0	3	5	−1.545

==== Results ====
	Derbyshire Falcons	Kent Spitfires	Northamptonshire Steelbacks	Sussex Sharks	Unicorns	Warwickshire Bears	Yorkshire Carnegie
Derbyshire Falcons		Kent; 9 wickets (D/L)	No result	Derbyshire; 6 wickets	Derbyshire; 35 runs	Warwickshire; 105 runs	Yorkshire; 3 wickets
Kent Spitfires	Kent; 111 runs		No result	Sussex; 9 wickets	Unicorns; 4 wickets	Kent; 10 wickets (D/L)	Kent; 30 runs
Northamptonshire Steelbacks	No result	Kent; 5 wickets		Sussex; 12 runs	No result	Northamptonshire; 8 wickets	Yorkshire; 69 runs
Sussex Sharks	No result	No result	Sussex; 8 wickets		Sussex; 144 runs	Sussex; 17 runs	Sussex; 4 wickets
Unicorns	Derbyshire; 129 runs	No result	Northamptonshire; 8 wickets	No result		Warwickshire; 10 wickets	Yorkshire; 8 wickets
Warwickshire Bears	Warwickshire; 9 wickets	Kent; 6 wickets	Warwickshire; 6 wickets	No result	Warwickshire; 60 runs		Warwickshire; 3 wickets (D/L)
Yorkshire Carnegie	Yorkshire; 7 wickets	Kent; 4 wickets	No result	Sussex; 3 wickets	Yorkshire; 5 wickets (D/L)	Warwickshire; 55 runs (D/L)	

Home team win	Away team win	Match abandoned

==== Fixtures ====
6 May
Scorecard

Derbyshire Falcons; 287/3 (40 overs)	v	Unicorns (H); 158/9 (40 overs)

Derbyshire won by 129 runs
Sir Paul Getty's Ground, Wormsley

6 May
Scorecard

Northamptonshire Steelbacks; 209/7 (40 overs)	v	Warwickshire Bears (H); 212/4 (37.3 overs)

Warwickshire won by 6 wickets
Edgbaston, Birmingham

6 May
Scorecard

Yorkshire Carnegie (H); 175/9 (40 overs)	v	Kent Spitfires; 176/6 (39.2 overs)

Kent won by 4 wickets
Headingley, Leeds

7 May
Scorecard

Unicorns; 79/3 (10 overs)	v	Northamptonshire Steelbacks (H); 16/1 (1.4/10 overs)

Match abandoned
County Ground, Northampton

13 May
Scorecard

Sussex Sharks (H); 291/3 (40 overs)	v	Unicorns; 147/9 (40 overs)

Sussex won by 144 runs
County Ground, Hove

13 May
Scorecard

Derbyshire Falcons; 122 (31.1/40 overs)	v	Warwickshire Bears (H); 125/1 (24.3/40 overs)

Warwickshire won by 9 wickets
Edgbaston, Birmingham

20 May
Scorecard

Kent Spitfires (H); 165 (39.5/40 overs)	v	Unicorns; 166/6 (39/40 overs)

Unicorns won by 4 wickets
St Lawrence Ground, Canterbury

20 May
Scorecard

Sussex Sharks; 180 (35.4/40 overs)	v	Northamptonshire Steelbacks (H); 168/7 (40 overs)

Sussex won by 12 runs
County Ground, Northampton

20 May
Scorecard

Derbyshire Falcons; 219/8 (40 overs)	v	Yorkshire Carnegie (H); 223/3 (37.4/40 overs)

Yorkshire won by 7 wickets
Headingley, Leeds

24 May
Scorecard

Yorkshire Carnegie; 238/9 (40 overs)	v	Sussex Sharks (H); 240/6 (33.5/40 overs)

Sussex won by 4 wickets
County Ground, Hove

27 May
Scorecard

Northamptonshire Steelbacks (H); 148 (36.2/40 overs)	v	Warwickshire Bears; 149/2 (32.4/40 overs)

Warwickshire won by 8 wickets
County Ground, Northampton

27 May
Scorecard

Unicorns (H); 184 (40 overs)	v	Yorkshire Carnegie; 186/2 (32.2/40 overs)

Yorkshire won by 8 wickets
North Marine Road Ground, Scarborough

1 June
Scorecard

Warwickshire Bears; 94/7 (26.3 overs)	v	Kent Spitfires (H); 96/0 (16.3/26 overs)

Kent won by 10 wickets (D/L)
St Lawrence Ground, Canterbury

3 June
Scorecard

Unicorns (H)	v	Sussex Sharks

Match abandoned
Garons Park, Southend-on-Sea

3 June
Scorecard

Yorkshire Carnegie (H)	v	Northamptonshire Steelbacks

Match abandoned
Headingley, Leeds

4 June
Scorecard

Warwickshire Bears; 242/6 (40 overs)	v	Derbyshire Falcons (H); 137 (32.1/40 overs)

Warwickshire won by 105 runs
County Ground, Derby

5 June
Scorecard

Unicorns (H); 177/8 (40 overs)	v	Kent Spitfires; 9/0 (3/40 overs)

Match abandoned
Garons Park, Southend-on-Sea

10 June
Scorecard

Northamptonshire Steelbacks; 168/5 (32 overs)	v	Kent Spitfires (H); 6/0 (1/18 overs)

Match abandoned
Nevill Ground, Tunbridge Wells

10 June
Scorecard

Sussex Sharks (H); 111/5 (24/40 overs)	v	Derbyshire Falcons

Match abandoned
Cricketfield Road Ground, Horsham

11 June
Scorecard

Warwickshire Bears (H)	v	Sussex Sharks

Match abandoned
Edgbaston, Birmingham

13 July
Scorecard

Northamptonshire Steelbacks (H); 220/8 (40 overs)	v	Derbyshire Falcons; 19/2 (6.1/40 overs)

Match abandoned
County Ground, Northampton

15 July
Scorecard

Derbyshire Falcons (H); 235/7 (40 overs)	v	Unicorns; 200 (38.5/40 overs)

Derbyshire won by 35 runs
Queen's Park, Chesterfield

16 July
Scorecard

Sussex Sharks (H)	v	Kent Spitfires

Match abandoned
Arundel Castle Cricket Ground, Arundel

22 July
Scorecard

Yorkshire Carnegie; 238/7 (40 overs)	v	Derbyshire Falcons (H); 239/7 (37.4/40 overs)

Derbyshire won by 3 wickets
Queen's Park, Chesterfield

22 July
Scorecard

Northamptonshire Steelbacks; 129 (39.5/40 overs)	v	Sussex Sharks (H); 130/2 (30.3/40 overs)

Sussex won by 8 wickets
Arundel Castle Cricket Ground, Arundel

22 July
Scorecard

Warwickshire Bears (H); 228/9 (40 overs)	v	Unicorns; 168/7 (40 overs)

Warwickshire won by 60 runs
Edgbaston, Birmingham

29 July
Scorecard

Unicorns (H); 163/8 (34 overs)	v	Northamptonshire Steelbacks; 167/2 (26.2/34 overs)

Northamptonshire won by 8 wickets
Sir Paul Getty's Ground, Wormsley

31 July
Scorecard

Derbyshire Falcons (H); 62/5 (14 overs)	v	Kent Spitfires; 68/1 (10.5/14 overs)

Kent won by 9 wickets (D/L)
County Ground, Derby

7 August
Scorecard

Yorkshire Carnegie; 213/8 (34 overs)	v	Warwickshire Bears (H); 239/7 (33.2/34 overs)

Warwickshire won by 3 wickets (D/L)
Edgbaston, Birmingham

8 August
Scorecard

Sussex Sharks; 167 (37.2/40 overs)	v	Derbyshire Falcons (H); 170/4 (37.4/34 overs)

Derbyshire won by 6 wickets
County Ground, Derby

9 August
Scorecard

Yorkshire Carnegie; 262/8 (40 overs)	v	Northamptonshire Steelbacks (H); 193 (40 overs)

Yorkshire won by 69 runs
County Ground, Northampton

12 August
Scorecard

Kent Spitfires (H); 248/6 (40 overs)	v	Derbyshire Falcons; 137 (31.4/40 overs)

Kent won by 111 runs
St Lawrence Ground, Canterbury

12 August
Scorecard

Unicorns; 150/6 (37/37 overs)	v	Yorkshire Carnegie (H); 162/5 (34/37 overs)

Yorkshire won by 5 wickets (D/L)
Headingley, Leeds

13 August
Scorecard

Warwickshire Bears (H); 92 (30.4/40 overs)	v	Kent Spitfires; 93/4 (20.2/40 overs)

Kent won by 6 wickets
Edgbaston, Birmingham

15 August
Scorecard

Sussex Sharks (H); 199/9 (40 overs)	v	Warwickshire Bears; 182 (39.4/40 overs)

Sussex won by 17 runs
County Ground, Hove

19 August
Scorecard

Northamptonshire Steelbacks (H); 232/9 (40 overs)	v	Kent Spitfires; 233/5 (38.4/40 overs)

Kent won by 5 wickets
County Ground, Northampton

19 August
Scorecard

Unicorns (H); 185 (38.5/40 overs)	v	Warwickshire Bears; 186/0 (29.2/40 overs)

Warwickshire won by 10 wickets
Sir Paul Getty's Ground, Wormsley

19 August
Scorecard

Yorkshire Carnegie (H); 200/8 (28/28 overs)	v	Sussex Sharks; 207/7 (28/28 overs)

Sussex won by 3 wickets (D/L)
Headingley, Leeds

22 August
Scorecard

Kent Spitfires (H); 226/5 (40 overs)	v	Yorkshire Carnegie; 196 (38.2/40 overs)

Kent won by 30 runs
St Lawrence Ground, Canterbury

27 August
Scorecard

Northamptonshire Steelbacks; 232/8 (40 overs)	v	Derbyshire Falcons (H)

Match abandoned
County Ground, Derby

27 August
Scorecard

Kent Spitfires (H); 210/5 (40 overs)	v	Sussex Sharks; 211/1 (30/40 overs)

Sussex won by 9 wickets
St Lawrence Ground, Canterbury

27 August
Scorecard

Warwickshire Bears; 211/6 (29/29 overs)	v	Yorkshire Carnegie (H); 158 (25.1/29 overs)

Warwickshire won by 55 runs (D/L)
North Marine Road Ground, Scarborough

== Knockout stage ==
Semi-finals
1	Sussex Sharks	219/8
4	Hampshire Royals	222/2
3	Warwickshire Bears	250/6
2	Lancashire Lightning	227

Final
Hampshire Royals	244/5
Warwickshire Bears	244/7

=== Semi-finals ===
1 September
12:45
Scorecard

Sussex Sharks; 219/8 (40 overs)	v	Hampshire Royals; 222/2 (33 overs)
Luke Wright 122 (100); Sean Ervine 3/36 (8 overs)		Michael Carberry 68 (36); William Beer 2/48 (8 overs)

Hampshire won by 8 wickets
County Ground, Hove
Umpires: Peter Hartley and Trevor Jesty
Player of the match: Michael Carberry (Hants)

- Sussex won the toss and elected to bat.

1 September
12:45
Scorecard

Warwickshire Bears; 250/6 (40 overs)	v	Lancashire Lightning; 227 (39.4 overs)
Varun Chopra 110 (124); Ajmal Shahzad 3/52 (8 overs)		Paul Horton 78 (63); Neil Carter 4/38 (8 overs)

Warwickshire won by 23 runs
Old Trafford, Manchester
Umpires: Jeff Evans and Jeremy Lloyds
Player of the match: Varun Chopra (Warks)

- Warwickshire won the toss and elected to bat.

=== Final ===
15 September
11:30
Scorecard

Hampshire Royals; 244/5 (40 overs)	v	Warwickshire Bears; 244/7 (40 overs)
James Adams 66 (70); Chris Wright 1/14 (3 overs)		Ian Bell 81 (81); Chris Wood 3/39 (8 overs)

Hampshire won by losing fewer wickets
Lord's, London
Umpires: Richard Illingworth and Neil Mallender
Player of the match: James Adams (Hants)

- Warwickshire won the toss and elected to field.

== See also ==
- ECB40
