= Ben Howgego =

English cricketer

Personal information
- Full name: Benjamin Harry Nicholas Howgego
- Born: 3 March 1988 (age 38); Kings Lynn, Norfolk
- Batting: Left-handed
- Bowling: Right-arm fast-medium
- Role: Opening Batsman

Domestic team information
- Years: Team
- 2008–2012: Northamptonshire (squad no. 27)
- 2015: Cambridgeshire
- 2016–2017: Bedfordshire

Career statistics
Competition	FC	LA	T20
Matches	21	4	2
Runs scored	670	19	4
Batting average	21.61	9.50	2.00
100s/50s	0/1	0/0	0/0
Top score	80	12	3
Balls bowled	12	0	0
Wickets	0	–	–
Bowling average	–	–	–
5 wickets in innings	0	–	–
10 wickets in match	0	–	–
Best bowling	–	–	–
Catches/stumpings	11/–	0/–	0/–
- Source: Cricinfo, 23 December 2012

Ben Henry Nicholas Howgego (born 3 March 1988) is a former English professional cricketer. He is a left-handed batsman and a right-arm medium-fast bowler.

== Career ==
Howgego played for the Northamptonshire Second XI in 2005, and also played for an ECB Development team when India toured England in 2006. He then made his first-class debut for Northamptonshire as an opening batsman against Gloucestershire in August 2008, having played in the Second XI Championship up to that point in the season. In 2009, he started in the first team due to Niall O'Brien, the regular opening Batsman being injured. He then went back to Exeter University where he was studying for a degree in Sport Science. On return to Northampton, he opened the batting against the touring Australian team scoring 46 runs in the second innings. He then continued to play for the second team, but was unable to do himself justice as he had back and knee injuries.

Howgego got his chance in the 2010 season when an injury to opener Niall O'Brien allowed him a run in the Northants First XI. After several useful knocks, he made his maiden first-class half century against Derbyshire, during a match saving 172-run 3rd wicket partnership with David Sales.

On 16 August 2012, Howgego was released from his Northamptonshire contract after only two first team appearances in the season.

== Career best performances ==
as of 23 December 2012

	Batting			
	Score	Fixture	Venue	Season
First-class	80	Northamptonshire v Derbyshire	Chesterfield	2010
List A	12	Northamptonshire Steelbacks v Scottish Saltires	Edinburgh	2011
T20	3	Northamptonshire Steelbacks v Lancashire Lightning	Manchester	2011
