= Matthew Laidman =

English cricketer

Personal information
- Full name: Matthew John Laidman
- Born: 20 October 1992 (age 34); Sutton, London, England
- Batting: Right-handed
- Role: Wicket-keeper

Domestic team information
- Years: Team
- 2016: Oxford MCCU

Career statistics
Competition	First-class
Matches	2
Runs scored	55
Batting average	18.33
100s/50s	–/–
Top score	30
Catches/stumpings	2/1
- Source: Cricinfo, 15 July 2020

Matthew John Laidman (born 20 October 1992) is an English former first-class cricketer.

Laidman was born at Sutton in October 1992. He was educated at Whitgift School, before going up the University of Exeter. From there, he went to Oxford Brookes University to complete his masters degree. While studying at Oxford Brookes, he made two appearances in first-class cricket for Oxford MCCU, playing against Worcestershire and Northamptonshire at Oxford in 2016. (Note: Oxford MCCU differed from Oxford University Cricket Club in that it was open to students at Oxford Brookes University, whereas Oxford University Cricket Club is exclusively for students of the constituent colleges of the University of Oxford.) Playing as a wicket-keeper, he scored 55 runs in his two matches, with a high score of 30, while behind the stumps he took two catches and made a single stumping.
