= Tom Huggins =

English cricketer

Personal information
- Full name: Thomas Benjamin Huggins
- Born: 6 March 1983 (age 43); Peterborough, Cambridgeshire, England
- Batting: Right-handed
- Bowling: Right-arm off break

Domestic team information
- Years: Team
- 2006–present: Suffolk
- 2003–2005: Northamptonshire
- 2001: Cambridgeshire

Career statistics
| Competition | FC | LA | T20 |
|---|---|---|---|
| Matches | 11 | 7 | 6 |
| Runs scored | 403 | 51 | 25 |
| Batting average | 26.86 | 8.50 | 25.00 |
| 100s/50s | –/2 | –/– | –/– |
| Top score | 82* | 16 | 19 |
| Balls bowled | – | – | 12 |
| Wickets | – | – | – |
| Bowling average | – | – | – |
| 5 wickets in innings | – | – | – |
| 10 wickets in match | – | – | – |
| Best bowling | – | – | – |
| Catches/stumpings | 4/– | –/– | 2/– |
- Source: Cricinfo, 29 September 2010

Thomas Benjamin Huggins (born 6 March 1983) is an English cricketer. Huggins is a right-handed batsman who bowls right-arm off break. He was born in Peterborough, Cambridgeshire and educated at Kimbolton School.

Huggins made his debut in List-A cricket for Cambridgeshire against the Warwickshire Cricket Board in the 2nd round of the 2002 Cheltenham & Gloucester Trophy which was played in 2001. He also played a single Minor Counties Championship match for the county against Staffordshire.

Huggins made his first-class debut for Northamptonshire against Cambridge University in 2003. His first-class debut for the county came in the 2004 County Championship against Lancashire. From 2003 to 2005, he represented the county in 11 first-class matches, the last of which came against the touring Bangladeshis. In his 11 first-class matches he scored 403 runs at a batting average of 26.86, with 2 half centuries and a high score of 82*. In the field he took 4 catches.

In 2004, he made his Northamptonshire List-A debut against the touring Essex in the totesport League. From 2004 to 2005, he represented the county in 6 List-A matches, the last of which came against Gloucestershire in the 2005 totesport League. In the 7 List-A matches he played, he scored 51 runs at an average of 8.50, with a high score of 16.

During the 2005 season he made his Twenty20 debut for the county against Gloucestershire in the 2005 Twenty20 Cup. During the 2005 Twenty20 Cup he played a further 5 Twenty20 matches, the last of which came against Warwickshire. In his 6 Twenty20 matches, he scored 25 runs at an average of 25.00, with a high score of 19. In the field he took 2 catches.

In 2006, he joined Suffolk, where he made his Minor Counties Championship debut for the county against Norfolk. From 2006 to present, he has represented the county in 28 Championship matches. He has also played MCCA Knockout Trophy matches for Suffolk. His debut in that competition for Suffolk came against Bedfordshire in the 2006 MCCA Knockout Trophy. From 2006 to present, he has represented the county in 19 Trophy matches.

He was appointed Essex Graham Gooch Academy Player's Pathway Manager in 2016.
