= Glamorgan County Cricket Club in 2013 =

Cricket club season

Glamorgan County Cricket Club
2013 season
- Coach: (Australia) Matthew Mott
- Captain: (Wales) Mark Wallace
- Overseas player: (Australia) Marcus North (New Zealand) Nathan McCullum (Twenty20 Cup)
- Ground(s): Sophia Gardens, Cardiff; St Helen's, Swansea; Penrhyn Avenue, Rhos-on-Sea
- County Championship: 8th, Division Two
- Pro40: Runners-up
- Twenty20 Cup: 3rd, Mid/Wales/West
- Most runs: FC: Murray Goodwin (1,263); LA: Chris Cooke (546); T20: Jim Allenby (355)
- Most wickets: FC: Michael Hogan (67); LA: Michael Hogan (28); T20: Graham Wagg (15)
- Most catches: FC: Jim Allenby (28); LA: Chris Cooke (9); T20: Chris Cooke (6)
- Most wicket-keeping dismissals: FC: Mark Wallace (44 ct + 3 st); LA: Mark Wallace (8 ct + 1 st); T20: Mark Wallace (1 ct + 3 st)

The 2013 season was Glamorgan County Cricket Club's 126th year in existence and their 93rd as a first-class cricket county. They played most of their home matches at Sophia Gardens in Cardiff, but also used outgrounds in Swansea (St Helen's) and Rhos-on-Sea (Penrhyn Avenue). They finished eighth in Division Two of the County Championship, but came second in Group C of the ECB40, qualifying for the knockout stage as the best runner-up; they went on to beat Hampshire at the Rose Bowl in the semi-finals, but lost to Nottinghamshire by 87 runs in the final at Lord's. In the Twenty20 Cup, they finished third in the Mid/Wales/West Group, just missing out on the quarter-finals. In the limited-overs formats, the team reverted from their "Welsh Dragons" branding to simply being known as Glamorgan.

The team was coached by Matthew Mott for a third year, and captained by wicketkeeper-batsman Mark Wallace in the County Championship, and by Australian batsman Marcus North in the ECB40 and the Twenty20 Cup. North also served as Glamorgan's overseas player for a second year in a row. The club had announced the signing of Australian bowler Dirk Nannes as their second overseas player for the Twenty20 Cup in March 2013, before Nannes suffered a stress fracture in his back while playing for the Chennai Super Kings in the Indian Premier League. They signed New Zealand spin bowler Nathan McCullum as Nannes' replacement in June, following in the footsteps of his younger brother Brendon, who had played for Glamorgan in 2006.

After playing in one County Championship match in 2012, seam bowler Simon Jones renegotiated his contract to add a commitment to play six more first-class matches in 2013; however, he did not play in a single County Championship match in 2013. Glamorgan further added to their bowling attack with the signing of Australian seamer Michael Hogan; he was originally supposed to join in July 2012, but ultimately stayed in Australia to finish his contract with Western Australia. Other signings included youth all-rounder Ruaidhri Smith on a development contract, and Zimbabwean batter Murray Goodwin on an initial one-year deal.

This was Glamorgan's first season without veteran spinner Robert Croft since 1988, having retired at the end of his 23rd season with the Welsh county in September 2012. Seam bowler James Harris also left the club to join Division One side Middlesex at the end of 2012 in a bid to improve his chances of an England call-up, turning down a move to Nottinghamshire and a "substantial contract" with Glamorgan to do so. South African batter Martin van Jaarsveld, and academy products Chris Ashling, Aneurin Norman and Mike O'Shea also left the club at the end of their contracts prior to the start of the 2013 season.

== Squad ==
- No. denotes the player's squad number, as worn on the back of their shirt.
- ‡ denotes players with international caps.
- * denotes a player who has been awarded a county cap.
- Ages given as of the first day of the County Championship season, 10 April 2013.

| No. | Name | Nationality | Birth date | Batting style | Bowling style | Notes |
Batsmen
| | Will Bragg | Wales | 24 October 1986 (aged 26) | Left-handed | — | Occasional wicket-keeper |
| | Murray Goodwin‡ | Zimbabwe | 11 December 1972 (aged 40) | Right-handed | Right arm leg break | |
| | Marcus North‡ | Australia | 28 July 1979 (aged 33) | Left-handed | Right arm off break | Overseas player; white-ball captain |
| | Gareth Rees* | Wales | 8 April 1985 (aged 28) | Left-handed | Left arm medium | |
| | Stewart Walters | Australia | 25 June 1983 (aged 29) | Right-handed | Right arm leg break | |
| | Ben Wright* | England | 5 December 1987 (aged 25) | Right-handed | Right arm medium-fast | |
All-rounders
| | Jim Allenby* | Australia | 12 September 1982 (aged 30) | Right-handed | Right arm medium | |
| | Nick James | England | 17 September 1986 (aged 26) | Left-handed | Slow left-arm orthodox | |
| | David Lloyd | Wales | 15 June 1992 (aged 20) | Right-handed | Right arm medium | |
| | Ruaidhri Smith | Scotland | 5 August 1994 (aged 18) | Right-handed | Right arm fast-medium | |
| | Graham Wagg* | England | 28 April 1983 (aged 29) | Right-handed | Left arm medium | |
Wicket-keepers
| | Chris Cooke | South Africa | 30 May 1986 (aged 26) | Right-handed | Right arm slow-medium | |
| | Mark Wallace* | Wales | 19 November 1981 (aged 31) | Left-handed | — | Club captain |
Bowlers
| | Dean Cosker* | England | 7 January 1978 (aged 35) | Right-handed | Slow left-arm orthodox | |
| | John Glover | Wales | 29 August 1989 (aged 23) | Right-handed | Right arm medium-fast | |
| | Michael Hogan* | Australia | 31 May 1981 (aged 31) | Right-handed | Right arm fast-medium | |
| | Alex Jones | Wales | 10 November 1988 (aged 24) | Right-handed | Left arm medium | |
| | Simon Jones*‡ | Wales/England | 29 August 1989 (aged 23) | Right-handed | Right arm medium-fast | |
| | Nathan McCullum‡ | New Zealand | 1 September 1980 (aged 32) | Right-handed | Right arm off break | Overseas player (T20 only) |
| | Will Owen | Wales | 2 September 1988 (aged 24) | Right-handed | Right arm medium-fast | |
| | Mike Reed | England | 10 September 1988 (aged 24) | Right-handed | Right arm fast-medium | |
| | Andrew Salter | Wales | 1 June 1993 (aged 19) | Right-handed | Right arm off break | |
| | Huw Waters* | Wales | 26 September 1986 (aged 26) | Right-handed | Right arm medium | |

== County Championship ==
=== Table ===
| Pos | Team | Pld | W | L | T | D | A | Bat | Bowl | Ded | Pts | |
|---|---|---|---|---|---|---|---|---|---|---|---|---|
| 1 | Lancashire | 16 | 8 | 1 | 0 | 7 | 0 | 45 | 45 | 1 | 238 | Promotion to Division 1 |
| 2 | Northamptonshire | 16 | 5 | 3 | 0 | 8 | 0 | 55 | 43 | 0 | 202 | Promotion to Division 1 |
| 3 | Essex | 16 | 5 | 4 | 0 | 7 | 0 | 43 | 41 | 3 | 182 | |
| 4 | Hampshire | 16 | 4 | 3 | 0 | 9 | 0 | 45 | 35 | 0 | 171 | |
| 5 | Worcestershire | 16 | 5 | 6 | 0 | 5 | 0 | 29 | 43 | 0 | 167 | |
| 6 | Gloucestershire | 16 | 4 | 4 | 0 | 8 | 0 | 43 | 36 | 0 | 167 | |
| 7 | Kent | 16 | 3 | 2 | 0 | 11 | 0 | 39 | 31 | 0 | 151 | |
| 8 | Glamorgan | 16 | 3 | 6 | 0 | 7 | 0 | 41 | 39 | 0 | 149 | |
| 9 | Leicestershire | 16 | 0 | 8 | 0 | 8 | 0 | 23 | 32 | 0 | 79 | |

Source: Cricinfo

=== Matches ===
==== Glamorgan v Northamptonshire (10–13 April) ====
10–13 April
Scorecard

| Glamorgan | v | Northamptonshire |
| 134 (50 overs); Graham Wagg 26 (36); Steven Crook 4/30 (12 overs) | | 292 (90.1 overs); James Middlebrook 70 (146); Michael Reed 3/53 (17 overs) |
| 96/4 (42 overs); Will Bragg 39 (75); Andrew Hall 2/16 (8 overs) |

Match drawn
Sophia Gardens, Cardiff
Umpires: Steve Garratt and Trevor Jesty

- Northamptonshire won the toss and elected to field.
- No play on day 4 due to rain.
- Points: Northamptonshire 8, Glamorgan 6.

==== Glamorgan v Worcestershire (17–20 April) ====
17–20 April
Scorecard

| Worcestershire | v | Glamorgan |
| 123 (63.1 overs); Moeen Ali 20 (62); Michael Reed 5/27 (15.1 overs) | | 295 (108.4 overs); Jim Allenby 78 (162); Gareth Andrew 4/79 (32 overs) |
| 207 (84.1 overs); Thilan Samaraweera 79 (168); Jim Allenby 4/27 (20 overs) | | 36/0 (9.1 overs); Ben Wright 30* (32) |

Glamorgan won by 10 wickets
Sophia Gardens, Cardiff
Umpires: Neil Bainton and Peter Willey

- Glamorgan won the toss and elected to field.
- Points: Glamorgan 21, Worcestershire 3.

==== Glamorgan v Lancashire (1–3 May) ====
1–4 May
Scorecard

| Lancashire | v | Glamorgan |
| 123 (52.2 overs); Luke Procter 26 (56); John Glover 3/29 (12 overs) | | 242 (83.5 overs); Murray Goodwin 69 (134); Simon Kerrigan 4/48 (16 overs) |
| 272 (107.1 overs); Simon Katich 65 (128); John Glover 3/41 (21.1 overs) | | 139 (37.4 overs); Will Bragg 61 (66); Simon Kerrigan 5/32 (15.4 overs) |

Lancashire won by 14 runs
Penrhyn Avenue, Rhos-on-Sea
Umpires: Tim Robinson and Martin Saggers

- Lancashire won the toss and elected to bat.
- Points: Lancashire 19, Glamorgan 4.

==== Glamorgan v Essex (15–18 May) ====
15–18 May
Scorecard

| Glamorgan | v | Essex |
| 231 (86.1 overs); Jim Allenby 77 (110); David Masters 5/44 (21.1 overs) | | 345 (103.3 overs); Ravi Bopara 145 (265); Michael Hogan 6/70 (25.3 overs) |
| 388 (118.1 overs); Mark Wallace 101 (171); David Masters 3/116 (33 overs) | | 275/5 (68.5 overs); Tom Westley 88 (163); Dean Cosker 2/90 (19 overs) |

Essex won by 5 wickets
Sophia Gardens, Cardiff
Umpires: Nigel Cowley and George Sharp

- Essex won the toss and elected to field.
- Points: Essex 22, Glamorgan 4.

==== Leicestershire v Glamorgan (21–24 May) ====
21–24 May
Scorecard

| Glamorgan | v | Leicestershire |
| 442/9d (132.3 overs); Jim Allenby 138* (204); Nathan Buck 3/83 (31.3 overs) | | 142 (44.3 overs); Josh Cobb 29 (41); Michael Hogan 4/25 (11.3 overs) |
| | | 182/2 (54 overs) (f/o); Greg Smith 70 (136); Michael Reed 1/16 (8 overs) |

Match drawn
Grace Road, Leicester
Umpires: Russell Evans and Jeremy Lloyds

- Leicestershire won the toss and elected to field.
- Points: Glamorgan 10, Leicestershire 5.

==== Gloucestershire v Glamorgan (5–8 June) ====
5–8 June
Scorecard

| Glamorgan | v | Gloucestershire |
| 448 (124.1 overs); Murray Goodwin 108 (239); Craig Miles 5/83 (22 overs) | | 478 (152.2 overs); Michael Klinger 142 (345); Michael Hogan 7/92 (37.2 overs) |
| 176/2d (62.4 overs); Will Bragg 71* (193); Benny Howell 1/14 (10.4 overs) |

Match drawn
County Ground, Bristol
Umpires: Paul Baldwin and Peter Hartley

- Gloucestershire won the toss and chose to field.
- Miles Hammond (Glos) made his first-class debut.
- Points: Gloucestershire 8, Glamorgan 7.

==== Kent v Glamorgan (12–15 June) ====
12–15 June
Scorecard

| Glamorgan | v | Kent |
| 378 (119.4 overs); Murray Goodwin 136 (226); Calum Haggett 4/94 (33 overs) | | 135 (46.5 overs); Rob Key 23 (43); Michael Hogan 3/42 (16 overs) |
| | | 489/9d (142 overs) (f/o); Darren Stevens 119 (154); Dean Cosker 5/120 (50 overs) |

Match drawn
St Lawrence Ground, Canterbury
Umpires: Steve Garratt and Neil Mallender

- Glamorgan won the toss and chose to bat.
- Points: Glamorgan 9, Kent 5.

==== Worcestershire v Glamorgan (20–23 June) ====
20–23 June
Scorecard

| Worcestershire | v | Glamorgan |
| 505/7d (138 overs); Moeen Ali 250 (367); Dean Cosker 4/68 (18 overs) | | 277 (74 overs); Jim Allenby 82 (107); Jack Shantry 4/65 (18 overs) |
| 51/2 (9.5 overs); Daryl Mitchell 22(22); Marcus North 1/5 (0.5 overs) | | 278 (79.1 overs) (f/o); Jim Allenby 74* (92); Jack Shantry 4/77 (23 overs) |

Worcestershire won by 8 wickets
County Ground, New Road, Worcester
Umpires: Martin Bodenham and Michael Gough

- Glamorgan won the toss and chose to field.
- Points: Worcestershire 23, Glamorgan 3.

==== Glamorgan v Hampshire (8–11 July) ====
8–11 July
Scorecard

| Hampshire | v | Glamorgan |
| 341 (122.5 overs); James Vince 80 (131); Michael Hogan 3/48 (29 overs) | | 300/6d (98.5 overs); Gareth Rees 112 (271); Sohail Tanvir 3/62 (21 overs) |
| 179 (67.3 overs); Neil McKenzie 67 (133); Marcus North 5/30 (15.1 overs) | | 177 (68 overs); Murray Goodwin 56*; James Tomlinson 5/44 (18 overs) |

Hampshire won by 43 runs
Sophia Gardens, Cardiff
Umpires: Tim Robinson and Chettithody Shamshuddin

- Hampshire won the toss and elected to bat.
- Points: Hampshire 21, Glamorgan 5.

==== Lancashire v Glamorgan (15–18 July) ====
15–18 July
Scorecard

| Glamorgan | v | Lancashire |
| 474 (150.1 overs); Murray Goodwin 194 (354); Simon Kerrigan 7/162 (49.1 overs) | | 567 (164.4 overs); Simon Katich 115 (237); Nathan McCullum 5/191 (47.4 overs) |
| 183/5 (60 overs); Gareth Rees 107* (169); Simon Kerrigan 5/90 (27 overs) |

Match drawn
Old Trafford, Manchester
Umpires: Mark Benson and Alex Wharf

- Glamorgan won the toss and elected to bat.
- Arron Lilley (Lancs) made his first-class debut.
- Points: Glamorgan 8, Lancashire 7.

==== Hampshire v Glamorgan (2–5 August) ====
2–5 August
Scorecard

| Hampshire | v | Glamorgan |
| 349 (115 overs); Michael Carberry 94 (177); Michael Hogan 4/90 (27 overs) | | 478/9d (120 overs); Chris Cooke 92 (153); Chris Wood 3/61 (22 overs) |
| 237/4 (80.2 overs); Chris Wood 69 (138); Graham Wagg 2/20 (15.2 overs) |

Match drawn
The Rose Bowl, Southampton
Umpires: Neil Mallender and Peter Willey

- Glamorgan won the toss and elected to field.
- Points: Glamorgan 11, Hampshire 8.

==== Glamorgan v Leicestershire (21–24 August) ====
21–24 August
Scorecard

| Leicestershire | v | Glamorgan |
| 203 (77.5 overs); Greg Smith 40 (57); Michael Hogan 5/43 (19 overs) | | 508/9d (121.3 overs); Murray Goodwin 178 (316); Ben Raine 4/98 (23 overs) |
| 268 (88.5 overs); Ned Eckersley 76 (174); Dean Cosker 4/88 (34 overs) |

Glamorgan won by an innings and 37 runs
St Helen's, Swansea
Umpires: Jeff Evans and Nigel Llong

- Leicestershire won the toss and elected to bat.
- Points: Glamorgan 24, Leicestershire 3.

==== Northamptonshire v Glamorgan (28–30 August) ====
28–30 August
Scorecard

| Glamorgan | v | Northamptonshire |
| 241 (72.4 overs); Murray Goodwin 47 (67); Steven Crook 4/66 (18 overs) | | 453 (114.5 overs); Andrew Hall 91* (134); Michael Reed 4/109 (26 overs) |
| 187 (61.5 overs); Will Bragg 44 (107); Trent Copeland 3/41 (19 overs) |

Northamptonshire won by an innings and 25 runs
County Ground, Northampton
Umpires: Mark Benson and Neil Mallender

- Northamptonshire won the toss and elected to field.
- Points: Northamptonshire 24, Glamorgan 4.

==== Glamorgan v Kent (3–5 September) ====
3–5 September
Scorecard

| Glamorgan | v | Kent |
| 158 (60 overs); Ben Wright 55 (103); Darren Stevens 4/34 (15 overs) | | 175 (61.3 overs); Daniel Bell-Drummond 78 (166); Michael Hogan 6/65 (18.3 overs) |
| 258 (77.5 overs); Gareth Rees 52 (104); Adam Riley 3/69 (15.5 overs) | | 242/3 (72.2 overs); Sam Northeast 88 (209); Dean Cosker 2/34 (17 overs) |

Kent won by 7 wickets
Sophia Gardens, Cardiff
Umpires: Nick Cook and George Sharp

- Glamorgan won the toss and elected to bat.
- Ruaidhri Smith (Glam) made his first-class debut.
- Points: Kent 19, Glamorgan 3.

==== Essex v Glamorgan (17–20 September) ====
17–20 September
Scorecard

| Glamorgan | v | Essex |
| 322 (108.1 overs); Chris Cooke 67 (106); David Masters 5/68 (36 overs) | | 424/6d (89 overs); Jaik Mickleburgh 129 (203); Ruaidhri Smith 3/106 (18 overs) |
| 181/2d (44 overs); Gareth Rees 76 (112); Graham Napier 2/49 (11 overs) |

Match drawn
County Ground, Chelmsford
Umpires: Jeff Evans and Steve O'Shaughnessy

- Essex won the toss and elected to field.
- Points: Essex 11, Glamorgan 8.

==== Glamorgan v Gloucstershire (24–27 September) ====
24–27 September
Scorecard

| Gloucestershire | v | Glamorgan |
| 275 (104.3 overs); Chris Dent 84 (149); Jim Allenby 3/31 (19.3 overs) | | 306 (77.4 overs); Jim Allenby 85 (117); Will Gidman 4/64 (18 overs) |
| 132 (44.3 overs); Alex Gidman 26 (30); Jim Allenby 4/16 (10.3 overs) | | 102/2 (30.3 overs); Murray Goodwin 50* (109); Will Gidman 2/9 (7 overs) |

Glamorgan won by 8 wickets
Sophia Gardens, Cardiff
Umpires: Rob Bailey and Steve Garratt

- Glamorgan won the toss and elected to field.
- No play on day 3 due to rain.
- Points: Glamorgan 22, Gloucestershire 5.

== One-Day Cup ==
=== Group stage ===
==== Standings ====
| Pos | Team | Pld | W | L | T | NR | Pts | NRR |
|---|---|---|---|---|---|---|---|---|
| 1 | Somerset | 12 | 8 | 3 | 0 | 1 | 17 | 1.006 |
| 2 | Glamorgan | 12 | 8 | 3 | 0 | 1 | 17 | 0.576 |
| 3 | Middlesex Panthers | 12 | 7 | 4 | 0 | 1 | 15 | 0.315 |
| 4 | Gloucestershire Gladiators | 12 | 7 | 4 | 0 | 1 | 15 | 0.163 |
| 5 | Leicestershire Foxes | 12 | 5 | 7 | 0 | 0 | 10 | −0.353 |
| 6 | Yorkshire Vikings | 12 | 3 | 9 | 0 | 0 | 6 | −0.468 |
| 7 | Unicorns | 12 | 1 | 9 | 0 | 2 | 4 | −1.196 |

Source: Cricinfo

Advanced to the semi-finals

==== Glamorgan v Yorkshire (5 May) ====
5 May
Scorecard

| Glamorgan; 285/7 (40 overs) | v | Yorkshire; 257 (38.2 overs) |
| Marcus North 68 (63); Rich Pyrah 4/43 (8 overs) | | Andrew Gale 65 (67); Michael Hogan 3/29 (7.2 overs) |

Glamorgan won by 28 runs
Penrhyn Avenue, Rhos-on-Sea
Umpires: Martin Saggers and Tim Robinson

- Glamorgan won the toss and elected to bat.
- Mike Reed (Glam) and Will Rhodes (Yorks) made their List A debuts.
- Points: Glamorgan 2, Yorkshire 0.

==== Middlesex v Glamorgan (6 May) ====
6 May
Scorecard

| Glamorgan; 280/3 (40 overs) | v | Middlesex; 254/9 (40 overs) |
| Marcus North 137* (98); Josh Davey 1/55 (8 overs) | | Gareth Berg 75 (57); Will Owen 3/48 (6 overs) |

Glamorgan won by 26 runs
Lord's, London
Umpires: David Millns and Peter Hartley
Player of the match: Marcus North (Glam)

- Middlesex won the toss and elected to field.
- Points: Glamorgan 2, Middlesex 0.

==== Glamorgan v Unicorns (12 May) ====
12 May
Scorecard

| Glamorgan | v | Unicorns |

Match abandoned without a ball bowled
Sophia Gardens, Cardiff
Umpires: Nick Cook and Peter Willey

- No toss.
- No play was possible due to rain.
- Points: Glamorgan 1, Unicorns 1.

==== Glamorgan v Gloucestershire (19 May) ====
19 May
Scorecard

| Gloucestershire; 288/5 (40 overs) | v | Glamorgan; 281/6 (40 overs) |
| Chris Dent 151* (113); Graham Wagg 2/58 (8 overs) | | Mark Wallace 118* (112); James Fuller 3/42 (8 overs) |

Gloucestershire won by 7 runs
Sophia Gardens, Cardiff
Umpires: George Sharp and Nigel Cowley

- Glamorgan won the toss and elected to field.
- Points: Gloucestershire 2, Glamorgan 0.

==== Somerset v Glamorgan (2 June) ====
2 June
Scorecard

| Glamorgan; 245/9 (40 overs) | v | Somerset; 246/7 (38.2 overs) |
| Ben Wright 75* (57); Jamie Overton 3/45 (8 overs) | | Peter Trego 72 (66); Dean Cosker 3/41 (8 overs) |

Somerset won by 3 wickets
County Ground, Taunton
Umpires: Jeff Evans and Jeremy Lloyds

- Somerset won the toss and elected to field.
- Points: Somerset 2, Glamorgan 0.

==== Unicorns v Glamorgan (9 June) ====
9 June
Scorecard

| Glamorgan; 300/6 (40 overs) | v | Unicorns; 215/9 (40 overs) |
| Chris Cooke 98 (77); Dominic Reed 5/31 (8 overs) | | Garry Park 74 (70); Graham Wagg 4/51 (8 overs) |

Glamorgan won by 85 runs
Garon Park, Southend-on-Sea
Umpires: George Sharp and Tim Robinson

- Unicorns won the toss and elected to field.
- Dominic Reed (Unicorns) made his List A debut.
- Marcus North (Glam) was injured after ball 30.4; his over was completed by Will Bragg.
- Points: Glamorgan 2, Unicorns 0.

==== Leicestershire v Glamorgan (19 June) ====
19 June
Scorecard

| Glamorgan; 265/8 (40 overs) | v | Leicestershire; 231 (39.5 overs) |
| Mark Wallace 61 (54); Rob Taylor 3/57 (8 overs) | | Joe Burns 71 (77); Michael Hogan 3/38 (7.5 overs) |

Glamorgan won by 34 runs
Grace Road, Leicester
Umpires: Neil Mallender and Steve Garratt

- Leicestershire won the toss and elected to field.
- Points: Glamorgan 2, Leicestershire 0.

==== Glamorgan v Somerset (12 August) ====
12 August (D/N)
Scorecard

| Somerset; 222/8 (40 overs) | v | Glamorgan; 226/9 (39.3 overs) |
| Jos Buttler 67 (45); Michael Hogan 4/34 (8 overs) | | Mark Wallace 70 (57); Steven Kirby 3/34 (8 overs) |

Glamorgan won by 1 wicket
Sophia Gardens, Cardiff
Umpires: Neil Bainton and Richard Kettleborough

- Glamorgan won the toss and elected to field.
- Points: Glamorgan 2, Somerset 0.

==== Glamorgan v Middlesex (14 August) ====
14 August (D/N)
Scorecard

| Glamorgan; 153/9 (25 overs) | v | Middlesex; 142/9 (25 overs) |
| Gareth Rees 32 (53); Toby Roland-Jones 3/13 (5 overs) | | Neil Dexter 54 (52); Dean Cosker 3/32 (5 overs) |

Glamorgan won by 11 runs
Sophia Gardens, Cardiff
Umpires: Neil Bainton and Richard Kettleborough
Player of the match: Graham Wagg (Glam)

- Middlesex won the toss and elected to field.
- Rain reduced the match to 25 overs-a-side.
- Points: Glamorgan 2, Middlesex 0.

==== Gloucestershire v Glamorgan (18 August) ====
18 August
Scorecard

| Glamorgan; 247/7 (40 overs) | v | Gloucestershire; 251/8 (39.5 overs) |
| Gareth Rees 83 (110); Tom Smith 2/43 (8 overs) | | Michael Klinger 87 (99); Dean Cosker 2/28 (8 overs) |

Gloucestershire won by 2 wickets
County Ground, Bristol
Umpires: Martin Bodenham and Nigel Cowley

- Glamorgan won the toss and elected to bat.
- Points: Gloucestershire 2, Glamorgan 0.

==== Glamorgan v Leicestershire (25 August) ====
25 August
Scorecard

| Glamorgan; 303/6 (40 overs) | v | Leicestershire; 235/6 (40 overs) |
| Chris Cooke 85 (76); James Sykes 2/37 (8 overs) | | Niall O'Brien 92 (121); Jim Allenby 3/37 (8 overs) |

Glamorgan won by 68 runs
St Helen's, Swansea
Umpires: Jeff Evans and Nigel Llong

- Glamorgan won the toss and elected to bat.
- Points: Glamorgan 2, Leicestershire 0.

==== Yorkshire v Glamorgan (26 August) ====
26 August
Scorecard

| Yorkshire; 215/5 (40 overs) | v | Glamorgan; 216/6 (38.5 overs) |
| Dan Hodgson 90 (98); Michael Hogan 2/43 (8 overs) | | Chris Cooke 84 (78); Moin Ashraf 3/38 (7 overs) |

Glamorgan won by 4 wickets
Headingley, Leeds
Umpires: Peter Willey and Trevor Jesty

- Yorkshire won the toss and elected to bat.
- Jonny Tattersall (Yorks) made his List A debut.
- Points: Glamorgan 2, Yorkshire 0.

=== Knockout stage ===
==== Semi-final: Hampshire v Glamorgan (7 September) ====
7 September
Scorecard

| Glamorgan; 234/4 (40 overs) | v | Hampshire; 203/8 (40 overs) |
| Jim Allenby 74* (71); Sohail Tanvir 2/40 (8 overs) | | Jimmy Adams 59 (83); Michael Hogan 4/51 (8 overs) |

Glamorgan won by 31 runs
Rose Bowl, Southampton
Umpires: David Millns and Peter Hartley
Player of the match: Jim Allenby (Glam)

- Hampshire won the toss and elected to field.

==== Final: Nottinghamshire v Glamorgan (21 September) ====
21 September
Scorecard

| Nottinghamshire; 244/8 (40 overs) | v | Glamorgan; 157 (33 overs) |
| Chris Read 53 (53); Simon Jones 2/36 (8 overs) | | Chris Cooke 46 (45); Samit Patel 3/21 (7 overs) |

Nottinghamshire won by 87 runs
Lord's, London
Umpires: Peter Hartley and Richard Kettleborough
Player of the match: Samit Patel (Notts)

- Glamorgan won the toss and elected to field.

== Twenty20 Cup ==
=== Standings ===
| Pos | Team | Pld | W | L | T | NR | Pts | NRR |
|---|---|---|---|---|---|---|---|---|
| 1 | Northamptonshire Steelbacks | 10 | 7 | 3 | 0 | 0 | 14 | 0.329 |
| 2 | Somerset | 10 | 6 | 4 | 0 | 0 | 12 | 0.841 |
| 3 | Glamorgan | 10 | 5 | 5 | 0 | 0 | 10 | −0.168 |
| 4 | Warwickshire Bears | 10 | 5 | 5 | 0 | 0 | 10 | −0.410 |
| 5 | Worcestershire Royals | 10 | 4 | 6 | 0 | 0 | 8 | −0.327 |
| 6 | Gloucestershire Gladiators | 10 | 3 | 7 | 0 | 0 | 6 | −0.245 |

Source: Cricinfo

Advanced to the quarter-finals

=== Matches ===
==== Worcestershire Royals v Glamorgan (28 June) ====
28 June
Scorecard

| Glamorgan; 159/4 (14 overs) | v | Worcestershire Royals; 102/9 (14 overs) |
| Chris Cooke 57 (27); Andre Russell 2/38 (3 overs) | | Ben Cox 27 (22); Graham Wagg 5/14 (3 overs) |

Glamorgan won by 58 runs (D/L method)
New Road, Worcester
Umpires: Nick Cook and Stephen Gale
Player of the match: Graham Wagg (Glam)

- Worcestershire Royals won the toss and elected to field.
- Rain during the Glamorgan innings reduced the match to 14 overs-a-side.
- Points: Glamorgan 2, Worcestershire Royals 0.

==== Glamorgan v Warwickshire Bears (3 July) ====
3 July (N)
Scorecard

| Warwickshire Bears; 118 (20 overs) | v | Glamorgan; 121/6 (19.1 overs) |
| Rikki Clarke 42 (41); Graham Wagg 3/24 (4 overs) | | Marcus North 37 (47); Ateeq Javid 2/18 (4 overs) |

Glamorgan won by 4 wickets
Sophia Gardens, Cardiff
Umpires: Jeremy Lloyds and Martin Saggers
Player of the match: Nathan McCullum (Glam)

- Glamorgan won the toss and elected to field.
- Ateeq Javid and Peter McKay (both Warks) made their T20 debuts.
- Points: Glamorgan 2, Warwickshire Bears 0.

==== Warwickshire Bears v Glamorgan (6 July) ====
6 July
Scorecard

| Warwickshire Bears; 126/8 (20 overs) | v | Glamorgan; 132/2 (17.4 overs) |
| Varun Chopra 30 (35); Michael Hogan 3/11 (4 overs) | | Mark Wallace 69* (52); Chris Woakes 1/15 (3 overs) |

Glamorgan won by 8 wickets
Rugby School, Rugby
Umpires: Nick Cook and Steve O'Shaughnessy
Player of the match: Mark Wallace (Glam)

- Warwickshire Bears won the toss and elected to bat.
- Points: Glamorgan 2, Warwickshire Bears 0.

==== Glamorgan v Somerset (12 July) ====
12 July (N)
Scorecard

| Somerset; 125/6 (20 overs) | v | Glamorgan; 126/1 (15.2 overs) |
| Peter Trego 42* (45); Graham Wagg 3/29 (4 overs) | | Jim Allenby 47* (47); Yasir Arafat 1/29 (3 overs) |

Glamorgan won by 9 wickets
Sophia Gardens, Cardiff
Umpires: Tim Robinson and Trevor Jesty
Player of the match: Jim Allenby (Glam)

- Somerset won the toss and elected to bat.
- Points: Glamorgan 2, Somerset 0.

==== Northamptonshire Steelbacks v Glamorgan (14 July) ====
14 July
Scorecard

| Glamorgan; 153/7 (20 overs) | v | Northamptonshire Steelbacks; 157/3 (20 overs) |
| Murray Goodwin 47 (31); Azharullah 4/14 (4 overs) | | Cameron White 68 (52); Dean Cosker 1/23 (4 overs) |

Northamptonshire Steelbacks won by 7 wickets
County Ground, Northampton
Umpires: Nick Cook and Rob Bailey
Player of the match: Azharullah (Nthnts)

- Northamptonshire Steelbacks won the toss and elected to field.
- Points: Northamptonshire Steelbacks 2, Glamorgan 0.

==== Somerset v Glamorgan (19 July) ====
19 July
Scorecard

| Somerset; 199/6 (20 overs) | v | Glamorgan; 135 (18.1 overs) |
| Jos Buttler 48 (19); Dean Cosker 2/18 (4 overs) | | Jim Allenby 69 (39); Max Waller 4/27 (4 overs) |

Somerset won by 64 runs
County Ground, Taunton
Umpires: Peter Hartley and Richard Illingworth
Player of the match: Max Waller (Somst)

- Glamorgan won the toss and elected to field.
- Points: Somerset 2, Glamorgan 0.

==== Gloucestershire Gladiators v Glamorgan (21 July) ====
21 July
Scorecard

| Glamorgan; 98/9 (20 overs) | v | Gloucestershire Gladiators; 99/0 (12.5 overs) |
| Marcus North 35 (40); David Payne 3/17 (4 overs) | | Chris Dent 63* (43) |

Gloucestershire Gladiators won by 10 wickets
College Ground, Cheltenham
Umpires: Graham Lloyd and Richard Illingworth
Player of the match: David Payne (Glos)

- Glamorgan won the toss and elected to bat.
- Points: Gloucestershire Gladiators 2, Glamorgan 0.

==== Glamorgan v Worcestershire Royals (23 July) ====
23 July (N)
Scorecard

| Worcestershire Royals; 157/6 (20 overs) | v | Glamorgan; 161/5 (19.1 overs) |
| Thilan Samaraweera 65 (42); Graham Wagg 3/15 (4 overs) | | Murray Goodwin 59 (37); Gareth Andrew 3/27 (4 overs) |

Glamorgan won by 5 wickets
Sophia Gardens, Cardiff
Umpires: Jeremy Lloyds and Michael Gough
Player of the match: Murray Goodwin (Glam)

- Worcestershire Royals won the toss and elected to bat.
- Points: Glamorgan 2, Worcestershire Royals 0.

==== Glamorgan v Northamptonshire Steelbacks (26 July) ====
26 July (N)
Scorecard

| Glamorgan; 125/9 (20 overs) | v | Northamptonshire Steelbacks; 129/4 (18.3 overs) |
| Chris Cooke 50 (38); Azharullah 4/16 (4 overs) | | Cameron White 71* (48); Michael Hogan 1/17 (4 overs) |

Northamptonshire Steelbacks won by 6 wickets
Sophia Gardens, Cardiff
Umpires: Mark Benson and Neil Bainton
Player of the match: Cameron White (Nthnts)

- Northamptonshire Steelbacks won the toss and elected to field.
- Points: Northamptonshire Steelbacks 2, Glamorgan 0.

==== Glamorgan v Gloucestershire Gladiators (30 July) ====
30 July (N)
Scorecard

| Glamorgan; 141/5 (20 overs) | v | Gloucestershire Gladiators; 145/1 (16.3 overs) |
| Jim Allenby 85* (58); Benny Howell 2/25 (4 overs) | | Michael Klinger 86* (60); Nathan McCullum 1/19 (3 overs) |

Gloucestershire Gladiators won by 9 wickets
Sophia Gardens, Cardiff
Umpires: Jeremy Lloyds and Stephen Gale
Player of the match: Michael Klinger (Glos)

- Gloucestershire Gladiators won the toss and elected to field.
- Tom Shrewsbury (Glos) made his T20 debut.
- Points: Gloucestershire Gladiators 2, Glamorgan 0.

== Pre-season and friendlies ==
=== Two-day: Glamorgan v Gloucestershire (27–28 March) ===
27–28 March
Scorecard

| Gloucestershire | v | Glamorgan |
| 193/7d (77 overs); Hamish Marshall 45 (101); Dean Cosker 2/23 (13 overs) | | 238/9d (70 overs); Mark Wallace 72 (112); James Fuller 3/30 (8 overs) |
| 34/2 (10 overs); Chris Dent 15 (29); Mike Reed 2/17 (5 overs) |

Match drawn
Sophia Gardens, Cardiff
Umpires: Bob Szpadt and Richie Thomas

- Gloucestershire won the toss and elected to bat.
- 12 players per side (11 batting, 11 fielding).

=== 40-over: Glamorgan v Worcestershire (29 March) ===
29 March
Scorecard

| Glamorgan; 221/9 (40 overs) | v | Worcestershire; 222/8 (37.4 overs) |
| Mark Wallace 49 (38); Moeen Ali 3/25 (8 overs) | | Moeen Ali 103 (84); Will Owen 3/35 (6.4 overs) |

Worcestershire won by 2 wickets
Sophia Gardens, Cardiff
Umpires: Dean Price and Mike Harries

- Glamorgan won the toss and elected to bat.
- 12 players per side (11 batting, 11 fielding).

=== Three-day: Glamorgan v Cardiff MCCU (5–7 April) ===
5–7 April
Scorecard

| Glamorgan | v | Cardiff MCCU |
| 275/7d (85 overs); Ben Wright 68* (141); David Phillips 2/45 (14 overs) | | 169 (82.4 overs); Sam Davies 31 (35); Mike Reed 6/34 (14.4 overs) |
| 241/5d (58.2 overs); Will Bragg 63 (75); Phil Harris 2/22 (7 overs) | | 144/6 (48 overs); Fabian Cowdrey 62 (83); Jim Allenby 3/13 (7 overs) |

Match drawn
Sophia Gardens, Cardiff
Umpires: Alex Wharf and Nigel Cowley

- Cardiff MCCU won the toss and elected to field.
- David Phillips, Fabian Cowdrey and Jonathan Denning (all Cardiff MCCU) made their first-class debuts.
- Chris Cooke kept wicket for Glamorgan in Cardiff MCCU's second innings after Mark Wallace suffered an injury.

== Statistics ==
=== Batting ===
First-class
| Player | Matches | Innings | NO | Runs | HS | Ave | SR | 100 | 50 | 0 | 4s | 6s |
|---|---|---|---|---|---|---|---|---|---|---|---|---|
| Murray Goodwin | 16 | 26 | 4 | 1,263 | 194 | 57.40 | 48.13 | 4 | 7 | 1 | 167 | 1 |
| Jim Allenby | 16 | 25 | 5 | 1,202 | 138* | 60.10 | 68.14 | 2 | 8 | 2 | 151 | 8 |
| Will Bragg | 15 | 26 | 2 | 660 | 71* | 27.50 | 47.44 | 0 | 4 | 0 | 86 | 1 |
| Mark Wallace | 17 | 24 | 0 | 656 | 101 | 27.33 | 60.96 | 1 | 2 | 3 | 76 | 3 |
| Ben Wright | 14 | 25 | 3 | 604 | 68* | 27.45 | 47.29 | 0 | 3 | 3 | 83 | 0 |
| Gareth Rees | 9 | 16 | 1 | 564 | 112 | 37.60 | 49.95 | 2 | 3 | 2 | 72 | 3 |
| Stewart Walters | 10 | 17 | 0 | 398 | 98 | 23.41 | 46.17 | 0 | 2 | 1 | 42 | 0 |
| Chris Cooke | 7 | 11 | 1 | 394 | 92 | 39.40 | 52.60 | 0 | 3 | 0 | 53 | 2 |
| Marcus North | 11 | 18 | 1 | 392 | 68 | 23.05 | 37.91 | 0 | 1 | 0 | 54 | 0 |
| Graham Wagg | 10 | 12 | 1 | 308 | 58 | 28.00 | 58.00 | 0 | 2 | 1 | 42 | 4 |
Source: Cricinfo

List A
| Player | Matches | Innings | NO | Runs | HS | Ave | SR | 100 | 50 | 0 | 4s | 6s |
|---|---|---|---|---|---|---|---|---|---|---|---|---|
| Chris Cooke | 13 | 13 | 0 | 546 | 98 | 42.00 | 101.11 | 0 | 5 | 1 | 54 | 5 |
| Jim Allenby | 13 | 13 | 2 | 454 | 85 | 41.27 | 113.78 | 0 | 3 | 0 | 31 | 12 |
| Mark Wallace | 13 | 13 | 1 | 437 | 118* | 36.41 | 101.62 | 1 | 4 | 0 | 44 | 6 |
| Marcus North | 11 | 11 | 1 | 381 | 137* | 38.10 | 98.19 | 1 | 1 | 0 | 37 | 5 |
| Murray Goodwin | 13 | 12 | 1 | 333 | 49 | 30.27 | 122.42 | 0 | 0 | 0 | 37 | 4 |
| Gareth Rees | 7 | 7 | 0 | 218 | 83 | 31.14 | 67.28 | 0 | 1 | 0 | 17 | 1 |
| Will Bragg | 6 | 6 | 0 | 203 | 62 | 33.83 | 87.12 | 0 | 2 | 1 | 25 | 1 |
| Ben Wright | 8 | 8 | 5 | 179 | 75* | 59.66 | 122.60 | 0 | 1 | 0 | 17 | 3 |
| Graham Wagg | 13 | 11 | 3 | 174 | 54 | 21.75 | 121.67 | 0 | 1 | 1 | 15 | 9 |
| Dean Cosker | 13 | 7 | 2 | 56 | 37 | 11.20 | 107.69 | 0 | 0 | 1 | 4 | 2 |
Source: Cricinfo

Twenty20
| Player | Matches | Innings | NO | Runs | HS | Ave | SR | 100 | 50 | 0 | 4s | 6s |
|---|---|---|---|---|---|---|---|---|---|---|---|---|
| Jim Allenby | 9 | 9 | 2 | 355 | 85* | 50.71 | 134.98 | 0 | 3 | 0 | 41 | 9 |
| Chris Cooke | 10 | 10 | 1 | 217 | 57 | 24.11 | 130.72 | 0 | 2 | 0 | 16 | 9 |
| Mark Wallace | 10 | 9 | 1 | 188 | 69* | 23.50 | 118.23 | 0 | 1 | 1 | 19 | 3 |
| Murray Goodwin | 10 | 9 | 1 | 158 | 59 | 19.75 | 128.45 | 0 | 1 | 0 | 14 | 3 |
| Marcus North | 9 | 7 | 1 | 145 | 37 | 24.16 | 86.82 | 0 | 0 | 0 | 8 | 2 |
| Nathan McCullum | 10 | 7 | 2 | 53 | 20 | 10.60 | 126.19 | 0 | 0 | 1 | 4 | 2 |
| Ben Wright | 8 | 6 | 2 | 52 | 22* | 13.00 | 89.65 | 0 | 0 | 0 | 4 | 0 |
| Nick James | 8 | 5 | 2 | 50 | 27 | 16.66 | 76.92 | 0 | 0 | 0 | 2 | 1 |
| Graham Wagg | 10 | 6 | 2 | 30 | 14 | 7.50 | 103.44 | 0 | 0 | 0 | 2 | 1 |
| Dean Cosker | 10 | 3 | 1 | 25 | 15 | 12.50 | 89.28 | 0 | 0 | 1 | 0 | 1 |
Source: Cricinfo

=== Bowling ===
First-class
| Player | Matches | Innings | Overs | Maidens | Runs | Wickets | BBI | BBM | Ave | Econ | SR | 5w | 10w |
|---|---|---|---|---|---|---|---|---|---|---|---|---|---|
| Michael Hogan | 14 | 25 | 512.0 | 133 | 1,376 | 67 | 7/92 | 7/92 | 20.53 | 2.68 | 45.85 | 4 | 0 |
| Mike Reed | 12 | 21 | 330.3 | 63 | 1,120 | 38 | 6/34 | 7/46 | 29.47 | 3.38 | 52.18 | 2 | 0 |
| Dean Cosker | 16 | 24 | 462.2 | 93 | 1,318 | 37 | 5/120 | 6/121 | 35.62 | 2.85 | 74.97 | 1 | 0 |
| Jim Allenby | 16 | 26 | 391.5 | 109 | 951 | 30 | 4/16 | 7/47 | 31.70 | 2.42 | 78.36 | 0 | 0 |
| Graham Wagg | 10 | 17 | 295.2 | 63 | 971 | 18 | 3/78 | 3/78 | 53.94 | 3.28 | 98.44 | 0 | 0 |
| John Glover | 8 | 11 | 174.1 | 35 | 558 | 14 | 4/51 | 6/70 | 39.85 | 3.20 | 74.64 | 0 | 0 |
| Ruaidhri Smith | 3 | 5 | 61.0 | 6 | 274 | 10 | 3/50 | 5/87 | 27.40 | 4.49 | 36.60 | 0 | 0 |
| Marcus North | 11 | 11 | 48.2 | 6 | 143 | 7 | 5/30 | 5/43 | 20.42 | 2.95 | 41.42 | 1 | 0 |
| Andrew Salter | 3 | 4 | 55.0 | 14 | 182 | 7 | 3/66 | 5/100 | 26.00 | 3.30 | 47.14 | 0 | 0 |
| Nathan McCullum | 1 | 1 | 47.4 | 6 | 191 | 5 | 5/191 | 5/191 | 38.20 | 4.00 | 57.20 | 1 | 0 |
Source: Cricinfo

List A
| Player | Matches | Innings | Overs | Maidens | Runs | Wickets | BBI | Ave | Econ | SR | 4w | 5w |
|---|---|---|---|---|---|---|---|---|---|---|---|---|
| Michael Hogan | 12 | 12 | 87.2 | 9 | 488 | 28 | 4/34 | 17.42 | 5.58 | 18.71 | 2 | 0 |
| Graham Wagg | 13 | 13 | 90.0 | 0 | 657 | 18 | 4/51 | 36.50 | 7.30 | 30.00 | 1 | 0 |
| Dean Cosker | 13 | 13 | 94.0 | 0 | 507 | 15 | 3/32 | 33.80 | 5.39 | 37.60 | 0 | 0 |
| Jim Allenby | 13 | 13 | 86.0 | 5 | 439 | 12 | 3/37 | 36.58 | 5.10 | 43.00 | 0 | 0 |
| Simon Jones | 9 | 9 | 56.0 | 2 | 329 | 10 | 2/17 | 32.90 | 5.87 | 33.60 | 0 | 0 |
| Will Owen | 4 | 4 | 22.0 | 1 | 149 | 5 | 3/48 | 29.80 | 6.77 | 26.40 | 0 | 0 |
| Andrew Salter | 4 | 4 | 29.0 | 1 | 138 | 3 | 2/41 | 46.00 | 4.75 | 58.00 | 0 | 0 |
| Marcus North | 11 | 6 | 18.4 | 0 | 113 | 2 | 1/16 | 56.50 | 6.05 | 56.00 | 0 | 0 |
| Will Bragg | 6 | 2 | 3.2 | 1 | 23 | 1 | 1/11 | 23.00 | 6.90 | 20.00 | 0 | 0 |
| Alex Jones | 1 | 1 | 4.0 | 0 | 26 | 1 | 1/26 | 26.00 | 6.50 | 24.00 | 0 | 0 |
Source: Cricinfo

Twenty20
| Player | Matches | Innings | Overs | Maidens | Runs | Wickets | BBI | Ave | Econ | SR | 4w | 5w |
|---|---|---|---|---|---|---|---|---|---|---|---|---|
| Graham Wagg | 10 | 10 | 33.0 | 0 | 240 | 15 | 5/14 | 16.00 | 7.27 | 13.20 | 0 | 1 |
| Nathan McCullum | 10 | 10 | 31.0 | 1 | 252 | 10 | 2/20 | 25.20 | 8.12 | 18.60 | 0 | 0 |
| Michael Hogan | 10 | 10 | 35.0 | 0 | 197 | 8 | 3/11 | 24.62 | 5.62 | 26.25 | 0 | 0 |
| Dean Cosker | 10 | 10 | 35.0 | 0 | 232 | 7 | 2/18 | 33.14 | 6.62 | 30.00 | 0 | 0 |
| Nick James | 8 | 8 | 17.0 | 0 | 154 | 3 | 1/19 | 51.33 | 9.05 | 34.00 | 0 | 0 |
| Jim Allenby | 9 | 7 | 21.0 | 0 | 156 | 2 | 1/27 | 78.00 | 7.42 | 63.00 | 0 | 0 |
| Alex Jones | 4 | 3 | 4.0 | 0 | 35 | 1 | 1/12 | 35.00 | 8.75 | 24.00 | 0 | 0 |
Source: Cricinfo
