= Cyril Rowland =

Welsh cricketer

Personal information
- Full name: Cyril Arthur Rowland
- Born: 9 June 1905; Rhos-on-Sea, Denbighshire, Wales
- Died: 30 June 1971 (aged 66); Great Horkesley, Essex, England
- Batting: Right-handed
- Role: Occasional wicket-keeper
- Relatives: William Rowland (brother)

Domestic team information
- Years: Team
- 1930–1934: Denbighshire
- 1924–1930: Wales

Career statistics
Competition	First-class
Matches	14
Runs scored	330
Batting average	16.50
100s/50s	–/2
Top score	52*
Catches/stumpings	3/–
- Source: Cricinfo, 24 August 2011

Cyril Arthur Rowland (9 June 1905 – 30 June 1971) was a Welsh cricketer. Rowland was a right-handed batsman who occasionally fielded as a wicket-keeper. He was born in Rhos-on-Sea, Denbighshire.

Rowland made his first-class debut for Wales against Scotland in 1924. He made 13 further first-class appearances for Wales, the last of which came against the Marylebone Cricket Club in 1930. In his 14 first-class matches, he scored 330 runs at an average of 16.50, with a high score of 52 not out. This score, one of two first-class fifties he made, came against the touring West Indians in 1928.

Having played Minor counties cricket for the Lancashire Second XI in 1926 and 1929, he later joined Denbighshire who he made his debut for in the 1934 Minor Counties Championship against Cheshire. He made a further nine Minor Counties Championship appearances for the county, the last of which came against Durham in 1934.

He died in Great Horkesley, Essex on 30 June 1971. He had survived his brother William, who also played first-class cricket for Wales, by 29 years.
