= William Rowland =

William Rowland may refer to:

- William Rowland (cricketer) (1904–1942), Welsh cricketer
- William Rowland (film director) (1898–1983), actor, producer, and director
- William B. Rowland (died 1885), American politician from Maryland
- William R. Rowland (1846–1926), sheriff of Los Angeles County, California

== See also ==
- William Rowlands (disambiguation)
