= William Rowland (cricketer) =

Welsh cricketer

Personal information
- Full name: William Harold Rowland
- Born: 24 February 1904; Rhos-on-Sea, Denbighshire, Wales
- Died: 12 April 1942 (aged 38); Wilford, Nottinghamshire, England
- Batting: Unknown
- Role: Occasional wicket-keeper
- Relatives: Cyril Rowland (brother)

Domestic team information
- Years: Team
- 1930: Denbighshire
- 1925–1930: Wales

Career statistics
Competition	First-class
Matches	6
Runs scored	25
Batting average	5.00
100s/50s	–/–
Top score	11*
Balls bowled	–
Wickets	–
Bowling average	–
5 wickets in innings	–
10 wickets in match	–
Best bowling	–
Catches/stumpings	4/1
- Source: Cricinfo, 24 August 2011

William Harold Rowland (24 February 1904 – 12 April 1942) was a Welsh cricketer. Rowland's batting style is unknown, but it is known he occasionally fielded as a wicket-keeper. He was born in Rhos-on-Sea, Denbighshire.

Rowland made his first-class debut for Wales against the Marylebone Cricket Club in 1925. He made five further first-class appearances for Wales, the last of which came against the Marylebone Cricket Club in 1930. In his thirteen first-class matches, he scored 25 runs at an average of 5.00, with a high score of 11 not out. He also played Minor counties cricket for Denbighshire, who he made his debut for in the 1930 Minor Counties Championship against Cheshire. He made two further Minor Counties Championship appearances for the county, both in 1930 against Lincolnshire and the Lancashire Second XI.

He died in Wilford, Nottinghamshire on 12 April 1942. He was survived by his brother Cyril, who also played first-class cricket for Wales.
