= William Rowlands =

William Rowlands may refer to:

- William Rowlands (Australian cricketer) (1904–1984), Australian cricketer
- William Rowlands (English cricketer) (1883–1948), English cricketer
- William Rowlands (Gwilym Lleyn) (1802–1865), Welsh bibliographer and Methodist minister
- William Bowen Rowlands (1837–1906), British politician and member of parliament
- William Penfro Rowlands (1860–1937), Welsh schoolteacher and composer

== See also ==
- William Rowland (disambiguation)
