= Dominic Reed =

English cricketer

Personal information
- Full name: Dominic Terrence Reed
- Born: 27 March 1990 (age 36); Leicester, Leicestershire, England
- Batting: Right-handed
- Bowling: Right-arm medium-fast
- Relatives: Michael Reed (brother)

Domestic team information
- Years: Team
- 2012: Cambridgeshire
- 2013: Norfolk
- 2013: Unicorns

Career statistics
Competition	List A
Matches	6
Runs scored	17
Batting average	8.50
100s/50s	–/–
Top score	8*
Balls bowled	198
Wickets	7
Bowling average	28.85
5 wickets in innings	1
10 wickets in match	–
Best bowling	5/31
Catches/stumpings	1/–
- Source: Cricinfo, 25 February 2019

Dominic Terry Reed (born 27 March 1990) is an English former cricketer.

Reed was born at Leicester and attended De Lisle College in nearby Loughborough. From there he went up to Cardiff University. While studying at Cardiff, Reed played for Cardiff MCCU in the season before the team gained first-class status. Alongside Cardiff MCCU teammate Tom Friend, Reed was called up to the Unicorns squad for the 2011 Clydesdale Bank 40, but did not feature in any of the Unicorns matches in the tournament. He played minor counties cricket for Cambridgeshire in 2012, making three appearances in the MCCA Knockout Trophy, before playing for Norfolk in the 2013 MCCA Knockout Trophy. He did feature for the Unicorns in the 2013 Yorkshire Bank 40, making his List A one-day debut during the tournament against Glamorgan at Southend-on-Sea. He took five wickets on debut when he took 5 for 31 from eight overs in Glamorgan's innings. He made five further List A appearances during the tournament. With his right-arm medium-fast bowling he took 7 wickets across his six List A matches, which came at an average of 28.85.

He is employed as the head of cricket at Kingston Grammar School. His brother, Michael, has played first-class cricket.
