= Mike Reed (cricketer) =

English cricketer

Personal information
- Full name: Michael Thomas Reed
- Born: 10 September 1988 (age 38); Leicester, Leicestershire, England
- Batting: Right-handed
- Bowling: Right-arm fast-medium
- Relatives: Dominic Reed (brother)

Domestic team information
- Years: Team
- 2012–2014: Glamorgan (squad no. 35)
- 2009–2010: Wales Minor Counties

Career statistics
Competition	First-class	List A
Matches	16	3
Runs scored	89	–
Batting average	6.84	–
100s/50s	–/–	–/–
Top score	27	–
Balls bowled	2,511	66
Wickets	46	0
Bowling average	31.08	–
5 wickets in innings	2	–
10 wickets in match	–	–
Best bowling	6/34	–
Catches/stumpings	2/–	1/–
- Source: Cricinfo, 29 September 2013

Michael Thomas Reed (born 10 September 1988) is an English cricketer who is currently without a club. He is a right-handed batsman who bowls right-arm fast-medium pace. He was born in Leicester, Leicestershire.

Reed was educated at the De Lisle School, before attending Cardiff University to study Maths, where he played cricket for Cardiff MCCU. He also played minor counties cricket for Wales Minor Counties while he was studying, making his debut for the team against Shropshire in the 2009 Minor Counties Championship. He made four further Minor Counties Championship appearances for the team, the last of which came against Wiltshire in 2010. He also came to Glamorgan's attention while studying at Cardiff University, with the county signing him on a development contract for 2012. He made his first-class debut for the county against Derbyshire in the 2012 County Championship at the SWALEC Stadium. He has made two further first-class appearances for Glamorgan in the 2012 County Championship, in a return fixture against Derbyshire at the County Ground, Derby, and against Hampshire at the Rose Bowl. On 17 September 2012, Reed, signed a new 2-year contract extension.

Reed had two five-wicket hauls in the 2013 season, firstly against Cardiff MCCU in an early season encounter, and later against Worcestershire in the County Championship.

After missing the entire 2014 season with an injured knee, on which he had two operations, Reed left Glamorgan in September 2014.

== Career best performances ==
	Batting				Bowling			
	Score	Fixture	Venue	Season	Score	Fixture	Venue	Season
FC	27	Glamorgan v Kent	Canterbury	2013	6-34	Glamorgan v Cardiff MCCU	Cardiff	2013
