= Aneurin Norman =

Welsh cricketer

Personal information
- Full name: Aneurin John Norman
- Born: 22 March 1991 (age 35); Cardiff, Wales
- Batting: Right-handed
- Bowling: Right-arm medium

Domestic team information
- Years: Team
- 2011–2012: Glamorgan (squad no. 37)
- 2008–present: Wales Minor Counties

Career statistics
Competition	First-class	List A
Matches	1	2
Runs scored	–	16
Batting average	–	8.00
100s/50s	–/–	–/–
Top score	–	15
Balls bowled	78	66
Wickets	–	0
Bowling average	–	–
5 wickets in innings	–	–
10 wickets in match	–	–
Best bowling	–	–
Catches/stumpings	0/–	0/–
- Source: Cricinfo, 31 March 2013

Aneurin John Norman (born 22 March 1991) is a Welsh cricketer. Norman is a right-handed batsman who bowls right-arm medium pace. He was born in Cardiff, Glamorgan, and was educated at Millfield School in Somerset, England.

Norman made his debut in county cricket for Wales Minor Counties in the 2008 Minor Counties Championship against Dorset. To date he has made fifteen Minor Counties Championship appearances, as well as nine appearances in the MCCA Knockout Trophy.

Having played Second XI cricket for the Glamorgan Second XI since 2008, Norman made his full debut for Glamorgan in a List A match against the Unicorns in the 2011 Clydesdale Bank 40. Later in the 2011 season, Norman made his first-class debut against Kent at the St Lawrence Ground in Canterbury, which was the first day/night County Championship match to be played in England. Norman was released by Glamorgan following the 2012 season, subsequently joining the Unicorns for the 2013 Yorkshire Bank 40.
