= De Lisle College =

Location
- Thorpe Hill; Loughborough, Leicestershire, LE11 4SQ; England; 52°46′13″N 1°14′12″W

Information
- Type: Academy
- Motto: Latin: Quod justum, non quod utile (Do what is right, not what is easy)
- Religious affiliation: Catholic
- Established: 1959
- Department for Education URN: 138298 Tables
- Ofsted: Reports
- Headteacher: Chris Maher
- Staff: 75
- Gender: Coeducational
- Age: 11 to 18
- Enrolment: 1420
- Houses: 4
- Colours: Sports: black and white. Ties: black and blue and gold diagonal stripes, navy with silver logo for sports students, navy with golden logo for headmaster's students.
- Website: https://www.delisle.org.uk/

De Lisle College (formerly De Lisle Roman Catholic Comprehensive School, then De Lisle Catholic Science College and sometimes called De Lisle School) is a co-educational secondary school with academy status in Loughborough, Leicestershire, England. According to the Ofsted website, it has 1,400 pupils. It was designated as a science specialist school in 2003. It draws the majority of its pupils from seven local Catholic primary schools, including Bishop Ellis, Sacred Heart, St Mary's, St Winefride's, St. Clare's, St Francis and Holy Cross Academy. Since September 2018, it has been a part of the St Thomas Aquinas Catholic Multi-Academy Trust.

== School traditions and other information ==
The school logo is a stag, a reference to the deer which once roamed the land the school is built on, before it was given to the county by local landowner Ambrose Lisle March Phillipps De Lisle, from whom the school also takes its name.

The school's Latin motto, "Quod justum, non quod utile" is often translated as "do what is right, not what is easy" but literally translates to "what is fair, not what is useful."

The school has four houses: Margaret Clitherow (blue), Thomas Moore (red), John Fisher (green), Ralph Sherwin (yellow), For a period, the houses were renamed after individuals with a religious legacy: Mother Teresa (blue), Oscar Romero (red), Martin Luther King Jr. (green) and St. Bernadette (yellow), though the names had reverted by sometime before September 2019.

== School buildings ==
On site facilities include a swimming pool, a library, and a cashless vending system operated by the user's thumbprint.

The school retains all of its original 1950s structures, but renovation work has been put into the Science rooms, giving them a complete refit, and the Art and Design & Technology rooms (in some cases completely remodelling them).

== Addition to the building ==
In the early 1990s, the Modern Foreign Languages block was built separately from the other school buildings next to the swimming pool, allowing the department to have its own buildings and rooms. This was dubbed the "New Block", but has reverted to the "Languages Block" with the rooms losing the "N" prefix and was firstly replaced by the "L" prefix (e.g. L2), and now the “La” prefix (e.g. La2 La1 up to 4 rooms in the block). In 2003/4, the Humanities block was built as an add-on to the science buildings, allowing the Science department to branch out.

Four mobile classrooms have also been built, taking up small portions of what used to be the main playground. These were intended as temporary units for classroom overflow, but have since become much more permanent, with new ramps to the doors. There are two rooms in each unit. The rooms have been recently refurbished and are now the main classrooms for Year 7 students. There are now four mobiles, split in half to make eight classrooms. To non-year 7 students, the mobiles serve as classrooms for an all-round general purpose, from English to Business Studies.

== In the media ==
In September 2019, an article was published in the Leicester Mercury about the school banning all smartphones from school grounds. The new rule had been brought in because the headteacher John Pye said the devices caused conflict among students. He also referred to a statement made by Amanda Spielman, HM Chief Inspector of Schools, who had backed the banning of phones in schools. The rule change caused significant controversy amongst students and parents.

The school again courted controversy in October 2021 when they were visited by a teacher branded the 'toughest' in the land. Ex-head Barry Smith was invited on a temporary basis to help with the smooth transition of pupils between classes. The visit sparked a backlash from parents, with several contacting LeicestershireLive expressing dismay and confusion over his role at the school. A great deal of dissatisfaction was expressed that a "new discipline regime" had been introduced along the lines of Smith's methods. Barry Smith had previously been removed from his school in January 2020 after 'restraining' a pupil.

In December 2021, Assistant Headteacher Simon McLone appeared at Loughborough Magistrates Court charged with 'sexual activity with a girl aged 13 to 17' and 'abusing a position of trust'. On the 8th April 2022 the Crown Prosecution Service (CPS) decided to offer no evidence in the case, which resulted in a verdict of ‘not guilty’ against McLone.

== Notable alumni ==
- Dominic Reed (b. 1990) - cricketer
- Joe Maksymiw (b. 1995) - professional rugby union player, Welsh regional side Dragons (rugby union), Irish provincial side Connacht Rugby
