= Gareth Rees (cricketer) =

Welsh cricketer

Personal information
- Full name: Gareth Peter Rees
- Born: 8 April 1985 (age 41); Swansea, Wales
- Nickname: Gums
- Height: 6 ft 1 in (1.85 m)
- Batting: Left-handed
- Bowling: Left-arm medium
- Role: Opening batsman

Domestic team information
- Years: Team
- 2003–2005: Wales Minor Counties
- 2006–2014: Glamorgan (squad no. 28)
- FC debut: 26 July 2006 Glamorgan v Gloucestershire
- LA debut: 28 August 2003 Wales Minor Counties v Denmark

Career statistics
Competition	FC	LA	T20
Matches	101	51	27
Runs scored	5,514	1,535	350
Batting average	33.21	35.69	16.66
100s/50s	13/30	3/10	0/0
Top score	154	123*	38
Balls bowled	37	3	12
Wickets	0	0	0
Bowling average	–	–	–
5 wickets in innings	–	–	–
10 wickets in match	–	–	–
Best bowling	–	–	–
Catches/stumpings	79/–	13/–	7/–
- Source: Cricinfo, 22 October 2013

Gareth Peter Rees (born 8 April 1985) is a Welsh cricketer. He is a left-handed batsman and a left-arm medium-pace bowler who played for Glamorgan.

Rees was born in Swansea. He was a prominent member of the successful Felinfoel Youth Rugby team, and represented Wales at under-17s and Llanelli under-21s. He graduated with first class honours in Maths and Physics from the University of Bath, and gained a Master's in Business Administration from the same university.

In 2003 Rees played for Wales Minor Counties and Glamorgan's 2nd XI. He finally made his County Championship debut against Gloucestershire at Cheltenham. He won his county cap in 2009. Rees also represented the MCC in the opening game of the 2012 season against Lancashire.

Rees continued to play for Glamorgan until 2014, scoring two centuries during the 2013 season in the County Championship, but did not make any appearances in the Friends Life t20. By the end of his first-class career, he had played nearly 200 matches and scored over 7,500 runs. He continued his career with an insurance company. In 2019, he was appointed a director of Glamorgan County Cricket Club.

== Career best performances ==
	Batting			
	Score	Fixture	Venue	Season
FC	154	Glamorgan v Surrey	The Oval	2009
LA	123 not out	Glamorgan v Essex	Chelmsford	2009
T20	38	Glamorgan v Essex	Chelmsford	2011
