= 2013 Yorkshire Bank 40 =

- Dates: 5 May – 9 September 2013
- Administrator: England and Wales Cricket Board
- Cricket format: Limited overs cricket (40 overs)
- Tournament format(s): Group stage and knockout
- Champions: Nottinghamshire Outlaws
- Participants: 21
- Matches: 129
- Most runs: 745 Peter Trego (Somerset)
- Most wickets: 28 Michael Hogan (Glamorgan)
- Official website: Yorkshire Bank 40

The 2013 Yorkshire Bank 40 tournament was the fourth and final season of the ECB 40 limited overs cricket competition for the English and Welsh first-class counties, plus Scotland, the Netherlands, and the Unicorns, a team of players who did not have first-class contracts.

The competition consisted of three groups of seven teams, from which the top team from each group, plus the best second-placed team, progressed to the semi-finals. The groups were allocated randomly.

In 2014, the ECB 40 was replaced with the 50-over Royal London One-Day Cup.

== Competition format ==
Group A	Group B	Group C
Kent Spitfires	Derbyshire Falcons	Glamorgan
Netherlands	Durham Dynamos	Gloucestershire Gladiators
Northamptonshire Steelbacks	Essex Eagles	Leicestershire Foxes
Nottinghamshire Outlaws	Hampshire Royals	Middlesex Panthers
Sussex Sharks	Lancashire Lightning	Somerset
Warwickshire Bears	Scottish Saltires	Unicorns
Worcestershire Royals	Surrey	Yorkshire Vikings

== Group stage ==
=== Group A ===
==== Table ====
Pos	Team	Pld	W	L	T	NR	Pts	NRR
1	Nottinghamshire Outlaws	12	9	3	0	0	18	0.457
2	Northamptonshire Steelbacks	12	8	3	0	1	17	0.393
3	Sussex Sharks	12	6	4	0	2	14	0.464
4	Kent Spitfires	12	6	6	0	0	12	0.229
5	Worcestershire Royals	12	5	7	0	0	10	0.249
6	Netherlands	12	2	7	0	3	7	−1.157
7	Warwickshire Bears	12	2	8	0	2	6	−0.929

==== Results ====
	Kent Spitfires	Netherlands	Northamptonshire Steelbacks	Nottinghamshire Outlaws	Sussex Sharks	Warwickshire Bears	Worcestershire Royals
Kent Spitfires		Kent; 8 wickets	Northamptonshire; 29 runs	Nottinghamshire; 5 wickets	Kent; 3 wickets	Warwickshire; 7 runs (D/L)	Kent; 3 wickets
Netherlands	Kent; 7 wickets (D/L)		No result	Nottinghamshire; 4 wickets	No result	No result	Worcestershire; 44 runs
Northamptonshire Steelbacks	Northamptonshire; 5 wickets	Northamptonshire; 4 wickets		Nottinghamshire; 83 runs	Sussex; 61 runs (D/L)	Northamptonshire; 36 runs	Northamptonshire; 7 wickets
Nottinghamshire Outlaws	Nottinghamshire; 7 wickets (D/L)	Nottinghamshire; 89 runs	Nottinghamshire; 6 wickets		Sussex; 50 runs	Nottinghamshire; 6 wickets	Worcestershire; 38 runs
Sussex Sharks	Sussex; 20 runs	Sussex; 9 wickets	Northamptonshire; 63 runs	Sussex; 4 wickets		Warwickshire; 8 runs	Worcestershire; 91 runs
Warwickshire Bears	Kent; 1 run	Netherlands; 5 runs	Northamptonshire; 125 runs	Nottinghamshire; 7 wickets (D/L)	No result		Worcestershire; 140 runs
Worcestershire Royals	Kent; 39 runs	Netherlands; 6 wickets	Northamptonshire; 42 runs	Nottinghamshire; 5 wickets (D/L)	Sussex; 7 wickets	Worcestershire; 9 runs	

Home team win	Away team win	Match abandoned

==== Fixtures ====
5 May
Scorecard

Nottinghamshire Outlaws; 287/4 (40 overs)	v	Northamptonshire Steelbacks (H); 204/8 (40 overs)

Nottinghamshire won by 83 runs
County Ground, Northampton

5 May
Scorecard

Worcestershire Royals; 245/9 (40 overs)	v	Sussex Sharks (H); 154 (31.5 overs)

Worcestershire won by 91 runs
County Ground, Hove

6 May
Scorecard

Kent Spitfires; 239/8 (40 overs)	v	Warwickshire Bears (H); 238 (40 overs)

Kent won by 1 run
Edgbaston, Birmingham

8 May (D/N)
Scorecard

Kent Spitfires; 220/6 (40 overs)	v	Nottinghamshire Outlaws (H); 140/3 (16.3/19 overs)

Nottinghamshire won by 7 wickets (D/L)
Trent Bridge, Nottingham

10 May
Scorecard

(H) Netherlands; 101 (32.1/39 overs)	v	Kent Spitfires; 102/3 (22.5/39 overs)

Kent won by 7 wickets (D/L)
Sportpark Het Schootsveld, Deventer

10 May (D/N)
Scorecard

Sussex Sharks; 215/7 (40 overs)	v	Northamptonshire Steelbacks (H); 122/9 (26.3 overs)

Sussex won by 61 runs (D/L)
County Ground, Northampton

12 May
Scorecard

(H) Warwickshire Bears	v	Sussex Sharks

Match abandoned without a ball bowled
Edgbaston, Birmingham

12 May
Scorecard

(H) Worcestershire Royals; 132/5 (16/16 overs)	v	Nottinghamshire Outlaws; 129/5 (15.2/16 overs, target 127)

Nottinghamshire won by 5 wickets (D/L)
New Road, Worcester

15 May (D/N)
Scorecard

Worcestershire Royals; 110/9 (25/25 overs)	v	Kent Spitfires (H); 111/7 (23.1/25 overs)

Kent won by 3 wickets
St Lawrence Ground, Canterbury

20 May
Scorecard

(H) Netherlands; 28/2 (10.2 overs)	v	Sussex Sharks

Match abandoned
Sportpark Thurlede, Schiedam

21 May
Scorecard

(H) Netherlands	v	Northamptonshire Steelbacks

Match abandoned without a ball bowled
Sportpark Thurlede, Schiedam

23 May (D/N)
Scorecard

(H) Warwickshire Bears; 186/7 (30/30 overs)	v	Nottinghamshire Outlaws; 133/3 (19.3/21 overs, target 133)

Nottinghamshire won by 7 wickets (D/L)
Edgbaston, Birmingham

26 May
Scorecard

(H) Nottinghamshire Outlaws; 263/5 (40 overs)	v	Netherlands; 174 (38.1 overs)

Nottinghamshire won by 89 runs
Trent Bridge, Nottingham

26 May
Scorecard

(H) Sussex Sharks; 222/9 (40 overs)	v	Kent Spitfires; 202 (39.2 overs)

Sussex won by 20 runs
Cricket Field Road Ground, Horsham

26 May
Scorecard

Northamptonshire Steelbacks; 219/6 (40 overs)	v	Worcestershire Royals (H); 177 (37.4 overs)

Northamptonshire won by 42 runs
New Road, Worcester

27 May
Scorecard

Netherlands; 249/5 (40 overs)	v	Kent Spitfires (H); 250/2 (35.4 overs)

Kent won by 8 wickets
Nevill Ground, Tunbridge Wells

27 May
Scorecard

(H) Northamptonshire Steelbacks; 229/9 (40 overs)	v	Warwickshire Bears; 193 (37.3 overs)

Northamptonshire won by 36 runs
County Ground, Northampton

30 May (D/N)
Scorecard

Warwickshire Bears; 157/7 (21/21 overs)	v	Sussex Sharks (H); 149/7 (21/21 overs)

Warwickshire won by 8 runs
County Ground, Hove

1 June
Scorecard

Worcestershire Royals (H); 210/9 (40 overs)	v	Warwickshire Bears; 201 (38.3 overs)

Worcestershire won by 9 runs
New Road, Worcester

2 June
Scorecard

Northamptonshire Steelbacks; 263/4 (40 overs)	v	Kent Spitfires (H); 234 (39.4 overs)

Northamptonshire won by 29 runs
Nevill Ground, Tunbridge Wells

3 June
Scorecard

Worcestershire Royals; 293/4 (40 overs)	v	Netherlands (H); 249 (38 overs)

Worcestershire won by 44 runs
Hazelaarweg, Rotterdam

16 June
Scorecard

Warwickshire Bears; 238/7 (40 overs)	v	Nottinghamshire Outlaws (H); 243/4 (39.1 overs)

Nottinghamshire won by 6 wickets
Trent Bridge, Nottingham

16 June
Scorecard

Northamptonshire Steelbacks; 191/6 (39/39 overs)	v	Sussex Sharks (H); 128 (34.3/39 overs)

Northamptonshire won by 63 runs
Arundel Castle Cricket Ground. Arundel

16 June
Scorecard

Worcestershire Royals (H); 90/6 (18/18 overs)	v	Netherlands; 92/4 (18/18 overs)

Netherlands won by 6 wickets
New Road, Worcester

19 June
Scorecard

Netherlands (H); 188/7 (40 overs)	v	Nottinghamshire Outlaws; 190/6 (38.5 overs)

Nottinghamshire won by 4 wickets
Boscawen Park, Truro

19 June (D/N)
Scorecard

Sussex Sharks; 336/5 (40 overs)	v	Kent Spitfires (H); 337/7 (38.3 overs)

Kent won by 3 wickets
St Lawrence Ground, Canterbury

21 June
Scorecard

Netherlands (H)	v	Warwickshire Bears

Match abandoned without a ball bowled
VRA Cricket Ground, Amstelveen

21 June (D/N)
Scorecard

Sussex Sharks; 223/9 (40 overs)	v	Nottinghamshire Outlaws (H); 173 (35.5 overs)

Sussex won by 50 runs
Trent Bridge, Nottingham

24 June (D/N)
Scorecard

Worcestershire Royals; 187/8 (40 overs)	v	Northamptonshire Steelbacks (H); 188/3 (33.5 overs)

Northamptonshire won by 7 wickets
County Ground, Northampton

11 August
Scorecard

Northamptonshire Steelbacks; 205/9 (40 overs)	v	Nottinghamshire Outlaws (H); 207/4 (32.2 overs)

Nottinghamshire won by 6 wickets
Trent Bridge, Nottingham

11 August
Scorecard

Netherlands; 248/7 (40 overs)	v	Warwickshire Bears (H); 243/8 (40 overs)

Netherlands won by 5 runs
Edgbaston, Birmingham

11 August
Scorecard

Kent Spitfires; 289/6 (40 overs)	v	Worcestershire Royals (H); 250 (39.5 overs)

Kent won by 39 runs
New Road, Worcester

13 August (D/N)
Scorecard

Kent Spitfires; 188/7 (40 overs)	v	Northamptonshire Steelbacks (H); 189/5 (39.4 overs)

Northamptonshire won by 5 wickets
County Ground, Northampton

13 August (D/N)
Scorecard

Worcestershire Royals; 220/8 (37/37 overs)	v	Nottinghamshire Outlaws (H); 182 (33/37 overs)

Worcestershire won by 38 runs
Trent Bridge, Nottingham

13 August (D/N)
Scorecard

Netherlands; 185 (35.4 overs)	v	Sussex Sharks (H); 188/1 (21.2 overs)

Sussex won by 9 wickets
County Ground, Hove

15 August (D/N)
Scorecard

Warwickshire Bears; 213/7 (40 overs)	v	Kent Spitfires (H); 113/4 (24.3/24.3 overs, target 121)

Warwickshire won by 7 runs (D/L)
St Lawrence Ground, Canterbury

15 August (D/N)
Scorecard

Nottinghamshire Outlaws; 290/5 (40 overs)	v	Sussex Sharks (H); 293/6 (38.3 overs)

Sussex won by 4 wickets
County Ground, Hove

15 August (D/N)
Scorecard

Netherlands; 176/8 (40 overs)	v	Northamptonshire Steelbacks (H); 178/6 (36.5 overs)

Northamptonshire won by 4 wickets
County Ground, Northampton

19 August (D/N)
Scorecard

Worcestershire Royals; 291/9 (40 overs)	v	Warwickshire Bears (H); 151 (35.5 overs)

Worcestershire won by 140 runs
Edgbaston, Birmingham

26 August
Scorecard

Kent Spitfires (H); 195/6 (40 overs)	v	Nottinghamshire Outlaws; 199/5 (38.2 overs)

Nottinghamshire won by 5 wickets
St Lawrence Ground, Canterbury

26 August
Scorecard

Northamptonshire Steelbacks; 324/6 (40 overs)	v	Warwickshire Bears (H); 199 (31.1 overs)

Northamptonshire won by 125 runs
Edgbaston, Birmingham

26 August
Scorecard

Worcestershire Royals (H); 243/6 (40 overs)	v	Sussex Sharks; 246/3 (28.2 overs)

Sussex won by 7 wickets
New Road, Worcester

=== Group B ===
==== Table ====
Pos	Team	Pld	W	L	T	NR	Pts	NRR
1	Hampshire Royals	12	9	3	0	0	18	0.734
2	Essex Eagles	12	8	4	0	0	16	0.972
3	Lancashire Lightning	12	7	4	0	1	15	−0.023
4	Durham Dynamos	12	7	4	0	1	14.75	0.657
5	Surrey	12	4	6	0	2	10	−0.524
6	Derbyshire Falcons	12	3	6	0	3	9	−0.250
7	Scottish Saltires	12	0	11	0	1	1	−1.940

Durham were deducted 0.25 points for breach of team salary payments in 2012.

==== Results ====
	Derbyshire Falcons	Durham Dynamos	Essex Eagles	Hampshire Royals	Lancashire Lightning	Scottish Saltires	Surrey
Derbyshire Falcons		Derbyshire; 107 runs	Derbyshire; 63 runs	Hampshire; 41 runs	No result	No result	No result
Durham Dynamos	Durham; 43 runs (D/L)		Essex; 4 wickets	Durham; 6 wickets (D/L)	Durham; 39 runs	Durham; 7 wickets	Durham; 133 runs
Essex Eagles	Essex; 107 runs	Essex; 6 wickets		Hampshire; 9 wickets	Lancashire; 64 runs	Essex; 125 runs	Essex; 178 runs
Hampshire Royals	Hampshire; 46 runs	Hampshire; 5 wickets	Hampshire; 30 runs		Hampshire; 9 wickets	Hampshire; 5 wickets	Hampshire; 3 wickets
Lancashire Lightning	Lancashire; 6 wickets	Durham; 5 wickets	Essex; 70 runs	Lancashire; 5 runs		Lancashire; 7 wickets	Lancashire; 7 runs
Scottish Saltires	Derbyshire; 6 wickets	Durham; 8 wickets (D/L)	Essex; 59 runs	Hampshire; 9 wickets	Lancashire; 7 wickets (D/L)		Surrey; 14 runs
Surrey	Surrey; 3 wickets	No result	Essex; 7 wickets	Surrey; 9 wickets	Lancashire; 5 wickets	Surrey; 100 runs	

Home team win	Away team win	Match abandoned

==== Fixtures ====
3 May (D/N)
Scorecard

(H) Essex Eagles; 244/7 (40 overs)	v	Hampshire Royals; 245/1 (29.4 overs)

Hampshire won by 9 wickets
County Ground, Chelmsford

5 May
Scorecard

(H) Durham Dynamos; 209/5 (40 overs)	v	Essex Eagles; 212/6 (39 overs)

Essex won by 4 wickets
Riverside Ground, Chester-le-Street

5 May
Scorecard

Scottish Saltires; 192/7 (40 overs)	v	Hampshire Royals (H); 194/5 (37.3 overs)

Hampshire won by 5 wickets
The Rose Bowl, Southampton

6 May
Scorecard

(H) Lancashire Lightning; 216/9 (40 overs)	v	Durham Dynamos; 218/5 (34.5 overs)

Durham won by 5 wickets
Old Trafford, Manchester

6 May
Scorecard

Hampshire Royals; 228 (40 overs)	v	Surrey (H); 229/1 (31.2 overs)

Surrey won by 9 wickets
The Oval, London

9 May (D/N)
Scorecard

(H) Surrey; 216 (37.3 overs)	v	Durham Dynamos

Match abandoned
The Oval, London

12 May
Scorecard

(H) Derbyshire Falcons; 12/0 (3 overs)	v	Lancashire Lightning

Match abandoned
County Ground, Derby

12 May
Scorecard

Essex Eagles; 217/7 (29/29 overs)	v	Scottish Saltires (H); 158/4 (29/29 overs)

Essex won by 59 runs
The Grange, Edinburgh

19 May
Scorecard

Durham Dynamos; 241/8 (36/36 overs)	v	Hampshire Royals (H); 242/5 (35.1/36 overs)

Hampshire won by 5 wickets
The Rose Bowl, Southampton

19 May
Scorecard

(H) Lancashire Lightning; 176/9 (40 overs)	v	Surrey; 169 (40 overs)

Lancashire won by 7 runs
Old Trafford, Manchester

22 May (D/N)
Scorecard

Lancashire Lightning; 244/6 (40 overs)	v	Hampshire Royals (H); 250/1 (34 overs)

Hampshire won by 9 wickets
The Rose Bowl, Southampton

26 May
Scorecard

(H) Scottish Saltires; 182/9 (40 overs)	v	Derbyshire Falcons; 186/4 (37.4 overs)

Derbyshire won by 6 wickets
The Grange, Edinburgh

27 May
Scorecard

(H) Durham Dynamos; 273/6 (40 overs)	v	Derbyshire Falcons; 70/3 (16/16 overs, target 114)

Durham won by 43 runs (D/L)
Riverside Ground, Chester-le-Street

27 May
Scorecard

Surrey; 237/5 (40 overs)	v	Scottish Saltires (H); 223/8 (40 overs)

Surrey won by 14 runs
The Grange, Edinburgh

29 May (D/N)
Scorecard

Surrey; 100/1 (9/19 overs)	v	Derbyshire Falcons (H)

Match abandoned
County Ground, Derby

2 June
Scorecard

Durham Dynamos (H); 297/9 (40 overs)	v	Lancashire Lightning; 258 (36.1 overs)

Durham won by 39 runs
Riverside Ground, Chester-le-Street

2 June
Scorecard

Essex Eagles (H); 368/7 (40 overs)	v	Scottish Saltires; 243/8 (40 overs)

Essex won by 125 runs
County Ground, Chelmsford

3 June (D/N)
Scorecard

Essex Eagles (H); 312/7 (40 overs)	v	Surrey; 134 (29.5 overs)

Essex won by 178 runs
County Ground, Chelmsford

9 June
Scorecard

Derbyshire Falcons (H); 321/5 (40 overs)	v	Essex Eagles; 258 (33.1 overs)

Derbyshire won by 63 runs
Highfield, Leek

9 June
Scorecard

Surrey (H); 264/8 (40 overs)	v	Lancashire Lightning; 265/5 (37.3 overs)

Lancashire won by 5 wickets
Woodbridge Road, Guildford

16 June
Scorecard

Scottish Saltires; 91 (23.3 overs)	v	Durham Dynamos (H); 93/3 (12.5 overs)

Durham won by 7 wickets
Riverside Ground, Chester-le-Street

16 June
Scorecard

Lancashire Lightning; 230/8 (40 overs)	v	Essex Eagles (H); 166 (34.3 overs)

Lancashire won by 64 runs
County Ground, Chelmsford

18 June (D/N)
Scorecard

Hampshire Royals (H); 277/8 (40 overs)	v	Derbyshire Falcons; 231/8 (40 overs)

Hampshire won by 46 runs
The Rose Bowl, Southampton

18 June (D/N)
Scorecard

Scottish Saltires (H); 217/9 (40 overs)	v	Lancashire Lightning; 218/3 (36.3 overs)

Lancashire won by 7 wickets
Old Trafford, Manchester

20 June (D/N)
Scorecard

Derbyshire Falcons (H); 36/2 (9.3 overs)	v	Scottish Saltires

Match abandoned
County Ground, Derby

22 June
Scorecard

Hampshire Royals; 224/9 (40 overs)	v	Durham Dynamos (H); 218/4 (35.2/28 overs, target 218)

Durham won by 6 wickets (D/L)
Riverside Ground, Chester-le-Street

2 August (D/N)
Scorecard

Surrey (H); 223/7 (40 overs)	v	Essex Eagles; 226/3 (35.1 overs)

Essex won by 7 wickets
The Oval, London

4 August
Scorecard

Surrey (H); 303 (39.1 overs)	v	Scottish Saltires; 203 (35.1 overs)

Surrey won by 100 runs
The Oval, London

11 August
Scorecard

Hampshire Royals (H); 216 (39.2 overs)	v	Essex Eagles; 186 (38.1 overs)

Hampshire won by 30 runs
The Rose Bowl, Southampton

11 August
Scorecard

Scottish Saltires (H); 161/6 (37/37 overs)	v	Durham Dynamos; 106/2 (16.1/20 overs, target 104)

Durham won by 8 wickets (D/L)
Titwood, Glasgow

11 August
Scorecard

Derbyshire Falcons; 294/9 (40 overs)	v	Surrey (H); 297/7 (40 overs)

Surrey won by 3 wickets
The Oval, London

13 August
Scorecard

Scottish Saltires (H); 136 (40 overs)	v	Hampshire Royals; 137/1 (15.1 overs)

Hampshire won by 9 wickets
Titwood, Glasgow

13 August (D/N)
Scorecard

Durham Dynamos; 138 (34.1 overs)	v	Essex Eagles (H); 139/4 (26.3 overs)

Essex won by 6 wickets
County Ground, Chelmsford

13 August (D/N)
Scorecard

Derbyshire Falcons; 190/9 (40 overs)	v	Lancashire Lightning (H); 196/4 (35.4 overs)

Lancashire won by 6 wickets
Old Trafford, Manchester

15 August
Scorecard

Scottish Saltires (H); 145 (35.4/36 overs)	v	Lancashire Lightning; 125/3 (23.8/28 overs, target 125)

Lancashire won by 7 wickets (D/L)
Titwood, Glasgow

15 August (D/N)
Scorecard

Surrey; 219/9 (40 overs)	v	Hampshire Royals (H); 220/7 (38.4 overs)

Hampshire won by 3 wickets
The Rose Bowl, Southampton

15 August (D/N)
Scorecard

Derbyshire Falcons (H); 217/8 (40 overs)	v	Durham Dynamos; 110 (28.4 overs)

Durham won by 107 runs
County Ground, Derby

20 August (D/N)
Scorecard

Lancashire Lightning (H); 261/9 (40 overs)	v	Hampshire Royals; 256/8 (40 overs)

Lancashire won by 5 runs
Old Trafford, Manchester

25 August
Scorecard

Essex Eagles (H); 259/7 (40 overs)	v	Derbyshire Falcons; 152 (31.1 overs)

Essex won by 107 runs
Castle Park Cricket Ground, Colchester

26 August
Scorecard

Hampshire Royals; 219/7 (40 overs)	v	Derbyshire Falcons (H); 178 (35.5 overs)

Hampshire won by 41 runs
County Ground, Derby

26 August
Scorecard

Durham Dynamos (H); 275/5 (40 overs)	v	Surrey; 142 (30.5 overs)

Durham won by 133 runs
Riverside Ground, Chester-le-Street

26 August
Scorecard

Essex Eagles; 297/4 (40 overs)	v	Lancashire Lightning (H); 227 (36.4 overs)

Essex won by 70 runs
Old Trafford, Manchester

=== Group C ===
==== Table ====
Pos	Team	Pld	W	L	T	NR	Pts	NRR
1	Somerset	12	8	3	0	1	17	1.006
2	Glamorgan	12	8	3	0	1	17	0.576
3	Middlesex Panthers	12	7	4	0	1	15	0.315
4	Gloucestershire Gladiators	12	7	4	0	1	15	0.163
5	Leicestershire Foxes	12	5	7	0	0	10	−0.353
6	Yorkshire Vikings	12	3	9	0	0	6	−0.468
7	Unicorns	12	1	9	0	2	4	−1.196

==== Results ====
	Glamorgan	Gloucestershire Gladiators	Leicestershire Foxes	Middlesex Panthers	Somerset	Unicorns	Yorkshire Vikings
Glamorgan		Gloucestershire; 7 runs	Glamorgan; 68 runs	Glamorgan; 11 runs	Glamorgan; 1 wicket	No result	Glamorgan; 28 runs
Gloucestershire Gladiators	Gloucestershire; 2 wickets		Gloucestershire; 7 wickets	No result	Somerset; 12 runs	Gloucestershire; 29 runs	Gloucestershire; 36 runs
Leicestershire Foxes	Glamorgan; 34 runs	Leicestershire; 115 runs		Middlesex; 10 wickets	Leicestershire; 6 wickets	Unicorns; 42 runs	Leicestershire; 3 wickets
Middlesex Panthers	Glamorgan; 26 runs	Middlesex; 19 runs (D/L)	Middlesex; 4 wickets		Middlesex; 4 wickets	Middlesex; 1 wicket	Middlesex; 6 wickets
Somerset	Somerset; 3 wickets	Somerset; 7 wickets	Somerset; 5 wickets	Somerset; 6 wickets		Somerset; 8 wickets	Somerset; 3 wickets
Unicorns	Glamorgan; 85 runs	Gloucestershire; 9 wickets	Leicestershire; 6 wickets	Middlesex; 9 wickets	No result		Yorkshire; 5 wickets
Yorkshire Vikings	Glamorgan; 4 wickets	Gloucestershire; 5 wickets	Leicestershire; 3 wickets	Yorkshire; 17 runs (D/L)	Somerset; 131 runs	Yorkshire; 32 runs	

Home team win	Away team win	Match abandoned

==== Fixtures ====
4 May
Scorecard

(H) Leicestershire Foxes; 289 (40 overs)	v	Gloucestershire Gladiators; 174 (34.1 overs)

Leicestershire won by 115 runs
Grace Road, Leicester

5 May
Scorecard

(H) Glamorgan; 285/7 (40 overs)	v	Yorkshire Vikings; 257 (38.2 overs)

Glamorgan won by 28 runs
Penrhyn Avenue, Rhos-on-Sea

5 May
Scorecard

Unicorns; 183/8 (40 overs)	v	Somerset (H); 184/2 (15.3 overs)

Somerset won by 8 wickets
County Ground, Taunton

6 May
Scorecard

Glamorgan; 280/3 (40 overs)	v	Middlesex Panthers (H); 254/9 (40 overs)

Glamorgan won by 26 runs
Lord's, London

6 May
Scorecard

(H) Unicorns; 153/9 (40 overs)	v	Gloucestershire Gladiators; 156/1 (23.2 overs)

Gloucestershire won by 9 wickets
Sir Paul Getty's Ground, Wormsley

11 May
Scorecard

Somerset; 338/5 (40 overs)	v	Yorkshire Vikings (H); 207 (30 overs)

Somerset won by 131 runs
Headingley, Leeds

12 May
Scorecard

(H) Glamorgan	v	Unicorns

Match abandoned without a ball bowled
SWALEC Stadium, Cardiff

12 May
Scorecard

(H) Gloucestershire Gladiators	v	Middlesex Panthers

Match abandoned
County Ground, Bristol

19 May
Scorecard

Gloucestershire Gladiators; 288/5 (40 overs)	v	Glamorgan (H); 281/6 (40 overs)

Gloucestershire won by 7 runs
SWALEC Stadium, Cardiff

19 May
Scorecard

Middlesex Panthers; 252/9 (40 overs)	v	Somerset (H); 257/4 (35.5 overs)

Somerset won by 6 wickets
County Ground, Taunton

19 May
Scorecard

(H) Unicorns; 189/9 (40 overs)	v	Yorkshire Vikings; 191/5 (38.5 overs)

Yorkshire won by 5 wickets
Queen's Park, Chesterfield

26 May
Scorecard

(H) Gloucestershire Gladiators; 260/7 (40 overs)	v	Unicorns; 231/5 (40 overs)

Gloucestershire won by 29 runs
County Ground, Bristol

26 May
Scorecard

Somerset; 323/3 (40 overs)	v	Leicestershire Foxes (H); 324/4 (38.5 overs)

Leicestershire won by 6 wickets
Grace Road, Leicester

27 May
Scorecard

Yorkshire Vikings; 236/8 (40 overs)	v	Middlesex Panthers (H); 237/4 (35.4 overs)

Middlesex won by 6 wickets
Radlett Cricket Club, Radlett

27 May
Scorecard

(H) Unicorns; 253/8 (40 overs)	v	Leicestershire Foxes; 256/4 (39 overs)

Leicestershire won by 6 wickets
Sir Paul Getty's Ground, Wormsley

2 June
Scorecard

Leicestershire Foxes (H); 220 (39.5 overs)	v	Middlesex Panthers; 221/0 (30.2 overs)

Middlesex won by 10 wickets
Grace Road, Leicester

2 June
Scorecard

Glamorgan; 245/9 (40 overs)	v	Somerset (H); 246/7 (38.2 overs)

Somerset won by 3 wickets
County Ground, Taunton

2 June
Scorecard

Yorkshire Vikings (H); 240/6 (40 overs)	v	Gloucestershire Gladiators; 243/5 (38.1 overs)

Gloucestershire won by 5 wickets
Headingley, Leeds

4 June (D/N)
Scorecard

Somerset; 247/7 (40 overs)	v	Middlesex Panthers (H); 250/6 (39.1 overs)

Middlesex won by 4 wickets
Lord's, London

9 June
Scorecard

Glamorgan; 300/6 (40 overs)	v	Unicorns (H); 215/9 (40 overs)

Glamorgan won by 85 runs
Garons Park, Southend-on-Sea

9 June
Scorecard

Yorkshire Vikings (H); 258/9 (40 overs)	v	Leicestershire Foxes; 260/7 (39.1 overs)

Leicestershire won by 3 wickets
North Marine Road Ground, Scarborough

14 June
Scorecard

Unicorns (H); 231/8 (40 overs)	v	Somerset; 22/0 (2/32 overs, target 206)

No result
Boscawen Park, Truro

16 June
Scorecard

Gloucestershire Gladiators (H); 229/6 (27/27 overs)	v	Yorkshire Vikings; 193 (26.3/27 overs)

Gloucestershire won by 36 runs
County Ground, Bristol

16 June
Scorecard

Leicestershire Foxes; 124 (24.3/25 overs)	v	Somerset (H); 127/5 (21.3/overs)

Somerset won by 5 wickets
County Ground, Taunton

19 June
Scorecard

Glamorgan; 265/8 (40 overs)	v	Leicestershire Foxes (H); 231 (39.5 overs)

Glamorgan won by 34 runs
Grace Road, Leicester

20 June
Scorecard

Middlesex Panthers; 217/8 (40 overs)	v	Yorkshire Vikings (H); 81/0 (17.2/17.2 overs, target 65)

Yorkshire won by 17 runs (D/L)
Headingley, Leeds

23 June
Scorecard

Unicorns (H); 170 (36.4 overs)	v	Middlesex Panthers; 172/1 (27.5 overs)

Middlesex won by 9 wickets
Garons Park, Southend-on-Sea

11 August
Scorecard

Yorkshire Vikings; 228/7 (40 overs)	v	Leicestershire Foxes (H); 232/7 (39.5 overs)

Leicestershire won by 3 wickets
Grace Road, Leicester

11 August
Scorecard

Unicorns; 208/7 (40 overs)	v	Middlesex Panthers (H); 209/9 (39.1 overs)

Middlesex won by 1 wicket
Lord's, London

11 August
Scorecard

Gloucestershire Gladiators; 263/8 (40 overs)	v	Somerset (H); 267/3 (33.3 overs)

Somerset won by 7 wickets
County Ground, Taunton

12 August (D/N)
Scorecard

Somerset; 222/8 (40 overs)	v	Glamorgan (H); 226/9 (39.3 overs)

Glamorgan won by 1 wicket
SWALEC Stadium, Cardiff

13 August
Scorecard

Leicestershire Foxes; 163 (35.2 overs)	v	Gloucestershire Gladiators (H); 164/3 (30.2 overs)

Gloucestershire won by 7 wickets
County Ground, Bristol

13 August
Scorecard

Yorkshire Vikings (H); 266/6 (40 overs)	v	Unicorns; 234 (38.2 overs)

Yorkshire won by 32 runs
Headingley, Leeds

14 August (D/N)
Scorecard

Glamorgan (H); 153/9 (25/25 overs)	v	Middlesex Panthers; 142/9 (25/25 overs)

Glamorgan won by 11 runs
SWALEC Stadium, Cardiff

15 August
Scorecard

Yorkshire Vikings; 261/8 (40 overs)	v	Somerset (H); 262/7 (39.1 overs)

Somerset won by 3 wickets
Recreation Ground, Bath

15 August (D/N)
Scorecard

Middlesex Panthers (H); 206/5 (38/38 overs)	v	Gloucestershire Gladiators; 186/9 (38/38 overs)

Middlesex own by 19 runs (D/L)
Lord's, London

18 August
Scorecard

Glamorgan; 247/7 (40 overs)	v	Gloucestershire Gladiators (H); 251/8 (39.5 overs)

Gloucestershire won by 2 wickets
County Ground, Bristol

18 August
Scorecard

Unicorns; 259/5 (40 overs)	v	Leicestershire Foxes (H); 217 (39 overs)

Unicorns won by 42 runs
Grace Road, Leicester

25 August
Scorecard

Glamorgan (H); 303/6 (40 overs)	v	Leicestershire Foxes; 235/6 (40 overs)

Glamorgan won by 68 runs
St. Helen's, Swansea

26 August
Scorecard

Somerset; 258/9 (40 overs)	v	Gloucestershire Gladiators (H); 246/7 (40 overs)

Somerset won by 12 runs
County Ground, Bristol

26 August
Scorecard

Leicestershire Foxes; 274/8 (40 overs)	v	Middlesex Panthers (H); 275/6 (38.2 overs)

Middlesex won by 4 wickets
Lord's, London

26 August
Scorecard

Yorkshire Vikings (H); 215/5 (40 overs)	v	Glamorgan; 216/6 (38.5 overs)

Glamorgan won by 4 wickets
Headingley, Leeds

== Knockout stage ==
Semi-finals
1	Hampshire Royals	203/8
4	Glamorgan	234/4
3	Nottinghamshire Outlaws	122/2
2	Somerset	119

Final
Glamorgan	157
Nottinghamshire Outlaws	244/8

=== Semi-finals ===
7 September
12:45
Scorecard

Glamorgan; 234/4 (40 overs)	v	Hampshire Royals (H); 203/8 (40 overs)
Jim Allenby 74 (71); Sohail Tanvir 2/40 (8 overs)		James Adams 59 (83); Michael Hogan 4/51 (8 overs)

Glamorgan won by 31 runs
The Rose Bowl, Southampton
Umpires: Peter Hartley and David Millns
Player of the match: Jim Allenby (Glamorgan)

- Hampshire won the toss and elected to field.

9 September
16:10 (D/N)
Scorecard

Somerset; 119 (25.4 overs)	v	Nottinghamshire Outlaws (H); 122/2 (16.2 overs)
Peter Trego 40 (53); Jake Ball 4/25 (5 overs)		Michael Lumb 46 (38); Jamie Overton 1/35 (4 overs)

Nottinghamshire won by 8 wickets
Trent Bridge, Nottingham
Umpires: Trevor Jesty and Jeremy Lloyds
Player of the match: Jake Ball (Nottinghamshire)

- Nottinghamshire won the toss and elected to field.

=== Final ===
21 September
11:30
Scorecard

Nottinghamshire Outlaws; 244/8 (40 overs)	v	Glamorgan; 157 (33 overs)
Chris Read 53 (52); Simon Jones 2/36 (8 overs)		Chris Cooke 46 (44); Samit Patel 3/21 (7 overs)

Nottinghamshire won by 87 runs
Lord's, London
Umpires: Peter Hartley and Richard Kettleborough
Player of the match: Samit Patel (Nottinghamshire)

- Glamorgan won the toss and elected to field

== See also ==
- ECB 40
