= Penrhyn Avenue =

Cricket ground in Rhos-on-Sea, Wales

Colwyn Bay Cricket Club Ground
- Penrhyn Avenue
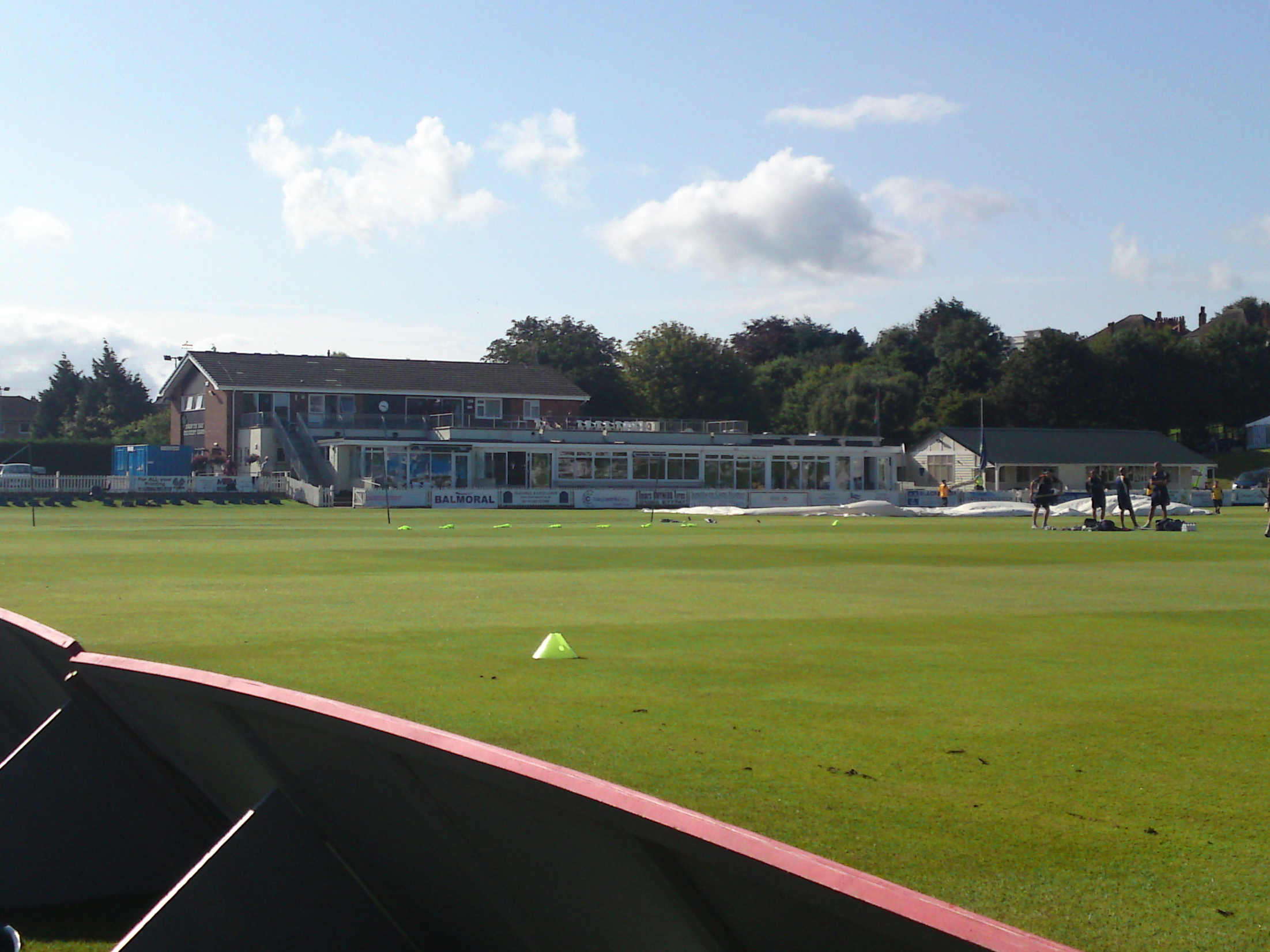
- Interactive map of Colwyn Bay Cricket Club Ground

Ground information
- Location: Rhos-on-Sea, Wales
- Country: Wales
- Coordinates: 53°18′41″N 3°44′45″W
- Establishment: 1924
- Capacity: 4,750
- Owner: Colwyn Bay Cricket Club
- End names
- Penrhyn Avenue End; The Embankment End

Team information
| Colwyn Bay | (1924–) |
| Denbighshire | (1930–1935) |
| Glamorgan | (1966–) |
| Wales Minor Counties | (1988–) |
- As of 9 August 2009; Source: CricketArchive

Penrhyn Avenue is a cricket ground in Rhos-on-Sea, Wales. The ground was first used by the Glamorgan 1st XI in 1966, although County Championship matches have only been an annual fixture since 1990 (with the exception of 1991 and 1996). In 2015, the ground hosted a County Championship match against Lancashire, during which Lancashire batsmen Ashwell Prince and Alviro Petersen put on a ground record partnership of 501 for the third wicket. The ground was most recently used by Glamorgan in 2019 for a County Championship match, against Lancashire. A proposed game in 2022 was moved to Cardiff and Glamorgan did not play at Penrhyn Avenue in 2023 or 2024.

The ground has hosted 32 first-class matches and 28 List A matches, as well as several matches in the Minor Counties Championship, both for Denbighshire and the Wales Minor Counties.

== Records ==
=== First-class ===
- Highest team score – 718/3dec Glamorgan v. Sussex, 22–25 August 2000
- Lowest team score – 118 Derbyshire v. Glamorgan, 27–30 August 1966
- Best batting performance – 309 not out Steve James for Glamorgan v. Sussex, 22–25 August 2000
- Best bowling performance – 9/49 Tony Cordle for Glamorgan v. Leicestershire, 21–24 June 1969

=== List A ===
- Highest team score – 328/4 – Glamorgan Dragons v. Lancashire Lightning, 21 August 2011
- Lowest team score – 105 Durham v. Glamorgan, 20 June 1993
- Best batting performance – 144 Jacques Du Toit for Leicestershire Foxes v. Glamorgan Dragons, 10 August 2008 & Alviro Petersen for Glamorgan Dragons v. Lancashire Lightning, 21 August 2011
- Best bowling performance – 6/22 Adrian Dale for Glamorgan v. Durham, 20 June 1993
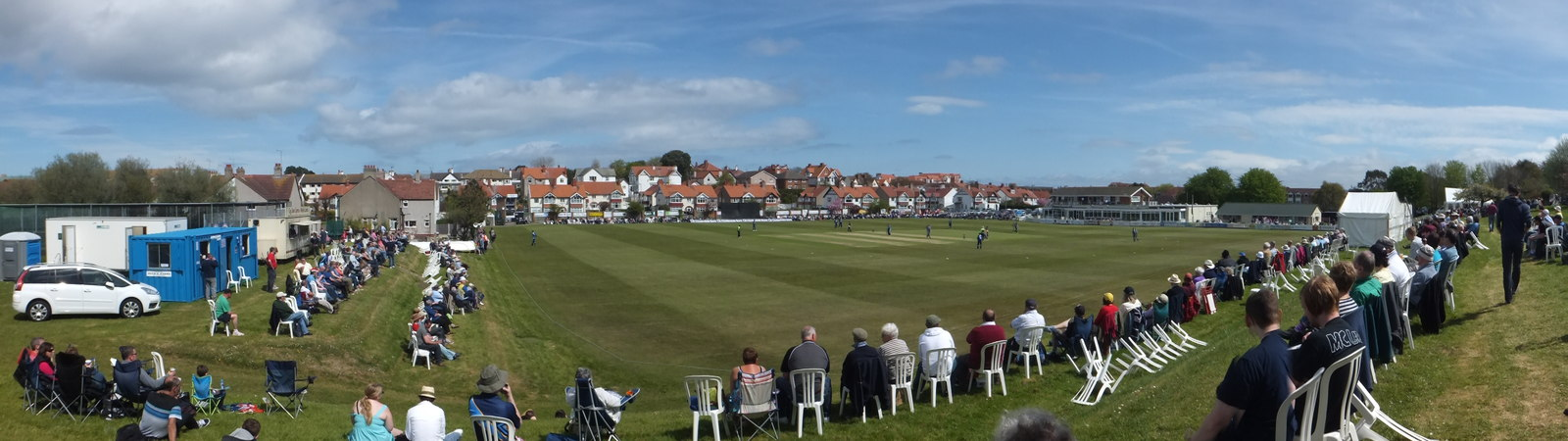
Panorama of the Colwyn Bay Cricket Club ground
