= Denbighshire County Cricket Club =

Welsh cricket team

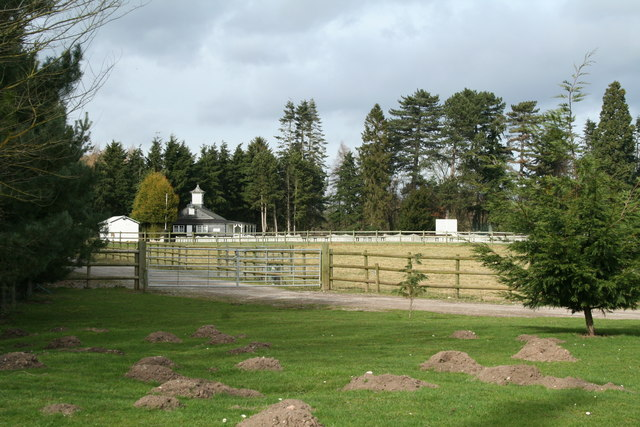
The cricket ground at the Marchwiel Estate was one of Denbighshire's home grounds

Denbighshire County Cricket Club was a county cricket club based in the historic Welsh county of Denbighshire, that played in the Minor Counties Championship for five seasons, from 1930 to 1935 (missing the 1932 season). The side was unsuccessful, and in its final season it lost each of its eight matches, six of them by an innings. It finished bottom of the championship table in each of its seasons.

After the 1935 season, the side disbanded. Although it considered forming a Gentlemen of Denbighshire team for eventual readmission to the Minor Counties (see Wisden Cricketers' Almanack, 1936 edition), that did not happen. The county played matches around Denbighshire, at Marchwiel, Chirk and Brymbo. It played the majority of its home matches at Penrhyn Avenue, Colwyn Bay.

== Notable players ==
See Category:Denbighshire cricketers
