= Glamorgan County Cricket Club in 2005 =

Glamorgan
2005 season
- Coach: John Derrick
- Captain: Robert Croft
- Ground(s): Sophia Gardens, Cardiff; Swansea; Abergavenny; Colwyn Bay
- County Championship: 9th, Division One
- totesport League: 4th, Division One
- Twenty20 Cup: 6th, Mid/Wales/West
- C&G Trophy: Second round
- Most runs: FC: David Hemp (1,369); LA: Mike Powell (488); T20: Matthew Elliott (213)
- Most wickets: FC: Robert Croft (43); LA: David Harrison (23); T20: Robert Croft (9)
- Most catches: FC: Alex Wharf (10); Jonathan Hughes (10); LA: Mike Powell (14); T20: Dean Cosker (4)
- Most wicket-keeping dismissals: FC: Mark Wallace (31 ct + 4 st); LA: Mark Wallace (20 ct + 4 st); T20: Mark Wallace (4 ct + 0 st)

Glamorgan County Cricket Club started their 2005 season as defending totesport League champions, but the 2005 season ended without a trophy – instead, they suffered relegation in the first-class form. They played their first-class cricket in the First Division of the County Championship. They started the Championship season at 25–1 to win, and favourites to be relegated – which they eventually were, winning one of 16 games in the Championship season to finish bottom – nearly 100 points behind the first team to avoid relegation. By the end of August, they had confirmed relegation with three games remaining. In the National League, they hovered around mid-table for most of the season, before a run of three unbeaten games at the end of August sent them out of the relegation zone, and they finished the season in fourth place. In the C&G Trophy, they were knocked out at the second round stage by eventual champions Hampshire, while the Twenty20 campaign saw them finish bottom of their group with two wins from eight matches.

Glamorgan played 17 first class games in 2005, winning one, drawing two and losing 14. Their 18 List A matches gave seven wins, seven losses and four no-results, while eight Twenty20 matches ended with two wins, five losses and one no-result.

== Squad ==
- No. denotes the player's squad number, as worn on the back of their shirt.
- ‡ denotes players with international caps.
- * denotes a player who has been awarded a county cap.
- Ages given as of the first day of the County Championship season, 13 April 2005.

No.	Name	Nationality	Birth date	Batting style	Bowling style	Notes
Batsmen
	Dan Cherry	Wales	7 February 1980 (aged 25)	Left-handed	Right arm medium	
	Matthew Elliott ‡	Australia	28 September 1971 (aged 33)	Left-handed	Left arm medium	
	Sourav Ganguly ‡	India	8 July 1972 (aged 32)	Left-handed	Right arm medium	
	Richard Grant	Wales	5 June 1984 (aged 20)	Right-handed	Right arm medium	
	David Hemp	Bermuda	8 November 1970 (aged 34)	Left-handed	Right arm medium	
	Jonathan Hughes	Wales	30 June 1981 (aged 23)	Right-handed	Right arm medium	
	Matthew Maynard ‡	England	21 March 1966 (aged 39)	Right-handed	Right arm medium	
	Mike O'Shea	Wales	4 September 1987 (aged 17)	Right-handed	Right arm medium-fast	
	Mike Powell	Wales	3 February 1977 (aged 28)	Right-handed	Right arm off break	
	Gareth Rees	Wales	8 April 1985 (aged 19)	Left-handed	Left arm medium	
	Ian Thomas	Wales	9 May 1979 (aged 25)	Left-handed	Right arm off break	
	Ben Wright	England	5 December 1987 (aged 17)	Right-handed	Right arm medium-fast	
All-rounders
	Robert Croft ‡	Wales	25 May 1970 (aged 34)	Right-handed	Right arm off break	Club captain
	Adrian Dale	Wales	24 October 1968 (aged 36)	Right-handed	Right arm medium	
	Ryan Watkins	Wales	9 June 1983 (aged 21)	Left-handed	Right arm medium	
Wicket-keepers
	Adrian Shaw	Wales	17 February 1972 (aged 33)	Right-handed	—	
	Mark Wallace	Wales	19 November 1981 (aged 23)	Left-handed	—	
Bowlers
	Dean Cosker	England	7 January 1978 (aged 27)	Right-handed	Slow left arm orthodox	
	Andrew Davies	Wales	7 November 1976 (aged 28)	Left-handed	Right arm medium	
	Adam Harrison	Wales	30 October 1985 (aged 19)	Right-handed	Right arm medium	
	David Harrison	Wales	30 July 1981 (aged 23)	Right-handed	Right arm fast-medium	
19	Simon Jones ‡	Wales	25 December 1978 (aged 26)	Left-handed	Right arm fast	
	Michael Kasprowicz ‡	Australia	10 February 1972 (aged 33)	Right-handed	Right arm fast	
	Darren Thomas	Wales	25 January 1975 (aged 30)	Left-handed	Right arm fast-medium	
	Alex Wharf ‡	England	4 June 1975 (aged 29)	Right-handed	Right arm fast-medium	

== County Championship ==
=== Standings ===
2005 County Championship – Division One
Pos	Team	Pld	W	D	L	Pen	BP	Pts
1	Nottinghamshire (C)	16	9	4	3	0	94	236
2	Hampshire	16	9	4	3	0.5	92	233.5
3	Sussex	16	7	6	3	0	102	224
4	Warwickshire	16	8	3	5	0.5	86	209.5
5	Kent	16	6	7	3	8.5	99	202.5
6	Middlesex	16	4	7	5	0.5	98	181.5
7	Surrey (R)	16	4	9	3	8.5	97	180.5
8	Gloucestershire (R)	16	1	5	10	2	72	104
9	Glamorgan (R)	16	1	1	14	0	71	88.5

=== Matches ===
==== Warwickshire v Glamorgan (13–16 April) ====
13–16 April 2005
Scorecard

Glamorgan	v	Warwickshire
198 (63.3 overs); Matthew Elliott 84 (145); Ashley Giles 6/44 (17.3 overs)		564/8d (151.4 overs); Mike Powell 146 (278); Simon Jones 3/121 (29 overs)
323 (82 overs); David Hemp 96 (112); Ian Bell 3/64 (15 overs)

Warwickshire won by an innings and 43 runs
Edgbaston Cricket Ground, Birmingham
Umpires: Peter Hartley and Vanburn Holder

- Glamorgan won the toss and elected to bat.
- Points: Warwickshire 22, Glamorgan 1.

Glamorgan won the toss at a cold Edgbaston and chose to bat. The pitch had been roughed up to encourage turn for the benefit of Ashley Giles. The England selectors would have been pleased that he made the most of it, taking 6/44, the third-best figures of his first-class career to date. Earlier in that innings, however, Matthew Elliott, Glamorgan's Australian batsman scored 84 to take his team to a comfortable looking 157/3. However, Glamorgan then lost their final seven wickets for 41 runs. Warwickshire held five catches to restrict their opposition to 198, two short of their first bonus point. Nick Knight and Mark Wagh then saw Warwickshire through to 68 for no loss, before bad light stopped play.

After losing Knight and Wagh with only 4 added to the overnight score, the title holders showed their class. After the start of the day, the pitch calmed down, and England hopeful Ian Bell, who scored 96, and Mike Powell put on 153 for the fourth wicket. Dougie Brown then helped himself to a half-century being unbeaten on 85 at close, with Powell on 144 not out and Warwickshire on 415/4, 217 ahead. Alex Wharf and Simon Jones bowled enthusiastically, but without much to show for it.

On a cold third day, runs came at around five an over, though this was aided by the short boundaries. This allowed 362 runs to be scored, even though almost all the third session was lost to bad light. In the first session of the third day, Warwickshire's runs flowed freely. Although Powell only added 2, Brown moved on to 122, and Heath Streak had time to score 41 not out before Warwickshire declared on 564/8, 366 ahead. Elliott and David Hemp put on 162 for the second wicket. However, Matthew Maynard went for a duck, leaving Glamorgan on 213/4 at close.

On the fourth day, Robert Croft and Darren Thomas held Warwickshire briefly at bay with a partnership of 75, but this was not enough as Glamorgan succumbed for 323. Warwickshire captain, Nick Knight, said, "Once they were bowled out for 198 on that pitch they were always going to struggle. They then put down three catches, which proved to be decisive. We had a bit of luck so we are not going to start going around saying that we are going to win the Championship just because we have won one match." John Derrick, Glamorgan's coach, said, "Although we batted much better second time around, we made it difficult for ourselves by not scoring enough first innings runs. Warwickshire showed what playing pressure cricket is all about. They bowled with a lot of discipline. They piled up a big score to make sure that we didn't get back into the game."

==== Glamorgan v Surrey (27–30 April) ====
27–30 April 2005
Scorecard

Glamorgan	v	Surrey
250 (64.1 overs); Mark Wallace 96 (127); Mohammad Akram 4/67 (16.3 overs)		248 (74.4 overs); Mark Ramprakash 107 (186); Alex Wharf 3/52 (19 overs)
173 (46.4 overs); Mark Wallace 55 (103); Jimmy Ormond 7/63 (18.4 overs)		178/5 (36 overs); Mark Ramprakash 68* (103); Robert Croft 2/41 (11 overs)

Surrey won by 5 wickets
Sophia Gardens, Cardiff
Umpires: Graham Burgess and John Steele

- Glamorgan won the toss and elected to bat first.
- Points: Surrey 18, Glamorgan 5.

Glamorgan batted first at Cardiff, coming out finally at 2:30 p.m. as rain delayed the start. Matthew Elliott was then dismissed first ball. However, Mark Wallace performed better, adding 86 from 107 balls to still be there at the close of play. Surrey probably had the best of the day, which ended with the Dragons on 238/9. However, it could have been a lot worse for Glamorgan, as David Hemp was dropped three times. Mohammad Akram got good rewards for his bowling, taking four wickets.

Glamorgan picked up 12 more runs on day two to finish on 250. Then, on another rain affected day, Mark Ramprakash, Surrey's stand-in captain, became the second active player to pass 25,000 first-class runs. He finished the day on 72 not out. The second day ended with Surrey on 162/4.

Ramprakash completed his century on the third day, but only Rikki Clarke (35) could add more than 20 runs, and Surrey were bowled out for 248. Surrey had a two-run deficit to catch up with, but they did it, mainly thanks to James Ormond. Ormond swung his way to 7/63, helping Surrey on their way to victory. Ormond reduced Glamorgan to 15/2 by lunch and 87/7 in the 19th over. Glamorgan's last three partnerships added 86, but the target was still lower than Surrey's first-innings score, with 176. Surrey hit at nearly five runs an over as they approached their target and were 122/4 off 26 overs at close, Ramprakash on 49.

Surrey took under 35 minutes to wrap up victory, and they only lost one wicket in the 10 overs it took. Ramprakash again was the mainstay of the innings and was not out for 68 when the winning runs came.

==== Glamorgan v Gloucestershire (6–9 May) ====
6–9 May 2005
Scorecard

Gloucestershire	v	Glamorgan
466 (123.1 overs); Chris Taylor 176 (185); Alex Wharf 3/127 (30.1 overs)		239 (66 overs); Mark Wallace 52 (56); Alex Gidman 4/47 (10 overs)
119/3 (44.3 overs); Tim Hancock 41* (65); Dean Cosker 2/43 (17 overs)		345 (f/o; 107.1 overs); Matthew Elliott 123 (253); Upul Chandana 5/117 (36.1 overs)

Gloucestershire won by 7 wickets
Sophia Gardens, Cardiff
Umpires: John Hampshire and Nigel Cowley

- Gloucestershire won the toss and elected to bat.
- Points: Gloucestershire 22, Glamorgan 4.

Gloucestershire batted first at Cardiff and made runs at a rate of nearly four an over on their way to their only win of the 2005 season. With the top four all making more than 25 runs and the three first partnerships all accounting for more than fifty runs, Chris Taylor hit his way to 176 off 185 balls with four sixes, hitting 76 runs with the last 43 balls he faced. By the close of play, Gloucestershire were 439/8, with Upul Chandana just dismissed by Robert Croft. England ODI bowler Alex Wharf did the brunt of the bowling effort with 30.1 overs, getting Taylor out eventually, and finishing with 3/127 as Gloucestershire were bowled out for 466 early on the second day.

Matthew Elliott and Ian Thomas started the reply well for the hosts Glamorgan, putting on 40 for the first wicket before Thomas departed, but the Gloucestershire seamers Jon Lewis and Alex Gidman shared out wickets to reduce Glamorgan to 48/4. Double-digit contributions from the lower order, led by wicket-keeper Mark Wallace, who made a half-century, lifted Glamorgan to a total of 239 – still 237 behind Wallace. Following on, Glamorgan batted for nearly 25 overs before losing their first wicket – Ian Thomas – and stumps were drawn when that happened, leaving Glamorgan on 93/1.

The third day, however, was the day of the spinners. After Matt Elliott (123), David Hemp (57) and Mike Powell (39) took Glamorgan to 274/2 and a lead of 47, Sri Lankan leg-spinner Chandana and all-rounder Ian Fisher shared the last eight wickets between them for 71 runs, Chandana finishing with 5/117 and Fisher with 4/89, and resulting in a target of 119 for Gloucestershire to win. Glamorgan's spinners also took wickets, Dean Cosker and Robert Croft grabbing three as Gloucestershire to 59/3 at close on day 3, but on the morning of day 4, Gloucestershire batsman Tim Hancock – in his 15th season with the team – guided the visitors to the target with an unbeaten 41.

==== Surrey v Glamorgan (11–14 May) ====
11–14 May 2005
Scorecard

Surrey	v	Glamorgan
444 (108.4 overs); Ali Brown 122 (116); David Harrison 3/72 (20 overs)		345 (74.5 overs); David Harrison 75* (73); Martin Bicknell 6/74 (19.5 overs)
425/4d (91.3 overs); Scott Newman 219 (248); Andrew Davies 2/76 (15 overs)		248 (55.1 overs); David Hemp 95 (139); Mohammad Akram 4/63 (12.1 overs)

Surrey won by 276 runs
The Oval, London
Umpires: Pasty Harris and Trevor Jesty

- Surrey won the toss and elected to bat.
- Points: Surrey, 22, Glamorgan 6.

Glamorgan went down to their fourth successive defeat, this time to Surrey, who had been defeated by Nottinghamshire in their previous game. At The Oval, there was a short boundary towards Harleyford Road, over which Scott Newman (117) and Ali Brown (122) hit plenty of runs to take Surrey to 441/7 on the first day. They lost their final three wickets on the second day for three more runs. However, 444 was enough to get a first-innings lead, as Glamorgan were dismissed for 345 with Martin Bicknell taking 6/74. The last three Glamorgan partnerships added 154 runs, with No. 9 David Harrison top-scoring with 75 not out. Surrey were in to bat again before the second day ended, and were 66 for no loss at stumps, with 855 runs hit in two days.

On the third day, Newman (219) became the first man to make both a century and a double century in a game for Surrey as they finally declared on 425/4, leaving a theoretical target of 525. Bicknell then took his 1,000th wicket for Surrey as Glamorgan batted to 177/2 at close, with David Hemp and Mike Powell on 77 and 80 not out respectively. However, one session was enough to finish off Glamorgan, with Rikki Clarke and Mohammad Akram getting reverse swing to take 3 and 4 wickets respectively, as Glamorgan were reduced to 248 all out. Their last seven wickets fell for 28 runs.

==== Hampshire v Glamorgan (20–23 May) ====
20–23 May 2005
Scorecard

Hampshire	v	Glamorgan
401/8d (116 overs); Kevin Pietersen 126 (116); Simon Jones 3/73 (34 overs)		229 (68.2 overs); Darren Thomas 63 (69); Chris Tremlett 4/42 (13 overs)
80/1 (14.4 overs); Michael Brown 28* (42)		250 (f/o; 84.4 overs); Mike Powell; Sean Ervine 5/60 (23.4 overs)

Hampshire won by 9 wickets
Rose Bowl, Southampton
Umpires: Allan Jones and Nigel Llong

- Hampshire won the toss and elected to bat.
- Points: Hampshire 22, Glamorgan 3.

Amid showers at Southampton, Hampshire batted their way to the big lead they were expected to get against Glamorgan, who had lost four games in the Championship before this. Former England batsman John Crawley took a day for his century, while in contrast Kevin Pietersen took two-and-a-half hours for his, making a century off 99 balls and ending with 126. Hampshire eventually made 401/8 declared to get full batting points before attacking Glamorgan. Chris Tremlett reaped Glamorgan wickets in the next innings, removing David Hemp, Mike Powell and Jonathan Hughes among others to take 4/42 and reduce Glamorgan to 229 – a score that would have been much lower but for Darren Thomas, who blitzed his way to 63. Following on, Glamorgan got to 77/1 at stumps on day three, but wickets tumbled in the morning, reducing Glamorgan to 147/5. Robert Croft and Mike Powell rebuilt, but when Australian batsman Simon Katich had Croft caught by skipper Shane Warne and Powell went a few overs later, Glamorgan ended on a total of 250 as Zimbabwe all-rounder Sean Ervine picked up the last three wickets, finishing with 5/60, while Tremlett took 3/48. In reply, Hampshire reached the target of 79 inside 15 overs, with Katich – unusually – opening the batting. With Nottinghamshire losing to Kent and Warwickshire and Surrey not playing, Hampshire took the lead in the Championship with their emphatic full-score win.

==== Glamorgan v Sussex (1–4 June) ====
1–4 June 2005
Scorecard

Sussex	v	Glamorgan
497/5d (124 overs); Richard Montgomerie 184* (346); Robert Croft 2/100 (25 overs)		301 (61 overs); David Hemp 128 (132); Jason Lewry 6/77 (21 overs)
		354/3 (f/o; 80 overs); Matthew Elliott 162 (171); Michael Yardy 2/62 (16 overs)

Match drawn
St Helen's, Swansea
Umpires: Graham Burgess and Neil Mallender

- Glamorgan won the toss and elected to field.
- Points: Sussex 12, Glamorgan 8.

Although Glamorgan followed on at Swansea, they still managed a draw after the first day was rained off. On the second day, which was also shortened, Sussex scored 225/2 after Glamorgan won the toss and put them in. Two Sussex batsmen reached their highest scores of 2005 on the third morning, as Richard Montgomerie ended with 184 not out – 12 off his career best – and Murray Goodwin reached 158. Sussex finally declared on 497/5, and in reply Matthew Elliott made 85 and David Hemp 128 and Glamorgan reached 301, which was not enough to avoid the follow-on. The experienced fast bowler Jason Lewry took 6/77 for Sussex, while the Welsh team's new import, Indian captain Sourav Ganguly, scored a duck in his first innings. However, Glamorgan achieved a draw as Matthew Elliott made 162 and they survived for 80 overs. When time was called, Glamorgan were on 354/3.

==== Glamorgan v Kent (8–10 June) ====
8–10 June 2005
Scorecard

Kent	v	Glamorgan
568 (158.3 overs); Martin van Jaarsveld 262* (439); Robert Croft 3/161 (46 overs)		358 (98.4 overs); Sourav Ganguly 69 (96); James Tredwell 2/37 (14 overs)
51/0 (7.5 overs); David Fulton 25* (26)		260 (45.4 overs); Sourav Ganguly 142 (125); Andrew Hall 4/38 (10 overs)

Kent won by 10 wickets
Sophia Gardens, Cardiff
Umpires: Alan Whitehead and Jeremy Lloyds

- Kent won the toss and elected to bat.
- Points: Kent 21.5, Glamorgan 6.

Glamorgan went down to their fifth defeat of the season at Sophia Gardens in Cardiff. After winning the toss and losing two wickets for 16 runs, Kent's next eight wickets added over 30 times that as Kent ended with a total of 568, thanks mainly to 262 not out from Martin van Jaarsveld – the highest score of the English county season thus far – with Darren Stevens (80) and Min Patel (87) sharing partnerships of more than 125 runs with Van Jaarsveld. Glamorgan had nine double-figure scores in reply, but unlike Kent they had no one to go past 70, and they were bowled out for 358 after six Kent bowlers had taken at least one wicket. The follow-on was enforced, and now Glamorgan had to be content with seven single-figure scores after Amjad Khan and Andrew Hall took care of their top order. Khan ripped out three early wickets – for which Glamorgan managed five runs, and Martin Saggers and Andrew Hall was responsible for the next two wicket, leaving the Welsh team at 34/5. Their overseas player, Sourav Ganguly, who played in his second match this season, added 55% of the Glamorgan team score, making 142 in three hours before he was last out, caught by Van Jaarsveld for 142. Kent were set a target of 51 in their second innings, which they achieved without loss of a wicket to win inside three days. Kent were deducted half a point for a slow over rate.

==== Middlesex v Glamorgan (15–18 June) ====
15–18 June 2005
Scorecard

Glamorgan	v	Middlesex
584/3d (133 overs); Dan Cherry 226 (349); Melvyn Betts 1/80 (20 overs)		435/4d (95.3 overs); Ed Joyce 155* (188); Dean Cosker 2/133 (34 overs)
256/3d (52 overs); Jonathan Hughes 100* (121); Alan Richardson 3/24 (8 overs)		408/4 (77.5 overs); Owais Shah 155 (202); Robert Croft 2/141 (25 overs)

Middlesex won by 6 wickets
John Walker's Ground, Southgate
Umpires: Peter Willey and Tim Robinson

- Glamorgan won the toss and elected to bat.
- Points: Middlesex 20, Glamorgan 6.

Middlesex won the match at Southgate, where only 14 wickets fell in four days, while seven centuries were hit, including a double-century. After the first day was shortened by rain, Glamorgan got into their stride on the second day, Dan Cherry taking seven hours to make 226 runs – while Middlesex' best bowling figures came from Melvyn Betts, taking 1/80. Glamorgan declared on 584/3, and Middlesex replied in fashion, declaring on 435/4 in an attempt to get a result – Ed Joyce scoring 155. Three quick wickets from Alan Richardson gave Middlesex some hope of forcing Glamorgan out, but a 118-ball 84 not out from Sourav Ganguly and Jonathan Hughes' second century of the match resulted in Glamorgan setting a target of 408 in 82 overs – a rate similar to that required in one-day cricket. However, more centuries awaited, as Ed Smith and Owais Shah took Middlesex to 380/1 (admittedly with Ben Hutton retired hurt), and Irishman Joyce made 70 not out to see Middlesex to the target.

==== Nottinghamshire v Glamorgan (8–11 July) ====
8–10 July 2005
Scorecard

Glamorgan	v	Nottinghamshire
267 (61 overs); Sourav Ganguly 47 (77); Greg Smith 4/64 (17 overs)		425 (110 overs); Chris Read 103* (118); Huw Waters 4/75 (23 overs)
214 (78.3 overs); Richard Grant 33 (77); Mark Footitt 4/45 (14.3 overs)		57/0 (17.4 overs); Jason Gallian 31* (49)

Nottinghamshire won by 10 wickets
Trent Bridge, Nottingham
Umpires: John Hampshire and Nigel Cowley

- Nottinghamshire won the toss and elected to field.
- Huw Waters (Glam) and Mark Footitt (Notts) made their first-class debuts.
- Points: Nottinghamshire 22, Glamorgan 5.

Glamorgan remained on the bottom of the Championship table after their eighth loss in nine County Championship games, this time to Nottinghamshire at Trent Bridge. The hosts won the toss and sent Glamorgan in to bat, and got wickets, admittedly while conceding runs at a rate of more than four an over in the process – the final score was 261 in 61 overs. Chris Read, the former England wicket-keeper, then made his fifth first-class century with a 117-ball ton, only to be departed by Nottinghamshire's last man Mark Footitt shortly afterwards – left stranded on 103 not out. Nottinghamshire, however, had made it to a total of 425, and Footitt made amends with the ball, taking 4/45 amid no-balls and wides. Glamorgan were taken out for 214 midway through the third day, as nine batsmen made it into double figures but none could go beyond 35, and Nottinghamshire openers Darren Bicknell and Jason Gallian went past the target of 57 in 17.4 overs as Nottinghamshire recorded a full-score win.

==== Glamorgan v Middlesex (21–23 July) ====
21–23 July 2005
Scorecard

Middlesex	v	Glamorgan
534 (123.3 overs); Jamie Dalrymple 108 (143); David Harrison 5/117 (23.3 overs)		232 (56.3 overs); Robert Croft 84 (76); Scott Styris 3/42 (11 overs)
		279 (f/o; 88 overs); Mark Wallace 64 (105); Scott Styris 5/57 (17 overs)

Middlesex won by an innings and 23 runs
Sophia Gardens, Cardiff
Umpires: John Holder and Roy Palmer

- Middlesex won the toss and elected to bat.
- Points: Middlesex 22, Glamorgan 4.

The sixth-placed Middlesex inflicted the ninth defeat of the season on Glamorgan at Sophia Gardens, and their second of three innings defeats. After winning the toss, Ed Smith dominated proceedings in the first hour, making 29 in an opening stand of 40 before he was bowled by Huw Waters, Ben Hutton and Owais Shah made a partnership of 109 to lift Middlesex, and their batting line-up from one to nine all made it past 25 as the score finished on 534 – Shah finishing on 101, his third of seven Championship centuries, Kenyan-born Jamie Dalrymple scoring a season-high 108, and number nine Peter Trego smacking 72 off 54 balls – also a season-best. When Glamorgan batted, Trego took three wickets in the first two hours, to end with 3/52, and Scott Styris helped to dismiss the Glamorgan tail, removing numbers six, eight and nine to take 3/42. Only Robert Croft passed 25 – making 84 off 76 balls with 72 runs in boundaries – as Glamorgan were bowled out for 232 in a session and a half and were asked to follow on.

Middlesex seamer Melvyn Betts set back Glamorgan's second innings effort with two wickets to see them to 25/2, but opener and wicket-keeper Mark Wallace top-scored with 64, and Sourav Ganguly also made 55 as Glamorgan made their way to 208/5, still needing 96 to make Middlesex bat again. However, Styris took the last four wickets en route to bowling figures of 5/57, his second five-for of the season, as Middlesex secured the innings victory.

==== Kent v Glamorgan (3–5 August) ====
3–5 August 2005
Scorecard

Kent	v	Glamorgan
587 (135.5 overs); Darren Stevens 208 (285); Dean Cosker 3/123 (30 overs)		306 (95.5 overs); David Hemp 171* (231); Simon Cook 3/35 (13.5 overs)
		157 (52 overs); Jonathan Hughes 27 (84); Andrew Hall 4/32 (13 overs)

Kent won by an innings and 124 runs
St Lawrence Ground, Canterbury
Umpires: Neil Bainton and Nigel Llong

- Kent won the toss and elected to bat.
- Points: Kent 22, Glamorgan 5.

Kent, as expected, beat Glamorgan, but were worried on occasion. Having been shaken early on as Glamorgan dug out four early wickets, Kent were lifted by a 267-run partnership between Darren Stevens (who made 208) and Andrew Hall (133) which helped them along the way to a final first-innings score of 587, with Min Patel taking 55 balls for a 64 from number nine. Six Glamorgan players were then out in single figures, Amjad Khan taking 3/68, but number three David Hemp stood tall with an unbeaten 171. Glamorgan were 188/9 at one point on day two, but survived to stumps to 236/9, and just kept going – their number 11, Huw Waters, made 34 from 192 balls, and he added 118 with Hemp, for the second-highest stand of the match.

However, Hemp was worn out after his marathon knock, and was sent in at five as Glamorgan followed on. Glamorgan were bundled out for 157, Hemp only lasting half an hour before he was lbw to Hall, who took 4/32. Justin Kemp and Simon Cook also got two wickets each, while Jonathan Hughes top-scored with 27. This was Glamorgan's 10th loss in the County Championship this season.

==== Glamorgan v Warwickshire (10–12 August) ====
10–12 August 2005
Scorecard

Glamorgan	v	Warwickshire
239 (58.1 overs); Robert Croft 66* (92); Dougie Brown 4/58 (17 overs)		545/7d (126 overs); Jonathan Trott 152 (247); Robert Croft 3/126 (37 overs)
308 (88.1 overs); Mike Powell 72* (141); Neil Carter 3/73 (22 overs)		3/0 (2.2 overs); Nick Knight 2* (5)

Warwickshire won by 10 wickets
Penrhyn Avenue, Colwyn Bay
Umpires: Ian Gould and Richard Illingworth

- Glamorgan won the toss and elected to bat.
- Points: Warwickshire 22, Glamorgan 3.

Warwickshire took control of proceedings on the first day at Colwyn Bay, as they fielded a bowling attack with no English-born players against Glamorgan. South Africa international Makhaya Ntini was the least effective, only getting the wicket of number 11 Dean Cosker, and conceding 49 runs in the process. Meanwhile, Scot Dougie Brown took 4/58, but Glamorgan actually recovered quite well from 76/6 to their final score of 239. However, their blunt bowling attack were shown up again, as Ian Westwood recorded his maiden first-class century, four batsmen passed fifty, and Warwickshire muscled their way to 545/7 before declaring. Jonathan Trott also made 152 for Warwickshire, while Robert Croft was the most effective bowler – with 3/126.

Wicket-keeper Mark Wallace then smashed 68 not out off 50 balls to see Glamorgan to the end of the day at 99/1. However, he only faced two balls on the third morning before being lbw to Brown. Most of the Warwickshire bowlers got in among the wickets – part-time medium-pace bowler Trott taking 2/19 in four overs, for example – and Warwickshire were set three to win, which they achieved off 14 deliveries, culminating in Nick Knight hitting a single off David Harrison.

==== Gloucestershire v Glamorgan (25–28 August) ====
25–28 August 2005
Scorecard

Glamorgan	v	Gloucestershire
382 (114.2 overs); Dan Cherry 166 (348); Malinga Bandara 3/56 (27 overs)		133 (34 overs); Jon Lewis 36* (31); Alex Wharf 6/59 (17 overs)
290 (95 overs); Dean Cosker 52 (107); Malinga Bandara 4/85 (37 overs)		217 (68.3 overs); Alex Gidman 56 (108); Alex Wharf 5/62 (16 overs)

Glamorgan won by 322 runs
County Ground, Bristol
Umpires: Jeff Evans and Mervyn Kitchen

- Glamorgan won the toss and elected to bat.
- Points: Glamorgan 20.5, Gloucestershire 3.
- Glamorgan deducted 0.5 points due to a slow over rate.

Glamorgan recorded their first Championship win in 13 attempts this season at Bristol against fellow relegation candidates Gloucestershire. Dan Cherry made his second century of the season with changing partners, as he carried his bat to 152 not out at stumps – the total on 350/8. Cherry was last out, for 166, as Glamorgan were bowled out for 382 – to pass 350 for only the third time so far this season. Then, David Harrison and Alex Wharf embarked on a 19th-century-like bowling effort – in that they did almost all of the bowling. The seam pairing bowled 33 of the 34 overs, sharing all ten wickets. Gloucestershire crashed to 66/8 before Steve Adshead and Jon Lewis added 67 for the ninth wicket, but Wharf had Adshead caught and bowled before bowling William Rudge with the next ball. Robert Croft did not opt to bat again, however, preferring to set a big target for Gloucestershire to chase.

However, Gloucestershire bowled with more effect the second time around, Malinga Bandara taking 4/85 in a marathon 37-over spin bowling effort. Rudge repaired his golden duck, taking a wicket with his first ball of the innings to remove Mark Wallace for another golden duck. However, Rudge was taken for 36 in a six-over spell, and never returned to bowl. Dean Cosker top-scored for Glamorgan with 52 from number seven as they made their way to 290, setting Gloucestershire a target of 540 to win – which would have been a record run chase in first-class cricket. Ramnaresh Sarwan attempted it, hitting out well after Kadeer Ali had been dismissed, but he was eventually bowled by Huw Waters for 54. Gloucestershire succumbed to 184/5 at stumps, needing to survive another day for the draw. Wharf spoiled that, though, taking four wickets on the fourth morning as Gloucestershire crawled to 217 and a 322-run defeat.

==== Glamorgan v Nottinghamshire (30 August – 2 September) ====
30 August – 2 September 2005
Scorecard

Glamorgan	v	Nottinghamshire
151 (48 overs); Mike Powell 62 (104); Greg Smith 4/28 (17 overs)		283 (106.5 overs); Darren Bicknell 123 (229); Dean Cosker 4/57 (22.5 overs)
307 (90.4 overs); Alex Wharf 113 (172); Mark Ealham 4/50 (17 overs)		179/2 (53.1 overs); Jason Gallian 70 (127); Dean Cosker 1/48 (22 overs)

Nottinghamshire won by 8 wickets
Sophia Gardens, Cardiff
Umpires: David Constant and Roy Palmer

- Glamorgan won the toss and elected to bat.
- Points: Nottinghamshire 19, Glamorgan 3.

Glamorgan went down to another loss the week after recording their first Championship win, as it took Nottinghamshire's bowlers 48 overs to wrap up their first innings after Glamorgan won the toss and batted. Glamorgan's number five Mike Powell made 62 as the only Glamorgan batsman to pass 25, but left-armer Greg Smith got him and three others out to finish with 4/28 off 17 overs. Glamorgan's final total was 151, and Nottinghamshire matched that for the loss of only two wickets at the close of the first day, despite losing opener Jason Gallian for a duck. On the second, only 33 overs of play were possible, but Nottinghamshire still added 80 before Darren Bicknell was dismissed for 123. The last seven partnerships mustered 52 runs – a quarter of what the first three partnerships had managed, as Robert Croft took three wickets and Dean Cosker four either side of stumps on the second day.

Nottinghamshire had accumulated a 132-run lead on first innings, and their bowlers took five wickets before the sixth-wicket pair of Powell and Alex Wharf doubled the total and more, adding 118 in three hours, as Glamorgan gave Nottinghamshire something to chase. Four wickets from Mark Ealham in the late hours of the third day's play, though, reduced Glamorgan to 290/9 at the close, and Wharf added 17 on the fourth morning with Huw Waters (who recorded an unbeaten 24-ball duck) before he was dismissed by Andrew Harris for 113, his highest first-class score. Wharf's century meant that Nottinghamshire's winning target was 176, and fifties from Gallian and Russell Warren carried Nottinghamshire past the target and onto the top of the Championship table with eight wickets in hand.

==== Sussex v Glamorgan (7–8 September) ====
7–8 September 2005
Scorecard

Glamorgan	v	Sussex
255 (77.3 overs); David Hemp 71 (107); Mushtaq Ahmed 5/89 (25.3 overs)		317 (96.4 overs); Chris Adams 84 (143); Alex Wharf 3/75 (21 overs)
96 (28 overs); Dan Cherry 39 (84); Mushtaq Ahmed 5/29 (9 overs)		35/1 (6.4 overs); Richard Montgomerie 18* (19); Dean Cosker 1/7 (1 over)

Sussex won by 9 wickets
County Cricket Ground, Hove
Umpires: Peter Willey and Vanburn Holder

- Glamorgan won the toss and elected to bat.
- Points: Sussex 20, Glamorgan 5.

David Hemp made 71 as Glamorgan made their way to a relatively competitive total of 255 in 77.3 overs on the first day, while Mushtaq Ahmed took 5/89 and James Kirtley 4/42 in response. When Glamorgan bowled, Alex Wharf and Dean Cosker took a wicket each, as Sussex worked their way to 70/2. After a first day yielding 12 wickets, a further 19 went down on the second day, as Sussex took the victory to further extend the gap between the two sides. Sussex lost Ian Ward for 48 early on in the day, but fifties from Murray Goodwin and Chris Adams propelled them to a total of 317, a lead of 62. Naved-ul-Hasan then made up for his wicketless first innings effort by having two men caught behind and one bowled, as Glamorgan lost their first three wickets for 22, before Dan Cherry and Mike Powell forged a half-century partnership for Glamorgan. Once again, the Pakistanis broke through, with Rana and Mushtaq sharing five wickets, four of them ducks, and Glamorgan went from 73–4 to 78–9. Opener Cherry was last out, for 39, as Glamorgan were bowled out for 96 – Rana taking 5/41 and Mushtaq 5/29. Sussex were set a target of 35, which they passed for the loss of Ward to end with a nine-wicket victory.

==== Glamorgan v Hampshire (15–18 September) ====
15–18 September 2005
Scorecard

Hampshire	v	Glamorgan
350 (95.4 overs); Jimmy Adams 71 (148); Robert Croft 5/103 (25.4 overs)		249 (81 overs); David Hemp 51 (99); Shane Warne 4/50 (22 overs)
218/7d (32 overs); Sean Ervine 75 (73); Robert Croft 5/57 (10 overs)		244 (62.4 overs); Robert Croft 90 (151); Sean Ervine 5/60 (12.4 overs)

Hampshire won by 75 runs
Sophia Gardens, Cardiff
Umpires: Pasty Harris and Peter Hartley

- Hampshire won the toss and elected to bat.
- Points: Hampshire 21, Glamorgan 4.

The first day of this match was rained off, and so Glamorgan's last match of the season was effectively reduced to a three-day one. They still lost, however, rounding off their Championship season with their 14th loss in 16 matches to cement their last place in the table. When the match got underway, the entire Hampshire batting order from one to eight made their way past 15, and an innings including half-centuries from James Adams, Jono McLean, Simon Katich and Dimitri Mascarenhas, saw them to a total of 350. Australia leg spinner Shane Warne hit three sixes in a 17-minute 24, while Glamorgan captain Robert Croft snared five wickets, but was also the second most expensive bowler by economy rate of the six used, conceding 103 runs in 25.4 overs.

The returning Shane Warne, fresh from taking 40 wickets in the 2005 Ashes series, took 4/50 in Glamorgan's innings, as Glamorgan faltered from 151/4 to 249 all out, and the third day's play ended with Simon Katich and Sean Ervine plundering runs in return. An opening stand of 117 was achieved quickly, and Warne then hit two sixes in a nine-ball 15, as Hampshire added 218/7 in 32 overs before declaring. Croft completed another five-wicket-haul, but still conceded 57 in 10 overs (admittedly with an economy rate lower than the other bowlers). Set 320 to win, Glamorgan attempted the chase, hitting 44 in the first 40 minutes, and Croft led from the front with a well-paced 90. Once he was caught behind off Ervine, however, Glamorgan needed 94 for the last three wickets, and the lower order succumbed to the Zimbabwean Ervine. Wicket-keeper and number eight Mark Wallace was left not out on 33, as Glamorgan posted a total of 244, while Ervine finished with 5/60 in the second innings, his best bowling figures of the season thus far.

== totesport League ==
=== Standings ===
2005 totesport League – Division One
Pos	Team	Pld	W	L	NR	Pts
1	Essex Eagles	16	13	1	2	56
2	Middlesex Crusaders	16	10	5	1	42
3	Northamptonshire Steelbacks	16	7	7	2	32
4	Glamorgan Dragons	16	6	6	4	32
5	Nottinghamshire Outlaws	16	6	7	3	30
6	Lancashire Lightning	16	6	9	1	26
7	Gloucestershire Gladiators	16	6	9	1	26
8	Worcestershire Royals	16	5	10	1	22
9	Hampshire Hawks	16	5	10	1	22

=== Matches ===
==== Lancashire v Glamorgan (17 April) ====
17 April 2005
Scorecard

Lancashire Lightning; 160/8 (41.2 overs)	v	Glamorgan Dragons
Kyle Hogg 41* (75); Simon Jones 3/19 (7.2 overs)

No result
Old Trafford, Manchester
Umpires: Allan Jones and Neil Mallender

- Glamorgan won the toss and elected to field.
- Rain reduced the Lancashire innings to 41.2 overs and prevented any play in the Glamorgan innings.
- Andrew Crook (Lancs) made his List A debut.
- Points: Lancashire 2, Glamorgan 2.

Simon Jones took three wickets for 19 runs for the defending champion Glamorgan Dragons when they took on Lancashire Lightning at Old Trafford. Afterwards he said, "The older I've got the easier I've found bowling. My control has got better over the last couple of years and that showed today." Alex Wharf and Robert Croft chipped in as well, both taking two wickets as Lancashire moved to 160/8 off 41.2 overs, with Hogg top-scoring with 41 not out. Rain then brought proceedings to a close and the game was abandoned.

==== Glamorgan v Essex (22 April) ====
22 April 2005 (D/N)
Scorecard

Glamorgan	v	Essex

Match abandoned without a ball bowled
Sophia Gardens, Cardiff
Umpires: Graham Burgess and Jeremy Lloyds

- No toss.
- Rain prevented any play.
- Points: Glamorgan 2, Essex 2.

This match, which was scheduled to be played at Sophia Gardens in Cardiff, was abandoned without a ball being bowled. It was the first time for almost eight years a one-day league match at Cardiff had ended as a no-result.

==== Nottinghamshire v Glamorgan (2 May) ====
2 May 2005
Scorecard

Glamorgan Dragons; 204/4 (38 overs)	v	Nottinghamshire Outlaws; 217/8 (38 overs)
Robert Croft 42 (63); Gareth Clough 1/37 (3 overs)		David Hussey 68 (65); David Harrison 3/25 (8 overs)

Glamorgan won by 4 runs (D/L method)
Trent Bridge, Nottingham
Umpires: Barry Dudleston and Jeff Evans
Player of the match: David Hemp (Glam)

- Glamorgan won the toss and elected to bat.
- Rain reduced the match to 38 overs a side.
- Points: Glamorgan Dragons 4, Nottinghamshire Outlaws 0.

Glamorgan recorded their first win of the season at Trent Bridge after they had begun their League campaign with two no results. In an innings that turned out to be restricted to 38 overs, they scored 204/4, which by the Duckworth–Lewis method was converted into a target of 222 for the Nottinghamshire Outlaws. The Outlaws were 52/4 in reply before a partnership of 99 between David Hussey (68) and Chris Read (47) lifted them – however, they were both dismissed by Dean Cosker as Nottinghamshire lost four wickets for 28 to stand at 179/8. Samit Patel came in at nine and hit two sixes in his 40, as Nottinghamshire passed the Glamorgan first-innings total, but due to Glamorgan's innings being interrupted before they knew how many overs they would face, the Duckworth-Lewis calculations stated that Nottinghamshire were four runs behind their par score.

==== Essex v Glamorgan (15 May) ====
15 May 2005
Scorecard

Glamorgan; 216/7 (45 overs)	v	Essex; 217/5 (42.2 overs)
David Hemp 62* (88); Dale Steyn 3/34 (7 overs)		Ravi Bopara 96* (113); Andrew Davies 2/37 (8.2 overs)

Essex won by 5 wickets
County Cricket Ground, Chelmsford
Umpires: Peter Willey and Trevor Jesty

- Essex won the toss and elected to field.
- Points: Essex 4, Glamorgan 0.

Essex Eagles continued their unbeaten run in all cricket this season after getting the 185 runs they needed for the last six wickets against Glamorgan Dragons at Chelmsford. Essex won the toss and chose to field first, and Glamorgan made 216/7. James Middlebrook was the main contributor with the ball, taking 2/27 off nine overs, but South African pace bowler Dale Steyn also contributed with 3/34 amid no-balls and wides. Andrew Davies and David Harrison then reduced Essex to 31/4 before Ravi Bopara (96 not out) and, once again, Middlebrook (46) took centre stage. With a partnership of 122, the two cut nearly two-thirds off the target, and wicket-keeper James Foster contributed with 38 off 30 balls to see Essex to the target with five wickets and 16 balls to spare.

==== Glamorgan v Worcestershire (27 May) ====
27 May 2005
Scorecard

Glamorgan; 227 (45 overs)	v	Worcestershire; 174 (40.4 overs)
David Hemp 65* (75); Ray Price 2/29 (8 overs)		Zander de Bruyn 51 (82); David Harrison 5/33 (8.4 overs)

Glamorgan won by 53 runs
Sophia Gardens, Cardiff
Umpires: David Constant and Mark Benson

- Glamorgan won the toss and elected to bat.
- Points: Glamorgan 4, Worcestershire 0.

David Hemp gave Glamorgan Dragons a much-needed win in the National League against Worcestershire Royals, to break a streak of five successive cricket matches without a win, as his 65 lifted the team to what turned out to be an unreachable 227 – despite three run outs. When Glamorgan bowled everyone got wickets, and Worcestershire's best batsman of the innings, Zander de Bruyn with 51 runs, was eventually frustrated enough to get run out. Former England under-19 player David Harrison notched up the second five-wicket haul of his List A career, taking 5/33.

==== Glamorgan v Nottinghamshire (5 June) ====
5 June 2005
Scorecard

Glamorgan	v	Nottinghamshire

Match abandoned without a ball bowled
St Helen's, Swansea
Umpires: Graham Burgess and Neil Mallender

- No toss.
- Rain prevented any play.
- Points: Glamorgan 2, Nottinghamshire 2.

This match, which was due to be played at Swansea, was abandoned without a ball being bowled because of rain.

==== Hampshire v Glamorgan (19 June) ====
19 June 2005
Scorecard

Glamorgan; 211/7 (45 overs)	v	Hampshire; 212/3 (37.2 overs)
Robert Croft 88 (113); Shaun Udal 3/31 (9 overs)		Nic Pothas 76 (80); Dean Cosker 2/41 (9 overs)

Hampshire won by 7 wickets
Rose Bowl, Southampton
Umpires: Alan Whitehead and Nigel Cowley

- Glamorgan won the toss and elected to bat.
- Points: Hampshire 4, Glamorgan 0.

Glamorgan Dragons only took three wickets, which was not enough to defend a total of 211 against Hampshire Hawks at the Rose Bowl. Batting first, Glamorgan made it to 117/1 before spinners Shaun Udal and Shane Warne chipped away at the Glamorgan middle-order with five wickets together. Robert Croft, the former England spinner, top-scored with 88 from the opening position, while an eighth-wicket partnership of 23 between Mark Wallace and David Harrison took Glamorgan to a total of 211/7. It was never enough, however, as all Hampshire batsmen – excluding Derek Kenway, who was out for 4 – fired to score more than 30 runs. With 45 deliveries and seven wickets remaining, Hampshire passed the victory target to increase the gap to the relegation zone.

==== Worcestershire v Glamorgan (17 July) ====
17 July 2005
Scorecard

Worcestershire; 273/3 (45 overs)	v	Glamorgan; 274/5 (44 overs)
Stephen Moore 104 (123); Sourav Ganguly 1/19 (5 overs)		Mike Powell 82 (90); David Leatherdale 2/35 (7 overs)

Glamorgan won by 5 wickets
New Road, Worcester
Umpires: George Sharp and Peter Willey

- Worcestershire won the toss and elected to bat.
- Points: Glamorgan 4, Worcestershire 0.

Worcestershire Royals failed to defend a total of 273/3 – their highest of the season thus far – against Glamorgan Dragons at New Road. Winning the toss and batting first, Worcestershire captain Vikram Solanki paired up for 91 with Stephen Moore, who would go on to make 104. Zander de Bruyn also made an unbeaten fifty to lift Worcestershire to 273/3. The Indian international Sourav Ganguly was the only Glamorgan bowler to escape with less than five runs an over to his name, as he got one wicket for 19 in his five overs. Worcestershire dismissed Robert Croft in the second over, but Glamorgan sent out another pinch-hitter in Alex Wharf who made 38 before he was bowled by David Leatherdale, who took 2/35. Another wicket fell shortly afterwards, and Glamorgan were 67/3, but Ganguly made 53, Mike Powell contributed 82, and David Hemp sealed the win with his unbeaten 51 off 36 ball. The Glamorgan batsmen took a particular liking to England Test spinner Gareth Batty, who finished wicketless for 69 runs.

==== Glamorgan v Middlesex (20 July) ====
20 July 2005 (D/N)
Scorecard

Middlesex; 284/9 (45 overs)	v	Glamorgan; 173 (35.4 overs)
Paul Weekes 72 (97); Robert Croft 3/54 (9 overs)		Alex Wharf 42 (48); Chris Peploe 4/38 (9 overs)

Middlesex won by 111 runs
Sophia Gardens, Cardiff
Umpires: Roy Palmer and Vanburn Holder
Player of the match: Ben Hutton (Middx)

- Middlesex won the toss and elected to bat.
- Points: Middlesex 4, Glamorgan 0.

After Paul Weekes had taken Middlesex Crusaders to 149/5 after his 72, the young batsmen showed an appetite for runs as Glamorgan Dragons sunk to a defeat in this match between number two and three in the one-day tables. Both Ed Joyce and Ben Hutton made 61 at rates well-over a run a ball, and added 110 for the sixth wicket, before number 11 Alan Richardson finished off with a last-ball six off Robert Croft to bring the total to 284/9 after Croft had grabbed three late wickets. Chris Peploe then took 4/38, pinch hitters Croft and Alex Wharf were run out, Owais Shah held four catches despite not being the wicket-keeper, and Glamorgan were bowled out for 173 in 35.4 overs, leaving them losers by 111 runs, their heaviest defeat by runs in one-day cricket all season.

==== Glamorgan v Lancashire (14 August) ====
14 August 2005
Scorecard

Glamorgan; 173 (40.5 overs)	v	Lancashire; 176/2 (31.2 overs)
Alex Wharf 36 (42); Dominic Cork 4/37 (7.5 overs)		Mal Loye 79* (95); Alex Wharf 1/30 (5 overs)

Lancashire won by 8 wickets
Penrhyn Avenue, Colwyn Bay
Umpires: Ian Gould and Richard Illingworth

- Lancashire won the toss and elected to field.
- Points: Lancashire 4, Glamorgan 0.

Lancashire Lightning recorded a relatively easy victory at Colwyn Bay, beating Glamorgan Dragons by eight wickets. Dominic Cork took 4/37 as the Dragons crashed to 173 all out, Alex Wharf – who had been promoted to three as pinch-hitter – top scoring with 36. Mal Loye then carried Lancashire past the target with 79 not out, while Stuart Law, Marcus North and Andrew Symonds all passed 25.

==== Northamptonshire v Glamorgan (17 August) ====
17 August 2005 (D/N)
Scorecard

Northamptonshire; 201 (43.2 overs)	v	Glamorgan; 203/5 (41.4 overs)
Riki Wessels 80 (72); David Harrison 2/17 (9 overs)		Robert Croft 81* (111); Bilal Shafayat 2/28 (7 overs)

Glamorgan won by 5 wickets
County Cricket Ground, Northampton
Umpires: Allan Jones and Nigel Llong

- Northamptonshire won the toss and elected to bat.
- Points: Glamorgan 4, Northamptonshire 0.

Glamorgan Dragons bowler David Harrison bowled a fierce spell which only conceded 17 runs in nine overs – including five runs to extras – as Glamorgan limited the hosts Northamptonshire Steelbacks to 201 all out at Sophia Gardens. Northamptonshire's Riki Wessels hit 80 off 72 balls to take the score past 200 before lofting the ball to Dan Cherry to be last out. However, his 54-run partnership with Johann Louw gave Northamptonshire some hope of posing a challenge. Wickets fell with reasonable regularity, but captain Robert Croft refused to be dismissed, and his 81 not out anchored the chase. Richard Grant scored 22 not out as well, as Glamorgan made it to the target with 20 deliveries to spare, despite two wickets from Bilal Shafayat.

==== Glamorgan v Gloucestershire (23 August) ====
23 August 2005 (D/N)
Scorecard

Gloucestershire; 194/9 (45 overs)	v	Glamorgan; 197/6 (43 overs)
Alex Gidman 62 (83); Dean Cosker 3/31 (9 overs)		Mike Powell 69* (94); Jon Lewis 3/35 (9 overs)

Glamorgan won by 4 wickets
Sophia Gardens, Cardiff
Umpires: Jeff Evans and Jeremy Lloyds

- Gloucestershire won the toss and elected to bat.
- Points: Glamorgan 4, Gloucestershire 0.

Gloucestershire Gladiators crashed back into the relegation zone with a defeat against Glamorgan Dragons at Sophia Gardens, succumbing to medium-pace bowler David Harrison, who bowled four maiden overs to end with bowling figures of 9–4–16–2. Despite half-centuries from Kabir Ali and Alex Gidman, who looked to give the visitors a comfortable target after moving to 103/3, Dean Cosker ripped out three quick wickets, and Gidman was forced to consolidate. He did top score with 62, but Glamorgan were set a rather modest target of 195 to win. Jon Lewis made inroads with his medium pace early on, taking three wickets as Glamorgan stuttered to 40/4, but Mike Powell and Dan Cherry put Glamorgan back in it with a 79-run stand, and Gloucestershire's bowlers were made to rue their 15 wides, as they helped Glamorgan to reach their target with two overs remaining.

==== Glamorgan v Northamptonshire (4 September) ====
4 September 2005
Scorecard

Northamptonshire; 282/7 (45 overs)	v	Glamorgan; 22/1 (5.3 overs)
David Sales 77 (79); Andrew Davies 4/53 (8 overs)		Alex Wharf 11* (8); Damien Wright 1/15 (3 overs)

No result
Sophia Gardens, Cardiff
Umpires: Barrie Leadbeater and George Sharp

- Glamorgan won the toss and elected to field.
- Points: Glamorgan 2, Northamptonshire 2.

Northamptonshire Steelbacks had set a target of 283 when rain intervened at Sophia Gardens. Having been put in to bat by Glamorgan Dragons captain Robert Croft, they got themselves to 155/2 thanks to fifties from Usman Afzaal and David Sales, and to finish the innings off Bilal Shafayat and Riki Wessels recorded scores at run rates higher than six an over. Wessels spent 20 deliveries for his unbeaten 43, while Shafayat got a run-a-ball 31. For Glamorgan, Alex Wharf got three wickets, but conceded 71 runs from nine overs, while Andrew Davies was almost as expensive with 53 from eight overs, but took four wickets. Glamorgan saw off 33 balls from Northamptonshire in chase of 283 to win, losing Croft for 1 as they made their way to 22/1, but rain then put an end to play and Glamorgan took two points from the game.

==== Middlesex v Glamorgan (11 September) ====
11 September 2005
Scorecard

Middlesex; 239/5 (45 overs)	v	Glamorgan; 234 (43.4 overs)
Owais Shah 66 (72); Dean Cosker 2/31 (8 overs)		Mike Powell 83* (104); Scott Styris 4/56 (8.4 overs)

Middlesex won by 5 runs
Lord's, London
Umpires: Graham Burgess and Jeff Evans

- Glamorgan won the toss and elected to field.
- Points: Middlesex 4, Glamorgan 0.

Scott Styris conceded 56 runs with the ball for Middlesex Crusaders in this National League game, but his four wickets near the end cut short Glamorgan's chase to bring Middlesex to victory. The Crusaders had been inserted by Glamorgan Dragons captain Robert Croft, against a Dragons side whose National League season had seen their best performances, as both Championship, Twenty20 and C&G had seen them finish below ninth. After Ed Smith departed for 6, fifties from Paul Weekes and Owais Shah sent Middlesex to 133/1. Dean Cosker took two quick wickets, but 37 off 27 balls from left-hander Ed Joyce helped Middlesex to a total of 239/5. Peter Trego then removed both openers, before Alex Wharf took him for runs (ending with 40 off 20 balls), and Trego ended with one maiden over, two wickets, and 31 runs off three overs. Wharf was eventually caught by Smith, but David Hemp, Dan Cherry and Richard Grant all added more than 30 in stands with Mike Powell, and at 219/5, Glamorgan needed 21 for the last five wickets. Styris had the last laugh, however, taking three wickets in the late overs and bowling Glamorgan out with eight balls remaining in their quota to leave Powell stranded on 83 not out.

==== Glamorgan v Hampshire (13 September) ====
13 September 2005 (D/N)
Scorecard

Glamorgan; 220/8 (45 overs)	v	Hampshire; 69 (23.2 overs)
Mike Powell 52 (62); Shaun Udal 2/32 (9 overs)		Shaun Udal 20 (35); David Harrison 4/28 (9 overs)

Glamorgan won by 151 runs
Sophia Gardens, Cardiff
Umpires: David Constant and Peter Hartley
Player of the match: David Harrison (Glam)

- Glamorgan won the toss and elected to bat.
- Points: Glamorgan 4, Hampshire 0.

Glamorgan Dragons recorded a victory at their home ground Sophia Gardens, despite the bowling of Sean Ervine and Shaun Udal who took two wickets each and both conceded less than 40 runs. Wicket-keeper Mark Wallace hit one six and one four in an above-run-a-ball 32, while Mike Powell had set the pace with 52 from number four. Hampshire Hawks were then shot down in the chase. David Harrison had John Crawley caught with the second ball of the match, and Andrew Davies followed up, getting Greg Lamb and Ervine caught behind. With James Adams bowled by Harrison, Hampshire had scored seven runs for four wickets, and their lower order could not muster enough runs to chase the target of 221 to win. Jono McLean was the first to hit into double figures, before he too was caught behind off Davies, and Harrison then took two as Hampshire were 33/7. Kevin Latouf and Udal adjusted somewhat, adding 19 for the eighth wicket, but first-change bowler Alex Wharf cleaned them up as well, leaving Hampshire all out for 69 – the lowest score of the National League Division One all season, and giving Glamorgan the highest victory by runs in the division all season.

==== Gloucestershire v Glamorgan (25 September) ====
25 September 2005
Scorecard

Glamorgan; 262/6 (45 overs)	v	Gloucestershire; 263/7 (42.4 overs)
David Hemp 84* (84); Malinga Bandara 2/37 (9 overs)		Craig Spearman 80 (71); Ryan Watkins 2/33 (5 overs)

Gloucestershire won by 3 wickets
County Ground, Bristol
Umpires: David Shepherd and Nigel Llong

- Gloucestershire won the toss and elected to field.
- Points: Gloucestershire 4, Glamorgan 0.

Gloucestershire Gladiators made it past the target set by Glamorgan Dragons to take a victory in their final game of the season, but they were still relegated into Division Two, thus suffering relegation in both forms of cricket. Winning the toss and bowling first, Gloucestershire's spinners Malinga Bandara and Mark Hardinges shared 4/87 in their 18 overs after the opening bowlers Jon Lewis and James Averis went wicketless. Gloucestershire did concede 32 extras, however, as Glamorgan assembled 262/8. Steve Adshead and Kadeer Ali added 86 for Gloucestershire's first wicket, before Craig Spearman took on the Gloucestershire bowlers to hit 80 off 71 balls. Though he was dismissed with the total on 228, Bandara, Lewis and Mark Alleyne added the required runs, as Gloucestershire won with 14 balls to spare.

== Twenty20 Cup ==
Glamorgan began their Twenty20 Cup campaign with a win against eventual champions Somerset Sabres after losing fewer wickets than the Sabres, but lost the next four matches, and after the fifth was rained off they were ensured of not qualifying for the quarter-final stage – although their 5 July win over Gloucestershire Gladiators was one of the main reasons Gloucestershire did not qualify. Their last match with Worcestershire was without any real importance for either team, as both teams were knocked out, but Worcestershire were still allowed to make the fourth-highest score in Twenty20 Cup history – totalling 223.

=== Standings ===
2005 Twenty20 Cup – Midlands/Wales/West Division
Team	Pld	W	L	NR	Pts	NRR
Northamptonshire Steelbacks	8	4	2	2	10	+1.17
Warwickshire Bears	8	4	3	1	9	+0.79
Somerset Sabres	8	4	3	1	9	+1.08
Gloucestershire Gladiators	8	3	3	2	8	−1.44
Worcestershire Royals	8	3	4	1	7	−0.46
Glamorgan Dragons	8	2	5	1	5	−1.09

=== Matches ===
==== Glamorgan v Somerset (22 June) ====
22 June 2005 (D/N)
Scorecard

Somerset; 183 (18.4 overs)	v	Glamorgan; 183/8 (20 overs)
James Hildreth 46 (26); Alex Wharf 3/38 (3 overs)		Mike Powell 68* (39); James Hildreth 3/24 (3 overs)

Glamorgan won (lost fewer wickets)
Sophia Gardens, Cardiff
Umpires: Barry Dudleston and Vanburn Holder

- Glamorgan won the toss and elected to field.
- Michael Parsons (Somst) and Sourav Ganguly (Glam) made their T20 debuts.
- Points: Glamorgan 2, Somerset 0.

James Hildreth was the quickest scorer for the Sabres, making 46 off 26 deliveries at Sophia Gardens as Somerset Sabres made a total of 183 to Glamorgan Dragons. Alex Wharf took three wickets for Glamorgan, the most, but conceded 38 in three overs to be Glamorgan's most expensive bowler too. A highlight of Somerset's innings was the effort of their number 9 Gareth Andrew, who smashed three fours in his first three balls and then was bowled with the fourth. In reply, Glamorgan got to 126/2 before fifth- and sixth-change bowlers Keith Parsons and Hildreth got the better of them and shared five wickets, leaving Glamorgan at 167/7. However, Alex Wharf hung in there with Mike Powell, making 11 off five balls before he was caught off the sixth, and coupled with Powell's unbeaten 68 Glamorgan finished on a total of 183/8 after the 20 overs were up. The crowd seemed content with the one point and a tie, but the speaker informed the crowd of the actual result, that under Twenty20 Cup rules the team with the fewer wickets lost would win.

==== Gloucestershire v Glamorgan (24 June) ====
24 June 2005
Scorecard

Glamorgan; 128/9 (20 overs)	v	Gloucestershire; 132/3 (17.1 overs)
Robert Croft 38* (29); Carl Greenidge 3/15 (4 overs)		Craig Spearman 39 (30); Robert Croft 2/23 (4 overs)

Gloucestershire won by 7 wickets
County Ground, Bristol
Umpires: George Sharp and Mervyn Kitchen

- Gloucestershire won the toss and elected to field.
- Phil Weston (Glos) made his T20 debut.
- Points: Gloucestershire 2, Glamorgan 0.

Glamorgan Dragons lost their first nine wickets for 90 runs, as the bowling of Gloucestershire Gladiators' Carl Greenidge, Martyn Ball and Mark Hardinges took more than two wickets each. Greenidge also bowled a maiden over, ending with 3/15. A last-wicket partnership of 38 between Robert Croft and Dean Cosker ensured that Glamorgan batted out 20 overs, finishing on 128/9. However, they could not defend it – Croft took two wickets with his off spin, but Craig Spearman's 39 was the highest score as the Gladiators took the victory with 17 balls to spare.

==== Glamorgan v Warwickshire (25 June) ====
25 June 2005
Scorecard

Warwickshire; 205/7 (20 overs)	v	Glamorgan; 151 (18.2 overs)
Jim Troughton 42 (28); Alex Wharf 2/38 (4 overs)		Matthew Elliott 51 (32); Alex Loudon 5/33 (4 overs)

Warwickshire won by 54 runs
St Helen's, Swansea
Umpires: George Sharp and Nigel Cowley

- Glamorgan won the toss and elected to field.
- Ian Westwood and James Anyon (Warks) made their T20 debuts.
- Points: Warwickshire 2, Glamorgan 0.

Warwickshire Bears won their first Twenty20 match of the season, the deep batting line-up finally paying off. Almost every batsman contributed in their total of 205/7, Jamie Troughton top-scoring with 42, and no Glamorgan Dragons bowler escaped their wrath. When the Dragons batted, only Matthew Elliott and Sourav Ganguly gave them any hope of winning, and Ganguly's 36 off 35 balls was much slower than the required rate, which was above 10 an over. A disciplined Warwickshire fielding effort – the Bears only conceded one extra – and Alex Loudon taking 5/33, resulted in Glamorgan falling to 151 all out in 18.2 overs.

==== Somerset v Glamorgan (27 June) ====
27 June 2005
Scorecard

Somerset; 212/3 (20 overs)	v	Glamorgan; 123 (17.4 overs)
James Hildreth 71 (37); David Harrison 2/29 (4 overs)		Sourav Ganguly 35 (28); Ian Blackwell 4/26 (4 overs)

Somerset won by 89 runs
County Ground, Taunton
Umpires: John Holder and Barry Dudleston
Player of the match: Ian Blackwell (Somst)

- Somerset won the toss and elected to bat.
- Points: Somerset 2, Glamorgan 0.

James Hildreth hit his second quick knock against Glamorgan in a week, taking 71 runs off 37 balls to lift Somerset Sabres to a victory at Taunton. Along with Keith Parsons making 57 off 28, they made a dent in the theory that spinners are useful in Twenty20 cricket, as experienced off-spinner Robert Croft was dispatched for 50 runs in four overs. The slow left arm bowler Dean Cosker was also taken for 45 in his four, and Somerset made a total of 212/3. In reply, the visitors had no one to pass 30 once Mike Powell went, Ian Blackwell taking four Glamorgan Dragons wickets for 26 runs as the Welshmen crumbled to 123 all out, Sourav Ganguly top-scoring with 35.

==== Warwickshire v Glamorgan (30 June) ====
30 June 2005
Scorecard

Warwickshire; 169/9 (20 overs)	v	Glamorgan; 165/9 (20 overs)
Jim Troughton 51 (35); Sourav Ganguly 3/27 (4 overs)		Matthew Elliott 41 (32); Neil Carter 3/17 (4 overs)

Warwickshire won by 4 runs
Edgbaston Cricket Ground, Birmingham
Umpires: Allan Jones and Peter Hartley

- Glamorgan won the toss and elected to field.
- Points: Warwickshire 2, Glamorgan 0.

Glamorgan Dragons lengthened their run of losses to four, despite requiring 22 for the last seven wickets at Edgbaston. Jamie Troughton's 51 took Warwickshire Bears past 100 after they had lost their first four wickets for 56, and Dougie Brown along with 11 extras gave the hosts a total of 169/9. Glamorgan started well, with Sourav Ganguly and Matthew Elliott lifting them to 88/1 before leaving in quick succession to Neil Carter and Jonathan Trott respectively. Mike Powell and David Hemp (40 off 19 balls) then built another partnership of 59 to see Glamorgan 147/3, but Carter and Brown then shared five wickets as Glamorgan's next five wickets fell for six runs. Powell added 11 with Dean Cosker, but the damage was already done, and Powell was run out on the penultimate ball as they needed six runs from two balls. Adam Harrison needed to hit the final ball for six, but only managed a single.

==== Glamorgan v Northamptonshire (1 July) ====
1 July 2005 (D/N)
Scorecard

Glamorgan	v	Northamptonshire

Match abandoned without a ball bowled
Sophia Gardens, Cardiff
Umpires: Ian Gould and Roy Palmer

- No toss.
- Rain prevented any play.
- Points: Glamorgan 1, Northamptonshire 1.

The weather at Sophia Gardens in Cardiff prevented a match from getting underway between Glamorgan Dragons and Northamptonshire Steelbacks, resulting in the Dragons being knocked out.

==== Glamorgan v Gloucestershire (5 July) ====
5 July 2005 (D/N)
Scorecard

Gloucestershire; 128 (18.1 overs)	v	Glamorgan; 129/0 (12.3 overs)
Jon Lewis 34 (24); Adam Harrison 2/12 (3.1 overs)		Robert Croft 62* (44)

Glamorgan won by 10 wickets
Sophia Gardens, Cardiff
Umpires: Barrie Leadbeater and John Steele

- Glamorgan won the toss and elected to field.
- Points: Glamorgan 2, Gloucestershire 0.

Glamorgan Dragons broke their streak of five successive matches without a win as they achieved victory without any of their batsmen getting dismissed at Sophia Gardens. The two brothers David and Adam Harrison took two wickets each for Glamorgan, as Gloucestershire Gladiators lost their first seven wickets for 57. Jon Lewis and Mark Alleyne then shared a 68-run stand, but a quick burst of wickets from Robert Croft and Andrew Davies saw them bowled out for 128. Croft and Matthew Elliott both made fifties as Glamorgan knocked off the runs with ten wickets and 7.3 overs to spare, helped by five no-balls and four wides from the Gloucestershire bowlers.

==== Worcestershire v Glamorgan (6 July) ====
6 July 2005
Scorecard

Worcestershire; 223/9 (20 overs)	v	Glamorgan; 186/5 (20 overs)
Ben Smith 105 (45); Richard Grant 4/38 (4 overs)		Mike Powell 51 (34); Daryl Mitchell 2/31 (3 overs)

Worcestershire won by 37 runs
New Road, Worcester
Umpires: Barrie Leadbeater and John Steele

- Worcestershire won the toss and elected to bat.
- Points: Worcestershire 2, Glamorgan 0.

Both Worcestershire Royals and Glamorgan Dragons were knocked out before the last round of the Twenty20 Cup group stage, so the result of the match at New Road was academic. It did not stop Worcestershire from amassing the fourth-highest total in Twenty20 Cup history with 223/9 – Ben Smith taking 45 balls to smack 105 off the Glamorgan bowlers, with twelve fours and six sixes, as he lifted his career Twenty20 average from 15 to 20.62. The partnership of 149 with Graeme Hick was enough to win the match for Worcestershire, as Glamorgan failed to score quickly enough Worcestershire and Pakistan fast bowler Shoaib Akhtar – who bowled two overs for 14 with a no-ball and a wide. Glamorgan ended up by losing five wickets in 20 overs, but 224 was too high a rate after Akhtar's seven-an-over spell, and they finished with a total 186/5.

== C&G Trophy ==
=== First round: Suffolk v Glamorgan (4 May) ===
4 May 2005
Scorecard

Glamorgan; 320/5 (50 overs)	v	Suffolk; 177/8 (50 overs)
Matthew Elliott 100* (104); Trevor Smith 2/37 (10 overs)		Chris Warn 45 (67); David Harrison 2/16 (6 overs)

Glamorgan won by 143 runs
Victory Ground, Bury St Edmunds
Umpires: Dean Johnson and Mark Benson
Player of the match: Matthew Elliott (Glam)

- Suffolk won the toss and elected to field.
- Timothy Catley (Sfolk) made his List A debut.

After rain, play began at 3 p.m. at Bury St Edmunds with Glamorgan batting first. The highlight of their innings was an undefeated 100 from Matthew Elliott in 104 balls, with six of seven batsmen passing 20 as the visitors racked up 320/5. Mike Powell was the only Glamorgan batsman to not pass 20, as he was dismissed for a duck by former Essex bowler Andrew McGarry. Suffolk lost their first four batsmen – including New Zealand international Lou Vincent – for single-figure scores, going to 12/3 and then 33/4, and to spare the need for the match going into a second day, play continued in near-darkness to 8:40 p.m., with Glamorgan bowling their last 32 overs (all with spin, in order to make conditions playable for batsmen) in 80 minutes. Staffordshire finally finished on 177/8 off their 50 overs, with their numbers six, eight and nine in the order all passing 35.

=== Second round: Glamorgan v Hampshire (17 May) ===
17 May 2005
Scorecard

Glamorgan; 214 (48.4 overs)	v	Hampshire; 219/4 (39.1 overs)
Mike Powell 56 (73); Sean Ervine 5/50 (10 overs)		Nic Pothas 114* (127); Andrew Davies 2/30 (7 overs)

Hampshire won by 6 wickets
Sophia Gardens, Cardiff
Umpires: Barry Dudleston and Vanburn Holder
Player of the match: Nic Pothas (Hants)

- Glamorgan won the toss and elected to bat.

Zimbabwean all-rounder Sean Ervine and wicket-keeper Nic Pothas made the most impact with ball and bat respectively for Hampshire as they defeated Glamorgan at Cardiff. Mike Powell was the only batsman to pass 40, making 56 runs in a little over an hour in a Glamorgan total of 214, while Ervine took 5/50 from his 10 overs – admittedly mostly tail-enders, but he got the most wickets – while Chris Tremlett also took 3/32. Pothas then notched up the first limited-overs century of the Hampshire season, scoring 114 not out off 127 balls and standing tall while Glamorgan's fast bowlers Andrew Davies and Simon Jones made inroads with the ball – Hampshire were 89/4 before England prospect Kevin Pietersen came in to hit 69 off 64 balls, including four sixes, as he shared a 130-run partnership with Pothas. Thanks to the quick scoring of Pothas and Pietersen, Hampshire won with nearly 11 overs to spare.

== Pre-season and friendlies ==
=== MCC University Match: Glamorgan v Cardiff UCCE (9–11 April) ===
9–11 April 2005
Scorecard

Glamorgan	v	Cardiff UCCE
603 (109.4 overs); Ian Thomas 133 (126); Luke Sellers 5/135 (27 overs)		152 (49.4 overs); Christopher Smith 62 (93); Dean Cosker 3/13 (8.4 overs)
381/3d (63 overs); Mark Wallace 117 (135); Michael Clayden 2/80 (9 overs)		257/3 (71.2 overs); Simon Butler 104*

Match drawn
Sophia Gardens, Cardiff
Umpires: Richard Kettleborough and Trevor Jesty

- Cardiff UCCE won the toss and elected to field.

On the first day of this match at Sophia Gardens, Glamorgan scored runs at nearly six an over as David Hemp (120), Matthew Maynard (105) and Ian Thomas (133) all making centuries. They continued on the second day, adding 87 for the last three wickets to end with a total of 603, until Cardiff UCCE finally dismissed them – before they were bowled out for 152 in reply, spinner Dean Cosker taking three wickets for 13 runs. However, Glamorgan chose not to enforce the follow-on and elected for more batting practice. By close of play they were 134 for no loss. On the third and final day, Mark Wallace and Jonathan Hughes both completed their centuries, making 117 and 109 (retired hurt) respectively. Glamorgan eventually declared on 381/3 after 28 third-day overs, leaving Cardiff UCCE an unlikely 833 to win – before Andrew Davies nipped out a wicket after five minutes. After Simon Jones got another, and Cardiff UCCE were 57/2, Rhodri Lloyd and Simon Butler got together for three hours, until the end of the match. When Lloyd was out for 102, Butler was on 104, and the game ended in a draw.

=== Tour match: Glamorgan v Bangladesh A (26–28 July) ===
26–28 July 2005
Scorecard

Glamorgan	v	Bangladesh A
380 (90.1 overs); Mike Powell 111 (145); Syed Rasel 4/89 (22.1 overs)		54/2 (10.1 overs); Shahriar Nafees 20* (25); Andrew Davies 2/17 (5.1 overs)

Match drawn
Pen-y-Pound, Abergavenny
Umpires: Darrell Hair and Mervyn Kitchen

- Glamorgan won the toss and elected to bat.
- Only 11 overs were possible on day 2 and no play was possible on day 3 due to rain.
- Mike O'Shea and Ryan Watkins (both Glam) made their first-class debuts.

After a first day in which Glamorgan had racked up 380 runs, Mike Powell top-scoring with 111 and Alex Wharf making 77 while Syed Rasel took 4/89, the touring Bangladesh A side were sent in to bat. Only 10.1 overs of play was possible on the second day, though, and Andrew Davies took two wickets while Wharf was taken for 36 runs off just five overs. Day three was rained out, so the match at Abergavenny ended in a draw, with Bangladesh A finishing on 54/2.

== Statistics ==
=== Batting ===
First-class
Player	Matches	Innings	NO	Runs	HS	Ave	SR	100	50	0	4s	6s
David Hemp	16	32	1	1,369	171*	44.16	75.71	3	8	1	189	19
Mike Powell	16	31	2	1,038	111	35.79	57.50	1	6	2	144	8
Dan Cherry	14	27	0	838	226	31.03	48.21	2	1	5	131	4
Matthew Elliott	7	14	0	746	162	53.28	60.35	2	5	1	106	4
Mark Wallace	17	30	2	746	96	26.64	64.14	0	6	3	99	11
Robert Croft	17	30	2	743	90	26.53	55.65	0	3	2	92	5
Jonathan Hughes	13	25	2	511	134*	22.21	45.18	2	0	4	65	1
Sourav Ganguly	5	9	2	438	142	62.57	70.75	1	3	1	52	7
Alex Wharf	12	21	0	430	113	20.47	59.31	1	1	5	58	6
David Harrison	16	29	2	318	75*	11.77	63.09	0	1	6	44	6
Source: ESPNcricinfo

List A
Player	Matches	Innings	NO	Runs	HS	Ave	SR	100	50	0	4s	6s
Mike Powell	16	14	2	488	83*	40.66	81.06	0	5	1	43	7
David Hemp	16	14	5	457	84*	50.77	87.88	0	4	0	41	5
Robert Croft	16	15	1	399	88	28.50	74.30	0	3	1	53	0
Alex Wharf	12	10	1	286	42	31.77	95.97	0	0	0	43	3
Mark Wallace	16	12	5	251	48	35.85	86.85	0	0	1	14	6
Matthew Elliott	7	6	2	231	100*	57.75	82.79	1	0	0	20	6
Dan Cherry	10	9	0	204	42	22.66	59.47	0	0	0	21	1
Richard Grant	12	10	2	157	29	19.62	67.38	0	0	0	17	1
Ian Thomas	5	5	0	126	45	25.20	88.11	0	0	0	18	1
David Harrison	15	8	1	78	18	11.14	76.47	0	0	0	3	4
Source: ESPNcricinfo

Twenty20
Player	Matches	Innings	NO	Runs	HS	Ave	SR	100	50	0	4s	6s
Matthew Elliott	7	7	1	213	52*	35.50	137.41	0	2	1	28	6
Mike Powell	7	6	1	178	68*	35.60	132.83	0	2	1	16	4
Robert Croft	7	7	2	153	62*	30.60	131.89	0	1	1	18	6
Sourav Ganguly	6	5	0	114	36	22.80	112.87	0	0	1	14	3
David Hemp	7	6	0	85	40	14.16	154.54	0	0	0	5	6
Ian Thomas	4	4	0	53	32	13.25	98.14	0	0	0	7	0
Mark Wallace	7	6	2	46	11	11.50	131.42	0	0	0	6	0
Dan Cherry	1	1	1	43	43*	—	153.57	0	0	0	3	2
Richard Grant	2	1	0	36	36	36.00	133.33	0	0	0	3	2
Alex Wharf	3	3	0	19	11	6.33	158.33	0	0	0	2	1
Dean Cosker	7	4	3	19	10*	19.00	111.76	0	0	0	2	0
Source: ESPNcricinfo

=== Bowling ===
First-class
Player	Matches	Innings	Overs	Maidens	Runs	Wickets	BBI	BBM	Ave	Econ	SR	5w	10w
Robert Croft	17	25	577.4	77	2,134	43	5/57	10/160	49.62	3.69	80.60	2	1
Alex Wharf	12	19	297.2	40	1,245	28	6/59	11/121	44.46	4.18	63.71	2	1
Dean Cosker	12	17	395.4	60	1,405	28	4/57	5/105	50.17	3.55	84.78	0	0
David Harrison	16	27	387.3	64	1,547	27	5/117	5/83	57.29	3.99	86.11	1	0
Andrew Davies	7	11	168.1	30	664	13	3/121	5/197	51.07	3.94	77.61	0	0
Huw Waters	7	6	100.0	15	332	11	4/75	4/75	30.18	3.32	54.54	0	0
Simon Jones	3	5	93.4	19	322	10	3/62	4/104	32.20	3.43	56.20	0	0
Darren Thomas	7	11	122.3	9	611	9	3/63	3/69	67.88	4.98	81.66	0	0
Ryan Watkins	5	5	37.0	5	125	3	2/14	2/14	41.66	3.37	74.00	0	0
Sourav Ganguly	5	6	38.0	4	148	3	3/68	3/73	49.33	3.89	76.00	0	0
Source: ESPNcricinfo

List A
Player	Matches	Innings	Overs	Maidens	Runs	Wickets	BBI	Ave	Econ	SR	4w	5w
David Harrison	15	15	111.4	12	442	23	5/33	19.21	3.95	29.13	1	1
Alex Wharf	12	12	86.0	3	506	18	3/71	28.11	5.88	28.66	0	0
Andrew Davies	16	16	122.0	7	651	18	4/53	36.16	5.33	40.66	1	0
Dean Cosker	16	15	115.1	1	568	15	3/31	37.86	4.93	46.06	0	0
Robert Croft	16	15	116.4	2	534	12	3/54	44.50	4.57	58.33	0	0
Simon Jones	3	3	26.2	3	118	5	3/19	23.60	4.48	31.60	0	0
Ryan Watkins	3	3	13.2	0	76	3	2/33	25.33	5.70	26.66	0	0
Darren Thomas	5	5	21.0	2	127	3	1/14	42.33	6.04	42.00	0	0
Sourav Ganguly	3	3	12.0	0	65	2	1/19	32.50	5.41	36.00	0	0
Ian Thomas	5	1	6.0	1	24	1	1/24	24.00	4.00	36.00	0	0
Richard Grant	12	5	15.0	0	105	1	1/18	105.00	7.00	90.00	0	0
Source: ESPNcricinfo

Twenty20
Player	Matches	Innings	Overs	Maidens	Runs	Wickets	BBI	Ave	Econ	SR	4w	5w
Robert Croft	7	7	23.0	0	217	9	2/23	24.11	9.43	15.33	0	0
Andrew Davies	7	7	25.5	1	230	8	2/32	28.75	8.90	19.37	0	0
David Harrison	4	4	16.0	0	104	7	2/17	14.85	6.50	13.71	0	0
Sourav Ganguly	6	6	13.0	0	104	5	3/27	20.80	8.00	15.60	0	0
Adam Harrison	3	3	11.1	1	92	5	2/12	18.40	8.23	13.40	0	0
Alex Wharf	3	3	11.0	0	112	5	3/38	22.40	10.18	13.20	0	0
Dean Cosker	7	6	19.0	0	184	4	2/30	46.00	9.68	28.50	0	0
Richard Grant	2	2	5.0	0	50	4	4/38	12.50	10.00	7.50	1	0
Darren Thomas	4	4	10.0	0	119	1	1/49	119.00	11.90	60.00	0	0
Source: ESPNcricinfo
