= 2004 Twenty20 Cup =

- Dates: 2 July 2004 – 7 August 2004
- Administrator: England and Wales Cricket Board
- Cricket format: Twenty20
- Tournament format(s): Group stage and knockout
- Champions: Leicestershire Foxes (1st title)
- Participants: 18
- Matches: 52
- Most runs: Darren Maddy (356 for Leicestershire)
- Most wickets: Adam Hollioake (20 for Surrey)

The 2004 Twenty20 Cup was the second edition of what would later become the T20 Blast competition, England's premier domestic Twenty20 competition.. The finals day took place on 7 August at Edgbaston, Birmingham, and was won by the Leicestershire Foxes.

== Points table ==
Midlands/Wales/West Division
Team	Pld	W	L	T	NR	Pts	NRR
Glamorgan Dragons	5	4	1	0	0	8	+0.439
Warwickshire Bears	5	3	2	0	0	6	+0.611
Worcestershire Royals	5	3	2	0	0	6	–0.275
Somerset Sabres	5	2	2	0	1	5	–0.389
Gloucestershire Gladiators	5	1	3	0	1	3	–0.379
Northamptonshire Steelbacks	5	1	4	0	0	2	–0.464

North Division
Team	Pld	W	L	T	NR	Pts	NRR
Leicestershire Foxes	5	3	1	0	1	7	+0.215
Lancashire Lightning	5	3	2	0	0	6	+0.276
Derbyshire Phantoms	5	2	2	0	1	5	–0.036
Durham Dynamos	5	2	3	0	0	4	+0.265
Nottinghamshire Outlaws	5	2	3	0	0	4	–0.556
Yorkshire Phoenix	5	2	3	0	0	4	–0.108

South Division
Team	Pld	W	L	T	NR	Pts	NRR
Surrey Lions	5	4	0	0	1	9	+2.137
Hampshire Hawks	5	3	2	0	0	6	+0.326
Essex Eagles	5	2	2	0	1	5	+0.529
Kent Spitfires	5	2	3	0	0	4	–0.207
Middlesex Crusaders	5	1	3	0	1	3	–1.235
Sussex Sharks	5	1	3	0	1	3	–1.716

== Fixtures ==
=== Group stage ===
==== Midlands/Wales/West Division ====
2 July
Scorecard

(H) Northamptonshire; 162/5 (20 overs)	v	Glamorgan; 166/5 (19.1 overs)
Martin van Jaarsveld 61* (48); Dean Cosker 2/30 (4 overs)		Darren Thomas 43* (19); Jason Brown 2/17 (4 overs)

Glamorgan won by 5 wickets
County Ground, Northampton

- Northamptonshire won the toss and elected to bat.

2 July
Scorecard

Somerset; 120 (19.5 overs)	v	Warwickshire (H); 101/3 (9.3 overs)
Keith Parsons 31 (32); Brad Hogg 4/9 (3.5 overs)		Neil Carter 42 (23); Neil Hancock 1/9 (1 over)

Warwickshire won by 7 wickets
Edgbaston, Birmingham

- Warwickshire won the toss and elected to field.

2 July
Scorecard

(H) Worcestershire; 184/9 (20 overs)	v	Gloucestershire; 183/5 (20 overs)
Graeme Hick 73 (52); James Averis 2/24 (3 overs)		Steve Adshead 81 (56); Nadeem Malik 2/27 (4 overs)

Worcestershire won by 1 run
County Ground, New Road, Worcester
Umpires: Barry Dudleston and Jeff Evans
Player of the match: Andy Bichel (Worcestershire)

- Gloucestershire won the toss and elected to field.

5 July
Scorecard

Worcestershire; 173/5 (20 overs)	v	Northamptonshire (H); 80/8 (11 overs)
Graeme Hick 116* (65); Johann Louw 2/22 (4 overs)		Johann Louw 17 (9); David Leatherdale 2/15 (2 overs)

Worcestershire won by 21 runs (D/L)
Wardown Park, Luton

- Worcestershire won the toss and elected to bat.

5 July
Scorecard

(H) Somerset; 193/8 (20 overs)	v	Glamorgan; 194/2 (19.3 overs)
James Hildreth 66 (33); Robert Croft 2/40 (4 overs)		Ian Thomas 116* (57); Gareth Andrew 1/31 (3.3 overs)

Glamorgan won by 8 wickets
County Ground, Taunton
Umpires: Barrie Leadbeater and Peter Willey
Player of the match: Ian Thomas (Glamorgan)

- Glamorgan won the toss and elected to field.

8 July
Scorecard

Warwickshire; 152/9 (20 overs)	v	Glamorgan (H); 126 (19 overs)
Brad Hogg 34 (34); Andrew Davies 3/23 (4 overs)		Matthew Maynard 53 (31); Brad Hogg 4/30 (4 overs)

Warwickshire won by 26 runs
Sophia Gardens, Cardiff

- Warwickshire won the toss and elected to bat.

8 July
Scorecard

(H) Northamptonshire; 42/5 (5 overs)	v	Gloucestershire; 44/2 (4.1 overs)
Martin van Jaarsveld 27 (14); James Averis 3/7 (1 over)		Tim Hancock 28 (13); Carl Greenidge 1/1 (1 over)

Gloucestershire won by 8 wickets
County Ground, Northampton

- Gloucestershire won the toss and elected to field.

9 July
Scorecard

Somerset; 151 (19.1 overs)	v	Gloucestershire (H)
Matt Wood 50 (38); Ian Fisher 4/22 (4 overs)

No result
The Royal & Sun Alliance County Ground, Bristol

- Gloucestershire won the toss and elected to field.

9 July
Scorecard

(H) Warwickshire; 146 (19.5 overs)	v	Worcestershire; 150/7 (19.3 overs)
Dougie Brown 37 (28); Andy Bichel 3/36 (4 overs)		Vikram Solanki 50 (42); Mark Wagh 2/16 (2.3 overs)

Worcestershire won by 3 wickets
Edgbaston, Birmingham

- Worcestershire won the toss and elected to field.

12 July
Scorecard

(H) Warwickshire; 123/7 (20 overs)	v	Northamptonshire; 125/6 (19 overs)
Jonathan Trott 39 (31); Johann Louw 2/6 (4 overs)		Graeme Swann 35* (26); Brad Hogg 3/12 (4 overs)

Northamptonshire won by 4 wickets
Edgbaston, Birmingham
Umpires: John Holder and Jeremy Lloyds
Player of the match: Graeme Swann (Northamptonshire)

- Northamptonshire won the toss and elected to field.

13 July
Scorecard

(H) Somerset; 178/6 (20 overs)	v	Worcestershire; 144/4 (20 overs)
James Hildreth 51 (32); Kabir Ali 2/25 (4 overs)		David Leatherdale 52* (45); Aaron Laraman 4/15 (4 overs)

Somerset won by 34 runs
County Ground, Taunton

- Somerset won the toss and elected to bat.

14 July
Scorecard

(H) Glamorgan; 162/7 (20 overs)	v	Gloucestershire; 130 (19.1 overs)
David Hemp 43 (35); Jon Lewis 3/21 (4 overs)		Tim Hancock 56 (43); Alex Wharf 3/23 (3.1 overs)

Glamorgan won by 32 runs
Sophia Gardens, Cardiff

- Gloucestershire won the toss and elected to field.

15 July
Scorecard

(H) Gloucestershire; 135/7 (20 overs)	v	Warwickshire; 135/5 (20 overs)
James Franklin 36 (26); Alan Richardson 3/13 (4 overs)		Nick Knight 63 (51); Mike Smith 2/21 (4 overs)

Warwickshire won (lost fewer wickets)
The Royal & Sun Alliance County Ground, Bristol

- Gloucestershire won the toss and elected to bat.

15 July
Scorecard

(H) Somerset; 211/5 (20 overs)	v	Northamptonshire; 207/5 (20 overs)
Marcus Trescothick 56 (29); Ben Phillips 2/33 (4 overs)		Martin van Jaarsveld 61 (40); Keith Dutch 2/25 (4 overs)

Somerset won by 4 runs
County Ground, Taunton

- Somerset won the toss and elected to bat.

15 July
Scorecard

Glamorgan; 140/6 (16 overs)	v	Worcestershire (H); 120 (14.1 overs)
Matthew Maynard 44 (34); Gareth Batty 2/14 (2 overs)		Kabir Ali 49 (28); Andrew Davies 3/17 (3.1 overs)

Glamorgan won by 20 runs (D/L)
County Ground, New Road, Worcester
Umpires: Peter Hartley and Vanburn Holder
Player of the match: Kabir Ali (Worcestershire)

- Glamorgan won the toss and elected to bat.

==== North Division ====
2 July
Scorecard

(H) Derbyshire; 133/8 (20 overs)	v	Yorkshire; 108/9 (15 overs)
Hasan Adnan 32 (27); Matthew Hoggard 3/23 (4 overs)		Phil Jaques 36* (37); Mohammad Ali 2/16 (3 overs)

Yorkshire won by 1 wicket
County Ground, Derby

- Derbyshire won the toss and elected to bat.

2 July
Scorecard

Leicestershire; 139/9 (19 overs)	v	Lancashire (H); 131/6 (19 overs)
Darren Maddy 51 (27); Dinesh Mongia 3/19 (4 overs)		Dinesh Mongia 47 (36); Jeremy Snape 2/13 (4 overs)

Leicestershire won by 8 runs
Old Trafford, Manchester

- Lancashire won the toss and elected to field.

2 July
Scorecard

Durham; 120 (19.4 overs)	v	Nottinghamshire (H); 122/7 (19.1 overs)
Phil Mustard 64 (46); Richard Logan 2/7 (1.4 overs)		Kevin Pietersen 67 (48); Graeme Bridge 2/16 (4 overs)

Nottinghamshire won by 3 wickets
Trent Bridge, Nottingham

- Nottinghamshire won the toss and elected to field.

7 July
Scorecard

Durham; 138/4 (20 overs)	v	Leicestershire (H); 97/9 (20 overs)
Jon Lewis 49* (44); Jonathan Dakin 1/11 (2 overs)		Mark Cleary 24* (27); Neil Killeen 4/7 (4 overs)

Durham won by 41 runs
Grace Road, Leicester

- Durham won the toss and elected to bat.

7 July
Scorecard

Yorkshire; 207/7 (20 overs)	v	Nottinghamshire (H); 210/7 (19.5 overs)
Matthew Wood 96* (62); Richard Logan 2/31 (2 overs)		Mark Ealham 91 (35); Steve Kirby 2/22 (4 overs)

Nottinghamshire won by 3 wickets
Trent Bridge, Nottingham

- Nottinghamshire won the toss and elected to field.

8 July
Scorecard

(H) Derbyshire; 142/4 (20 overs)	v	Lancashire; 144/5 (17.1 overs)
Jon Moss 39 (26); Dinesh Mongia 2/15 (4 overs)		Dinesh Mongia 50 (34); Mohammad Ali 3/27 (4 overs)

Lancashire won by 5 wickets
County Ground, Derby

- Lancashire won the toss and elected to field.

8 July
Scorecard

Leicestershire; 221/3 (20 overs)	v	Yorkshire (H); 211/6 (20 overs)
Darren Maddy 111 (60); Steve Kirby 2/37 (4 overs)		Phil Jaques 92 (49); Mark Cleary 3/43 (4 overs)

Leicestershire won by 10 runs
Headingley, Leeds

- Leicestershire won the toss and elected to bat.

9 July
Scorecard

(H) Durham; 111/8 (20 overs)	v	Lancashire; 112/5 (18.2 overs)
Andrew Pratt 35 (27); Chris Schofield 2/9 (2 overs)		Carl Hooper 49* (49); Graeme Bridge 2/20 (3.2 overs)

Lancashire won by 5 wickets
Riverside Ground, Chester-le-Street

- Lancashire won the toss and elected to field.

9 July
Scorecard

Derbyshire; 163/7 (20 overs)	v	Nottinghamshire (H); 154/8 (20 overs)
Jon Moss 68 (43); Gareth Clough 2/33 (4 overs)		Kevin Pietersen 32 (26); Mohammad Ali 2/28 (4 overs)

Derbyshire won by 9 runs
Trent Bridge, Nottingham

- Nottinghamshire won the toss and elected to field.

13 July
Scorecard

(H) Durham; 117/9 (20 overs)	v	Derbyshire; 118/6 (18.3 overs)
Gary Pratt 36 (38); Mohammad Ali 3/24 (4 overs)		James Bryant 41 (41); Mark Davies 2/28 (4 overs)

Derbyshire won by 4 wickets
Riverside Ground, Chester-le-Street

- Derbyshire won the toss and elected to field.

13 July
Scorecard

(H) Leicestershire; 150/7 (20 overs)	v	Nottinghamshire; 110 (19.2 overs)
Darren Stevens 31 (24); Gareth Clough 2/25 (4 overs)		Chris Read 26 (22); Charlie Dagnall 4/22 (4 overs)

Leicestershire won by 40 runs
Grace Road, Leicester
Umpires: Peter Hartley and Peter Willey
Player of the match: Charlie Dagnall (Leicestershire)

- Leicestershire won the toss and elected to bat.

14 July
Scorecard

Lancashire; 168 (19.1 overs)	v	Yorkshire (H); 170/2 (17.5 overs)
Andrew Flintoff 85 (48); Andy Gray 3/18 (3.1 overs)		Ian Harvey 108* (59); Dominic Cork 1/23 (2 overs)

Yorkshire won by 8 wickets
Headingley, Leeds
Umpires: Ian Gould and Jeremy Lloyds
Player of the match: Ian Harvey (Yorkshire)

- Yorkshire won the toss and elected to field.

15 July
Scorecard

(H) Derbyshire	v	Leicestershire

Match abandoned without a ball bowled
County Ground, Derby

- No toss.

15 July
Scorecard

Yorkshire; 126/7 (20 overs)	v	Durham (H); 129/3 (18.2 overs)
Victor Craven 44* (47); Mark Davies 2/14 (4 overs)		Phil Mustard 42 (34); Richard Dawson 1/21 (3 overs)

Durham won by 7 wickets
Riverside Ground, Chester-le-Street

- Yorkshire won the toss and elected to bat.

15 July
Scorecard

Nottinghamshire; 79/5 (8 overs)	v	Lancashire (H); 82/3 (6.5 overs)
Chris Read 34* (21); Dominic Cork 3/9 (1 over)		Andrew Flintoff 31 (11); Kevin Pietersen 2/9 (1 over)

Lancashire won by 7 wickets
Old Trafford, Manchester

- Lancashire won the toss and elected to field.

==== South Division ====
2 July
Scorecard

Middlesex; 155/7 (18 overs)	v	Kent (H); 157/3 (13.1 overs)
Chad Keegan 42 (16); Martin Saggers 2/14 (4 overs)		Andrew Symonds 112 (43); Tim Bloomfield 2/46 (4 overs)

Kent won by 7 wickets
Mote Park, Maidstone

- Kent won the toss and elected to field.

2 July (D/N)
Scorecard

(H) Essex; 135/9 (18 overs)	v	Hampshire; 95 (15 overs)
Ronnie Irani 36 (23); Dimitri Mascarenhas 3/22 (4 overs)		John Crawley 21 (23); Graham Napier 3/13 (3 overs)

Essex won by 40 runs
County Ground, Chelmsford

- Hampshire won the toss and elected to field.

2 July (D/N)
Scorecard

Surrey; 221/8 (20 overs)	v	Sussex (H); 121 (17.2 overs)
Mark Ramprakash 46 (31); Mark Davis 2/24 (4 overs)		Matt Prior 35 (25); Adam Hollioake 4/14 (3 overs)

Surrey won by 100 runs
County Ground, Hove

- Sussex won the toss and elected to field.

3 July
Scorecard

(H) Surrey; 198/5 (20 overs)	v	Hampshire; 167/9 (20 overs)
Mark Ramprakash 76* (42); James Bruce 3/21 (4 overs)		Dimitri Mascarenhas 47 (36); Adam Hollioake 5/34 (4 overs)

Surrey won by 31 runs
Kennington Oval, London

- Surrey won the toss and elected to bat.

5 July
Scorecard

(H) Kent; 125 (19.2 overs)	v	Essex; 128/2 (15.3 overs)
Shahid Afridi 25 (14); Scott Brant 4/20 (3.2 overs)		Ronnie Irani 64* (52); Andrew Symonds 1/11 (2 overs)

Essex won by 8 wickets
Mote Park, Maidstone

- Kent won the toss and elected to bat.

7 July
Scorecard

(H) Middlesex	v	Sussex

Match abandoned without a ball bowled
Old Deer Park, Richmond

- No toss.

7 July (D/N)
Scorecard

(H) Essex	v	Surrey

Match abandoned without a ball bowled
County Ground, Chelmsford
Umpires: Tony Clarkson and Barry Dudleston

- No toss.

9 July
Scorecard

(H) Surrey; 185/7 (20 overs)	v	Kent; 182/9 (20 overs)
Mark Butcher 60 (40); Amjad Khan 2/41 (4 overs)		Rob Key 66* (38); Adam Hollioake 3/37 (4 overs)

Surrey won by 3 runs
Kennington Oval, London

- Surrey won the toss and elected to bat.

9 July (D/N)
Scorecard

(H) Sussex; 67 (14.5 overs)	v	Hampshire; 69/7 (19 overs)
Chris Adams 37* (34); Dimitri Mascarenhas 5/14 (3.5 overs)		John Crawley 14 (32); James Kirtley 2/8 (4 overs)

Hampshire won by 3 wickets
County Ground, Hove
Umpires: Jeff Evans and Mervyn Kitchen
Player of the match: Dimitri Mascarenhas (Hampshire)

- Sussex won the toss and elected to bat.

12 July
Scorecard

Essex; 120/8 (20 overs)	v	Middlesex (H); 121/1 (18.2 overs)
Andy Flower 47 (51); Simon Cook 2/17 (4 overs)		Paul Weekes 55* (65); Darren Gough 1/23 (4 overs)

Middlesex won by 9 wickets
John Walker's Ground, Southgate

- Middlesex won the toss and elected to field.

13 July
Scorecard

(H) Hampshire; 170/7 (20 overs)	v	Middlesex; 140/8 (20 overs)
Dimitri Mascarenhas 52 (22); Simon Cook 3/25 (4 overs)		Lance Klusener 35* (32); Chris Tremlett 3/20 (4 overs)

Hampshire won by 30 runs
The Rose Bowl, Southampton

- Hampshire won the toss and elected to bat.

13 July
Scorecard

(H) Kent; 163/6 (20 overs)	v	Sussex; 116 (19.5 overs)
Matt Walker 48* (39); James Kirtley 2/21 (4 overs)		Ian Ward 27 (31); Ian Butler 3/19 (3.5 overs)

Kent won by 47 runs
St Lawrence Ground, Canterbury

- Sussex won the toss and elected to field.

15 July
Scorecard

(H) Hampshire; 177/3 (20 overs)	v	Kent; 113/9 (20 overs)
Shane Watson 97* (68); Amjad Khan 2/34 (4 overs)		Matt Walker 38 (34); Dimitri Mascarenhas 3/20 (4 overs)

Hampshire won by 64 runs
The Rose Bowl, Southampton

- Kent won the toss and elected to field.

15 July
Scorecard

Surrey; 183/5 (20 overs)	v	Middlesex (H); 146/7 (20 overs)
Adam Hollioake 65* (41); Paul Weekes 2/20 (4 overs)		Lance Klusener 53 (32); Nayan Doshi 3/26 (4 overs)

Surrey won by 37 runs
Lord's, London

- Middlesex won the toss and elected to field.

15 July (D/N)
Scorecard

(H) Essex; 134/8 (20 overs)	v	Sussex; 136/1 (17 overs)
Mark Pettini 29* (22); Luke Wright 3/39 (4 overs)		Matt Prior 68* (49); Scott Brant 1/10 (3 overs)

Sussex won by 9 wickets
County Ground, Chelmsford

- Essex won the toss and elected to bat.

=== Knockout stage ===
Quarter-finals
S1	Surrey (H)	145/7
M3	Worcestershire	131/8
N2	Lancashire	121/1
S2	Hampshire (H)	120/9
M1	Glamorgan (H)	161/5
M2	Warwickshire	158/7
N1	Leicestershire (H)	180/6
S3	Essex	166/7

Semi-finals
S1	Surrey	133
N2	Lancashire	132/8
M1	Glamorgan	144
N1	Leicestershire	165/5

Final
S1	Surrey	168/6
N1	Leicestershire	169/3

==== Quarter-finals ====
19 July
Scorecard

Warwickshire; 158/7 (20 overs)	v	Glamorgan (H); 161/5 (19 overs)
Brad Hogg 54 (51); Darren Thomas 3/32 (3 overs)		David Hemp 74 (52); Neil Carter 2/25 (4 overs)

Glamorgan won by 5 wickets
Sophia Gardens, Cardiff

- Warwickshire won the toss and elected to bat.

19 July
Scorecard

(H) Hampshire; 120/9 (20 overs)	v	Lancashire; 121/1 (16.3 overs)
Michael Clarke 36 (27); Glen Chapple 2/14 (4 overs)		Mal Loye 64* (56); Billy Taylor 1/14 (3 overs)

Lancashire won by 9 wickets
The Rose Bowl, Southampton
Umpires: Trevor Jesty and George Sharp
Player of the match: Mal Loye (Lancashire)

- Lancashire won the toss and elected to field.

19 July
Scorecard

(H) Leicestershire; 180/6 (20 overs)	v	Essex; 166/7 (20 overs)
Darren Maddy 84 (48); Darren Gough 2/29 (4 overs)		Andy Flower 58 (49); Mark Cleary 3/36 (4 overs)

Leicestershire won by 14 runs
Grace Road, Leicester

- Essex won the toss and elected to field.

19 July
Scorecard

(H) Surrey; 145/7 (20 overs)	v	Worcestershire; 131/8 (20 overs)
Adam Hollioake 45* (29); Nadeem Malik 3/23 (4 overs)		Vikram Solanki 33 (28); Adam Hollioake 3/31 (4 overs)

Surrey won by 14 runs
Kennington Oval, London

- Surrey won the toss and elected to bat.

==== Semi-finals ====
7 August
Scorecard

Surrey; 133 (20 overs)	v	Lancashire; 132/8 (20 overs)
Ali Brown 32 (15); Gary Keedy 3/25 (4 overs)		Carl Hooper 26 (23); Azhar Mahmood 2/22 (4 overs)

Surrey won by 1 run
Edgbaston, Birmingham
Umpires: Ian Gould and John Hampshire
Player of the match: Azhar Mahmood (Surrey)

- Surrey won the toss and elected to bat.

7 August
Scorecard

Leicestershire; 165/5 (20 overs)	v	Glamorgan; 144 (18.5 overs)
Darren Maddy 72 (40); Robert Croft 2/27 (4 overs)		David Hemp 44 (31); Mark Cleary 3/20 (3 overs)

Leicestershire won by 21 runs
Edgbaston, Birmingham
Umpires: John Hampshire and Nigel Llong
Player of the match: Darren Maddy (Leicestershire)

- Leicestershire won the toss and elected to bat.

==== Final ====
7 August (D/N)
Scorecard

Surrey; 168/6 (20 overs)	v	Leicestershire; 169/3 (19.1 overs)
Ali Brown 64 (41); Claude Henderson 2/15 (3 overs)		Brad Hodge 77* (53); Adam Hollioake 2/36 (4 overs)

Leicestershire won by 7 wickets
Edgbaston, Birmingham
Umpires: Ian Gould and Nigel Llong
Player of the match: Brad Hodge (Leicestershire)

- Surrey won the toss and elected to bat.
