= NBC Denis Compton Award =

The NBC Denis Compton Award was an annual award given to 'The Most Promising Young Player' at each of the 18 first-class counties in England and Wales. The award was made between 1996 and 2011. A player may receive the award more than once.

== History ==
The award was born in 1996 when Neil Burns, the former Somerset wicket-keeper-batsman, and now a director of NBC Sports Management Ltd, met Denis Compton while playing for Sir Paul Getty's XI. Burns put forward his ideas for a structured programme that would see promising young English players sent for coaching in South Africa during the English winter. Compton was interested in the proposals, and after the approval of the TCCB was obtained, the first awards were made that same year.

== Recipients ==
=== 1996 ===
- Derbyshire – Andrew Harris
- Durham – Jimmy Daley
- Essex – Robert Rollins
- Glamorgan – Dean Cosker
- Gloucestershire – Robert Cunliffe
- Hampshire – Jason Laney
- Kent – Ben Phillips
- Lancashire – Richard Green
- Leicestershire – Iain Sutcliffe
- Middlesex – Richard Johnson
- Northamptonshire – David Sales
- Nottinghamshire – Usman Afzaal
- Somerset – Marcus Trescothick
- Surrey – Ben Hollioake
- Sussex – Danny Law
- Warwickshire – Ashley Giles
- Worcestershire – Vikram Solanki
- Yorkshire – Chris Silverwood

=== 1997 ===
- Derbyshire – Ben Spendlove
- Durham – Melvyn Betts
- Essex – Ashley Cowan
- Glamorgan – Darren Thomas
- Gloucestershire – Chris Read
- Hampshire – Simon Renshaw
- Kent – Ben Phillips
- Lancashire – Andrew Flintoff
- Leicestershire – Darren Maddy
- Middlesex – Owais Shah
- Northamptonshire – David Roberts
- Nottinghamshire – Paul Franks
- Somerset – Marcus Trescothick
- Surrey – Alex Tudor
- Sussex – James Kirtley
- Warwickshire – Ashley Giles
- Worcestershire – Reuben Spiring
- Yorkshire – Paul Hutchinson

=== 1998 ===
- Derbyshire – Kevin Dean
- Durham – Steve Harmison
- Essex – Stephen Peters
- Glamorgan – Darren Thomas
- Gloucestershire – Matt Windows
- Hampshire – Alex Morris
- Kent – Rob Key
- Lancashire – Chris Schofield
- Leicestershire – James Ormond
- Middlesex – Jamie Hewitt
- Northamptonshire – Graeme Swann
- Nottinghamshire – Paul Franks
- Somerset – Matthew Bulbeck
- Surrey – Alex Tudor
- Sussex – Robin Martin-Jenkins
- Warwickshire – Mark Wagh
- Worcestershire – Matthew Rawnsley
- Yorkshire – Matthew Hoggard

=== 1999 ===
- Derbyshire – Robin Weston
- Durham – Gary Pratt
- Essex – Tim Phillips
- Glamorgan – Mark Wallace
- Gloucestershire – Ben Gannon
- Hampshire – Derek Kenway
- Kent – Alex Loudon
- Lancashire – Chris Schofield
- Leicestershire – James Ormond
- Middlesex – John Maunders
- Northamptonshire – Michael Davies
- Nottinghamshire – Paul Franks
- Somerset – Matthew Bulbeck
- Surrey – Michael Carberry
- Sussex – Robin Martin-Jenkins
- Warwickshire – Ian Bell
- Worcestershire – Chris Liptrot
- Yorkshire – Ryan Sidebottom

=== 2000 ===
- Derbyshire – Luke Sutton
- Durham – Nicky Peng
- Essex – Andrew McGarry
- Glamorgan – Mike Powell
- Gloucestershire – Chris Taylor
- Hampshire – Chris Tremlett
- Kent – David Masters
- Lancashire – Chris Schofield
- Leicestershire – James Ormond
- Middlesex – Edmund Joyce
- Northamptonshire – Toby Bailey
- Nottinghamshire – David Lucas
- Somerset – Peter Trego
- Surrey – Michael Carberry
- Sussex – Robin Martin-Jenkins
- Warwickshire – Ian Bell
- Worcestershire – Kabir Ali
- Yorkshire – Ryan Sidebottom

=== 2001 ===
- Derbyshire – Luke Sutton
- Durham – Nicky Peng
- Essex – James Foster
- Glamorgan – Simon Jones
- Gloucestershire – Steven Pope
- Hampshire – Chris Tremlett
- Kent – Rob Key
- Lancashire – Kyle Hogg
- Leicestershire – Matthew Whiley
- Middlesex – Nick Compton
- Northamptonshire – Monty Panesar
- Nottinghamshire – Bilal Shafayat
- Somerset – Matthew Wood
- Surrey – Tim Murtagh
- Sussex – Matt Prior
- Warwickshire – Ian Bell
- Worcestershire – Kadeer Ali
- Yorkshire – Richard Dawson

=== 2002 ===
- Derbyshire – Luke Sutton
- Durham – Gordon Muchall
- Essex – Will Jefferson
- Glamorgan – Jonathan Hughes
- Gloucestershire – Alex Gidman
- Hampshire – Jon Francis
- Kent – Amjad Khan
- Lancashire – James Anderson
- Leicestershire – Luke Wright
- Middlesex – Nick Compton
- Northamptonshire – Rob White
- Nottinghamshire – Bilal Shafayat
- Somerset – Arul Suppiah
- Surrey – Rikki Clarke
- Sussex – Matt Prior
- Warwickshire – James Troughton
- Worcestershire – Kadeer Ali
- Yorkshire – Tim Bresnan

=== 2003 ===
- Derbyshire – Tom Lungley
- Durham – Liam Plunkett
- Essex – Alastair Cook
- Glamorgan – Adam Harrison
- Gloucestershire – Alex Gidman
- Hampshire – James Tomlinson
- Kent – James Tredwell
- Lancashire – Sajid Mahmood
- Leicestershire – Tom New
- Middlesex – Eoin Morgan
- Northamptonshire – Mark Powell
- Nottinghamshire – Paul McMahon
- Somerset – James Hildreth
- Surrey – James Benning
- Sussex – Matt Prior
- Warwickshire – Graham Wagg
- Worcestershire – Shaftab Khalid
- Yorkshire – Tim Bresnan

=== 2004 ===
- Derbyshire – Nick Walker
- Durham – Ben Harmison
- Essex – Alastair Cook
- Glamorgan – David Harrison
- Gloucestershire – Will Rudge
- Hampshire – Mitchell Stokes
- Kent – Joe Denly
- Lancashire – John Simpson
- Leicestershire – Tom New
- Middlesex – Eoin Morgan
- Northamptonshire – Graeme White
- Nottinghamshire – Mark Footitt
- Somerset – James Hildreth
- Surrey – Jade Dernbach
- Sussex – Luke Wright
- Warwickshire – Moeen Ali
- Worcestershire – Steven Davies
- Yorkshire – Mark Lawson

=== 2005 ===
- Derbyshire – Paul Borrington
- Durham – Liam Plunkett
- Essex – Alastair Cook
- Glamorgan – Mike O'Shea
- Gloucestershire – Steven Snell
- Hampshire – Kevin Latouf
- Kent – Joe Denly
- Lancashire – Tom Smith
- Leicestershire – Stuart Broad
- Middlesex – Billy Godleman
- Northamptonshire – Graeme White
- Nottinghamshire – Mark Footitt
- Somerset – James Hildreth
- Surrey – Rory Hamilton-Brown
- Sussex – Luke Wright
- Warwickshire – Moeen Ali
- Worcestershire – Steven Davies
- Yorkshire – Greg Wood

=== 2006 ===
- Derbyshire – Wayne White
- Durham – Ben Harmison
- Essex – Alastair Cook
- Glamorgan – Ben Wright
- Gloucestershire – Vikram Banerjee
- Hampshire – Chris Benham
- Kent – Joe Denly
- Lancashire – Tom Smith
- Leicestershire – Stuart Broad
- Middlesex – Nick Compton
- Northamptonshire – Mark Nelson
- Nottinghamshire – Mark Footitt
- Somerset – Sam Spurway
- Surrey – Rory Hamilton-Brown
- Sussex – Ollie Rayner
- Warwickshire – Andrew Miller
- Worcestershire – Steven Davies
- Yorkshire – Adil Rashid

=== 2007 ===
- Derbyshire – Paul Borrington
- Durham – Graham Onions
- Essex – Ravi Bopara
- Glamorgan – James Harris
- Gloucestershire – Matthew Gitsham
- Hampshire – Liam Dawson
- Kent – Joe Denly
- Lancashire – Tom Smith
- Leicestershire – Stuart Broad
- Middlesex – Billy Godleman
- Northamptonshire – Graeme White
- Nottinghamshire – Samit Patel
- Somerset – Craig Kieswetter
- Surrey – Chris Jordan
- Sussex – Luke Wright
- Warwickshire – Ian Westwood
- Worcestershire – Steven Davies
- Yorkshire – Adil Rashid

=== 2008 ===
- Derbyshire – John Clare
- Durham – Ben Harmison
- Essex – Tom Westley
- Glamorgan – James Harris
- Gloucestershire – William Porterfield
- Hampshire – Liam Dawson
- Kent – Joe Denly
- Lancashire – Karl Brown
- Leicestershire – Josh Cobb
- Middlesex – Dawid Malan
- Northamptonshire – Alex Wakely
- Nottinghamshire – Alex Hales
- Somerset – Craig Kieswetter
- Surrey – Stuart Meaker
- Sussex – Ollie Rayner
- Warwickshire – Chris Woakes
- Worcestershire – Steven Davies
- Yorkshire – Adil Rashid

=== 2009 ===
- Derbyshire – Dan Redfern
- Durham – Scott Borthwick
- Essex – Tom Westley
- Glamorgan – James Harris
- Gloucestershire – Ian Saxelby
- Hampshire – James Vince
- Kent – Sam Northeast
- Lancashire – Stephen Parry
- Leicestershire – James Taylor
- Middlesex – Steven Finn
- Northamptonshire – David Willey
- Nottinghamshire – Alex Hales
- Somerset – Craig Kieswetter
- Surrey – Jade Dernbach
- Sussex – Rory Hamilton-Brown
- Warwickshire – Chris Woakes
- Worcestershire – Moeen Ali
- Yorkshire – Jonny Bairstow

=== 2010 ===
- Derbyshire – Chesney Hughes
- Durham – Ben Stokes
- Essex – Tom Westley
- Glamorgan – James Harris
- Gloucestershire – David Payne
- Hampshire – Danny Briggs
- Kent – Sam Northeast
- Lancashire – Simon Kerrigan
- Leicestershire – Nathan Buck
- Middlesex – Toby Roland-Jones
- Northamptonshire – Rob Newton
- Nottinghamshire – Alex Hales
- Somerset – Jos Buttler
- Surrey – Stuart Meaker
- Sussex – Ben Brown
- Warwickshire – Chris Woakes
- Worcestershire – Alexei Kervezee
- Yorkshire – Adam Lyth

=== 2011 ===
- Derbyshire – Ross Whiteley
- Durham – Ben Stokes
- Essex – Reece Topley
- Glamorgan – James Harris
- Gloucestershire – David Payne
- Hampshire – Danny Briggs
- Kent – Mat Coles
- Lancashire – Simon Kerrigan
- Leicestershire – Nathan Buck
- Middlesex – John Simpson
- Northamptonshire – Alex Wakely
- Nottinghamshire – Alex Hales
- Somerset – Jos Buttler
- Surrey – Tom Maynard
- Sussex – Luke Wells
- Warwickshire – Chris Woakes
- Worcestershire – Alexei Kervezee
- Yorkshire – Jonny Bairstow

Source: ESPNcricinfo.
