= Spiring =

Spiring is an English surname. Notable people with the surname include:

- Gordon Spiring (1918–1997), English footballer
- Peter Spiring (born 1950), English footballer
- Reuben Spiring (born 1974), English cricketer
