= Dan Cherry =

Welsh cricketer

Personal information
- Full name: Daniel David Cherry
- Born: 7 February 1980 (age 46); Newport, Wales
- Batting: Left-handed
- Bowling: Right-arm medium

Domestic team information
- Years: Team
- 1998–2007: Glamorgan
- 2004–2007: Wales Minor Counties

Career statistics
Competition	FC	LA	T20
Matches	40	22	3
Runs scored	1,824	312	55
Batting average	26.05	15.60	27.50
100s/50s	3/4	0/0	0/0
Top score	226	42	43*
Balls bowled	52	66	6
Wickets	0	1	2
Bowling average	–	91.00	3.00
5 wickets in innings	–	0	0
10 wickets in match	–	0	0
Best bowling	–	1/26	2/6
Catches/stumpings	12/–	5/–	1/–
- Source: Cricinfo, 13 June 2012

Daniel David Cherry (born 7 February 1980) is a Welsh former cricketer. He is a left-handed batsman and a right-arm medium-pace bowler who played for Glamorgan and represented England up to under 17 level.

Cherry debuted for the Glamorgan 2nd XI in 1998 due to a spate of injuries to the Glamorgan team, and subsequently left to read history at Swansea University. He did not appear again until 2002, when he scored a one-day century against Scotland. He struggled to find a consistent place in the first XI in the County Championship and was usually overlooked for one day games, despite his century against Scotland

He was prolific for the 2nd XI in 2004 and fought his way back into the first team in the latter part of the season while a back injury to Matthew Elliott on the morning of Glamorgan's match against Surrey CCC in May 2005 led to his hasty inclusion. He retained his place in the side, scored his maiden first class fifty against Sussex and recorded both his maiden Championship hundred and double-hundred in the 1st innings of Glamorgan's match against Middlesex CCC at Southgate. His score of 226 is the 14th highest in the history of the club, and only eight batsmen have ever made larger scores.

He lost his first team place midway through the 2006 season before returning to the side towards the end of the season. He played in the early matches again in 2007, but failed to command a regular spot and was released from the county's staff to pursue a new career as a crime analyst.

In 40 first class matches he scored 1,824 runs with 3 centuries and a highest score of 226. His overall average was a disappointing 26.05 however and in 22 one day games he scored only 312 runs at 15.60 with a highest score of 42.

== Club cricket ==
After he left Glamorgan, Cherry played for Port Talbot Town in the South Wales Cricket Association. During 2006, Cherry made the highest score by a Port Talbot Town player in a 1st team match when he scored 179 not out against Dafen from 167 balls, eclipsing the previous record of 150 not out set by Bashir Sharif in 1993. During this innings, he was involved in an unbeaten second wicket partnership of 239 with Dean Cox, an all-time record for the club in a 1st team league match. In 2008, Cherry and former Glamorgan colleague Ian Thomas (122 not out) shared an unbeaten opening partnership of 206 to defeat Briton Ferry Steel by 10 wickets, Cherry contributing 72 not out.

Cherry was appointed club captain for the 2009 season and responded by amassing a club record 704 runs from 14 innings at an average of 64, again surpassing Bashir Sharif, who had scored 692 runs during the 1991 campaign. In 2010, still captaining the team, Cherry and Mark Wallace shared an unbroken partnership of 323 for the 3rd wicket against Swansea, a record stand for any wicket in the club's history.

== Later career ==
Cherry was appointed CEO of Glamorgan County Cricket Club early in 2024.
