= Richard Green (cricketer) =

English cricketer

Richard James Green (born 13 March 1976) is a former English cricketer who played 31 matches for Lancashire between 1995 and 2000 mainly as a fast medium bowler and won the coveted NBC Denis Compton Award, which is given to the most promising young player at each of the 18 English first-class counties, in 1996. Green also represented England at junior levels on several occasions. He was born in Warrington, Cheshire. For a number of years, Green has played for Cheshire side Grappenhall, occasionally alongside former teammates Steven Titchard and Neil Fairbrother. He is the team's star batsman and never bowls, presumably because of an injury that may also have played its part in the early conclusion of his county career,

== Cricket ==
- Batting Style: Right Hand Bat
- Bowling Style: Right Arm Medium
