= John Derrick (cricketer) =

Welsh cricketer

Cricket information
- Batting: Right-handed
- Bowling: Right-arm medium

Domestic team information
- Years: Team
- 1983–1991: Glamorgan
- 1986/87: Northern Districts
- 1992–1997: Wales Minor Counties

Career statistics
Competition	First-class	List A
Matches	95	111
Runs scored	1,995	613
Batting average	22.93	11.78
100s/50s	0/11	0/0
Top score	78*	42
Balls bowled	10,055	4,106
Wickets	137	102
Bowling average	38.05	29.34
5 wickets in innings	2	1
10 wickets in match	0	0
Best bowling	6/54	5/32
Catches/stumpings	40/–	21/–
- Source: Cricinfo, 3 February 2023

John Derrick (15 January 1963 – 22 March 2017) was a Welsh cricketer, who played for Glamorgan County Cricket Club. He also spent some time in New Zealand with Northern Districts.

Derrick was born in Cwmaman, and began his playing career with Aberdare Cricket Club. Following his retirement from playing, he became coach of Glamorgan, initially as an assistant to Duncan Fletcher and led them to National League victory in 2002 and 2004 as well as overseeing their promotion to Division One of the County Championship. He left his position as coach in 2007 and in 2007 became national performance director of the Cricket Board of Wales.

He suffered a stroke in 2016 and was found to be suffering from a brain tumour. He died on 22 March 2017 at the age of 54.
