= Richard Grant (cricketer) =

Welsh cricketer (born 1984)

Personal information
- Full name: Richard Neil Grant
- Born: 6 May 1984 (age 42); Neath, Glamorgan, Wales
- Nickname: Granty, Pingu
- Height: 5 ft 10 in (1.78 m)
- Batting: Right-handed
- Bowling: Right-arm medium

Domestic team information
- Years: Team
- 2004–2008: Glamorgan
- 2004–2008: Wales Minor Counties

Career statistics
Competition	FC	LA	T20
Matches	25	41	19
Runs scored	888	679	388
Batting average	21.65	18.86	25.86
100s/50s	0/4	0/0	0/2
Top score	79	45	77
Balls bowled	345	247	63
Wickets	6	7	7
Bowling average	44.66	45.00	18.57
5 wickets in innings	0	0	0
10 wickets in match	0	0	0
Best bowling	1/7	2/21	4/38
Catches/stumpings	10/–	9/–	7/–
- Source: Cricinfo, 13 November 2011

Richard Neil Grant (born 5 June 1984) is a former Welsh cricketer. Grant is a right-handed batsman who bowls right-arm medium pace. He was born at Neath, Glamorgan and was educated at Cefn Saeson Comprehensive and Neath Port Talbot College.

Grant first appeared in first team county cricket in the 2004 season for Wales Minor Counties against Herefordshire. He played a handful of matches for the team in that season's competition. Having played Second XI cricket for Glamorgan since 2001, 2004 also saw him make his first team debut for the county in August in a List A match against Warwickshire in the totesport League. He played a further match in that season's competition against Essex. The following season he made his first-class debut in the County Championship against Middlesex. The 2005 season also saw Grant make his Twenty20 debut against Gloucestershire in the Twenty20 Cup.

Over the coming seasons, he made 24 further first-class appearances, playing his final first-class match against Northamptonshire in the 2008 County Championship. In his 25 first-class matches, Grant who played as an all-rounder, scored 888 runs at an average of 21.65, with a high score of 79. This score, which was one of four fifties, came against Northamptonshire in 2007. With the ball, he took 6 wickets at a bowling average of 44.66, with best figures of 1/7. In List A cricket, he made a total of 41 appearances, playing his final match in that format against Kent in the 2008 NatWest Pro40. In these, Grant scored a total of 679 runs at an average of 18.86, with a high score of 45. With the ball, he took 7 wickets at an average of 45.00, with best figures of 2/21. He made a total of nineteen Twenty20 appearances, playing his final match in that format against Durham in the 2008 Twenty20 Cup. It was in the shortest format of the game that Grant had the most success, scoring 388 runs at an average of 25.86, with a high score of 77. He made two fifties in that format, with his highest score coming against Gloucestershire in the 2006 Twenty20 Cup. With the ball, he took 7 wickets at an average of 18.57, with best figures of 4/38. Having struggled for form in first-class and List A cricket, as well as having been a fringe player in 2007 and 2008 seasons, Grant was released by Glamorgan at the end of the 2008 season.

While playing for Glamorgan he also continued to play Minor counties cricket for Wales Minor Counties between 2004 and 2008, making eleven Minor Counties Championship and five MCCA Knockout Trophy appearances. Grant is now a serving police officer with Dyfed-Powys Police.
