= Mark Wallace (cricketer) =

Welsh cricketer

Personal information
- Full name: Mark Alexander Wallace
- Born: 19 November 1981 (age 44); Abergavenny, Monmouthshire, Wales
- Nickname: Gromit, Wally
- Height: 5 ft 9 in (1.75 m)
- Batting: Left-handed
- Role: Wicket-keeper

Domestic team information
- Years: Team
- 1999–2016: Glamorgan (squad no. 18)
- FC debut: 2 September 1999 Glamorgan v Somerset
- Last FC: 20 September 2016 Glamorgan v Leicestershire
- LA debut: 6 September 1999 Glamorgan v Somerset
- Last LA: 1 August 2016 Glamorgan v Surrey

Career statistics
Competition	FC	LA	T20
Matches	264	205	136
Runs scored	11,159	2,736	1,534
Batting average	28.90	20.41	18.48
100s/50s	15/55	2/7	0/2
Top score	139	118*	69*
Catches/stumpings	707/56	184/45	53/30
- Source: CricketArchive, 16 February 2017

Mark Alexander Wallace (born 19 November 1981) is a former Welsh cricketer who played for Glamorgan as a left-handed batsman and wicket-keeper between 1999 and 2016. He is currently the director of cricket at the county.

== Cricket career ==
=== Early years ===
Wallace made his second XI debut for Glamorgan at the age of just 15, and by 1998 he was in the England U-19 team that played Pakistan, as well as accompanying them to New Zealand the following winter and playing three one-day games against Australia U-19s in the summer of 1999, a year in which he won the NBC Denis Compton Award.

In September 1999, he made his bow in first-class cricket, appearing in the County Championship game against Somerset at the age of 17 years and 287 days – thus making him Glamorgan's youngest ever Championship wicket-keeper. Wallace took five catches in the match, and scored 28 from number nine in the first innings, and this was enough for him to keep his county place for the rest of the season. In an innings victory over Yorkshire, he made his first half-century: 64 not out, again batting at number nine.

After appearing in the Under-19 World Cup in the winter, Wallace played no first-team county cricket for the first half of the season, concentrating on his A-Levels, but in August was appointed captain of the U-19s for a one-day series against Sri Lanka, though was unable to take up his appointment because of an injury to his hand. He did, however, recover in time to replace the (also injured) Adrian Shaw for Glamorgan near the end of the season.

=== County regular ===
After another U-19 tour, this time to India, Wallace established himself during the 2001 season as his county's first-choice wicket-keeper, and was selected to visit Australia with the ECB National Academy squad, an honour he repeated the following winter. 2002 saw him make his maiden first-class century when he hit an unbeaten 106 in Glamorgan's pipe-opener against Derbyshire, albeit in a losing cause. Wallace finished 2002 with 61 dismissals in first-class and 27 in List A games, the latter helping his side to the Norwich Union League title.

The 2003 summer brought Wallace both his county cap and his greatest success with the bat, as he hit 856 first-class runs at 29.51 including 117 against Durham in August and 121 against the same opponents a month later; on the second occasion, Wallace opened the batting.

Wallace continued to be Glamorgan's first choice wicket-keeper in all forms of the game and captained the county for the first time against Somerset at Taunton on 30 August 2007. In 2008 Wallace was named the club's one-day player of the year and supporters player of the year with his most memorable performance being a match winning score of 48 off just 17 balls against Leicestershire in the Pro40 competition at Colwyn Bay.

In 2011 Wallace became the first Glamorgan wicket-keeper to ever score a thousand first-class runs in a season surpassing Jimmy Stone's record aggregate set in 1923 along the way.

Wallace is considered as Glamorgan's most successful wicket-keeper/batsman. He holds the record for the most first-class centuries by a Glamorgan wicket-keeper (15) with his highest score of 139 coming in the final game of the 2009 season against Surrey at the Oval. Wallace has 2 List A centuries coming in the 2012 and 2013 seasons. Having previously held the position of vice-captain he was appointed Glamorgan captain for the 2012 season.

=== Career best performances ===
	Batting			
	Score	Fixture	Venue	Season
FC	139	Glamorgan v Surrey	The Oval	2009
LA	118*	Glamorgan v Gloucestershire Gladiators	Cardiff	2013
T20	69*	Glamorgan v Warwickshire Bears	Rugby	2013

== Outside playing ==
He graduated from University of Staffordshire with a degree in Professional Sports Writing and Broadcasting in the summer of 2008 and studied for a master's degree at Cardiff Metropolitan University. He has written regularly on cricket and rugby in the Welsh press.

Having previously served as a players representative Wallace was elected as Chairman of the Professional Cricketers Association in 2013.

In 2019, Wallace was appointed as Glamorgan's director of cricket, succeeding Hugh Morris in the role.

Sporting positions
Preceded by Vikram Solanki	Chairman of the Professional Cricketers' Association; 2013–2017	Succeeded by Daryl Mitchell
Preceded by Hugh Morris	Glamorgan Director of Cricket; 2018 to date	Succeeded by Incumbent
