= Gordon Spiring =

English footballer

Personal information
- Full name: Gordon Spiring
- Date of birth: 25 August 1918
- Place of birth: Bristol, England
- Date of death: 1997 (aged 78–79)
- Position: Outside left

Senior career*
Years	Team	Apps	(Gls)
1938	Bristol City	4	(1)
- Glastonbury
- * Club domestic league appearances and goals

Gordon Spiring (25 August 1918 – 1997) was an English professional footballer who played in the Football League for Bristol City as an outside left.

== Personal life ==
Spiring served in the British Armed Forces during the Second World War.
