= Reuben Spiring =

English cricketer (born 1974)

Karl Reuben Spiring (born 13 November 1974 in Southport) is a retired English cricketer. He was a right-handed batsman and a right-arm off-break bowler. He played with Worcestershire from 1993 to 2000, and played one match for the England Under-19s in 1994.

Spiring was educated at Monmouth School. He studied at Durham University for one year, opting to leave in order to play cricket full time for Worcestershire. Spiring also played in the final of the Tetley Bitter Festival Trophy in 1996. He was awarded the NBC Denis Compton Award in 1997.

Reuben's father, Peter Spiring was a professional footballer for Bristol City, Liverpool, Luton Town and Hereford United.
