= Ali Bukhari =

Pakistani first-class cricketer

Syed Mohammad Ali Bukhari (born 8 November 1973 in Bahawalpur, Punjab, Pakistan) is a former first-class cricketer.

== Career ==
Bukhari was a left-arm fast-medium bowler who played for teams in both Pakistan and England. These teams included:

- Lahore City 1993/1994
- Railways 1993/1994
- Islamabad 1994/1995
- United Bank Limited 1994/1995
- Agriculture Development Bank of Pakistan 1995/1996
- Rawalpindi A 1995/1996
- Bahawalpur 1998/1999
- Wales Minor Counties 1999
- Derbyshire 2002/2004
- Herefordshire County Cricket Club 2005
- Middlesex
- Glamorgan County Cricket Club

Over-50s World Cup Cricket For Wales.

Bukhari made a good debut for Derbyshire in 2002, scoring 53 runs, whilst batting at number nine and taking several crucial wickets in an improbable Derbyshire victory. He took 47 wickets during his debut season, but a succession of injuries affected his progress. His haul of wickets fell to 28 in 2003 and 10 in 2004. He had a slingy left-arm bowling action. He was awarded a contract by Middlesex for 2006 following the granting of a British passport.

Pakistan's former Test wicket-keeper Taslim Arif was his uncle.

== Coaching ==
After his playing career ended Bukhari became a pace bowling coach.
