= Ryan Watkins =

Welsh cricketer (born 1983)

Personal information
- Full name: Ryan Watkins
- Born: 9 June 1983 (age 43); Abergavenny, Wales
- Nickname: Wokka
- Height: 6 ft 0 in (1.83 m)
- Batting: Left-handed
- Bowling: Right-arm medium
- Role: All-rounder

Domestic team information
- Years: Team
- 2003–2009: Glamorgan (squad no. 24)
- FC debut: 26 July 2005 Glamorgan v Bangladesh A
- LA debut: 6 September 2004 Glamorgan v Essex

Career statistics
Competition	FC	LA	T20
Matches	33	22	26
Runs scored	951	253	93
Batting average	18.28	16.86	9.30
100s/50s	0/2	0/0	0/0
Top score	87	39	18
Balls bowled	2,932	646	456
Wickets	39	16	31
Bowling average	49.41	43.81	19.45
5 wickets in innings	0	0	1
10 wickets in match	0	0	0
Best bowling	4/40	2/25	5/16
Catches/stumpings	18/–	2/–	8/–
- Source: ESPNcricinfo, 9 August 2009

Ryan Edward Watkins (born 9 June 1983) is a Welsh cricketer. He played for Glamorgan as a left-handed batsman and a right-arm medium-pace bowler.

As a teenager, he captained Gwent and Wales before signing a development contract with the Welsh County side.

Watkins made his debut in 2005 and contributed with both the bat and the ball during 2006, when he was consistently in the first XI.

In 2009, he became the first Glamorgan to take five wickets in a Twenty20 match when recording figures of 5/16 against Gloucestershire, but was released by the club at the end of that season.

After his cricket career, he worked as a policeman.
