= Tim Hancock =

English cricketer

Tim Hancock (born 20 April 1972) is a former English cricketer. He is a right-handed batsman and a right-arm medium-pace bowler.

Born in Reading, Hancock joined Gloucestershire in 1991, and has been at the club ever since. His bowling has added an extra effective dimension to his play. Between 2000 and 2002 he was vice-captain of the Gloucestershire team.

In 2005 Hancock only saw five appearances, in a year which saw Gloucestershire relegated into Division Two.

Tim Hancock retired at the end of the 2006 season and has now taken up the post of the Cricket Academy Director at South Gloucestershire and Stroud College in Bristol.
