= Mike Powell (Welsh cricketer) =

Welsh cricketer

Personal information
- Full name: Michael John Powell
- Born: 3 February 1977 (age 49); Abergavenny, Monmouthshire, Wales
- Nickname: Powelly
- Height: 6 ft 1 in (1.85 m)
- Batting: Right-handed
- Bowling: Right-arm off break
- Role: Middle-order batsman

Domestic team information
- Years: Team
- 1997–2011: Glamorgan (squad no. 14)
- 2005: MCC
- 2012–2013: Kent (squad no. 14)
- FC debut: 5 June 1997 Glamorgan v Oxford University
- Last FC: 29 May 2013 Kent v Leicestershire
- LA debut: 3 August 1997 Glamorgan v Nottinghamshire
- Last LA: 9 August 2009 Glamorgan v Northamptonshire

Career statistics
Competition	FC	LA	T20
Matches	236	204	44
Runs scored	13,421	4,665	844
Batting average	38.45	26.96	22.81
100s/50s	27/70	1/25	0/5
Top score	299	114*	68*
Balls bowled	164	24	–
Wickets	2	1	–
Bowling average	66.00	26.00	–
5 wickets in innings	0	0	–
10 wickets in match	0	0	–
Best bowling	2/39	1/26	–
Catches/stumpings	136/–	79/–	16/–
- Source: ESPNcricinfo, 26 July 2013

Michael John Powell (born 3 February 1977) is a Welsh retired cricketer. He is a right-handed batsman and a right-arm off-break bowler. Powell was born at Abergavenny in Monmouthshire. He became the third batsman for Glamorgan to score a century on debut in a first-class match.

Having signed and played for Glamorgan since 1996, his first accolades as a player there include the Glamorgan Young Player of the Year award in 1997 and 1999. His first appearances at Glamorgan came courtesy of the Second XI Championship in May 1996, and in the 1996 Bain Hogg trophy two weeks later. He played moderately in his first season in the first team of 1997, before making a name for himself in the league in 1998. Participating mostly in Division Two prior to 2001, his team were promoted to Division One in 2002, having performed well at the end of the 2001 season, giving his team hope to progress further in the league.

Next year, Glamorgan finished top of the points table in Division One, before failing in 2003. However his performances have remained steady since then, keeping his team in the top division until 2005, when the team dropped after winning one of 16 one-day game. Powell still scored above 1,000 runs, but was the team's second best run scorer after David Hemp. In 2006, Powell passed the 1,000-run mark after 11 games, scoring 299 against Essex but falling 10 runs short of Steve James' county record of 309. In 2007 after a successful operation to remove a rib Powell asked for, and was granted, permission to bury it beneath Sophia Gardens.

After claiming to being held back at Glamorgan, Powell signed a two-year deal at Kent County Cricket Club, starting in 2012.

He retired from cricket after the 2013 season and took up a position with the Welsh risk consultancy firm Thomas Carroll PLC.

Mike's uncle, Michael Powell, played cricket for Worcestershire Second XI in 1973 and Glamorgan Second XI in 1974 and 1975.

== Career best performances ==
	Batting				Bowling (innings)			
	Score	Fixture	Venue	Season	Figures	Fixture	Venue	Season
FC	299	Glamorgan v Gloucestershire	Cheltenham	2006	2/39	Glamorgan v Oxford University	Oxford	1999
LA	114 not out	Glamorgan Dragons v Hampshire Hawks	Cardiff	2008	1/26	Glamorgan v Lincolnshire	Lincoln	2004
T20	68 not out	Glamorgan Dragons v Somerset Sabres	Cardiff	2005	-			
