= Mike O'Shea (cricketer) =

Welsh cricketer

Personal information
- Full name: Michael Peter O'Shea
- Born: 4 September 1987 (age 39); Barry, Glamorgan, Wales
- Nickname: Rik
- Height: 5 ft 11 in (1.80 m)
- Batting: Right-handed
- Bowling: Right-arm medium-fast
- Role: Middle-order batsman

Domestic team information
- Years: Team
- 2005: Wales Minor Counties
- 2005–2009: Glamorgan (squad no. 30)
- 2010: Unicorns (squad no. 15)
- 2011–2012: Glamorgan (squad no. 13)
- FC debut: 26 July 2005 Glamorgan v Bangladesh A
- LA debut: 4 May 2005 Wales Minor Counties v Nottinghamshire

Career statistics
Competition	FC	LA	T20
Matches	6	27	4
Runs scored	137	559	23
Batting average	15.22	25.40	7.66
100s/50s	0/1	0/3	0/0
Top score	50	90	11
Balls bowled	–	518	48
Wickets	–	10	1
Bowling average	–	52.10	50.00
5 wickets in innings	–	0	0
10 wickets in match	–	0	0
Best bowling	–	2/32	1/25
Catches/stumpings	1/–	7/–	1/–
- Source: Cricinfo, 31 March 2013

Michael Peter O'Shea (born 4 September 1987) is a Welsh cricketer who has played for Glamorgan and Unicorns. He is a right-handed batsman and a right-arm medium-fast bowler.

He toured India in early 2005 with the England Under-19s, playing three youth Tests and four youth One Day Internationals. O'Shea made his debut in senior cricket in 2005, representing Wales Minor Counties in a Cheltenham & Gloucester Trophy match against Nottinghamshire, being dismissed for a golden duck. He made three first-class appearances for Glamorgan later that season, before travelling to Bangladesh to represent England Under-19s in a tri-series against Bangladesh and Sri Lanka.

In 2010, O'Shea was selected as one of 21 players to form the first Unicorns squad to take part in the Clydesdale Bank 40 domestic limited overs competition against the regular first-class counties. The Unicorns were made up of 15 former county cricket professionals and 6 young cricketers looking to make it in the professional game.
