= Ian Thomas (cricketer) =

Welsh cricketer

Ian James Thomas (born 9 May 1979) is a Welsh cricketer who played for Glamorgan as a left-handed opening batsman from 1999 to 2005. Thomas, along with Graeme Hick, held the record for highest score in the Twenty20 Cup from 2004 to 2006, after scoring 116 not out to lead Glamorgan to a win with three balls to spare against Somerset Sabres in the group stages of the 2004 tournament.

Thomas was born in Newport, Monmouthshire. On his County Championship debut in 2000, Thomas made 82 in a drawn match against Essex, described by the BBC reporter as a "dream debut". It was to be his highest score in first class cricket, and he only made two higher scores in any form of the game, the aforementioned Twenty20 century and 93 against a Durham Cricket Board XI in the C&G Trophy.

After the 2005 season, where Thomas' highest first class cricket score was 42, he was released from the club, and currently plays some minor cricket for Herefordshire. He has also represented Wales Minor Counties.

Thomas played for Port Talbot Town in the South Wales Cricket Association between 2007 and 2008. In 30 matches, he scored 1295 runs at an average of 46.25, making three centuries with a highest score of 133. He also took 42 wickets at 29.83 with a best of 5/57. During his period at the club, Thomas formed a formidable opening partnership with his former Glamorgan county colleague Dan Cherry. He left at the end of the 2008 season to play for Newport in the South Wales Cricket League.
