= Adrian Shaw (cricketer) =

Welsh cricketer

Personal information
- Full name: Adrian David Shaw
- Born: 17 February 1972 (age 54); Neath, Glamorgan, Wales
- Batting: Right-handed
- Role: Wicket-keeper

Domestic team information
- Years: Team
- 1994–2003: Glamorgan
- 1990–2005: Wales Minor Counties

Career statistics
Competition	First-class	List A
Matches	77	85
Runs scored	1,906	759
Batting average	21.90	15.48
100s/50s	1/9	–/–
Top score	140	48
Balls bowled	6	–
Wickets	–	–
Bowling average	–	–
5 wickets in innings	–	–
10 wickets in match	–	–
Best bowling	–	–
Catches/stumpings	180/14	59/17
- Source: Cricinfo, 27 July 2012

Adrian Shaw (born 17 February 1972) is a first-class and List A cricketer who played for Glamorgan. He was a right-handed batsman and a wicket-keeper, who played with the Glamorgan senior team for thirteen years. Having become the second-team wicketkeeper in 1987, he played with England under-19s as a wicket-keeper with superior batting ability to his colleague Colin Metson.

Previously a rugby player for Neath RFC, he helped Glamorgan to the 1997 County Championship, and in 1999, he hit a career best score of 140, before a groin injury caused him to miss the majority of the 2000 season. Once again, however, after returning from injury, he excelled, managing to catch Brian Lara when the West Indies visited.

He lost his place in the First XI in 2001, before making progress in the Second XI in 2002 and being appointed the Second XI captain. He has most recently been present in the Second XI during the 2006 season, bringing his career full-circle, having begun his second XI tenure nearly eighteen years previously.
