= David Leatherdale =

English cricketer

David Antony Leatherdale (born 26 November 1967 in Bradford, Yorkshire) is a former English cricketer. He played county cricket for Worcestershire.

In a career stretching over 17 years with Worcestershire, he has scored more than 10,000 first-class runs at a batting average of slightly under 33, and his straightforward medium-pacers have brought him more than 130 wickets, with over another 170 in the one-day game.

Although he made his first-class debut in 1988, Leatherdale did not receive his county cap for another six years. He has reached 1000 first-class runs in a season just once, in 1998 when he made 1001.

He was awarded a benefit by Worcestershire in 2003, and retired from first-class cricket at the end of that season, although he continued to play one-day cricket and was unexpectedly called up for the County Championship game against Derbyshire in April 2005. He finally called time on his long playing career in December of that year to concentrate on a full-time job as commercial director of the county.
