= Andrew McGarry =

English cricketer (born 1981)

Personal information
- Full name: Andrew Charles McGarry
- Born: 8 November 1981 (age 45); Basildon, Essex, England
- Batting: Right-handed
- Bowling: Right-arm fast-medium

Domestic team information
- Years: Team
- 1999–2007: Essex
- 2004–2008: Suffolk
- 2011–2012: Bedfordshire

Career statistics
Competition	First-class	List A
Matches	19	19
Runs scored	43	2
Batting average	7.16	0.66
100s/50s	–/–	–/–
Top score	11*	1
Balls bowled	2,403	591
Wickets	29	12
Bowling average	53.31	45.50
5 wickets in innings	1	–
10 wickets in match	–	–
Best bowling	5/27	2/20
Catches/stumpings	4/–	2/–
- Source: Cricinfo, 11 July 2022

Andrew Charles McGarry (born 8 November 1981) is an English former cricketer. Born in Basildon, he was a right-handed batsman and a right-arm fast-medium bowler. During his career in First Class and List A cricket he played for Essex and Suffolk.

After a debut performance in the Sri Lanka A tour in July 1999, he waited a year before another first-class appearance, waiting until the 2000 County Championship before a debut against Worcestershire in which he was caught-and-bowled off the bowling of Vikram Solanki, and took five wickets in total with his bowling.

For the second half of the 2004 season until the end of the 2006 season McGarry played for Suffolk in the Minor Counties Championship. Due to a run of injuries in the Essex squad, he was re-signed for the 2007 season, but having played just a handful of games, suffered a broken hand, and was again released at the end of the season. He, once again, played for Suffolk during the 2008 season.

In 2017 he was appointed head coach of Old Southendian & Southchurch Cricket Club.
