= Jonathan Hughes (cricketer) =

Welsh cricketer (born 1981)

Jonathan Hughes (born 30 June 1981, in Pontypridd) is a Welsh cricketer. He is a right-handed batsman and a right-arm medium-pace bowler who played 42 first class matches for Glamorgan between 2001 and 2005. He made three first class hundreds.
