= Andrew Davies (cricketer, born 1976) =

Welsh cricketer

Personal information
- Full name: Andrew Philip Davies
- Born: November 7, 1976 (age 50); Neath, Glamorgan, Wales
- Batting: Left-handed
- Bowling: Right-arm medium pace
- Role: Bowler

Domestic team information
- Years: Team
- 1995–2007: Glamorgan

Career statistics
Competition	FC	LA	T20
Matches	41	108	24
Runs scored	707	330	23
Batting average	17.24	12.69	4.60
100s/50s	0/1	0/0	0/0
Top score	54	27	11
Balls bowled	5,496	4,716	516
Wickets	77	147	27
Bowling average	44.15	28.04	26.00
5 wickets in innings	1	2	0
10 wickets in match	0	–	–
Best bowling	5/79	5/19	3/17
Catches/stumpings	11/–	13/–	5/–
- Source: CricketArchive, 21 December 2025

Andrew Davies (born 7 November 1976) is a Welsh cricketer. He is a left-handed batsman and a right-arm medium-pace bowler.

Davies was born in Neath and attended Dwyr-Y-Felin high school from 1988 to 1993. Andrew joined Christ College Brecon from 1993 to 1995 and boarded at School House Red. Davies played first team football, rugby and rugby sevens playing in the championship winning 7's team of 1994/95 under coach Jon Williams. Andrew captained the cricket team coached by Colin Kleiser.

Davies made his Championship debut in 1995, and, despite having an early career full of injury, he continued to play through limited overs cricket. In the 2001 Norwich Union League, he became Glamorgan's leading wicket taker, with 21 wickets at a 14.33 average. Davies received his Glamorgan county cap in June 2007.

Davies retired after the 2007 season to take up a position with a stockbroking company.

Davies resides in South Wales with his family.
