= Jimmy Ormond =

English cricketer (born 1977)

James Ormond
Personal information
- Born: 20 August 1977 (age 49); Coventry, England
- Height: 181 cm (5 ft 11 in)
- Batting: Right-handed
- Bowling: Right-arm medium-fast; Right-arm offbreak
- Role: Bowler

International information
- National side: England
- Test debut: 23 August 2001 v Australia
- Last Test: 3 December 2001 v India

Career statistics
Competition	Test	First-class
Matches	2	137
Runs scored	38	1,911
Batting average	12.66	15.16
100s/50s	0/0	0/3
Top score	18	64*
Balls bowled	372	25,040
Wickets	2	448
Bowling average	92.50	30.08
5 wickets in innings	0	20
10 wickets in match	0	1
Best bowling	1/70	7/63
Catches/stumpings	0/–	31/–
- Source: Cricinfo, 6 November 2022

James Ormond (born 20 August 1977) is an English former cricketer. He played two Test matches for the England cricket team and in total made 137 first-class appearances. Ormond was a right-handed batsman and a right-arm medium-fast bowler although he has also bowled off-spin in his second and final Test match against India in Mohali.

== Career ==
Ormond started playing cricket for Corley Cricket Club in the Warwickshire cricket league. Ormond made his first-class debut in 1995 for Leicestershire County Cricket Club and played a part in the successful championship seasons of 1996 and 1998. Ormond had several consistent seasons at Leicestershire which saw him get rewarded with representation for England at Under-19 level and places on England A tours of Kenya and Sri Lanka.

Ormond eventually made his full Test debut against Australia in 2001. He was then picked for the tour of India where he played his second and final Test match. His two Test wickets were Ricky Ponting and Rahul Dravid.

After he returned to England he moved from Leicestershire to Surrey, where he won another County Championship title in his first season. He remained at the club until the end of the 2009 season when he was released. He is presently cricket coach at Stockport Grammar School.

Ormond was involved in a notable piece of sledging; when, in a Test match against Australia in 2001, Mark Waugh asked him, "Mate, what are you doing out here? There's no way you're good enough to play for England." Ormond replied "Maybe not, but at least I'm the best player in my own family", a reference to Waugh's brother Steve, who was the captain of the Australian team.

Ormond was criticised for being overweight while an England player.
