= Dean Cosker =

English cricketer (born 1978)

Personal information
- Full name: Dean Andrew Cosker
- Born: 7 January 1978 (age 48); Weymouth, Dorset, England
- Nickname: Lurks
- Height: 5 ft 11 in (1.80 m)
- Batting: Right-handed
- Bowling: Slow left-arm orthodox
- Role: Bowler

Domestic team information
- Years: Team
- 1996–2016: Glamorgan (squad no. 23)
- FC debut: 25 July 1996 Glamorgan v Lancashire
- Last FC: 19 July 2015 Glamorgan v Lancashire
- LA debut: 11 August 1996 Glamorgan v Leicestershire
- Last LA: 14 June 2016 Glamorgan v Middlesex

Career statistics
Competition	FC	LA	T20
Matches	248	252	128
Runs scored	3,444	827	173
Batting average	14.78	10.88	15.72
100s/50s	0/2	0/1	0/0
Top score	69	50*	21*
Balls bowled	45,348	10,580	2,334
Wickets	597	260	100
Bowling average	36.31	32.81	30.32
5 wickets in innings	12	1	0
10 wickets in match	1	0	0
Best bowling	6/91	5/54	4/25
Catches/stumpings	150/–	91/–	38/–
- Source: CricketArchive, 18 August 2016

Dean Andrew Cosker (born 7 January 1978) is an English cricket referee and former cricketer. He is a right-handed batsman and a left-arm slow bowler who played for Glamorgan. He has played in first-class, List A and Twenty20 cricket. He attended Millfield School in Somerset between 1991 and 1996.

He made his first-class debut in 1996 against Lancashire at Cardiff taking 6 wickets in the match. Soon after Cosker toured with England Under-19 cricket team in their tour of Pakistan.

In 1997 he was given a longer run in the Glamorgan side as Robert Croft was playing for England. Cosker spent the next couple of winters touring with the England A squad to East Africa, Sri Lanka, South Africa and Zimbabwe.

Cosker won his county cap in 2000 and became a key member of Glamorgan's highly successful one-day team between 2000 and 2005, where his accurate bowling, often in tandem with Robert Croft, and fielding backward of square on the off side were key to Glamorgan's success.

In September 2013, as new contract negotiations stalled, Cosker claimed his 500th first-class wicket for Glamorgan.

In August 2016 Cosker announced his retirement from cricket. In 2017 he was appointed by the England and Wales Cricket Board as a cricket liaison officer.

== Career best performances ==
as of 18 August 2016

	Batting				Bowling			
	Score	Fixture	Venue	Season	Score	Fixture	Venue	Season
FC	69	Glamorgan v Kent	Canterbury	2015	6/91	Glamorgan v Essex	Cardiff	2009
LA	50*	Glamorgan Dragons v Northamptonshire Steelbacks	Northampton	2010	5/54	Glamorgan v Essex	Chelmsford	2003
T20	21*	Glamorgan Dragons v Somerset	Taunton	2011	4/25	Glamorgan Dragons v Surrey	Cardiff	2015
