= Darren Thomas =

Welsh cricketer

Personal information
- Full name: Stuart Darren Thomas
- Born: 25 January 1972 (age 54); Swansea, Glamorgan, Wales
- Nickname: Ted
- Height: 6 ft 0 in (1.83 m)
- Batting: Left-handed
- Bowling: Right-arm fast-medium

Domestic team information
- Years: Team
- 1992–2006: Glamorgan
- 2011: Wales Minor Counties

Career statistics
Competition	FC	LA	T20
Matches	169	140	14
Runs scored	3,977	1,273	169
Batting average	20.93	16.53	16.90
100s/50s	2/18	0/1	0/0
Top score	138	71*	43*
Balls bowled	26,518	5,384	234
Wickets	504	171	11
Bowling average	31.79	27.29	35.81
5 wickets in innings	18	3	0
10 wickets in match	1	0	0
Best bowling	8/50	7/16	3/32
Catches/stumpings	56/–	25/–	2/–
- Source: Cricinfo, 13 June 2012

Stuart Darren Thomas (born 25 January 1975) is a Welsh former cricketer. He is a left-handed batsman and a right-arm medium-pace bowler.

Having first achieved notability taking a five-wicket haul against Derbyshire at the age of 17, Thomas took his chance at a place in the England youth team, and continued to bowl well through to 1995, at which point he suffered a dip in form which lasted until he regained his form in 1998, finishing top of the wicket-taking stakes with 81 wickets at an average of 24. He bowled an innings of 7 for 16, a record for Glamorgan, and was offered a chance to play for England A against South Africa and Zimbabwe.

Thomas was part of the Glamorgan side which won the county's first County Championship in 28 years in 1997, taking 44 wickets at 26.36, including 5 for 38 in the fixture against Somerset which clinched the title.

He became the leading wicket taker in 2000 and recorded his first ten-wicket haul in a match against Durham in 2002.

In 2007, after fifteen years with Glamorgan, he joined Essex County Cricket Club. However, a shoulder injury sustained in February of that year prevented his playing even once for the first team, and in September he announced his retirement.

In April 2024, Thomas was appointed as head coach of the Jersey women's cricket team.
