= List of Glamorgan County Cricket Club players =

This is a list in alphabetical order of cricketers who have played for Glamorgan County Cricket Club in top-class matches since 1921 when the club joined the County Championship and the team was elevated to official first-class status. Glamorgan has been classified as a List A team since the beginning of limited overs cricket in 1963; and as a first-class Twenty20 team since the inauguration of the Twenty20 Cup in 2003.

The details are the player's usual name followed by the years in which he was active as a Glamorgan player and then his name is given as it usually appears on match scorecards. Note that many players represented other top-class teams besides Glamorgan and that some played for the club in minor counties cricket before 1921. Current players are shown as active to the latest season in which they played for the club. The list excludes Second XI and other players who did not play for the club's first team; and players whose first team appearances were in minor matches only. The list has been updated to the end of the 2025 cricket season.

As of 26 September 2025

== A ==
- Tom Abel (1922–1925): TE Abel
- Jim Allenby (2009–2014): J Allenby
- Tony Allin (1976): AW Allin
- Reg Anderson (1946): RMB Anderson
- Hamish Anthony (1990–1995): HAG Anthony
- Greg Armstrong (1974–1976): GD Armstrong
- Trevor Arnott (1921–1930): T Arnott
- Chris Ashling (2009–2011): CP Ashling

== B ==
- Andrew Balbirnie (2020–2021): A Balbirnie
- Jack Bancroft (1922): J Bancroft
- Steve Barwick (1981–1996): SR Barwick
- Simon Base (1986–1987): SJ Base
- Shoaib Bashir (2025): S Bashir
- Steve Bastien (1989–1993): S Bastien
- William Bates (1921–1931): WE Bates
- Herbie Baxter (1921): HW Baxter
- John Bell (1924–1931): JT Bell
- Tom Bevan (2022–2025): TR Bevan
- Jamie Bishop (1992): J Bishop
- David Blackmore (1934): D Blackmore
- Ronnie Boon (1931–1932): RW Boon
- Elvyn Bowen (1928–1933): E Bowen
- Will Bragg (2006–2017): WD Bragg
- Pat Brain (1921–1928): JHP Brain
- Michael Brain (1930): MB Brain
- Kraigg Brathwaite (2019): KC Brathwaite
- Tom Brierley (1931–1939): TL Brierley
- Connor Brown (2017–2019): CR Brown
- David Brown (2010–2011): DO Brown
- Kieran Bull (2014–2020): KA Bull
- Tolly Burnett (1958): AC Burnett
- Joe Burns (2018): JA Burns
- Alan Butcher (1987–1992): AR Butcher
- Gary Butcher (1994–1998): GP Butcher
- Eddie Byrom (2022–2025): EJ Byrom

== C ==
- Mike Cann (1986–1991): MJ Cann
- Lukas Carey (2016–2021): LJ Carey
- Ernie Carless (1934–1946): EF Carless
- Kiran Carlson (2016–2025): KS Carlson
- Harry Carr (1934): HL Carr
- Andy Carter (2015): A Carter
- Tom Cartwright (1977): TW Cartwright
- John Chandless (1927): J Chandless
- Dan Cherry (1998–2007): DD Cherry
- Frank Clarke (1956–1960): F Clarke
- Johnnie Clay (1921–1949): JC Clay
- Phil Clift (1937–1955): PB Clift
- Stephen Cook (2018): SC Cook
- Chris Cooke (2011–2025): CB Cooke
- Joe Cooke (2020–2022): JM Cooke
- Edgar Cooper (1921): E Cooper
- Jack Cope (1935): JJ Cope
- George Cording (1921–1923): GE Cording
- Tony Cordle (1963–1982): EA Cordle
- Mark Cosgrove (2006–2011): MJ Cosgrove
- Dean Cosker (1996–2016): DA Cosker
- Tony Cottey (1986–1998): PA Cottey
- Chris Cowdrey (1992): CS Cowdrey
- Nigel Cowley (1990): NGC Cowley
- Mason Crane (2024–2025): MS Crane
- Arthur Creber (1929): AB Creber
- Harry Creber (1898–1922): H Creber
- Robert Croft (1989–2012): RDB Croft
- Peter Crowther (1977–1978): PG Crowther
- Tom Cullen (2017–2022): TN Cullen

== D ==
- Adrian Dale (1989–2004): A Dale
- Jamie Dalrymple (2008–2010): JWM Dalrymple
- Alastair Dalton (1994–1996): AJ Dalton
- Guy Daly (1938): GN Daly
- Simon Daniels (1981–1982): SAB Daniels
- Gilbert Dauncey (1957): JG Dauncey
- Rodney David (1925–1929): RFA David
- Andrew Davies (1995–2007): AP Davies
- Aubrey Davies (1934–1938): DA Davies
- Dai Davies (1923–1939): D Davies
- Emrys Davies (1924–1954): DE Davies
- Roy Davies (1950): DR Davies
- Gwynfor Davies (1932): G Davies
- Gwyn Davies (1947–1948): GL Davies
- Hugh Davies (1955–1960): HD Davies
- Haydn Davies (1935–1958): HG Davies
- John Davies (1952): JA Davies
- Mark Davies (1990): M Davies
- Kim Davies (1975–1976): MK Davies
- Mark Davies (1982): MN Davies
- Clive Davies (1971–1972): TC Davies
- Terry Davies (1979–1986): T Davies
- Bill Davies (1932–1935): WDE Davies
- Billy Davies (1954–1960): WG Davies
- Bill Davies (1922–1927): WH Davies
- Bryan Davis (1968–1970): BA Davis
- John Davis (1959–1970): FJ Davis
- Roger Davis (1964–1976): RC Davis
- Winston Davis (1982–1984): WW Davis
- Ismail Dawood (1998–1999): I Dawood
- Marchant de Lange (2017–2020): M de Lange
- Simon Dennis (1989–1991): SJ Dennis
- John Derrick (1983–1991): J Derrick
- Louis Devereux (1956–1960): LN Devereux
- Harold Dickinson (1934–1935): HJ Dickinson
- Mark Dobson (1992): MC Dobson
- Aneurin Donald (2014–2018): AHT Donald
- Dan Douthwaite (2019–2025): DA Douthwaite
- Dick Duckfield (1930–1938): RG Duckfield
- Bob Dudley-Jones (1972–1974): RDL Dudley–Jones
- Tony Duncan (1934): AA Duncan
- Arnold Dyson (1926–1948): AH Dyson

== E ==
- Jim Eaglestone (1948–1949): JT Eaglestone
- Brian Edrich (1954–1956): BR Edrich
- Aubrey Edwards (1947): AME Edwards
- Gareth Edwards (1997): GJM Edwards
- Matthew Elliott (2000–2007): MTG Elliott
- Geoff Ellis (1970–1976): GP Ellis
- Bill Emery (1922): W Emery
- Alun Evans (1996–2002): AW Evans
- David Evans (1956–1969): DGL Evans
- Gwynn Evans (1939): G Evans
- Herbie Evans (1922): HP Evans
- Brian Evans (1958–1963): JB Evans
- Talfryn Evans (1934): T Evans
- Trevor Every (1929–1934): T Every

== F ==
- Fakhar Zaman (2019): Fakhar Zaman
- Norman Featherstone (1980–1981): NG Featherstone
- Asitha Fernando (2025): AM Fernando
- Cam Fletcher (2023): CD Fletcher
- Daren Foster (1991–1992): DJ Foster
- Arthur Francis (1973–1984): DA Francis
- Kenny Francis (1973): KMV Francis
- Romano Franco (2025): RCM Franco (Note: Franco made his List A debut in August 2025 against Hampshire. He had previously played for Wales National Counties, the Glamorgan Second XI and the Glamorgan Academy.)
- James Franklin (2006): JEC Franklin
- Roy Fredericks (1971–1973): RC Fredericks
- Albert Freethy (1921): AE Freethy
- Mark Frost (1990–1993): M Frost

== G ==
- Royston Gabe-Jones (1922): AR Gabe–Jones
- Sourav Ganguly (2005): SC Ganguly
- Peter Gatehouse (1957–1962): PW Gatehouse
- Fred Geary (1923): FW Geary
- William Gemmill (1921–1926): WN Gemmill
- Herschelle Gibbs (2008–2009): HH Gibbs
- Ottis Gibson (1994–1996): OD Gibson
- Jason Gillespie (2008): JN Gillespie
- Ted Glover (1932–1938): ERK Glover
- John Glover (2011–2014): JC Glover
- Dennis Good (1947): DC Good
- Murray Goodwin (2013–2014): MW Goodwin
- Andy Gorvin (2021–2025): AW Gorvin
- Richard Grant (2004–2008): RN Grant
- Russell Green (1984): RC Green
- Hugh Griffiths, Baron Griffiths (1946–1948): WH Griffiths
- David Gwynne (1922–1923): DGP Gwynne

== H ==
- Stamford Hacker (1921–1923): WS Hacker
- Robert Hadley (1971): RJ Hadley
- Bob Haines (1933–1934): CVG Haines
- Alwyn Harris (1960–1964): A Harris
- George Harris (1932): GJ Harris
- James Harris (2007–2025): JAR Harris
- Leslie Harris (1947): LJ Harris
- Ernie Harris (1938–1947): WE Harris
- Adam Harrison (2002–2007): AJ Harrison
- David Harrison (1999–2010): DS Harrison
- George Harrison (1924–1925): GB Harrison
- Stuart Harrison (1971–1977): SC Harrison
- Peter Hatzoglou (2023): P Hatzoglou
- Bernard Hedges (1950–1967): B Hedges
- Tom Helm (2014): TG Helm
- David Hemp (1991–2008): DL Hemp
- Charlie Hemphrey (2019–2020): CR Hemphrey
- Steve Henderson (1983–1985): SP Henderson
- Moisés Henriques (2012): MC Henriques
- Norman Hever (1948–1954): NG Hever
- Denis Hickey (1986): DJ Hickey
- Len Hill (1964–1976): LW Hill
- Mervyn Hill (1923): ML Hill
- Rupert Hill (1975): RK Hill
- Joe Hills (1926–1931): JJ Hills
- John Hinwood (1923): JWJ Hinwood
- Robin Hobbs (1979–1981): RNS Hobbs
- Bert Hodges (1936): AE Hodges
- Michael Hogan (2013–2022): MG Hogan
- Geoff Holmes (1978–1991): GC Holmes
- John Hopkins (1970–1988): JA Hopkins
- Dick Horsfall (1956): R Horsfall
- Alex Horton (2022–2025): AJ Horton
- Alan Howard (1928–1933): AR Howard
- Wilf Hughes (1934–1938): DW Hughes
- Gwyn Hughes (1962–1964): G Hughes
- Jonathan Hughes (2001–2005) : J Hughes
- Henry Hurle (2024–2025): HE Hurle (Note: Hurle made his List A debut in August 2024 against Glamorgan. He had previously played for Wales National Counties, the Glamorgan Second XI and the Glamorgan Academy.)

== I ==
- Imad Wasim (2025): Imad Wasim
- Colin Ingram (2015–2025): CA Ingram

== J ==
- Norman Jacob (1922): NE Jacob
- David James (1948): DH James
- Edward James (1922): EH James
- Evan James (1946–1947): EL James
- Nick James (2009–2013): NA James
- Steve James (1985–2003): SP James
- Hal Jarrett (1938): HH Jarrett
- Keith Jarrett (1967): KS Jarrett
- Javed Miandad (1980–1985): Javed Miandad
- Huw Jenkins (1970): H Jenkins
- Vivian Jenkins (1931–1937): VGJ Jenkins
- Leslie Jenkins (1921): WLT Jenkins
- Jack Johns (1922): J Johns
- Alan Jones (1957–1983): A Jones
- Allan Jones (1980–1981): AA Jones
- Andrew Jones (1993): AJ Jones
- Alex Jones (2010–2013): AJ Jones
- Alan Lewis Jones (1973–1986): AL Jones
- David Jones (1938): DA Jones
- Closs Jones (1934–1946) : EC Jones
- Edward Jones (1926) : EC Jones (Note: Jones played a single match for the county in 1926, although he did not bat or bowl during the game. Born at Cardiff in 1896, Jones played club cricket in the city and worked as a police officer. He died in the city in 1978.)
- Eifion Jones (1960–1983): EW Jones
- Harry Jones (1946): HO Jones
- Jeff Jones (1960–1968): IJ Jones
- James Jones (1928–1929): JM Jones
- Simon Jones (1998–2013): SP Jones
- Tom Jones (1925–1928): TC Jones
- Wilf Jones (1929–1933): WE Jones
- William Jones (1933–1938): WM Jones
- Wat Jones (1946–1947): WE Jones
- Willie Jones (1937–1958): WE Jones
- Arthur Joseph (1946): AF Joseph
- Peter Judge (1939–1947): PF Judge

== K ==
- Jacques Kallis (1999): JH Kallis
- Michael Kasprowicz (2002–2004): MS Kasprowicz
- Ben Kellaway (2023–2025): BI Kellaway
- Neil Kendrick (1994/95–1996): NM Kendrick
- Hayden Kerr (2025): HL Kerr
- James Kettleborough (2015–2016): JM Kettleborough
- Usman Khawaja (2018): UT Khawaja
- Collis King (1977): CL King
- Graham Kingston (1967–1971): GC Kingston
- Sam Kirnon (1991–1992): S Kirnon
- Garnett Kruger (2009): GJP Kruger
- Matthew Kuhnemann (2025): MP Kuhnemann

== L ==
- Marnus Labuschagne (2019–2025): M Labuschagne
- Tom Lancefield (2014): TJ Lancefield
- George Lavis (1928–1949): G Lavis
- Wayne Law (1997–2000): WL Law
- Jeremy Lawlor (2015–2019): JL Lawlor
- Peter Lawlor (1981): PJ Lawlor
- Roland Lefebvre (1993–1995): RP Lefebvre
- Ned Leonard (2024–2025): EO Leonard
- Tony Lewis (1955–1974): AR Lewis
- Brian Lewis (1965–1969): B Lewis
- David Lewis (1960–1969): DW Lewis
- Euros Lewis (1961–1966): EJ Lewis
- Ken Lewis (1950–1956): KH Lewis
- Mick Lewis (2004): ML Lewis
- Anthony Ling (1934–1936): AJP Ling
- Jeff Linton (1932): JEF Linton
- Mike Llewellyn (1970–1982): MJ Llewellyn
- Barry Lloyd (1972–1984): BJ Lloyd
- David Lloyd (2012–2023): DL Lloyd
- Kevin Lyons (1967–1977): KJ Lyons

== M ==
- Andy Mack (1978–1980): AJ Mack
- John Madden-Gaskell (1922): JCP Madden
- Jimmy Maher (2001–2007): JP Maher
- Majid Khan (1968–1976): Majid Khan
- Steve Malone (1985): SJ Malone
- Shaun Marsh (2012–2019): SE Marsh
- William Marsh (1947): WE Marsh
- George Martin (1921): EG Martin
- Fred Mathias (1922–1930): FW Mathias
- Austin Matthews (1937–1947): ADG Matthews
- Matthew Maynard (1985–2005): MP Maynard
- Tom Maynard (2007–2010): TL Maynard
- Jim McConnon (1950–1961): JE McConnon
- Brendon McCullum (2006): BB McCullum
- Nathan McCullum (2013): NL McCullum
- Les McFarlane (1985): LL McFarlane
- Jamie McIlroy (2021–2025): JP McIlroy
- Frank Meggitt (1923): FC Meggitt
- Jack Mercer (1922–1939): J Mercer
- Craig Meschede (2015–2019): CAJ Meschede
- Colin Metson (1987–1997): CP Metson
- Craig Miles (2024): CN Miles
- David Miller (2017): DA Miller
- Hamish Miller (1963–1966): HDS Miller
- Mir Hamza (2024): Mir Hamza
- Steve Monkhouse (1987–1988): S Monkhouse
- Stan Montgomery (1949–1953): SW Montgomery
- Niel Morgan (1928–1929): AN Morgan
- Owen Morgan (2016–2020): AO Morgan
- Noel Morgan (1934): EN Morgan
- Howard Morgan (1958): HW Morgan
- Trevil Morgan (1925–1934): JT Morgan
- Tom Morgan (1921–1925): TR Morgan
- Guy Morgan (1925–1938): WG Morgan
- Percy Morgan (1925): WP Morgan
- Ben Morris (2023–2025): BJ Morris
- Hugh Morris (1981–1997): H Morris
- Ian Morris (1966–1968): I Morris
- Vernon Morris (1921–1929): VL Morris
- Percy Morris (1921–1925): WP Morris
- Ezra Moseley (1980–1986): EA Moseley
- Ernie Moss (1923): SE Moss
- Len Muncer (1947–1954): BL Muncer
- Jack Murphy (2017–2018): JR Murphy

== N ==
- Jack Nash (1921–1922): A Nash
- Malcolm Nash (1966–1983): MA Nash
- Ricky Needham (1975): PJE Needham
- Michael Neser (2021–2023): MG Neser
- Keith Newell (1999–2002): K Newell
- Aneurin Norman (2011–2012): AJ Norman
- Kim Norkett (1974): KT Norkett
- Marcus North (2012–2013): MJ North
- Phil North (1985–1989): PD North
- Sam Northeast (2022–2025): SA Northeast
- Tom Norton (2025): TO Norton

== O ==
- Arthur O'Bree (1921–1923): A O'Bree
- Rodney Ontong (1975–1989): RC Ontong
- Mike O'Shea (2005–2012): MP O'Shea
- Will Owen (2007–2015): WT Owen

== P ==
- Richard Parkhouse (1939): RJ Parkhouse
- Gilbert Parkhouse (1948–1964): WGA Parkhouse
- Owen Parkin (1994–2003): OT Parkin
- Wayne Parnell (2015): WD Parnell
- Parvez Mir (1979): Parvez Mir
- Ajaz Patel (2022): AY Patel
- Samit Patel (2019): SR Patel
- Duncan Pauline (1986): DB Pauline
- Sam Pearce (2021): SJ Pearce
- Cecil Pearson (1922): CJH Pearson
- Nicky Peng (2006–2007): N Peng
- Dewi Penrhyn Jones (2015): D Penrhyn Jones
- Bertie Perkins (1925–1933): ALB Perkins
- Neil Perry (1979–1981): NJ Perry
- Alviro Petersen (2011): AN Petersen
- Stuart Phelps (1993–1994): BS Phelps
- Frank Pinch (1921–1926): FB Pinch
- Len Pitchford (1935): L Pitchford
- Jim Pleass (1947–1956): JE Pleass
- Harry Podmore (2016–2024): HW Podmore
- Robert Pook (1990): NR Pook
- Arthur Porter (1936–1949): A Porter
- Mike Powell (1997–2011): MJ Powell
- Tyrone Powell (1976): TL Powell
- Trevor Preece (1923): T Preece
- Jim Pressdee (1949–1965): JS Pressdee
- Mark Price (1984–1985): MR Price

== R ==
- David Reason (1921–1922): DJ Reason
- Tom Reason (1923): TF Reason
- George Reed (1934–1938): GH Reed
- Michael Reed (2012–2013): MT Reed
- Alan Rees (1955–1971): AHM Rees
- Gareth Rees (2006–2014): GP Rees
- Steven Reingold (2021): SJ Reingold
- Graham Reynolds (1969–1971): GEA Reynolds
- Hubert Rhys (1929–1930): HRJ Rhys
- Gwyn Richards (1971–1979): G Richards
- Viv Richards (1990–1993): IVA Richards
- John Riches (1947): JDH Riches
- Norman Riches (1921–1934): NVH Riches
- Jack Rippon (1947–1948): TJ Rippon
- John Roberts (1934–1936): JF Roberts
- Martin Roberts (1985–1991): ML Roberts
- Maurice Robinson (1946–1950): M Robinson
- Paul Roebuck (1988): PGP Roebuck
- Basil Rogers (1923): BL Rogers
- Billy Root (2019–2025): WT Root
- Andrew Roseberry (1994–1995): A Roseberry
- Charles Rowe (1982–1984): CJC Rowe
- Jacques Rudolph (2014–2017): JA Rudolph
- Hamish Rutherford (2021): HD Rutherford
- Frank Ryan (1922–1931): FP Ryan

== S ==
- Andrew Salter (2012–2023): AG Salter
- Daren Sammy (2014): DJG Sammy
- Glyn Samuel (1936): GNTW Samuel
- Nick Selman (2016–2021): NJ Selman
- Mike Selvey (1983–1984): MWW Selvey
- Adam Shantry (2008–2011): AJ Shantry
- James Sharples (1922): JE Sharples
- Ravi Shastri (1987–1991): RJ Shastri
- Adrian Shaw (1992–2003): AD Shaw
- George Shaw (1951–1955): GB Shaw
- Alf Shea (1928): AJ Shea
- Dennis Shea (1947–1948): WD Shea
- Fraser Sheat (2024): FW Sheat
- Don Shepherd (1950–1972): DJ Shepherd
- Shubman Gill (2022): Shubman Gill
- Samuel Silkin, Baron Silkin of Dulwich (1938): SC Silkin
- Prem Sisodiya (2018–2023): P Sisodiya
- Billy Slade (1961–1967): WD Slade
- Will Smale (2023–2025): WTE Smale
- Cyril Smart (1927–1946): CC Smart
- Chris Smith (1979): CL Smith
- Ian Smith (1985–1991): I Smith
- Ruaidhri Smith (2013–2023): RAJ Smith
- John Solanky (1972–1976): JW Solanky
- Chris Sole (2024): CB Sole
- Kamal Somaia (1989): KA Somaia
- Charles Spencer (1925): CR Spencer
- Helm Spencer (1923–1925): H Spencer
- Cecil Spiller (1922): CW Spiller
- Billy Spiller (1921–1923): W Spiller
- John Steele (1984–1986): JF Steele
- Theo Stewart (1923): TL Stewart
- Dale Steyn (2016): DW Steyn
- Jimmy Stone (1922–1923): J Stone
- Dennis Sullivan (1922–1928): D Sullivan
- Peter Swart (1978–1979): PD Swart
- Edward Sweet-Escott (1921): ER Sweet–Escott
- Mitchell Swepson (2023): MJ Swepson
- Harry Symonds (1921–1925): HG Symonds

== T ==
- Callum Taylor (2019–2023): CZ Taylor
- Asa Tribe (2024–2025): AM Tribe

== V ==
- Timm van der Gugten (2016–2025): T van der Gugten
- Martin van Jaarsveld (2012): M van Jaarsveld
- Corrie van Zyl (1987–1988): CJPG van Zyl
- Hugh Vaughan-Thomas (1933): HW Vaughan–Thomas

== W ==
- Graham Wagg (2011–2020): GG Wagg
- Peter Walker (1956–1972): PM Walker
- Roman Walker (2019–2021): RI Walker
- Mark Wallace (1999–2016): MA Wallace
- Cyril Walters (1923–1928): CF Walters
- Stewart Walters (2011–2014): SJ Walters
- Waqar Younis (1997–1998): Waqar Younis
- Don Ward (1954–1962): DJ Ward
- Claude Warner (1923): CC Warner
- Paul Warren (1997): PM Warren
- Huw Waters (2005–2013): HT Waters
- Steve Watkin (1986–2001): SL Watkin
- Allan Watkins (1939–1961): AJ Watkins
- Ryan Watkins (2003–2009): RE Watkins
- Bill Watkins (1950): WM Watkins
- James Weighell (2021–2022): WJ Weighell
- Gwilym Went (1934): GJH Went
- Alex Wharf (2000–2009): AG Wharf
- Brad Wheal (2024): BTJ Wheal
- Ossie Wheatley (1961–1969/70): OS Wheatley
- Butch White (1972): DW White
- Willie Whitehill (1960): WK Whitehill
- Eric Whitman (1932): EIE Whitman
- Tom Whittington (1921–1923): TAL Whittington
- Alan Wilkins (1975–1983): AH Wilkins
- Dyson Williams (1921): DB Williams
- Lawrence Williams (1969–1977): DL Williams
- Ieuan Williams (1931): I Williams
- James Williams (1993): JRA Williams
- Tip Williams (1928–1930): LEW Williams
- Matthew Wood (2008): MJ Wood
- Wilf Wooller (1938–1962): W Wooller
- Francis Worsley (1922–1923): FF Worsley
- Ben Wright (2006–2015): BJ Wright
- Damien Wright (2007): DG Wright

== Y ==
- Younis Ahmed (1984–1986): Younis Ahmed

== Z ==
- Zain-ul-Hassan (2023–2025): Zain-ul-Hassan

== See also ==
- List of Glamorgan cricket captains
