= George Shaw =

George Shaw may refer to:

- George Shaw (academic dress scholar) (1928–2006), biologist and British expert on academic dress
- George Shaw (architect) (1810–1876), English architect
- George Shaw (artist) (born 1966), English contemporary artist
- George Shaw (biologist) (1751–1813), English botanist and zoologist
- George Shaw (civil servant), lieutenant governor of the British Crown Colony of Burma, 1913
- George Shaw (composer), musician and film composer
- George Shaw (Queensland politician) (1913–1966), member of the Australian House of Representatives
- George Shaw (Tasmanian politician) (born 1932), member of the Tasmanian Legislative Council
- George B. Shaw (1854–1894), U.S. representative from Wisconsin
- George Bernard Shaw (1856–1950), Irish playwright
- George C. Shaw (1866–1960), Philippine–American War Medal of Honor recipient
- George Ferdinand Shaw (1821–1899), Irish academic and journalist
- George R. Shaw (1848–1937), American architect
- George Ernest Shaw (1877–1958), British colonial administrator

== Sportspeople ==
- George Shaw (American football) (1933–1998), American football quarterback
- George Shaw (cricketer, born 1839) (1839–1905), English cricketer
- George Shaw (cricketer, born 1931) (1931–1984), Welsh cricketer
- George Shaw (footballer, born 1877) (1877–1954), Australian rules footballer in the 1890s
- George Shaw (footballer, born 1886) (1886–1971), Australian rules footballer in the 1910s
- George Shaw (footballer, born 1899) (1899–1973), English football player
- George Shaw (footballer, born 1969), Scottish football player & manager of Forfar
- George Shaw (triple jumper) (1931–1988), American Olympic athlete
- Slotch Shaw (George Shaw, 1865–1928), English footballer
