= List of Glamorgan cricket captains =

Glamorgan County Cricket Club was officially founded on 6 July 1888. Glamorgan's team was elevated to first-class status in May 1921 when the club joined the County Championship. It is one of eighteen county teams in England and Wales that play first-class cricket. The player appointed club captain leads the team in all fixtures except if unavailable.

- Norman Riches (1921, 1929)
- Tom Whittington (1922–1923)
- Johnnie Clay (1924–1927, 1929, 1946)
- Trevor Arnott (1928)
- Maurice Turnbull (1930–1939)
- Wilf Wooller (1947–1960)
- Ossie Wheatley (1961–1966)
- Tony Lewis (1967–1972)
- Majid Khan (1973–1976)
- Alan Jones (1974, 1976–1978)
- Robin Hobbs (1979)
- Malcolm Nash (1980–1981)
- Javed Miandad (1982)
- Barry Lloyd (1982)
- Mike Selvey (1983–1984)
- Rodney Ontong (1984–1986)
- Hugh Morris (1986–1989, 1993–1995)
- Alan Butcher (1989–1992)
- Matthew Maynard (1992, 1996–2000)
- Steve James (2001–2003)
- Robert Croft (2003–2006)
- David Hemp (2006–2008)
- Jamie Dalrymple (2009–2010)
- Alviro Petersen (2011)
- Mark Wallace (2012–2014)
- Jacques Rudolph (2015-2017)
- Michael Hogan (2017-2018)
- Chris Cooke (2019-2021)
- David Lloyd (2021-2023)
- Sam Northeast (2024-2025)
- Kiran Carlson (2026-)

== See also ==
- List of Glamorgan CCC players
