= Dauncey =

Dauncey is a European surname.

The surname had several spelling variations, including:

- Dancey
- Dauncy
- Dauntsey
- Dance
- Dancie
- Dauncie
- Dauntsie

== People ==
People with the surname Dauncey, include:

- Bert Dauncey (1871–1955), Welsh international rugby union player
- Derek Dauncey (born 1965), English rally car manager
- Gilbert Dauncey (born 1936), Welsh cricketer
- Harry Moore Dauncey (1863–1832), British Christian missionary to Papua New Guinea
- Jaime Dauncey (born 1976), Canadian professional wrestler
