= Mark Davies =

Mark or Marc Davies may refer to:

- Mark Davies (athlete) (1960–2011), Australian Paralympic athlete
- Mark Davies (footballer, born 1988), English footballer with Bolton Wanderers
- Mark Davies (South African soccer)
- Mark Davies (rugby union) (born 1958), Wales international rugby union player
- Mark Davies (cricketer, born 1980), former English cricketer
- Mark Davies (cricketer, born 1959), former Welsh cricketer
- Mark Davies (cricketer, born 1969), former Welsh cricketer
- Mark Davies (cricketer, born 1962), former English cricketer
- Mark Davies (bishop of Middleton) (born 1962), British Anglican bishop
- Mark Davies (bishop of Shrewsbury) (born 1959), British Roman Catholic bishop
- Mark Davies (linguist) (born 1963), professor of linguistics at Brigham Young University
- Marc Davies, character in The Man from Saigon

== See also ==
- Mark Davis (disambiguation)
- Marc Davis (disambiguation)
