= Foat =

Foat is a surname. Notable people with the surname include:

- Ginny Foat (born 1941), American politician
- Jim Foat (born 1952), English cricketer
