= Martin Roberts =

Martin Roberts may refer to:

- Martin Roberts (designer) (born 1943), British retail design expert, author and lecturer
- Martin Roberts (rugby union, born 1968) (1968–2016), English rugby union player
- Martin Roberts (rugby union, born 1986), Wales international rugby union footballer
- Martin Roberts (presenter) (born 1963), British television presenter
- Martin Roberts (swimmer) (born 1966), Australian former swimmer
- Martin Roberts (cricketer) (born 1966), English cricketer
