= Kirnon =

Kirnon is a surname. Notable people with the surname include:

- Conrad Henry Kirnon (1927–1994), known professionally as Connie Kay, American jazz and R&B drummer
- Hodge Kirnon (1891–1962), Montserratian scholar, historian, and literary critic
- Lucas Kirnon (born 2003), English and Montserratian footballer
- Sam Kirnon (born 1962), English cricketer
- Sarah Kirnon (born 1960s), West Indian chef
