= Steve Bastien =

Steve Bastien may refer to:

- Steve Bastien (cricketer) (born 1963), English cricketer
- Steve Bastien (decathlete) (born 1994), American decathlete
