= Hinwood =

Hinwood is surname. Notable people with the surname include:

- Bonaventure Hinwood (1930–2016), South African priest and poet
- John Hinwood (1894–1971), English cricketer
- Peter Hinwood (born 1946), English actor
- Rhyl Hinwood (born 1940), Australian sculptor
