= Maurice Robinson =

Maurice Robinson may refer to:

- Maurice Robinson (cricketer) (1921–1994), Irish cricketer
- Maurice Richard Robinson Jr. (1937–2021), American business executive
- Maurice A. Robinson (born 1947), American New Testament scholar
- Maurice Robinson, Northern Irish lorry driver charged with conspiracy to commit human trafficking among other crimes in the 2019 Essex lorry deaths
