= William Emery =

William Emery may refer to:

- William Emery (priest), Anglican priest
- William Emery (MP) (died 1432), Member of Parliament for Canterbury
- Bill Emery (engineer) (born 1951), engineer and CEO of the Office of Rail Regulation
- Bill Emery (cricketer) (1897–1962), Welsh cricketer
