= Andrew Mack =

Andrew Mack may refer to:

- Andrew Mack (politician) (1780–1854), American businessman, mayor of Detroit and co-founder of the Detroit Free Press
- Andrew Mack (actor) (1863–1931), American vaudevillian, actor, singer and songwriter
- Andy Mack (born 1956), English cricketer
