= Watkin Jones =

Watkin Jones may refer to:

- Wat Jones (1917–1994), a Welsh cricketer
- Watkin Tudor Jones (born 1974), a South African rapper and record producer
- Watkin Jones (Watcyn o Feirion, 1882–1967), Welsh postmaster and father of Elizabeth Watkin Jones
- Watkins Jones, an author of Sherlock Holmes and the Occult: The Case of the Scarlet Women
- Watkin Jones plc, a British construction and build to rent company
