= Jack Johns =

Jack Johns may refer to:

- Jack Johns (cricketer) (1885–1956), Welsh cricketer
- Jack Johns (rugby league) (born 1997), Australian former rugby league footballer
