= Bob Dudley-Jones =

Welsh cricketer

Personal information
- Full name: Robert David Louis Dudley-Jones
- Born: 26 May 1952 (age 74); Bridgend, Glamorgan, Wales
- Batting: Right-handed
- Bowling: Right-arm medium

Domestic team information
- Years: Team
- 1972–1974: Glamorgan

Career statistics
Competition	FC	LA
Matches	5	5
Runs scored	15	4
Batting average	3.00	1.33
100s/50s	–/–	–/–
Top score	5	3
Balls bowled	533	175
Wickets	13	4
Bowling average	27.00	32.75
5 wickets in innings	–	–
10 wickets in match	–	–
Best bowling	4/31	2/31
Catches/stumpings	1/–	1/–
- Source: Cricinfo, 26 June 2010

Robert David Louis Dudley-Jones (born 26 May 1952) is a former Welsh cricketer who played for Glamorgan from 1972 to 1974. He was a right-arm medium pace bowler and right-handed batsman.

== Life and career ==
Bob Dudley-Jones was born in Bridgend, Glamorgan, and educated at Millfield School, where his teammates in the undefeated First XI in 1970 included David Graveney, Peter Roebuck and Jim Foat. He went on to Cardiff College of Education, where he studied to be a teacher.

While studying in Cardiff, Dudley-Jones made his debut for Glamorgan in a first-class match in the 1972 County Championship against Hampshire. He played four further first-class matches for the county from 1972 to 1973, his final match coming against Worcestershire. In his first-class career, he took 13 wickets at a bowling average of 27.00, with best figures of 4/31.

He made his List-A debut for Glamorgan in a match against Kent in 1972. He played four further List-A matches for the county from 1972 to 1974, his final List-A match coming against Minor Counties South in the 1974 Benson & Hedges Cup.

When he completed his studies in 1974 he retired from first-class cricket. He taught for many years at Llanishen High School in Cardiff.
