= Andrew Davies (cricketer, born 1962) =

English cricketer

Personal information
- Full name: Andrew George Davies
- Born: 15 May 1962 (age 64); Altrincham, Cheshire, England
- Batting: Right-handed
- Role: Wicket-keeper

Domestic team information
- Years: Team
- 1989: Buckinghamshire
- 1983–1985: Combined Universities
- 1982–1989: Cambridge University

Career statistics
Competition	First-class	List A
Matches	22	9
Runs scored	494	68
Batting average	19.00	13.60
100s/50s	–/3	–/–
Top score	69	20
Balls bowled	–	–
Wickets	–	–
Bowling average	–	–
5 wickets in innings	–	–
10 wickets in match	–	–
Best bowling	–	–
Catches/stumpings	28/4	12/2
- Source: Cricinfo, 7 April 2024

Andrew George Davies (born 15 May 1962) is a former English cricketer. Davies was a right-handed batsman who fielded as a wicket-keeper.

Davies was born at Altrincham, Cheshire into a cricketing family. His uncles, Roy and Haydn Davies both played first-class cricket for Glamorgan. His son Jack currently plays for Middlesex.

He made his first-class debut for Cambridge University against Essex in 1982. Davies played 21 further first-class matches for the university, the last of which came against Essex in 1989. In his 22 first-class matches, he scored 494 runs at a batting average of 19.00, with a high score of 69. This came against Surrey in 1984. Behind the stumps, he took 28 catches and made 4 stumpings.

He made his List A debut for Combined Universities in the 1983 Benson & Hedges Cup against Surrey. He played a further 8 List A matches for Combined Universities, the last coming against Essex in the 1985 Benson & Hedges Cup. In his 9 List A matches, he scored 68 runs at an average of 13.60, with a high score of 20. Behind the stumps, he took 12 catches and made 2 stumpings.

Davies played a single Minor Counties Championship match for Buckinghamshire against Wales Minor Counties.
