= Wayne Law =

Welsh cricketer (born 1978)

Personal information
- Full name: Wayne Lincoln Law
- Born: 4 September 1978 (age 48); Swansea, Glamorgan, Wales
- Batting: Right-handed
- Bowling: Right-arm off break

Domestic team information
- Years: Team
- 1997–1998: Wales Minor Counties
- 1997–2000: Glamorgan

Career statistics
Competition	First-class	List A
Matches	23	11
Runs scored	883	104
Batting average	28.48	11.55
100s/50s	1/5	–/–
Top score	131	24
Balls bowled	139	6
Wickets	3	–
Bowling average	29.66	–
5 wickets in innings	–	–
10 wickets in match	–	–
Best bowling	2/29	–
Catches/stumpings	11/–	3/–
- Source: Cricinfo, 10 November 2011

Wayne Lincoln Law (born 4 September 1978) is a former Welsh cricketer. Law was a right-handed batsman who bowled right-arm off break. He was born at Swansea, Glamorgan.

Having played since his teens for Swansea Cricket Club, the Glamorgan Second XI since 1995, as well as having spent time on the Lord's groundstaff where he played for MCC Young Cricketers in 1996, Law eventually made his first-class debut for Glamorgan in 1997 against Oxford University, hitting his first ball of the match for four and eventually ending on 38 not out in Glamorgan's second-innings. This was his only first-class appearance that season, though he made his List A debut, playing in Glamorgan's final two fixtures of the 1997 AXA Life League against Surrey and Essex. During this season, Law also appeared once for Wales Minor Counties against Herefordshire in the Minor Counties Championship, while the following season he would make a single MCCA Knockout Trophy appearance for the club against the Warwickshire Cricket Board.

His performances encouraged then Glamorgan coach Duncan Fletcher, who considered Law to have natural flair and graceful timing, to give him an extended run in the Glamorgan side the following season, following the retirement of Hugh Morris at the end of the 1997 season. Over the coming three seasons, he made a total of 22 further first-class appearances, the last of which came against Nottinghamshire in the 2000 County Championship. In total, he scored 883 runs at an average of 28.48, with a high score of 131. This innings of note came against Lancashire at Colwyn Bay in 1998. Though he struggled for consistency, he still made notable contributions to the Glamorgan cause, notably against Lancashire at Blackpool in 1999 when he held out against Muttiah Muralitharan for over four hours in making 53 in Glamorgan's second-innings, though Lancashire still won the game by 10 wickets. Law was utilised more in first-class cricket, making just nine further List A appearances following his debut in that format in 1997. He played his final List A match against Middlesex in the 2000 National League. Law struggled during the opportunities he was given in this format, scoring just 104 runs at an average of 11.55, with a high score of 24.

Having failed to secure a regular place in the Glamorgan team during the 2000 season, Law was released by county at the end of that season.
