= Plantsbrook School =

Location
- Upper Holland Road; Sutton Coldfield, West Midlands, B72 1RB; England; 52°33′31″N 1°49′07″W

Information
- Type: Academy
- Motto: Be The Best That You Can Be
- Local authority: Birmingham City Council
- Department for Education URN: 137053 Tables
- Ofsted: Reports
- Chair of Governors: P Arkinstall
- Headteacher: Kerensa Neal
- Gender: Coeducational
- Age: 11 to 18
- Enrolment: 1,519
- Website: Official website

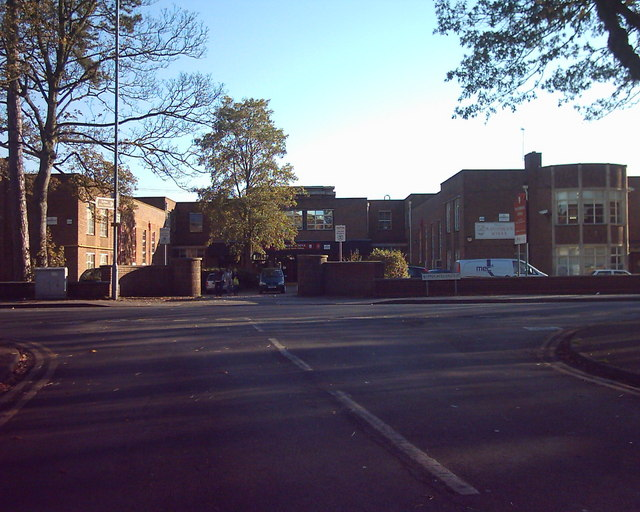
The school in November 2006

Plantsbrook School, (formerly Riland Bedford High School), is a secondary school with academy status located in Sutton Coldfield, Birmingham, England. The school achieved an "Outstanding" Ofsted status once in 2012. The most recent ratings were "Good" in 2019, and "Requires improvement" in 2016. The school was a Technology College and a Music College before the Specialist Schools initiative was made defunct.

The school has recently undergone a £20 million refurbishment with the gradual demolition of the formerly used 1940s building.

== History ==
Built on the land where Holland House in Upper Holland Road once stood, the original Riland Bedford building was constructed in 1939 with later building work being undertaken by American soldiers who were using the school as a base during World War II at the temporary named Holland Road Barracks. After the war, building works on the school were completed and Riland Bedford School was opened in 1946.

When the school first opened, male and female students were kept on different sides of the building. One half was named Riland Bedford High School for Boys and the other, Riland Bedford High School for Girls. The original building's symmetry provided exactly the same facilities and space for both schools.

The school's first incarnation, was so called as a result of the union of the prominent Riland and Bedford families of Sutton Coldfield. The school officially changed its name in 1986, choosing to rename itself Plantsbrook School, from Plants Brook which is a stream that flows through Sutton Coldfield and passes the school.

The school officially adopted academy status on 1 August 2011. Thereby ceasing to be a state comprehensive.

== Activities ==
The school hosts a yearly school musical which is the high point of the year for most students and involves the entire Performing Arts faculty.

The student-run radio station, PB Radio, formerly known as PBR FM and Plantsbrook School Radio, was broadcast internally and on the internet from its studio on the site. The station is currently inactive.

== Rebuild ==
The school and the surrounding grounds are currently being completely rebuilt as part of the Priority Schools Building Programme. The school was one of only a few select schools to win the highly sought after government grant to completely rebuild the school and its grounds. It was awarded £20 million with the first phase of building work commencing in Summer 2015. At present, the entire former West and East wings of the school have been demolished, with the former vacant areas now being landscaped. The new school building was due to be completed and opened in Easter 2017. The official handover took place in August 2017 predominantly to avoid disruption to students and staff during the summer exam months . At present, the school grounds and a new Sports Hall are aimed for completion by Spring 2019.

On Saturday 11 July 2015, the school held an open day where students and teachers past and present of Riland Bedford and Plantsbrook had the opportunity to have one last look at the existing building before the demolition began in the summer. Classrooms were opened and activities were organised allowing visitors to tour the building they once worked in.

Wednesday 19 July 2017, marked the last official school day in the original school building, with the school closing two days earlier than most local schools in order to allow two days for staff to put all their classroom equipment into storage ready to be transferred to the new school building when it opened in September 2017.

== Notable former pupils ==
=== Riland Bedford School ===
- Derek Dauncey
- David Lowe, composer of the BBC News ident theme

=== Plantsbrook School ===
- Mathcore band Blakfish met and formed at the school in 2000.
- Andrew Tunnicliffe, Journalist and Editor for several magazines and journals including Defence and Security Systems International and RealClear Defense.

== Former teachers ==
- David Jamieson, Labour West Midlands Police and Crime Commissioner since 2014, Labour MP from 1992-2005 for Plymouth Devonport (taught Maths at Riland Bedford)
