= Mark Davis =

Mark Davis may refer to:

== Entertainers ==
- Mark Davis (talk show host), American radio talk show host
- Mark Jonathan Davis (born 1965), American actor/singer and creator of Richard Cheese
- Mark Davis, American bassist and founding member for the band Emmure
- Mark Davis (actor) (born 1965), English adult film actor
- Mark Davis (Canadian musician), Canadian alternative country and indie rock musician

== Sports ==
- Mark Davis (American football) (born 1955), American principal owner of the NFL's Las Vegas Raiders and WNBA's Las Vegas Aces
- Mark Davis (pitcher) (born 1960), American Major League Baseball player
- Mark Davis (outfielder) (born 1964), American Major League Baseball player
- Mark Davis (basketball, born 1960), former player in the Australian National Basketball League
- Mark Davis (basketball, born 1973), American former National Basketball Association player
- Mark Davis (basketball, born 1963), American former National Basketball Association player
- Mark Davis (snooker player) (born 1972), English snooker player
- Mark Davis (golfer) (born 1964), English golfer
- Mark Davis (English cricketer) (born 1962), English cricketer, played for Somerset and Wiltshire
- Mark Davis (South African cricketer) (born 1971), South African former cricketer, played for Northern Transvaal and then in England for MCC and Sussex
- Mark Davis (fisherman) (born 1963), American bass fisher
- Mark Davis (boxer) (born 1987), American lightweight boxer
- Mark Davis (footballer) (born 1969), English footballer
- Mark Davis (wrestler) (born 1990), Australian professional wrestler
- Mark Davis (rugby union) (born 1970), Welsh rugby union player

== Other ==
- Mark Davis (journalist), Australian journalist for Dateline
- Mark A. Davis (born 1966), North Carolina judge
- Mark H. A. Davis (1945–2020), English mathematician
- Mark Davis (Unicode) (born 1952), American co-founder and president of the Unicode Consortium
- Mark Steven Davis (born 1962), U.S. federal judge
- Mark E. Davis (born 1955), American professor of chemical engineering at the California Institute of Technology
- Mark M. Davis (born 1952), American professor of immunology at Stanford University
- Mark S. Davis, American trial lawyer based in Honolulu
- Mark Davis (producer) American music producer

== See also ==
- Mark Davies (disambiguation)
- Mark Davis Pro Bass Challenge
- Mark Davis' The Fishing Master
