= Robert Hadley =

Welsh cricketer

Personal information
- Full name: Robert John Hadley
- Born: 22 October 1951 (age 75); Neath, Neath Port Talbot, Wales
- Batting: Right-handed
- Bowling: Left-arm fast-medium

Domestic team information
- Years: Team
- 1971: Glamorgan
- 1971–1973: Cambridge University

Career statistics
Competition	First-class	List A
Matches	28	3
Runs scored	65	1
Batting average	3.25	1.00
100s/50s	–/–	–/–
Top score	15	1
Balls bowled	3,433	180
Wickets	56	1
Bowling average	29.41	119.00
5 wickets in innings	3	–
10 wickets in match	–	–
Best bowling	5/31	1/65
Catches/stumpings	8/–	1/–
- Source: Cricinfo, 10 June 2012

Robert John Hadley (born 22 October 1951) is a former Welsh cricketer. Hadley was a right-handed batsman who bowled left-arm fast-medium. He was born at Neath, Glamorgan.

While studying at St John's College, Cambridge, Hadley made his first-class debut for Cambridge University against Warwickshire at Fenner's in 1971. He made six further first-class appearances in that season for the university. In that same season he also made two first-class appearances for Glamorgan, against Leicestershire and Somerset in the County Championship. Against Leicestershire he took his maiden five wicket haul, with figures of 5/32 during Leicestershire's first-innings. These were to be his only first-class appearances for Glamorgan. He continued to play first-class cricket for Cambridge University in 1972 and 1973, making seventeen further first-class appearances, the last of which came against Oxford University in The University Match at Lord's. In total he made 24 first-class appearances for the university, taking 47 wickets at an average of 30.17, with best figures of 5/31. These figures were one of two five wicket hauls he took for the university and came against Sussex in 1972. He also made two first-class appearances for a combined Oxford and Cambridge Universities team, against the touring Australians in 1972 and the touring New Zealanders in 1973.

Hadley also appeared in three List A matches for Cambridge University in the 1972 Benson & Hedges Cup, playing against Warwickshire, Worcestershire, and Northamptonshire in the group stages of the competition. He had little success in these matches, taking just a single wicket.

He became a doctor.
