= Clive Davies =

Welsh cricketer (born 1951)

Personal information
- Full name: Thomas Clive Davies
- Born: 7 November 1951 (age 75); Pontrhydyfen, Glamorgan, Wales
- Batting: Right-handed
- Bowling: Slow left-arm orthodox

Domestic team information
- Years: Team
- 1971–1972: Glamorgan

Career statistics
Competition	First-class
Matches	7
Runs scored	9
Batting average	4.50
100s/50s	–/–
Top score	5
Balls bowled	1,267
Wickets	18
Bowling average	34.72
5 wickets in innings	–
10 wickets in match	–
Best bowling	3/22
Catches/stumpings	–/–
- Source: Cricinfo, 18 September 2011

Thomas Clive Davies (born 7 November 1951) is a former Welsh cricketer. Davies was a right-handed batsman who bowled slow left-arm orthodox. He was born in Pontrhydyfen, Glamorgan.

Having spent time on the staff at Lord's in 1969 and 1970, Davies made his first-class debut for Glamorgan against Leicestershire in the 1971 County Championship and in his first game he took three first-innings wickets for 22 runs, but these proved to be the best bowling figures of his career. He made five further first-class appearances for Glamorgan in 1971, and returned in 1972 for a single match against Cambridge University.
