= John Madden-Gaskell =

English cricketer

John Madden
Personal information
- Full name: John Charles Pengelley Madden
- Born: 1 March 1896; Pontypool, Monmouthshire, England
- Died: 4 February 1975 (aged 78); Lowertown, Helston, Cornwall, England
- Batting: Right-handed

Domestic team information
- Years: Team
- 1922: Glamorgan
- 1928–1930: Somerset

Career statistics
Competition	FC
Matches	10
Runs scored	300
Batting average	15.78
100s/50s	0/2
Top score	63
Balls bowled	3
Wickets	0
Bowling average	–
5 wickets in innings	–
10 wickets in match	–
Best bowling	0/8
Catches/stumpings	5/–
- Source: CricketArchive, 22 December 2015

John Charles Pengelley Madden-Gaskell OBE TD, also known as John Madden (1 March 1896 – 4 February 1975) was a soldier and cricketer who played first-class cricket for Glamorgan and Somerset between 1922 and 1930. He was born at Pontypool, Monmouthshire and died at Helston, Cornwall.

Educated at Haileybury College, Madden-Gaskell played as a right-handed batsman. He appeared in one match for Glamorgan as J. C. P. Madden in 1922, scoring 7 and 32 in the game against Yorkshire at Leeds. That was his only game for Glamorgan.

In 1928, playing as J. C. P. Madden-Gaskell, he played seven matches for Somerset, starting with an innings of 51 when batting at No 9 in the match against Kent at Taunton. He added 89 in 75 minutes for the eighth wicket with Box Case. Returning to the Somerset side in an injury crisis in mid-season, Madden-Gaskell was used as an opener and had instant success in the match against Nottinghamshire at Taunton, scoring 42 and 63 against an attack containing Harold Larwood, Fred Barratt and Bill Voce. The 63, which contained 11 fours, was his highest first-class score. He was less successful in later games and returned to the middle of the batting order. Two further matches in 1930 were also unsuccessful, and were the last of his first-class career.

Madden-Gaskell served in the First World War with the Second Battalion of the Welch Regiment as a Second Lieutenant in charge of training and logistics. In the Second World War he joined the Royal Artillery. He was soon promoted to the rank of Major and served as Deputy Assistant Quartermaster-General, and in this capacity in 1944 he was one of the military team who oversaw the provisioning of food and equipment for Operation Overlord. For his war service he was awarded the MBE in the New Year Honours in 1947.

In 1965 he changed his name from Madden-Gaskell to Madden.
