= Stuart Harrison =

Welsh cricketer

Personal information
- Full name: Stuart Charles Harrison
- Born: 21 September 1951 (age 75); Cwmbran, Monmouthshire
- Batting: Right-handed
- Bowling: Right-arm fast-medium
- Relatives: David Harrison (son); Adam Harrison (son)

Domestic team information
- Years: Team
- 1971–1977: Glamorgan

Career statistics
Competition	First-class	List A
Matches	5	10
Runs scored	32	57
Batting average	5.33	19.00
100s/50s	0/0	0/0
Top score	15	20*
Balls bowled	558	448
Wickets	7	10
Bowling average	44.85	34.70
5 wickets in innings	0	0
10 wickets in match	0	0
Best bowling	3/55	3/47
Catches/stumpings	1/–	1/–
- Source: Cricinfo, 18 September 2011

Stuart Charles Harrison (born 21 September 1951) is a former Welsh cricketer. Harrison was a right-handed batsman who bowled right-arm fast-medium. He was born in Cwmbran, Monmouthshire.

Harrison made his first-class debut for Glamorgan against Somerset in the 1971 County Championship. He made four further first-class appearances for Glamorgan, the last of which came against Yorkshire in the 1977 County Championship. In his role as a bowler, Harrison took 7 wickets in his five first-class matches, which came at an average of 44.85, with best figures of 3/55. His List A debut came in the 1972 John Player League against Middlesex. He made nine further List A appearances, the last of which came against Middlesex in the 1974 John Player League. In his ten List A matches, he took 10 wickets at an average of 34.70, with best figures of 3/47. With the bat, he scored 57 runs at a batting average of 19.00, with a high score of 20 not out.

While playing for Glamorgan between 1971 and 1974, Harrison was studying at Caerleon College of Education to become a teacher. He subsequently had a successful career as a teacher in Monmouthshire. He has served on the Glamorgan committee. He is the father of David and Adam Harrison, both of whom have played for Glamorgan.
