= Ernie Harris (cricketer) =

Welsh cricketer

Personal information
- Full name: Wilfred Ernest Harris
- Born: 24 April 1919; St Fagans ,Cardiff, Glamorgan, Wales
- Died: 4 December 1996 (aged 77); Cardiff, Glamorgan, Wales
- Batting: Right-handed
- Bowling: Right-arm medium-pace
- Relatives: Leslie Harris (brother)

Domestic team information
- Years: Team
- 1938-1947: Glamorgan

Career statistics
Competition	FC
Matches	5
Runs scored	59
Batting average	7.35
100s/50s	–/–
Top score	25
Balls bowled	64
Wickets	–
Bowling average	–
5 wickets in innings	–
10 wickets in match	–
Best bowling	–
Catches/stumpings	1/–
- Source: Cricinfo, 14 September 2010

Wilfred Ernest Harris (24 April 1919 – 4 December 1996) was a former Welsh cricketer. Harris was a right-handed batsman who bowled right-arm medium-pace. He was born at Cardiff, Glamorgan.

== Cricket ==
In 1937, Harris played 2 Minor Counties Championship matches for the Glamorgan Second XI against the Kent Second XI. The following season Harris played his first first-class match for Glamorgan against Kent in the County Championship. From 1938 to 1939, he played 3 first-class matches for Glamorgan, finally playing his last first-class match following the Second World War in 1947 against Yorkshire at Bramall Lane, Sheffield.

== Personal life ==
Harris played club cricket for St. Fagan's Cricket Club from the mid-1930s to the mid-1980s, becoming a stalwart of the club for 5 decades. He also worked in administrative section of University College, Cardiff, where the eventually became the registrar. Later in life he served on the Glamorgan County Cricket Club committee and was the match manager when England played Australia in a One Day International at St. Helen's. Harris died on 4 December 1996. His brother Leslie Harris also played first-class cricket for Glamorgan.
