= Cecil Pearson =

English cricketer

Personal information
- Full name: Cecil Joseph Herbert Pearson
- Born: 22 January 1888; Poplar, London, England
- Died: 14 September 1971 (aged 83); Porthcawl, Glamorgan, Wales
- Batting: Right-handed
- Bowling: Right-arm off break

Domestic team information
- Years: Team
- 1922: Glamorgan

Career statistics
Competition	First-class
Matches	1
Runs scored	9
Batting average	4.50
100s/50s	0/0
Top score	9
Balls bowled	24
Wickets	0
Bowling average	–
5 wickets in innings	–
10 wickets in match	–
Best bowling	–
Catches/stumpings	0/–
- Source: Cricinfo, 9 June 2011

Cecil Joseph Herbert Pearson (22 January 1888 – 14 September 1971) was an English cricketer. A bespectacled cricketer, Pearson was a right-handed batsman who bowled right-arm off break. He was born in Poplar, London.

Pearson made his only first-class appearance for Glamorgan in the 1922 County Championship against Nottinghamshire. He bowled 4 overs in Nottinghamshire's first-innings, though he didn't take any wickets. In Glamorgan's first-innings, he scored 9 runs before being dismissed by Len Richmond. In their second-innings, he was dismissed for a duck by Fred Barratt, becoming one of Barratt's 8 victims in that innings, as a Glamorgan side in its second season of first-class cricket capitulated to 47 all out, to lose by an innings and 125 runs.

He died in Porthcawl, Glamorgan on 14 September 1971.
