= Roy Davies (cricketer) =

Welsh cricketer

Personal information
- Full name: David Roy Davies
- Born: 12 August 1928; Llanelli, Carmarthenshire, Wales
- Died: 14 July 2013 (aged 84); West Clandon, England
- Batting: Right-handed
- Relatives: Haydn Davies (brother); Andrew Davies (nephew)

Domestic team information
- Years: Team
- 1950: Glamorgan

Career statistics
Competition	FC
Matches	1
Runs scored	7
Batting average	7.00
100s/50s	–/–
Top score	7
Balls bowled	–
Wickets	–
Bowling average	–
5 wickets in innings	–
10 wickets in match	–
Best bowling	–
Catches/stumpings	–/–
- Source: Cricinfo, 3 July 2010

David Roy Davies (12 August 1928 – 14 July 2013) was a Welsh cricketer. Davies was a right-handed batsman. He was born at Llanelli, Carmarthenshire. He was educated in his later early years at Cardiff University.

Davies made a single first-class appearance for Glamorgan in 1950 against Somerset. In the match, he scored 7 runs in his only first-class innings.

Davies was an industrial chemist and fuel technologist who later worked for Unilever. Davies also played squash, a sport he represented Wales in.

== Family ==
Davies had an older brother, Haydn, who played first-class cricket for Glamorgan and the Marylebone Cricket Club. Both of their parents were killed during the Second World War, after which Haydn adopted Roy and became his legal father. His nephew Andrew Davies played first-class cricket for Cambridge University and List-A cricket for the Combined Universities.
