= Aubrey Edwards (cricketer) =

Welsh cricketer

Aubrey Edwards (5 July 1918 – 16 November 1997) was a Welsh cricketer. He was a right-handed batsman and a right-arm medium-pace seam bowler who played first-class cricket for Glamorgan. He was born in Penygraig.

After being educated at Cowbridge Grammar School, he articled to Messrs. Tudor Williams & Company, Chartered Auctioneers, Estate Agents and Surveyors of Cardiff, South Wales. In 1939, he was called into His Majesty's Forces, where he served in India and Burma until discharged in 1947 with the rank of Major, Welch Regiment.

Edwards made a single first-class appearance for Glamorgan during the 1947 season, as well as playing for the Glamorgan Second XI on several occasions. Edwards failed to score any runs during the match, but bowled 21 overs, taking three wickets. Following his exit from the game of cricket, Edwards emigrated to Canada, settling in Calgary, Alberta.

He joined the Calgary Real Estate Board in 1948 and formed Aubrey M. Edwards Ltd. in 1955. He was made a Fellow of the Chartered Institute of Realtors in 1956. He was a Past President and Honorary Life Member of the Calgary Real Estate Board, Past President of the Alberta Real Estate Association, Regional Vice-president, Canadian Association of Real Estate Boards, Member of the Governing Council, Canadian Institute of Realtors, and served on the Court of Revision for twenty-five years.

He was also an excellent rugby player, and he briefly played in the Canadian Football League.
