= Percy Morris (cricketer) =

Welsh cricketer

William Percy Morris (19 June 1881 – 30 July 1975) was a Welsh cricketer active from 1906 to 1925 who played for Glamorgan. He was born and died in Swansea. He appeared in nine first-class matches as a righthanded batsman who bowled right arm medium pace. He scored 159 runs with a highest score of 30 and took two wickets with a best performance of one for 11.
