= Jack Johns (cricketer) =

Welsh cricketer

John Johns (15 October 1885 – 10 January 1956) was a Welsh cricketer who played one first-class match for Glamorgan in 1922 at the age of 36. He was born in Briton Ferry and died in Neath.

Johns bowled right-arm fast-medium and batted right-handed in the lower order. Opening the bowling against Somerset in his only first-class match, he took a wicket, that of Sydney Rippon, stumped by Norman Riches, with the first ball of the innings. Rippon scored a century in the second innings to take Somerset to a nine-wicket victory. Johns took two wickets and scored four runs in the match.

Johns played most of his cricket for the Briton Ferry Town Cricket Club. He played a friendly match for Glamorgan in 1920, taking 11 wickets against Monmouthshire in the season before Glamorgan became a first-class county.
