= John Riches =

Welsh cricketer (1920–1999)

John Riches (30 December 1920 – 5 October 1999) was a Welsh cricketer. He was a right-handed batsman and a slow left-arm bowler who played first-class cricket for Glamorgan.

Riches made a single first-class appearance for Glamorgan in 1947, against Yorkshire, though he played for the Second XI between 1946 and 1957. Riches played regular club cricket for Cardiff, as well as playing with the MCC.

Riches' father, Norman, wife Pearl and great-uncle Gowan Clark, were all noted cricketers.
