= Closs Jones =

Welsh cricketer (1911–1989)

Personal information
- Full name: Emrys Closs Jones
- Born: 14 December 1911; Briton Ferry, Glamorgan, Wales
- Died: 14 April 1989 (aged 77); Briton Ferry, West Glamorgan, Wales
- Batting: Right-handed
- Bowling: Right-arm off-spin
- Role: All-rounder

Domestic team information
- Years: Team
- 1934–1946: Glamorgan

Career statistics
Competition	First-class
Matches	101
Runs scored	2,016
Batting average	18.00
100s/50s	2/7
Top score	132
Balls bowled	6,498
Wickets	103
Bowling average	32.47
5 wickets in innings	6
10 wickets in match	1
Best bowling	7/79
Catches/stumpings	44/–
- Source: Cricinfo, 17 February 2026

Emrys Closs Jones (14 December 1911 – 14 April 1989) was a Welsh cricketer who played first-class cricket for Glamorgan from 1934 to 1946. He appeared in 101 first-class matches as a right-handed batsman who bowled off breaks. He scored 2,016 runs with a highest score of 132 and took 103 wickets with a best performance of 7 for 79.

Jones played a few matches as an amateur from 1934 to 1936 before being engaged as a professional by Glamorgan for the 1937 season. He was successful with his off-spin immediately, taking 5 for 38 against Kent in the first match of the season, 5 for 60 in the next match against Lancashire, 7 for 79 two matches later against Sussex, and 4 for 53 and 6 for 41 in the next match in a victory over the touring New Zealanders. He was selected to play in a Test Trial match for The Rest against the Marylebone Cricket Club a few weeks later, but he suffered an injury early in the match, and struggled for the rest of the season.

Jones worked hard in the next two seasons to recover his form, and improved his batting, but he was unable to return to his bowling form of early 1937 before the Second World War interrupted cricket for six years. When cricket resumed in 1946 he played a few matches with indifferent results before retiring from professional cricket to take up a position in his home town with the Briton Ferry Steel Company.
