= Rupert Hill (cricketer) =

West Indian cricketer (born 1954)

Rupert Hill (born August 14, 1954) was a West Indian cricketer who played for Glamorgan. He was a right-handed batsman and a right-arm medium-pace bowler. He was born in Kingston.

A seam-bowler, the Jamaican played club cricket for Newport, Maesteg Town and Briton Ferry Town, but was only given one chance to prove himself at first-class level, against Cambridge University in the 1975 season. He also played one List A match, against Derbyshire in the same season.

Hill continued to play in the Second XI throughout 1976, and played one game in 1978, but made no further cricketing appearances beyond this point.
