= Dennis Shea =

Welsh cricketer

Personal information
- Full name: William Dennis Shea
- Born: 7 February 1924; Briton Ferry, Glamorgan, Wales
- Died: 22 September 1982 (aged 58); Ormskirk, Lancashire, England
- Batting: Right-handed
- Bowling: Leg break googly
- Relatives: Alf Shea (uncle)

Domestic team information
- Years: Team
- 1947–1948: Glamorgan

Career statistics
Competition	FC
Matches	3
Runs scored	27
Batting average	13.50
100s/50s	–/–
Top score	18*
Balls bowled	306
Wickets	5
Bowling average	36.00
5 wickets in innings	–
10 wickets in match	–
Best bowling	4/68
Catches/stumpings	–/–
- Source: Cricinfo, 4 July 2010

William Dennis Shea (7 February 1924 - 22 September 1982) was a Welsh cricketer. He was a right-handed batsman who bowled right-arm leg break googly.

Born at Briton Ferry, Glamorgan, Shea made his first-class debut for Glamorgan in the 1947 County Championship against Warwickshire. He played 1 further first-class match in the 1947 against Northamptonshire and played his final first-class match in 1948 against the Combined Services.

In his 3 first-class matches, he scored 27 runs at a batting average of 13.50, with a top score of 18*. With the ball he took 5 wickets at a bowling average of 36.00, with best figures 4/68.

== Death ==
Dennis Shea died at Ormskirk, Lancashire, aged 58, on 22 September 1982.

== Family ==
His uncle Alf Shea played 621 first-class matches for Glamorgan in 1928.
