= Alf Shea =

Welsh cricketer

Personal information
- Full name: Alfred James Shea
- Born: 7 November 1898; Briton Ferry, Glamorgan, Wales
- Died: 21 May 1969 (aged 70); Neath, Glamorgan, Wales
- Batting: Right-handed
- Bowling: Right-arm medium
- Relatives: Dennis Shea (nephew)

Domestic team information
- Years: Team
- 1928: Glamorgan

Career statistics
Competition	First-class
Matches	2
Runs scored	22
Batting average	7.33
100s/50s	–/–
Top score	10
Balls bowled	246
Wickets	1
Bowling average	171.00
5 wickets in innings	–
10 wickets in match	–
Best bowling	1/130
Catches/stumpings	–/–
- Source: Cricinfo, 27 July 2012

Alf Shea (November 7, 1898 – May 21, 1969) was a Welsh cricketer. He was a right-handed batsman and a right-arm medium-pace bowler who played for Glamorgan. He was born in Briton Ferry and died in Neath.

Shea played his club cricket with Briton Ferry and secured his chance to play two games for Glamorgan in 1928. He scored 22 runs in three innings and took just one wicket from 41 overs of bowling.

Shea's nephew, Dennis, made three first-class appearances for Glamorgan soon after the end of the Second World War.
