= George Shaw (footballer, born 1877) =

Australian rules footballer

Personal information
- Full name: Frederick George Shaw
- Born: 6 March 1877; Ballarat, Victoria
- Died: 24 March 1954 (aged 77); Blackburn, Victoria
- Original team: Fitzroy Crescent
- Height: 180 cm (5 ft 11 in)
- Weight: 73 kg (161 lb)

Playing career^{1}
Years	Club	Games (Goals)
1898	Fitzroy	5 (1)
- ^{1} Playing statistics correct to the end of 1898.

Frederick George Shaw (6 March 1877 – 24 March 1954) was an Australian rules footballer who played with Fitzroy in the Victorian Football League (VFL).
