= Trevil Morgan =

Welsh cricketer (1907–1976)

Personal information
- Full name: John Trevil Morgan
- Born: 7 May 1907; Cyncoed, Glamorgan, Wales
- Died: 18 December 1976 (aged 69); Leigh Woods, Bristol, England
- Batting: Left-handed
- Bowling: Right-arm medium
- Role: Occasional wicket-keeper
- Relatives: Niel Morgan (brother)

Domestic team information
- Years: Team
- 1928: Wales
- 1927–1930: Cambridge University
- 1925–1934: Glamorgan

Career statistics
Competition	First-class
Matches	83
Runs scored	2,339
Batting average	21.07
100s/50s	4/6
Top score	149
Balls bowled	2,676
Wickets	26
Bowling average	51.65
5 wickets in innings	0
10 wickets in match	0
Best bowling	3/16
Catches/stumpings	61/12
- Source: Cricinfo, 28 October 2012

John Trevil Morgan (7 May 1907 – 18 December 1976) was a Welsh cricketer who played first-class cricket for Glamorgan and Cambridge University between 1925 and 1934.

Morgan was a left-handed batsman who bowled right-arm medium pace and occasionally fielded as a wicket-keeper. He was born in Cyncoed, Glamorgan, and was educated at Charterhouse School and Jesus College, Cambridge.

Morgan, usually known as "JT", scored a century for Cambridge University in the 1929 University Match: going to the wicket at 137 for 5, he scored 149 out of 208 in three and a half hours. A few weeks later, he scored 103 not out of a Glamorgan total of 237 against the touring South Africans. He captained Cambridge in 1930, his final year, when they defeated Oxford. He captained Glamorgan's Second XI in the late 1930s and 1940s.

After graduating with a degree in history, Morgan returned to Cardiff to work in his family's department store, David Morgan, becoming chairman of the company in 1935. He served as a major in the Royal Artillery in World War II, and for his work in anti-aircraft duties in South Wales he was awarded the MBE in 1945.
