= Guy Daly =

English cricketer

Personal information
- Full name: Guy Nolan Daly
- Born: 4 September 1908; Bramley, Hampshire, England
- Died: 29 September 1991 (aged 83); Basingstoke, Hampshire, England
- Batting: Right-handed
- Bowling: Right-arm medium

Domestic team information
- Years: Team
- 1938: Glamorgan

Career statistics
Competition	First-class
Matches	1
Runs scored	9
Batting average	9.00
100s/50s	–/–
Top score	9
Balls bowled	42
Wickets	–
Bowling average	–
5 wickets in innings	–
10 wickets in match	–
Best bowling	–
Catches/stumpings	–/–
- Source: Cricinfo, 24 July 2011

Guy Nolan Daly (4 September 1908 – 29 September 1991) was an English cricketer. Daly was a right-handed batsman who bowled right-arm medium pace. He was born in Bramley, Hampshire. He was known in some sources as Guy Nolan O'Daly.

Daly made a single first-class appearance for Glamorgan against Cambridge University in 1938. In this match, he scored 9 runs in Glamorgan's first-innings, before being dismissed by Bertram Carris. He bowled 7 overs in the Cambridge University first-innings, after which he was injured and played no further part in the match with the ball. He did not bat in Glamorgan's second-innings. He made no further appearances for Glamorgan.

He died in Basingstoke, Hampshire on 29 September 1991.
