= Ricky Needham =

Welsh cricketer

Ricky Needham (born Patrick John Easthope Needham; 6 December 1951) was a Welsh cricketer. He was a left-handed batsman and a right-arm medium-pace bowler and occasional wicket-keeper. He was born in Canton.

Needham was a part of the Harrow cricketing XI between 1966 and 1970, playing his first matches at the age of fourteen. Needham played his first match for the Glamorgan Under-25 team in June 1973, followed by several matches for the Glamorgan Second XI during the 1973 and 1974 season. Having cut his teeth in the second team, Needham made the step up to the big time, making his one and only first-class appearance in 1975.

Needham played several matches for Wales during the 1970s and 1980s. He served for many years on the Glamorgan committee.
