= George Shaw (cricketer, born 1839) =

English cricketer (1839–1905)

George Shaw (20 May 1839 – 17 August 1905) was an English cricketer who played two first-class cricket matches for Kent County Cricket Club in 1872, primarily as a fast bowler.

Shaw was born at Sutton-in-Ashfield in Nottinghamshire in 1839, a village known for producing a number of professional cricketers during the 19th century. He played a number of matches for local Nottinghamshire cricket teams against All England Elevens between 1866 and 1871. His two first-class appearances came for Kent in August 1872 against the Gentlemen of the Marylebone Cricket Club (MCC) and Surrey.

He died at Loose near Maidstone in Kent in August 1905 aged 66.

== Bibliography ==
- Carlaw, Derek (2020). Kent County Cricketers, A to Z: Part One (1806–1914) (PDF). Cardiff: ACS.
