= Bill Davies (cricketer, born 1901) =

Welsh cricketer (1901–?)

Personal information
- Full name: William Henry Davies
- Born: Briton Ferry, Glamorgan
- Batting: Right-handed
- Bowling: Right-arm medium

Domestic team information
- Years: Team
- 1922–1927: Glamorgan

Career statistics
Competition	FC
Matches	5
Runs scored	33
Batting average	4.12
100s/50s	–/–
Top score	8*
Balls bowled	351
Wickets	3
Bowling average	43.33
5 wickets in innings	–
10 wickets in match	–
Best bowling	2/35
Catches/stumpings	–/–
- Source: Cricinfo, 26 June 2010

William Henry Davies (born 7 August 1901, date of death unknown) was a Welsh cricketer. Davies was a right-handed batsman who bowled right-arm medium pace. He was born at Briton Ferry, Glamorgan.

Davies represented Glamorgan in 5 first-class matches between 1922 and 1927, making his debut against Leicestershire and playing his final first-class match against Leicestershire in 1927. In his 5 first-class matches he scored 33 runs at a batting average of 4.12 and took 3 wickets at a bowling average of 43.33.
