= Martin Roberts (designer) =

British designer (1943–2020)

Martin David Roberts
- Born: February 20, 1943; Wokingham, England
- Died: May 29, 2020 (aged 77)
- Education: Hornsey College of Art and Design; Central School of Art and Design
- Occupations: Retail designer, author, lecturer and President of Martin Roberts Design
- Spouse: Anne Roberts
- Website: www.mrobertsdesign.com

Martin David Roberts (20 February 1943 – 29 May 2020) was a retail design expert, author and lecturer, and chief executive of Connecticut-based Martin Roberts Design.

== Early life and education ==
Martin David Roberts was born in Wokingham, England, the son of Gilbert Roberts and Hilda Bird. Roberts was educated at the Hornsey College of Art and Design and Central School of Art and Design, London. He had diplomas in Design for Technical Illustration, Industrial Design, and was awarded a Diploma and Membership (MSIA) in the Society of Industrial Artists and Designers, United Kingdom.

== Career ==
Roberts joined Terence Conran’s fledgling Conran Associates in 1965, where he created Conran’s Habitat Furniture and household products for the 20-store chain.

Roberts emigrated from the U.K. to the United States in 1975 and worked as Director of Design for Saxon Stores, Chicago thru 1979. He formed Industrial Design Consultancy in Chicago 1979-1981. In 1981, Roberts rejoined Terrance Conran as Director of Design, Conran Retail Stores of New York City, thru 1983. In 1984 Roberts joined Landor Associates as Vice President, New York thru 1993.

He founded, successively, International Design Group, GRID 2 International, and Martin Roberts Design, LLC. His client list includes Marriott, Chase Manhattan, Seagram's, Nestle, Timberland, UPS, Barnes & Noble, Furniture First, Morris Furniture, Swann's Furniture & Design, Belfort Furniture, Palliser Furniture, Circuit City, Waldenbooks, Samsonite, Thomasville Furniture, and the Museum of Modern Art, New York.

Roberts was President of Martin Robert, LLC, with offices in Stamford and New York City. He oversaw a team of strategic retail consultants and designers, and contributed his marketing and design expertise to every project.

His designs have been added to the permanent collections of the Museum of Modern Art, New York (1977), the London Science Museum (1975)and the Victoria and Albert Museum, London (1975). Roberts was a frequent lecturer on topics relating to retailing, branding and design.

== Death ==
Martin Roberts died on 29 May 2020 due to complications from surgery. He was 77. Roberts was survived by his wife, three children and four grandchildren.

== Affiliations ==
- Member, Society of Industrial Artists and Designers (M.S.I.A.D.), United Kingdom
- The Royal Society of Arts, London, England
- Society of Industrial Designers
- Institute of Store Planners

== Awards ==
Roberts’ numerous awards range from the 1964 Royal Society of Arts award for oil-burning appliances, thru the 2009 Interior Design Design Giant Award, and include the 1974 Design Council Award presented by Prince Philip, Duke of Edinburgh, the 2002 American Society of Furniture Designers’ ASFD Pinnacle Award, and the DDI Top One Hundred Design Company award.
