= Russell Green (cricketer) =

English cricketer

Personal information
- Full name: Russell Christopher Green
- Born: 30 July 1959 (age 67); St Albans, Hertfordshire, England
- Batting: Right-handed
- Bowling: Right-arm fast-medium

Domestic team information
- Years: Team
- 1987–1991: Minor Counties
- 1984: Glamorgan
- 1982–1991: Suffolk

Career statistics
Competition	First-class	List A
Matches	2	20
Runs scored	3	65
Batting average	–	13.00
100s/50s	–/–	–/–
Top score	3*	14
Balls bowled	191	1,110
Wickets	2	17
Bowling average	46.00	44.41
5 wickets in innings	–	–
10 wickets in match	–	–
Best bowling	2/65	3/44
Catches/stumpings	1/–	1/–
- Source: Cricinfo, 28 July 2011

Russell Christopher Green (born 30 July 1959) is a former English cricketer. Green was a right-handed batsman who bowled right-arm fast-medium. He was born in St Albans, Hertfordshire.

Green made his debut for Suffolk against Cambridgeshire in the 1982 Minor Counties Championship. He played Minor counties as a regular member of the Suffolk side, as well as making his List A debut against Derbyshire in the 1983 NatWest Trophy. After success in his early years with Suffolk, Russell was signed by Glamorgan in 1984, making two first-class appearances against Worcestershire and Cambridge University, as well as two List A appearances against Middlesex in the 1984 Benson & Hedges Cup and Worcestershire in the 1984 John Player Special League. His brief time with Glamorgan was without success and he subsequently returned to Suffolk.

He continued to play Minor counties cricket for Suffolk until 1991, in the process he made a total of 66 Minor Counties Championship appearances and 11 MCCA Knockout Trophy matches. He also went on to make a further six List A appearances for Suffolk, the last of which came against Worcestershire in the 1990 NatWest Trophy. He made a total of seven List A appearances for the county, taking six wickets at an average of 39.16, with best figures of 3/44. Playing for Suffolk also allowed him to play for the Minor Counties cricket team, who he made his List A debut for against Kent in the 1987 Benson & Hedges Cup. He made nine further List A appearances for the team, the last of which came against Hampshire in the 1991 Benson & Hedges Cup. In his 10 matches for the team, he took 10 wickets at an average of 47.10, with best figures of 3/67.
