= Stuart Phelps =

Welsh cricketer

Personal information
- Full name: Byron Stuart Phelps
- Born: 16 December 1975 (age 50); Neath, Glamorgan, Wales
- Batting: Right-handed
- Bowling: Slow left-arm orthodox

Domestic team information
- Years: Team
- 1993–1994: Glamorgan
- 1993: Wales Minor Counties

Career statistics
| Competition | FC |
|---|---|
| Matches | 3 |
| Runs scored | 18 |
| Batting average | 6.00 |
| 100s/50s | –/– |
| Top score | 11 |
| Balls bowled | 672 |
| Wickets | 5 |
| Bowling average | 72.60 |
| 5 wickets in innings | – |
| 10 wickets in match | – |
| Best bowling | 2/70 |
| Catches/stumpings | –/– |
- Source: Cricinfo, 1 July 2010

Byron Stuart Phelps (born 16 December 1975) is a former Welsh cricketer. Phelps was a right-handed batsman who bowled slow left-arm orthodox. He was born at Neath, Glamorgan.

Phelps played two Minor Counties Championship matches for the Wales Minor Counties in 1993, against Cheshire and Devon.

In the same season he made his first-class debut for Glamorgan against the touring Australians, during which he took the wicket of Damien Martyn. Phelps played two further first-class matches for Glamorgan, against Somerset and Middlesex, both of which came in 1994. In his brief first-class career, he took 5 wickets at an expensive bowling average of 72.60, with best figures of 2/70.
