= Derek Dauncey =

Derek Stephen Dauncey (born 2 September 1965) was the team manager for the Mitsubishi World Rally Team, a title he received in 2001. The team took one Constructors FIA World Rally Championship and four Drivers titles with the team's number one driver Tommi Makinen. Dauncey departed Mitsubishi in 2004. He now manages Ken Block's Hoonigan team Dauncey was born in Sutton Coldfield and attended Holland House and Riland Bedford Schools.
