= Kim Norkett =

Welsh cricketer

Personal information
- Full name: Kim Thomas Norkett
- Born: 24 December 1955 (age 70); RNH Mtarfa, Malta
- Batting: Right-handed
- Bowling: Right-arm fast-medium

Domestic team information
- Years: Team
- 1974: Glamorgan

Career statistics
Competition	List A
Matches	1
Runs scored	0
Batting average	0.0
100s/50s	0/0
Top score	0
Balls bowled	48
Wickets	1
Bowling average	34.00
5 wickets in innings	0
10 wickets in match	0
Best bowling	1/34
Catches/stumpings	0/–

Kim Thomas Norkett (born 24 December 1955) is a Welsh former cricketer and rugby player. Norkett was a right-handed batsman and right-arm fast bowler.

Educated at Monmouth School, Norkett impressed for the Welsh Schools representative side. He made his first and only List A appearance for Glamorgan against Hampshire at Basingstoke in 1974. In this match, Norkett failed to score any runs after being caught by Bob Stephenson. He claimed a single wicket, that of Gordon Greenidge, at the cost of 34 runs over 8 overs.

== Rugby ==
A scrum-half, Norkett captained Durham University RFC, Durham County and the English Universities side. He later played for Pontypool RFC and Ebbw Vale RFC.

In 1994, Norkett was falsely accused of a sex offence on a minor, which resulted in him losing his coaching job at Stonyhurst College. He was eventually cleared after a four-day trial.

In a coaching capacity, Norkett has worked with the Welsh women's national team and the Wales rugby sevens team.
