= Peter Crowther (cricketer) =

Welsh cricketer (born 1952)

Peter Gwynne Crowther (born 26 April 1952 in Neath) is a Welsh former cricketer active from 1977 to 1978 who played for Glamorgan. He appeared in nine first-class matches as a righthanded batsman who bowled off breaks. He scored 185 runs with a highest score of 99 and took one wicket with a best performance of one for 22.
