= Neil Perry (cricketer) =

English cricketer

Personal information
- Full name: Neil James Perry
- Born: 27 May 1958 (age 68); Sutton, Surrey, England
- Batting: Right-handed
- Bowling: Slow left-arm orthodox

Domestic team information
- Years: Team
- 1979–1981: Glamorgan

Career statistics
Competition	FC
Matches	13
Runs scored	19
Batting average	2.37
100s/50s	–/–
Top score	6
Balls bowled	1,695
Wickets	21
Bowling average	43.76
5 wickets in innings	–
10 wickets in match	–
Best bowling	3/51
Catches/stumpings	9/–
- Source: Cricinfo, 5 July 2010

Neil James Perry (born 27 May 1958) is a former English cricketer. Perry was a right-handed batsman who bowled slow left-arm orthodox. He was born at Sutton, Surrey.

Perry made his first-class debut for Glamorgan in 1979 against the touring Sri Lankans. From 1979 to 1981, he represented the county in 13 first-class matches, with his final first-class match coming against Worcestershire. In his first-class career, he took 21 wickets at a bowling average of 43.76, with best figures of 3/51. In the field he took 9 catches and with the bat he ended his first-class career with an unimpressive batting average of 2.37.
