= Theo Stewart =

Australian cricketer

Theophile Lecompte Stewart (9 May 1891 – 14 December 1952) was an Australian cricketer. He was a right-handed batsman who played one match for Glamorgan during the 1923 season. He was born in Brisbane and died in Morriston, Wales.

Stewart, a consistent club cricketer with Llanelli, and a scorer for the local Stradey Park club, made his first and only appearance for Glamorgan during the 1923 County Championship, nine years after appearing for Gentlemen of Glamorgan against Gentlemen of Carmarthen.

Glamorgan lost the match by five wickets, Stewart scoring four in the first innings and a duck in the second, being bowled out by James Horsley.
