= William Jones (cricketer, born 1911) =

Welsh cricketer

William Maxwell Jones (11 February 1911 – December 1941) was a Welsh cricketer active from 1933 to 1938 who played for Glamorgan. He was born in Alltwen and died in Denbigh. He appeared in eleven first-class matches as a righthanded batsman who bowled right arm medium pace. He scored 116 runs with a highest score of 51* and took six wickets with a best performance of three for 11.
