= Ginny Foat =

American politician

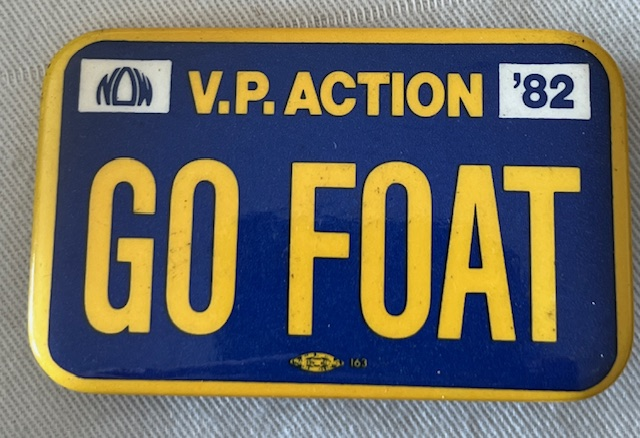
Button promoting the candidacy of Ginny Fort

Virginia "Ginny" Foat (born June 2, 1941) is an American politician who is a former member of the Palm Springs, California city council. She was active in the feminist movement in the 1970s.

== Personal life ==
Born to August ("Gus") and Virginia Galluzzo, Foat graduated from Grace Downs Academy and became a flight attendant. She married Danny Angelillo in 1961, but the marriage was annulled in 1963, at which time she learned that she was pregnant. She went to live at a home for unwed mothers, where she stayed until she had the baby, which was given up for adoption.

After her return home, she married bartender John "Jack" Sidote in 1965. In her 1985 autobiography, she describes enduring five years of domestic violence, receiving her first beating on their honeymoon. Sidote was eventually convicted of manslaughter in California in the 1967 slaying of Okeni Moe. She married Ray Foat in 1971.

In 1977, Foat was arrested after her former husband Sidote named her as an accomplice in a Nevada murder and the 1965 murder of New Orleans tourist Moises Chayo. She was released after three months when Sidote refused to testify against her in the Nevada case.

== Involvement with the National Organization for Women ==
Foat attended her first National Organization for Women meeting in 1974, and quickly moved up the ranks within the organization. She became the head of the California chapter of the organization.

Foat campaigned for the national vice presidency of NOW in 1982, but NOW member Shelly Mandell alerted Louisiana authorities of Foat's identity, and she was arrested and put on trial in 1983 in Gretna, Louisiana. Foat was acquitted, but the incident affected her political ambitions. Foat wrote an autobiography and worked for several political causes throughout the 1980s and 1990s. One of the most notable was the years she spent as the executive director of a nonprofit organization in Culver City, California, called Caring for Babies with AIDS. During that time she came out as lesbian.

== Social Justice work ==
In the 1970s, Foat campaigned against the Briggs Initiative in California.

== Political career ==
Foat was elected to fill an unexpired term on the Palm Springs City Council and served for 13 years.

== Bibliography ==
- Foat, Ginny (with Laura Foreman). Never Guilty, Never Free. Random House, 1985. ISBN 978-0-394-54141-9
- Hawkes, Ellen. Feminism on Trial: The Ginny Foat Case and the Future of the Women's Movement. William Morrow & Co, 1986. ISBN 978-0-688-04850-1
