= Haydn Davies (cricketer) =

Welsh cricketer

Personal information
- Full name: Haydn George Davies
- Born: 23 April 1912; Llanelli, Carmarthenshire, Wales
- Died: 4 September 1993 (aged 81); Haverfordwest, Pembrokeshire, Wales
- Batting: Right-handed
- Role: Wicketkeeper
- Relatives: Roy Davies (brother), Andrew Davies (nephew)

Domestic team information
- Years: Team
- 1947–1948: Marylebone Cricket Club
- 1935–1958: Glamorgan

Career statistics
Competition	FC
Matches	427
Runs scored	6,615
Batting average	13.07
100s/50s	–/12
Top score	80
Balls bowled	18
Wickets	1
Bowling average	20.00
5 wickets in innings	–
10 wickets in match	–
Best bowling	1/20
Catches/stumpings	583/205
- Source: Cricinfo, 3 July 2010

Haydn George Davies (23 April 1912 – 4 September 1993) was a Welsh-born cricketer for Glamorgan County Cricket Club.

Davies is regarded as being one of the best wicketkeepers to have played for Glamorgan, taking 789 dismissals from his 423 first class games between 1935 and 1958. With 82 victims in 1955, he set a new record for the county. He took eight dismissals in a match against the South African touring team in 1955.

He was selected for a Test trial in 1946, but was kept out of the English side by Godfrey Evans.
