= Ernie Moss (cricketer) =

Welsh cricketer (1892–1934)

Samuel Ernest Moss (25 November 1892 – 1934) was a Welsh cricketer active in 1923 who played for Glamorgan. He was born in Mountain Ash and died in Manchester. He appeared in one first-class match as a righthanded batsman who bowled right arm fast. He scored 15 runs with a highest score of 10 and took two wickets with a best performance of two for 70.
