= Kenny Francis (cricketer) =

Kittitian cricketer (born 1950)

Personal information
- Full name: Kenneth McKoy Valentine Francis
- Born: 14 March 1950 (age 76); Saint Kitts
- Batting: Right-handed
- Bowling: Right-arm fast-medium
- Role: Bowler

Domestic team information
- Years: Team
- 1972–1975: Glamorgan
- 1975–1977: Worcestershire
- Only List A: 17 June 1973 Glamorgan v Surrey

Career statistics
Competition	LA
Matches	1
Runs scored	0
Batting average	–
100s/50s	–/–
Top score	0*
Balls bowled	48
Wickets	1
Bowling average	25.00
5 wickets in innings	–
10 wickets in match	–
Best bowling	1/25
Catches/stumpings	1/–
- Source: CricketArchive, 26 April 2015

Kenneth McKoy Valentine "Kenny" Francis (born 14 March 1950) is a former cricketer from Saint Kitts. He played in one List A match for Glamorgan in 1973 against Surrey at Sophia Gardens in Cardiff. A right-arm fast-medium bowler, Francis took a single wicket in the 48 balls of his first-class career. He also played 26 Second XI matches for Glamorgan and – following a move to the West Midlands in 1975 – Worcestershire. He also featured for the Glamorgan Under-25s, Worcestershire Under-25s and Worcestershire Club and Ground XI, and played league cricket in South Wales.
