= Alastair Dalton =

Welsh cricketer

Personal information
- Full name: Alistair John Dalton
- Born: 27 April 1973 (age 53); Bridgend, Glamorgan, Wales
- Batting: Right-handed
- Bowling: Right-arm medium

Domestic team information
- Years: Team
- 1994–1996: Glamorgan
- 1992–1997: Wales Minor Counties

Career statistics
| Competition | FC | LA |
|---|---|---|
| Matches | 13 | 2 |
| Runs scored | 426 | 25 |
| Batting average | 21.30 | 12.50 |
| 100s/50s | –/1 | –/– |
| Top score | 51* | 19 |
| Balls bowled | – | – |
| Wickets | – | – |
| Bowling average | – | – |
| 5 wickets in innings | – | – |
| 10 wickets in match | – | – |
| Best bowling | – | – |
| Catches/stumpings | 9/– | –/– |
- Source: Cricinfo, 4 July 2010

Alistair John Dalton (born 27 April 1973) is a former Welsh cricketer. Dalton was a right-handed batsman who bowled right-arm medium pace. He was born at Bridgend, Glamorgan. He was educated at Millfield School.

Dalton made his debut in county cricket for Wales Minor Counties in the 1992 Minor Counties Championship against Wiltshire. From 1992 to 1997, he represented the team in six Minor Counties fixtures, with his final appearance for the team coming against Cheshire.

In 1994, Dalton made his first-class debut for Glamorgan against Oxford University. From 1994 to 1996, he represented the county in 13 first-class matches, with his final first-class match coming against the touring Pakistanis. In his first-class career, he scored 426 runs at a batting average of 21.30 and a single half century high score of 51*. In the field he took 9 catches.

In addition to playing first-class cricket for Glamorgan, he also represented the county in 2 List-A matches in 1996 against Hampshire and Surrey.

After leaving Glamorgan at the end of the 1996 season, he had an unsuccessful trial period with Worcestershire before pursuing a career as a professional pilot.
