= Bill Watkins (cricketer, born 1923) =

Welsh cricketer and World War II aviator

Personal information
- Full name: William Martin Watkins
- Born: 18 January 1923; Swansea, Glamorgan, Wales
- Died: 15 March 2005 (aged 82); Killay, Glamorgan, Wales
- Batting: Right-handed
- Bowling: Right-arm leg break googly

Domestic team information
- Years: Team
- 1950: Glamorgan

Career statistics
Competition	FC
Matches	1
Runs scored	3
Batting average	3.00
100s/50s	–/–
Top score	3
Balls bowled	–
Wickets	–
Bowling average	–
5 wickets in innings	–
10 wickets in match	–
Best bowling	–
Catches/stumpings	–/–
- Source: Cricinfo, 1 July 2010

Bill Watkins DFC (18 January 1923 – 15 March 2005) was a Welsh cricketer and decorated World War II aviator. Watkins was a right-handed batsman who bowled right-arm leg break googly. He was born at Swansea, Glamorgan.

== World War II service ==
Watkins served in the Royal Air Force during the Second World War, enlisting when he was 18 in 1941 and serving with 514 Squadron at Waterbeach, Cambridgeshire. During the course of the war he took part in 31 missions over Germany in his Lancaster bomber, earning him by war's end the Distinguished Flying Cross.

== Post World War II service ==
Following the end of the war, Watkins left the Royal Air Force and returned to his native Swansea, where he worked as a metallurgist for British Aluminium and ALCOA. Watkins played a single first-class match for Glamorgan in 1950 against Hampshire at St. Helen's. A keen sportsman, he also had trials with the rugby league club Wigan.

Watkins died at Killay, Glamorgan on 15 March 2005.
