= Willie Whitehill =

Welsh cricketer

Personal information
- Full name: William Kenneth Whitehill
- Born: 13 June 1934 (age 92); Newport, Monmouthshire
- Batting: Right-handed
- Role: Wicketkeeper

Domestic team information
- Years: Team
- 1960: Glamorgan

Career statistics
Competition	FC
Matches	7
Runs scored	60
Batting average	7.50
100s/50s	–/–
Top score	16
Balls bowled	–
Wickets	–
Bowling average	–
5 wickets in innings	–
10 wickets in match	–
Best bowling	–
Catches/stumpings	8/–
- Source: Cricinfo, 13 September 2010

William Kenneth Whitehill (born 13 June 1934) is a former Welsh cricketer. Whitehill was a right-handed batsman who played primarily as a wicketkeeper. He was born at Newport, Monmouthshire.

In 1960, Whitehill played his first first-class match for Glamorgan against Worcestershire at the County Championship. During the 1960 season, he played 7 first-class matches, the last of which for Glamorgan came against Lancashire at Cardiff Arms Park.

Between 1959 and 1964, he also represented the Glamorgan Second XI in the Second XI Championship 12 times.
