= David Harrison (cricketer) =

Welsh cricketer

Personal information
- Full name: David Stuart Harrison
- Born: 30 July 1981 (age 45); Monmouthshire, Wales
- Nickname: Desmond
- Height: 6 ft 4 in (1.93 m)
- Batting: Right-handed
- Bowling: Right-arm fast-medium
- Role: Bowler
- Relatives: Stuart Harrison (father); Adam Harrison (brother)

Domestic team information
- Years: Team
- 1999–2011: Glamorgan (squad no. 20)
- 2005: MCC
- FC debut: 20 April 1999 Glamorgan v Derbyshire
- LA debut: 6 August 2000 Glamorgan v Durham

Career statistics
Competition	FC	LA	T20
Matches	90	77	25
Runs scored	1,764	406	12
Batting average	16.80	13.09	2.40
100s/50s	0/7	0/0	0/0
Top score	88	37*	4*
Balls bowled	14,064	3,225	441
Wickets	220	89	19
Bowling average	36.90	29.00	34.00
5 wickets in innings	6	2	0
10 wickets in match	0	0	0
Best bowling	5/48	5/26	2/17
Catches/stumpings	28/–	8/–	4/–
- Source: ESPNcricinfo, 9 August 2009

David Stuart Harrison (born 30 July 1981) is a Welsh cricketer who has played for the England A team. He is a right-handed batsman and a right-arm medium-fast bowler.

David Harrison's father, Stuart and brother Adam also play cricket. Harrison appeared in 1999/2000 for England in the World Youth Cup and played in Second XI cricket in 2001 and 2002, before being promoted to the county side's first XI in August 2002.
