= Tyrone Powell =

Welsh cricketer

Personal information
- Full name: Tyrone Lyndon Powell
- Born: 17 June 1953 (age 73); Bargoed, Glamorgan, Wales
- Batting: Right-handed
- Bowling: Right-arm off break

Domestic team information
- Years: Team
- 1982–1985: Norfolk
- 1976: Glamorgan

Career statistics
Competition	FC
Matches	2
Runs scored	24
Batting average	6.00
100s/50s	–/–
Top score	14
Balls bowled	–
Wickets	–
Bowling average	–
5 wickets in innings	–
10 wickets in match	–
Best bowling	–
Catches/stumpings	–/–
- Source: Cricinfo, 1 July 2010

Tyrone Lyndon Powell (born 17 June 1953) is a former Welsh cricketer. Powell was a right-handed batsman who bowled right-arm off break. He was born at Bargoed, Glamorgan.

It can be assumed Powell spent part of his life living in New Zealand, as his first-class debut came for New Zealand Under-23s against Otago in 1972. Powell played no further first-class matches in New Zealand.

In 1976 he played a single first-class match for Glamorgan against the touring West Indians, making a duck in both innings, being dismissed by Wayne Daniel in the first innings and Michael Holding in the Glamorgan second innings.

Powell also played Minor Counties Championship cricket for Norfolk from 1982 to 1985, with his first match for the county coming against Hertfordshire and playing his final Minor Counties match for the county against Suffolk.
