= Niel Morgan =

Welsh cricketer and diplomat

Personal information
- Full name: Aubrey Niel Morgan
- Born: 30 January 1904; Cyncoed, Cardiff, Wales
- Died: 14 September 1985 (aged 81); Ridgefield, Washington, United States
- Batting: Right-handed
- Bowling: Right-arm medium-fast
- Relatives: Trevil Morgan (brother)

Domestic team information
- Years: Team
- 1928 to 1929: Glamorgan

Career statistics
Competition	FC
Matches	6
Runs scored	95
Batting average	8.63
100s/50s	–/–
Top score	35
Balls bowled	528
Wickets	6
Bowling average	56.00
5 wickets in innings	–
10 wickets in match	–
Best bowling	2/37
Catches/stumpings	1/–
- Source: Cricinfo, 4 July 2010

Aubrey Niel Morgan CMG (30 January 1904 – 14 September 1985) was a Welsh diplomat and amateur cricketer.

== Early life and cricket career ==
Morgan was born at Cyncoed, Glamorgan, and educated at Charterhouse School and Jesus College, Cambridge. A right-handed batsman who bowled right-arm medium-fast, he made his first-class debut for Glamorgan in 1928 against Oxford University. He played four further first-class matches for the county in 1928 and 1929. His final first-class appearance came for Wales against the Marylebone Cricket Club at Lord's in 1929. In his first-class career he scored 95 runs at a batting average of 8.36, with a highest score of 35. With the ball he took six wickets at a bowling average of 56.00, with best figures of 2/37.

His younger brother, Trevil, also played first-class cricket for Glamorgan and Wales, as well as Cambridge University.

== Diplomatic career ==
After working at his family's department store, David Morgan in Cardiff, Niel Morgan went on to become a British diplomat, patron of the arts, and brother-in-law of the US aviator Charles Lindbergh, through his marriages to Elisabeth and Constance Morrow, the sisters of Lindbergh's wife Anne Morrow Lindbergh. He was controller of British Information Services in the United States during World War II. After the war he was Personal Adviser to Lord Franks, the British ambassador to the US, work for which he was awarded the CMG.

Morgan died of heart failure on 14 September 1985, at the age of 81, at his farm in Ridgefield, Washington, USA. He was survived by his wife, Constance Morrow Morgan. They married in 1937 and had a son and three daughters. His first wife, Constance's elder sister Elisabeth, died in 1934.
