= Phil North =

Welsh cricketer (born 1965)

Personal information
- Full name: Philip David North
- Born: 15 June 1965 (age 61); Newport, Monmouthshire, Wales
- Batting: Right-handed
- Bowling: Slow left-arm orthodox

Domestic team information
- Years: Team
- 1997: Wales Minor Counties
- 1993–1994: Wiltshire
- 1990: Wales Minor Counties
- 1985–1989: Glamorgan

Career statistics
Competition	FC	LA
Matches	22	4
Runs scored	200	0
Batting average	11.11	0.00
100s/50s	–/–	–/–
Top score	41*	0
Balls bowled	2,475	210
Wickets	24	6
Bowling average	42.04	24.16
5 wickets in innings	–	–
10 wickets in match	–	–
Best bowling	4/43	3/20
Catches/stumpings	7/–	–/–
- Source: Cricinfo, 11 October 2010

Philip David North (born 16 May 1965) is a former Welsh cricketer. North was a right-handed batsman who bowled slow left-arm orthodox. He was born at Newport, Monmouthshire.

North made his County Championship debut for Glamorgan in 1985 against Yorkshire. From 1985 to 1989, he represented the county in 22 first-class matches, the last of which came against Gloucestershire in the 1989 County Championship. In his 22 first-class matches, he scored 200 runs at a batting average of 11.11, with a high score of 41*. In the field he took 7 catches. With the ball, North took 24 wickets at a bowling average of 42.04, with best figures of 4/43.

North also made his debut in List A cricket for Glamorgan. His debut List A match came against Essex in 1987, with North playing 2 further List A matches for Glamorgan against Gloucestershire and Northamptonshire.

Following his departure from Glamorgan at the end of the 1989 season, North played for Wales Minor Counties, where he represented the team in 2 Minor Counties Championship matches against Buckinghamshire and Oxfordshire, as well as a single MCCA Knockout Trophy match for them against Oxfordshire.

North moved to Wiltshire in 1993, making his Minor Counties Championship debut for the county against Devon. From 1993 to 1994, he represented the county in 13 Minor Counties Championship matches, the last of which came against Oxfordshire. North also represented Wiltshire in the MCCA Knockout Trophy. His debut in that competition for the county came against Cornwall. From 1993 to 1994, he represented the county in 5 Trophy matches, the last of which came against Devon. He also represented Wiltshire in a single List A match against Durham in the 1993 NatWest Trophy. In his combined List A matches, he took 6 wickets at an average of 24.16, with best figures of 3/20.

In 1997, North returned to play Minor Counties cricket for Wales Minor Counties. During the 1997 season, he represented the team in 9 Minor Counties Championship matches, the last of which came against Berkshire. He also played a single MCCA Knockout Trophy match in 1997 against Devon.

North almost made a return to first-class cricket in 1997, when he travelled up to Colwyn Bay as part of the Glamorgan squad. After travelling up to North Wales, North overslept the next morning and missed out on an opportunity to re-appear in County Championship cricket.
