= Martin Roberts (cricketer) =

Welsh cricketer (born 1966)

Martin Leonard Roberts (born 12 April 1966 in Mullion, Cornwall) is an English former cricketer active from 1983 to 1994 who played for Glamorgan. He appeared in ten first-class matches as a righthanded batsman and wicket-keeper. He scored 100 runs with a highest score of 25 and completed sixteen catches with four stumpings.
