= Gilbert Dauncey =

Welsh cricketer (1936–2021)

John Gilbert Dauncey (9 April 1936 – 11 October 2021) Welsh cricketer. He was a right-handed batsman who played for Glamorgan. He was born in Ystalyfera, in Glamorgan.

Dauncey played league cricket for Swansea, Metal Box, Pontardawe, Clydach and Mumbles. He made two first-class appearances for Glamorgan, during the 1957 season, having represented the Second XI since 1954. From the opening order, Dauncey scored his first-class best total of 34 in his debut innings, against Gloucestershire. His second and final first-class appearance came immediately afterwards, against Kent.

Dauncey died on 11 October 2021, at the age of 85.
