= George Shaw (cricketer, born 1931) =

Welsh cricketer

Personal information
- Full name: George Bernard Shaw
- Born: 24 October 1931; Treharris, Glamorgan, Wales
- Died: 2 August 1984 (aged 52); Port Pirie, South Australia, Australia
- Batting: Right-handed
- Bowling: Right-arm off break

Domestic team information
- Years: Team
- 1951–1955: Glamorgan

Career statistics
Competition	First-class
Matches	16
Runs scored	30
Batting average	4.28
100s/50s	–/–
Top score	11
Balls bowled	1376
Wickets	26
Bowling average	27.15
5 wickets in innings	2
10 wickets in match	1
Best bowling	5/38
Catches/stumpings	4/–
- Source: Cricinfo, 24 July 2011

George Bernard Shaw (24 October 1931 – 2 August 1984) was a Welsh cricketer. Shaw was a right-handed batsman who bowled right-arm off break. He was born in Treharris, Glamorgan.

Shaw made his first-class debut for Glamorgan against the Combined Services in 1951. He made 15 further first-class appearances for Glamorgan, the last of which came against Surrey in the 1955 County Championship. A bowler, Shaw took 26 wickets for Glamorgan, at an average of 27.15, with best figures of 5/38. These figures came in his second first-class match against the Combined Services in 1952, a match in which he also took his other five-wicket haul of 5/67, to give him match figures of 10/105. Typically though, he found it harder against county professionals.

He emigrated to Australia in 1978, where six years later he was killed in a car crash outside Port Pirie, South Australia, on 2 August 1984.
