= John Hinwood =

English cricketer

John Hinwood (8 April 1894 – 14 May 1971) was an English cricketer. He was a right-handed batsman and a right-arm medium-fast bowler who played for Glamorgan. He was born in Wilton and died in Swansea.

Hinwood played league cricket for Clydach, Llanelli and Swansea, the latter of whom he occasionally captained. However, he made just one first-class appearance for Glamorgan, and was unfortunate to score a pair in the two innings in which he batted, against Northamptonshire in 1923.
