= Steve Bastien (cricketer) =

English cricketer (born 1963)

Personal information
- Full name: Steven Bastien
- Born: 13 March 1963 (age 63); Stepney, London, England
- Batting: Right-handed
- Bowling: Right-arm medium-fast

Domestic team information
- Years: Team
- 1988–1994: Glamorgan

Career statistics
| Competition | First-class | List A |
|---|---|---|
| Matches | 54 | 19 |
| Runs scored | 182 | 18 |
| Batting average | 7.91 | 9.00 |
| 100s/50s | 0/0 | 0/0 |
| Top score | 36* | 7* |
| Balls bowled | 8,894 | 786 |
| Wickets | 123 | 8 |
| Bowling average | 37.98 | 70.75 |
| 5 wickets in innings | 7 | 0 |
| 10 wickets in match | 1 | 0 |
| Best bowling | 6/52 | 2/42 |
| Catches/stumpings | 7/– | 1/– |
- Source: Cricinfo, 28 October 2012

Steven Bastien (born 13 March 1963) is a former English cricketer. Bastien was a right-handed batsman who bowled right-arm medium-fast and played as a swing bowler for Glamorgan County Cricket Club between 1988 and 1994. He was born at Stepney in London in 1963 and played cricket in Dominica before completing his education at Haringey College in London.
