= Leslie Harris (Welsh cricketer) =

Welsh cricketer

Leslie John Harris (20 July 1915 – 28 October 1985) was a Welsh cricketer active from 1947 to 1948 who played for Glamorgan. He was born in Cardiff and died in Beckenham, Kent. He appeared in three first-class matches as a righthanded batsman who bowled right arm medium pace. He scored seven runs and took five wickets with a best performance of three for 39.
