= Wat Jones =

Welsh cricketer

Personal information
- Full name: Watkin Edward Jones
- Born: 6 July 1917; Gwaun-cae-Gurwen, Glamorgan, Wales
- Died: 23 August 1994 (aged 77); Morriston, Glamorgan, Wales
- Batting: Right-handed
- Bowling: Right-arm fast-medium

Domestic team information
- Years: Team
- 1946-1947: Glamorgan

Career statistics
Competition	FC
Matches	5
Runs scored	0
Batting average	0.00
100s/50s	–/–
Top score	0
Balls bowled	564
Wickets	13
Bowling average	26.30
5 wickets in innings	1
10 wickets in match	–
Best bowling	7/92
Catches/stumpings	1/–
- Source: Cricinfo, 14 September 2010

Watkin Edward Jones (6 July 1917 – 23 August 1994) was a Welsh cricketer. Jones was a right-handed batsman who bowled right-arm fast-medium. He was born at Gwaun-cae-Gurwen, Glamorgan.

Jones made his first-class debut for Glamorgan against Lancashire in the 1946 County Championship. From 1947 to 1947, he played 4 further first-class matches for Glamorgan, playing his last first-class match against Sussex at Cardiff Arms Park. In his 5 first-class matches, he took 13 wickets at a bowling average of 26.30, with best figures of 7/92 against Kent.

Jones' day job as a police officer prevented him from playing more often. Jones died on 23 August 1994 at Morriston, Glamorgan.
