= Mark Davies (cricketer, born 1959) =

Welsh cricketer

Personal information
- Full name: Mark Nicholas Davies
- Born: 28 December 1959 (age 66); Maesteg, Glamorgan, Wales
- Batting: Left-handed
- Bowling: Right-arm off break

Domestic team information
- Years: Team
- 1982: Glamorgan

Career statistics
Competition	First-class
Matches	2
Runs scored	0
Batting average	0.00
100s/50s	–/–
Top score	0
Balls bowled	–
Wickets	–
Bowling average	–
5 wickets in innings	–
10 wickets in match	–
Best bowling	–
Catches/stumpings	1/–
- Source: Cricinfo, 27 April 2013

Mark Nicholas Davies (born 28 December 1959) is a former Welsh cricketer. Davies was a left-handed batsman who bowled occasional right-arm off break. He was born at Maesteg, Glamorgan.

Davies made his first-class debut for Glamorgan against Oxford University in 1982 at St. Helen's following a good record in club cricket with Maesteg Celtic and for the Glamorgan Second XI. He played forty-seven games for the Glamorgan Second XI, as well as nine invitational First XI and Second XI matches, and sixteen games for Under-25 team.

Batting once during his debut first-class match, Davies was dismissed for a duck, in what was to be his only innings at first-class level, by Timothy Taylor. He made a second first-class appearance in that season's County Championship against Worcestershire at Sophia Gardens, with the match largely washed out by rain.
