= Mark Davies (cricketer, born 1969) =

Welsh cricketer

Personal information
- Full name: Mark Davies
- Born: 18 April 1969 (age 57); Neath, Glamorgan, Wales
- Batting: Right-handed
- Bowling: Slow left-arm orthodox

Domestic team information
- Years: Team
- 1996–2001: Wales Minor Counties
- 1992–1995: Gloucestershire
- 1990: Glamorgan

Career statistics
Competition	First-class	List A
Matches	45	24
Runs scored	632	136
Batting average	15.04	15.11
100s/50s	–/1	–/–
Top score	54	30*
Balls bowled	7,997	836
Wickets	110	18
Bowling average	35.25	36.05
5 wickets in innings	3	–
10 wickets in match	1	–
Best bowling	5/57	2/23
Catches/stumpings	19/–	4/–
- Source: Cricinfo, 9 July 2011

Mark Davies (born 18 April 1969) is a former Welsh cricketer. Davies was a right-handed batsman who bowled slow left-arm orthodox. He was born in Neath, Glamorgan.

Having spent time on the MCC staff and played Second XI cricket for the Glamorgan Second XI since 1987, Davies made a single first-class appearance for Glamorgan against Oxford University at the University Parks in 1990. In this match he scored 5 unbeaten runs, while with the ball he bowled 8 wicket-less overs. He joined Gloucestershire in 1992, making his first-class debut for the county in the County Championship against Yorkshire. He made 43 further first-class appearances for Gloucestershire, the last of which came against Yorkshire in the 1995 County Championship. In his 44 first-class appearances for the county, he scored 627 runs at an average of 14.92, with a high score of 54. This score, his only first-class half century, came against Nottinghamshire in the 1994 County Championship. As a bowler, Davies took 110 wickets at a respectable bowling average of 35.10. He took 3 five wicket hauls and one ten wicket haul in a match during his career, with his best bowling figures coming against Northamptonshire in the 1993 County Championship. For much of his time at Gloucestershire, Davies found opportunities limited. Only in 2 seasons did his wicket tally reach double figures, which happened to be when he made his most appearances for Gloucestershire: he took 56 wickets in 1992 and 37 in 1993.

It was for Gloucestershire that he made his List A debut for against Somerset in the 1992 Sunday League. He made 16 further List A appearances for the county, the last of which came against Hampshire in the 1995 AXA Equity & Law League. He scored 66 runs in his 17 appearances, which came at an average of 11.00, with a high score of 14. With the ball he took 12 wickets at an average of 36.66, with best figures of 2/23. With opportunities limited, he left Gloucestershire at the end of the 1995 season.

He joined Wales Minor Counties in 1996, making his debut for the team in the MCCA Knockout Trophy against Cornwall. He played Minor counties cricket for Wales Minor Counties from 1996 to 2001, making 10 Minor Counties Championship appearances and 6 MCCA Knockout Trophy appearances. He made his first List A appearance for Wales Minor Counties against Nottinghamshire in the 1998 NatWest Trophy. He made 6 further List A appearances for the team, the last of which came against the Somerset Cricket Board in the 2001 Cheltenham & Gloucester Trophy. In his 7 List A matches for the team, he scored 70 runs at an average of 23.33, with a high score of 30 not out. With the ball, he took 6 wickets at an average of 34.83, with best figures of 2/34.
