= Sam Kirnon =

English cricketer

Samuel Kirnon (born 25 December 1962) is an English former cricketer now cricket coach. He was a right-handed batsman and right-arm medium-fast bowler who played for Glamorgan.

Kirnon was born in Preston but spent his childhood in Montserrat, and later joined the British Army. He was given a trial by Glamorgan on the basis of good performances for German cricket club Dortmund.

He made a single first-class appearance for the team, during the 1992 season, against Oxford University. He did not bat in the match, but bowled 14 overs, taking the wicket of Jason Gallian.

Kirnon made two List A appearances for the team between 1991 and 1992, scoring a single run and taking two wickets.

Since his playing career Kirnon has coached in Dominica and is running the cricket academy on the island, he has helped in the development of players including Alick Athanaze.
