= Andy Mack =

English cricketer

Personal information
- Full name: Andrew James Mack
- Born: 14 January 1956 (age 70); Aylsham, Norfolk, England
- Batting: Left-handed
- Bowling: Left-arm medium

Domestic team information
- Years: Team
- 1990–1991: Minor Counties
- 1989–1991: Norfolk
- 1978–1980: Glamorgan
- 1975–1977: Surrey

Career statistics
Competition	First-class	List A
Matches	31	65
Runs scored	102	48
Batting average	4.63	4.00
100s/50s	–/–	–/–
Top score	18	16
Balls bowled	3,271	2,912
Wickets	44	57
Bowling average	42.93	38.14
5 wickets in innings	–	–
10 wickets in match	–	–
Best bowling	4/28	3/24
Catches/stumpings	4/–	8/–
- Source: Cricinfo, 28 October 2012

Andrew James Mack (born 14 January 1956) is a former English cricketer. Mack was a left-handed batsman who bowled left-arm medium pace. He was born at Aylsham, Norfolk.
