= Jim Foat =

English cricketer (born 1952)

James Foat
Personal information
- Full name: James Clive Foat
- Born: 21 November 1952 (age 73); Salford Priors, Warwickshire, England
- Batting: Right-handed
- Bowling: Right-arm medium
- Role: Batsman

Domestic team information
- Years: Team
- 1972–1979: Gloucestershire

Career statistics
Competition	First-class	List A
Matches	91	129
Runs scored	2,512	1,352
Batting average	18.60	15.19
100s/50s	5/6	0/3
Top score	126	73*
Catches/stumpings	39/–	35/–
- Source: Cricinfo, 30 July 2013

James Clive Foat (born 21 November 1952) is a former English cricketer. He played for Gloucestershire County Cricket Club between 1972 and 1979.

Foat has a cult following, described as "a throwback to an earlier time when low batting averages were more commonplace ... an average batsman who compensated by being a superb fielder in the covers." Foat thought of himself as "...a bits-and-pieces player. What bailed me out was my fielding, so I always got picked as 12th man, or I'd play in the one-dayers. I felt I could bat but I never quite made it."
