= Maurice Robinson (cricketer) =

Irish cricketer

Maurice Robinson (16 July 1921 – 8 August 1994) was an Irish cricketer active from 1942 to 1954 who played for Glamorgan and Warwickshire. He was born in Lisburn and died in Bromsgrove. He appeared in 83 first-class matches as a righthanded batsman who bowled right arm fast medium. He scored 2,719 runs with a highest score of 190 among two centuries and took 34 wickets with a best performance of seven for 51. During the Second World War, he was stationed in India where he represented the Europeans cricket team and played for both Hyderabad and Madras.

In 1947, Maurice Robinson and his wife, Cecily, opened a sports shop on York Road in Kings Heath.
