= Trevor Arnott =

Welsh cricketer

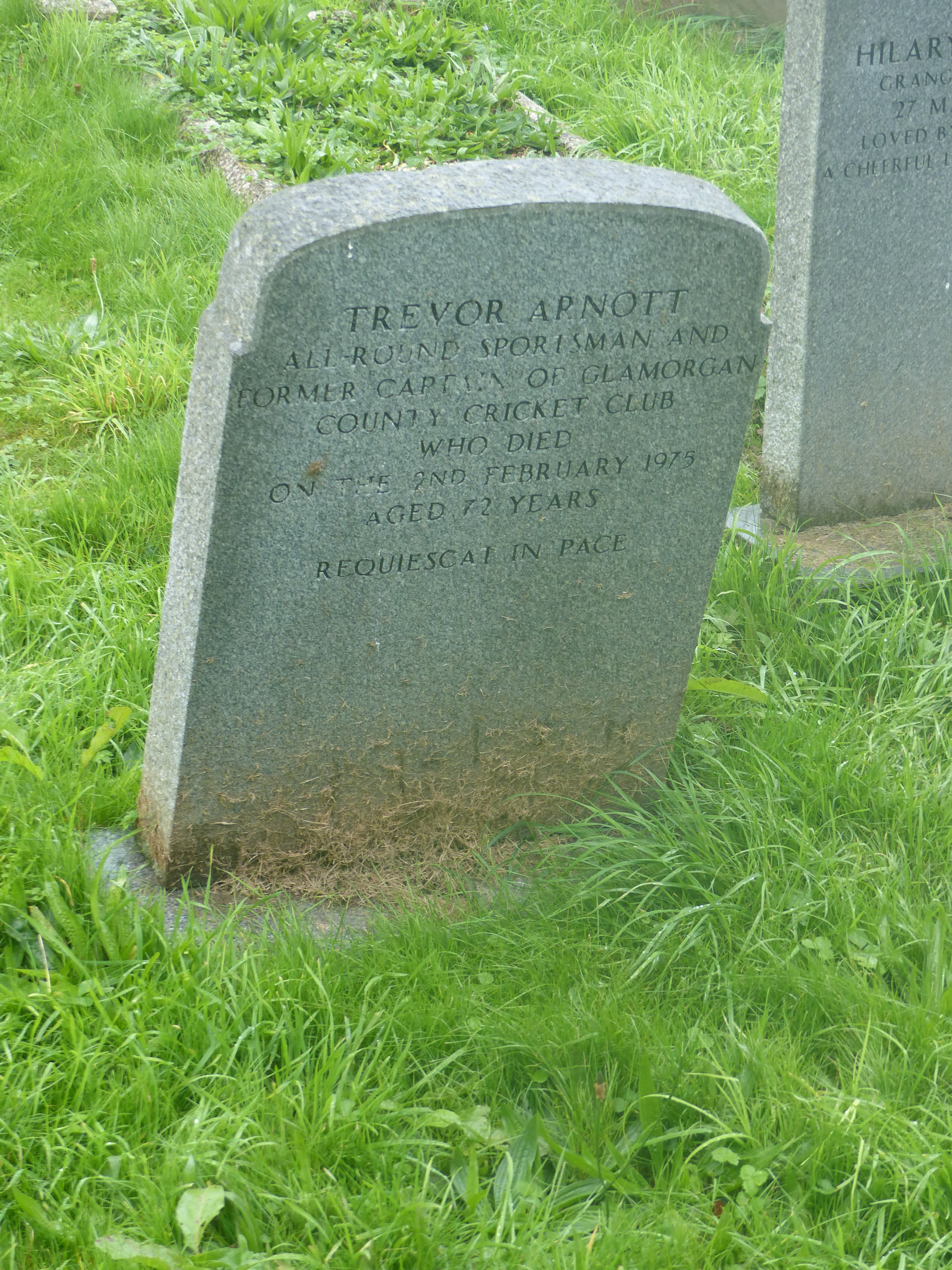
- Grave at St Peter's Church, Dixton

Personal information
- Full name: Trevor Arnott
- Born: 16 February 1902; Radyr, Glamorgan, Wales
- Died: 2 February 1975 (aged 72); Wilton, Herefordshire, England
- Batting: Right-handed
- Bowling: Right-arm fast-medium

Domestic team information
- Years: Team
- 1931–1934: Monmouthshire
- 1931–1934/35: Marylebone Cricket Club
- 1924–1930: Wales
- 1921–1930: Glamorgan

Career statistics
Competition	First-class
Matches	216
Runs scored	5,791
Batting average	17.03
100s/50s	3/22
Top score	153
Balls bowled	25,844
Wickets	408
Bowling average	33.11
5 wickets in innings	10
10 wickets in match	–
Best bowling	7/40
Catches/stumpings	103/–
- Source: Cricinfo, 28 October 2012

Trevor Arnott (16 February 1902 – 2 February 1975) was a Welsh cricketer who played first-class cricket as an amateur from 1921 to 1935.

Arnott was a right-handed batsman who bowled right-arm fast-medium. He was born at Radyr, Glamorgan, and attended Monmouth School. He captained Glamorgan County Cricket Club in 1928, but was not successful, the county winning only two of their 26 County Championship matches amid disharmony on and off the field.

During the 1928 season he hit his highest score, 153 against Essex. He took his best bowling figures of 7 for 40 when Glamorgan beat the West Indian touring team in 1923. He toured Jamaica with Lord Tennyson's team in 1926–27 and 1927–28.

He is buried is in the churchyard at St Peter's Church, Dixton.
