= Fred Barratt =

English cricketer (1894–1947)

Personal information
- Full name: Fred Barratt
- Born: 12 April 1894; Annesley, Nottinghamshire, England
- Died: 29 January 1947 (aged 52); Nottingham, England
- Batting: Right-handed
- Bowling: Right-arm fast
- Role: All-rounder

International information
- National side: England
- Test debut (cap 243): 27 July 1929 v South Africa
- Last Test: 24 February 1930 v New Zealand

Domestic team information
- Years: Team
- 1914–1931: Nottinghamshire

Career statistics
Competition	Test	First-class
Matches	5	371
Runs scored	28	6,445
Batting average	9.33	15.53
100s/50s	0/0	2/24
Top score	17	139*
Balls bowled	750	64,761
Wickets	5	1,224
Bowling average	47.00	22.72
5 wickets in innings	0	69
10 wickets in match	0	11
Best bowling	1/8	8/26
Catches/stumpings	2/–	175/–
- Source: CricketArchive, 19 December 2008

Fred Barratt (12 April 1894 – 29 January 1947) played first-class cricket for Nottinghamshire County Cricket Club from 1914 to 1931 and represented England in five Test matches, one in the home series against South Africa in 1929 and four on the inaugural Test series against New Zealand in the 1929–30 season. He was born in Annesley, Nottinghamshire and died at Nottingham General Hospital, Nottingham.

From a mining background, Barratt was a right-arm fast bowler who, according to Wisden, combined "swerve with his pace". He was also a right-handed lower-order batsman whose batting was always forthright, but became suddenly quite proficient from 1928 onwards.

== Early career ==
His debut in first-class cricket was sensational. Picked for Nottinghamshire to play against Marylebone Cricket Club (MCC) in one of the set-piece season-openers at Lord's in 1914, he took eight wickets for 91 runs in the first innings. He followed that with five for 58 in his first County Championship match. And by the end of his first season he had amassed 115 first-class wickets at an average of 21.80, including 10 instances of five wickets or more in an innings and three of 10 or more in a match. Against Leicestershire at Trent Bridge late in the season, he took eight for 75 in an innings, improving on his debut figures.

Barratt then lost the next four years of his cricket career to the First World War and when it resumed in 1919, according to his obituary in Wisden, "he was slow in finding his old form". He took 58 wickets in the limited 1919 fixtures, 68 in 1920 and 91 in 1921. Though his batting average across these seasons and beyond was low – he managed 16 runs per innings in 1919, but did not approach that again until the late 1920s – there were individual innings of power and brilliance. Against Sussex in 1919, he made 82 while batting at No 9, with his partners in ninth and tenth wicket partnerships contributing only 11 out of 60 runs. And in 1921 against Hampshire, he made 79 out of a partnership of 129 in 50 minutes for the eighth wicket with Dodger Whysall that led Nottinghamshire to an unlikely victory after they had fallen to 65 for six in search of 286 to win.

== Middle years ==
Better bowling form returned in 1922, when Barratt took 109 wickets at 16.33 runs each, the best bowling average in a single season in his career. Among the wickets were his career-best innings figures, eight for 26 against what Wisden termed a "helpless" Glamorgan team: the innings, which totalled just 47, lasted only 75 minutes. He maintained form in 1923, with 101 wickets and made the highest score of his career so far with 92 in "a wonderful display of hitting" against Leicestershire.

The seasons between 1924 and 1927 saw a slight dropping off from Barratt, though he remained an important part of the Nottinghamshire side. In Wisden 1925, he was singled out for consistency. In both 1924 and 1925, he took more than 90 wickets at an average of less than 20 runs per wicket, but in 1926, that fell to just 66 wickets at a cost of 32 runs apiece. The recovery to 75 wickets at 21.14 in 1927 owed something to his fourth return of eight wickets in an innings, eight for 53 against Worcestershire at Trent Bridge. Nor was the batting anything out of the ordinary: he failed to pass 50 in 1924, 1925 or 1926, and reached a highest of only 57 in 1927.

== All-rounder ==
This fallow period in the mid-1920s made his emergence as a genuine all-rounder in the 1928 season, his benefit year, all the more surprising. In all matches, he took 114 wickets at a cost of 25.18 runs each and, unexpectedly, made 1167 runs at an average of 29.17, not far short of double the average and more than double the aggregate he had achieved in any other season before. Wisden had an explanation for his sudden advance: it attributed it to "waiting more patiently than heretofore for the right ball to hit". It added that he "gave some remarkable displays of high speed scoring which never degenerated into mere slogging". The 1928 season saw the only two centuries of Barratt's career. The first, an unbeaten 139 which remained his highest score, came in a high-scoring match on an easy pitch with short boundaries at Coventry, and set some records. Nottinghamshire's total of 656 for three declared was the highest at the time for the loss of only three wickets, and four of the five batsmen used – George Gunn, Whysall, Willis Walker and Barratt – made hundreds. Barratt, unusually promoted to No 5, and Walker put on 196 in 84 minutes and Barratt's 139 included seven sixes and 18 fours in what Wisden termed "a remarkable display of powerful driving". The vast total was not a match-winner: Warwickshire batted across the rest of the second day after Nottinghamshire's declaration, and then rain prevented any play on the third and final day, so that there was no decision even on first innings.

Less than two weeks later, Barratt made his second century, this time hitting an undefeated 110 in the home match against Glamorgan at Trent Bridge. He reached 50 in 30 minutes and his century in 85, and Wisden said it involved "some mighty hitting", including five sixes. It was not an innings without blemish: "He was missed on eight occasions—five times in the long field."

== Test cricketer ==
Barratt maintained his 1928 form into the 1929 season, when Nottinghamshire won the County Championship for the first time since 1907. He made 860 runs at an average of 22.05, and twice scored more than 90 without reaching a century. As before his runs came quickly: 94 in 80 minutes against Surrey and 90 in 75 minutes against Middlesex being noted by Wisden. Bowling alongside Harold Larwood and Bill Voce in "an attack superior to that of any other county", Barratt took, in all matches, 129 wickets at a cost of 21.24 runs each. And when Larwood was injured before the Fourth Test against the South Africans at Old Trafford, Barratt was picked to replace him in a side captained by his county captain, Arthur Carr. He took one wicket in each innings in a match that England won by an innings. He was not picked for the final match of the series, when his place was taken by Nobby Clark of Northamptonshire.

In the winter of 1929–30, MCC picked tour parties to visit the newly Test-playing West Indies and New Zealand. Both sides were a mixture of established Test players and other county standard amateurs and professionals, and some "star" players of the time opted out entirely. Barratt was picked for the tour to New Zealand, with some first-class matches (but not Test matches) being played in Australia as well. He had what Wisden called "days of effectiveness with the ball". They included two good matches on the Australian leg of the tour, taking nine wickets in the match against South Australia and five in an innings against Victoria. But although he played in all four Tests in New Zealand, he was not successful, taking only three wickets in the series, and never more than one in an innings. And on the tour as a whole, his batting was not up to his recent standards, with no scores of 50 in the 11 first-class matches he played in.

== The end of the cricket career ==
Back in England in 1930, Barratt had what Wisden called "an unsatisfactory season". He scored 502 runs with three scores of more than 50, but his tally of wickets fell from 129 in 1929 to just 51, and their cost rose from 21 runs each to more than 31. Wisden cited wet pitches in a wet summer as a cause, but Barratt was also, by this stage, 36 years old. The following season, 1931, underlined the decline. In 21 County Championship matches, Barratt took only 24 wickets at a cost of more than 41 runs each, and he scored only 305 runs in these games at an average of 12.70. There was one last hurrah as a batsman: against Kent, he and Sam Staples put on 82 in half an hour, and in Barratt's innings of 72 there were five sixes. But by his last Championship match in August, in an admittedly strong batting line-up, Barratt was batting at No 11, and failing to take a wicket. At the end of the 1931 season, he retired from first-class cricket.
