= Bill Emery (cricketer) =

Welsh cricketer

Personal information
- Full name: William Emery
- Born: 25 August 1897; Pentrebach, Glamorgan, Wales
- Died: 13 December 1962 (aged 65); Gowerton, Glamorgan, Wales
- Batting: Right-handed
- Bowling: Right-arm medium

Domestic team information
- Years: Team
- 1925: Wales
- 1922: Glamorgan

Career statistics
Competition	FC
Matches	3
Runs scored	16
Batting average	3.20
100s/50s	–/–
Top score	11
Balls bowled	426
Wickets	6
Bowling average	41.00
5 wickets in innings	–
10 wickets in match	–
Best bowling	2/25
Catches/stumpings	–/–
- Source: Cricinfo, 26 June 2010

William Emery (25 August 1897 – 13 December 1962) was a Welsh cricketer. Emery was a right-handed batsman who bowled right-arm medium pace. He was born at Pentrebach, Glamorgan.

Emery represented Glamorgan in 2 first-class in 1922, against Lancashire and Nottinghamshire. In 1925, he represented Wales in a single first-class match against the Marylebone Cricket Club at Lord's.

Emery died at Gowerton, Glamorgan on 13 December 1962.
