= 1971 County Championship =

English cricket tournament

- Dates: 1 May – 14 September 1971
- Administrator: England and Wales Cricket Board
- Cricket format: First-class cricket
- Tournament format: League system
- Champions: Surrey (15th title)
- Participants: 17
- Matches: 204
- Most runs: Geoffrey Boycott, (Yorkshire); 2,197
- Most wickets: Don Shepherd, (Warwickshire); 101

The 1971 County Championship was the 72nd officially organised running of the County Championship. Surrey won the Championship title by virtue of winning more matches because they had finished level on points with Warwickshire.

== Table ==
- 10 points for a win
- 5 points to each team for a tie
- 5 points to team still batting in a match in which scores finish level
- Bonus points awarded in first 85 overs of first innings
- Batting: 1 point for each 25 runs above 150
- Bowling: 2 point for every 2 wickets taken
- No bonus points awarded in a match starting with less than 8 hours' play remaining.
- Position determined by points gained. If equal, then decided on most wins.
- Each team plays 24 matches.

	Team	P	W	L	D	Bat	Bowl	Pts
1	Surrey	24	11	3	10	63	82	255
2	Warwickshire	24	9	9	6	73	92	255
3	Lancashire	24	9	4	11	76	75	241
4	Kent	24	7	6	11	82	82	234
5	Leicestershire	24	6	2	16 (Note: Leicestershire were awarded 5 points for the draw against Surrey, as they were batting fourth when scores were tied.)	76	74	215
6	Middlesex	24	7	6	11	61	81	212
7	Somerset	24	7	4	13	50	89	209
8	Gloucestershire	24	7	3	13	50	81	201
9	Hampshire	24	4	6	14	70	82	192
10	Essex	24	6	5	13	43	84	187
11	Sussex	24	5	9	10	55	77	182
12	Nottinghamshire	24	3	7	14	58	83	171
13	Yorkshire	24	4	8	12	47	75	162
14	Northamptonshire	24	4	8	12	36	83	159
15	Worcestershire	24	3	7	14	46	76	152
16	Glamorgan	24	3	5	15	55	63	148
17	Derbyshire	24	1	4	19	51	81	142
