= Hugh Morris (cricketer) =

Welsh cricketer (1963–2025)

Hugh Morris MBE
Personal information
- Born: 5 October 1963; Cardiff, Glamorgan, Wales
- Died: 28 December 2025 (aged 62); Penarth, Glamorgan, Wales
- Batting: Left-handed
- Bowling: Right-arm medium

International information
- National side: England
- Test debut (cap 552): 25 July 1991 v West Indies
- Last Test: 22 August 1991 v Sri Lanka

Career statistics
Competition	Tests	FC	LA
Matches	3	314	274
Runs scored	115	19,785	8,606
Batting average	19.16	40.29	35.85
100s/50s	0/0	53/98	14/49
Top score	44	233*	154*
Balls bowled	–	348	30
Wickets	–	2	1
Bowling average	–	190.00	27.00
5 wickets in innings	–	0	0
10 wickets in match	–	0	0
Best bowling	–	1/6	1/14
Catches/stumpings	3/–	197/–	94/–
- Source: CricInfo, 30 December 2025

Hugh Morris MBE (5 October 1963 – 28 December 2025) was a Welsh cricketer who played in three Tests for England in 1991. He played county cricket for Glamorgan, captaining the county. He also served in roles with the England and Wales Cricket Board and Glamorgan in his post playing career.

== Early life ==
Hugh Morris was born at St David's Hospital in Cardiff, Wales, on 5 October 1963. Educated at Blundell's School in Devon, he set several public school batting records. He also played rugby union for Aberavon.

== Domestic career ==
A left-handed opening batsman, Morris made his county debut for Glamorgan at 17, and would become their youngest captain at the age of 22. In 1990, he set a club record of 2,276 runs, including 10 centuries. He captained Glamorgan to victory in the Sunday League in 1993, the county's first major trophy since 1969. In 1997 he was part of the Glamorgan side that won the County Championship, scoring 1207 runs at an average of 54.86. Morris equalled Alan Jones' club record for first-class centuries in the deciding fixture against Somerset that year with his 52nd in the first innings before being at the non-strikers end as opening partner Steve James hit the winning runs in the second innings.

== International career ==
Morris was called up to the English squad during the 1990–91 tour of Australia. After initially refusing to call over a replacement player when captain Graham Gooch was injured prior to the 1st test, the English management eventually called up Morris as a "reinforcement" after the 1st test. He only played in two minor matches however, with Wisden believing that "Morris ... but for Gooch's faith in Larkins must have been among the original sixteen."

Morris was then made captain for the 1990–91 England A tour of Pakistan and Sri Lanka (the Pakistan leg being curtailed due to the Gulf War). He would play three Tests later in 1991, two against the then-formidable West Indies, and one against Sri Lanka. He found the West Indies' pace attack difficult to handle, and in his three Tests scored 115 runs at an average of 19.16, although he shared England's best partnership of the series (112) with Gooch in his second Test, helping England to a rare and series-levelling victory against the West Indies. That winter he again captained England A on tour of the West Indies. He was reinstated as Glamorgan captain in 1993, and remained on the fringe of further Test selection for a number of years without ever being selected again.

== Post-playing career ==
Morris worked for several years for the England and Wales Cricket Board, where he was technical coaching director, acting chief executive and deputy chief executive before being appointed to chief executive. In August 2013 he returned to his native Glamorgan as chief executive and director of cricket. The club was at threat of liquidation, having amassed a debt of £17 million. During his time at the club, he oversaw multiple international fixtures and the founding of the Welsh Fire in The Hundred. Which led the club to be profitable once again by the time he retired in December 2023.

== Personal life and death ==
Morris was a trustee of the Hornsby Professional Cricketers' Fund charity. Diagnosed with throat cancer in 2002, and being cleared in 2007 after surgeries to remove throat glands, he served as patron of Heads Up, a head and neck cancer charity, for whom he helped raised £300,000.

He was appointed a Member of the Order of the British Empire (MBE) in the 2022 Birthday Honours for services to cricket and charity.

In 2021, Morris was diagnosed with bowel cancer, which also spread to his liver. He died in Penarth on 28 December 2025, at the age of 62.
