= Norman Riches =

Welsh cricketer (1883–1975)

- Norman Riches at a Glamorgan CCC function in 1970

Personal information
- Full name: Norman Vaughan Hurry Riches
- Born: 9 June 1883; Cardiff, Glamorgan, Wales
- Died: 6 November 1975 (aged 92); Cardiff, Glamorgan, Wales
- Batting: Right-handed
- Bowling: Right-arm medium
- Role: Occasional wicket-keeper
- Relatives: John Riches (son)

Domestic team information
- Years: Team
- 1925–1931: Marylebone Cricket Club
- 1923–1930: Wales
- 1912: Minor Counties
- 1901–1934: Glamorgan

Career statistics
| Competition | First-class |
|---|---|
| Matches | 104 |
| Runs scored | 5,750 |
| Batting average | 35.27 |
| 100s/50s | 9/32 |
| Top score | 239* |
| Balls bowled | 212 |
| Wickets | 4 |
| Bowling average | 28.00 |
| 5 wickets in innings | – |
| 10 wickets in match | – |
| Best bowling | 4/21 |
| Catches/stumpings | 49/6 |
- Source: Cricinfo, 13 June 2012

Norman Vaughan Hurry Riches (9 June 1883 – 6 November 1975) was a Welsh cricketer who played first-class cricket for Glamorgan from 1921 to 1934.

== Early life and education ==
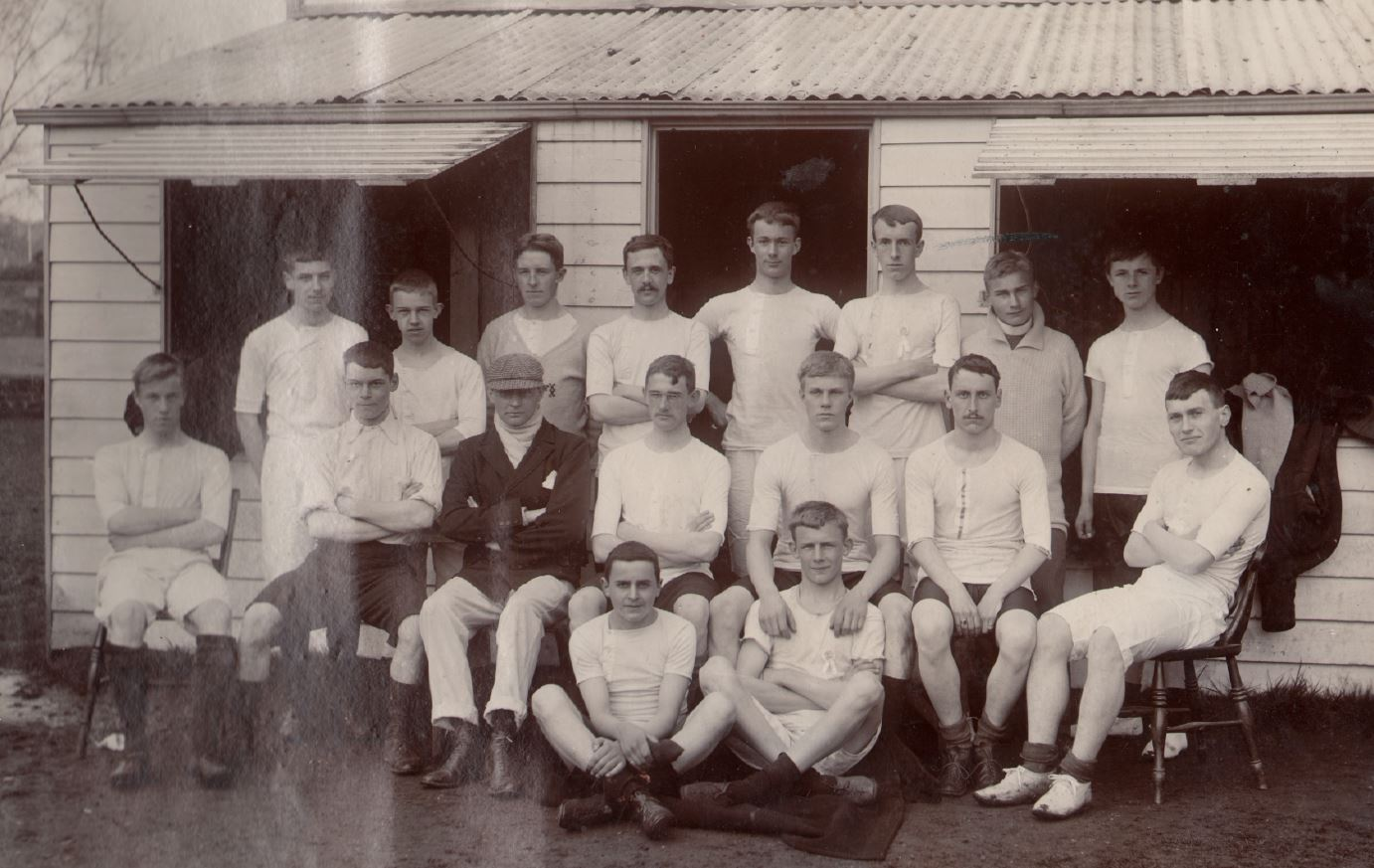
Norman Riches (back row far left) during the Abingdon School athletics past and present fixture in 1900.

The son of C. H. Riches of Tredegarville, Cardiff, Norman Riches joined Abingdon School from Chard School in 1900. He was a first team member of the football and athletics team and played cricket for the Old Abingdonians.

== Career ==
Riches worked as a dentist. A quick-footed, attacking batsman who was a shrewd judge of a quick run, he played cricket as an amateur for Glamorgan from 1901, initially as wicket-keeper. His first major innings was against Monmouth at Swansea when he scored 183 in 1904. Apart from two matches for Welsh teams against the touring South Africans in 1912, he played no first-class cricket until Glamorgan's initial season in the County Championship in 1921, when he captained the team, turning 38 during the season. His obituary in Wisden expressed the opinion that he had "the natural ability, the technique and the temperament" to have become a Test player, but had lacked the opportunity.

Riches was Glamorgan's only batsman of genuine class in their early years. He was an expert at placing his shots between the fieldsmen, and was particularly adept at the lofted shot with just enough power to clear the close field and produce two runs. He continued to represent Glamorgan until 1934, and was captain again in 1929. He scored nine first-class centuries and in 1921 was the first Glamorgan batsman to pass a thousand runs in first-class cricket. He was vice-chairman, trustee and patron of the club from 1934 to 1950. Riches also played for Cardiff Cricket Club from 1934 to 1947. He was a fine fieldsman in the covers or the deep and a competent first-class wicket-keeper, although he was reluctant to keep wicket for fear of damaging his hands, which he relied on in his profession.

In 1923 he played for the Gentlemen in the Gentlemen v Players match on 4 July. In 1926 he played for Wales against Ireland in Belfast, scoring 239 not out. As of late 2018 this remains the highest first-class score made in Ireland.

== See also ==
- List of Old Abingdonians
