= Warwickshire County Cricket Club in 2005 =

Warwickshire Bears

Ground
Edgbaston Cricket Ground
Website
Captain
Nick Knight
Squad
Overseas player
Heath Streak
Others
Moeen Ali
James Anyon
Ian Bell
Dougie Brown
Neil Carter
Tony Frost
Ashley Giles
Alex Loudon
Tom Mees
Trevor Penney
Keith Piper
Michael Powell
Dewald Pretorius
Adam Shantry
Naqqash Tahir
Jonathan Trott
Jim Troughton
Mark Wagh
Nick Warren
Ian Westwood
Benefit
Dougie Brown

Warwickshire County Cricket Club start 2005 as defending county champions and 11–4 favourites to retain their title. They play their totesport League cricket in Division Two. Warwickshire won the title in 2004 through their batting, and they have further enhanced it with the addition of Alex Loudon.

In the traditional Champion County v MCC match that kicks off the season, Warwickshire fared well, but ultimately lost to what essentially was an England A squad. However, when the Championship started, they immediately imposed their authority by thrashing Division One newcomers Glamorgan by an innings. Their first Sunday League game, against Somerset was abandoned as a draw because of rain.

In the second Championship game, Warwickshire were outplayed by Kent, who should have won. But determination saw Warwickshire through to the draw. The Bears were 9 wickets down when time was called. Then Ian Bell and Ashley Giles helped trounce Middlesex in the Championship. The following day they beat the Spitfires by 19 runs. On 3 and 4 May they beat Holland in the first round of the C&G Trophy.

They then lost to Sussex in first the totesport League and then the Championship. On 17 May they beat Leicestershire at home to progress to the Quarter-Finals of the C&G Trophy. Three days later they beat Derbyshire easily in the one-day league. They then beat Cambridge UCCE by 18 runs in an MCC University match, before trouncing title rivals Hampshire by ten wickets at home inside two days.

The first game of June saw a comfortable 4-day draw away to Surrey, before a 49-run win against the same opposition kept them in the promotion fight in the National League Division Two. Their fine first-class form continued, as they won their third County Championship match in style at Gloucestershire, but they were thumped by Kent in the next game, hampered by a groin injury to Heath Streak. That injury could have been a cause of their seven-wicket defeat at home to Leicestershire.

Warwickshire's long batting line-up came to surprisingly little use in the Twenty20 Cup, as they lost their first two matches, and their first win came against hapless Glamorgan. After six games, they had only scraped five points, and endured two one-run losses to Worcestershire. They managed to get through to the quarter-finals, however, thanks to big wins over Somerset and Northamptonshire. They followed that up with two wins in the National League, over Derbyshire and Durham, and also made it to the C&G Trophy semi-final with a five-wicket victory of Kent. So, going into the Twenty20 game with Surrey, they were on a five-game win streak, and after the scores were tied under the Duckworth-Lewis method the teams had to face off in a bowl-off. Warwickshire lost 3–4 to bow out of the tournament.

Their poor form was continued in the County Championship, where they lost in three days – with only four balls delivered on the third day – against Nottinghamshire. A win over Yorkshire meant that they kept their vital third place in Division 2 in the National League, though, and they advanced to second after defeating Kent. A crucial, and close, three-wicket win against Middlesex in the Championship followed, as Warwickshire jumped up to fifth place in the Championship, half a point ahead of Surrey in the third relegation spot, and they followed that up with a big ten-wicket win over whipping boys Glamorgan. A loss to Nottinghamshire, however, sent them right back into the mire. Some relief came in the C&G Trophy, when Warwickshire thumped Lancashire to progress to the final. Rain cancelled the National League match with Leicestershire, meaning that Warwickshire still trailed the promotion places by two points, and their loss to Sussex the following day did not help. However, they got revenge over Sussex by beating them in the County Championship later on in the week, but the next week saw two losses to Hampshire – first in the Championship and then in the C&G Trophy final.

The one-day losses continued, as the Bears fell to Somerset in the National League on the first Sunday in September, but they recovered with a Championship draw and a League win over Surrey. The latter left them with an outside chance of League promotion, trailing Derbyshire in third place by four points but with two games in hand, but they went up into third place with a win in Scotland, and got a four-point lead and a vastly superior net run rate to the fourth-place with a 102-run win over Yorkshire. Their Championship season ended in fourth place after a 181-run win over Gloucestershire, and despite losing their last National League match of the season to Durham Dynamos, Warwickshire were promoted, and will play in Division One of both the Championship and League in 2006.

== Tables ==
=== Championship ===
2005 County Championship – Division One
Pos	Team	Pld	W	D	L	Pen	BP	Pts
1	Nottinghamshire	16	9	4	3	0	94	236
2	Hampshire	16	9	4	3	0.5	92	233.5
3	Sussex	16	7	6	3	0	102	224
4	Warwickshire	16	8	3	5	0.5	86	209.5
5	Kent	16	6	7	3	8.5	99	202.5
6	Middlesex	16	4	7	5	0.5	98	181.5
7	Surrey	16	4	9	3	8.5	97	180.5
8	Gloucestershire	16	1	5	10	2	72	104
9	Glamorgan	16	1	1	14	0	71	88.5

=== totesport League ===
2005 totesport League – Division Two
Pos	Team	Pld	W	L	NR	T	Pts
1	Sussex Sharks	18	13	4	1	0	54
2	Durham Dynamos	18	12	4	2	0	52
3	Warwickshire Bears	18	10	6	2	0	44
4	Leicestershire Foxes	18	10	7	1	0	42
5	Derbyshire Phantoms	18	9	7	1	1	40
6	Somerset Sabres	18	9	8	1	0	38
7	Surrey Lions	18	7	10	1	0	30
8	Kent Spitfires	18	6	10	2	0	28
9	Yorkshire Phoenix	18	5	13	0	0	20
10	Scottish Saltires	18	2	14	1	1	12

== Match details ==
=== MCC v Warwickshire (8–11 April) ===
MCC beat Warwickshire by 7 wickets

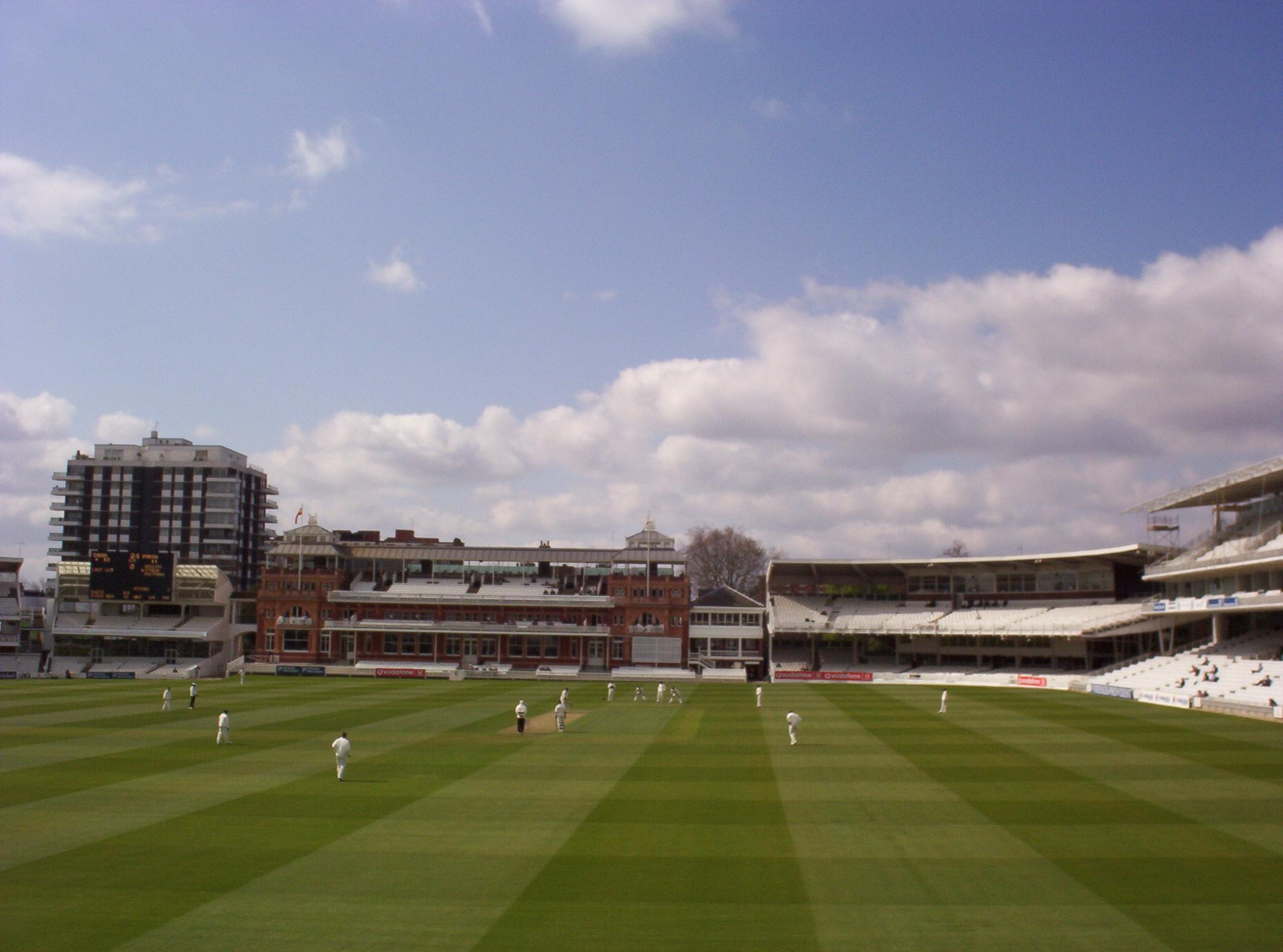
Heath Streak of Warwickshire about to bowl to Cook on 10 April.

Warwickshire were the Champion County in 2004, and therefore they kicked off the 2005 season with the traditional match against the Marylebone Cricket Club at Lord's on 8 April. The MCC side was effectively an "England A" team, with the match being the closest thing to a Test trial this season. It rained on and off throughout the first day. Just before 5pm, the captains tossed. Nick Knight of Warwickshire won the toss and elected to bat. However, more rain came down and at around 5pm play was abandoned – the first day of the 2005 cricket season would see no play.

The second day saw 87 overs of play before bad light ended the day's play. Warwickshire put on 347 for 5 declared. Nick Knight's 115 was the first century of the season. Wagh contributed 66 and Trott 75. The third day started with a confident and chanceless first wicket partnership of 109 between Alastair Cook and Matt Prior. Then Cook, who grafted out his innings with careful footwork and plenty of off-side shots, and Owais Shah, who got off to a difficult start, put on 166 runs for the second wicket, before Cook fell for 120. The MCC declared soon after at 275 for 2, 70 runs behind. Warwickshire started their second innings confidently, and were 70 for 3 at close on the third day.

On the fourth and last day, Warwickshire powered on to 225 for 4 before declaring, with Tony Frost top scoring with 91. This set the MCC a target of 296 to win. On a wicket that held up well, Cook added 97 to his first innings century. By the time he was third out at 235, Andy Flower was well set. He scored an undefeated 110 as the hosts won by 7 wickets with eight overs to spare. The MCC remain undefeated in the traditional game against the previous season's traditional county since the fixture was re-established in 1970. The match leaves Prior and Cook in contention for possible future England call-ups.(Cricinfo scorecard)

=== Warwickshire v Glamorgan (13–16 April) ===
Warwickshire (22pts) beat Glamorgan (1pt) by an innings and 43 runs

Glamorgan won the toss at a cold Edgbaston and chose to bat. The pitch had been roughed up to encourage turn for the benefit of Ashley Giles. The England selectors will have been pleased that he made the most of it, taking 6 for 44, the third-best figures of his career. First, however, Matthew Elliott, Glamorgan's Australian batsman scored 84 to take his team to a comfortable looking 157 for 3. However, Glamorgan then lost their final seven wickets for just 41 runs. Warwickshire's catching was excellent, as they restricted their opposition to 198 off 63.3 overs, two short of their first bonus point. Nick Knight and Mark Wagh then saw Warwickshire through to 68 for no loss, before bad light stopped play.

After losing Knight and Wagh with only 4 added to the overnight score, the Champion county showed their class. After the start of the day, the pitch calmed down, and England hopeful, Ian Bell, who scored 96, and Michael Powell put on 153 for the fourth wicket. Dougie Brown then helped himself to a half-century being unbeaten on 85 at close, with Powell on 144 not out and Warwickshire on 415 for 4, 217 ahead. Alex Wharf and Simon Jones bowled enthusiastically, but without much to show for it.

The bat dominated on a cold third day, with runs coming at around 5 an over, though this was aided by there being short boundaries. This allowed 362 runs to be scored, even though almost all the third session was lost to bad light. In the morning, Warwickshire's runs flowed freely. Although Powell only add 2, Brown moved on to 122, and Heath Streak had time to score 41 not out before Warwickshire declared on 564 for 8, 366 ahead. Elliott and David Hemp put on 162 for the second wicket. However, Matthew Maynard went for a duck, leaving Glamorgan on 213 for 4 at close.

On the fourth day, Robert Croft and Darren Thomas held Warwickshire briefly at bay with a partnership of 75, but this wasn't enough as Glamorgan succumbed for 323. Warwickshire captain, Nick Knight, said, "Once they were bowled out for 198 on that pitch they were always going to struggle. They then put down three catches, which proved to be decisive. We had a bit of luck so we are not going to start going around saying that we are going to win the Championship just because we have won one match." John Derrick, Glamorgan's coach, said, "Although we batted much better second time around, we made it difficult for ourselves by not scoring enough first innings runs. Warwickshire showed what playing pressure cricket is all about. They bowled with a lot of discipline. They piled up a big score to make sure that we did not get back into the game." (Cricinfo scorecard)

=== Warwickshire v Somerset (17 April) ===
Match abandoned – Warwickshire (2pts), Somerset (2pts)

Warwickshire won the toss at Edgbaston and put Somerset in to bat. Mike Burns dominated proceedings with his 107 from 134 balls, supported by Keith Parsons' 51 and James Hildreth's 54, as Somerset scored 254 for 5 in their 45 overs. However, then bad weather put an end to the day's play before Warwickshire had a chance to bat. (BBC scorecard)

=== Kent v Warwickshire (20–23 April) ===
Kent (10pts) drew with Warwickshire (10pts)

The first day at the St Lawrence Ground, Canterbury saw Warwickshire and England left arm spin bowler Ashley Giles take 5 for 86, and Martin van Jaarsveld 118 as Kent finished on 342 for 9. At the end of a second day, Kent took their score to 347. Nick Knight, who scored 100, and Ian Bell, with 63, got Warwickshire off to a good start. But from 179 for 1, Min Patel and Amjad Khan bowled Kent into the match. Warwickshire finished the day on 288 for 7 off 100 overs.

On the third day, Warwickshire were soon finished off for 309, 38 behind Kent. The Dane Khan did the brunt of the damage, finishing with on 6 for 73. Then van Jaarsveld and David Fulton played with great determination and put together their second century stand of the game with 155. At close, Kent were 308 for 6, 346 ahead, and they declared overnight.

On a fourth-day pitch favouring the spinners, Warwickshire found themselves in deep trouble on 73 for 5. If Kent were to finish champions, they really should have won from that position, but Tony Frost and Alex Loudon had different ideas when they batted throughout the whole afternoon session. After tea, Patel took three quick wickets, and Kent again looked on course for the win. But Frost, who scored 82, survived throughout the entire evening session, and after the ninth wicket fell, last man Neil Warren survived for 15 balls to earn Warwickshire the draw. They were 233 for 9 at stumps. (BBC scorecard)

=== Warwickshire v Middlesex (27–30 April) ===
Warwickshire (22pts) beat Middlesex (5pts) by seven wickets

Middlesex batted first at Edgbaston. Their Irish left-hander, Ed Joyce, was the anchor of the innings making 92 as he took his side from 56 for 4 to 253 for 7. He was assisted by a quick-fire half-century from Scott Styris, an innings somewhat out of pace with his team-mates' innings. They were finally all out for 298. Warwickshire lost 2 wickets in scoring 18 by the close.

Only 68 overs were possible on the second day. Ian Bell dominated, setting out his case for an England call-up, with 143 not out. He said, "If I was to play for England, I'd bat anywhere I was told to bat. Just to play would be great. I'm batting at three for Warwickshire and enjoying it. I know there’s some competition [for Test places] and there's a lot being talked about it. I've just got to concentrate on scoring as many runs as I can for Warwickshire." No other player scored so freely though, and Warwickshire ended the day on 277 for 6.

On the third day, England spin bowler Ashley Giles, who notched up 62, stayed with him. Bell was finally run out for a seven-hour 231 as Warwickshire closed on 430. Giles then starred with the ball, taking two wickets as Middlesex finished on 137 for 3 at stumps. On the fourth day, Giles tripled his tally to end with 6, as Middlesex faltered to 246 despite 63 from Joyce. That left Warwickshire needing only 115 to win, and despite Paul Hutchison taking two wickets, Bell led his team to a seven-wicket victory by scoring 47. (Cricinfo scorecard)

=== Warwickshire v Kent (1 May) ===
Warwickshire (4pts) beat Kent (0pts) by 19 runs

Nick Knight scored 122 off 125, the highest score of the National League season thus far, to boot the Bears up to 279 for 7 off their 45 overs. A spirited fightback from the Spitfires saw them hang in until the 44th over, but eventually, despite 82 from Martin van Jaarsveld and a 40-run last wicket stand between Simon Cook and Martin Saggers, they perished for 260 all out with 11 balls to go. (BBC scorecard)

=== Holland v Warwickshire (3–4 May) ===
Warwickshire beat Holland by 23 runs to progress to the Second Round of the C&G Trophy

Nick Knight made 108 in Rotterdam to take Warwickshire to 237 for 5, despite five maidens being bowled by the Dutch. In reply Holland were 101 for 4 off 27 runs when rain prevented play for the first day, leaving them 137 to win off 23 overs on the second day. Daan van Bunge was doing well with 37 off 37 balls at close. Van Bunge was the mainstay of the reply on the second day, and the Dutch looked good as long as he and Billy Stelling were at the crease, and they led the way to 205 for 5 before Stelling was caught off Neil Carter. That precipitated a collapse, as the last 4 wickets went for 9 runs, and Warwickshire saved a 23-run victory. (BBC scorecard)

=== Sussex v Warwickshire (8 May) ===
Sussex (4pts) beat Warwickshire (0pts) by 44 runs (D/L method)

Sussex Sharks had England wicket-keeper Matt Prior and former Zimbabwe batsman Murray Goodwin to thank for their imposing win over the Bears. Prior scored 144 – a career best score – and Goodwin 79 to lift Sussex to a massive 283 for 7, Zimbabwe all-rounder Heath Streak the only bowler with reasonably respectable figures of three for 39 off 9 overs. The reply was shortened by rain, setting Warwickshire 198 to win off 30 overs, but after 48 from Neil Carter there was little left in the Warwickshire reply as they finished on 153 for 7. (Cricinfo scorecard)

=== Sussex v Warwickshire (10–12 May) ===
Sussex (21pts) beat Warwickshire (2pts) by an innings and 87 runs

Michael Yardy (88) and Murray Goodwin (108) as Sussex made 282 for 6 on the first day at Hove. Batting was not easy, with Heath Streak, Dewald Pretorius and Neil Carter all swinging the ball. On the second day, Sussex moved to 412 all out, and in reply, defending champions Warwickshire made 141 for 5. There was worse news for England cricket fans as Ashley Giles was unable to field because of a strained hip flexor muscle. Giles said, "It's a shame because it's been going really well. It's the best start to a season I've had but the hip was a bit stiff last week and it got worse yesterday. I haven't had this kind of injury before so, even without the England situation, it would be stupid to make it any worse."

On the third day, Sussex completed the match. Warwickshire were all out for 179, and then, following-on they were dismissed again for 146. Fifteen wickets fell in 64 overs as the Sussex bowlers made the most of an erratically bouncing pitch. It was Warwickshire's first Championship loss since the last day of the 2003 season. (Cricinfo scorecard)

=== Warwickshire v Leicestershire (17 May) ===
Warwickshire beat Leicestershire by 83 runs to progress to the Quarter-Finals of the C&G Trophy

Dougie Brown took a wicket in each of his first three overs to help a poor Warwickshire one-day side to victory at Edgbaston. Warwickshire batted first, and the hosts were on 78 for two after 15 overs, with Nick Knight (69) and Ian Bell (35) in control. Then Bell was stumped attacking a ball from Claude Henderson leaving the score on 116 for 3 in the 22nd over. There then was a collapse as 5 fell for 64, before Heath Streak and Tony Frost put on 55 in the last 9 overs to lift Warwickshire to 235.

In Leicestershire's innings immediately faltered as Brown's wickets reduced them to 16 for 3. Brown was helped by good tight bowling from Heath Streak at the other end, which meant they chose to attack Brown. Leicestershire tried to rebuild, but never managed it, finally being dismissed for 152 with 6.3 overs to go. (Cricinfo scorecard)

=== Derbyshire v Warwickshire (20 May) ===
Warwickshire (4pts) beat Derbyshire (0pts) by 52 runs

Derbyshire Phantoms suffered another drubbing at Derby after Warwickshire Bears raced past 200 thanks to half-centuries from Nick Knight and Jim Troughton. Although 6 wickets fell in the last 10 overs, they still made 260, with Troughton top-scoring with 73. In reply, Derbyshire lost wickets regularly, and although Jonathan Moss scored 65, no-one was able to stay with him as the hosts were all out for 208. (Cricinfo scorecard)

=== Cambridge UCCE v Warwickshire (21–23 May) ===
Warwickshire beat Cambridge UCCE by 18 runs

Warwickshire survived a scare as a virtual second XI still beat the Cambridge students by 18 runs. The first day at Fenner's was ruined by rain, with only 6 overs possible. Warwickshire batted first, losing three wickets for no runs to collapse to 48 for 4, but Jonathan Trott's three-hour 150 not out lifted the visitors to 296 for 6 declared. In reply, Zohail Sharif made an unbeaten fifty as the students made their way to 109 for 1 in just 24 overs. An overnight declaration from the students was followed by an equalling blazing accumulation of runs from Warwickshire led them to 127 for 1. In the reply, Cambridge came too close for comfort, though, and at 281 for 6 with 34 runs left to hit it looked like they could do it – but opening batsman and off spinner Alex Loudon came to the rescue with three wickets for 48, as Cambridge collapsed to 296 all out and lost the match by 18 runs. (Cricinfo scorecard)

=== Warwickshire v Hampshire (25–26 May) ===
Warwickshire (19pts) beat Hampshire (3pts) by ten wickets

Defending champions Warwickshire needed a win against table-toppers Hampshire to stay in the title chase, and in a low-scoring match at Stratford-on-Avon they managed it. The Scot Dougie Brown was the pick of the bowlers, taking four for 59 as the visitors crumbled to 184, rescued somewhat by a run-a-ball 34 from off-spinner Shaun Udal who batted at nine. Nick Knight and 22-year-old Ian Westwood, batting in his fourth first-class game, sent Warwickshire to 135 for 0 before losing a couple of wickets before stumps. The second day belonged to Hampshire, however, taking seven wickets – captain Shane Warne with six of them for 88 runs, as they crumbled to 265.

However, a magnificent spell from Zimbabwean all-rounder Heath Streak, who took four wickets for 11 from nine overs, including five maidens, reduced Hampshire to 34 for 5 before Michael Brown and Sean Ervine rebuilt. However, two quick wickets before tea meant that Hampshire led by six runs with three wickets remaining – a surefire loss, almost. They rebuilt somewhat, but another two wickets from Streak resulted in him finishing with 6 for 31, and Hampshire were bowled out for 124. Nick Knight then smashed 39 not out off 27 balls to see Warwickshire past the 44-run target inside 4.4 overs and a win inside two days. (Cricinfo scorecard)

=== Warwickshire v Scotland (29 May) ===
Scotland (4pts) beat Warwickshire (0pts) by one wicket

A poor pitch at Stratford-on-Avon, and some lacklustre batting saw the Warwickshire Bears record their second loss in the National League, as they crumbled to 113 all out on their home ground. Australian-born Paul Hoffmann took three for 19 for Scotland Saltires, but all the Scottish bowlers chipped in with wickets, and it was in fact a good recovery from Warwickshire as they were 17 for 5 and 48 for 7. In reply, Dougie Lockhart and South African Jonathan Beukes recorded good partnership to lift Scotland to 70 for 1, but a burst of wickets from Heath Streak turned the match again, as Scotland lost four wickets for 20 runs. However, Hoffmann saw Scotland across the line, smashing a six off Neil Carter to win the match by one wicket. Extras were the second-highest scorer, with 28, as Warwickshire conceded 20 wides. (Cricinfo scorecard)

=== Surrey v Warwickshire (1–4 June) ===
Surrey (10pts) drew with Warwickshire (8pts)

Surrey had the better of the first three days at Whitgift School, which is located in Croydon and is now in its fifth year as a festival venue. Richard Clinton and Jonathan Batty both made 84 to bring up a first innings total of 340 for the hosts, and Mohammad Akram then took 5 for 51 as the defending champions were all out for 209 on the second day, and Scott Newman survived five overs with Clinton, adding 14 runs. Surrey declared on 310 for 7, which gave them just over a day to bowl out Warwickshire. Despite fine bowling from Harbhajan Singh, who was making his Surrey debut, the Warwickshire batsmen held up well with Michael Powell and Alex Loudon putting on an unbeaten partnership of 131 to see them safe on 222 for 3 at close. (Cricinfo scorecard)

=== Surrey v Warwickshire (5 June) ===
Warwickshire (4pts) beat Surrey (0pts) by 49 runs

At Whitgift School, Warwickshire Bears recorded a massive 309 for 8 in 45 overs to bat Surrey Lions out of the game. Neil Carter opened the innings with a typical 58 off only 36 balls, smashing four sixes and five fours in the process, while James Troughton scored 69. Only medium-pacer Neil Saker, playing in his seventh List-A game, avoided the routing as he was hit for 17 off five overs, taking the wicket of Jonathan Trott for 9. In reply, Mark Ramprakash and Ali Brown looked to take Surrey to the target, but when Brown departed for 52 off 34 balls, the air went out of Surrey's balloon. Ramprakash scored 89 not out, and became Surrey's top scorer, but Surrey finished all out for 260 with 22 balls remaining in their innings as Carter took three for 37 while Heath Streak and Dougie Brown snared two wickets each. (Cricinfo scorecard)

=== Gloucestershire v Warwickshire (10–13 June) ===
Warwickshire (22pts) beat Gloucestershire (4pts) by an innings and 2 runs

A massive batting effort from Warwickshire compounded with a remarkable second-innings bowling spell from Heath Streak and a spineless Gloucestershire effort in general, saw Warwickshire move to the top of the Division One table. It started all right enough for the hosts at Bristol, as a marathon three-hour fifty from James Pearson and 23 extras sent them to 254 on the first day. However, a partnership of 151 between Ian Bell and Jonathan Trott lifted Warwickshire into the ascendancy, as no Gloucestershire bowler found the required bite, and everyone of the top ten except Michael Powell went into double figures as Warwickshire amassed 473 in nearly 150 overs. Then, Streak stole the show. As Streak grabbed four wickets in the first hour, Gloucestershire were quickly 20 for 5, and despite a rescuing effort from Mark Alleyne and Ian Fisher, Gloucestershire were all out for 217 – two runs short of making Warwickshire bat again. (Cricinfo scorecard)

=== Warwickshire v Kent (15–18 June) ===
Kent (22pts) beat Warwickshire (3pts) by an innings and 164 runs

Warwickshire felt the loss of seamer Heath Streak to injury as they went down by a massive margin to a strong Kent side at Maidstone. Batting first, Warwickshire were 116 for 8 when Tony Frost departed for 23, Simon Cook and Amjad Khan having taken three wickets each. However, a ninth-wicket partnership of 97 between Streak and Neil Carter, along with a level-headed stand from the number 11 Neil Warren lifted Warwickshire to 252. As it turned out, it was nowhere near enough. Streak limpered off in his fifth over with a groin injury, leaving all-rounder Alex Loudon and Carter to do the brunt of the bowling, and they were woefully ineffective against Kent's batting line-up. Matthew Walker and Darren Stevens both made centuries for Kent, Martin van Jaarsveld chipped in with 62, while Loudon was Warwickshire's best bowler with three for 130, Kent amassed 569 – a lead of 317 runs. In the twenty overs remaining on the third day, Andrew Hall dug out two wickets for Kent, including England Test batsman Ian Bell for a duck. On a fourth-day pitch which turned plenty, Min Patel could take six for 53, as Warwickshire crumbled in a woeful heap for 153. (Cricinfo scorecard)

=== Warwickshire v Leicestershire (19 June) ===
Leicestershire (4pts) beat Warwickshire (0pts) by seven wickets

The most striking feature of this match would be Ashley Giles returning to bowl for Warwickshire Bears after a hip injury, replacing Heath Streak, who had been injured in the groin in the previous match. However, it couldn't help them against Leicestershire Foxes. The hosts won the toss and batted first, and promptly crumbled to 43 for 4, after good new-ball bowling from Ottis Gibson and Charl Willoughby. Jonathan Trott hit 93, however, as the Bears recovered to 217 for 6. Their innings included three run outs. Leicestershire were always on target and won with eight balls to spare, Darren Maddy recording a 114-ball century and ending with 107 not out as Leicestershire reached 218 for 3. (Cricinfo scorecard)

=== Worcestershire v Warwickshire (22 June) ===
Worcestershire (2pts) beat Warwickshire (0pts) by one run

In the local battle at New Road, Worcestershire Royals eked out a victory over rivals Warwickshire Bears. Graeme Hick and Ben Smith both made big scores, with 67 and 47, and skipper Gareth Batty also made 21 to send Worcestershire to 177 for 7. Warwickshire then collapsed to accurate bowling, losing their entire top order except Jonathan Trott to end up on 68 for 5 – but Michael Powell made 40 not out batting at seven, turning the innings almost back to Warwickshire's favour. In the end, however, they were two runs short, their No. 11 Nick Warren only managing to hit one off the two balls he faced. (Cricinfo scorecard)

=== Northamptonshire v Warwickshire (24 June) ===
Northamptonshire (2pts) beat Warwickshire (0pts) by 38 runs

Northamptonshire Steelbacks took their second victory from two Twenty20 Cup matches thus far, as they accumulated 143 for 5 in 14 overs, despite no batsman hitting more than 40 in a rain-shortened match at Northampton. Scotsman Dougie Brown took one for nine off three overs for Warwickshire Bears, but the target was too large for the visitors, as Northamptonshire bowler Ben Phillips removed four Warwickshire lower-order batsmen – his second four-wicket-haul in three days – as the Bears crumbled to 105 for 9. (Cricinfo scorecard)

=== Glamorgan v Warwickshire (25 June) ===
Warwickshire (2pts) beat Glamorgan (0pts) by 54 runs

Warwickshire Bears won their first Twenty20 match of the season in style, the deep batting line-up finally paying off. Almost every batsman contributed in their massive 205 for 7, Jamie Troughton top-scoring with 42, and no Glamorgan Dragons bowler escaped their wrath. When the Dragons batted, only Matthew Elliott and Sourav Ganguly gave them any hope of winning, and Ganguly's 36 off 35 balls was verging on the point of being useless when the required rate was 10 an over. A disciplined Warwickshire fielding effort – the Bears only conceded one extra – and Alex Loudon taking five for 33, resulted in Glamorgan falling to 151 all out in 18.2 overs. (Cricinfo scorecard)

=== Gloucestershire v Warwickshire (28 June) ===
No result; Gloucestershire (1pt), Warwickshire (1pt)

37 balls were delivered before Gloucestershire Steelbacks and Warwickshire Bears were forced to abandon the game at The County Ground, Bristol due to rain. Warwickshire were 44 for 1 after 10 leg-byes and 16 not out from Nick Knight when the game was stopped. (Cricinfo scorecard)

=== Warwickshire v Glamorgan (30 June) ===
Warwickshire (2pts) beat Glamorgan (0pts) by four runs

Glamorgan Dragons continued their poor form in an eventful game at Edgbaston. Jamie Troughton's 51 rescued Warwickshire Bears from a potentially tricky situation at 56 for 4, and quick hitting from Dougie Brown along with eleven extras gave the hosts a total of 169 for 9. Glamorgan started well, with Sourav Ganguly and Matthew Elliott lifting them to 88 for 1 before leaving in quick succession to Neil Carter and Jonathan Trott respectively. Michael Powell and David Hemp then built another big partnership of 59 to see Glamorgan 147 for 3, but Carter and Brown then shared five wickets as Glamorgan's lower middle order fell apart. Powell tried to pair up with Dean Cosker, but the damage was already done, and Powell was run out on the penultimate ball as they needed six runs from two balls. (Cricinfo scorecard)

=== Warwickshire v Worcestershire (1 July) ===
Worcestershire (2pts) beat Warwickshire (0pts) by one run

Worcestershire Royals took their second successive one-run victory over Warwickshire Bears, to the agony of home fans at Edgbaston. After Heath Streak took two early wickets, Neil Carter entered the scene as the sixth bowler to be used. He took five wickets inside four overs, for 19 runs, as Worcestershire were all out for 141 with seven balls to spare. In reply, two run outs and wickets from Gareth Batty and Zander de Bruyn left Warwickshire trailing by 60 with one wicket in hand, with Heath Streak and James Anyon at the crease. Streak rotated the strike well, facing most of the balls and hitting most of the runs, and brought the score to 140 for 9 with a ball to spare. Then – setting off for the last run that would tie the scores (and win the match for Warwickshire on fewer wickets lost) – Streak was run out for 59, off 32 balls, and Warwickshire's quarter-final hopes were dented, but not wiped out. (Cricinfo scorecard)

=== Warwickshire v Somerset (4 July) ===
Warwickshire (2pts) beat Somerset (0pts) by 47 runs

Warwickshire Bears jumped on the quarter-final train just as it seemed to be leaving the station, grabbing the ticket out of the hands of Somerset Sabres. Neil Carter and Ian Bell opened the batting and scored quickly, sending the score to 40 for 1, but part-timer William Durston got three wickets in quick succession to have three for four at one point. Trevor Penney then smashed three successive sixes off Durston to end with 35 not out off 13 balls. Thus, Warwickshire closed on 172 for 8, and patient bowling from Carter and Alex Loudon sent them crumbling to 89 for 6. Arul Suppiah and Durston paired up for 27 for the seventh wicket, but when Suppiah was bowled by Jonathan Trott it looked hopeless for Somerset. Jamie Anyon wrapped them up with a hat-trick to end Somerset's innings on 125. (Cricinfo scorecard)

=== Warwickshire v Northamptonshire (6 July) ===
Warwickshire (2pts) beat Northamptonshire (0pts) by 41 runs

Warwickshire Bears were lifted to a total of 205 for 2 by hitting eight sixes at Edgbaston, Ian Bell carrying his side with 66 not out off just 38 balls. Nick Knight also made 61 as Northamptonshire Steelbacks failed to make any impact with the ball. The Northamptonshire reply was stifled by some reasonably economical bowling, with no regular bowler conceding more than eight an over, and good fielding which yielded one run out and stopped the boundaries. Warwickshire seamer Jamie Anyon took three for 34, for his second successive match with a three-wicket haul, while Usman Afzaal became top scorer with a run-a-ball 43. Ben Phillips hit 41 not out from number four to complement his bowling figures of two for 43. In the end, Northamptonshire made 164 for 6, but still went through – along with Warwickshire, who finished second in their group thanks to their win over Somerset two days earlier. (Cricinfo scorecard)

=== Warwickshire v Derbyshire (9 July) ===
Warwickshire (4pts) beat Derbyshire (0pts) by five wickets

Warwickshire Bears squeezed to a five-wicket win at Edgbaston thanks to good bowling and a quickfire innings from wicket-keeper Trevor Penney. Derbyshire Phantoms batted first, losing wickets regularly, with only Steve Stubbings making over 25 with his 108-ball 69. Neil Carter excelled with the ball, taking three for 28, although four of six Warwickshire bowlers took part in Derbyshire's collapse to 201 for 9. Warwickshire's reply was haunted by wickets taken by Jonathan Moss – who ended with three for 32 – however, Jonathan Trott and Trevor Penney added 38 for the last wicket, and Warwickshire passed the target with five balls to spare. (Cricinfo scorecard)

=== Warwickshire v Kent (15 July) ===
Warwickshire beat Kent by five wickets to progress to the Semi-Finals of the C&G Trophy

Andrew Hall and Rob Key gave Kent some hope of winning the match at Edgbaston with their opening partnership of 120 runs, but spinners Ashley Giles and Alex Loudon broke through twice each to limit the final score to 259 for 6. Warwickshire's reply centred on former England ODI player Nic Knight, who made fourteen fours in his 27th one-day century. Three wickets from Justin Kemp had earlier set Warwickshire back to 118 for 3, but Knight and Trevor Penney who made 50 not out off 43 balls, guided Warwickshire to the target with nearly four overs to spare. (Cricinfo scorecard)

=== Durham v Warwickshire (17 July) ===
Warwickshire (4pts) beat Durham (0pts) by five wickets

Durham Dynamos were to regret their decision of batting first against Warwickshire Bears. On a poor pitch, Warwickshire bowlers Heath Streak, Dougie Brown and Neil Carter took full advantage – the latter two bowling a total of nine maiden overs, while Streak took three for 13 before breaking down with an injury. Durham were 49 for 8 before Liam Plunkett and Neil Killeen chipped in with low but sensible scores, while Dale Benkenstein made 90 at the other end – over sixty per cent of Durham's total of 147. Despite Ashley Noffke taking two early wickets, Alex Loudon anchored the chase with 51 off 61 deliveries, and Warwickshire batted to 148 for 5 with over ten overs remaining. (Cricinfo scorecard)

=== Surrey v Warwickshire (18 July) ===
Match tied (D/L Method); Surrey won 4–3 in a bowl-out and progress to the Semi-Finals of the Twenty20 Cup

In an incredible finish to the knock-out quarter-final between Surrey Lions and Warwickshire Bears, the match was tied, so the players had to resort to a bowl-off – cricket's version of a penalty shootout, in which five players have two attempts at bowling at unguarded stumps, and if the stumps fall down, that was one point for their team. Surrey opened the batting in this match at The Oval, having been put in to bat by the Bears' captain Nick Knight. It was a shaky effort, often interrupted by wickets, and part-timer Jonathan Trott snared two wickets for 19 – admittedly tail-enders Ian Salisbury and Tim Murtagh. Mark Ramprakash, however, hit an unbeaten run-a-ball 34 to guide Surrey to 149 for 8, well below a par score. Warwickshire's innings then began under heavy cloud cover that assisted the Surrey swing bowlers. After Neil Carter went first ball, Warwickshire struggled in the rain, and the bad weather eventually stopped play just before five overs was played – so that, if the players couldn't return, the match would be declared a no-result. However, the rain gave way reasonably quickly, and quick hitting from Trevor Penney in particular – who made 20 off 12 balls before being caught off a ball from Rikki Clarke closed down the deficit.

With five overs being cut off the Warwickshire chase, they needed 118 from 15 overs, and they had got to 115 for 8 with one ball remaining and Dewald Pretorius and an injured Heath Streak, who had not bowled, at the crease. The umpires consulted, and were uncertain about what would happen if Warwickshire scored two – which, in the event, happened. As the par scores under Duckworth-Lewis were level, the captains agreed to have a bowl-off (alternatively the umpires could have forced a bowl-off or decided the game on a toss of the coin). After five players had tried to get the stumps down, both teams had managed the feat twice, and now a sudden death style bowl-off followed. The next player from each side managed to get the stumps down once each, so the score was now 3–3, but Warwickshire's Heath Streak missed both his attempts and Tim Murtagh got the stumps down and won the match for the hosts by 4–3. (Cricinfo scorecard)

=== Warwickshire v Nottinghamshire (20–22 July) ===
Nottinghamshire (20pts) beat Warwickshire (4pts) by ten wickets

An eventful match at Edgbaston looked to give Nottinghamshire the lead in the County Championship, as they swept aside Warwickshire with few problems. The Warwickshire batting line-up sorely missed Ian Bell, who was on Test match duty for England, and after an opening partnership of 101 between Nic Knight and Ian Westwood, an implosion followed. Warwickshire faltered to 168 for 8, and only 21-year-old Luke Parker, playing his seventh first-class match, saved them from a sub-200 score as he made an unbeaten 34.

Warwickshire's bowling, which lacked an injured Heath Streak, also suffered, and despite excellent figures of six for 92 from Alex Loudon the Nottinghamshire batsmen ran away with it as Darren Bicknell, Jason Gallian and Australian David Hussey all made fifties. Then, it was a Nottinghamshire spinner's turn to take centre stage – Graeme Swann. In 23 overs, he took six for 57, including the entire Warwickshire middle order from three to six – only Westwood passed 25, and Warwickshire could only muster 133. As if to make the humiliation complete, Swann was promoted to number 1, and hit one boundary and four additional runs before stumps were drawn after one over. Nottinghamshire were eight for no loss overnight, chasing 12 to win, and Darren Bicknell hit the winning runs off Dewald Pretorius four balls into the fourth day. (Cricinfo scorecard)

=== Yorkshire v Warwickshire (24 July) ===
Warwickshire (4pts) beat Yorkshire (0pts) by seven wickets

Yorkshire Phoenix were tied down by Warwickshire Bears bowlers Dougie Brown and Alex Loudon, as the Phoenix only managed to post 201 for 7 at Scarborough. Brown took one for 32 and Loudon one for 23 off nine overs each, Michael Lumb being restricted to 57 off 86 balls as top scorer for Yorkshire. Two early wickets from Neil Carter also helped the Warwickshire fielding effort. In reply, Carter smacked six sixes and five fours, taking 38 balls to make 65, and Jonathan Trott and Jamie Troughton took Warwickshire to the target with seven wickets and just over seven overs to spare, as Yorkshire's losing streak in the National League was extended to three matches. (Cricinfo scorecard)

=== Kent v Warwickshire (27 July) ===
Warwickshire (4pts) beat Kent (0pts) by three wickets

In a day/night match at St Lawrence Ground, Warwickshire captain Nick Knight sent Kent in to bat, and his South African pace bowler Dewald Pretorius took a flurry of wickets in good bowling conditions. Ending with five for 32, he took the first five wickets of the innings as Kent collapsed to 29 for 5, but South Africans Justin Kemp and Martin van Jaarsveld rebuilt quickly. Despite little support – no batsman apart from himself passed 25 – Kemp made his way to 84 off 93 balls, as Kent scrambled 177 for 9. In reply, Warwickshire got to 19 for 0, but a fiery spell from Martin Saggers yielded three wickets, as Nick Knight, Ian Bell and Jamie Troughton were all dismissed in single figures. Warwickshire's fifth-wicket partners saw off the opening bowling, however, and went after the part-timers instead, in chase of what suddenly looked like a big target of 178.

Alex Loudon rebuilt well, however, with just 20 of his 73 runs coming in boundaries, while his first partner Jonathan Trott failed to hit any runs and probably did the team a favour when he edged a ball from Robert Joseph – cousin of West Indies batsman Sylvester Joseph – behind, gone for 10 off 40 balls. The wicket looked like it was the first of a collapse, however, as Trevor Frost departed shortly afterwards with Warwickshire on 62 for 6. However, Trevor Penney made 42 – including just the one four – in a 77-run partnership with Loudon, and Dougie Brown made an unbeaten 16 at the end to lead Warwickshire home with five balls to spare. (Cricinfo scorecard)

=== Middlesex v Warwickshire (3–6 August) ===
Warwickshire (19pts) beat Middlesex (5.5pts) by three wickets

Warwickshire had got adequate replacement for their injured Zimbabwean Heath Streak, as Makhaya Ntini took four for 79 on his debut for the Bears against Middlesex. However, Paul Weekes made 92 not out to rescue them from a poor position at 139 for 6 to a final total of 323. Then, another overseas player making his overseas debut – Stuart Clark from New South Wales, Australia – took five wickets, three on the first day and two on the second, as Warwickshire plummeted to 85 for 6. It took another 92 – from Scot Dougie Brown to see them past 200, and his four-hour knock proved invaluable to Warwickshire's eventual turn-around.

Ben Hutton and Owais Shah looked to set a massive target on day three, however, pairing up for 151 to add to Middlesex' 51-run first innings lead – but again Ntini came to the rescue for Warwickshire, as only Shah got the ball off the square and Middlesex whimpered from 281 for 3 to 330 all out. Shah finished not out, having hit 15 fours and two sixes in a five-hour 156. Peter Trego then took two wickets with two balls as Warwickshire fell to six for two, but Jamie Troughton smacked four sixes and twelve fours in a quickfire 119 as Warwickshire forced their way to 221 for 3 at stumps, with Nick Knight not out overnight on 67, leaving the match poised with 161 to win and seven wickets in hand. Knight was dismissed for 75 by the Australian Clark, who also removed Neil Carter for 15, but Alex Loudon proved too difficult to get out. His unbeaten 95, along with 27 not out from Luke Parker, saw Warwickshire pass the target with three wickets to spare, despite Middlesex' slow over rate, which caused them to be deducted half a point. (Cricinfo scorecard)

=== Glamorgan v Warwickshire (10–12 August) ===
Warwickshire (22pts) beat Glamorgan (3pts) by ten wickets

Warwickshire took control of proceedings on the first day at Colwyn Bay, as they fielded a bowling attack with no English-born players against Glamorgan. South African international Makhaya Ntini was the least effective, only getting the wicket of number 11 Dean Cosker, and conceding 49 runs in the process. Meanwhile, Scot Dougie Brown took four for 58, but Glamorgan actually recovered quite well from 76 for 6 to their final score of 239. However, their blunt bowling attack were shown up again, as Ian Westwood recorded his maiden first-class century, four batsmen passed fifty, and Warwickshire muscled their way to 545 for 7 before declaring. Jonathan Trott also made 152 for Warwickshire, while Robert Croft was the most effective bowler – with three for 126.

Wicket-keeper Mark Wallace then smashed 68 not out off 50 balls to see Glamorgan to the end of the day at 99 for 1. However, he only faced two balls on the third morning before being lbw to Brown. Most of the Warwickshire bowlers got in among the wickets – part-time medium pace bowler Trott taking two for 19 in four overs, for example – and Warwickshire were set three to win, which they achieved off fourteen deliveries as Nick Knight hit a single off David Harrison. (Cricinfo scorecard)

=== Nottinghamshire v Warwickshire (14–16 August) ===
Nottinghamshire (22pts) beat Warwickshire (2.5pts) by an innings and 151 runs

Ryan Sidebottom dug out the top four, ending with four for 41, and Andrew Harris got exactly the same figures (but from half the overs), as Warwickshire crashed to 156 at Trent Bridge after winning the toss and opting to bat first. And from then on, it only got worse for the visitors from the Midlands. Only Dougie Brown's 34 not out took them past 150, and he then took two wickets as Nottinghamshire looked to go the same way – being 45 for 3. However, David Hussey and Chris Read batted well together, seeing Nottinghamshire to stumps and making fifties. Their 148-run partnership gave Nottinghamshire a healthy lead, but Hussey did not stop there. He made a career-best 232 not out – eventually running out of partners as Nottinghamshire finished on 514, to secure a first-innings lead of 358. Brown took five for 128, but despite bowling the most overs of all he could not stop the rampant Hussey. Nick Knight was injured and could not bat, so with ten men Warwickshire had to score 358 to make Nottinghamshire bat again. It was an impossible task – Alex Loudon and Neil Carter both made scores in the forties, but the team succumbed to 207 and their third innings defeat of the season. Warwickshire were later deducted 0.5 points for a slow over rate on day two. (Cricinfo scorecard)

=== Warwickshire v Lancashire (20 August) ===
Warwickshire beat Lancashire by 99 runs to progress to the C&G Trophy Final

Warwickshire put in a fine bowling effort to send Lancashire out of the C&G Trophy, despite Lancashire's Australian Marcus North taking three wickets. North's bowling – and others, Sajid Mahmood took two wickets – set Warwickshire back to 155 for 7, but Michael Powell and Trevor Frost put on an eighth-wicket partnership of 81 runs to carry Warwickshire to a total of 236 for 8 after 50 overs. Lancashire looked on track when Mal Loye and Stuart Law negotiated some tricky early bowling to put on 49 for the fourth wicket and see the score to 80 for 3, but medium pacer Jamie Anyon took two wickets, and a fiery spell from Neil Carter, which included two wickets to see him end with four for 26, had Lancashire bowled out for 137. (Cricinfo scorecard)

=== Leicestershire v Warwickshire (22 August) ===
Match abandoned without a ball bowled; Leicestershire (2pts), Warwickshire (2pts)

Leicestershire Foxes and Warwickshire Bears were looking to fight it out for a spot in the top three, but rain made play impossible at Grace Road, and the teams shared the spoils. (Cricinfo scorecard)

=== Warwickshire v Sussex (23 August) ===
Sussex (4pts) beat Warwickshire (0pts) by five wickets

Sussex Sharks opened up a four-point gap after a spell of left-arm spin bowling from Michael Yardy yielded the last six wickets of Warwickshire Bears' innings for 27 runs, the best bowling figures in Division Two of the National League all season. Earlier, Sussex pacer Rana Naved-ul-Hasan had made inroads with three wickets for 25, and it was only the 73-run partnership between Alex Loudon and Michael Powell that got Warwickshire past 100. Yardy's six-for left Warwickshire all out for 169, however, and in the chase Sussex were troubled by Makhaya Ntini's fast bowling as both opening batsmen were removed and Sussex crumbled to 16 for 2. However, Zimbabwean Murray Goodwin scored a solid, two-hour 86 not out, and guided the team to the target, putting on 82 with Robin Martin-Jenkins after spinner Alex Loudon had taken two wickets to set Sussex back to 91 for 5. (Cricinfo scorecard)

=== Warwickshire v Sussex (25–28 August) ===
Warwickshire (22pts) beat Sussex (8pts) by 101 runs

For once, Rana Naved-ul-Hasan went wicketless on the first day, and thus Sussex lost the match and the Championship lead at Edgbaston. Warwickshire's Jonathan Trott, who had made a career best 152 two weeks previously, now notched up his third first class century of the season as he carried his team to 329 for 7 on the first day. Trott continued on the second, and was eventually last out, having shattered his previous highest score and gone on to make 210 before he was bowled by Rana. Warwickshire were thus all out for 475, Mushtaq Ahmed and James Kirtley taking three wickets each, and Warwickshire got a good start with the ball as Makhaya Ntini and Dougie Brown removed an opener each. However, Michael Yardy, Murray Goodwin and Chris Adams all made solid contributions as Sussex moved to 244 for 3 at stumps on day two.

The third day saw a total of sixteen wickets fall, as Sussex came back to dismiss Warwickshire for a low score after giving up a 47-run lead on first innings. Goodwin made 150, his fourth century of the season, as Sussex scored 428, while most of the Warwickshire bowlers got wickets but conceded plenty of runs in the process. Then, Rana set out to repair his poor first innings effort, taking four wickets in 15 overs as Warwickshire could only muster 180 – and that was mostly thanks to a 50-run partnership between Trevor Frost and Brown. Sussex needed 228 to win, but collapsed. Wickets were shared out among the entire Warwickshire team, James Anyon getting the most with four for 33, and Makhaya Ntini, Neil Carter and Alex Loudon also got two each, to see Sussex all out for 126. (Cricinfo scorecard)

=== Hampshire v Warwickshire (30 August – 1 September) ===
Hampshire (22pts) beat Warwickshire (4pts) by an innings and 86 runs

Hampshire dominated proceedings against Warwickshire at The Rose Bowl, occupying the crease for a day and a half to amass 576 runs in their first innings. The top three of James Adams, Sean Ervine and John Crawley set the tone with fifties, and when Crawley departed for 60 the score had moved to 279 for 3. Jonathan Trott and Makhaya Ntini shared three wickets before the end of the day, leaving Hampshire 353 for 6 overnight, but Shane Watson and Dimitri Mascarenhas shared a mammoth 234-run partnership for the seventh wicket. Watson hit a career-best 203 not out, while Mascarenhas took three hours for an unbeaten 102, the first century of his season, before Shaun Udal declared. Warwickshire stumbled early on, falling to 21 for 2, but an unbeaten 97 from Nick Knight lifted them to 145 for 4 at the close of play on day two.

Knight could not save Warwickshire alone, though, and Warwickshire lost sixteen wickets on the third day to crumble to an innings defeat. Knight got his century, ending with 116, but no other batsman passed 30, as they were all out for 258 in the first innings. They were asked to follow on 318 behind, and did rather well initially, getting the score to 110 for 1 after two hours. Then, Jonathan Trott and Ian Westwood fell in quick succession, leaving Jamie Troughton to try and tie together a match-saving innings with the lower order. He made a two-hour 76 before being ninth out, caught off Shaun Udal's bowling, ending Warwickshire's resistance. No further runs were added for the tenth wicket, as Makhaya Ntini was bowled by Udal, and Warwickshire ended on 232 all out – 86 runs short of making Hampshire bat again. Hampshire captain Udal finished with a second innings analysis of 22–8–44–6, after only one wicket in the first innings. The win left Hampshire briefly on top of the Championship, before Nottinghamshire took over the following day. (Cricinfo scorecard)

=== Hampshire v Warwickshire (3 September) ===
Hampshire won by 18 runs and won the C&G Trophy

Hampshire became the third team to win a major county trophy in 2005, as they prevailed in a high-scoring final at Lord's, leaving only the County Championship left for grabs. Nic Pothas and Sean Ervine added 136 runs for the second wicket to propel Hampshire to a big total against Warwickshire, whose bowlers gave away 20 runs from wides but still managed to bowl Hampshire out on the last ball. Ervine was fifth out, taking 91 balls for his second successive C&G century, before he was caught off Jonathan Trott, who finished with three wickets for 35 runs. Neil Carter took five wickets to redeem his 66 conceded runs, while Makhaya Ntini bowled two maiden overs for Warwickshire, but went wicketless.

Warwickshire were set to chase 291 to win, and Carter fulfilled his job as a pinch hitter well, scoring four fours and one six en route to 32, and Nick Knight and Ian Bell kept up with the required run rate well. However, Bell suffered cramps just before he reached 50, and that limited his movements – he succumbed shortly afterwards, chipping a simple catch to Chris Tremlett and was gone for 54. The other batsmen tried to add runs with Knight, but yielded to the Hampshire bowling and fielding effort, and when Knight was finally dismissed for 118 Warwickshire needed 40 runs for the last three wickets. Shane Watson effectively stopped that, having Dougie Brown and Ashley Giles out bowled, leaving Warwickshire to hit about 20 runs in the last over. It was too much for Makhaya Ntini, who was bowled by Chris Tremlett with the second ball of the last over, and thus Hampshire took an 18-run victory. (Cricinfo scorecard)

=== Somerset v Warwickshire (5 September) ===
Somerset (4pts) beat Warwickshire (0pts) by four wickets

Jonathan Trott set up Warwickshire Bears for a big total at Taunton, making 112 not out as Warwickshire eased to 278 for 5, also helped by scores in the 40s from Neil Carter, Nick Knight and Trevor Penney. Somerset Sabres scored quickly in reply, Matthew Wood spending 39 balls for his 53 before being bowled by Trott, but at 187 for 6, the odds were long. However, Will Durston and John Francis added 94 for the seventh wicket, as Somerset won with an over to spare. Warwickshire's opening bowler Dougie Brown only bowled two of a possible nine overs, conceding 23 runs. (Cricinfo scorecard)

=== Warwickshire v Surrey (10–13 September) ===
Warwickshire (10pts) drew with Surrey (8pts)

Almost one and a half days was lost to rain at Edgbaston, but when play finally got underway, Surrey tried their best to force a result – needing a win in this match to avoid losing too much ground to Middlesex in the relegation battle. As a result, seven of the dismissals were outfield catches, as Surrey were bowled out for 225 in the 60 overs possible on day two. Hosts Warwickshire started strongly, Ian Westwood and Nick Knight adding 93 for the first wicket, but Jade Dernbach had two men bowled as Surrey started to eye a hope. Scores of 60 from Alex Loudon and Michael Powell, along with 117 from Knight, saw Warwickshire to 338, a lead of 113. Losing three wickets early, Surrey went on the defensive in order not to lose further points, and 127 from Mark Ramprakash along with solid contributions from Rikki Clarke and wicket-keeper Jonathan Batty lifted them to 313 for 5. Surrey declared when Ramprakash was dismissed, giving Warwickshire 11 overs to bat, and Knight and Westwood batted out without loss to draw the game.

=== Warwickshire v Surrey (14 September) ===
Warwickshire (4pts) beat Surrey (0pts) by 68 runs

Warwickshire Bears hammered the Surrey Lions' bowlers at Edgbaston, which resulted in the Bears recording 292 for 8 batting first. Neil Carter set that pace, taking eleven fours in a blitzing thirty-ball 51 – his fourth half-century in List A cricket. Jade Dernbach had him caught, however, but that did not stop Warwickshire, as Jamie Troughton slashed five sixes and six fours before brothers Tim and Chris Murtagh combined to remove him for 82 – caught Chris, bowled Tim. However, Troughton had added 144 with Jonathan Trott, and not even four late wickets from Rikki Clarke could stop the flow of runs, and both Jade Dernbach and Azhar Mahmood conceded 61 in their nine overs. Surrey had six batsmen going into double figures in their reply, but no partnership was worth 50, as Jamie Anyon and Trott got three wickets each. Extras were the second highest scorer, with 32, behind Clarke's 42. (Cricinfo scorecard)

=== Scotland v Warwickshire (18 September) ===
Warwickshire (4pts) beat Scotland (0pts) by five wickets

Warwickshire Bears kept their promotion hopes alive with a win over Scottish Saltires, although the Scots kept them at bat for 41.4 overs at their home ground, The Grange. Fraser Watts and Ian Stanger both hit half-centuries for Scotland, as the Saltires made their way to 177 for 1, and despite two wickets from Jamie Anyon and the golden duck from West Indian Vasbert Drakes, the Scots ended on 220 for 5. However, Jonathan Trott and Nick Knight shared a swift 109-run stand for the second wicket to see Warwickshire to 151 for 1, and Knight made his 29th List A century as Warwickshire won by five wickets. Drakes, playing in his first match for Scotland, got two wickets for 30 on Scotland debut, while Ian Stanger got two for 26. (Cricinfo scorecard)

=== Warwickshire v Yorkshire (20 September) ===
Warwickshire (4pts) beat Yorkshire (0pts) by 102 runs

Yorkshire Phoenix conceded 309 for 3 after winning the toss and fielding first at Edgbaston despite Scotsman John Blain taking two early wickets to leave the hosts Warwickshire Bears at 49 for 2. Jonathan Trott and Ian Bell struck 216 runs together, with Bell being the most destructive – he hit eight fours and five sixes in an 84-ball century, and added a further 37 before Yorkshire wicket-keeper Simon Guy finally had him stumped. With Jamie Troughton smacking three sixes and two fours in a 13-ball 34, Warwickshire made 309 for 3 in their 45 overs, the sixth highest total in Division Two this season. Yorkshire attempted the chase, with Michael Wood and Anthony McGrath hitting at just under a run a ball, but after McGrath's dismissal Yorkshire lost five wickets for 34, and only just managed to bat out their 45 overs, scoring 207 for 9. Alex Loudon and Neil Carter took three wickets each. (Cricinfo scorecard)

=== Warwickshire v Gloucestershire (21–24 September) ===
Warwickshire (18pts) beat Gloucestershire (3pts) by 181 runs

Warwickshire came back from 18 for 3 and then 90 for 5 to win their last Championship game of the season. A two-hour partnership yielding 70 runs between Jamie Troughton and Trevor Frost took Warwickshire past 150, before Sri Lankan Malinga Bandara removed four of the last five wickets, and Warwickshire ended on 208 all out. However, early wickets taken by Neil Carter and Dougie Brown sent Gloucestershire to 29 for 3 at the close of play on day one. Warwickshire continued to chip away on the second day, as five bowlers shared the remaining seven wickets, and Gloucestershire were bowled out for 118. South African-born first class debutant Grant Hodnett was the only one to pass 20 for Gloucestershire, taking three hours before falling one short of a half-century on debut. Ian Westwood did manage a fifty, hitting 55 in a 94-run stand with Nick Knight, and Warwickshire closed on 197 for 3. Despite four wickets from Malinga Bandara, Warwickshire managed 320 for 9 before declaring.

Gloucestershire attempted to chase a total of 411 to win, but after an opening stand of 80 Naqqash Tahir removed both openers in quick succession, and Gloucestershire closed on 97 for 2. Off spinner Alex Loudon then celebrated his call-up to the England team to tour Pakistan the following winter by taking six for 66 as Gloucestershire were bowled out for 229. (Cricinfo scorecard)

=== Warwickshire v Durham (25 September) ===
Durham (4pts) beat Warwickshire (0pts) by eight wickets on the Duckworth-Lewis method

Early wickets and few runs early on meant that Warwickshire Bears posted 187 for 8 at their home ground, Edgbaston. Australian Brad Williams took two wickets for the Durham Dynamos, as Warwickshire lost their first four wickets for 43, and despite a run-a-ball 48 from number 8 Dougie Brown, Warwickshire never got the run rate up above 4.5 an over. Durham lost Gordon Muchall for 3, but half-centuries from Australian Jimmy Maher and England all-rounder Paul Collingwood put Durham to a score of 135 for 2, and Durham passed the revised target of 154 with 17 balls to spare. (Cricinfo scorecard)
