= MCC in 2005 =

Marylebone Cricket Club
2005 season
- Ground(s): Lord's

The MCC (Marylebone Cricket Club) in 2005 started the season fielding what was virtually an England A side against the Champion County, which they won. MCC teams played around 450 games throughout the season, although only two of them involved senior professional players:

== MCC v Warwickshire (8–11 April) ==
MCC won by 7 wickets

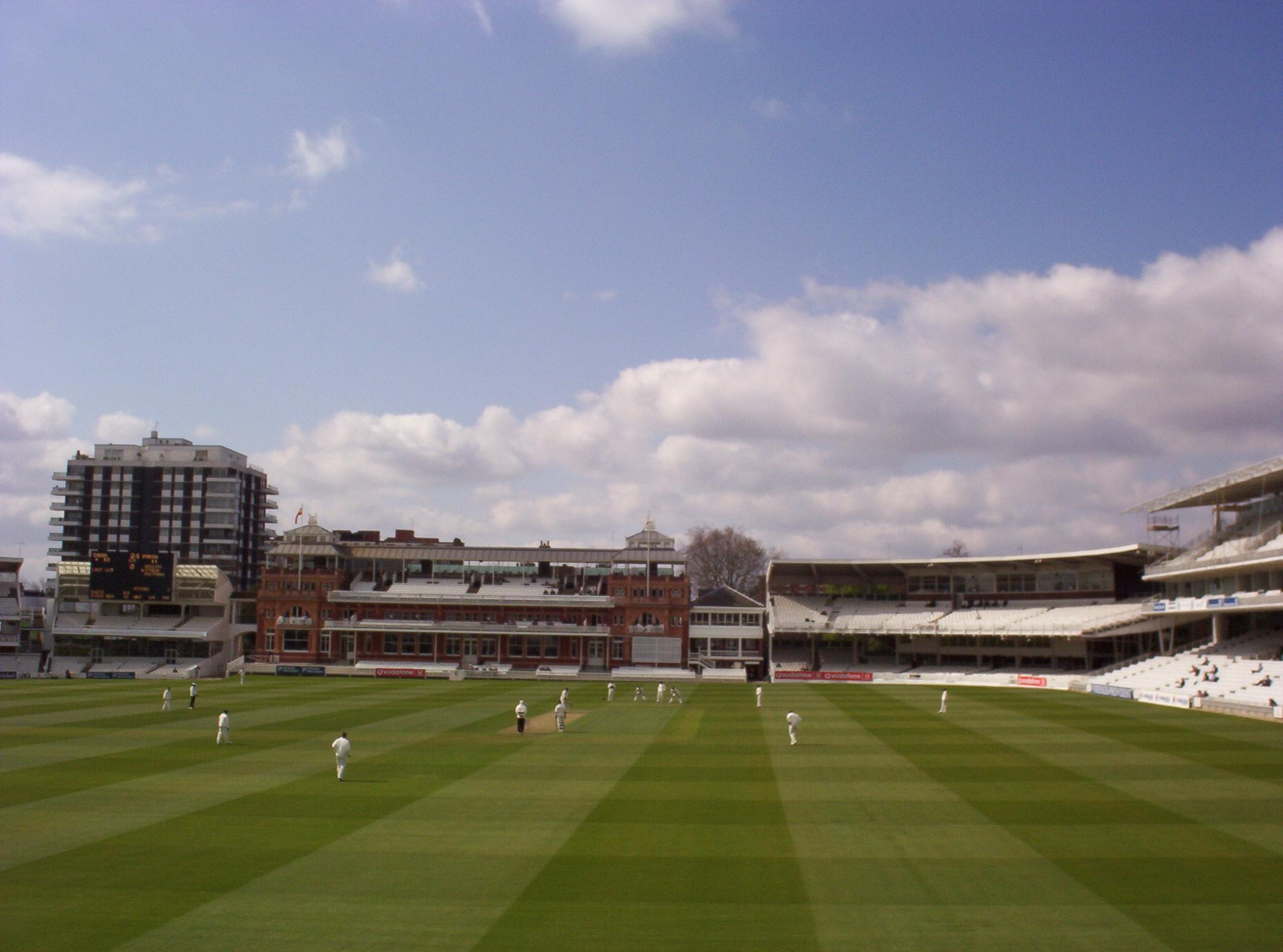
Heath Streak of Warwickshire about to bowl to Cook on 10 April.

Warwickshire were the Champion County in 2004, and therefore they kicked off the 2005 season with the traditional match against the MCC at Lord's on 8 April. The MCC side was effectively an "England A" team, with the match being the closest thing to a Test trial this season. It rained on and off throughout the first day. Just before 5pm, the captains tossed. Nick Knight won the toss for Warwickshire and elected to bat. However, more rain came down and at around 5pm play was abandoned - the first day of the 2005 cricket season would see no play.

The second day saw 87 overs of play before bad light ended the day's play. Warwickshire put on 347 for 5 declared. Nick Knight's 115 was the first century of the season. Wagh contributed 66 and Trott 75. The third day started with a confident and chanceless first wicket partnership of 109 between Alastair Cook and Matt Prior. Then Cook, who grafted out his innings with careful footwork and plenty of off-side shots, and Owais Shah, who got off to a difficult start, put on 166 runs for the second wicket, before Cook fell for 120. The MCC declared soon after at 275 for 2, 70 runs behind. Warwickshire started their second innings confidently, and were 70 for 3 at close on the third day.

On the fourth and last day, Warwickshire powered on to 225 for 4 before declaring, with Tony Frost top scoring with 91. This set the MCC a target of 296 to win. On a wicket that held up well, Cook added 97 to his first innings century. By the time he was third out at 235, Andy Flower was well set. He scored an undefeated 110 as the hosts won by 7 wickets with eight overs to spare. The MCC remain undefeated in the traditional game against the previous season's traditional county since the fixture was re-established in 1970. The match leaves Prior and Cook in contention for possible future England call-ups.

== MCC v International XI (14 June) ==
MCC won by 112 runs

In a charity match at Lord's, Brian Lara came to regret the decision to bowl first, although the match was hardly to be taken seriously. Andy Flower, the old Zimbabwe stalwart, made a quickfire 55 near the end of the innings, Stephen Fleming smashed some lovely cover drives on his way to a 46-ball fifty before edging Makhaya Ntini to third man for 62, and Jacques Kallis also made 62 as he paired up well with VVS Laxman. The deep batting order, aided by Lara's willingness to utilise his bowlers - the pick of the International XI, Chaminda Vaas, who utilised the English conditions as he took two for 19, only got to bowl seven overs, while Lara himself bowled two and the International XI used all their available bowlers - and the MCC made 327 for 7.

In reply, the International XI got off to a blazing start, as Sanath Jayasuriya and Graeme Smith lifted them to 65 for 1 after ten overs. With Lara coming in at four and looking settled, things looked good, but the wheels fell off in their chase of the massive total. Lara charged Anil Kumble to Shoaib Akhtar for 42, no other International batsman passed 20, and the team crumbled to 189 for 7 - Smith stumped for 68. Chris Gayle redeemed his poor batting effort by removing the tail, and the International XI were all out for 215.
