= Jonathan Trott =

English cricketer (born 1981)

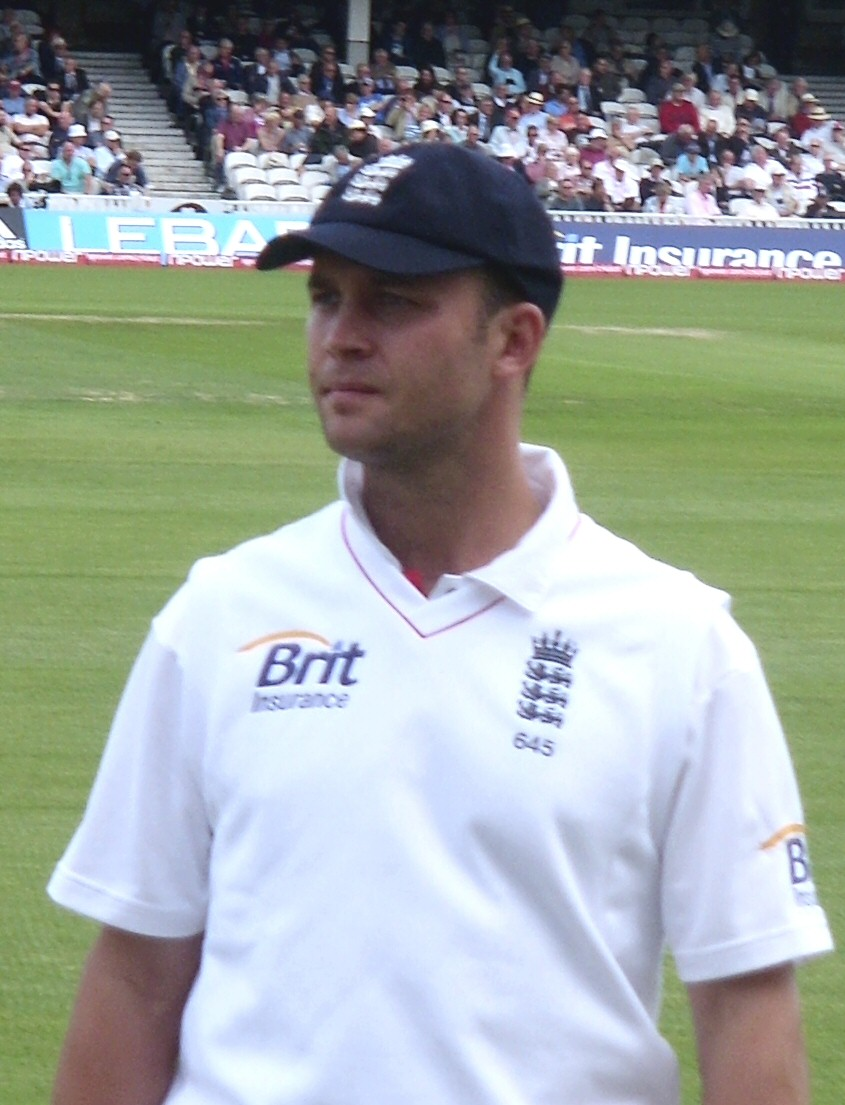
- Trott playing for England in 2010

Personal information
- Full name: Ian Jonathan Leonard Trott
- Born: 22 April 1981 (age 45); Cape Town, Cape Province, South Africa
- Height: 6 ft 0 in (1.83 m)
- Batting: Right-handed
- Bowling: Right-arm medium
- Role: Batsman
- Relatives: Kenny Jackson (half-brother); Tom Dollery (grandfather-in-law)

International information
- National side: England (2007–2015)
- Test debut (cap 645): 20 August 2009 v Australia
- Last Test: 1 May 2015 v West Indies
- ODI debut (cap 211): 27 August 2009 v Ireland
- Last ODI: 14 September 2013 v Australia
- ODI shirt no.: 4
- T20I debut (cap 29): 28 June 2007 v West Indies
- Last T20I: 20 February 2010 v Pakistan

Domestic team information
- Years: Team
- 2000/01: Boland
- 2001/02: Western Province
- 2003–2018: Warwickshire (squad no. 9)
- 2005/06: Otago

Head coaching information
- Years: Team
- 2022–2026: Afghanistan

Career statistics
Competition	Test	ODI	FC	LA
Matches	52	68	281	274
Runs scored	3,835	2,819	18,662	10,056
Batting average	44.08	51.25	44.32	48.11
100s/50s	9/19	4/22	46/92	23/67
Top score	226	137	226	137
Balls bowled	708	183	6,206	1,788
Wickets	5	2	70	58
Bowling average	80.00	83.00	49.81	29.31
5 wickets in innings	0	0	1	0
10 wickets in match	0	0	0	0
Best bowling	1/5	2/31	7/39	4/55
Catches/stumpings	29/–	14/–	223/–	77/–
- Source: ESPNcricinfo, 29 September 2018

Ian Jonathan Leonard Trott (born 22 April 1981) is an English former professional cricketer who played international cricket for the England cricket team and is the former head coach of the Afghanistan cricket team. Domestically, he played for Warwickshire County Cricket Club as well as playing in South Africa and New Zealand. He was ICC and ECB Cricketer of the Year in 2011.

A right-handed top-order batsman and occasional medium-pace bowler, he played two Twenty20 Internationals for England in 2007. Good performances for his county in 2008 and 2009, as well as a productive tour in 2008–09 with the England Lions, led to a call-up to the senior England Test squad in August 2009 for the fifth Ashes Test. He scored a century in that Test, becoming the 18th England player to do so on his Test debut. 18 months later, he scored another century at the MCG to set up the victory which saw England retain the Ashes. His highest England score in a Test match is 226, made against Bangladesh at Lord's on 28 May 2010, and he took his first Test wicket in the same match. He often fields at slip, particularly to the spinners.

Citing stress and anxiety, Trott left England's Ashes tour of Australia in November 2013, with the intention of taking a break from all forms of cricket. A comeback attempt in April 2014 was shelved due to a recurrence of the condition. Trott returned to the England team for the 2015 West Indies Test series, but after struggling in the series, he retired from all international cricket on 4 May 2015. In May 2018, Trott announced he would retire from professional cricket at the end of the English domestic cricket season. In July 2022, Trott was named as the new head coach of the Afghanistan cricket team.

== Personal life ==
Trott was born in Cape Town to a South African family of English descent. The Cricket Monthly reported that "His grandfather was born in London and never lost his cockney accent. During the 1995 Rugby World Cup in South Africa, a seminal moment in the nascent democracy under former president Nelson Mandela, the Trotts supported England". By virtue of his grandfather's British citizenship, Trott was eligible for a British passport from birth. Educated at Rondebosch Boys' High School, Stellenbosch University, and a resident of Helshoogte Manskoshuis in Stellenbosch, he played for South Africa at both under-15 and under-19 level.

In April 2009, he married Warwickshire's press officer Abi Dollery, granddaughter of former Warwickshire captain Tom Dollery.

His half-brother, Kenny Jackson, represented the Netherlands and Western Province.

== Domestic cricket ==
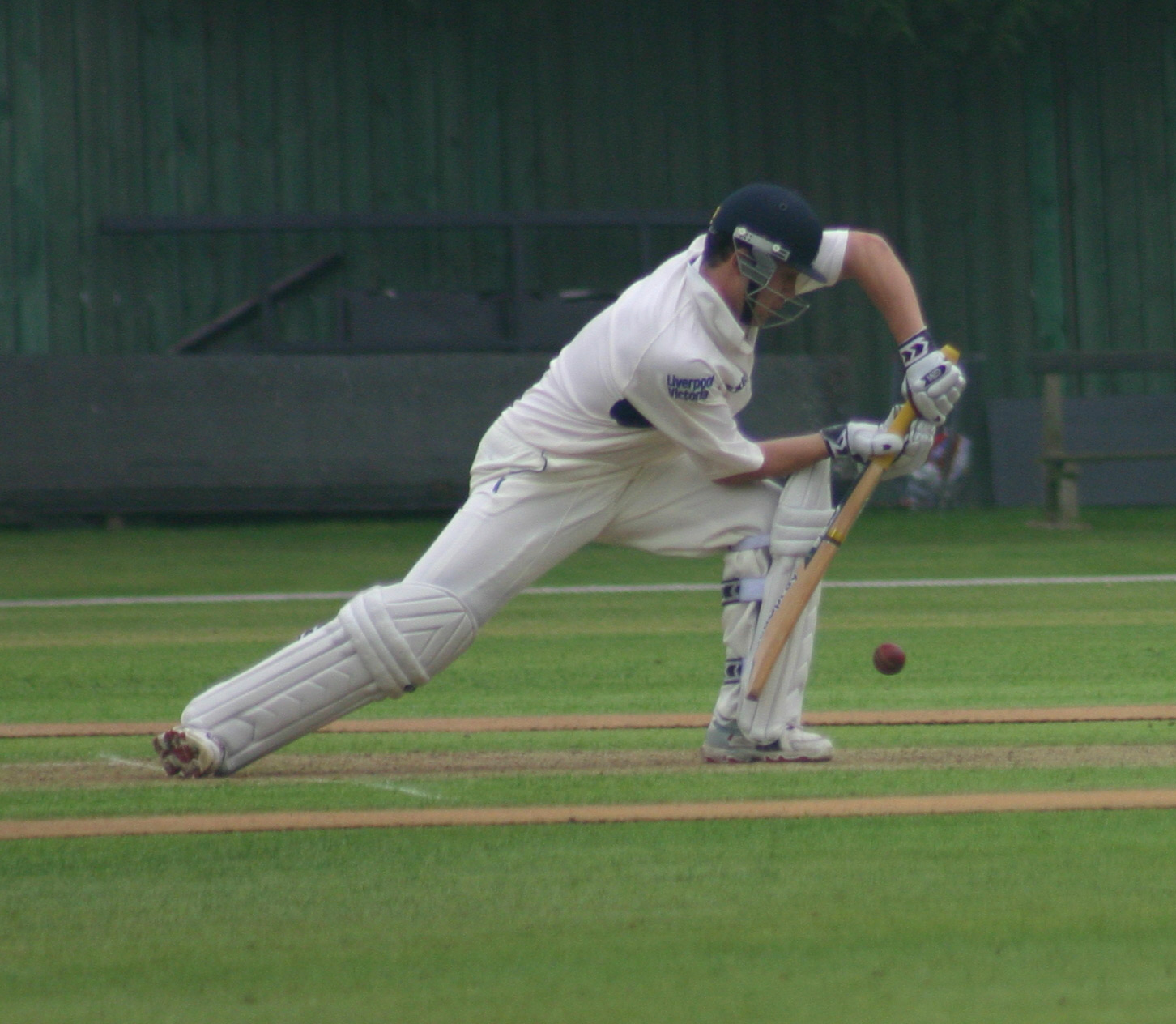
Jonathan Trott batting for Warwickshire against Cambridge UCCE, at Fenner's cricket ground in Cambridge, 15 April 2006.

As he holds a British passport, Trott is not considered an overseas player in county cricket. On his Warwickshire second-XI debut in 2002, he compiled a record score of 245; the following year he scored 134 on County Championship debut for Warwickshire, and in the same season claimed a haul of 7 for 39 with his occasional seam bowling, his only first-class five-wicket haul.

Trott hit four first-class centuries for Warwickshire during the 2005 season, bettering his previous career best to 152 against Glamorgan before taking it to 210 against Sussex three weeks later. His 1,161 first-class runs of 2005 was the second-highest tally of the Warwickshire season, only behind Nick Knight. Before his first international Test call-up, Trott had hit 8,121 first-class runs at an average of just under 44.

== International cricket ==
=== Early career ===
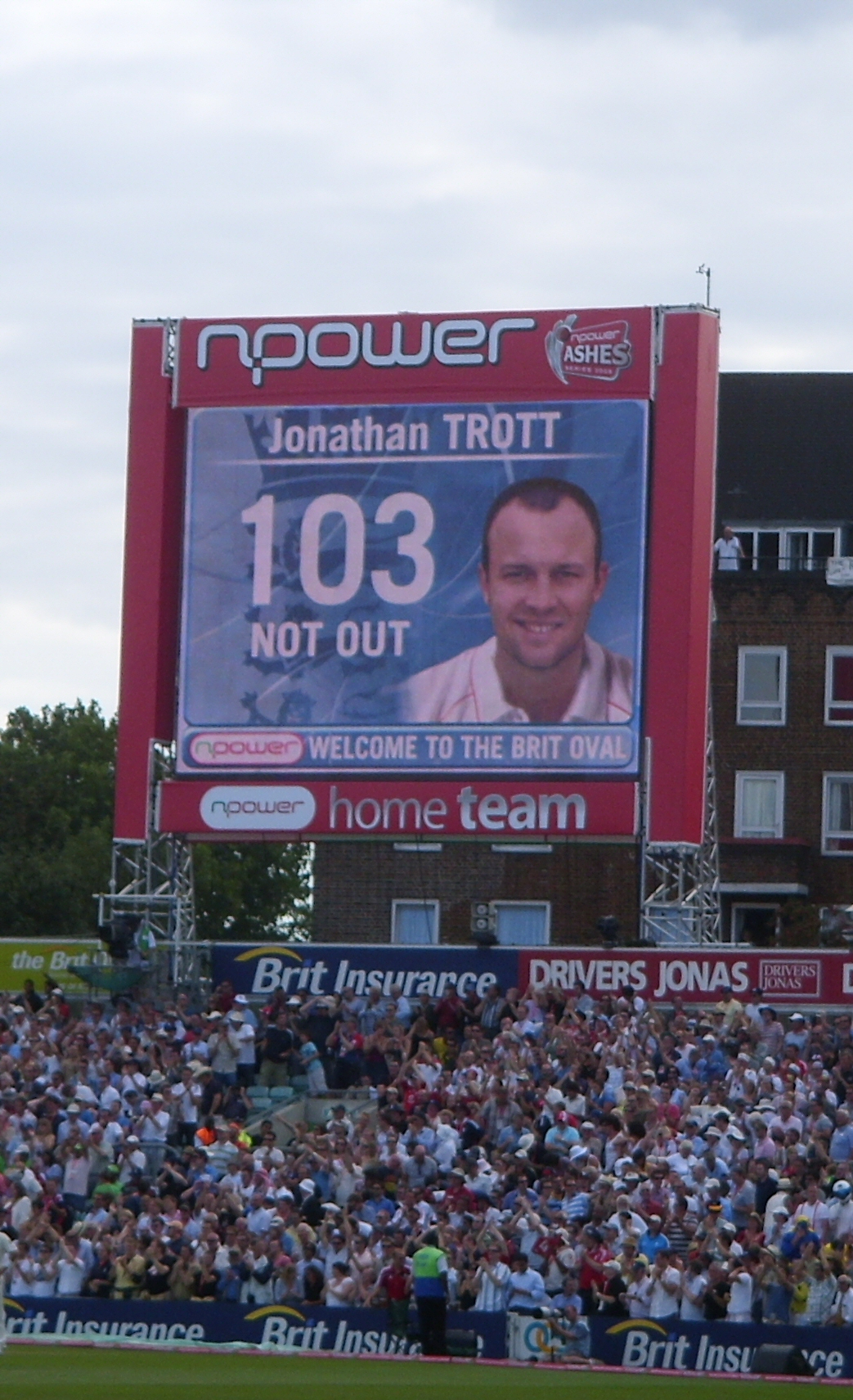
Trott's maiden Test century

Although he played for South Africa at U19 level, Trott was eligible to play for England as a result of his grandparents being English. Following a good season in 2007 he was selected in June 2007 for England's one day squad for the series against the West Indies. He was given the nickname Leon, after Marxist theorist Leon Trotsky by the England team. Trott shook off a hand injury and played in both Twenty20 Internationals against the West Indies but failed to contribute in double figures and the series ended 1–1.

On 4 August 2009, during a strong county season for Warwickshire during which he was averaging over 97, it was announced that Trott would be included in the 14-man Ashes squad, to play 2009 Ashes against Australia in the fourth Test at Headingley. Trott did not feature in that match, but was then named in the team for the decisive Ashes Test at the Oval and made his debut. Trott batted solidly during the first innings, scoring 41 runs before being run out by Simon Katich. He scored 119 in the second innings, becoming the 18th England player to score a hundred on debut, the first to do so against Australia since Graham Thorpe in 1993, and the highest scoring Warwickshire batsman on Test debut. England went on to win the Test, and the Ashes series. After that Test Series, Tottenham Hotspur, the football team he has always supported, gave him a signed shirt by Harry Redknapp to congratulate him on winning the Ashes and a Test century.

Trott was then selected to play in the rain-affected two-match Twenty20 International matches, although the weather prevented him from playing any more than a scoreless four deliveries. He was not selected for the ODI series, returning to Warwickshire to score 93 against Worcestershire, though on 11 September it was announced that he had been awarded an "incremental contract" with England.

Trott earned selection for the tour to South Africa winter of 2009/10, thanks to his Ashes efforts and his batting form which helped Warwickshire to the Second Division 2009 Pro40 title. However, on the eve of the tour former captain Michael Vaughan announced in his biography his disappointment in seeing Trott celebrating with the South Africa national cricket team after their victory over England the previous year. Trott rejected the claims, and was supported by captain Andrew Strauss. Both were disappointed by Vaughan's comments.

In the second One Day International in South Africa at Centurion Park, Trott was promoted to open the innings alongside Strauss and he responded by producing an innings of 87, that along with a century from Paul Collingwood, with whom he shared a substantial partnership, helped England win the game.

=== 2010 ===
Trott then toured Bangladesh in early 2010 for two away Tests, followed by two home Tests against the same nation. While in Bangladesh, he had a quiet series. In the first of the home series however, at Lords on 28 May, he scored his second Test century – a career best 226 and took his first test wicket. After his double century at Lord's, Trott scored just three runs in the second and final Test at Old Trafford.

Trott's next international match was against Bangladesh in the second of three ODIs. This was a historic match as Bangladesh, despite a gutsy 94 from 130 deliveries from Trott, defeated England for the first time in any form of the game. After this defeat however, England fought back to win the series in the third ODI in which Trott scored 110 off 121 deliveries and he shared in a second-wicket stand of 250 along with England captain Andrew Strauss. This stand helped England up to a massive 347 for 7 in their 50 overs.

Pakistan toured England in 2010 for England's final series of the summer. England won the first two games with ease, by 354 runs and 9 wickets respectively, with Trott making two half-centuries in the second. After losing the third Test, England and Trott fought back in the final Test at Lord's. After seeing England collapse to 102–7 in their first innings, Trott scored 184 to see England to 446 all out. This included a Test record eighth-wicket partnership of 332 with Stuart Broad, who scored a similarly notable 169. That stand was the turning point in the match as it turned a near-disaster into a solid innings performance that allowed top-form English bowling and fielding to dismantle Pakistan and earn an innings victory. Trott was named England's Man of the Series for his strong batting performance during the series.

In the ODI series Trott made 69 in the opening match to help England win by 24 runs. He continued his good form into the next match and made it back to back fifties as England won by four wickets to go 2–0 up in the series. Trott could only make two in the next match as Pakistan won to keep the series alive. He was dismissed for four in the next match as Pakistan levelled the series going into the decider. Trott could only make three in the final game, but good performance from teammates Eoin Morgan and Paul Collingwood ensured England won by 121 runs to win the series 3–2.

In the drawn 1st Test of the 2010–11 Ashes at the Gabba, Trott scored 135 not out in England's second innings in an unbeaten second wicket partnership of 329 with Alastair Cook who recorded a Test Match record innings at the Gabba of 235 not out. Trott's century meant he scored centuries in successive Test Matches against Australia following his 119 at The Oval in the 5th Test of the 2009 Ashes in England.

In the second Test, Trott ran-out Simon Katich in the first over of the match to start a top-order collapse which saw Australia lose 3 wickets for just 2 runs. He then made 78 off 144 balls in a partnership with Alastair Cook in the first innings, contributing notably to England's 620–5d and eventual innings victory.

He continued his fine form against Australia with a century at the MCG in the fourth Test. After England bowled Australia out for just 98, he scored his third century against them (his fifth overall in Test cricket). Ably supported by Kevin Pietersen (51) and Matt Prior (85), Trott finished not out on 168 as England were bowled out for 513. England won by an innings and 157 runs to retain the Ashes, and Trott was named Man of the Match.

Having played his sixth Test against Australia, he now averaged 86.42 against them and 61.53 in all Test cricket, and had scored centuries in the two matches that won and retained the Ashes for England.

=== 2011 ===
Following the Ashes, Trott played 7 ODIs against Australia. Although England lost the series 6–1, he scored two centuries which meant he went to the 2011 World Cup as England's most in-form one-day batsman.

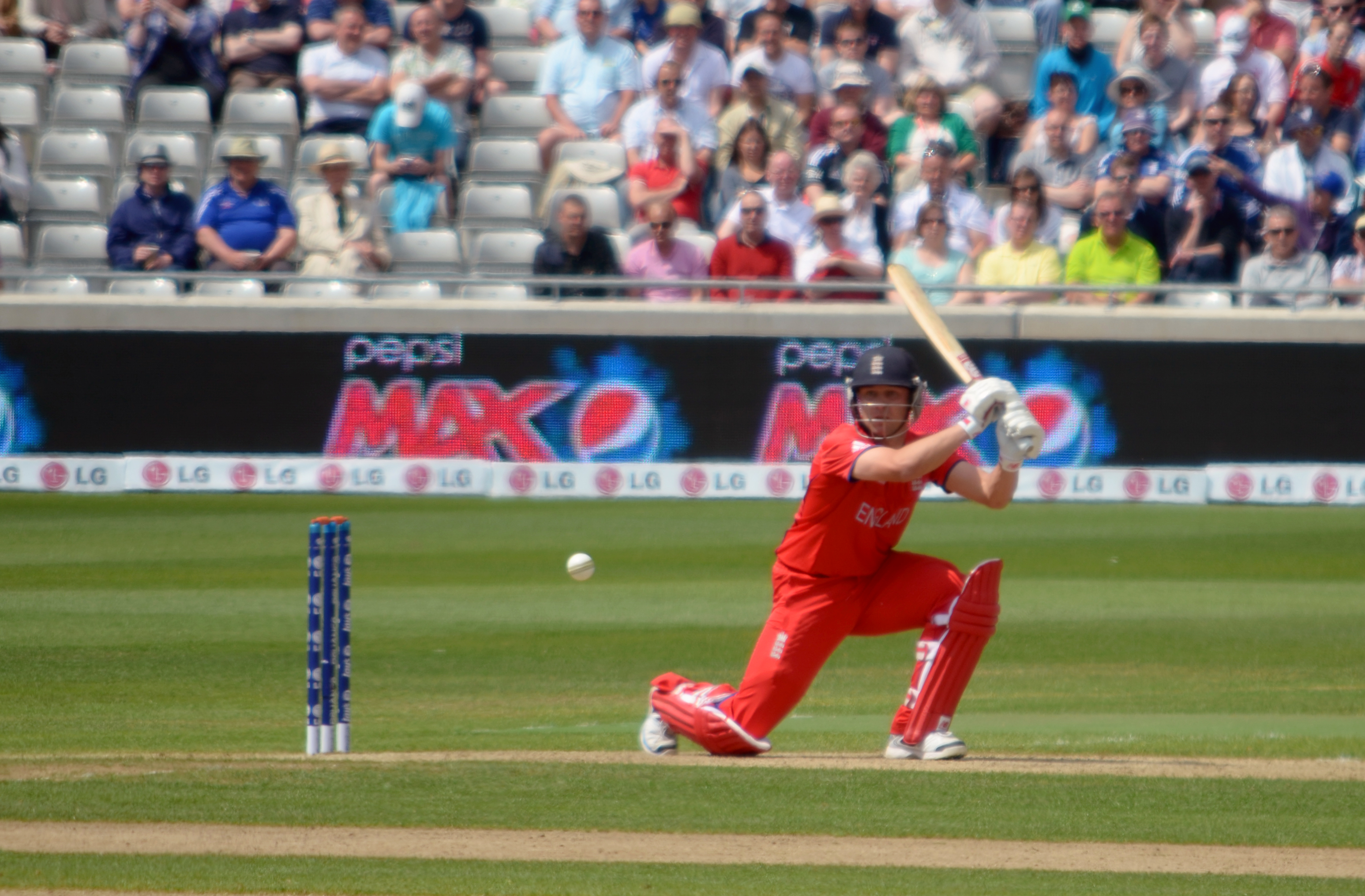
Trott batting during the 2013 Champions Trophy

Although Trott did not score any further centuries, he did score five half-centuries as England reached the quarter-finals where they lost by 10 wickets to Sri Lanka. He made 62 in the first game against the Netherlands to help England win by six wickets. Although he only made 16 in the next game against India, he scored 92 against Ireland. Despite this knock, England suffered a surprise three wicket defeat. England bounced back to beat South Africa, with Trott again making a significant contribution to the innings, this time making 52. He made another half century against Bangladesh but England were again embarrassed by lesser opposition as they lost by two wickets. After making 47 against the West Indies, Trott made 82 against Sri Lanka, but England lost to exit he tournament. A total of 422 runs meant Trott was the tournament's top run scorer when England departed. In addition to the 459 runs he scored against Australia, his World Cup haul saw him reach fifth place in the ICC ODI player rankings. He was named in the 'Team of the Tournament' by ESPNcricinfo.

Sri Lanka toured England in May and June in 2011. In the first Test in Cardiff, Trott participated in of partnerships of 251 and 160 on his way to making 203, his second Test double-century, thereby increasing his batting average to 66.77. This score of 203, set the highest individual score by an English player against Sri Lanka, breaking Graham Gooch's score of 174. England went on to win the match by an innings and 14 runs to take a 1–0 lead in the series. In the next Test he made 58 runs in the second innings of the match. He also took a rare wicket in Sri Lanka's second innings, but England could not force a result and the match ended in a draw. The third Test ended in a draw, with Trott only batting once and failing to make double figures. England won the series 1–0.

He made scores of 23 and 39 in the first two ODI internationals between the two teams. This left the series poised at 1–1 after England won the first game and Sri Lanka the second. England lost the third ODI by 6 wickets, with Trott making just two. He was not required to bat in the next match of the series as England romped to a ten wicket victory. He made 72 in the final match of the series as England won by 16 runs to win the series 3–2.

Trott starred in the 4–0 Test series victory over India which took England to the world No.1 spot. Trott hit 70 in the first match as England won by 196 runs. Trott picked up an injury in the second Test, and batted at No.7 in the second innings. The injury ruled Trott out of the third test, which England won, meaning that after the series they would become the world's best Test Team. Trott was unable to take part in the fourth test due to the injury, with the selectors not willing to risk him with the series already won. Trott made his return form injury in the third ODI international, making 11. In the final ODI he made 63 to guide England to victory and give them an impressive 3–0 series win.

=== 2011/12: Pakistan and Sri Lanka ===
In their first series as the number one Test Team, England played Pakistan in the UAE. Trott top scored with 49 in England's second innings as England lost the match after being bowled out for 160. Trott made 72 in the second Test but it was not enough to prevent another defeat. England went on to lose the series 3–0. Trott was out for a first ball duck in the first ODI international, although England went on to win the game. Trott did not pass fifty in the four match series, but England went on to win it 4–0.

In 2012 England played Sri Lanka. They lost the first game after a poor batting performance in the first innings. Despite this, Trott made 112 in the second innings, but a lack of support meant that England could not chase down their target. England won the second test to draw the series, with Trott making 64 in the first innings to help to set up a comfortable win. The win meant that England held onto their status as the number one ranked Test team.

=== 2012: West Indies ===
Trott made 58 in the first Test against the West Indies, a game which England went on to win by 5 wickets. Trott made 35 and 17 not out in the second Test, as England won by 9 wickets and went 2–0 up in the series. The final match was rain-affected an ended in a draw. Trott made 42 in the first ODI to help England get off to a winning start in the limited overs series. He then made an unbeaten 42 in the second ODI to give England an unassailable series lead with just one game left to play. The final match of the series was abandoned due to bad weather, meaning England won the series 2–0.

=== 2012: South Africa ===
In the first Test against South Africa, Trott made 71 during a 170 run partnership with Alistair Cook. Despite this putting England in a strong position to win the game, England were bowled out in the second innings as South Africa took a 1–0 series lead. Trot made scores of 35 and 30 in the second test, which ended in a draw. This meant that England had to win the decider to keep hold of their number one ranking. Trott made a half century in the second innings as England tried to chase down 345, but they fell short and South Africa won the series 2–0. After making 23 in England's defeat in the first ODI, Trott made 73 in the third to level the series at 1–1. Trott helped England chase down 221 to win the fourth game and give England a 2–1 series lead. Trott did not play in the final match, which South Africa won to level the series at 2–2.

=== 2012/13: India ===
Following the defeat to South Africa, captain Andrew Strauss retired, breaking up the top three of Strauss, Cook and Trott. Cook took over the captaincy ahead of the series against India. England lost the first match, as Trott made just 17 runs in the game. England won the second match by 10 wickets, although Trott made a duck in the first innings. Trott scored 87 in the third test as England won the match to take a 2–1 series lead. Trott made 143 in the final test to guide England to a draw and give them a historic win on Indian soil.

=== 2013: New Zealand ===
In the first ODI of the tour of New Zealand, Trott made 68 but New Zealand won the match by 3 wickets. In the second match Trott made an unbeaten 65 as England levelled the series. England won the final match to win the series 2–1, with Trott making 38. In the first Test match, Trott made scores of 45 and 52 as the match ended in a draw. The second match went the same way, with Trott making 121 as England scored 465 in the first innings. Although they enforced the follow on they were unable to bowl New Zealand out for a second time. Trott made 27 and 37 in the final test which again ended in a draw, meaning the series finished 0–0.

=== 2013: ICC Champions Trophy ===
Trott was selected in the England squad for the 2013 ICC Champions Trophy, and made 43 as England won their opening game against Australia. Trott made 76 in the next game against Sri Lanka, although the opposition easily chased down the target of 293. England won their must win match against New Zealand to book their place in the semi-finals. Here they beat South Africa, with Trott making an unbeaten 82. However England lost a low scoring rain affected final against India. England's batsmen failed to chase down 130, with Trott being stumped on 20, meaning England finished runners up.

He was also named as part of the 'Team of the Tournament' by the ICC and ESPNcricinfo.

=== 2013: New Zealand ===
In the two match return test series against New Zealand, Trott made 39 and 56 in the first match as England took a 1–0 lead. England went on to win the series 2–0, with Trott scoring 76 in the second innings of the match. Trott made 30 in the first game of the ODI series. He followed this up with an unbeaten 109 in the second match, but England still went on to lose to give New Zealand a 2–0 series lead. Trott made 37 in the final match of the series as England won to end the series on a positive note.

=== 2013/14: Back to Back Ashes Series ===
Trott made a score of 48 in the first innings of the first Test of the 2013 Ashes series. However, he was dismissed for a duck in the second innings. Despite this, England went on to win the game and take the lead in the series. He made 58 in the first innings of the second match. In the next Test he made 49 in the first innings to help England reach 238. England went on to win the Test by 74 runs which meant they took a 3–0 series lead and won the Ashes. This marked Trott's third Ashes success. In the final match of the series he scored 40 in the first innings and 59 in the second as England came close to chasing down Australia's target, although bad light ended the game and the series, with England winning 3–0.

In the return series in Australia Trott made 19 runs in the first Test at Brisbane, before returning home due to a stress related illness. In his autobiography, he cites his increasing struggles facing the short ball as a principal cause of his problems: "I felt I was being questioned as a man. I felt my dignity was being stripped away with every short ball I ducked or parried. It was degrading."

=== 2015: West Indies ===
Following a successful winter with the England Lions, Trott was named in England's squad for the tour of the West Indies. He played as opening batsman in the three-Test series. He struggled in the first Test, scoring only 0 and 4 in a match that ended in a draw. In the second Test he took advantage of favourable conditions in the first innings, making 59 in a 125-run opening partnership with Cook. It was England's first century opening partnership since March 2013. However, in the second innings he failed to trouble the scoreboard, getting bowled on the third ball he faced. England went on to win the match anyway, going 1–0 up in the series. The series ended in Barbados with a West Indies win, finishing the series 1–1. In this final match, Trott scored 0 and 9, which was one of three ducks Trott scored in his 6 innings in this series. The following day he announced his retirement from international cricket, while stating that he wished to continue playing for Warwickshire. In 15 December Trott joined Edgbaston HC on a part-time basis.

== Statistics, honours and achievements ==
Trott scored nine Test and four one-day centuries for England.

=== Other achievements ===
- Ashes winner: 2009, 2010/11, 2013
- 18th English cricket player to make a century on Test debut (5th Ashes Test, 2009)
- World record 8th wicket partnership in Test Cricket of 332 (with Stuart Broad v Pakistan at Lord's, 2010)
- Joint 1st in the quickest players to get to 1000 One Day International runs (21 matches) with Viv Richards and Kevin Pietersen
- Wisden Cricketer of the Year 2011
- Highest score for an English batsman against Sri Lanka 203 (29 May 2011)
- Awarded England Cricketer of the Year for 2011
- Awarded ICC Cricketer of the Year for 2011
- Most test runs without hitting a six (23 March 2013)
