= Kenny Jackson (cricketer) =

Zambian-born South African cricketer (born 1964)

Kenneth Conrad Jackson (born August 16, 1964, in Kitwe) is a former first class cricketer. Jackson was born in Zambia but played the majority of his cricket in South Africa with Boland, having previously played for Western Province with whom he spent his first three seasons. He is the half brother of England former international cricketer Jonathan Trott.

In 1999, Jackson played one day cricket for the Netherlands. In February 2020, he was named in South Africa's squad for the Over-50s Cricket World Cup in South Africa. However, the tournament was cancelled during the third round of matches due to the coronavirus pandemic.
