= Dewald Pretorius =

South African cricketer (born 1977)

Cricket information
- Batting: Right-handed
- Bowling: Right-arm fast

International information
- National side: South Africa
- Test debut: 8 March 2002 v Australia
- Last Test: 21 August 2003 v England

Career statistics
| Competition | Test | First-class |
|---|---|---|
| Matches | 4 | 67 |
| Runs scored | 22 | 508 |
| Batting average | 7.33 | 9.76 |
| 100s/50s | 0/0 | 0/0 |
| Top score | 9 | 43 |
| Balls bowled | 570 | 11,413 |
| Wickets | 6 | 231 |
| Bowling average | 71.66 | 27.40 |
| 5 wickets in innings | 0 | 7 |
| 10 wickets in match | 0 | 0 |
| Best bowling | 4/115 | 6/49 |
| Catches/stumpings | 0/– | 16/– |
- Source: Cricinfo, 13 November 2022

Dewald Pretorius (born 6 December 1977) is a South African cricketer. He is a right-arm fast bowler who debuted for the South Africa national cricket team in the second Test against Australia during the 2001/2002 series. He has not featured regularly for his country and has played only four Tests, last appearing in the fourth Test against England in 2003. Pretorius has also played, at county level, for the English sides Durham and Warwickshire, where he recorded career best List A figures of five wickets for 32 runs against Kent.

Pretorius achieved some notoriety during UK coverage of South Africa's 2003 Test series with England, because of his rather difficult and troubled childhood. The high point of his career came in the first Test of that tour (Pretorius' second Test), when in successive overs during a hostile spell he removed Michael Vaughan caught behind for 156 and clean bowled Alec Stewart for 38 with an in-swinging yorker, en route to career-best Test innings figures of 4–115.
