= Naqaash Tahir =

English cricketer

Personal information
- Full name: Naqaash Sarosh Tahir
- Born: 14 November 1983 (age 42); Birmingham, West Midlands, England
- Nickname: Naq
- Batting: Right-handed
- Bowling: Right-arm fast-medium
- Role: Bowler

Domestic team information
- Years: Team
- 2012: Lancashire
- 2004–2011: Warwickshire

Career statistics
Competition	FC	List A
Matches	56	16
Runs scored	751	19
Batting average	15.32	9.50
100s/50s	0/1	0/0
Top score	53	13*
Balls bowled	7,677	571
Wickets	139	6
Bowling average	29.94	81.16
5 wickets in innings	2	0
10 wickets in match	0	–
Best bowling	7/107	2/47
Catches/stumpings	7/–	1/–
- Source: Cricinfo, 31 March 2013

Naqaash Sarosh Tahir (born 14 November 1983) is an English cricketer. He is a right-arm fast-medium bowler who has played for Lancashire and Warwickshire. He made his first-class debut for Warwickshire in 2004.

After a promising start to his career, his progress was hindered by injuries over the next few years leaving him out of the first team for extended periods. He was approached by Worcestershire to join them after the 2009 season but instead, following a return to form and an extended run in the first team, was offered and accepted a new two-year contract with Warwickshire with the option of a third year subject to fitness. Warwickshire released Tahir after the end of the 2011 season. Derbyshire offered him a contract but Tahir chose to sign a one-year contract with Lancashire who won the County Championship in 2011.
