= Neil Carter (cricketer) =

South African cricketer

Personal information
- Full name: Neil Miller Carter
- Born: 29 January 1975 (age 51); Cape Town, Cape Province, South Africa
- Nickname: Carts
- Height: 6 ft 2 in (1.88 m)
- Batting: Left-handed
- Bowling: Left-arm medium-fast
- Role: Allrounder

International information
- National side: Scotland (2013-2013)
- T20I debut (cap 29): 3 March 2013 v Afghanistan
- Last T20I: 5 July 2013 v Kenya

Domestic team information
- Years: Team
- 2001–2012: Warwickshire (squad no. 7)

Career statistics
Competition	T20I	FC	LA	T20
Matches	3	111	181	102
Runs scored	3	2,989	2,970	1,531
Batting average	3.00	22.81	22.16	16.46
100s/50s	0/0	1/13	3/13	0/2
Top score	3	103	135	58
Balls bowled	66	18305	7,745	1985
Wickets	4	309	238	94
Bowling average	13.00	34.31	26.41	25.07
5 wickets in innings	0	14	2	1
10 wickets in match	0	0	0	0
Best bowling	2/27	6/30	5/31	5/19
Catches/stumpings	0/–	27/–	15/–	16/–
- Source: , 5 July 2013

Neil Miller Carter (born 29 January 1975), is a South African-born cricketer who has played international cricket for Scotland. He previously played county cricket for Warwickshire. He went to Hottentots Holland High School and played for Boland before moving to Warwickshire. Carter completed 1,000 first class runs for Warwickshire during the match against Sussex at Edgbaston in 2005. He joined Middlesex on a loan deal in 2008, and played in the Stanford Super Series.

In 2010 he received the NatWest Professional Cricketers' Association Player of the Year Award. A pelvic injury hampered the early part of the 2011 season, but on his return to the first team, he took his best career figures of 6–30 vs Lancashire. Until mid season 2011, he had played in every 20/20 Warwickshire had played since the inception of the tournament.

He was awarded a benefit season by Warwickshire in 2012 as a reward for 10 years of service.

After the 2012 season, Carter agreed to join the Scotland cricket team. He qualified to play for Scotland due to gaining a British passport after residing in the United Kingdom while playing for Warwickshire.
