= Dougie Brown =

Scottish cricketer (born 1969)

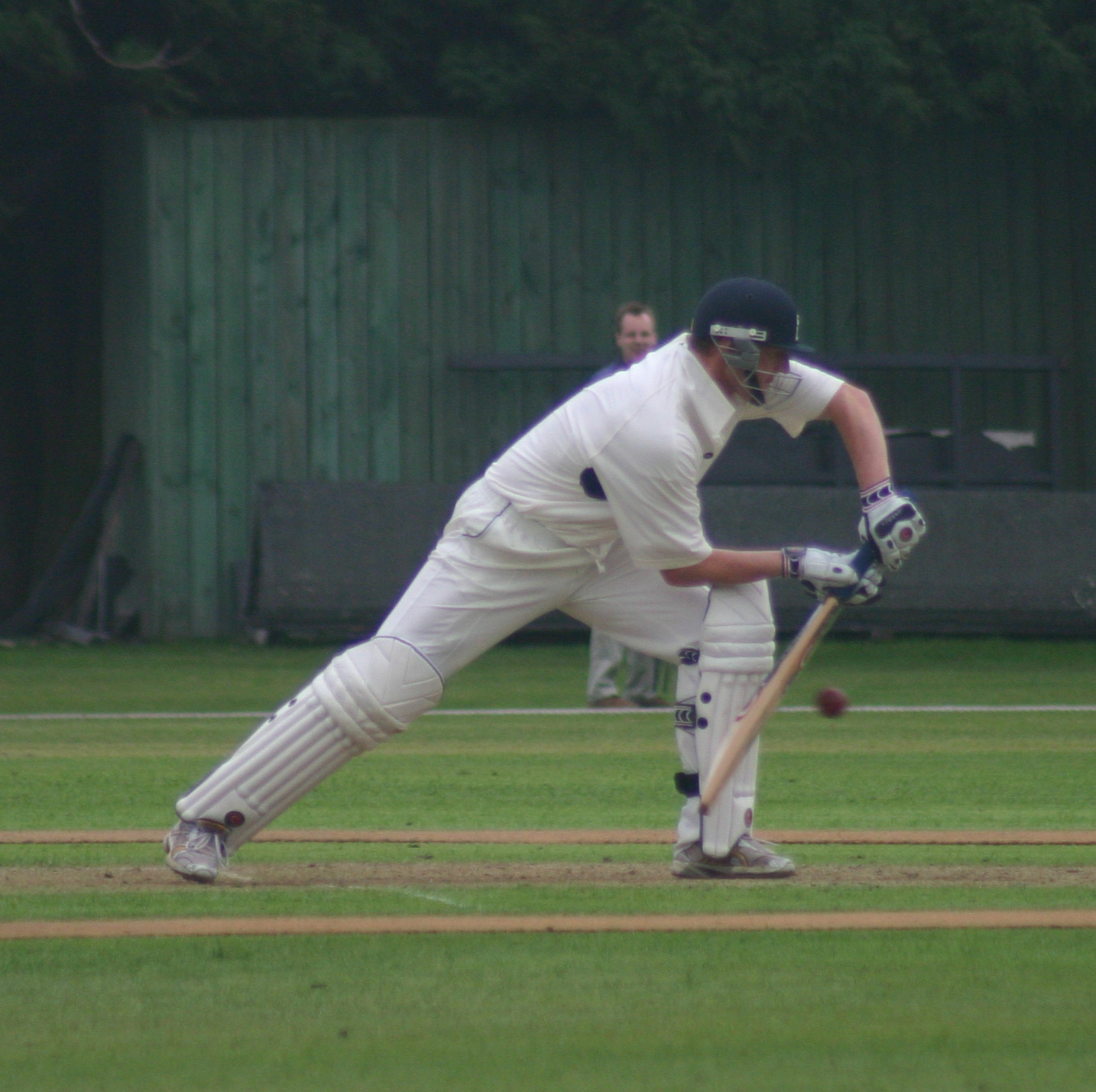
- Brown batting for Warwickshire in 2006

Personal information
- Full name: Douglas Robert Brown
- Born: 29 October 1969 (age 57); Stirling, Scotland
- Height: 6 ft 2 in (1.88 m)
- Batting: Right-handed
- Bowling: Right-arm fast-medium
- Role: All-rounder

International information
- National sides: England (1997–1998); Scotland (1989–1990, 2004–2007)
- ODI debut (cap 147/22): 11 December 1997; England v India
- Last ODI: 22 March 2007; Scotland v Netherlands
- T20I debut (cap 2): 12 September 2007; Scotland v Pakistan
- Last T20I: 13 September 2007; Scotland v India

Domestic team information
- Years: Team
- 1992–2007: Warwickshire
- 1995/96: Wellington
- 2003: Namibia

Career statistics
Competition	ODI	T20I	FC	LA
Matches	25	2	209	314
Runs scored	319	1	8,511	4,883
Batting average	17.72	1.00	30.61	22.81
100s/50s	0/1	0/0	10/44	1/23
Top score	50*	1	203	108
Balls bowled	953	24	30,855	12,942
Wickets	22	0	567	370
Bowling average	41.77	–	28.53	26.97
5 wickets in innings	0	–	21	2
10 wickets in match	0	–	4	0
Best bowling	3/37	–	8/89	5/31
Catches/stumpings	4/–	0/–	130/–	76/–
- Source: CricketArchive, 14 April 2016
- Brown's voice recorded February 2015

Douglas Robert Brown (born 29 October 1969) is a Scottish former cricketer and former head coach of the United Arab Emirates national team. Brown represented the Scottish national team as an all-rounder at One Day International (ODI) and Twenty20 International level, having earlier played One Day International cricket for England in 1997 and 1998. He played English county cricket for Warwickshire.

== Playing career ==
As a youngster Brown attended Alloa Academy, became a supporter of Alloa Athletic Football Club, represented Clackmannan County Cricket Club and played football at under-18 level for Scotland, and played for Feltham Rugby Football club as a competent fullback, choosing to focus on cricket shortly afterwards.

He first came to the attention of Warwickshire County Cricket Club in 1992 whilst playing for Scotland, he signed for the county and made his debut in the same year. He went on to spend his entire career with the county, for whom he has scored over 12500 runs and taken over 850 wickets at first-class and list A cricket. At this point he also played for the north Birmingham club Aston Unity CC.

Highlights of Brown's Warwickshire career included his contributions to their successes of the mid-1990s. In 1995 he helped Warwickshire to win the NatWest Trophy, and also scored 506 runs, and took 37 wickets at 27.32, as the county won the County Championship. In 1997 he scored 374 runs and took 17 wickets as Warwickshire won the AXA Life League, and in the same year took his career best first-class bowling figures, 8 for 89 when playing for a First Class Counties XI against Pakistan 'A'.

In 1997 Brown was named in England's one-day squad for four nations Champions Trophy at Sharjah. He made his debut on 11 December in England's narrow 7-run victory over their hosts, in this game Brown took no wickets and scored 6 runs. However, it was England's next game, on 13 December against the West Indies, that Brown gave his greatest performance as an England player.

He dismissed Philo Wallace with the opening ball of the game before going on to dismiss his Warwickshire teammate Brian Lara, then at the height of his powers, leg before wicket two balls later. This opening allowed England to take an easy victory. This game aside, Brown failed to excel at one-day cricket, and the 1998 tour of the West Indies was to prove his last.

He played for Scotland in the 2005 ICC Trophy, taking 11 wickets in the tournament, and scoring 59 runs in the final, to help Scotland win the competition. As a result, Scotland gained temporary One-day International status, and Brown has since played ODI cricket for Scotland in the 2006 European Cricket Championships, 2007 World Cricket League and 2007 Cricket World Cup.

In a twenty20 fixture between Warwickshire and Northamptonshire Steelbacks in July 2007, Brown suffered a severe Achilles tendon injury which ultimately ended his career.

== Coaching career ==
During the 2003 Cricket World Cup, Brown coached the Namibian team. He also coached them in South African domestic one-day cricket in the 2002/03 season, playing one game as an overseas player. Outside of cricket Brown works as a PE teacher.

At the end of the 2007 season, Brown retired from cricket to take up a coaching role at Warwickshire County Cricket Club. He was sacked despite having had success with the team by winning won two trophies, the T20 Blast in 2014 and 2016 Royal London One-Day Cup.

In January 2017, Brown was appointed head coach of the United Arab Emirates national team, succeeding interim coach Owais Shah. Brown moved on from UAE Cricket in 2020 and is now actively involved with the PSL (Pakistan Super League) and RedBear Consulting in the UAE.

== See also ==
- List of cricketers who have played for more than one international team
