= Mike Powell (English cricketer) =

English cricketer and coach

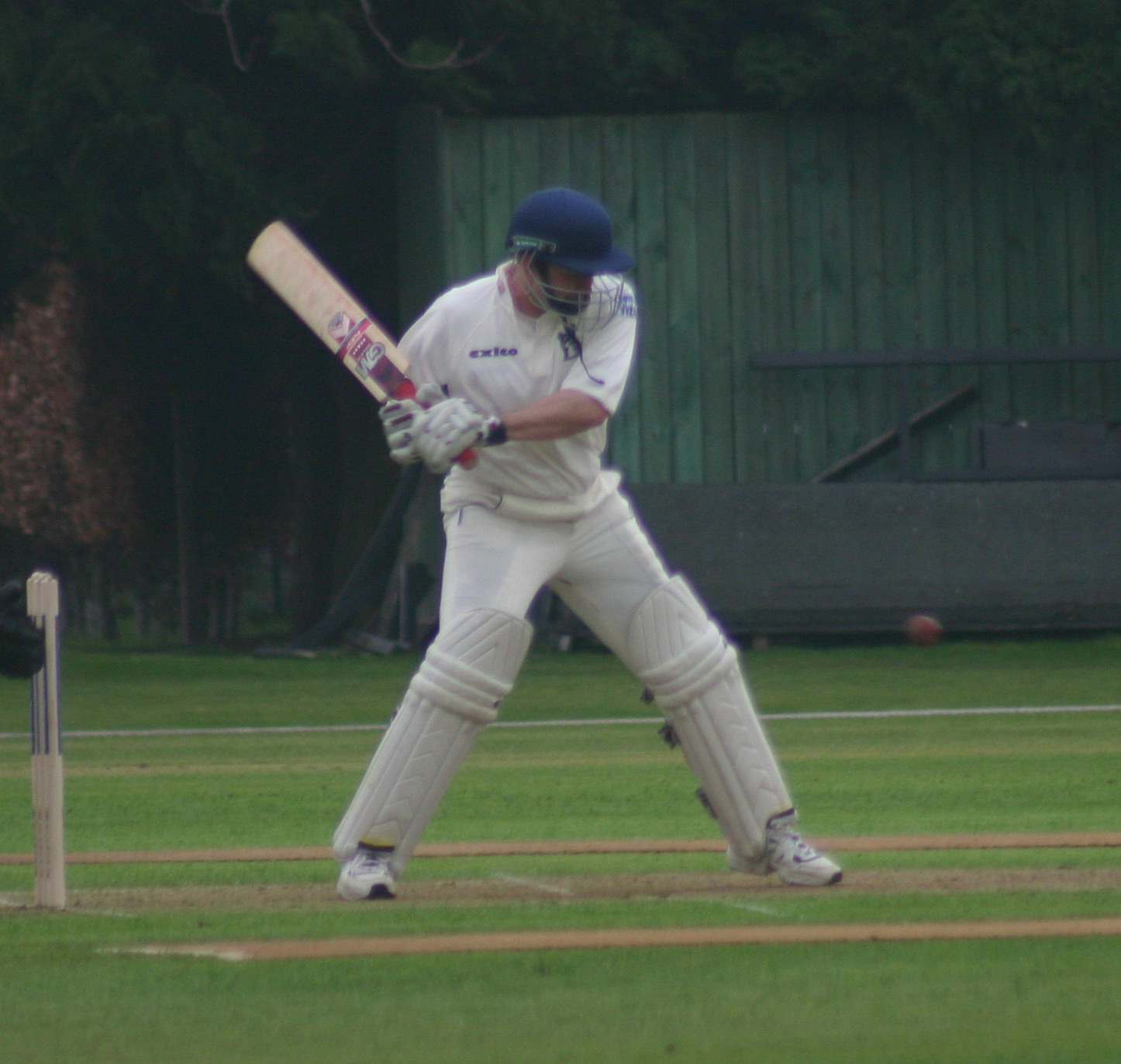
Powell playing against Cambridge UCCE, April 2006

Michael James Powell (born 5 April 1975) is an English cricketer and coach who played for and captained Warwickshire County Cricket Club. He also played in South Africa for Griqualand West during the 2001–02 season, and in New Zealand for Otago in 2005–06.

Powell was born at Bolton in 1975 and educated at Lawrence Sheriff School in Rugby. He captained Warwickshire from 2001 to 2003. In the 2001 season, the team were promoted from Division Two to Division One of the County Championship, and in the 2002 season they finished as runners-up in Division One, as well as winning the Benson & Hedges Cup Final at Lord's.

Powell was awarded a Benefit Year in 2008 but did not have his contract renewed at the end of that season following an appraisal of the playing staff under new coach Ashley Giles He has since coached cricket at Rugby School and in February 2010 it was announced that Powell would be working with Cricket Scotland as their new High Performance batting coach with a specific remit of developing and improving young Scottish cricketers.
