= Tony Frost =

English cricketer

Personal information
- Full name: Tony Frost
- Born: 17 November 1975 (age 50); Stoke-on-Trent, Staffordshire, England
- Height: 5 ft 10 in (1.78 m)
- Batting: Right-handed
- Role: Wicket-keeper

Domestic team information
- Years: Team
- 1997–2009: Warwickshire (squad no. 6)

Career statistics
Competition	FC	LA	T20
Matches	120	88	27
Runs scored	4,779	652	289
Batting average	32.51	20.37	20.64
100s/50s	6/22	0/2	0/1
Top score	242*	56	53
Balls bowled	55	–	–
Wickets	1	–	–
Bowling average	30.00	–	–
5 wickets in innings	0	–	–
10 wickets in match	0	–	–
Best bowling	1/12	–	–
Catches/stumpings	259/18	79/19	15/11
- Source: CricInfo, 23 June 2012

Tony Frost (born 17 November 1975) is an English former professional cricketer. He played as a right-handed batsman and wicket-keeper. Born in Stoke-on-Trent, Frost played for Warwickshire County Cricket Club, scoring over 4,500 runs in first-class cricket in a career which lasted from 1997 to 2009.

He played through most of season 2005, after Keith Piper's ban left Warwickshire without a regular wicket-keeper. After Tim Ambrose joined Warwickshire in 2006 Frost played very little County Championship cricket, although he played more often in one-day competitions. Frost retired as a professional at the end of the 2006 season.

Following Ambrose's call-up to play for England, Frost re-signed for Warwickshire for the 2008 season as cover. He ended the season having scored 1003 runs in 13 Championship games, averaging 83.58 runs per innings and scoring a career best of 242 not out. He came top of the county batting averages for the season and was awarded a Benefit Year for 2009.
