= Nick Knight (cricketer) =

English cricketer (born 1969)

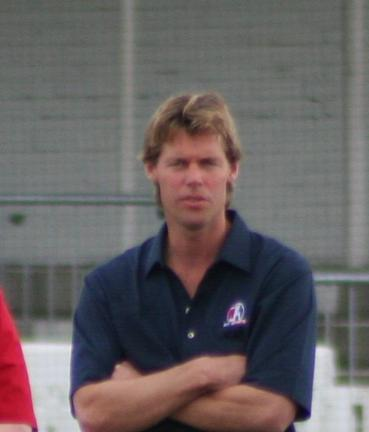

Personal information
- Full name: Nicholas Verity Knight
- Born: 28 November 1969 (age 56); Watford, Hertfordshire, England
- Height: 6 ft 1 in (185 cm)
- Batting: Left-handed
- Bowling: Right-arm medium
- Role: Batsman

International information
- National side: England (1995–2003)
- Test debut (cap 574): 27 July 1995 v West Indies
- Last Test: 31 May 2001 v Pakistan
- ODI debut (cap 140): 29 August 1996 v Pakistan
- Last ODI: 2 March 2003 v Australia
- ODI shirt no.: 1

Career statistics
| Competition | Test | ODI | FC | LA |
|---|---|---|---|---|
| Matches | 17 | 100 | 240 | 414 |
| Runs scored | 719 | 3,637 | 16,172 | 13,478 |
| Batting average | 23.96 | 40.41 | 44.18 | 38.61 |
| 100s/50s | 1/4 | 5/25 | 40/77 | 30/68 |
| Top score | 113 | 125* | 303* | 151 |
| Balls bowled | – | – | 249 | 90 |
| Wickets | – | – | 1 | 2 |
| Bowling average | – | – | 271.00 | 44.50 |
| 5 wickets in innings | – | – | 0 | 0 |
| 10 wickets in match | – | – | 0 | 0 |
| Best bowling | – | – | 1/61 | 1/14 |
| Catches/stumpings | 26/– | 44/– | 292/– | 174/– |
- Source: ESPNcricinfo, 18 July 2015

Nicholas Verity Knight (born 28 November 1969) is an English cricket commentator and former England cricketer. A left-handed opening batsman and a fine fielder, Knight played in 17 Test Matches and 100 One Day Internationals before announcing his retirement from international cricket after the 2003 World Cup.

== Early life and domestic career ==
Born in Watford, Hertfordshire, Knight was given his middle name in honour of the 1930s English Test bowler Hedley Verity who was killed in World War II and is a distant family relation. He was educated at Felsted School in Essex and Loughborough University and was an outstanding cricketer from an early age. He won the Daily Telegraph 'Young Cricketer of the Year' award in 1989 and played cricket for Brentwood cricket club from 1989 to 1991. In domestic cricket, he began his career with Essex in 1991 before transferring to Warwickshire four years later. He was captain of Warwickshire from 2003 to 2005, and led them to victory in the County Championship in the 2004 season. He retired from first-class cricket after the 2006 season and became a member of the Sky Sports cricket commentary team. He finished his first-class career with 16,172 runs at 44.18 and 40 hundreds. His highest score was an unbeaten 303 against Middlesex at Lord's in 2004.

== International career ==
=== Test Cricket ===
Knight struggled in the Test arena and made only one Test century, an innings of 113 against Pakistan at Headingley in 1996. The most obvious reason for his struggles was his technique. Never afraid of genuine fast bowling, his footwork was often not decisive enough which caused him at times to appear to be backing away from short balls and his test innings frequently ended giving a catch to the slips or the wicket-keeper. As a fine fielder and a hard worker, it is surprising that he did not play more for England – the England team was not blessed with too many good batsman during Knight's era. However two of the better batsmen were Michael Atherton and Mark Butcher with whom Knight was vying for a place for most of his career. Atherton too was captain of England until 1998 so would have been an automatic choice for opening batsman.

==== Zimbabwe Drawn Test 1996/97 ====
His next best score was 96 against Zimbabwe at Bulawayo in 1996–97, which was the first ever Test match that was a draw with the scores level. Having scored 56 in the first innings, he was at the crease for the entire second innings. Knight and Alec Stewart anchored the chase of 205 runs from the remaining 37 overs in the days play. This was a required run-rate of 5.54 runs per over, high not only for Test cricket in general, but also for a last innings chase and even more unlikely with Zimbabwe bowling extremely wide deliveries that the umpires only rarely punished with a wide call. Stewart was dismissed for 73 leaving the score at 2/154, then Nasser Hussain was out for 0, John Crawley for 7 and Graham Thorpe for 2 with the English score 5/182. Tail ender Darren Gough, who scored 2 from 7 balls, and Knight remained together as they looked to score the last 23 runs. Needing 11 off the final over, Knight hit a 6 early into the over by flaying a legside delivery from Streak over midwicket in a shot reminiscent of limited overs cricket. He followed with a 2, assisted by Gough sprinting back to the non-strikers end to make his ground. On strike for the last ball needing 3 to win, or a 6 to win and reach his second Test century, Knight charged down the pitch, hit through to deep cover hard enough that he thought it would go for a boundary, only for the grass outfield to hold the ball up as a fielder came around and returned the ball back to Andy Flower. The English batsmen scrambled two runs, turned for a third as Flower backtracked but still caught the incoming return and whipped the bails off to complete a run-out of Knight as the batters hadn't crossed yet. Knight was awarded man of the match for his efforts. A scores level draw had never happened in Test matches until this game, and before a second occurrence in 2011 between India and the West Indies, it was more rare than a Tied Test.

=== One Day Internationals ===
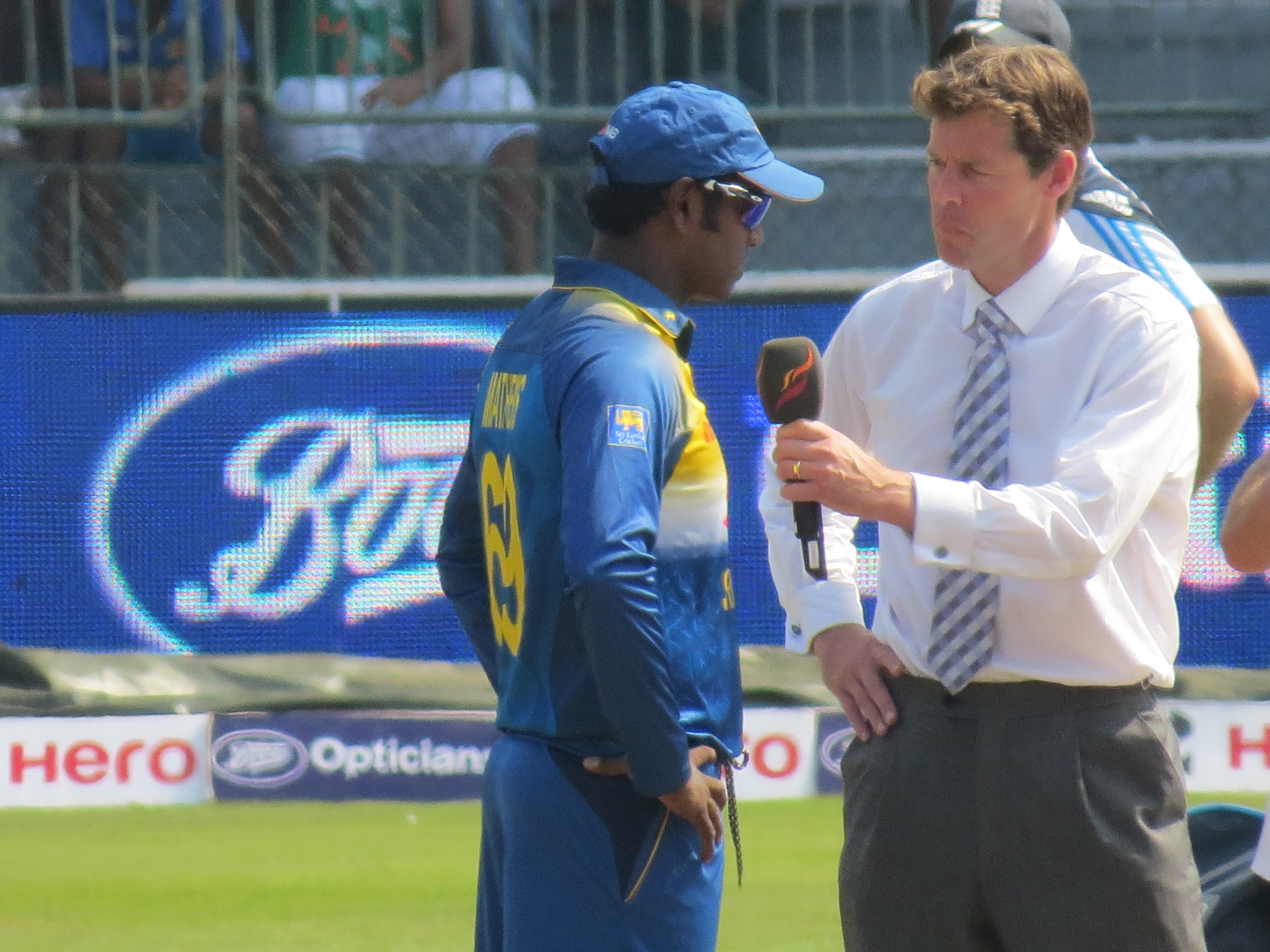
Nick Knight commentary at the toss with Sri Lanka captain Angelo Mathews during England tour in Sri Lanka 2015

Debuting in 1996, he scored centuries in his second and third innings in ODI cricket, on consecutive days against a Pakistan bowling attack that included Wasim Akram and Waqar Younis. Nick Knight set a world record for the highest ever ODI innings by a batsman when carrying his bat through his innings (125*) when he achieved it v Pakistan in 1996 He was also the first Englishman to carry his bat in an ODI innings.

Knight wasn't selected for the World Cup team in 1999 and made his World Cup debut in the 2003 tournament. He performed well in an unsuccessful campaign for England and faced the first delivery in cricket officially to break the 100 mph barrier, bowled by Shoaib Akhtar. He "pushed it nonchalantly to square leg."

== Post-retirement ==
Following his retirement from cricket, Knight became a commentator and pundit on Sky Sports.
