= Glamorgan County Cricket Club in 1921 =

Glamorgan County Cricket Club
1921 season
- Captain: (Wales) NVH Riches
- Ground(s): Cardiff Arms Park, Cardiff; St. Helen's Ground, Swansea
- County Championship: 17th
- Most runs: NVH Riches (1,080)
- Most wickets: A Nash (91)
- Most catches: FB Pinch (11)

The 1921 season marked Glamorgan County Cricket Club's 34th year of existence and its first as a first-class cricket county. The club joined the County Championship for the first time and finished bottom of the 17-team division with two wins and one winning draw out of 18 matches played. As well as participating in the County Championship, they also provided the opposition for the touring Australian side in a three-day match that finished in a draw.

== County Championship ==
18–20 May 1921
Scorecard

Glamorgan	v	Sussex
272 (113.5 overs); HG Symonds 58; GR Cox 3/36 (20.5 overs)		152 (66.5 overs); GA Stannard 41; A Nash 4/45 (29 overs)
213 (73.2 overs); JR Tait 96; GR Cox 5/60 (23 overs)		310 (78.2 overs); EH Bowley 146; H Creber 4/78 (19.2 overs)

Glamorgan won by 23 runs
Cardiff Arms Park, Cardiff
Umpires: T Flowers and AE Street

- Glamorgan won the toss and elected to bat.
- JR Tait, GE Cording, A O'Bree, E Cooper and A Nash (all Glam) made their first-class debuts.
- Points: Glamorgan 5, Sussex 0.

28–31 May 1921
Scorecard

Leicestershire	v	Glamorgan
335 (110.3 overs); WE Astill 115; WE Bates 3/40 (15.3 overs)		192 (56 overs); WE Bates 59; JH King 4/65 (21 overs)
70 (35 overs); GBF Rudd 24; A Nash 6/37 (17 overs)		193 (86 overs); NVH Riches 57; JH King 5/86 (37 overs)

Leicestershire won by 20 runs
St Helen's, Swansea
Umpires: T Flowers and HI Young

- Leicestershire won the toss and elected to bat.
- JC Clay and WN Gemmill (both Glam) made their first-class debuts.

1–2 June 1921
Scorecard

Gloucestershire	v	Glamorgan
401 (134.4 overs); AE Dipper 146; H Creber 5/83 (34.4 overs)		66 (36.5 overs); A O'Bree 27; CWL Parker 7/19 (18.5 overs)
		144 (f/o; 51.4 overs); TAL Whittington 33; WR Gouldsworthy 6/59 (17.4 overs)

Gloucestershire won by an innings and 191 runs
St Helen's, Swansea
Umpires: FW Marlow and HI Young

- Gloucestershire won the toss and elected to bat.
- ECJ Sheppard (Glos) and WLT Jenkins (Glam) made their first-class debuts.

15–17 June
Scorecard

Somerset	v	Glamorgan
408 (126.1 overs); PR Johnson 123; JC Clay 4/50 (17.1 overs)		127 (67.1 overs); H Tomlinson 36; JC White 7/52 (31 overs)
		153 (f/o) (65.2 overs); NVH Riches 26; WN Gemmill 26; JC White 7/58 (28.2 overs)

Somerset won by an innings and 128 runs
St Helen's, Swansea
Umpires: GP Harrison and JP Whiteside

- Somerset won the toss and elected to bat.
- H Tomlinson and GE Martin (both Glam) made their first-class debuts.

18–20 June
Scorecard

Glamorgan	v	Derbyshire
168 (69.2 overs); WE Bates 67; W Bestwick 4/71 (30 overs)		83 (47.5 overs); SWA Cadman 25; WE Bates 4/17 (6.5 overs)
106 (37 overs); WE Bates 48; W Bestwick 10/40 (19 overs)		193/8 (54.2 overs); W Carter 50; A Nash 5/56 (25 overs)

Derbyshire won by 2 wickets
Cardiff Arms Park, Cardiff
Umpires: GP Harrison and JP Whiteside

- Glamorgan won the toss and elected to bat.

22–23 June
Scorecard

Glamorgan	v	Lancashire
97 (47.2 overs); HG Symonds 26; JD Tyldesley 5/64 (20 overs)		115 (52.1 overs); MN Kenyon 22; WS Hacker 6/49 (24.1 overs)
123 (55.4 overs); H Tomlinson 35; LW Cook 4/31 (23.4 overs)		106/6 (26.4 overs); JR Barnes 28; WS Hacker 3/42 (12 overs)

Lancashire won by 4 wickets
Cardiff Arms Park, Cardiff
Umpires: GP Harrison and AE Street

- Glamorgan won the toss and elected to bat.

29–30 June
Scorecard

Northamptonshire	v	Glamorgan
246 (86.2 overs); RA Haywood 96; A Nash 6/73 (29 overs)		72 (37.1 overs); WLT Jenkins 19; WE Bates 19; CN Woolley 6/30 (18.1 overs)
		54 (f/o) (24.2 overs); NVH Riches 34; JV Murdin 6/32 (12.2 overs)

Northamptonshire won by an innings and 120 runs
Cardiff Arms Park, Cardiff
Umpires: F Harry and C Marshall

- Northamptonshire won the toss and elected to bat.
- TR Morgan and HW Baxter (both Glam) made their first-class debuts.

9–12 July
Scorecard

Worcestershire	v	Glamorgan
225 (62 overs); FA Pearson 63; A Nash 6/66 (25 overs)		220 (60.2 overs); W Spiller 40; WH Taylor 7/64 (15.2 overs)
272 (82.3 overs); FA Pearson 78; H Creber 5/60 (25.3 overs)		239 (74.3 overs); WE Bates 85; HA Gilbert 4/56 (23.3 overs)

Worcestershire won by 38 runs
Chester Road North Ground, Kidderminster
Umpires: B Brown and HR Butt

- Worcestershire won the toss and elected to bat.
- WG Gethin (Worcs), ER Sweet-Escott, W Spiller and VL Morris (all Glam) made their first-class debuts.

23–26 July
Scorecard

Northamptonshire	v	Glamorgan
232 (64.4 overs); W Wells 100; WS Hacker 7/84 (26.4 overs)		137 (55.4 overs); NVH Riches 33; W Wells 5/33 (14 overs)
364/9d (80 overs); RA Haywood 198; WS Hacker 3/99 (24 overs)		215 (72.2 overs); W Spiller 104; W Wells 3/40 (17 overs)

Northamptonshire won by 244 runs
County Ground, Northampton
Umpires: F Harry and FW Marlow

- Northamptonshire won the toss and elected to bat.
- T Arnott (Glam) made his first-class debut.

27–29 July
Scorecard

Glamorgan	v	Worcestershire
405/7d (130 overs); FB Pinch 138*; HA Gilbert 4/80 (37 overs)		63 (25.4 overs); FA Pearson 17; A Nash 7/34 (12.4 overs)
		289 (f/o) (95.3 overs); FA Pearson 167; A Nash 8/82 (32.3 overs)

Glamorgan won by an innings and 53 runs
St Helen's, Swansea
Umpires: H Bagshaw and C Marshall

- Glamorgan won the toss and elected to bat.
- AE Freethy, FB Pinch and DJ Reason (all Glam) made their first-class debuts.

3–5 August
Scorecard

Glamorgan	v	Somerset
191 (70.1 overs); WE Bates 52; JC White 5/57 (28.1 overs)		127 (57 overs); J Daniell 59; A Nash 5/39 (22 overs)
158/3d (70 overs); NVH Riches 79*; CA Winter 1/18 (4 overs)		11/0 (3 overs); JCW MacBryan 6*

Match drawn
Clarence Park, Weston-super-Mare
Umpires: J Blake and HI Young

- Glamorgan won the toss and elected to bat.
- TES Francis and CA Winter (both Somst) made their first-class debuts.

10–12 August
Scorecard

Sussex	v	Glamorgan
186 (64.2 overs); VWC Jupp 82; FB Pinch 4/58 (16 overs)		193 (50.4 overs); W Spiller 58; AE Relf 4/21 (7 overs)
399 (94.5 overs); VWC Jupp 128; JC Clay 4/121 (26 overs)		126 (51.2 overs); FB Pinch 30; GR Cox 4/8 (5.2 overs)

Sussex won by 266 runs
Central Recreation Ground, Hastings
Umpires: TA Brown and WAJ West

- Sussex won the toss and elected to bat.

13–16 August
Scorecard

Glamorgan	v	Hampshire
147 (47.4 overs); NVH Riches 70; AS Kennedy 6/46 (21 overs)		418/8d (123 overs); JA Newman 166*; JC Clay 4/101 (34 overs)
222 (57 overs); NVH Riches 81; JA Newman 6/54 (22 overs)

Hampshire won by an innings and 49 runs
County Ground, Southampton
Umpires: AJ Atfield and HR Butt

- Glamorgan won the toss and elected to bat.
- PE Lawrie (Hants) made his first-class debut.

17–18 August
Scorecard

Glamorgan	v	Hampshire
37 (25.3 overs); WE Bates 10; AS Kennedy 8/11 (13 overs)		183 (75.4 overs); G Brown 51; FB Pinch 3/25 (13 overs)
114 (54.3 overs); FB Pinch 47; AS Kennedy 4/41 (24 overs)

Hampshire won by an innings and 32 runs
Cardiff Arms Park, Cardiff
Umpires: H Bagshaw and JH Board

- Glamorgan won the toss and elected to bat.
- DB Williams (Glam) made his first-class debut.

20–22 August
Scorecard

Glamorgan	v	Derbyshire
81 (31.1 overs); JR Tait 22; SWA Cadman 4/33 (14 overs)		162 (48.2 overs); A Morton 65*; A Nash 5/58 (23 overs)
197 (96.2 overs); WN Gemmill 56; W Bestwick 5/79 (41.2 overs)		117/7 (39.3 overs); J Bowden 35*; JC Clay 5/37 (14.3 overs)

Derbyshire won by 3 wickets
Queen's Park, Chesterfield
Umpires: F Harry and W Reeves

- Glamorgan won the toss and elected to bat.
- JHP Brain (Glam) made his first-class debut.

24–26 August
Scorecard

Glamorgan	v	Gloucestershire
169 (58 overs); WE Bates 54; CWL Parker 5/68 (24 overs)		342 (119 overs); AE Dipper 84; WE Bates 4/48 (13 overs)
228 (85.5 overs); NVH Riches 80; EG Dennett 7/54 (23.5 overs)		56/3 (27.2 overs); CS Barnett 15*; H Smith 15*; A Nash 2/20 (13 overs)

Gloucestershire won by 7 wickets
Fry's Ground, Bristol
Umpires: A Millward and AE Street

- Glamorgan won the toss and elected to bat.

27–30 August
Scorecard

Glamorgan	v	Leicestershire
194 (77.5 overs); NVH Riches 70; WE Astill 5/54 (27 overs)		245 (97.1 overs); JH King 60; JC Clay 6/86 (29 overs)
347 (119.1 overs); NVH Riches 177*; WE Benskin 4/89 (34.1 overs)		297/5 (75 overs); A Mounteney 104*; JC Clay 3/110 (23 overs)

Leicestershire won by 5 wickets
Aylestone Road, Leicester
Umpires: B Brown and TA Brown

- Glamorgan won the toss and elected to bat.

31 August – 2 September
Scorecard

Glamorgan	v	Lancashire
127 (57.1 overs); JC Clay 29; RK Tyldesley 6/36 (21.1 overs)		46/2 (24 overs); GE Tyldesley 16*; A Nash 1/11 (10 overs)

Match drawn
Old Trafford, Manchester
Umpires: GP Harrison and W Reeves

- Glamorgan won the toss and elected to bat.

== Tour match ==
30 July – 2 August 1921
Scorecard

Glamorgan	v	Australians
213 (84.3 overs); WE Bates 79; WW Armstrong 5/61 (34 overs)		461/8 (114 overs); W Bardsley 122; H Creber 3/130 (34 overs)

Match drawn
St Helen's Ground, Swansea
Umpires: C Marshall and TM Russell

- Glamorgan won the toss and elected to bat.
- There was no play on day 3.
