= Frank Ryan (cricketer) =

English cricketer

Personal information
- Full name: Francis Peter Ryan
- Born: 14 November 1888; Tundla, North-Western Provinces, British India
- Died: 5 January 1954 (aged 65); Leicester, Leicestershire, England
- Batting: Left-handed
- Bowling: Slow left-arm orthodox

Domestic team information
- Years: Team
- 1919–1920: Hampshire
- 1922–1931: Glamorgan

Career statistics
Competition	First-class
Matches	247
Runs scored	1,908
Batting average	7.98
100s/50s	–/1
Top score	52*
Balls bowled	43,519
Wickets	1,013
Bowling average	21.04
5 wickets in innings	86
10 wickets in match	18
Best bowling	8/41
Catches/stumpings	105/–
- Source: Cricinfo, 26 March 2024

Francis 'Frank' Peter Ryan (14 November 1888 – 5 January 1954) was an English first-class cricketer. After serving in the First World War with the Royal Flying Corps, Ryan played as a professional for Hampshire from 1919 to 1920. A heavy-drinker who was known for having a short-temper, he fell out with Hampshire and walked out on the club, subsequently joining Glamorgan as their professional between 1923 and 1931. He made over 200 appearances for the Welsh county, taking over 900 wickets as a slow left-arm orthodox bowler. Following the end of his career, he would play club cricket in the Lancashire and South Wales League, as well as in Yorkshire.

== Early life and cricket ==
Ryan was born in British India at Tundla in November 1884. He was educated firstly in Darjeeling at St. Joseph's School, before attending Bedford School in England. After spending a brief period living in the United States, Ryan served in the First World War with the Royal Flying Corps. Following the end of the war, he made his debut in first-class cricket for Hampshire against Yorkshire at Dewsbury in the 1919 County Championship. He played for Hampshire for two seasons, making 23 appearances. In these, he took 63 wickets with his slow left-arm orthodox bowling, taking five wickets in an innings on five occasions and ten-wickets in a match once.

Ryan struggled to settle in his two seasons with Hampshire, facilitated by a short temper and heavy drinking. He was known to have had several disagreements with Hampshire's captain Lionel Tennyson. After a heavy nights drinking, another disagreement with Tennyson materialised, which resulted in Ryan walking away from Hampshire. Keen to maintain a career as a professional cricketer, he hitchhiked without any money to Bristol to meet with an associate whom he hoped would introduce him to the Gloucestershire secretary, who he hoped would present him with a contract. His associate was aware of Ryan's struggles with drink, instead recommending him to contact Jack Nash at Glamorgan, who were in the process of strengthening their bowling attack. After a two-day walk to Cardiff from Bristol, he was directed on foot to Swansea where Glamorgan were playing their next match; having made the journey in torrential rain, he arrived at the ground soaked. There he spoke with the county's officials and agreed to qualify to play for the county.

== Career with Glamorgan ==
During his qualification period, he played in the Lancashire League for one season. Ryan made his debut for Glamorgan in a friendly first-class match against a combined Oxford and Cambridge Universities team at Cardiff in 1922. He qualified to play for Glamorgan in the County Championship in 1923, and initially showed more self-discipline during his early years at Glamorgan, in stark contrast to the circumstances under which he left Hampshire. Ryan made his debut in the Championship against Surrey, playing for Glamorgan 24 times during his debut season. He also played for Wales against Scotland at Perth, making what would be his only first-class half century (52 not out) and sharing in a partnership of 90 for the tenth wicket with Dennis Sullivan. In his first season in South Wales, he forged what would become a successful bowling partnership with Johnnie Clay and Jack Mercer. Ryan's first season yielded him 106 wickets at an average of 22.53, with eight five wicket hauls.

Having established himself in the Glamorgan starting eleven, Ryan had what would be his most successful season as a bowler in 1924, taking 126 wickets from 24 matches at an average of 14.46, whilst claiming twelve five wicket hauls. His most notable performances during that season included match figures of 12 for 65 against Somerset, 11 for 64 against Leicestershire, and 10 for 109 against Lancashire. The following season, he surpassed his 1924 wickets tally (albeit at a less impressive average of 17.65) with 139 from 28 matches, which was the highest number of wickets taken by Glamorgan bowler in a season until it was surpassed four years later by Mercer. He took what would become his career-best bowling figures during that season, with 8 for 41 against Derbyshire. In 1925, Ryan made a first-class appearance for Wales against Ireland, and played for the South in the North v South fixture at Blackpool. In 1926, he passed 100 wickets in a season for the third time, with 112 wickets from 25 matches at an average of 19.31. He also played for H. D. G. Leveson Gower's personal eleven against Oxford University, taking five wickets in Oxford's second innings.

Following the 1926 season, Ryan once again resorted to heavy drinking, with his social exploits beginning to impact his performances, much to the annoyance of the Glamorgan hierarchy. During one match he became so drunk in the evening that he forgot which hotel the team were staying at and spent the night sleeping under the covers, while on another occasion following a match against Lancashire, he drank so heavily throughout the night that he had to make his own way back to Swansea by taxi, for which he provided a receipt to the county treasurer for reimbursement. He failed to take 100 wickets in 1927, finishing with only 76 wickets at an average of 20.09. However, Ryan played a leading-role in Glamorgan's innings victory over Nottinghamshire in their final match of the 1927 County Championship. With Nottinghamshire requiring just a draw to win the Championship, Ryan took 5 for 81 in their first innings and 4 for 14 in their second innings; Glamorgan's surprise victory handed the Championship to Lancashire. Glamorgan suffered a poor 1928 County Championship littered with defeats, with their captain Trevor Arnott struggling to control Ryan's attitude and short-temper, leading to him being dropped in late July and early August in an attempt to create a more harmonious team environment. Despite this, he still featured in 27 matches that season (including three for Wales), taking 96 wickets at an average of 27.27.

With Clay and Maurice Turnbull replacing Arnott as captain, his attitude improved, and he returned to form with the ball in the coming seasons. In twenty matches in 1929, Ryan took 68 wickets at an average of 26.39, but had greater success the following season. Playing the same number of first-class matches as in the previous season, he took 134 wickets at an average of 20.50, taking thirteen five wicket hauls. Playing against the touring Australians in 1930, he notably dismissed Don Bradman, one of his six wickets in the Australians first innings. He played a final season for Glamorgan in 1931, taking 88 wickets at an average of 24.35. His drinking and resultant struggle with finances was well known to Turnbull, who would intercept Ryan from the train when the team returned to Cardiff Central from away matches and give him some money as a "bonus" for fine bowling performances, not only to motivate him, but to also create an illusion to Ryan's wife that he was not drinking away his match fees. With Glamorgan in financial trouble at the beginning of the 1930s, the Glamorgan committee saw fit to cut costs, with one solution being to release a number of their professional players, with Ryan being amongst them.

Ryan was described by The Times as "tall, with a high easy action" who "combined appreciable break with accuracy and on his day bore comparison with the best bowlers of his type". In 215 matches for Glamorgan, he took 913 wickets at an average of 20.86; he took five wickets in an innings on 79 occasions and ten wickets in a match on seventeen. Had Ryan not been released, it is likely he would have become the first Glamorgan player to take 1,000 first-class wickets; as of 2026, he has taken the sixth-highest number of wickets for Glamorgan in first-class cricket. Having played seven times for Wales, he took 27 wickets at an average of 15.44, with one five wicket haul. As a lower order batsman, his batting was described as "enigmatic", with it being noted by Brian Halford and Andrew Hignell that he was capable of "executing some elegant and graceful strokes", but that he rarely batted with confidence or seriousness. This was reflected by his career tally of 1,908 runs at a batting average of 7.98. Had it not been for his drinking and disciplinary issues, some of his contemporaries believed he would have come close to playing Test cricket for England.

== Later life and death ==
Ryan remained in Cardiff with his wife until the spring of 1932, in the hope that Glamorgan might reconsider his release and re-engage him. This eventuality never materialised, with Ryan assisting Heath in the South Wales League during the 1932 season, before signing for Barnsley ahead of the 1933 season. From there, he signed for Enfield in the Lancashire League ahead of the 1935 season. He later served in the Second World War with the Intelligence Corps. Ryan died at his Leicester residence in January 1954. He was survived by his widow and their three children.

== Bibliography ==
- Halford, Brian; Hignell, Andrew (2018). The Daffodil Blooms. Cardiff: ACS. pp. 25–26. ISBN 9781908165916.
