= Creber =

Creber is a surname. Notable people with the name include:

- Arthur Creber (1909–1966), Welsh cricketer
- Harry Creber (1872–1939), English cricketer
- Lewis Creber (1901–1966), British art director
- Michelle Creber (born 1999), Canadian actress and singer
- William J. Creber (1931–2019), American art director and production designer

== See also ==
- Aspergillus creber, species of fungus in the genus Aspergillus
