= 1908 English cricket season =

1908 was the nineteenth season of County Championship cricket in England.

American John Barton "Bart" King topped the bowling averages as a member of the touring Philadelphian cricket team.

== Honours ==
- County Championship – Yorkshire
- Minor Counties Championship – Staffordshire
- Wisden (Lord Hawke and Four Cricketers of the Year) – Walter Brearley, Lord Hawke, Jack Hobbs, Alan Marshal, John Newstead

== County Championship ==
	County	Played	Won	Lost	Drawn	Abandoned	Points	Finished Games	%
1	Yorkshire	28	16	0	12	0	16	16	100.00
2	Kent	25	17	3	5	1	14	20	70.00
3	Surrey	29	13	4	12	1	9	17	52.94
4	Middlesex	19	6	3	10	1	3	9	33.33
5	Sussex	28	6	4	18	0	2	10	20.00
6	Worcestershire	18	6	5	7	0	1	11	9.09
7	Lancashire	25	10	9	6	1	1	19	5.26
8	Nottinghamshire	20	6	7	7	0	-1	13	-7.69
9	Hampshire	22	7	9	6	0	-2	16	-12.50
10	Gloucestershire	24	8	11	5	0	-3	19	-15.78
11	Essex	22	5	7	10	0	-2	12	-16.67
12	Warwickshire	21	5	9	7	1	-4	14	-28.57
13	Leicestershire	21	4	8	9	1	-4	12	-33.33
14	Derbyshire	22	5	13	4	0	-8	18	-44.44
15	Northamptonshire	22	3	14	5	0	-11	17	-64.71
16	Somerset	20	2	13	5	0	-11	15	-73.33
Details as recorded in John Wisden’s Cricketers’ Almanack

Points system:

- 1 for a win
- 0 for a draw, a tie or an abandoned match
- -1 for a loss

== Minor Counties Championship ==
Worcestershire Second Eleven dropped out and Carmarthenshire took their place. Dorset moved from the West division in 1907 to the South.

=== North ===
	County	Played	Won	Won on 1st inns	No result	Possible points	Points obtained	%
1	Staffordshire	10	5	4	0	50	37	74.00
2	Durham	10	6	0	0	50	30	60.00
3	Yorkshire Second Eleven	10	2	3	0	50	19	38.00
4	Lincolnshire	10	3	1	0	50	18	36.00
6	Northumberland	10	3	1	0	50	18	36.00
6	Lancashire Second Eleven	10	2	0	0	50	10	20.00

=== South ===
	County	Played	Won	Won on 1st inns	No result	Possible points	Points obtained	%
1	Wiltshire	8	6	1	0	40	33	82.50
2	Surrey Second Eleven	8	6	0	0	40	30	75.00
3	Dorset	8	2	1	0	40	13	32.50
4	Buckinghamshire	8	2	0	0	40	10	25.00
5	Berkshire	8	1	1	0	40	8	20.00

=== East ===
	County	Played	Won	Won on 1st inns	No result	Possible points	Points obtained	%
1	Hertfordshire	8	3	3	0	40	24	60.00
2	Bedfordshire	8	4	1	0	40	23	57.50
2	Suffolk	8	4	1	0	40	23	57.50
4	Norfolk	8	2	1	0	40	13	32.50
5	Cambridgeshire	8	0	1	0	40	3	7.50

=== West ===
	County	Played	Won	Won on 1st inns	No result	Possible points	Points obtained	%
1	Glamorgan	8	6	0	0	40	30	90.00
1	Monmouthshire	8	6	0	0	40	30	90.00
1	Devon	8	6	0	0	40	20	50.00
4	Cornwall	8	1	1	0	40	8	27.50
5	Carmarthenshire	8	0	0	0	40	0	0.00

Points system:

- 5 for an outright win
- 3 for a win on the first innings
- 0 for a loss either outright or on the first innings of a drawn match

Matches with no first innings result are ignored when calculating maximum possible points.

==== Glamorgan v. Monmouthshire (play-off) ====
Glamorgan and Monmouthshire met in a play-off to decide who should meet Wiltshire. The two were chosen over Devon because Monmouthshire had a better average runs, and Glamorgan had played in the 1907 semi-finals.

26 August 1908

Glamorgan	v	Monmouthshire
136; Bancroft 43; G. Phillips 4/27		did not bat

No result
Cardiff Arms Park

- Glamorgan won toss and decided to bat
- Rain washed out all cricket on the second day, Thursday 27 August

Mr. F.E. Lacey awarded the right to meet Wiltshire to Glamorgan after the washout of the second day.

=== Semi-Finals ===
==== Staffordshire v. Hertfordshire ====
24 August 1908

Staffordshire	v	Hertfordshire
231; Winser 53		41 Bucknell 6/14, Barnes 4/14
82 White 5/17		43 Barnes 5/11, Bucknell 5/43

Staffordshire won by 229 runs
County Ground, Stoke-on-Trent

- Staffordshire won toss and decided to bat

==== Wiltshire v. Glamorgan ====
3 September 1908

Wiltshire	v	Glamorgan
41 Creber 8/18		172; Whittington 36, Riches 35
51/2

Glamorgan won on first innings
Hardenhuish Park Cricket Ground

- There was no play on either Thursday 3 September or Friday 4 September due to persistent rain

=== Final ===
7 September 1908

Staffordshire	v	Glamorgan
134 Nash 4/47, Creber 4/62		60; Riches 23; Barnes 7/19
9/1		79 Barnes 8/35

Staffordshire won by nine wickets
County Ground, Stoke-on-Trent

- Glamorgan won the toss and decided to bat

== Leading batsmen (qualification 20 innings) ==
1908 English season leading batsmen
Name	Team	Matches	Innings	Not outs	Runs	Highest score	Average	100s
Bernard Bosanquet	Middlesex	14	22	2	1081	214	54.05	3
C.B. Fry	Sussex	13	20	1	1000	214	52.63	3
Henry Foster	Worcestershire	14	21	1	1105	215	48.04	2
Tom Hayward	Surrey	37	52	1	2337	175	45.82	5
Plum Warner	Middlesex MCC	29	45	5	1822	120	45.55	5
Ranjitsinhji	Sussex MCC	18	28	3	1138	200	45.52	3
Johnny Tyldesley	Lancashire	26	45	2	1891	243	43.97	6
Gilbert Jessop	Gloucestershire	26	48	3	1885	164	41.88	4
Frank Tarrant	Middlesex MCC	33	49	7	1724	157	41.04	5
Alan Marshal	Surrey	33	50	2	1931	176	40.22	5

== Leading bowlers (qualification 1,000 balls) ==
1908 English season leading bowlers
Name	Team	Matches	Balls bowled	Runs conceded	Wickets taken	Average	Best bowling	5 wickets in innings	10 wickets in match
Bart King	Philadelphians	10	2028	958	87	11.01	7/28	10	3
Schofield Haigh	Yorkshire	26	3740	1380	103	13.39	7/23	8	2
George Hirst	Yorkshire	35	6731	2445	174	14.05	7/51	15	3
Ernest Kirk	Surrey	5	1236	470	30	15.66	6/41	3	0
Razor Smith	Surrey	15	2244	895	57	15.70	6/27	5	2
Wilfred Rhodes	Yorkshire	36	4827	1855	115	16.13	6/17	6	0
Walter Brearley	Lancashire	20	5138	2636	163	16.17	8/61	21	7
John Newstead	Yorkshire	36	6273	2311	140	16.50	7/18	9	3
Frank Tarrant	Middlesex; MCC	33	6744	2819	169	16.68	8/120	20	5
Colin Blythe	Kent	28	8200	3326	197	16.88	8/83	20	6

== Annual reviews ==
- John Wisden's Cricketers' Almanack, 1909
