= 1913 English cricket season =

1913 was the twenty-fourth season of County Championship cricket in England. Kent won the title for the fourth time in eight seasons.

== Honours ==
- County Championship – Kent
- Minor Counties Championship – Norfolk
- Wisden – Major Booth, George Gunn, Bill Hitch, Albert Relf, Lionel Tennyson

== County Championship ==
	County	Played	Won	Lost	First Innings			Points		%
	County	Played	Won	Lost	Won	Lost	No result	Poss	Obtd	%
1	Kent	28	20	3	3	1	1	135	110	81.48
2	Yorkshire	28	16	4	4	3	1	135	95	70.37
3	Surrey	26	13	5	4	4	0	130	81	62.30
4	Northamptonshire	22	12	4	1	5	0	110	68	61.81
5	Nottinghamshire	20	8	5	3	4	0	100	53	53.00
6	Middlesex	20	7	6	4	3	0	100	50	50.00
7	Sussex	28	10	10	4	3	1	135	65	48.14
8	Lancashire	26	7	11	7	0	1	125	56	44.80
9	Gloucestershire	22	8	11	1	2	0	110	45	40.90
10	Hampshire	26	7	11	4	4	0	130	51	39.23
11	Warwickshire	24	7	11	3	3	0	120	47	39.16
12	Worcestershire	20	6	9	1	3	1	95	36	37.89
13	Derbyshire	18	4	10	2	2	0	90	28	31.11
14	Leicestershire	22	4	13	1	4	0	110	27	24.54
15	Essex	18	2	9	2	4	1	85	20	23.52
16	Somerset	16	2	11	2	1	0	80	17	21.25
Details as recorded in John Wisden's Cricketers' Almanack

- Five points were awarded for a win.
- Three points were awarded for "winning" the first innings of a drawn match.
- One point was awarded for "losing" the first innings of a drawn match.
- Matches in which no result was achieved on the first innings were not included in calculating maximum possible points.
- Final placings were decided by calculating the percentage of possible points.

== Minor Counties Championship ==
1913 Minor Counties Championship table
	County	Played	Won	First innings			Points		%
	County	Played	Won	Won	Lost	No result	Poss	Obtd	%
1	Norfolk	8	4	3	0	0	40	29	72.50
1	Glamorgan	8	5	1	1	0	40	29	72.50
3	Hertfordshire	8	4	2	2	0	40	28	70.00
4	Staffordshire	10	6	0	1	1	45	31	68.88
5	Durham	10	5	1	1	1	45	29	64.44
6	Northumberland	10	5	1	0	1	45	28	62.22
7	Lincolnshire	10	4	3	1	0	50	30	60.00
8	Bedfordshire	8	4	0	2	0	40	22	55.00
9	Surrey Second Eleven	8	3	2	0	0	40	21	52.50
10	Berkshire	8	4	0	0	0	40	20	50.00
10	Dorset	8	4	0	0	0	40	20	50.00
12	Monmouthshire	8	3	1	1	0	40	19	47.50
13	Devon	8	3	1	0	0	40	18	45.00
14	Cornwall	8	3	0	1	0	40	16	40.00
15	Cheshire	8	2	0	0	1	35	10	28.57
16	Buckinghamshire	8	2	0	1	0	40	11	27.50
16	Cambridgeshire	8	2	0	1	0	40	11	27.50
16	Wiltshire	8	2	0	1	0	40	11	27.50
19	Kent Second Eleven	8	1	1	2	0	40	10	25.00
20	Suffolk	8	0	0	1	0	40	1	2.50

- Five points were awarded for a win.
- Three points were awarded for "winning" the first innings of a drawn match.
- One point was awarded for "losing" the first innings of a drawn match.
- Matches in which no result was achieved on the first innings were not included in calculating maximum possible points.
- Final placings were decided by calculating the percentage of possible points.

=== Final ===
Because Norfolk and Glamorgan were tied on percentage and had not played each other, the rules required that they play a challenge match. Glamorgan accepted this on condition that a guarantee of £50 be given.

1 September 1913

Norfolk	v	Glamorgan
244; R. F. Popham 74; Hacker 4/79, Creber 4/79		168 Fulcher 5/26, Falconer 5/49
61 Creber 8/33

Norfolk won on first innings
County Ground, Lakenham

- Norfolk won the toss and decided to bat
- Rain prevented any play on the first day until 2:55 P.M., and on the second day until 3:50 P.M.

When rain prevented the match being played out, Norfolk were declared champions by virtue of their first innings lead.

== Leading batsmen (qualification 20 innings) ==
1913 English season leading batsmen
Name	Team	Matches	Innings	Not outs	Runs	Highest score	Average	100s
Phil Mead	Hampshire	32	60	8	2627	171 not out	50.51	9
Jack Hobbs	Surrey	32	57	5	2605	184	50.09	9
George Gunn	Nottinghamshire	22	39	5	1697	170	49.91	6
Eric Leslie Kidd	Cambridge University; Middlesex	14	24	3	1041	150	49.57	3
Frank Woolley	Kent	29	45	6	1760	224 not out	45.12	4
Reginald Lagden	Cambridge University	11	20	1	847	153	44.57	3
J. W. Hearne	Middlesex	29	49	3	2036	189	44.26	6
John Gunn	Nottinghamshire	21	38	6	1405	126	43.90	3
Wally Hardinge	Kent	32	56	7	2037	268	41.57	7
Frank Tarrant	Middlesex; MCC	26	42	2	1630	142	40.75	3

== Leading bowlers (qualification 1,000 balls) ==
1913 English season leading bowlers
Name	Team	Matches	Balls bowled	Runs conceded	Wickets taken	Average	Best bowling	5 wickets in innings	10 wickets in match
Basil von Melle	Oxford University	9	2102	875	55	15.90	7/48	7	1
Colin Blythe	Kent	34	6722	2729	167	16.34	7/21	15	3
Norman Holloway	Sussex	12	2021	931	55	16.92	6/104	5	0
Alonzo Drake	Yorkshire	32	4908	1965	116	16.93	8/59	6	0
Frank Tarrant	Middlesex; MCC	26	5919	2323	136	17.08	8/20	12	3
Sidney Smith	Northamptonshire	24	5160	1915	111	17.25	7/39	8	3
Razor Smith	Surrey	13	2774	1127	65	17.33	8/61	6	3
George Thompson	Northamptonshire	23	5872	2569	148	17.35	7/39	16	6
Albert Relf	Sussex	34	7322	2552	141	18.09	6/30	8	2
Douglas Carr	Kent	11	1814	1102	60	18.36	6/88	6	1

== Annual reviews ==
- John Wisden's Cricketer's Almanack, 1914
