= Leslie Jenkins =

Leslie Jenkins may refer to:

- Leslie Jenkins (cricketer) (1898–1971), Welsh cricketer
- Leslie Jenkins (businessman) (1910–1978), English businessman and public official
