= Benskin =

Benskin is a surname. Notable people with the surname include:

- Sammy Benskin (1922–1992), American pianist and bandleader
- Tyrone Benskin (born 1958), English-Canadian actor and politician
- William Benskin (1880–1956), English cricketer

== See also ==
- Benskins Brewery, English brewery
