= Andrew Hignell =

English cricket historian

Andrew Keith Hignell (born 12 October 1959 in Gloucester) is a cricket historian and scorer.

Hignell has a PhD in Geography from Cardiff University. He has been the Glamorgan 1st XI scorer since 1982. For over 25 years he combined a career as a teacher at independent schools with working on radio commentaries for BBC Radio Wales on the home and away matches of Glamorgan. In 2004 he left full-time teaching at Wells Cathedral School to become the Heritage and Education Co-Ordinator at Glamorgan Cricket, where he manages the Museum of Welsh Cricket at Sophia Gardens in Cardiff.

Hignell has written numerous books on cricket. In Wisden Cricketers' Almanack, Alan Ross said Hignell's 1995 biography of Glamorgan's combative post-war captain Wilf Wooller, which was based on extensive interviews, revealed a "surprising warmth" in its subject. Wisden's editor Graeme Wright, reviewing Hignell's 2001 biography of Malcolm Turnbull, praised Hignell as "a thorough researcher and a sound writer", adding that Hignell gets Turnbull "just right". Reviewing Hignell's 2002 book Rain Stops Play, Wisden Cricket Monthly said, "Hignell's excellent volume should be required reading in both dressing-room and press box", and added that it was "a history of cricket with a strong geographical bias". The Welsh historian John Idris Jones, writing in Planet, said of Hignell's Cricket in Wales (2008), "As a chronicle of cricket in Wales, it is not likely to be surpassed", while Duncan Stone, reviewing Cricket in Wales in the journal Sport in History, said "Hignell's obviously exhaustive research informs, illuminates and entertains".

Hignell was awarded The Association of Cricket Statisticians and Historians' 1988 Statistician of the Year award "for his work on the history and statistics of Glamorgan".

== Books ==
- Cricket Grounds of Glamorgan (1986)
- The History of Glamorgan County Cricket Club (1988)
- A "Favourit" Game: Cricket in South Wales before 1914 (1992)
- J.C. Clay: His Record Innings-by-Innings (1992)
- A Who's Who of Glamorgan County Cricket Club 1888–1991 (1992)
- Glamorgan County Cricket Club: First-Class Records 1921-1993 (1994)
- The Skipper: A Biography of Wilf Wooller (1995)
- Glamorgan County Cricket Club: The Second Selection (1998)
- 100 Greats: Glamorgan County Cricket Club (2000)
- Turnbull: A Welsh Sporting Hero (2001)
- Classics: Glamorgan County Cricket Club (2001)
- Rain Stops Play: Cricketing Climates (2002)
- 100 Greats: Gloucestershire County Cricket Club (2002, with Adrian Thomas)
- 100 First-Class Umpires (2003)
- Summer of '64: A Season in English Cricket (2005)
- Getting it Right (2006; assisted with Barrie Meyer's autobiography)
- Glamorgan Grounds: The Homes of Welsh Cricket (2002)
- Glamorgan: The Glory Years 1993–2002 (2003)
- Gloucestershire CCC: 50 of the Finest Matches (2004)
- Cardiff Sporting Greats (2007)
- Cricket in Wales: An Illustrated History (2008)
- From Sophia to SWALEC: A History of Cricket in Cardiff (2009)
- C.P. Lewis: The Champion Cricketer of South Wales (2009, with Bob Harragan)
- The Australian Cricketers in Wales (2009)
- Glamorgan CCC on this Day: History, Facts and Figures for Every Day of the Year (2011)
- Jack Mercer: A Bowler of Magical Spells (2011)
- The History of Blaina Cricket Club (2012, with Emma Peplow)
- Glamorgan CCC Miscellany: Glamorgan Trivia, History, Facts and Stats (2014)
- Changing Faces: Glamorgan CCC 1888–2012 (2013)
- "Lucky" Jim Pleass: The Memoirs of Glamorgan's 1948 County Championship Winner (2014)
- Front Foot to Front Line: Welsh Cricket and the Great War (2017)
- Always Amongst Friends: The Cardiff and County Club 1866-2016 (2017)
- The Daffodil Blooms: The Glorious Rise of Glamorgan CCC to County Champions in 1948 (2018, with Brian Halford)
- Glamorgan Cricketers 1889–1920 (2019)
- Glamorgan Cricketers 1921–1948 (2020)
- A Tall Story: The Life of Nigel Plews (2020)
- Cricketscapes: The Changing Geography of Cricket in England and Wales (2020)
- Fly at a Higher Game: The Story of TAL Whittington and the Elevation of Glamorgan CCC into the County Championship (2021)
- Glamorgan Cricketers 1949–1979 (2023)
- Glamorgan Cricketers 1980–1997 (2023)
- Mr Wooller's Legacy: A History of Cricket at Colwyn Bay and in Denbighshire (2023, with David Parry)
- The Dream that Died: Gwilym Rowland and Welsh Cricket (2025)
- Glamorgan Cricketers 1998–2012 (2025)
- The Hills of Rookwood: An Exceptional Sporting Family (2025)
