= Frank Harry =

English cricketer

Personal information
- Born: 22 December 1876; Newton Abbot, Devon, England
- Died: 27 October 1925 (aged 48); Great Malvern, Worcestershire, England
- Batting: Right-handed
- Bowling: Right arm medium

Domestic team information
- Years: Team
- 1903–1908: Lancashire
- 1919–1920: Worcestershire

Career statistics
Competition	FC
Matches	76
Runs scored	1,605
Batting average	15.14
100s/50s	0/5
Top score	88
Balls bowled	10,138
Wickets	215
Bowling average	19.01
5 wickets in innings	14
10 wickets in match	1
Best bowling	9/44
Catches/stumpings	39/0
- Source: , 23 June 2008

Frank Harry (22 December 1876 – 27 October 1925) was an English cricketer, who played 69 first-class games for Lancashire in the early years of the 20th century, and then another seven for Worcestershire just after the First World War. He also turned out for Durham in the Minor Counties Championship between 1912 and 1914. After his retirement from playing, he stood in 21 games as an umpire, all in 1921.

== Early career ==
Harry made his first-class debut for Lancashire against Gloucestershire at Aigburth at the end of July 1903. The game was badly affected by rain and was drawn; Harry did not bat, and his only wicket was that of Frank Thomas. He played a handful more games during the following two seasons, but failed to set the cricketing world on fire.

== Prime ==
1906 was a completely different story, and indeed it was to prove a far more successful season for Harry. He scored a career-best 767 runs at 20.18, including three half-centuries, the highest of these (and of his career) being the 88 he hit against Worcestershire in June. However, the highlight of his batting season came at Blackpool at the end of the summer, when in Lancashire's game against an England XI, he hit an unbeaten 64 in the second innings to guide the county to a tie.

With the ball Harry also enjoyed success in 1906. Without doubt his finest hour came against Warwickshire at Old Trafford in May. In a low-scoring match (which was over inside two days) he claimed 6/26 in the first innings, following it up with 9/44 in the second. This remained his career best, as did his match figures of 15/70. He managed five-wicket hauls on two other occasions, and finished the summer with 87 wickets (another career best) at an average of 19.63.

In 1907, Harry was similarly successful with the ball, picking up 84 wickets at 16.58, taking five in an innings on no fewer than eight occasions; this time his best return was at Eastbourne, where he achieved a superb first-innings analysis of 29.4–16–26–7; none of the other four bowlers in that innings managed an economy rate of under two. However, he played much less in 1908 and took only 31 wickets, and after that season played no more for Lancashire.

== Later playing career and umpiring ==
Indeed, despite the aforementioned short spell with Durham between 1912 and 1914, Harry did not appear in first-class cricket again until after the First World War. When cricket resumed in 1919, he was with a new county, Worcestershire, but he did not find success there. He played only eight times for his new side, and his best innings figures were just 3/60, achieved against Somerset at Worcester in July 1919. After three unsuccessful games in 1920, Harry's first-class playing career was at an end. He stood for one season as an umpire, and died a few years later at the early age of 48.
