= William Gemmill =

Welsh cricketer

Personal information
- Full name: William Neilson Gemmill
- Born: 14 June 1900; Thio, New Caledonia
- Died: 18 September 1987 (aged 87); Canterbury, Kent, England
- Batting: Right-handed
- Bowling: Right-arm medium-fast

Domestic team information
- Years: Team
- 1923: Wales
- 1920–1926: Glamorgan

Career statistics
Competition	First-class
Matches	48
Runs scored	1,243
Batting average	14.28
100s/50s	–/5
Top score	77
Balls bowled	132
Wickets	–
Bowling average	–
5 wickets in innings	–
10 wickets in match	–
Best bowling	–
Catches/stumpings	31/–
- Source: Cricinfo, 28 August 2011

William Neilson Gemmill (14 June 1900 – 18 September 1987) was a Welsh cricketer. Gemmill was a right-handed batsman who bowled right-arm medium-fast. He was born in Thio on the French Pacific island of New Caledonia.

== Cricket ==
Gemmill made his debut for Glamorgan when the Welsh county was still a Minor county, making his first appearance for the county against Cheshire in the 1920 Minor Counties Championship. He played a further match for the county that season, against Devon. After the 1920 season, Glamorgan were given first-class status for the 1921 season. It was in this season that Gemmill made his first-class debut in the County Championship against Leicestershire. He played first-class cricket for Glamorgan from 1921 to 1926, making 47 first-class appearances. In his 47 first-class matches for Glamorgan, he scored 1,169 runs at an average of 13.59, with a high score of 77. This score, one of four fifties he scored for Glamorgan, came against Sussex in the 1922 County Championship. He also made a single first-class appearance for Wales in 1923 against Scotland. In this match, he scored 74 runs in the Welsh first-innings, before being dismissed by John Fergusson, with Wales winning by an innings and 111 runs.

== Other work ==
Gemmill was a member of the Institution of Mechanical Engineers, and was at one time senior workshop superintendent at the Anglo Iranian Oil Company.

== Personal life ==
Having previously lived at Northwood, Middlesex, he died in Canterbury, Kent, England on 18 September 1987. His grandson is the actor Tristan Gemmill.
