= Arthur Creber =

Welsh cricketer

Personal information
- Full name: Arthur Brynley Creber
- Born: 11 October 1909; Sketty, Swansea, Glamorgan, Wales
- Died: 10 August 1966 (aged 56); Colwyn Bay, Denbighshire, Wales
- Batting: Right-handed
- Bowling: Right-arm medium
- Relatives: Harry Creber (father)

International information

Domestic team information
- Years: Team
- 1929: Glamorgan

Career statistics
Competition	FC
Matches	2
Runs scored	45
Batting average	11.25
100s/50s	–/–
Top score	23
Balls bowled	156
Wickets	1
Bowling average	80.00
5 wickets in innings	–
10 wickets in match	–
Best bowling	1/80
Catches/stumpings	1/–
- Source: Cricinfo, 3 July 2010

Arthur Brynley Creber (11 October 1909 - 10 August 1966) was a Welsh cricketer, who played for Glamorgan and Scotland. Creber was a right-handed batsman who bowled right-arm medium pace.

== Biography ==
Arthur Brynley Creber was born on 11 October 1909 at Sketty, in Swansea, Glamorgan. He was the son of the cricketer, Harry Creber.

Creber made a single first-class appearance for Glamorgan in 1929 against Leicestershire.

After moving to Scotland he played a single first-class match for the Scotland national cricket team against Yorkshire, a match in which he took his only first-class wicket at the cost of 88 runs.

Creber died at Colwyn Bay, Denbighshire on 10 August 1966.

== Family ==
His father, Harry Creber, played Minor Counties Cricket and first-class cricket for Glamorgan.
