= Norman Holloway =

English cricketer

Norman James Holloway (11 November 1889 – 17 August 1964) was an English cricketer active from 1910 to 1928 who played for Sussex. He was born in Wandsworth Common and died in Walton-on-the-Hill. He appeared in 102 first-class matches as a righthanded batsman who bowled right arm fast. He scored 1,227 runs with a highest score of 55 and took 324 wickets with a best performance of eight for 99.
