= John Newstead =

English cricketer

Personal information
- Full name: John Thomas Newstead
- Born: 8 September 1877; Marton, Yorkshire, England
- Died: 25 March 1952 (aged 74); Blackburn, Lancashire, England
- Batting: Right-handed
- Bowling: Right-arm off-break; Right-arm medium

Career statistics
Competition	First-class
Matches	109
Runs scored	2,104
Batting average	16.18
100s/50s	1/6
Top score	100*
Balls bowled	15,556
Wickets	310
Bowling average	19.18
5 wickets in innings	14
10 wickets in match	4
Best bowling	7/10
Catches/stumpings	83/–
- Source: CricketArchive, 8 December 2022

John Thomas Newstead (8 September 1877 – 25 March 1952) was an English first-class cricketer, who played 96 first-class matches for Yorkshire County Cricket Club between 1903 and 1913. An all-rounder who batted in the middle order, he was selected as one of Wisden Cricketers of the Year for 1909.

== Life and career ==
Newstead was born in Marton, Middlesbrough, Yorkshire. He learned the game under the tutorship of William Brunton - a North Riding cricketer of good local repute in the days of the England eleven. He made such rapid progress that aged seventeen he was given an engagement with Middlesbrough C.C. He was given two trials for the county in 1903 against Cambridge University and Derbyshire, but he was treated as a batsman and not as a bowler. As a result of the mistake he was not kept on.

He was then on the Marylebone Cricket Club (MCC) staff until 1906. Playing eight times for the club, he met with moderate results and was not regularly used as a bowler. The turning point in his career was an engagement in Ireland in 1907. In twelve weeks' engagement with Woodbrook Bray C.C. he took over a hundred wickets and his possibilities as a bowler were realised by the Yorkshire authorities.

His emergence in 1908 was prefigured by an extraordinary analysis of 7 wickets for 10 runs against Worcestershire at Bradford, on his recall to the Yorkshire team at the end of the 1907 campaign. In 1908 he made 927 runs and took 140 wickets and was a big factor in Yorkshire's regaining the County Championship. A bowler of near medium pace, he also imparted the then fashionable in-duckers, or quick off spin.

However, Newstead's great season proved to be something of a flash in the pan, for he took only 151 further wickets. He lost his place before the end of 1909: he averaged only fourteen with the bat, and did not appear regularly again, making his final first-class, and only appearance of the season, in 1913.

In 1914 he joined Rishton Cricket Club in the Lancashire League, taking 94 wickets at 7.57, and he later appeared for Lidget Green and East Bierley, then on to Church Cricket Club from 1919 to 1921 and finally Haslingden in 1922.

Newstead died in Blackburn, Lancashire, in March 1952. He did not receive an obituary in Wisden until one appeared in the special "Supplementary Obituaries" section in the 1994 edition.

== Bibliography ==
- A History of Yorkshire Cricket by Tony Woodhouse
