= Frank Pinch =

English cricketer

Frank Pinch (24 February 1891 – 8 October 1961) was an English cricketer. He was a right-handed batsman and a right-arm medium-pace bowler who played for Glamorgan. He was born in Bodmin and died in Ashford, Kent.

Pinch began playing club cricket for Barry, and was called up by Glamorgan in 1920, their final season as a Minor County, scoring his maiden century against Wiltshire. A teacher by profession, he was at that time working as a teacher in Kent, but found enough time to make the trip to Glamorgan to play on several occasions, having made acquaintance with a Glamorgan official.

In 1921, Pinch became the first Glamorgan batsman to hit a century on his debut first-class match, at home against Worcestershire in Glamorgan's first season of County Cricket – the only debut century for the team for sixty-four years. This was, however, the only century of his career, and the only season in which he would rack up ten first-class appearances.

Pinch continued to bat in the Glamorgan middle-order, scoring well during this first season, but from this point on his first-class averages tailed off, though his club averages remained consistently high. However, in each but his last season, his best scores for the season were in or around the half-century mark, until the last season he played, 1926, in which professional non-cricketing commitments took over more of his time.
