= William Gouldsworthy =

English cricketer (1892–1969)

Personal information
- Full name: William Robert Gouldsworthy
- Born: 20 May 1892; Bristol
- Died: 4 February 1969 (aged 76); Bournemouth, Hampshire
- Batting: Right-handed
- Bowling: Right-arm medium-pace

Domestic team information
- Years: Team
- 1921–1929: Gloucestershire
- Source: Cricinfo, 26 March 2014

William Robert Gouldsworthy (20 May 1892 – 4 February 1969) was an English cricketer. He played 26 first-class matches for Gloucestershire between 1921 and 1929.
