= Arthur O'Bree =

Welsh cricketer (1886–1943)

Personal information
- Full name: Arthur Edwin O'Bree
- Born: 31 May 1886; Poona, Bombay Presidency, British India
- Died: 27 December 1943 (aged 57); Vereeniging, Transvaal, South Africa
- Batting: Right-handed

Domestic team information
- Years: Team
- 1921–1923: Glamorgan

Career statistics
Competition	First-class
Matches	18
Runs scored	431
Batting average	13.06
100s/50s	0/0
Top score	42*
Catches/stumpings	9/–
- Source: CricketArchive, 24 November 2023

Arthur O'Bree (31 May 1886 — 27 December 1943) was an Indian-born English cricketer who played first-class cricket for Glamorgan. He was born in Bombay Presidency and died in Vereeniging, South Africa.

He debuted for Glamorgan in the 1920 Minor Counties Championship season, in which he played four games for the side. He also played in six miscellaneous matches during the season, including a Gentlemen v. Players fixture, and three further matches against Welsh sides.

O'Bree's first-class debut came against Sussex in the 1921 season, in which he scored a duck in the first innings, and was bowled out by the younger Gilligan brother, four-time Test representative Harold in the second. He picked up towards the end of the season and, the following year, scored a career best 42 not out against Worcestershire. Glamorgan finished second bottom of the County Championship in 1922, with no improvement the following year when O'Bree played his final matches.

O'Bree was a military colonel who, prior to his County Championship engagements, was engaged in colonial service in his native country.
