= Jock Tait =

Scottish cricketer (1886–1945)

Personal information
- Full name: John Robert Tait
- Born: 20 November 1886; Lerwick, Shetland, Scotland
- Died: 13 April 1945 (aged 58); Clifton, Bristol, England
- Batting: Right-handed
- Bowling: Right-arm off break
- Role: Batsman

Domestic team information
- Years: Team
- 1921–1926: Glamorgan
- FC debut: 18 May 1921 Glamorgan v Sussex
- Last FC: 16 June 1926 Glamorgan v Warwickshire

Career statistics
Competition	First-class
Matches	44
Runs scored	1,477
Batting average	18.23
100s/50s	0/7
Top score	96
Balls bowled	132
Wickets	1
Bowling average	87.00
5 wickets in innings	0
10 wickets in match	0
Best bowling	1/5
Catches/stumpings	21/–
- Source: CricketArchive, 11 December 2009

John Robert Tait (20 November 1886 – 13 April 1945) was a Scottish cricketer who played in English and Welsh leagues. A right-hand bat and occasional right-arm off break bowler, Tait played forty four first class cricket matches for Glamorgan between 1921 and 1926, having played minor county cricket for the club since 1911. He played in Glamorgan's inaugural County Championship match in 1921 and was dismissed for 96, four runs from being the county's first centurion. In his entire career, he scored 1,477 runs at 18.23 including seven half-centuries.

A skilled sportsman, Tait played both cricket and rugby for Swansea, Cardiff Corinthians and Newport. He played for the Welsh Amateur Football team against England in 1913. Following retirement, he ran an insurance company in Cardiff and Swansea.

== Career ==
Tait was born at Lerwick, Shetland in Scotland. He played amateur cricket for Swansea, and football in Cardiff and Newport. He played at Cardiff Arms Park on 22 June 1910 for a Cardiff and Ground XI cricket team against Sammy Woods' XI. Tait took a wicket with his bowling and scored an unbeaten 22 batting at number eight.

In 1911, he joined Glamorgan, then a minor county. On 30 June he made his debut against Monmouthshire. He made zero, and took one catch. He went on to play 26 minor county matches either side of the First World War, ending in 1920.

On 18 May 1921, Glamorgan – now a first class club – faced Sussex at Cardiff Arms Park. Glamorgan, batting first, reached 272 thanks to Tait scoring 31 in the first innings. Tait took a catch to dismiss George Stannard at Sussex fell to 152 all out, and in reply Glamorgan reached 213 thanks to a knock of 96 from Tait. He was bowled by Maurice Tate four short of becoming Glamorgan's first centurion and a centurion on debut. Tait played 10 further matches that season, scoring 438 runs at 23.05, including a second half-century.

Tait scored 452 more runs in 1922 at 18.83, with two further half centuries and a best of 67, followed by 359 runs at 17.09 and two further fifties in 1923. His career gradually declined from 1924 as he began his career in insurance, with two matches that season yielding 23 runs. In 1925 he played four games, scoring 141 runs at 17.62 with one final half-century, and in 1925 played three further matches. In his final game, on 16 June, he faced Warwickshire. Batting at three, he made six runs. He continued to work in a "thriving" insurance business in Cardiff and Swansea. He died in 1945 at Clifton in Bristol aged 58.
