= John Barnes (English cricketer) =

English cricketer

John Reginald Barnes (18 May 1897 – 22 July 1945) was an English cricketer who was active from 1919 to 1931. He was born in Ormskirk and died in Grange-over-Sands. He made his first-class debut in 1919 and appeared in 94 matches as a right-handed batsman who bowled leg break, playing for Lancashire and Marylebone Cricket Club (MCC). In 1921 The Cricketer reported “that since his return from America the old Marlburian has been scoring well” and that his 111 v Worcestershire in June was faultless, although his 98 against the better bowlers of Surrey was of even greater merit. They prophesied a great future, but as an amateur he never played regularly enough to score 1000 runs in a season. He scored 3,643 runs with a highest score of 133 among four centuries and took no wickets with a best performance of none for 0.
