= William Wells (cricketer) =

English cricketer

William Wells (14 March 1881 – 18 March 1939) was an English cricketer active from 1904 to 1926 who played for Northamptonshire (Northants).

== Biography ==
He was born in Daventry, Northamptonshire on 14 March 1881 and died there on 18 March 1939, aged 58. Wells appeared in 269 first-class matches as a righthanded batsman who bowled right arm fast medium pace. He scored 6,324 runs with a highest score of 119, one of two centuries, and took 751 wickets with a best performance of eight for 35.
