= Edgar Cooper =

Welsh cricketer

Personal information
- Full name: Edgar Cooper
- Born: 12 November 1891; Briton Ferry, Neath Port Talbot, Wales
- Died: 15 March 1959 (aged 67); Kettering, Northamptonshire, England
- Batting: Right-handed
- Bowling: Right-arm fast-medium

Domestic team information
- Years: Team
- 1921: Glamorgan

Career statistics
Competition	FC
Matches	4
Runs scored	46
Batting average	5.75
100s/50s	–/–
Top score	14
Balls bowled	684
Wickets	10
Bowling average	40.60
5 wickets in innings	–
10 wickets in match	–
Best bowling	4/61
Catches/stumpings	3/–
- Source: Cricinfo, 30 June 2010

Edgar Cooper (12 November 1891 – 15 March 1959) was a Welsh cricketer. Cooper was a right-handed batsman who bowled right-arm fast-medium. He was born at Briton Ferry, Glamorgan.

Cooper made his debut for Glamorgan in the 1912 Minor Counties Championship against Monmouthshire at Cardiff Arms Park. In 1913 he played a further Minor Counties match for Glamorgan against the same opposition.

He made his first-class debut for Glamorgan in 1921 against Sussex, in Glamorgan's inaugural first-class match. He played 3 further first-class matches for the county in 1923, with his final match for Glamorgan coming against Worcestershire. In his four first-class matches he scored 46 runs at a batting average of 5.75, with a high score of 14. In the field he took three catches With the ball he took 10 wickets at a bowling average of 40.60, with best figures of 4/61.

Cooper died at Kettering, Northamptonshire on 15 March 1959.
