= Harry Symonds (cricketer) =

Welsh cricketer

Henry George Symonds (24 June 1889 – 1 January 1945) was a Welsh cricketer who played first-class cricket for Glamorgan and Wales in the 1920s.

Symonds played in Glamorgan's inaugural County Championship match, against Sussex in 1921, scoring 58 in the first innings (Glamorgan's first Championship fifty) and 20 in the second, valuable contributions to Glamorgan's first victory. He had previously made one first-class appearance for South Wales in 1912, and played for Glamorgan at minor counties level from 1908 to 1920, while he also played one minor match for Devon in 1924.

After retiring from cricket, Symonds was the manager of the Cardiff Arms Park Greyhound Racing Company.
