= Humphrey Gilbert (cricketer) =

Indian-English cricketer (1886–1960)

Cricket information
- Batting: Right-handed
- Bowling: Right-arm off-break; Right-arm medium

Career statistics
Competition	First-class
Matches	118
Runs scored	811
Batting average	7.05
100s/50s	0/0
Top score	35*
Balls bowled	24,820
Wickets	476
Bowling average	23.76
5 wickets in innings	38
10 wickets in match	8
Best bowling	8/48
Catches/stumpings	59/–
- Source: CricketArchive, 6 December 2022

Humphrey Adam Gilbert (2 June 1886 – 19 July 1960) was an Indian-born English first-class cricketer who played in 118 matches. All of these were in England, with the majority for Worcestershire and Oxford University. Very much a specialist bowler, his Wisden obituary commented that "His qualities as a batsman [could] be gauged from the fact that in his five innings against Cambridge he scored one run." He was nicknamed Barmy Gilbert.

Gilbert was born in Malabar Hill, Bombay (now Mumbai), but was educated in England, at Charterhouse, before going on to Christ Church, Oxford.

He made his first-class debut for Oxford against Lancashire at the Christ Church ground in May 1907, taking the single wicket of Harry Dean. A little later in the summer, he took what was to remain a career-best innings haul of 8–48 against Marylebone Cricket Club (MCC) at The University Parks. Gilbert maintained his place in the Oxford side throughout that and the following two seasons, winning his Blue in each year and topping Oxford's bowling averages in 1908 and 1909. He twice took six wickets in an innings in the University Match against Cambridge at Lord's: in 1907 he took 6–36, while two years later he claimed 6–52.

While still at Oxford, he also made the first of his four appearances in the Gentlemen v Players match, and in this game – at The Oval in July 1908 – he took 3–43 and 6–112 to help the Gentlemen to a six-wicket victory. Also, in May 1909, he claimed innings figures of 8–71 for his university against the touring Australians, and as a result was put on standby for the first Test at Edgbaston, although he was not in the end called upon to play.

After coming down from Oxford at the end of 1909, Gilbert concentrated on his career as a barrister and played only a handful of matches each season up until the First World War. These games came for the likes of MCC, Free Foresters and Gentlemen of England, though he also made a single (and unsuccessful) appearance for Minor Counties against the South Africans in 1912. On the resumption of first-class cricket in 1919, Gilbert played a few more games for such teams, but he made no appearances at all the following season.

In 1921, Gilbert made his county cricket debut with Worcestershire, and played a considerable number of games for the county in that and the following summer. Apart from one game for MCC against Oxford in 1921, and one for Free Foresters against Cambridge in 1922, all his matches during this period were for Worcestershire. He enjoyed considerable success, taking 84 first-class wickets at 24.54 and 85 first-class wickets at 28.55 in the respective years, with a best bowling performance of 7–60 for Worcestershire against Nottinghamshire at Worcester in August 1921. Gilbert captained the county against Derbyshire at the same venue a year later.

He played a few further games for Worcestershire in 1923 and turned out just once in 1924, after which he was entirely absent from first-class cricket for four years. He returned in 1928, continuing with Worcestershire, and played a large proportion of the 1929 season, but he was not a particular success and only twice took more than three wickets in an innings. He made one last first-class appearance in the spring of 1930, when he endured a grim farewell against the Australians: Worcestershire were crushed by an innings and 165 runs as Bradman hit 236 – his first century in England – while Gilbert bowled only four overs, which disappeared for 30. With the bat he was bowled for nought in his first innings and was absent hurt in the second.

Gilbert died in Bishopstone, Herefordshire at the age of 74.
