= John Whiteside (cricketer) =

English cricketer

John Parkinson Whiteside (11 June 1861 – 8 March 1946) was an English cricketer active from 1888 to 1906 who played for Lancashire and Leicestershire. He was born in Fleetwood, Lancashire and died in Leicester. He appeared in 231 first-class matches as a righthanded batsman who kept wicket. He scored 1,362 runs with a highest score of 50 and completed 337 catches with 101 stumpings.
