= Charles Marshall (Surrey cricketer) =

English cricketer (1863–1948)

Charles Marshall (1 October 1863 – 20 November 1948) was an English first-class cricketer active 1893–99 who played for Surrey as a wicketkeeper. He was born in Woodville; died in Birmingham.
