= William Bates (cricketer) =

English cricketer

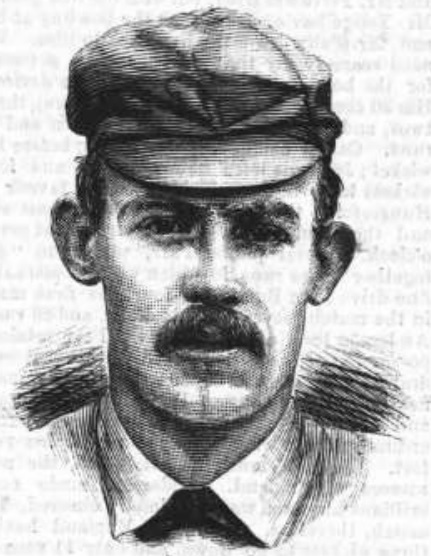

Personal information
- Full name: William Ederick Bates
- Born: 5 March 1884; Kirkheaton, Yorkshire, England
- Died: 17 January 1957 (aged 72); Belfast, Northern Ireland
- Batting: Right-handed
- Bowling: Slow left-arm orthodox
- Relatives: Billy Bates (father)

Domestic team information
- Years: Team
- 1933–1936: Cheshire
- 1923–1930: Wales
- 1920–1931: Glamorgan
- 1911: Marylebone Cricket Club
- 1907–1913: Yorkshire

Career statistics
Competition	First-class
Matches	406
Runs scored	15,964
Batting average	24.40
100s/50s	13/78
Top score	200*
Balls bowled	12,915
Wickets	230
Bowling average	37.70
5 wickets in innings	4
10 wickets in match	–
Best bowling	8/93
Catches/stumpings	253/–
- Source: Cricinfo, 11 June 2012

William Ederick Bates (5 March 1884 – 17 January 1957) was an English first-class cricketer who played for Yorkshire, Wales and most notably, Glamorgan, over a long career from 1907 to 1931. He was the son of Billy Bates, another notable Yorkshire born cricketer.

== Life and cricket career ==
Bates was born in Kirkheaton, Yorkshire, England. He played 113 games for his native county between 1907 and 1913, scoring 2,634 runs at 17.32 with a highest score of 81. Although he developed into a fine left arm orthodox spinner, he hardly bowled before World War I, taking two wickets for Yorkshire.

He joining Briton Ferry Steel C.C. in 1914, as the War shut down first-class cricket for four years. He served as a sergeant in the Royal Engineers during the war. Bates qualified for Glamorgan over this time, and found a regular spot as a determined opening batsman and useful spinner as cricket resumed after the war. Though he scored a thousand runs in 1923; without reaching a century in 1927, he became the first Glamorgan batsman to record a ton in each innings, with 105 and 111 against Essex. He reached his peak as a batsman in this year, recording a double hundred against Worcestershire at Kidderminster, and another ton against Nottinghamshire to finish the summer with 1,645 runs to his account. He also passed the 1,500 runs mark in 1928, and began a most prolific partnership with a fellow Tyke, Arnold Dyson. The pair took delight in sharing a stand of 233 for the first wicket against Yorkshire, at Sheffield, in 1930. He played 283 first-class matches for Glamorgan, scoring 12,600 runs at 25.97 with ten centuries in all.

Bates became a useful left-arm spinner, taking 8 for 93 against Essex in 1928, and was a most reliable fielder close to the wicket. He took 224 wickets for Glamorgan, with a best of 8 for 93, at 37.53. He took 5 wickets in an innings four times. In all first-class cricket, including a game for the Marylebone Cricket Club (MCC) and H. D. G. Leveson Gower's XI, he scored 15,964 runs at 24.4 in 406 matches, and took 230 wickets at 37.7 each.

Financial straits, rather than any loss in form, caused Glamorgan to release him in 1931, but he continued to play for Cheshire in the Minor Counties, before turning his hand to coaching and groundsmanship in Ulster where he died in January 1957, aged 72.

== Football career ==
William Bates
Personal information
- Positions: Right back; centre forward

Senior career*
Years	Team	Apps	(Gls)
1906–1907	Bolton Wanderers	2	(0)
1907–1909	Leeds City	15	(0)
- * Club domestic league appearances and goals

He was also a useful footballer, playing for Bolton Wanderers and Leeds City. His son Ted Bates both played for and managed Southampton.
