= Harry Tomlinson =

English cricketer

Harry Tomlinson (18 February 1886 – 29 November 1944) was an English cricketer. He was a left-handed batsman and a right-arm offbreak bowler who played for Glamorgan. He was born in Earl Shilton and died in Briton Ferry.

Tomlinson made his Minor Counties debut during 1920, striking 73 against Carmarthenshire during the summer, having previously played as a professional for Briton Ferry Town and Briton Ferry Steel, the two local cricket teams in the Welsh town where he lived for over 25 years.

During the same summer, Tomlinson hit an innings of 73 against Carmarthenshire, and was noticed by Glamorgan, where he moved with immediate effect. Tomlinson made his County Championship debut against Somerset in an innings defeat spearheaded by the opponents' opening pair of Randall Johnson and Sydney Rippon, who each scored centuries in the first innings. Tomlinson played two further matches during the 1921 season, and Glamorgan finished bottom of the County Championship table with just two wins under their belt.

Tomlinson returned to play first-class cricket for the team the following season, lining up to bat in three games, all of which ended in defeat. Amazingly, in the six innings he played in this season, he scored a mere two runs more than in the six the previous year, with an identical highest score of 36. Tomlinson played just two further first-class matches, during 1923, though he did not make much impact with the bat and was soon out of the team.

Tomlinson's hit just one first-class wicket, against Northamptonshire in his first game of 1922.
