= John Fergusson (cricketer) =

Scottish cricketer and wine merchant

Personal information
- Full name: John Alexander Fergusson
- Born: 24 June 1882; Liverpool, Lancashire, England
- Died: 28 April 1947 (aged 64); Perth, Perthshire, Scotland
- Batting: Right-handed
- Bowling: Right-arm medium

Domestic team information
- Years: Team
- 1911–1923: Scotland

Career statistics
| Competition | First-class |
|---|---|
| Matches | 8 |
| Runs scored | 283 |
| Batting average | 20.21 |
| 100s/50s | 1/– |
| Top score | 103* |
| Balls bowled | 521 |
| Wickets | 9 |
| Bowling average | 25.11 |
| 5 wickets in innings | 1 |
| 10 wickets in match | – |
| Best bowling | 5/36 |
| Catches/stumpings | 7/– |
- Source: Cricinfo, 16 June 2022

John Alexander Fergusson (24 June 1882 — 28 April 1947) was a Scottish first-class cricketer.

Fergusson was born to Scottish parents at Liverpool in June 1882. A club cricketer for Perth County Cricket Club, Fergusson made his debut for Scotland against the touring Indians at Galashiels in 1911. The following season he played twice against the touring South Africans, and once against Ireland. Following the First World War and ten years after he last appeared in first-class cricket. Fergusson made two first-class appearances in 1922 against the Marylebone Cricket Club (MCC) and Surrey; the following season he made a further two appearances, against Wales and Middlesex. Described by Wisden as "among the best cricketers ever known in Scotland", Fergusson excelled as a batsman, bowler and fielder. In eight first-class matches, Fergusson scored 283 runs at an average of 20.21, with a highest score of 103 not out which came in 1922 against the MCC at Lord's. With his right-arm medium pace bowling, he took 9 wickets with best figures of 5 for 36, which he took on debut against the Indians. In club cricket for Perthshire, he scored over 10,000 runs.

Outside of cricket, Fergusson was a wine and spirits merchant and the licensee of the Queen's Hotel Bar in Dundee. Fergusson died at his Perth home in April 1947, having been seriously ill for a week or two prior to his death.
