= David Reason =

Welsh cricketer (1897–1955)

Personal information
- Full name: David Jordan Reason
- Born: 14 April 1897; Cadoxton, Neath, Glamorgan, Wales
- Died: 17 February 1955 (aged 57); Blackheath, London, England
- Batting: Right-handed
- Bowling: Right-arm off break
- Role: Wicket-keeper

Domestic team information
- Years: Team
- 1921–1922: Glamorgan

Career statistics
Competition	First-class
Matches	2
Runs scored	3
Batting average	1.00
100s/50s	0/0
Top score	2
Balls bowled	0
Wickets	0
Bowling average
5 wickets in innings
10 wickets in match
Best bowling
Catches/stumpings	3/1
- Source: ESPNcricinfo, 19 June 2026

David Jordan Reason (14 April 1897 – 17 February 1955) was a Welsh cricketer and solicitor. A right-handed batsman, right-arm off break bowler and wicket-keeper, he played first-class cricket for Glamorgan in 1921 and 1922.

== Early life and education ==
Reason was born on 14 April 1897 at Cadoxton, Neath, into a well-known Neath sporting family. He was the son of the owner of the Cape Copper Works at Jersey Marine, Swansea. He was educated at Neath Grammar School and Queen's College, Taunton before reading law at Oxford.

== Cricket career ==
Reason kept wicket for Glamorgan in several of their matches during 1920, the season in which he recorded his Minor Counties career-best of 32 not out against Surrey Second XI at The Oval. He went on to make four appearances in the Minor Counties Championship for the county.

He made two first-class appearances for Glamorgan, one in 1921 and one in 1922, the latter coming against Northamptonshire at Northampton, where he made his highest first-class score of 2. In his two first-class matches he scored 3 runs at a batting average of 1.00, and held three catches with one stumping. He found it difficult to combine first-class cricket with his business commitments, and after his playing career he served on the Glamorgan committee.

== Legal and public career ==
Reason began his legal training in 1919 and opened a solicitor's practice in Neath and Skewen with Tom Whittington, who was his colleague at both Neath Cricket Club and Glamorgan. During the mid-1920s he moved to the London area, becoming Town Clerk of Ilford in 1930. Five years later he took a similar post at Greenwich. He later served as President of the Metropolitan Boroughs Town Clerks' Association and worked with the Midland Bank Executor and Trustee Company.

Reason died at Blackheath, London, on 17 February 1955, aged 57.
