= Leslie Jenkins (businessman) =

English businessman and public official (1910 – 1978)

Leslie Augustus Westover Jenkins, CBE, FRSA (1910 – 10 June 1978) was an English businessman and public official. A managing director of John Wright and Sons (Veneers) Ltd and I. & R. Morley Ltd, he served as president of the National Association of British Manufacturers from 1963 to 1965 and vice-president of the Confederation of British Industry from 1965 to 1968. He served as chairman of the Forestry Commission from 1965 to 1970 and as chairman of the National Industrial Fuel Efficiency Service from 1968 to 1972. He was the Cantor Lecturer at the Royal Society of Arts in 1971.
