= Association of Cricket Statisticians and Historians =

Statistical organisation in cricket

The Association of Cricket Statisticians and Historians (ACS) was founded in England in 1973 for the purpose of researching and collating information about the history and statistics of cricket. Originally called the Association of Cricket Statisticians, the words "and Historians" were added in 1992, but it has continued to use the initialism "ACS."

The ACS is the leading authority on cricket statistics worldwide and a forum for informed discussion on the history of the game and its future.

The ACS headquarters were formerly in Nottingham, opposite Trent Bridge Cricket Ground, but relocated to Cardiff in 2006.. Since the Covid crisis in 2020, all ACS Committee meetings have been held on-line; there is no longer any physical base for the organisation.

Although constituted in England, the ACS has a worldwide membership, and is open to anyone with a relevant interest. Several of the world's leading statisticians and historians are members, including Andrew Hignell.

The ACS celebrated its fiftieth anniversary in 2023 with an event at Leicestershire County Cricket Club; contributions were received from all over the world.

The ACS remains a highly active publisher of cricket books. In 2025 it published the ACS Women's International Cricket Year Book collated by Philip Bailey, which is the first of its kind. In 2026 this book was published on-line.

Other recent publications include:

- ACS Overseas First Class Annual compiled by John Bryant
- The Hills of Rockwood by Andrew Hignell
- Christianity at The Crease by Eric Midwinter
- Fred Bakewell: Among the Bright Colours by Mick Pope
- ACS Women's International Cricket Year Book compiled by Philip Bailey
- A History of Oxfordshire County Cricket by Julian Lawton Smith
- Richard Letby - Ebor's Champion and early Yorkshire cricket by Jeremy Lonsdale

Every quarter the ACS publishes its journal The Cricket Statistician, which features detailed articles on cricket history and statistics as well as book reviews.

The ACS also offers an active on-line forum for its members to discuss statistical and historical matters.

The ACS SubStack feed has become a source of writing on current and historical cricketing matters.

The ACS presents annually "The Brooke Lambert Award" for Statistician or Historian of the Year. In 2025 this was awarded to Andrew Radd, a doyen of Northamptonshire County Cricket Club cricket history and long-time cricket commentator on BBC Northamptonshire. whilst in 2026 "The Brooke Lambert Award" was awarded to Marion Collin, one of the finest statisticians of the women's game.

The ACS runs a selection of auctions for cricket books and related material for its members through a calendar year.

The ACS website is a source of historic and current cricketing data.

The ACS has a large on-line following through its active social-media platforms:

- ACS X Account
- ACS Instagram Account
- ACS Facebook Account
- ACS Threads Account
- ACS Mastodon Account
- ACS Blue Sky Account
- ACS You Tube Account

Current ACS officers include

- David Kendix (President),
- Garry Wallace (Treasurer),
- Jeremy Lonsdale (Secretary),

The current ACS Committee consists of:

- Peter Hardy (Chair of the Committee), (Communications),
- Garry Wallace (Treasurer & Auctions),
- Jeremy Lonsdale (Secretary & Publications),
- Huw Nathan (Membership)
- Derek Noakes (Website & Digital),
- John Winnifrith (Journal)
- Rodney Ulyate (Substack, You Tube & On-Line Meetings)
- Pete Griffiths (Auctions, Website & Digital),
- John Bryant (OFCA & Committee Minute Taker)
- David Griffin (Heritage, Website & Digital)
- Arunabha Sengupta (X Account, On-Line Meetings, Website & Digital)

== Origin ==
Following the formal definition of first-class cricket by the then Imperial Cricket Conference (ICC) in May 1947, and particularly given ICC's statement that "the definition does not have retrospective effect," a number of cricket statisticians became interested in developing an agreed list of matches played before 1947 from which to compile accurate first-class records.

Roy Webber published his Playfair Book of Cricket Records in 1951 and stated his view that first-class cricket records (i.e., for statistical purposes) should not include matches played before 1864. In this first edition, Webber accepted the records used by Wisden Cricketers' Almanack, including those that summarised the career of W G Grace. In his second edition (1961), Webber challenged many existing views about match status and produced, inter alia, an alternative career record for Grace that did not include some of the matches Wisden recognised as first-class.

There was some support among cricket statisticians, including Bill Frindall, for Webber's basic arguments but there were (and remain) differences of opinion about his commencement date and about the details of his recommended match list. The controversial cricket historian Rowland Bowen wrote a lengthy critique of Webber's sources in 1961. Bowen then started Cricket Quarterly (1963–70), devoted to cricket statistics, which included among its contributors some of the original ACS members.

The ACS itself was founded by Robert Brooke and Dennis Lambert, two of Bowen's contributors, by means of advertisements in the October 1972 issues of The Cricketer and Playfair Cricket Monthly. These attracted a nucleus of some 50 members who formed the association in 1973.

The ACS now has over 800 members as of late 2026.

== Scope of activities ==
The ACS is committed to providing its members with enjoyment, interpretation & published research into cricket statistics, the history of the game and its future.

As a result the ACS has sought to compile details of all known historically significant matches, and has widened its scope to include details of other competitions such as the Minor Counties Cricket Championship and the Second XI Championship in England. The bulk of its research concerns those matches that are officially or unofficially recognised as first-class or List A limited overs cricket. The findings have been published in-house in various guides (see list below) and in the Association's quarterly journal The Cricket Statistician. The Who's Who of first-class Cricketers is one of the few commercially published works.

Like Roy Webber and Bill Frindall, the ACS has no official position in terms of deciding the status of cricket matches. Any classification it publishes is merely its own opinion, as is the case with all other cricket writers. However, in 2006, the ICC asked the ACS to provide a comprehensive List A limited overs matchlist since the commencement of List A matches in 1963, and this has since been used as a basis for all official records.

== ACS publications ==
The ACS publishes its many findings in-house, most typically in the form of paperback books. Many books are issued in series format. The publications include the following:

- The Cricket Statistician (a quarterly journal for members)
- A Guide to Important Cricket Matches Played in the British Isles 1707–1863 (1985)
- A Guide to First-Class Cricket Matches Played in the British Isles (1982, 2nd edition)
- A Guide to First-Class Cricket Matches Played in Australia (1983, 2nd edition)
- A Guide to First-Class Cricket Matches Played in India (1986)
- A Guide to First-Class Cricket Matches Played in New Zealand (1981)
- A Guide to First-Class Cricket Matches Played in North and South America (1987)
- A Guide to First-Class Cricket Matches Played in Pakistan (1989)
- A Guide to Important Cricket Matches Played in South Africa (1981)
- A Guide to First-Class Cricket Matches Played in Sri Lanka (1987)
- A Guide to First-Class Cricket Matches Played in the West Indies (1984)
- Complete First-Class Match Lists, 1801–1914 (1996); 1914/15–1944/45 (1997); 1945–1962/63 (1997); 1963–1980/81 (1998); 1981–1998 (1999)
- The ACS International Cricket Yearbook (annual first issued in 1986)
- The ACS Second Eleven Annual (annual first issued in 1985)
- The ACS Famous Cricketers Series (complete playing records match by match of a cricketer – the series ended after 100 books in the series)
- The ACS Lives in Cricket Series (biographies of cricketers who had not previously had such a book published)
- The Minor Counties Championship (a now completed series of the complete scorecards and statistics for each season, starting in 1895)
- Statistical Survey (a detailed statistical survey of each English season – books published covering seasons 1863 to 1881)
- Bangladesh First-Class Matches (scorecards of first-class matches in the country — books published covering seasons 2000/01 to 2006/07)
- Sri Lanka First-Class Matches (scorecards of first-class matches in the country — books published covering seasons 1989/90 to 2007)
- Zimbabwe First-Class Matches (scorecards of first-class matches in the country — books published covering seasons 1993/94 to 2006/07)
- ACS Overseas First-Class Annual (scorecards of first-class matches played outside England first issued for season 2008/09)
- Cricket Grounds (English first-class counties)
- ACS Women's International Cricket Year Book (details of all women's international cricket first issued in 2025)
- Hard to Get Series
- The Greens (featuring the scores from all first class matches)

== See also ==
- Variations in first-class cricket statistics

== Bibliography ==
- ACS, various publications (see list above)
- The Cricketer, monthly magazine, 1961
- Bill Frindall, The Kaye Book of Cricket Records, Kaye & Ward, 1968
- Roy Webber, Playfair Book of Cricket Records, Playfair, 1951 and 1961 editions
- https://crickethistory.website/bibliography/ACS.html
