= Frank Thomas (English cricketer) =

English cricketer

Personal information
- Born: 5 April 1877; Bristol
- Died: 20 May 1924 (aged 47); Bristol
- Batting: Right-handed

Domestic team information
- Years: Team
- 1901-1906: Gloucestershire
- Source: Cricinfo, 30 March 2014

Frank Thomas (5 April 1877 – 20 May 1924) was an English cricketer. He played for Gloucestershire between 1901 and 1906.
