= Francis Marlow =

English cricketer

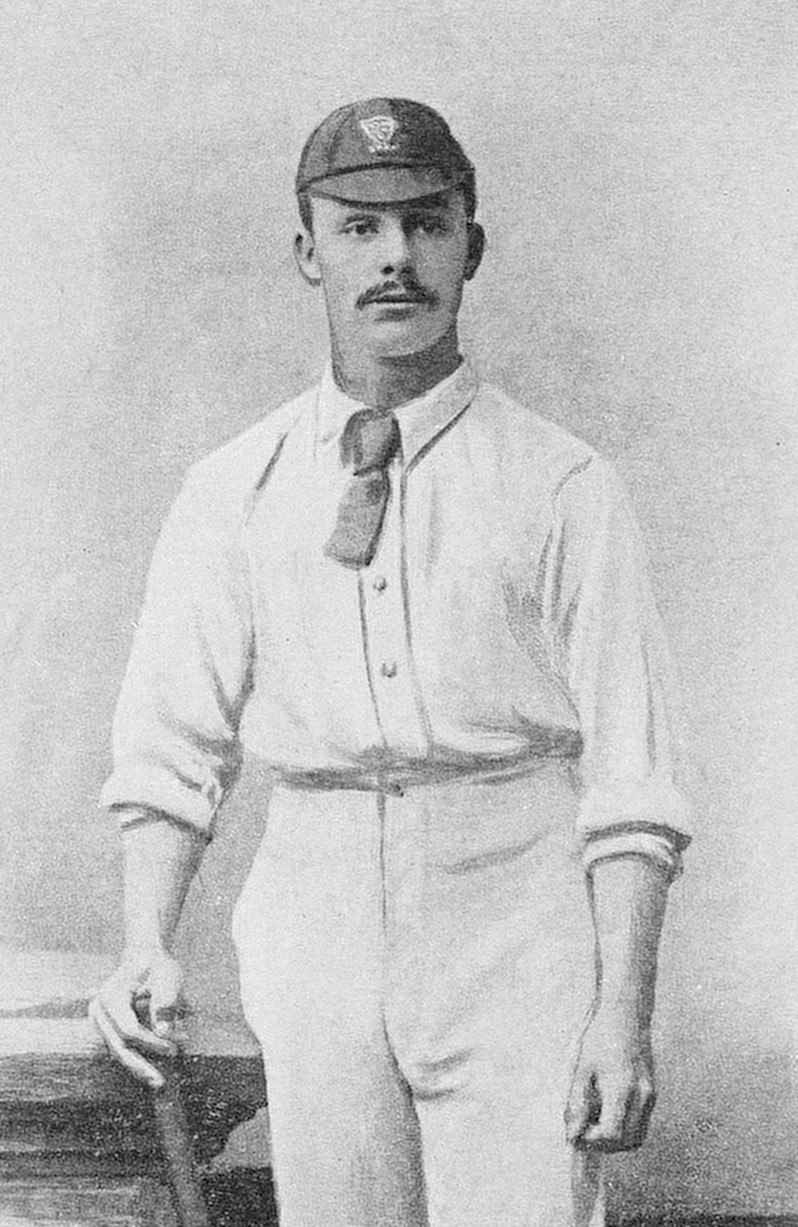

Personal information
- Full name: Francis William Marlow
- Born: 8 October 1867; Tamworth, Staffordshire, England
- Died: 7 August 1952 (aged 84); Hove, Sussex, England
- Batting: Right-handed
- Bowling: Right-arm medium

Domestic team information
- Years: Team
- 1891-1904: Sussex

Career statistics
Competition	First-class
Matches	219
Runs scored	7,890
Batting average	22.16
100s/50s	7/35
Top score	155
Balls bowled	311
Wickets	4
Bowling average	49.00
5 wickets in innings	0
10 wickets in match	0
Best bowling	2/18
Catches/stumpings	65/–
- Source: CricketArchive, 20 July 2012

Francis Marlow (8 October 1867 – 7 August 1952) was an English cricketer who played first-class cricket principally for Sussex He was born at Tamworth in 1867.

== Career ==
Marlow played 219 first-class matches between 1891-1904. The right-handed batsman made 7890 runs at an average of 22.16. His right-arm medium pace bowling took four wickets averaging at 49.00. He died at Hove in Sussex in 1952.
