= Jack Nash (English cricketer) =

English cricketer

Personal information
- Full name: Albert Nash
- Born: 18 September 1873; Blean, Kent, England
- Died: 6 December 1956 (aged 83); Battersea, London, England
- Batting: Right-handed
- Bowling: Right-arm off-break Right-arm medium

Domestic team information
- Years: Team
- 1902–1922: Glamorgan

Career statistics
| Competition | First-class |
|---|---|
| Matches | 36 |
| Runs scored | 315 |
| Batting average | 5.62 |
| 100s/50s | –/– |
| Top score | 28 |
| Balls bowled | 7,270 |
| Wickets | 133 |
| Bowling average | 21.81 |
| 5 wickets in innings | 11 |
| 10 wickets in match | 2 |
| Best bowling | 9/93 |
| Catches/stumpings | 6/– |
- Source: Cricinfo, 15 June 2022

Jack Nash (born Albert Nash; 18 September 1873 – 6 December 1956) was an English cricketer. He was a right-handed batsman and a right-arm medium-pace off-break bowler who played for Glamorgan. He was born in Blean and died in Battersea.

Originally a member of Cardiff Cricket Club in 1900, he quickly became a regular for the side, taking 12 for 77 in 1903, with his combination of expert spin and medium-pace. Nash left Cardiff in 1911, moved to Lancashire, to play for Haslingden, and later to Cardiff to play for Uddingston, where he stayed until 1919.

He made his first-class debut in Glamorgan's first County Championship match, against Sussex in May 1921. At 47 years and 271 days old he was the oldest man ever to make his Championship debut. Nevertheless, he was Glamorgan's leading bowler in 1921, taking 90 wickets – more than twice as many as anyone else for the county that year – at an average of 17.34. He played on in 1922, then retired. He became a first-class umpire in 1926, a position he held until 1930.

Nash was a tailend batsman throughout his career, alongside team-mates such as one-time county cricketer Sam Lowe, who had over 50 Minor Counties appearances to his credit, and later in his career, the likes of Harry Creber.
