= Leslie Jenkins (cricketer) =

Welsh cricketer

Personal information
- Full name: Wyndham Leslie Trevor Jenkins
- Born: 26 August 1898; Newport, Monmouthshire, Wales
- Died: 14 June 1971 (aged 72); Penarth, Glamorgan, Wales
- Batting: Right-handed
- Role: Wicket-keeper

Domestic team information
- Years: Team
- 1921: Glamorgan

Career statistics
Competition	FC
Matches	10
Runs scored	155
Batting average	8.15
100s/50s	–/–
Top score	39
Balls bowled	–
Wickets	–
Bowling average	–
5 wickets in innings	–
10 wickets in match	–
Best bowling	–
Catches/stumpings	8/2
- Source: Cricinfo, 28 June 2010

Wyndham Leslie Trevor Jenkins (26 August 1898 – 14 June 1971) was a Welsh cricketer. Jenkins was a right-handed batsman who played primarily as a wicket-keeper. He was born at Newport, Monmouthshire.

Jenkins represented Glamorgan in 10 first-class matches in 1921, making his debut against Gloucestershire at St. Helen's and playing his final first-class match for the county against Hampshire at Cardiff Arms Park. In his 10 first-class matches he scored 155 runs at a batting average of 8.15 and a high score of 39. Behind the stumps he took 8 catches and made 2 stumpings.

Jenkins died at Penarth, Glamorgan on 14 June 1971.
