= William Benskin =

English cricketer

William Ewart Benskin (8 April 1880 – 1 June 1956) was an English cricketer who played first-class cricket for Leicestershire and Scotland between 1906 and 1924. He was born and died in Leicester. He appeared in 105 first-class matches as a righthanded batsman who bowled right-arm fast. He scored 954 runs with a highest score of 79 not out and took 325 wickets with a best performance of eight for 86.
