= Stamford Hacker =

English cricketer

William Stamford Hacker (8 December 1876 – 8 December 1925) was an English cricketer active from 1899 to 1923 who played for Gloucestershire and Glamorgan. He was born in Chipping Sodbury and died in Bristol. Unusually, he had a 20-year gap between his last appearance for Gloucestershire (1901) and his first for Glamorgan (1921). He made his debut under the captaincy of WG Grace.

He appeared in 25 first-class matches as a righthanded batsman who bowled right arm fast medium. He scored 222 runs with a highest score of 27 and took 91 wickets with a best performance of seven for 84.
