= Johnnie Clay =

Welsh cricketer (1898–1973)

Personal information
- Full name: John Charles Clay
- Born: 18 March 1898; Bonvilston, Cowbridge, Glamorgan, Wales
- Died: 11 August 1973 (aged 75); St Hilary, Glamorgan, Wales
- Batting: Right-handed
- Bowling: Right-arm offbreak, legbreak, googly and fast-medium

International information
- National side: England
- Only Test: 17 August 1935 v South Africa

Domestic team information
- Years: Team
- 1921–1949: Glamorgan

Career statistics
Competition	Tests	First-class
Matches	1	373
Runs scored	0	7,186
Batting average	n/a	15.45
100s/50s	0/0	2/18
Top score	n/a	115*
Balls bowled	192	61,613
Wickets	0	1,317
Bowling average	n/a	19.76
5 wickets in innings	0	105
10 wickets in match	0	28
Best bowling	n/a	9/54
Catches/stumpings	1/0	177/0

John Charles Clay (18 March 1898 – 11 August 1973) was a Welsh cricketer who played first-class cricket for Glamorgan from 1921 to 1949. He also played one Test match for England in 1935.

== Personal life and war service ==
Clay was born in Bonvilston, Glamorgan, the son of Charles and Margaret Clay. His father had a shipping business in Cardiff. John attended Winchester College from 1911 to 1916. He served in France in the First World War as a second lieutenant in the Royal Artillery.

He married Gwenllian Mary Homfray (1905–2004) at Cowbridge in 1928, and they had three sons. In the Second World War he served as a major in the Territorial Army.

Clay died at St Hilary, near Cowbridge, in 1973.

== Cricket career ==
At Winchester College, Clay bowled mostly fast but occasionally leg-spin. He first played for Glamorgan as a fast bowler in 1920, the year before they achieved first-class status, but switched to off-spin after some back trouble. He played for the club till 1949, as captain from 1924 to 1927 and then again in 1929 and 1946, when they finished sixth, their best position to that time, and at the age of 48 he took 120 wickets at an average of 12.72. Between 1933 and 1938, he served as the club's treasurer and with the captain, Maurice Turnbull, helped raise money through functions and contacts that kept the club afloat.

In 1935 Clay was called up to play a Test match for England at the Oval against South Africa, but did not take a wicket and did not bat. 1937 was his most successful as a bowler, taking 176 wickets, which remains a Glamorgan record; against Worcestershire at Swansea he took 17 wickets in the match. At the age of 50 he was a key player in Glamorgan's first County Championship title in 1948, taking 19 wickets for 145 runs in the two consecutive innings victories in August that clinched the title.

Clay took nine wickets in an innings three times. His best figures were 9 for 54 in the first innings against Northamptonshire in 1935; he also took 6 for 32 in the second innings. He was a useful lower-order batsman who hit two centuries, with a highest of 115 not out against the New Zealanders in 1927. In 1929 he made his only Championship hundred against Worcestershire at Swansea, batting at number 10; his stand of 203 with Joe Hills for the ninth wicket is still the club record.

John Arlott thought Clay was the best off-spin bowler in England: "Some others, perhaps, spun the ball harder – though not markedly so – but no-one until Laker of a later generation combined his degree of spin and such accuracy, subtlety, and variety of flight."

== After cricket ==
Clay was a Test selector in 1947 and 1948. He contributed an annual essay to the Glamorgan County Cricket Club Yearbook from 1933 to 1950. On the basis of these essays, John Arlott declared that Clay was his favourite cricket writer. He served as President of Glamorgan from 1961 until his death in 1973. He died at St Hilary, near Cowbridge, Glamorgan.

Outside cricket Clay had various business interests which often prevented him from playing cricket, which he always played as an amateur. He was a fan of horse-racing and was the owner of several long-distance steeplechasers. He served as secretary of the Glamorgan Hunt, and steward and director of Chepstow Racecourse, which had been laid out in the grounds of his family home at Piercefield Park in the 1920s. A long-distance steeplechase is held there annually in his memory.
