= Harry Creber =

English cricketer

Personal information
- Born: 30 April 1872; Birkenhead, Cheshire, England
- Died: 27 March 1939 (aged 66); Uplands, Swansea, Glamorgan, Wales
- Batting: Right-handed
- Bowling: Left-arm medium
- Relatives: Arthur Creber (son)

Domestic team information
- Years: Team
- 1921–1922: Glamorgan

Career statistics
Competition	FC
Matches	34
Runs scored	157
Batting average	5.06
100s/50s	0/0
Top score	13*
Balls bowled	5,613
Wickets	98
Bowling average	27.25
5 wickets in innings	5
10 wickets in match	1
Best bowling	7/47
Catches/stumpings	5/–
- Source: Cricinfo, 7 December 2025

Harry Creber (30 April 1872 – 27 March 1939) was an English cricketer active from 1898 to 1922 who played for Glamorgan. He was born in Birkenhead and died in Swansea. He appeared in 34 first-class matches as a left-arm medium-pace bowler and tail-end right-handed batsman. He scored 157 runs with a highest score of 13* and took 98 wickets with a best performance of seven for 47.
