= List of cricket grounds in England and Wales =

This is a list of cricket grounds in England and Wales, listed in alphabetical order and based on each traditional English and Welsh county. The venues in this list have all been used for first-class matches. The venues have all staged first-class (from 1772), limited overs (from 1963) or Twenty20 (from 2003) matches. Venues used only for junior or minor matches are excluded. Some of the venues are dated to the 17th and 18th centuries and many are now defunct (marked by †).

Locations of all stadiums which have hosted a men's international cricket match within England and Wales

== International grounds ==
- For a full list of grounds in England and Wales that have held men's international cricket, see List of international men's cricket grounds in England and Wales

Grounds that have held women's international cricket (test matches, one day internationals and Twenty20 internationals) and that are not included on the list of grounds that have held men's international cricket include:

Official name (known as)	City or town	Dates span	Ends/notes	Ref
Stanley Park	Blackpool	1937, 1986, 2007		
Valentine's Park	Ilford, Essex	1973	Women's World Cup 1973	
Danescourt	Wolverhampton	1973	Women's World Cup 1973	
Dean Park	Bournemouth	1973	Women's World Cup 1973	
London Road	Tring, Hertfordshire	1973	Women's World Cup 1973	
Clarence Park	St Albans, Hertfordshire	1973	Women's World Cup 1973	
Corfton Road	Ealing	1973, 1993	Women's World Cup 1973, 1993	
The Grove	Sittingbourne, Kent	1973	Women's World Cup 1973	
Queen's Park	Chesterfield, Derbyshire	1973, 2011	Women's World Cup 1973	
Hesketh Park	Dartford, Kent	1973	Women's World Cup 1973	
Park Avenue	Bradford	1973	Women's World Cup 1973	
The Saffrons	Eastbourne, Sussex	1973	Women's World Cup 1973	
Manor Fields	Bletchley, Northamptonshire	1973	Women's World Cup 1973	
Clifton Park	York	1973	Women's World Cup 1973	
The Maer Ground	Exmouth	1973	Women's World Cup 1973	
Leicester Ivanhoe Cricket Club Ground	Kirby Muxloe, Leicestershire	1973, 1990	Women's World Cup 1973	
Fenners	Cambridge	1973	Women's World Cup 1973	
Aigburth	Liverpool	1973	Women's World Cup 1973	
Lensbury Sports Ground	Teddington, Middlesex	1979		
Steetley Company Ground	Shireoaks, Nottinghamshire	1979		
Central Recreation Ground†	Hastings, Sussex	1984		
Recreation Ground	Banstead, Surrey	1986, 1993	Women's World Cup 1993	
Thornbury Avenue	Osterley, Middlesex	1986		
Harewood Park	Collingham, Yorkshire	1986, 1987, 1993	Women's World Cup 1993	
Woodbridge Road	Guildford	1987, 1993, 1996, 1998		
Lewin Road	Great Oakley, Northamptonshire	1990		
John Player Ground†	Nottingham	1990, 1993	Women's World Cup 1993	
Aylestone Road	Leicester	1990		
Civil Service Sports Ground	Chiswick	1993	Women's World Cup 1993	
Pixham Lane	Dorking, Surrey	1993	Women's World Cup 1993	
Denis Compton Oval	Shenley, Hertfordshire	1993, 1999, 2001, 2002, 2003, 2006, 2007, 2008	Women's World Cup 1993	
Arundel Castle Cricket Club Ground	Arundel, Sussex	1993, 2006, 2008, 2012	Women's World Cup 1993	
Finchampstead Park	Finchampstead, Berkshire	1993	Women's World Cup 1993	
Sonning Lane	Reading	1993	Women's World Cup 1993	
The Kent County Cricket Ground	Beckenham, Kent	1993	Women's World Cup 1993	
Bank of England Ground	Roehampton, Surrey	1993	Women's World Cup 1993	
Walton Lea Road	Warrington, Cheshire	1993	Women's World Cup 1993	
The Nevill Ground	Tunbridge Wells, Kent	1993	Women's World Cup 1993	
Christ Church Ground	Oxford	1993	Women's World Cup 1993	
Willow Lane	Meir Heath, Staffordshire	1993	Women's World Cup 1993	
Wellington College	Crowthorne, Berkshire	1993, 2008	Women's World Cup 1993	
Lindfield Common	Lindfield, Sussex	1993	Women's World Cup 1993	
Midland Bank Sports Ground	Beckenham, Kent	1993	Women's World Cup 1993	
Wilton Park	Beaconsfield, Buckinghamshire	1993, 2002	Women's World Cup 1993	
Honor Oak Cricket Club Ground	Dulwich Common, Surrey	1993	Women's World Cup 1993	
Pound Lane	Marlow, Buckinghamshire	1993	Women's World Cup 1993	
Chalvey Road†	Slough, Buckinghamshire	1993	Women's World Cup 1993	
Leicester Road	Hinckley, Leicestershire	1997		
St George's Road	Harrogate	1998		
Campbell Park	Milton Keynes	1998		
Bradfield College	Reading	2001		
The Racecourse	Durham	2002		
Sir Paul Getty's Ground	Wormsley, Buckinghamshire	2009, 2011, 2012, 2013, 2014		
Swans Nest Lane	Stratford-upon-Avon, Warwickshire	2005, 2009		
Chester Road North	Kidderminster, Worcestershire	2005		
College Ground	Cheltenham, Gloucestershire	2005		
North Parade	Bath	2007, 2008		
Haslegrave Ground	Loughborough, Leicestershire	2008, 2012, 2013		
Shaw Lane	Barnsley, Yorkshire	2010		
Boscawen Park	Truro, Cornwall	2012		
London Road	Louth, Lincolnshire	2013		

== Domestic grounds in England ==
=== Bedfordshire ===
- For a full list of grounds that Bedfordshire County Cricket Club have used as home grounds in List A, Minor Counties Championship or MCCA Knockout Trophy cricket, see List of Bedfordshire County Cricket Club grounds

=== Berkshire ===
- For a full list of grounds that Berkshire County Cricket Club have used as home grounds in List A, Minor Counties Championship or MCCA Knockout Trophy cricket, see List of Berkshire County Cricket Club grounds

Official name (known as)	City or town	County team/use span	Ends/notes	Ref
Old Field†	Bray	Berkshire (1782–1794)		

=== Buckinghamshire ===
- For a full list of grounds that Buckinghamshire County Cricket Club have used as home grounds in List A, Minor Counties Championship or MCCA Knockout Trophy cricket, see List of Buckinghamshire County Cricket Club grounds

=== Cambridgeshire ===
- For a full list of grounds that Cambridgeshire County Cricket Club have used as home grounds in List A, Minor Counties Championship or MCCA Knockout Trophy cricket, see List of Cambridgeshire County Cricket Club grounds
- For a full list of grounds that Cambridge University Cricket Club have used as home grounds in first-class and List A cricket, see List of Cambridge University Cricket Club grounds

=== Cheshire ===
- For a full list of grounds that Cheshire County Cricket Club have used as home grounds in List A, Minor Counties Championship or MCCA Knockout Trophy cricket, see List of Cheshire County Cricket Club grounds

=== Cornwall ===
- For a full list of grounds that Cornwall County Cricket Club have used as home grounds in List A, Minor Counties Championship or MCCA Knockout Trophy cricket, see List of Cornwall County Cricket Club grounds

=== Cumberland ===
- For a full list of grounds that Cumberland County Cricket Club have used as home grounds in List A, Minor Counties Championship or MCCA Knockout Trophy cricket, see List of Cumberland County Cricket Club grounds

=== Derbyshire ===
- For a full list of grounds that Derbyshire County Cricket Club have used as home grounds in first-class, List A or Twenty20 cricket, see List of Derbyshire County Cricket Club grounds

=== Devon ===
- For a full list of grounds that Devon County Cricket Club have used as home grounds in List A, Minor Counties Championship or MCCA Knockout Trophy cricket, see List of Devon County Cricket Club grounds

=== Dorset ===
- For a full list of grounds that Dorset County Cricket Club have used as home grounds in List A, Minor Counties Championship or MCCA Knockout Trophy cricket, see List of Dorset County Cricket Club grounds

=== Durham ===
- For a full list of grounds that Durham County Cricket Club have used as home grounds in Minor Counties Championship, MCCA Knockout Trophy, first-class, List A or Twenty20 cricket, see List of Durham County Cricket Club grounds

Official name (known as)	City or town	County team/use span	Ends/notes	Ref
Portrack Lane†	Stockton-on-Tees	Yorkshire and Durham (1858); Yorkshire with Stockton-on-Tees (1861)		
The Racecourse	Durham	Durham University Cricket Club (from 1843)	Hosted first class DUCC matches 2001–2011; also used by DCCC 1992–1994 and the MCC 2007–2008	

=== Essex ===
- For a full list of grounds that Essex County Cricket Club have used as home grounds in first-class, List A or Twenty20 cricket, see List of Essex County Cricket Club grounds

Official name (known as)	City or town	County team/use span	Ends/notes	Ref
Langton Park†	Hornchurch	Hornchurch Cricket Club (1787–1793); Essex (1792)		
The Green Man†	Navestock	R. Newman's XI (1793)		tbc
Toby Howe Cricket Ground	Billericay	Essex Cricket Board (2000)		

=== Gloucestershire ===
- For a full list of grounds that Gloucestershire County Cricket Club have used as home grounds in first-class, List A or Twenty20 cricket, see List of Gloucestershire County Cricket Club grounds

Official name (known as)	City or town	County team/use span	Ends/notes	Ref
Hatherley and Reddings Cricket Club Ground	Cheltenham	Gloucestershire Cricket Board (1999)		

=== Hampshire ===
- For a full list of grounds that Hampshire County Cricket Club have used as home grounds in first-class, List A or Twenty20 cricket, see List of Hampshire County Cricket Club grounds
- For a full list of grounds that Hampshire Cricket Board have used as home grounds in List A and MCCA Knockout Trophy cricket, see List of Hampshire Cricket Board grounds
- For a full list of grounds that Hampshire county cricket team (pre-1864) used as home grounds in first-class cricket prior to the formation of Hampshire County Cricket Club, see List of Hampshire county cricket team (pre-1864) grounds

=== Herefordshire ===
- For a full list of grounds that Herefordshire County Cricket Club have used as home grounds in List A, Minor Counties Championship or MCCA Knockout Trophy cricket, see List of Herefordshire County Cricket Club grounds

=== Hertfordshire ===
- For a full list of grounds that Hertfordshire County Cricket Club have used as home grounds in List A, Minor Counties Championship or MCCA Knockout Trophy cricket, see List of Hertfordshire County Cricket Club grounds

=== Huntingdonshire ===
- For a full list of grounds that Huntingdonshire County Cricket Club have used as home grounds in List A and MCCA Knockout Trophy cricket, see List of Huntingdonshire County Cricket Club grounds

=== Isle of Wight ===
- For a full list of grounds that Hampshire County Cricket Club have used as home grounds in first-class cricket that have been based on the Isle of Wight, see List of Hampshire County Cricket Club grounds

=== Kent ===
- For a full list of grounds that Kent County Cricket Club have used as home grounds in first-class, List A or Twenty20 cricket, see List of Kent County Cricket Club grounds

Official name (known as)	City or town	County team/use span	Ends/notes	Ref
Bishopsbourne Paddock†	Bishopsbourne	Kent and Sir Horatio Mann's XI (1766–1790)		
Bowman's Lodge†	Dartford	Kent (1806)		
West Kent Cricket Ground	Chislehurst	Kent (1822–1836); Gentlemen of Kent (1832–1838)		
Cobham Park†	Cobham	Kent (1792)		
Coxheath Common (including the ground at the Star Inn)†	Coxheath	Kent and Sir Horatio Mann's XI (1728–1789)		
Dandelion Paddock†	Margate	Sir Horatio Mann's XI (1795); England (1796)		
Dartford Brent†	Dartford	Dartford and Kent (1709–1795)		
Hawkhurst Moor†	Hawkhurst	Kent (1825–1826)		
Napps†	Wrotham	Kent (1815)		
Penenden Heath†	Maidstone	Kent (1795)		
Phillip's Field†	Bromley	Kent (1840)		
Vine Cricket Ground (Sevenoaks Vine)	Sevenoaks	Kent (1773–1786 and 1827–1829)		

=== Lancashire ===
- For a full list of grounds that Lancashire County Cricket Club have used as home grounds in first-class, List A or Twenty20 cricket, see List of Lancashire County Cricket Club grounds

Official name (known as)	City or town	County team/use span	Ends/notes	Ref
Ashton Club Ground†	Ashton-under-Lyne	Cambridgeshire/Yorkshire (1865)		
Botanical Gardens†	Manchester	Manchester (1848–1854); Lancashire (1849–1851)		
Broughton Cricket Club Ground†	Salford	North (1856 & 1859–1863); Gentlemen of the North (1858–1860)		
GP Codie's Ground†	Eccles	Manchester (1857–1858)		
Merefield Ground†	Rochdale	North (1860)		
Milnrow Road†	Rochdale	North (1876)		
Moss Lane†	Manchester	Manchester (1844–1846)		

=== Leicestershire ===
- For a full list of grounds that Leicestershire County Cricket Club have used as home grounds in first-class, List A or Twenty20 cricket, see List of Leicestershire County Cricket Club grounds

Official name (known as)	City or town	County team/use span	Ends/notes	Ref
Barker's Ground†	Leicester	North (1836–1846); Midland Counties (1843)		
Ratcliffe College	Cossington	Leicestershire Cricket Board (2002)		
Tyler's Ground†	Loughborough	North (1875)		
Haslegrave Ground	Loughborough	Loughborough University (from 1983); Loughborough Lightning (2016–2019); The Blaze (from 2019)	Single first-class match in 2011; multiple List A and Twenty20 matches	

=== Lincolnshire ===
- For a full list of grounds that Lincolnshire County Cricket Club have used as home grounds in List A, Minor Counties Championship or MCCA Knockout Trophy cricket, see List of Lincolnshire County Cricket Club grounds

=== Middlesex ===
- For a full list of grounds that Middlesex County Cricket Club have used as home grounds in first-class, List A or Twenty20 cricket, see List of Middlesex County Cricket Club grounds

Official name (known as)	City or town	County team/use span	Ends/notes	Ref
Artillery Ground	Finsbury	London (1730–1778)		tbc
Lord's Middle Ground†	St John's Wood	B. Aislabie's XI (1811); Lord Frederick Beauclerk's XI (1812–1813)		tbc
Lord's Old Ground†	Marylebone	Middlesex (1787–1796); Marylebone Cricket Club (MCC; 1789–1809)		tbc
Orleans Club Ground†	Twickenham	Orleans Club (1878–1883)		
Royal Air Force Sports Ground	Uxbridge	Combined Services (1964)		
W. Fennex's New Ground†	Uxbridge	Middlesex (1789–90)		tbc
Wembley Park†	Wembley	Wembley Park Cricket Club (1896)		
White Conduit Fields†	Islington	London (1718–73); White Conduit Club (1784–86)		

=== Norfolk ===
- For a full list of grounds that Norfolk County Cricket Club have used as home grounds in List A, Minor Counties Championship or MCCA Knockout Trophy cricket, see List of Norfolk County Cricket Club grounds

Official name (known as)	City or town	County team/use span	Ends/notes	Ref
New Ground†	Norwich	Norfolk (1834–1836)		tbc
Old Buckenham Hall	Attleborough	L. Robinson's XI (1912–1921)		
Racecourse Ground†	Swaffham	Earl of Winchilsea's XI (1797)		

=== Northamptonshire ===
- For a full list of grounds that Northamptonshire County Cricket Club have used as home grounds in Minor Counties Championship, first-class, List A or Twenty20 cricket, see List of Northamptonshire County Cricket Club grounds

Official name (known as)	City or town	County team/use span	Ends/notes	Ref
Hatton Park†	Wellingborough	United North of England Eleven (1874)		
Racecourse Ground Promenade†	Northampton	United North of England Eleven (1872)		

=== Northumberland ===
- For a full list of grounds that Northumberland County Cricket Club have used as home grounds in List A, Minor Counties Championship or MCCA Knockout Trophy cricket, see List of Northumberland County Cricket Club grounds

=== Nottinghamshire ===
- For a full list of grounds that Nottinghamshire County Cricket Club have used as home grounds in first-class, List A or Twenty20 cricket, see List of Nottinghamshire County Cricket Club grounds

Official name (known as)	City or town	County team/use span	Ends/notes	Ref
Brackenhurst Cricket Ground	Southwell	Gentlemen of Southwell (1846)		
Forest New Ground†	Nottingham	Nottingham (1771–1837)		
King's Meadow†	Nottingham	Nottingham (1791)		
Meadow Road†	Beeston	Gentlemen of the North (1870)		
West Park	West Bridgford	Sir Julien Cahn's XI (1932–1935)		

=== Oxfordshire ===
- For a full list of grounds that Oxfordshire County Cricket Club have used as home grounds in List A, Minor Counties Championship or MCCA Knockout Trophy cricket, see List of Oxfordshire County Cricket Club grounds

Official name (known as)	City or town	County team/use span	Ends/notes	Ref
Magdalen Ground†	Oxford	Oxford University Cricket Club (1829–1880, 1912)	Built over in the 1920s	
Bullingdon Green†	Oxford	Oxford University Cricket Club (1843)	Used due to flooding at the Magdalen Ground. Cowley Barracks built on the site in 1876.	
Christ Church Ground	Oxford	Oxford University Cricket Club (1878–1961)	Also used by Oxfordshire for list A matches 1981–2001	
University Parks	Oxford	Oxford University Cricket Club (from 1881); Oxford UCCE/MCCU (combined Oxford University and Oxford Brookes University team) (from 2001)	Last first-class match 2019. Also used by the MCC in 2000	
New College Ground	Oxford	Oxford University Cricket Club (1906, 1907, 1927)		

=== Rutland ===
- For a full list of grounds that Leicestershire County Cricket Club have used as home grounds in first-class and List A cricket that have been based in Rutland, see List of Leicestershire County Cricket Club grounds

Official name (known as)	City or town	County team/use span	Ends/notes	Ref
The Park†	Burley-on-the-Hill	England (1790–1793); Old Etonians (1791); Earl of Winchilsea's XI (1792–1793)		tbc

=== Shropshire ===
- For a full list of grounds that Shropshire County Cricket Club have used as home grounds in List A, Minor Counties Championship or MCCA Knockout Trophy cricket, see List of Shropshire County Cricket Club grounds

=== Somerset ===
- For a full list of grounds that Somerset County Cricket Club have used as home grounds in first-class, List A or Twenty20 cricket, see List of Somerset County Cricket Club grounds
- For a full list of grounds that Somerset Cricket Board have used as home grounds in List A and MCCA Knockout Trophy cricket, see List of Somerset Cricket Board grounds

=== Staffordshire ===
- For a full list of grounds that Staffordshire County Cricket Club have used as home grounds in List A, Minor Counties Championship or MCCA Knockout Trophy cricket, see List of Staffordshire County Cricket Club grounds

Official name (known as)	City or town	County team/use span	Ends/notes	Ref
Burton-on-Trent Cricket Ground†	Burton-on-Trent	North (1840–1841)		

=== Suffolk ===
- For a full list of grounds that Suffolk County Cricket Club have used as home grounds in List A, Minor Counties Championship or MCCA Knockout Trophy cricket, see List of Suffolk County Cricket Club grounds

=== Surrey ===
- For a full list of grounds that Surrey County Cricket Club have used as home grounds in first-class, List A or Twenty20 cricket, see List of Surrey County Cricket Club grounds

Official name (known as)	City or town	County team/use span	Ends/notes	Ref
Aram's New Ground†	Walworth	Surrey and Middlesex (1797); Lord Frederick Beauclerk's XI (1802)		tbc
Cheam Cricket Club Ground	Cheam	Surrey Cricket Board (1999–2001)		
Epsom Down†	Epsom	Epsom (1816–1819)		tbc
Guildford Bason†	Guildford	Surrey (1774)		tbc
Holt Pound†	Wrecclesham	Surrey (1791–1809)		tbc
J. W. Hobbs' Ground† (Barclays Bank Ground)	Norbury	C. I. Thornton's XI (1888)		
Kew Green	Kew	London (1730–32)		
Laleham Burway†	near Chertsey	Surrey (1773–1779); Chertsey (1778)		tbc
Moulsey Hurst†	West Molesey	Surrey (1723–1806)		
Royal Military Academy Ground	near Camberley	Army (1938)		
St Ann's Ground†	Barnes	Lyric Club (1890)		
The Burys†	Godalming	Godalming (1821–1825); Surrey (1828–1830)		tbc
Wimbledon Cricket Club Ground	Wimbledon	Surrey Cricket Board (1999)		

=== Sussex ===
- For a full list of grounds that Sussex County Cricket Club have used as home grounds in first-class, List A or Twenty20 cricket, see List of Sussex County Cricket Club grounds

Official name (known as)	City or town	County team/use span	Ends/notes	Ref
Manor Ground†	Bexhill-on-Sea	Earl de la Warr's XI (1896)		
Midhurst Cricket Ground†	Midhurst	Sussex (1830)		tbc
Petworth Park†	Petworth	Sussex (1824–1826)		tbc
Prince of Wales Ground†	Brighton	Brighton (1791–1792)		tbc
Sheffield Park	near Uckfield	Lord Sheffield's XI (1881–1896)		
The Dripping Pan	Lewes	2nd Duke of Richmond's XI (1728–1730)		

=== Warwickshire ===
- For a full list of grounds that Warwickshire County Cricket Club have used as home grounds in first-class, List A or Twenty20 cricket, see List of Warwickshire County Cricket Club grounds

Official name (known as)	City or town	County team/use span	Ends/notes	Ref
Aston Park†	Birmingham	North (1861)		
Parr and Wisden's Ground†	Leamington Spa	North (1849–1850)		

=== Westmorland ===
- For a full list of grounds that Cumberland County Cricket Club have used as home grounds in List A, Minor Counties Championship or MCCA Knockout Trophy cricket that have been based in Westmorland, see List of Cumberland County Cricket Club grounds

=== Wiltshire ===
- For a full list of grounds that Wiltshire County Cricket Club have used as home grounds in List A, Minor Counties Championship or MCCA Knockout Trophy cricket, see List of Wiltshire County Cricket Club grounds

Official name (known as)	City or town	County team/use span	Ends/notes	Ref
Perriam Down†	Ludgershall	T. A. Smith's XI (1787–96); Hampshire (1788–1792); Hampshire and Surrey (1790)		tbc

=== Worcestershire ===
- For a full list of grounds that Worcestershire County Cricket Club have used as home grounds in Minor Counties Championship, first-class, List A or Twenty20 cricket, see List of Worcestershire County Cricket Club grounds

=== Yorkshire ===
- For a full list of grounds that Yorkshire County Cricket Club have used as home grounds in first-class, List A or Twenty20 cricket, see List of Yorkshire County Cricket Club grounds

Official name (known as)	City or town	County team/use span	Ends/notes	Ref
Army Ground†	Catterick Garrison	Combined Services (1954)		
Centre Vale	Todmorden	United North of England Eleven (1874)		
Darnall New Ground†	Sheffield	Sheffield and Leicester (1826); Yorkshire/Nottinghamshire/Leicestershire (1828); Sheffield (1828–1829)		tbc
Ferham Park†	Rotherham	North (1880)		
Hyde Park Ground†	Sheffield	Sheffield (1830–1852); Yorkshire (1833–1853)		tbc
Mount Pleasant	Batley	T. Emmett's XI (1883)		

† = Defunct venue

== Domestic grounds in Wales ==
=== Glamorgan ===
- For the SWALEC Stadium, see Test grounds
- For a full list of grounds that Glamorgan County Cricket Club have used as home grounds in Minor Counties Championship, first-class, List A or Twenty20 cricket, see List of Glamorgan County Cricket Club grounds
- For grounds in Glamorgan used solely by Wales Minor Counties Cricket Club (Pontarddulais Park and Sully Centurions Cricket Club Ground) as home grounds in List A, Minor Counties Championship, or MCCA Knockout Trophy cricket, see List of Wales Minor Counties Cricket Club grounds

=== Other Welsh counties ===
- For grounds in the historic Welsh counties of Breconshire, Caernarvonshire, Cardiganshire, Carmarthenshire, Denbighshire, Flintshire, Monmouthshire, Pembrokeshire that have been used in first-class List A, Twenty20, Minor Counties Championship or MCCA Knockout Trophy matches, see List of Glamorgan County Cricket Club grounds and List of Wales Minor Counties Cricket Club grounds

== See also ==
- First known use of English cricket venues (1610–1825)
- List of British stadiums by capacity
- List of Test cricket grounds
- List of cricket grounds by capacity

== Bibliography ==
- Buckley, G. B. (1935). Fresh Light on 18th Century Cricket. Cotterell.
- Buckley, G. B. (1937). Fresh Light on pre-Victorian Cricket. Cotterell.
- Haygarth, Arthur (1862). Scores & Biographies, Volume 1 (1744–1826). Lillywhite. ISBN 1-900592-23-1.
- McCann, Tim (2004). Sussex Cricket in the Eighteenth Century. Sussex Record Society.
- Maun, Ian (2009). From Commons to Lord's, Volume One: 1700 to 1750. Roger Heavens. ISBN 978-1-900592-52-9.
- Milton, Howard (1979). Kent cricket grounds, in The Cricket Statistician, no.28, December 1979, pp. 2–10.
- Milton, Howard (2020). Kent County Cricket Grounds. Woking: Pitch Publishing. ISBN 978-1-78531-661-6
- Waghorn, H. T. (1899). Cricket Scores, Notes, etc. (1730–1773). Blackwood.
- Waghorn, H. T. (1906). The Dawn of Cricket. Electric Press.
