= List of Cambridgeshire County Cricket Club grounds =

Cambridgeshire County Cricket Club was established on 6 June 1891; prior to that a county club had existed before, and had occasionally appeared in first-class cricket. It has since played minor counties cricket from 1895 and played List A cricket from 1964 to 2004, using a different number of home grounds during that time. Their first home minor counties fixture in 1895 was against Norfolk at Fenner's, Cambridge, while their first home List A match came 69 years later, against Essex in the 1964 Gillette Cup at Spicer's Sports Ground, Sawston.

The 21 grounds that Cambridgeshire have used for home matches since 1895 are listed below, with statistics complete through to the end of the 2014 season.

== Grounds ==
=== List A ===
Below is a complete list of grounds used by Cambridgeshire County Cricket Club when it was permitted to play List A matches. These grounds have also held Minor Counties Championship and MCCA Knockout Trophy matches.

Name	Location	First	Last	Matches	First	Last	Matches	First	Last	Matches	Refs
Name	Location	List A			Minor Counties Championship			MCCA Trophy			Refs
Fenner's	Cambridge	only match: 5 July 1972 v Buckinghamshire		1	28 August 1895 v Norfolk	3 August 2008 v Northumberland	203	7 August 1983 v Dorset	5 June 1988 v Norfolk	4	(Note: Cambridge University have played first-class cricket matches here since 1848. Cambridge University and Combined Universities/British Universities have played List A matches here in the Benson & Hedges Cup from 1972–1997. Only the List A match played by Cambridgeshire at the ground is recorded in the table. The final of the MCCA Knockout Trophy has been played here twice, in 1984 and 1985, with both matches not involving Cambridgeshire. Only the MCCA Knockout Trophy matches played by Cambridgeshire at the ground are recorded in the table.)
Harecroft Road	Wisbech	3 May 1967 v Oxfordshire	24 June 1997 v Hampshire	4	2 August 1926 v Leicestershire Second XI	6 July 2014 v Lincolnshire	62	11 June 2000 v Norfolk	21 April 2013 v Cumberland	6	(Note: One first-class match has been played here when the East of England played the touring New Zealanders in 1927.)
The Avenue Sports Club Ground	March	25 June 1975 v Northamptonshire	7 May 2003 v Yorkshire	10	4 May 1939 v Suffolk	3 August 2013 v Northumberland	78	1 June 1997 v Cheshire	25 May 2014 v Bedfordshire	16	
Spicer's Sports Ground	Sawston	only match: 30 April 1964 v Essex		1	13 August 1951 v Hertfordshire	9 August 1967 v Hertfordshire	16	–	–	0	

=== Minor Counties ===
Below is a complete list of grounds used by Cambridgeshire County Cricket Club in Minor Counties Championship and MCCA Knockout Trophy matches.

Name	Location	First	Last	Matches	First	Last	Matches	Refs
Name	Location	Minor Counties Championship			MCCA Trophy			Refs
R. Cotton's Ground	Newmarket	7 August 1908 v Suffolk	27 July 1911 v Suffolk	4	–	–	0	(Note: One first-class match was played here in 1864 between Cambridgeshire and Yorkshire and Kent and Nottinghamshire.)
Paradise Sports Ground	Ely	21 July 1909 v Lincolnshire	5 June 1966 v Bedfordshire	17	–	–	0	
Parker's Piece	Cambridge	20 July 1914 v Suffolk	27 July 1927 v Hertfordshire	4	–	–	0	(Note: First-class cricket was played here by various Cambridge based teams from 1817–1864.)
Recreation Ground	Histon	13 August 1926 v Bedfordshire	9 June 1954 v Lincolnshire	6	–	–	0	
Magdalene College Ground	Cambridge	only match: 7 August 1929 v Hertfordshire		1	–	–	0	
St John's College Ground	Cambridge	12 August 1929 v Oxfordshire	20 August 1936 v Bedfordshire	5	–	–	0	
Trinity College Old Field	Cambridge	19 August 1929 v Bedfordshire	2 July 1969 v Norfolk	4	only match: 25 May 1986 v Norfolk		1	
Christs College Ground	Cambridge	10 July 1957 v Lincolnshire	30 July 1958 v Hertfordshire	2	–	–	0	
Chatteris Cricket Ground	Chatteris	21 June 1967 v Lincolnshire	9 June 1971 v Bedfordshire	4	–	–	0	(Note: Cambridge Town Club and the Marylebone Cricket Club played a first-class match at Chatteris in 1832. It is not known if this match was played on the present ground.)
The Manor Grounds	Whittlesey	14 August 1968 v Shropshire	5 August 1970 v Hertfordshire	2	–	–	0	
Papworth Cricket Club Ground	Papworth Everard	11 June 1975 v Norfolk	8 July 1981 v Lincolnshire	7	–	–	0	(Note: Huntingdonshire played a single MCCA Knockout Trophy match here against Suffolk in 2001.)
Royston Heath	Royston	30 June 1982 v Lincolnshire	26 July 1983 v Bedfordshire	2	–	–	0	
Bretton Gate	Peterborough	10 August 1983 v Durham	19 July 1994 v Cumberland	6	–	–	0	(Note: Huntingdonshire played a single MCCA Knockout Trophy match here against Lincolnshire in 2002.)
Anglo-American Playing Fields	Saffron Walden	30 August 1995 v Bedfordshire	17 August 2014 v Staffordshire	9	30 June 1996 v Buckinghamshire	13 May 2012 v Cheshire	2	(Note: Anglo-American Playing Fields are based in the adjacent county of Essex. The Essex Second XI played one Minor Counties Championship here in 1954. Only the Minor Counties Championship matches played by Cambridgeshire at the ground are recorded in the table. The Essex Cricket Board played two MCCA Knockout Trophy matches here in 1999 and 2000. Only the MCCA Knockout Trophy matches played by Cambridgeshire at the ground are recorded in the table.)
The Leys School Ground	Cambridge	–	–	0	3 June 1990 v Suffolk	19 May 2013 v Northumberland	6	
Kimbolton School Ground	Kimbolton	only match: 24 July 1996 v Buckinghamshire		1	–	–	0	(Note: Huntingdonshire played five MCCA Knockout Trophy matches between 1998–2002.)
Clare College Sports Ground	Cambridge	–	–	0	3 May 2009 v Buckinghamshire	4 May 2014 v Suffolk	4	
