= List of Worcestershire County Cricket Club grounds =

Worcestershire County Cricket Club was established on 4 March 1865. The county entered the Minor Counties Championship in 1895 and competed in the competition until 1898, after which it was elevated to first-class status for the 1899 season. It has since played first-class cricket from 1899, List A cricket from 1963 and Twenty20 cricket from 2003, using a different number of home grounds during that time. New Road in Worcester has played host to the club's first home fixtures in all three formats of the game; in first-class cricket in 1899 against Yorkshire; in List A cricket in 1963 against Surrey; and in Twenty20 cricket against Northamptonshire in 2003. Worcestershire have played home matches at twelve grounds, but have played the majority of their home fixtures at New Road, which has also held One Day Internationals.

The twelve grounds that Worcestershire have used for home matches since 1895 are listed below, with statistics complete through to the end of the 2014 season.

== Grounds ==
=== Minor county ===
Below is a complete list of grounds used by Worcestershire County Cricket Club in Minor Counties Championship matches before its elevation to first-class status in 1899.

Name	Location	First	Last	Matches	Refs
Name	Location	Minor Counties Championship			Refs
War Memorial Athletic Ground	Amblecote	5 August 1895 v Staffordshire	18 June 1896 v Northamptonshire	2	
Malvern College Ground	Malvern	only match: 9 August 1895 v Hertfordshire		1	
Boughton Park	Worcester	19 August 1895 v Cheshire	12 August 1896 v Norfolk	3	
Chester Road North	Kidderminster	28 August 1895 v Durham	23 August 1897 v Glamorgan	3	
New Road	Worcester	28 July 1897 v Berkshire	8 August 1898 v Buckinghamshire	8	

=== First-class county ===
Below is a complete list of grounds used by Worcestershire County Cricket Club in first-class, List A and Twenty20 matches following its elevation to first-class status in 1899.

Name	Location	First	Last	Matches	First	Last	Matches	First	Last	Matches	Refs
Name	Location	First-class			List A			Twenty20			Refs
New Road	Worcester	4 May 1899 v Yorkshire	9 September 2014 v Surrey	1,112	22 May 1963 v Surrey	13 August 2014 v Gloucestershire	451	13 June 2003 v Northamptonshire	25 July 2014 v Derbyshire	50	(Note: Only the first-class, List A and Twenty20 matches played by Worcestershire at the ground are recorded in the table.)
War Memorial Athletic Ground	Amblecote	26 June 1905 v Leicestershire	29 July 1981 v Northamptonshire	61	17 August 1969 v Glamorgan	8 August 1982 v Leicestershire	3	–	–	0	
Bournville Cricket Ground	Bournville	30 June 1910 v Essex	18 May 1911 v Surrey	2	–	–	0	–	–	0	
Tipton Road	Dudley	28 August 1911 v Gloucestershire	24 July 1971 v Yorkshire	88	6 July 1969 v Kent	31 July 1977 v Nottinghamshire	14	–	–	0	
Racecourse Ground	Hereford	14 July 1919 v HK Foster's XI	13 July 1983 v Leicestershire	5	10 July 1983 v Nottinghamshire	30 August 1987 v Surrey	3	–	–	0	(Note: The Racecourse Ground is located in the adjacent county of Hereford. HK Foster's XI played a first-class match here against the Australian Imperial Forces in 1919. Only the first-class matches played by Worcestershire at the ground are recorded in the table.)
Chester Road North	Kidderminster	9 July 1921 v Glamorgan	17 September 2008 v Middlesex	68	1 June 1969 v Middlesex	7 May 2012 v Netherlands	6	29 June 2007 v Northamptonshire	1 July 2007 v Gloucestershire	2	(Note: The Worcestershire Cricket Board have played four List A matches here, while the Unicorns cricket team has played one List A match here. Only the List A matches played by Worcestershire at the ground are recorded in the table.)
Evesham Cricket Club Ground	Evesham	only match: 18 July 1951 v Gloucestershire		1	–	–	0	–	–	0	
Seth Somers Park	Halesowen	17 June 1964 v Cambridge University	21 June 1969 v Cambridge University	2	–	–	0	–	–	0	
Chain Wire Club Ground	Stourport-on-Severn	only match: 12 July 1980 v Lancashire		1	–	–	0	–	–	0	
Flagge Meadow	Worcester	–	–	0	only match: 14 July 2007 v Sri Lankan A		1	–	–	0	
