= List of Wales Minor Counties Cricket Club grounds =

Wales Minor Counties Cricket Club was established in 1988, with it joining the Minor Counties Championship in the same year as a replacement for the Somerset Second XI who had withdrawn from the Minor Counties Championship at the end of the previous season. The club has played minor counties cricket since, and played List A cricket from 1993 to 2005, using a different number of home grounds during that time. Their first home minor counties fixture in 1988 was against Shropshire at the Maes-y-Dre Recreation Ground, Welshpool, while their first home List A match came six years later against Middlesex in the 1994 NatWest Trophy at Smithy Lane, Northop Hall.

The 23 grounds that Wales Minor Counties Cricket Club have used for home matches since 1988 are listed below, with statistics complete through to the end of the 2014 season.

== Grounds ==
=== Map ===
Locations of grounds used by Wales Minor Counties

=== List A ===
Below is a complete list of grounds used by Wales Minor Counties Cricket Club when it was permitted to play List A matches. These grounds have also held Minor Counties Championship and MCCA Knockout Trophy matches.

Name	Location	First	Last	Matches	First	Last	Matches	First	Last	Matches	Refs
Name	Location	List A			Minor Counties Championship			MCCA Trophy			Refs
Smithy Lane	Northop Hall	only match: 21 June 1994 v Middlesex		1	only match: 18 August 1993 v Oxfordshire		1	17 May 1992 v Staffordshire	11 June 1995 v Cumberland	2	
Penrhyn Avenue	Colwyn Bay	only match: 24 June 1998 v Nottinghamshire		1	12 June 1988 v Shropshire	5 June 2005 v Shropshire	14	–	–	0	(Note: Glamorgan and Wales have played first-class cricket matches here. Glamorgan and the Unicorns have also played List A matches here. Only the List A match played by Wales Minor Counties at the ground are recorded in the table. Denbighshire played Minor Counties Championship matches here between 1930–1935.)
St Helen's	Swansea	23 June 1999 v Somerset	4 May 2005 v Nottinghamshire	4	21 August 1989 v Devon	26 May 2008 v Dorset	17	20 May 1990 v Oxfordshire	4 April 2004 v Berkshire	2	(Note: Glamorgan have played first-class, List A and Twenty20 matches here. Only the List A matches played by Wales Minor Counties at the ground are recorded in the table. Prior to becoming a first-class county in 1921, Glamorgan played Minor Counties Championship matches here. Only the Minor Counties Championship matches played by Wales Minor Counties at the ground are recorded in the table.)
Pontarddulais Park	Pontarddulais	only match: 2 May 2000 v Buckinghamshire		1	30 August 1992 v Devon	8 June 2014 v Shropshire	18	20 May 2001 v Herefordshire	2 May 2010 v Wiltshire	5	
Sophia Gardens	Cardiff	16 May 2000 v Buckinghamshire	29 May 2002 v Durham	2	2 August 1988 v Cheshire	8 July 2001 v Devon	2	–	–	0	(Note: Home ground of Glamorgan for first-class, List A and Twenty20 matches. Only the List A matches played by Wales Minor Counties at the ground are recorded in the table.)
Burnham Avenue	Sully	only match: 12 September 2002 v Cornwall		1	–	–	0	–	–	0	
Pen-y-Pound	Abergavenny	only match: 28 August 2003 v Denmark		1	29 July 2001 v Herefordshire	3 August 2014 v Dorset	13	9 May 1999 v Herefordshire	1 May 2011 v Cornwall	6	(Note: Glamorgan have played first-class and List A matches here. Only the List A match played by Wales Minor Counties at the ground is recorded in the table. Monmouthshire and the Glamorgan Second XI have previously Minor Counties Championship matches here. Only the Minor Counties Championship matches played by Wales Minor Counties at the ground are recorded in the table.)
Lamphey Cricket Club Ground	Lamphey	only match: 5 May 2004 v Middlesex		1	only match: 30 June 2002 v Berkshire		1	–	–	0	

=== Minor Counties ===
Below is a complete list of grounds used by Wales Minor Counties Cricket Club in Minor Counties Championship and MCCA Knockout Trophy matches.

Name	Location	First	Last	Matches	First	Last	Matches	Refs
Name	Location	Minor Counties Championship			MCCA Trophy			Refs
Maes-y-Dre Recreation Ground	Welshpool	–	–	0	only match: 22 May 1988 v Shropshire		1	
Lower Mill Street	Usk	9 August 1988 v Wiltshire	22 June 2014 v Berkshire	10	6 June 1993 v Shropshire	20 May 2014 v Devon	3	(Note: The Glamorgan Second XI played one Minor Counties Championship match here in 1949. Only the Minor Counties Championship matches played by Wales Minor Counties at the ground are recorded in the table.)
Eugene Cross Park	Ebbw Vale	16 August 1988 v Dorset	20 August 1992 v August	5	only match: 15 May 2011 v Devon		1	(Note: Glamorgan have played first-class and List A matches at the ground. Both Monmouthshire and the Glamorgan Second XI have played Minor Counties Championship matches at the ground. Only the Minor Counties Championship matches played by Wales Minor Counties at the ground are recorded in the table.)
Ammanford Park	Ammanford	only match: 6 June 1989 v Buckinghamshire		1	only match: 17 May 1998 v Warwickshire Cricket Board		1	
Recreation Ground	Penarth	24 July 1990 v Cheshire	11 August 1996 v Dorset	3	only match: 7 July 2002 v Gloucestershire Cricket Board		1	
Stradey Park	Llanelli	only match: 26 May 1991 v Oxfordshire		1	–	–	0	(Note: Glamorgan have played first-class and List A cricket at the ground. Carmarthenshire previously played Minor Counties Championship matches at the ground. Only the Minor Counties Championship match played by Wales Minor Counties at the ground are recorded in the table.)
Hoover's Sports Ground	Merthyr Tydfil	only match: 30 May 1993 v Herefordshire		1	–	–	0	(Note: Glamorgan have played two List A matches at the ground in the 1988 and 1989 Refuge Assurance League.)
Marchwiel Hall Cricket Ground	Marchwiel	17 July 1994 v Cornwall	18 June 1995 v Wiltshire	2	–	–	0	(Note: Denbighshire previously played Minor Counties Championship matches at the ground. Only the Minor Counties Championship match played by Wales Minor Counties at the ground are recorded in the table.)
Panteg House	Griffithstown	–	–	0	only match: 9 June 1996 v Cornwall		1	(Note: Monmouthshire played Minor Counties Championship matches at the ground between 1924–1932.)
Spytty Park	Newport	only match: 1 August 1999 v Herefordshire		1	7 June 1998 v Wiltshire	27 April 1914 v Cornwall	2	
Main Road	Aberdulais	only match: 6 August 2000 v Dorset		1	30 May 1999 v Worcestershire Cricket Board	25 June 2000 v Worcestershire Cricket Board	2	
Croft-y-Genau Road	St Fagans	only match: 22 August 1999 v Berkshire		1	9 July 2000 v Shropshire	27 April 2008 v Dorset	2	
Marespool	Mumbles	–	–	0	4 June 2006 v Berkshire	2 June 2013 v Berkshire	3	
Sports Complex	Tanyfron	–	–	0	only match: 6 May 2012 v Buckinghamshire		1	(Note: Denbighshire played Minor Counties Championship matches at the ground in 1930 and 1935.)
Cresselly Cricket Club Ground	Cresselly	–	–	0	only match: 5 May 2013 v Staffordshire		1	(Note: Glamorgan played a List A match here against Surrey in the 2007 Friends Provident Trophy.)
