= List of Northumberland County Cricket Club grounds =

Northumberland County Cricket Club was established in December 1895. It has since played minor counties cricket from 1896 and played List A cricket from 1971 to 2005, using a different number of home grounds during that time. Their first home minor counties fixture in 1896 was against Staffordshire at Northumberland Club Ground, Heaton, while their first List A match came 75 years later against Lincolnshire in the 1971 Gillette Cup at Osborne Avenue, Jesmond. During the time Northumberland were permitted to play List A cricket, Osborne Avenue played host to all its home fixtures in that format.

The eight grounds that Northumberland have used for home matches since 1896 are listed below, with statistics complete through to the end of the 2014 season.

== Grounds ==
=== List A ===
Below is a complete list of grounds used by Northumberland County Cricket Club when it was permitted to play List A matches. These grounds have also held Minor Counties Championship and MCCA Knockout Trophy matches.

Name	Location	First	Last	Matches	First	Last	Matches	First	Last	Matches	Refs
Name	Location	List A			Minor Counties Championship			MCCA Trophy			Refs
Osborne Avenue	Jesmond	15 May 1971 v Lincolnshire	3 May 2005 v Middlesex	12	7 June 1897 v Durham	20 July 2014 v Suffolk	463	22 May 1983 v Cumberland	11 May 2014 v Shropshire	28	(Note: Two first-class matches have been played here by the Minor Counties cricket team against the touring South Africans on 14 July 1965, and the touring Pakistanis on 20 July 1974.) (Note: Minor Counties East played two List A matches here in the 1977 and 1979 Benson & Hedges Cup, while a combined Minor Counties team played three List A matches here in the 1995 and 1996 Benson & Hedges Cup. Durham also played a List A match here in the 1992 Benson & Hedges Cup. Only the List A matches played by Northumberland at the ground are recorded in the table.)

=== Minor Counties ===
Below is a complete list of grounds used by Northumberland County Cricket Club in Minor Counties Championship and MCCA Knockout Trophy matches.

Name	Location	First	Last	Matches	First	Last	Matches	Refs
Name	Location	Minor Counties Championship			MCCA Trophy			Refs
Northumberland Club Ground	Heaton	7 July 1896 v Staffordshire	12 August 1896 v Northamptonshire	4	–	–	0	
Preston Avenue	North Shields	7 July 1947 v Staffordshire	8 June 2014 v Norfolk	3	25 June 2000 v Cumberland	21 May 2006 v Cheshire	4	
Roseworth Terrace	Gosforth	15 July 1957 v Cumberland	22 June 2014 v Lincolnshire	3	7 June 1998 v Durham Cricket Board	22 April 2012 v Cheshire	7	(Note: Durham played a single List A match here in the 2014 Royal London One-Day Cup against Warwickshire.)
Langwell Crescent	Ashington	24 July 1961 v Yorkshire Second XI	22 August 1966 v Cumberland	3	–	–	0	
Denton Bank	Benwell Hill	5 June 1983 v Cambridgeshire	24 June 2012 v Staffordshire	6	27 May 2001 v Lancashire Cricket Board	20 May 2007 v Herefordshire	2	
Longhirst Hall Ground	near Morpeth	–	–	0	18 May 2008 v Norfolk	17 May 2009 v Staffordshire	2	
Derwenthaugh Park	Swalwell	only match: 26 June 2011 v Lincolnshire		1	–	–	0	
