= List of Wiltshire County Cricket Club grounds =

Wiltshire County Cricket Club was established in January 1893. It has played minor counties cricket from 1895 and played List A cricket from 1964 to 2005, using a varying number of home grounds during that time. Their first home minor counties fixture in 1895 was against Bedfordshire at the County Ground, Trowbridge, while their first home List A match came 69 years later against Hampshire in the 1964 Gillette Cup at Hardenhuish Park, Chippenham.

The thirteen grounds that Wiltshire have used for home matches since 1895 are listed below, with statistics complete through to the end of the 2014 season.

== Grounds ==
=== List A ===
Below is a complete list of grounds used by Wiltshire County Cricket Club when it was permitted to play List A matches. These grounds have also held Minor Counties Championship and MCCA Knockout Trophy matches.

Name	Location	First	Last	Matches	First	Last	Matches	First	Last	Matches	Refs
Name	Location	List A			Minor Counties Championship			MCCA Trophy			Refs
Hardenhuish Park	Chippenham	2 May 1964 v Hampshire	1 May 2001 v Derbyshire Cricket Board	2	26 June 1902 v Dorset	25 July 1989 v Shropshire	47	5 May 2002 v Somerset Cricket Board	8 June 2003 v Buckinghamshire	2	(Note: Minor Counties South, Minor Counties West and a combined Minor Counties team all played List A matches here from 1972–1980 in the Benson & Hedges Cup. Only the List A matches played by Wiltshire at the ground are recorded in the table.)
The County Ground	Swindon	29 June 1983 v Northamptonshire	4 July 1984 v Leicestershire	2	3 August 1897 v Glamorgan	24 May 1998 v Wales Minor Counties	84	25 June 2000 v Gloucestershire Cricket Board	16 June 2002 v Dorset	3	(Note: Gloucestershire played List A matches here between 1970–1992, while Minor Counties South played a single List A match here against Gloucestershire in the 1973 Benson & Hedges Cup. Only the List A matches played by Wiltshire at the ground are recorded in the table. One first-class match has been played here by a combined Minor Counties team against the touring Pakistanis in 1967.)
County Ground	Trowbridge	24 June 1987 v Yorkshire	22 June 1993 v Durham	3	1 July 1895 v Bedfordshire	4 August 2013 v Wales Minor Counties	123	12 August 1983 v Shropshire	29 May 2011 v Wales Minor Counties	11	(Note: Gloucestershire played a single List A match here against Hampshire in the 1989 Refuge Assurance League, while a combined Minor Counties cricket team played two List A matches here in the 1991 Benson & Hedges Cup. Only the List A matches played by Wiltshire at the ground are recorded in the table. One first-class match has been played here by a combined Minor Counties team against the touring Indians in 1990.)
Salisbury and South Wiltshire Sports Club	Salisbury	2 May 2000 v Scotland	3 May 2005 v Kent	3	4 July 1905 v Hertfordshire	7 September 2014 v Staffordshire	86	only match: 17 May 1998 v Herefordshire		1	

=== Minor Counties ===
Below is a complete list of grounds used by Wiltshire County Cricket Club in Minor Counties Championship and MCCA Knockout Trophy matches.

Name	Location	First	Last	Matches	First	Last	Matches	Refs
Name	Location	Minor Counties Championship			MCCA Trophy			Refs
British Rail Ground	Swindon	29 May 1901 v Glamorgan	21 June 1992 v Oxfordshire	28	–	–	0	
Wellhead Lane	Westbury	7 August 1912 v Surrey Second XI	3 August 2003 v Berkshire	15	15 August 2004 v Northumberland	30 April 2006 v Oxfordshire	3	(Note: Wiltshire were scheduled to play a List A match here against Nottinghamshire in the 2004 Cheltenham & Gloucester Trophy, however the match was abandoned due to rain.)
Melksham	Melksham	26 August 1912 v Buckinghamshire	28 July 1922 v Berkshire	5	–	–	0	(Note: The exact ground used in Melksham is not known.)
Marlborough College Ground	Marlborough	6 August 1920 v Glamorgan	8 July 1993 v Herefordshire	20	only match: 7 August 1983 v Norfolk		1	
London Road	Devizes	20 August 1965 v Berkshire	20 July 2014 v Devon	27	31 May 1992 v Dorset	13 May 2013 v Suffolk	7	
The Worthys	Malmesbury	26 July 1972 v Oxfordshire	19 August 1976 v Dorset	3	–	–	0	
Savernake Forest Ground	Marlborough	7 August 1994 v Dorset	16 July 2000 v Oxfordshire	7	–	–	0	
Station Road	Corsham	14 June 1998 v Berkshire	22 June 2014 v Dorset	17	1 June 1997 v Norfolk	15 June 2014 v Norfolk	11	
Sambourne Road	Warminster	only match: 11 June 2000 v Berkshire		1	27 June 1999 v Warwickshire Cricket Board	25 May 2014 v Wales Minor Counties	3	
