= St George's Road, Millom =

Cricket ground in England

St George's Road
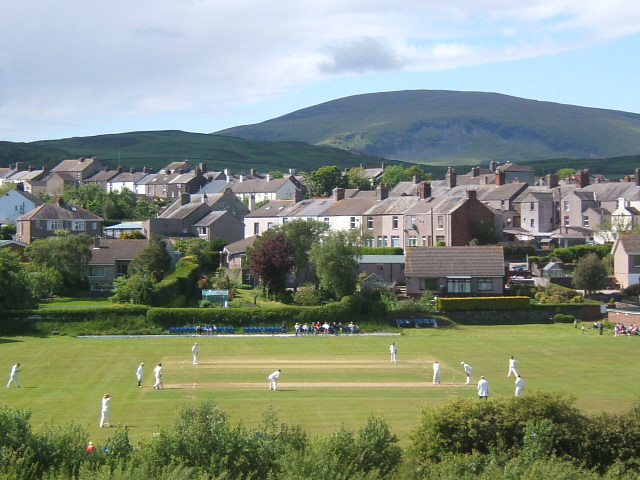

Ground information
- Location: Millom, Cumberland
- Coordinates: 54.2101°N 3.2741°W
- Establishment: c. 1925

Team information
Cumberland	(1961–2002)
- As of 19 August 2010; Source: Ground profile

St George's Road is a cricket ground located off St George's Road in Millom, Cumberland. The ground is bordered to the south–east by the Cumbrian Coast Line and to the north and west by housing. It is the home venue of Millom Cricket Club.

== History ==
Constructed prior to 1925, the first recorded match on the ground saw Cumberland (Note: This was an informal Cumberland team, with present Cumberland County Cricket Club not formed until 1948.) play a North Lancashire League team in 1925. Cumberland first played at the ground the 1961 Minor Counties Championship against the Lancashire Second XI. The county played four further Minor Counties Championship matches there in the 1960s, before a single match annually there between 1971 and 1994, with the exception of 1977, when no match was played there. Cumberland played four further Minor Counties Championship matches there, the last of which saw them play Suffolk in 2000. Cumberland have played a total of 32 Minor Counties Championship at the ground to date. In 2001, the ground hosted its only List A match when Cumberland played the Warwickshire Cricket Board in the 2002 Cheltenham & Gloucester Trophy, (Note: Early rounds were played in 2001 to avoid fixture congestion in 2002.) which the Warwickshire Cricket Board won by 17 runs, thanks largely to Jim Troughton's 115 runs and four wickets. The following season, the ground hosted a single MCCA Knockout Trophy between Cumberland and the Yorkshire Cricket Board, however the match was abandoned without a ball bowled.

== See also ==
- List of cricket grounds in England and Wales
