= Osborne Avenue =

Cricket ground in Jesmond, England

Coordinates: 54°59′14″N 1°35′58″W

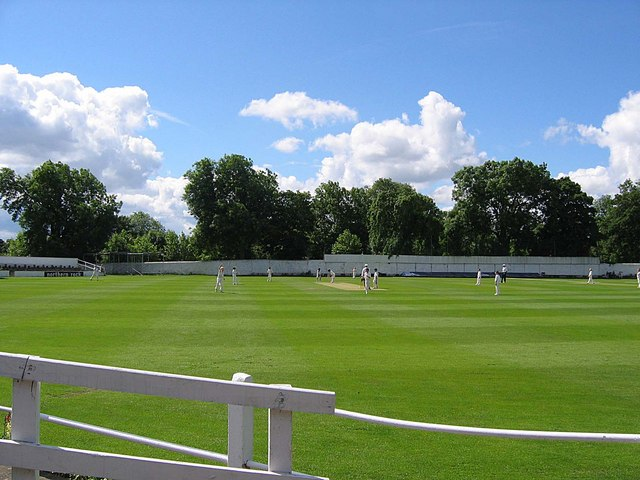

Ground information
- Location: Jesmond, Tyne and Wear, United Kingdom
- Establishment: 1887
- End names
- Osborne Avenue End; Cemetery End

Team information
Northumberland	(1897–present)
- As of 6 June 2010; Source: Ground profile

Osborne Avenue is a cricket ground in Jesmond, Tyne and Wear. It was originally known as the Constabulary Ground. It is currently the home ground of Newcastle Cricket Club, Royal Grammar School Newcastle and Northumberland County Cricket Club.

== History ==
The first cricket match was played there in 1887, though the first recorded match was in 1894, when Northumberland played a minor match against FGH Clayton's XI. In 1897, the ground hosted its first Minor Counties Championship match when Northumberland played Durham. From 1897 to the present day, Osborne Avenue has hosted 457 Minor Counties Championship and 24 MCCA Knockout Trophy matches. Two first-class matches have been played on Osborne Avenue, the first of which came in 1965 when a combined Minor Counties team played the touring South Africans, a match which the South Africans won by 243 runs. The second of these saw the Minor Counties play the touring Pakistanis in 1974, a match which the Pakistanis won by 5 wickets. The first List A match played there came in the 1971 Gillette Cup between Northumberland and Lincolnshire. From 1971 to 2005, the ground played host to twenty List A matches, the last of which saw Northumberland play Middlesex in the 2005 Cheltenham & Gloucester Trophy. In addition to Northumberland, the ground also served as a home venue for Minor Counties East and Minor Counties North in the Benson and Hedges Cup one-day competition.

Northumberland County Cricket Club encountered financial difficulties in 2004, leaving them with the possibility of having to move from the ground, which is owned by a group of trustees. £30,000 was required to save the ground, with the savingcricket@jesmond campaign set up to promote the campaign to save the ground. The campaign was a success and Osborne Avenue was saved from closure in 2006 following a two-year campaign, which ended with Newcastle's Royal Grammar School taking over the lease of the ground. The campaign was supported by Newcastle City Council, sporting icon Sir Bobby Robson, as well as figures from the cricketing world such as England and Durham bowler Steve Harmison, who acted as the campaigns patron. Other notable players lent their support to the campaign, including Australian Dennis Lillee who wrote: “Most cricket grounds are forgettable. However, in my opinion, Jesmond should live forever. It should be a monument to what cricket is and should never lose”. Former England captain Mike Brearley and former England women's player Dorothy Macfarlane also gave their support to the campaign. Following the successful campaign the ground remains in use by Newcastle Cricket Club, and though Northumberland County Cricket Club gave up their lease of the ground, they continue to use it as a base and play some home matches there.

== See also ==
- List of cricket grounds in England and Wales
