= List of Cheshire County Cricket Club grounds =

Cheshire County Cricket Club was established on 29 September 1908. Though a previous incarnation of the club had played in the 1895 Minor Counties Championship, the club in its current form has since played minor counties cricket from 1909 and played List A cricket from 1964 to 2004, using a different number of home grounds during that time. Their first home minor counties fixture in 1895 was against Staffordshire at Cale Green, Stockport, while their first List A match came 68 years later against Surrey in the 1964 Gillette Cup at the Ellerman Lines Cricket Ground, Hoylake.

The 35 grounds that Cheshire have used for home matches since 1895 are listed below, with statistics complete through to the end of the 2014 season.

== Grounds ==
=== List A ===
Below is a complete list of grounds used by Cheshire County Cricket Club when it was permitted to play List A matches. These grounds have also held Minor Counties Championship and MCCA Knockout Trophy matches.

Name	Location	First	Last	Matches	First	Last	Matches	First	Last	Matches	Refs
Name	Location	List A			Minor Counties Championship			MCCA Trophy			Refs
Ellerman Lines Cricket Ground	Hoylake	only match: 6 May 1964 v Surrey		1	14 August 1957 v Northumberland	19 June 1968 v Yorkshire Second XI	13	–	–	0	
Victoria Road	Macclesfield	28 April 1966 v Lancashire	25 May 1968 v Northamptonshire	3	28 July 1920 v Staffordshire	13 June 1982 v Staffordshire	44	24 September 1983 v Bedfordshire	7 June 1984 v Hertfordshire	2	(Note: Minor Counties North played a single List A match at the ground against Lancashire in the 1974 Benson & Hedges Cup. Only the List A matches played by Cheshire at the ground are recorded in the table.)
Townfield Lane	Oxton	3 July 1985 v Yorkshire	25 June 1986 v Surrey	2	22 July 1895 v Worcestershire	13 June 2004 v Devon	49	14 June 1987 v Cumberland	28 June 1987 v Lincolnshire	2	(Note: A combined Minor Counties cricket team played a single List A match at the ground against Nottinghamshire in the 1989 Benson & Hedges Cup. Only the List A matches played by Cheshire at the ground are recorded in the table.)
Boughton Hall Cricket Club Ground	Boughton	22 June 1988 v Northamptonshire	29 August 2001 v Lancashire Cricket Board	7	6 July 1910 v Northumberland	16 August 2015 v Herefordshire	56	17 May 1992 v Northumberland	15 June 2014 v Herefordshire	6	(Note: Minor Counties North played a single List A match at the ground against Lancashire in the 1972 Benson & Hedges Cup. Only the List A matches played by Cheshire at the ground are recorded in the table.)
Walton Lea Road	Warrington	only match: 22 June 1993 v Nottinghamshire		1	30 August 1978 v Lancashire Second XI	30 August 1994 v Berkshire	8	8 June 1986 v Durham	30 June 1996 v Hertfordshire	6	
South Downs Road	Bowdon	21 June 1994 v Durham	23 June 1999 v Kent	2	8 August 1910 v Durham	20 July 2014 v Wales Minor Counties	25	–	–	0	(Note: A combined Minor Counties cricket team played a single List A match at the ground against Lancashire in the 1984 Benson & Hedges Cup. Only the List A matches played by Cheshire at the ground are recorded in the table.)
Booth Park	Toft	13 August 2001 v Cornwall	29 August 2002 v Huntingdonshire	2	28 July 1982 v Northumberland	2 June 2998 v Oxfordshire	14	only match: 7 June 2012 v Dorset		1	
Parkgate Cricket Ground	Parkgate	only match: 12 September 2002 v Lincolnshire		1	21 August 1935 v Denbighshire	13 August 2000 v Berkshire	27	20 May 1984 v Cumberland	11 May 2014 v Cumberland	6	
Moss Lane	Alderley Edge	only match: 5 May 2004 v Hampshire		1	1 August 1973 v Lancashire Second XI	2 August 2015 v Berkshire	19	–	–	0	(Note: Lancashire played a single List A match at the ground against a touring Bangladesh A team on 30 July 2008. Only the List A matches played by Cheshire at the ground are recorded in the table.)

=== Minor Counties ===
Below is a complete list of grounds used by Cheshire County Cricket Club in Minor Counties Championship and MCCA Knockout Trophy matches.

Name	Location	First	Last	Matches	First	Last	Matches	Refs
Name	Location	Minor Counties Championship			MCCA Trophy			Refs
Cale Green	Stockport	7 June 1895 v Staffordshire	24 June 1953 v Lancashire Second XI	4	–	–	0	
Park Drive	Birkenhead	8 July 1895 v Durham	23 July 1930 v Staffordshire	4	–	–	0	
Rookwood	Sale	only match: 26 May 1909 v Yorkshire Second XI		1	–	–	0	
Alexandra Athletic Ground	Crewe	7 July 1909 v Staffordshire	5 August 1939 v Lincolnshire	20	–	–	0	
Winnington Park	Northwich	28 July 1909 v Northumberland	7 June 1922 v Staffordshire	4	–	–	0	
The Recreation Ground	Bollington	4 August 1909 v Nottinghamshire Second XI	27 June 1923 v Staffordshire	7	–	–	0	
Gorse Hall Road	Dukinfield	7 June 1914 v Staffordshire	14 June 1993 v Cornwall	8	only match: 2 June 1991 v Cumberland		1	
Rake Lane	Wallasey	10 August 1914 v Durham	12 July 1998 v Berkshire	18	21 July 1996 v Buckinghamshire	14 May 2006 v Herefordshire	6	
Aigburth Cricket Ground	Liverpool	8 June 1920 v Glamorgan	18 August 1920 v Northumberland	3	–	–	0	(Note: Aigburth Cricket Ground is based in the adjacent county of Lancashire. Only the Minor Counties Championship matches played by Cheshire at the ground are recorded in the table.)
Kingsley Fields	Nantwich	18 June 1930 v Lancashire Second XI	11 July 1955 v Northumberland	5	–	–	0	
Haddon Field	Middlewich	29 May 1946 v Lancashire Second XI	7 August 1957 v Staffordshire	7	–	–	0	
Stockport Road	Timperley	only match: 2 July 1947 v Lancashire Second XI		1	–	–	0	
Cheadle Sports Club	Cheadle	16 August 1948 v Northumberland	18 May 1949 v Staffordshire	2	–	–	0	
Brooklands Sports Club	Sale	24 May 1950 v Yorkshire Second XI	17 July 1960 v Warwickshire Second XI	2	–	–	0	
Luke and Spencers Ground	Altrincham	only match: 18 June 1952 v Lancashire Second XI		1	–	–	0	
London Midland Railway Sports Club Ground	Crewe	only match: 17 June 1959 v Staffordshire		1	–	–	0	
Vicarage Road	Northwich	10 August 1964 v Northumberland	27 July 1980 v Shropshire	18	7 August 1983 v Durham	16 June 1985 v Suffolk	3	
Queensgate	Bramhall	31 May 1967 v Staffordshire	4 August 1974 v Durham	2	–	–	0	
Whitehouse Lane	Nantwich	20 June 1976 v Staffordshire	17 August 2014 v Oxfordshire	17	22 May 1988 v Staffordshire	12 June 2005 v Wales Minor Counties	6	
Grove Park	Cheadle Hulme	26 May 1982 v Durham	2 June 2002 v Oxfordshire	4	19 June 1988 v Lincolnshire	20 June 2004 v Berkshire	5	
Old Greasby Road	Upton-by-Chester	only match: 26 June 1994 v Wales Minor Counties		1	–	–	0	
Broad Lane	Grappenhall	5 July 2015 v Dorset	7 July 2015 v Dorset	1	30 April 2006 v Cumberland	16 May 2010 v Staffordshire	3	
Little Heath	Christleton	–	–	0	20 May 2007 v Shropshire	2 May 2012 v Cumberland	3	
The Michael Hibbert Cricket Ground	Marple	–	–	0	1 June 2008 v Cumberland	15 May 2011 v Northumberland	4	
Church Lane	Woodford	–	–	0	20 May 2012 v Herefordshire	20 May 2014 v Lincolnshire	2	
Werneth Low	Hyde	–	–	0	only match: 2 June 2013 v Northumberland		1	
