= List of Cumbria County Cricket Club grounds =

Cumbria County Cricket Club was established on 10 April 1946 as the Cumberland and Westmorland County Cricket Club, though the Westmorland was dropped from the name shortly thereafter. The club changed its name to Cumbria County Cricket Club in 2021. It has since played minor counties cricket from 1955 and played List A cricket from 1984 to 2003, using a different number of home grounds during that time. Their first minor counties fixture in 1955 was against the Yorkshire Second XI at Edenside, Carlisle, while their first List A match came 29 years later against Derbyshire in the 1984 NatWest Trophy at Parkside Road, Kendal.

The sixteen grounds that Cumbria have used for home matches since 1955 are listed below, with statistics complete through to the end of the 2014 season.

== Grounds ==
=== List A ===
Below is a complete list of grounds used by Cumberland County Cricket Club when it was permitted to play List A matches. These grounds have also held Minor Counties Championship and MCCA Knockout Trophy matches.

Name	Location	First	Last	Matches	First	Last	Matches	First	Last	Matches	Refs
Name	Location	List A			Minor Counties Championship			MCCA Trophy			Refs
Parkside Road	Kendal	4 July 1984 v Derbyshire	23 June 1999 v Sussex	5	1 August 1956 v Lancashire Second XI	9 July 2007 v Norfolk	44	4 May 2008 v Bedfordshire	5 June 2011 v Shropshire	3	
Edenside	Carlisle	25 June 1996 v Middlesex	21 June 2000 v Kent	2	25 May 1955 v Yorkshire Second XI	9 August 2009 v Lincolnshire	45	–	–	0	
Ernest Pass Memorial Ground	Barrow-in-Furness	24 June 1997 v Northamptonshire	27 June 2001 v Kent	2	10 June 1984 v Northumberland	8 June 2014 v Buckinghamshire	25	4 June 2006 v Northumberland	3 June 2007 v Cheshire	2	(Note: Prior to the Local Government Act 1972, Barrow-in-Furness was administered as part of Lancashire, after which it formed part of the new county of Cumbria. Prior to 1972 the ground was used by the Lancashire Second XI in the Minor Counties Championship. Only the Minor Counties Championship matches played by Cumberland at the ground are recorded in the table.)
St George's Road	Millom	only match: 29 August 2001 v Warwickshire Cricket Board		1	28 June 1961 v Lancashire Second XI	31 July 2000 v Suffolk	32	only match: 21 May 2002 v Yorkshire Cricket Board		1	
Fitz Park	Keswick	only match: 29 August 2002 v Nottinghamshire Cricket Board		1	3 August 1955 v Lancashire Second XI	17 August 2008 v Northumberland	10	13 May 2000 v Lancashire Cricket Board	3 June 2001 v Northumberland	2	

=== Minor Counties ===
Below is a complete list of grounds used by the Cumberland County Cricket Club in Minor Counties Championship and MCCA Knockout Trophy matches.

Name	Location	First	Last	Matches	First	Last	Matches	Refs
Name	Location	Minor Counties Championship			MCCA Trophy			Refs
The Playground	Whitehaven	24 August 1955 v Durham	17 August 1980 v Durham	9	–	–	0	
Ernest Valentine Ground	Workington	4 June 1956 v Yorkshire Second XI	2 June 1988 v Suffolk	11	2 June 1985 v Cheshire	21 May 2012 v Cambridgeshire	5	
Tynefield Park	Penrith	23 June 1958 v Lancashire Second XI	14 June 1994 v Buckinghamshire	23	25 May 1986 v Cheshire	2 June 2013 v Herefordshire	12	
Vicars Croft	Appleby-in-Westmorland	21 June 1967 v Yorkshire Second XI	15 July 1990 v Lincolnshire	3	–	–	0	
Shap Road	Kendal	9 July 1967 v Durham	24 July 1977 v Durham	2	20 May 1990 v Northumberland	4 May 2014 v Northumberland	3	
United Steel Ground	Workington	10 July 1968 v Yorkshire Second XI	28 June 1970 v Durham	2	–	–	0	
Duddon Sports Club Ground	Askam-in-Furness	18 June 1995 v Lincolnshire	11 July 2000 v Staffordshire	5	22 May 1994 v Lincolnshire	17 June 2001 v Durham Cricket Board	3	
Sedbergh School Ground	Sedbergh	11 June 2006 v Staffordshire	17 August 2014 v Northumberland	9	only match: 12 June 2005 v Oxfordshire		1	
Furness Park	Barrow-in-Furness	20 June 2010 v Norfolk	6 July 2014 v Bedfordshire	6	17 May 1992 v Lincolnshire	14 May 2006 v Shropshire	6	
Sandair	Cockermouth	–	–	0	only match: 25 May 2014 v Shropshire		1	
