= List of Essex County Cricket Club grounds =

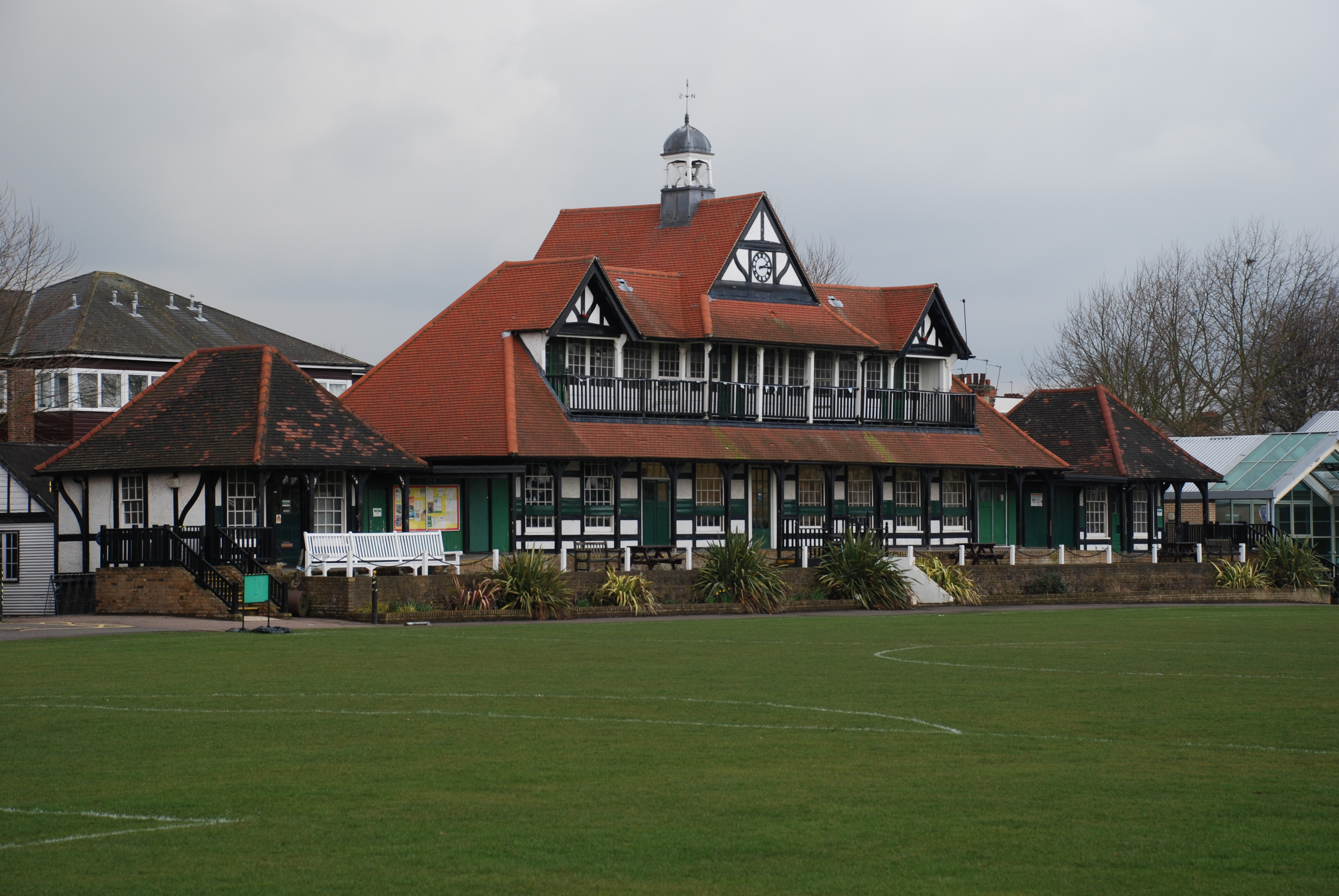
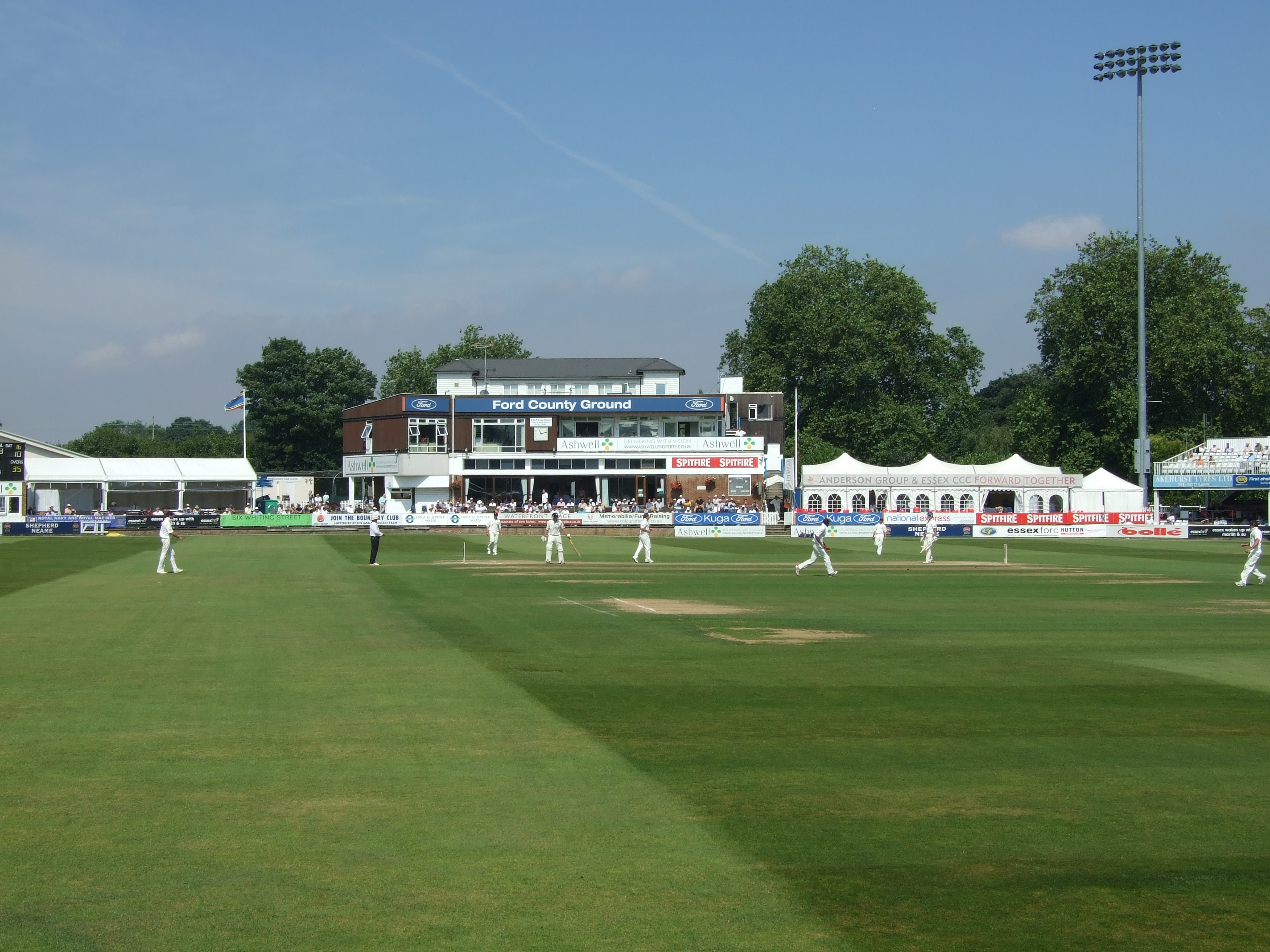
The County Ground in Leyton (left) was Essex's original first-class venue, but it has not been used since 1977, and all matches are now held at the similarly-named County Ground in Chelmsford (right).

Essex County Cricket Club is one of the 18 member clubs of the English County Championship, representing the historic county of Essex. The club was established on 14 January 1876 and has played first-class cricket since 1894, List A cricket since 1963 and Twenty20 cricket since 2003.^{[A]} Unlike most professional sports, in which a team usually has a single fixed home ground, county cricket clubs have traditionally used different grounds in various towns and cities within the county for home matches, although the use of minor "out grounds" has diminished since the 1980s. Essex have played first class, List A, or Twenty20 matches at 14 different grounds.

The club's debut home fixture in first-class cricket was played at the County Ground in Leyton against Leicestershire in 1894. This ground remained the county's headquarters and principal match venue until the end of the 1933 season and was used regularly for over 80 years. Until April 2024 it had still hosted more of the county's first-class matches than any other ground. Essex played their final match at the venue in 1977, however, since when the similarly named County Ground in Chelmsford has hosted the majority of first-class games. The ground in Leyton has continued to be used for matches in local competitions.

The club's first home List A fixture took place in 1965 against Derbyshire at the Old County Ground in Brentwood. This venue had been used since the 1920s for first-class matches, but only staged two List A matches, and its use was discontinued altogether in 1969. The County Ground in Chelmsford played host to the club's first home Twenty20 fixture in 2003, against Kent, and has since hosted every one of the county's home Twenty20 matches with the exception of a single game in 2014 which was played at Castle Park in Colchester.

Essex traditionally staged annual "cricket festivals" in the towns of Colchester, Ilford and Southend-on-Sea, which usually consisted of two first-class matches over the course of a week, and later incorporated one List A match following the introduction of that format. The Ilford event was abandoned following the 2002 season. The Southend festival moved from its traditional home at Southchurch Park to Garon Park in 2005, making the latter venue the county's only new home ground of the 21st century. Following the 2011 season, however, Essex discontinued the Southend festival altogether, leaving Castle Park in Colchester as the only venue regularly used by the county other than its main base in Chelmsford. The Colchester festival was not held in 2017, and all the county's home games were played at Chelmsford; the Colchester festival has remained suspended.

== Grounds ==
Below is a complete list of grounds used by Essex County Cricket Club for first-class, List A and Twenty20 matches. Statistics are complete through to the end of the 2026 season. Only matches played by Essex CCC at the grounds are recorded in the table. Matches abandoned without any play occurring are not included.

Name	Location	First-class			List A			Twenty20		
Name	Location	First	Last	Matches	First	Last	Matches	First	Last	Matches
County Ground	Leyton	14 May 1894 v Essex	10 August 1977 v Glamorgan	407	3 August 1969 v Sussex	7 August 1977 v Derbyshire	10	–	–	0
Southchurch Park	Southend-on-Sea	13 August 1906 v Leicestershire	28 July 2004 v Nottinghamshire	130	10 July 1977 v Middlesex	25 July 2004 v Northamptonshire	28	–	–	0
Castle Park	Colchester	18 June 1914 v Worcestershire	4 August 2016 v Sussex	123	30 June 1974 v Yorkshire	5 August 2015 v Middlesex	46	12 July 2014 v Kent	no other matches to date	1
Old County Ground	Brentwood	5 July 1922 v Dublin University	24 May 1969 v Worcestershire	58	28 April 1965 v Derbyshire	13 May 1967 v Kent	2	–	–	0
Valentines Park	Ilford	9 June 1923 v West Indians	12 June 2002 v Northamptonshire	116	15 June 1969 v Middlesex	16 June 2002 v Lancashire	37	–	–	0
Garrison A Cricket Ground	Colchester	18 June 1924 v Gloucestershire	7 June 1972 v Somerset	25	26 June 1970 v Yorkshire	4 June 1972 v Lancashire	2	–	–	0
County Ground	Chelmsford	20 June 1925 v Oxford University	15 September 2026 v Warwickshire	427	27 April 1969 v Nottinghamshire	11 August 2026 v Yorkshire	389^{[B]}	20 June 2003 v Kent	10 July 2026 v Hampshire	133
Vista Road Recreation Ground	Clacton-on-Sea	22 July 1931 v Lancashire	20 August 1966 v Leicestershire	60	–	–	0	–	–	0
Chalkwell Park	Westcliff-on-Sea	13 June 1934 v Nottinghamshire	10 July 1976 v Worcestershire	69	12 July 1970 v Middlesex	11 July 1976 v Leicestershire	8	–	–	0
Gidea Park Sports Ground	Romford	24 May 1950 v Hampshire	22 May 1968 v Surrey	34	–	–	0	–	–	0
Hoffmann's Sports and Social Club Ground	Chelmsford	29 August 1959 v Lancashire	14 June 1961 v South Africa Fezelas	3	6 July 1969 v Northamptonshire	no other matches	1	–	–	0
Harlow Sportcentre	Harlow	27 June 1970 v Cambridge University	1 July 1970 v Kent	2	25 May 1969 v Worcestershire	27 June 1982 v Leicestershire	7	–	–	0
Thames Board Mills Sports Ground	Purfleet	–	–	0	20 July 1969 v Kent	9 July 1972 v Glamorgan	4	–	–	0
Garon Park	Southend-on-Sea	3 August 2005 v Durham	27 July 2011 v Leicestershire	7	7 August 2005 v Middlesex	31 July 2011 v Somerset	7	–	–	0

== Notes ==
A. First-class cricket matches are designed to be contested over multiple days, with each team permitted two innings with no limit to the number of overs in an innings. List A matches are intended to be completed in a single day and restrict each team to a single innings of between 40 and 60 overs, depending on the specific competition. Twenty20 matches restrict each team to a single innings of 20 overs.

B. The Essex Cricket Board played four List A matches at the County Ground between 2000 and 2003, including one match against Essex. The Essex Cricket Board is a separate organisation from Essex County Cricket Club and its matches are not included in the totals. The match between the Board team and Essex CCC is excluded as the Board team were officially the home team.
