= List of Northamptonshire County Cricket Club grounds =

Northamptonshire County Cricket Club was established on 31 July 1878. The county entered the Minor Counties Championship in 1895 and competed in the competition until 1904, after which it was elevated to first-class status for the 1905 season. It has since played first-class cricket from 1905, List A cricket from 1963 and Twenty20 cricket from 2003, using a different number of home grounds during that time. The County Ground in Northampton has played host to the club's first home fixtures in all three formats of the game; in first-class cricket in 1905 against Leicestershire; in List A cricket in 1963 against Warwickshire; and in Twenty20 cricket against Somerset in 2003. Northamptonshire have played home matches at sixteen grounds, but have played the majority of their home fixtures at the County Ground, which has also held One Day Internationals.

The sixteen grounds that Northamptonshire have used for home matches since 1895 are listed below, with statistics complete through to the end of the 2014 season.

== Grounds ==
=== Minor county ===
Below is a complete list of grounds used by Northamptonshire County Cricket Club in Minor Counties Championship matches before its elevation to first-class status in 1905.

| Name | Location | First | Last | Matches | Refs |
| Name | Location | Minor Counties Championship | | | Refs |
|---|---|---|---|---|---|
| County Ground | Northampton | 7 August 1895 v Staffordshire | 22 August 1904 v Durham | 49 | |

=== First-class county ===
Below is a complete list of grounds used by Northamptonshire County Cricket Club in first-class, List A and Twenty20 matches following its elevation to first-class status in 1905.

| Name | Location | First | Last | Matches | First | Last | Matches | First | Last | Matches | Refs |
| Name | Location | First-class | | | List A | | | Twenty20 | | | Refs |
|---|---|---|---|---|---|---|---|---|---|---|---|
| County Ground | Northampton | 5 June 1905 v Leicestershire | 23 September 2014 v Sussex | 1,019 | 22 May 1963 v Warwickshire | 21 August 2014 v Essex | 376 | 20 June 2003 v Somerset | 23 July 2014 v Nottinghamshire | 55 | (Note: Only the first-class and List A matches played by Northamptonshire at the ground are recorded in the table.) |
| Town Ground | Peterborough | 7 June 1906 v Warwickshire | 18 June 1966 v Essex | 46 | – | – | 0 | – | – | 0 | |
| Town Ground | Kettering | 7 July 1923 v Glamorgan | 21 August 1971 v Surrey | 65 | 21 June 1970 v Sussex | 10 June 1973 v Glamorgan | 4 | – | – | 0 | |
| Town Ground | Rushden | 28 June 1924 v Dublin University | 18 May 1963 v Lancashire | 22 | – | – | 0 | – | – | 0 | |
| Ideal Clothiers Ground | Wellingborough | only match: 22 June 1929 v Oxford University | | 1 | – | – | 0 | – | – | 0 | |
| Wellingborough School Ground | Wellingborough | 10 August 1946 v Hampshire | 19 July 1991 v Nottinghamshire | 43 | 9 August 1970 v Worcestershire | 21 July 1991 v Nottinghamshire | 17 | – | – | 0 | |
| Baker Perkins Sports Ground | Peterborough | 24 June 1967 v Kent | 14 June 1969 v Warwickshire | 3 | 15 June 1969 v Lancashire | 23 June 1974 v Warwickshire | 5 | – | – | 0 | |
| Westminster Road | Brackley | – | – | 0 | 18 July 1971 v Gloucestershire | 7 September 1975 v Nottinghamshire | 4 | – | – | 0 | |
| Bedford School Ground | Bedford | – | – | 0 | 1 August 1971 v Essex | 23 May 1982 v Lancashire | 2 | – | – | 0 | (Note: Bedford School Ground is located in the adjacent county of Bedfordshire.) |
| Wardown Park | Luton | 21 June 1986 v Yorkshire | 26 June 1997 v Gloucestershire | 11 | 24 June 1973 v Nottinghamshire | 21 May 1996 v Indians | 24 | only match: 5 July 2004 v Worcestershire | | 1 | (Note: Wardown Park is located in the adjacent county of Bedfordshire. Bedfordshire played List A matches here between 1967–2005, while a combined Minor Counties cricket team played one List A match here as the home team against Northamptonshire in the 1998 Benson & Hedges Cup. Only the List A matches played at the ground by Northamptonshire in which they were the home team are recorded in the table.) |
| London Road | Tring | – | – | 0 | 9 June 1974 v Middlesex | 7 July 1991 v Surrey | 16 | – | – | 0 | (Note: London Road is located two counties to the south of Northamptonshire in Hertfordshire.) |
| Denton Road | Horton | – | – | 0 | 24 May 1976 v Essex | 7 May 1977 v Minor Counties East | 2 | – | – | 0 | |
| Manor Fields | Bletchley | 17 May 1980 v West Indians | 13 June 1987 v Pakistanis | 3 | 22 August 1976 v Lancashire | 28 August 1983 v Middlesex | 7 | – | – | 0 | (Note: Manor Fields is located in the adjacent county of Buckinghamshire.) |
| Dolben Cricket Ground | Finedon | – | – | 0 | 13 July 1986 v Derbyshire | 23 July 1989 v Nottinghamshire | 3 | – | – | 0 | |
| Campbell Park | Milton Keynes | – | – | 0 | 8 June 1997 v Nottinghamshire | 29 July 2014 v Worcestershire | 3 | 22 June 2005 v Gloucestershire | 29 June 2011 v Worcestershire | 4 | (Note: Campbell Park is located in the adjacent county of Buckinghamshire. A First-Class Counties Select XI played one first-class match here against New Zealand A in 2000. The touring New Zealanders and Sri Lanka A played a List A match here in 1999. Only the List A matches played at the ground by Northamptonshire are recorded in the table.) |
| Stowe School Ground | Stowe | – | – | 0 | only match: 19 June 2005 v Gloucestershire | | 1 | – | – | 0 | (Note: Stowe School Ground is located in the adjacent county of Buckinghamshire.) |
