= Chain Wire Club Ground =

Cricket ground in Worcestershire, England

Coordinates: 52°21′26.94″N 2°16′29.93″W

The Chain Wire Club Ground in Stourport-on-Severn, Worcestershire, was used for first-class cricket by Worcestershire County Cricket Club on a single occasion: a County Championship match against Lancashire in 1980, which Worcestershire won by an innings and 153 runs. David Humphries made 108 not out for the home side, while Norman Gifford produced an outstanding first-innings return of 18-13-15-6, then took four more wickets in the second innings.

The ground was also used for three of the county's Second XI games between 1979 and 1980.
