= Lensbury Sports Ground =

Country Club in Teddington, London, England

Coordinates: 51.4268°N 0.3214°W

- Interactive map of Lensbury Sports Ground

Ground information
- Location: Teddington, London
- Country: England
- Establishment: 1932 (first recorded match)

International information
- Only women's ODI: 5 June 1979: England v West Indies
- As of 6 September 2020; Source: Ground profile

Lensbury Sports Ground is a cricket ground in Teddington, London (formerly Middlesex). The first recorded match on the ground was in 1932, when Affiliated South American Banks played the South Americans. From 1982 to 1998, the ground held a combined total of 17 Second XI fixtures for the Middlesex Second XI in the Second XI Championship and Second XI Trophy.

In 1979, the ground held a single Women's One Day International between England women and West Indies women.

In local domestic cricket, the ground is the home venue of St. Mary's University College cricket team.
