= Phillip's Field =

Sports venue in the UK

- Interactive map of Phillip's Field

Ground information
- Location: Bromley, Kent
- Country: England
- Coordinates: 51.409°N 0.025°E

Team information
Kent	(1840)
- As of 5 September 2010; Source: CricketArchive

Phillip's Field was a cricket ground in Bromley in Kent. The only recorded match on the ground was in 1840, when a Kent side played an England XI in the grounds only first-class cricket match.

The location of the ground today is roughly where St John's Church and Freelands Road are located.
