= Epsom Cricket Club =

Historical English cricket team

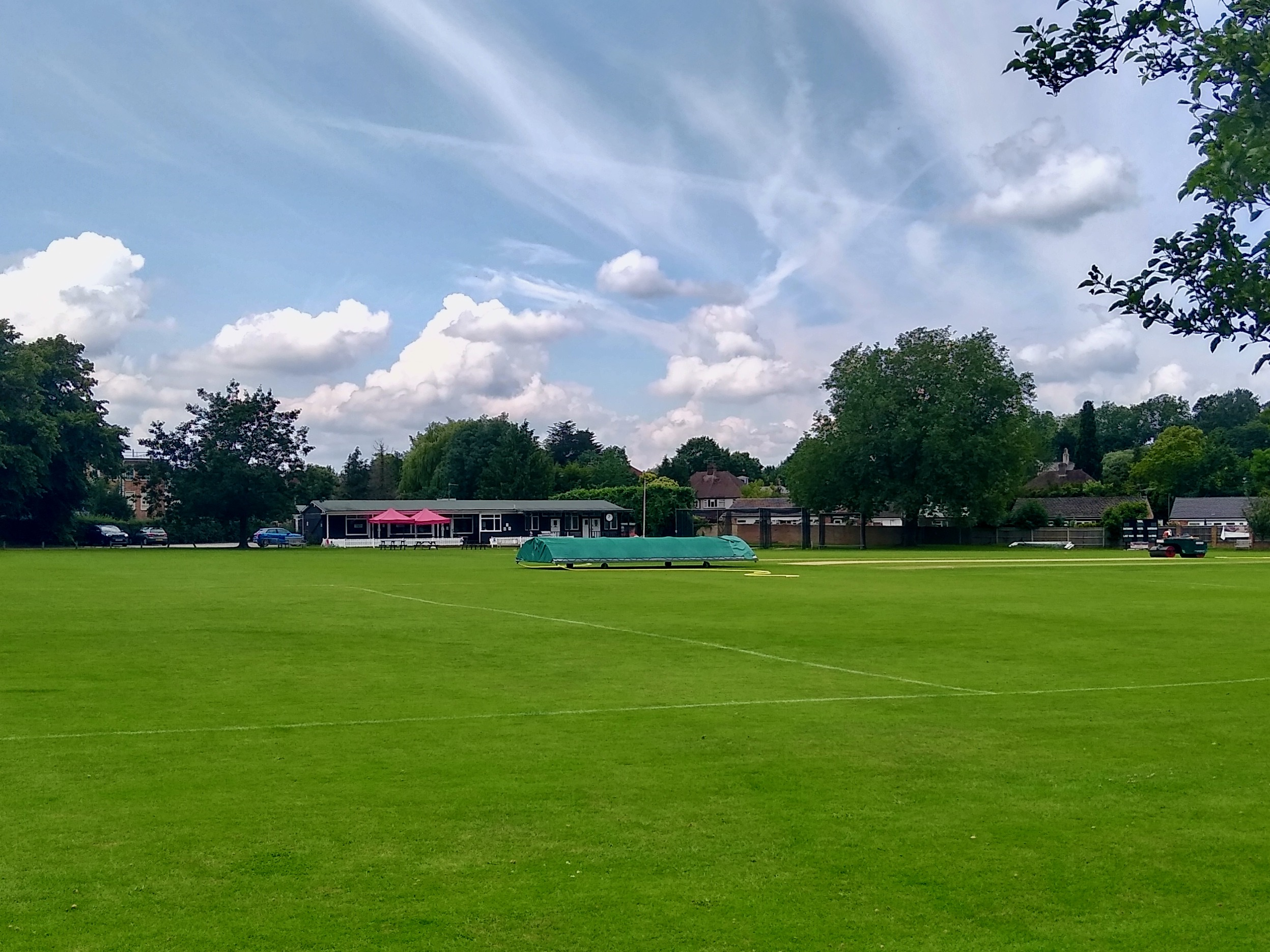
Epsom Cricket Club ground

Epsom Cricket Club is based at Epsom, Surrey, and was first recorded in 1730, and played important matches from 1814 to 1819. The current club is based at the Francis Schnadhorst Memorial ground in Woodcote Road, Epsom.

== History ==
Epsom is first recorded in 1730, playing against Sunbury on Epsom Down. The 19th century club is first recorded on 28–29 July 1814 when it played Brighton at the Royal New Ground in Brighton. Brighton won by 10 wickets. The club's last known historically important match in 1819 was against Hampshire at Epsom Downs and they lost that by 135 runs>

== Bibliography ==
- Buckley, G. B. (1935). Fresh Light on 18th Century Cricket. Cotterell.
