= Army Ground, Catterick =

Cricket ground in Catterick Garrison, England

Coordinates: 54.37669°N 1.72361°W

Army Ground
- Interactive map of Army Ground

Ground information
- Location: Catterick Garrison, North Yorkshire
- Country: England
- Establishment: c. 1940

Team information
| Combined Services | (1954) |
- As of 23 August 2010; Source: Ground profile

The Army Ground was a cricket ground in Catterick Garrison, North Yorkshire. The Garrison was established in 1914 and construction of a cricket ground for use by the British Army personnel stationed there followed. During the Second World War, services matches were played at the ground. Many of the participants in these matches were enlisted cricketers from Yorkshire, including Bill Bowes, Len Hutton and Hedley Verity. The ground hosted its only first-class cricket match in 1954, when a Combined Services cricket team played the touring Pakistanis. The Combined Services Gerry Tordoff recorded the only first-class century to be made there, with a score of 156 not out in the Combined Services first innings. The match would end in a draw. In 2015, a £25 million retail complex, Princes Gate, opened on the site of the ground.
