= Seth Somers Park =

Cricket ground

- Interactive map of Seth Somers Park
- Location: Halesowen, England, United Kingdom
- Coordinates: 52°26′40.66″N 2°02′46.37″W
- Owner: Seth Somers Trust

Construction
- Built: 1955-57
- Opened: 1957

Tenant
- Halesowen Cricket Club

Seth Somers Park is a cricket ground in Halesowen, West Midlands. It is home to Halesowen Cricket Club, whose 1st XI play in the Birmingham and District Premier League. The park was used for first-class cricket by Worcestershire on two occasions in the 1960s, at which time Halesowen lay in Worcestershire. In 1964 they beat Cambridge University by ten wickets, and five years later they beat the same opposition by an identical margin. Two games in the 1986 ICC Trophy were played at Seth Somers Park: Canada beat Hong Kong by four wickets, while Denmark beat Bermuda by six wickets.

== History ==
Seth Somers Park was built between 1955–57 and officially opened by Lord Cobham on 27 April 1957. Construction of the park was funded by the Seth Somers Trust who leased the ground to Halesowen Cricket Club for free.

Worcestershire Second XI played at the ground on a number of occasions between 1950 and 2001, while the recreational Worcestershire Cricket Board team played two ECB 38-County Cup games at the ground in 1999 and 2000.

In November 2019, Halesowen Cricket Club announced that they had agreed a new 25-year lease to keep Seth Somers Park as their home ground. On 31 March 2021 the club announced via its website that it would be applying to the Seth Somers Trust to rename the ground "The Trevor Argent Memorial Ground, Seth Somers Park" in memory of late chairman Trevor Argent.

== Records ==
=== First-class ===
- Highest team total: 276 by Worcestershire v Cambridge University, 1964
- Lowest team total: 79 by Cambridge University v Worcestershire, 1964
- Highest individual innings: 119 by Martin Horton for Worcestershire v Cambridge University, 1964
- Best bowling in an innings: 7-30 by Jim Standen for Worcestershire v Cambridge University, 1964
