= Ferham Park =

Cricket ground in Rotherham, Yorkshire, England

Coordinates: 53.43091°N 1.38004°W

Ground information
- Location: Rotherham, Yorkshire
- Establishment: 1869 (first recorded match)

Team information
North	(1880)
- As of 23 August 2010; Source: Ground profile

Ferham Park was a cricket ground in Rotherham, Yorkshire, England. The first recorded match on the ground was in 1880, when the North played a United South of England Eleven, in what was the ground's only first-class match. The final recorded match on the ground saw Rotherham play Yorkshire in 1914. The ground was later built on.
