= Mount Pleasant (cricket ground) =

Cricket ground in Batley, Yorkshire, England

Coordinates: 53.70731°N 1.63380°W

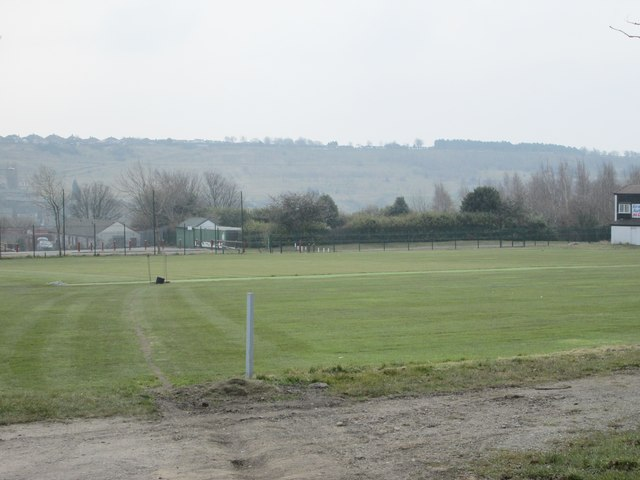

Ground information
- Location: Batley, West Yorkshire
- Establishment: 1869 (first recorded match)

Team information
| T Emmett's XI | (1883) |
- As of 23 August 2010; Source: Ground profile

Mount Pleasant is a cricket ground in Batley, West Yorkshire. The first recorded match on the ground was in 1869, when Batley played Burnley. The ground hosted a single first-class match in 1883 when the T. Emmett's XI played R. G. Barlow's XI.

The ground, adjacent to the stadium of Batley RLFC, is the home of Batley Cricket Club. They are members of the Central Yorkshire Cricket League.
