= Epsom Down =

Cricket ground in Epsom, Surrey, England

Coordinates: 51.307°N 0.271°W

- Interactive map of Epsom Down
- Location: Epsom, Surrey
- Home club: Epsom Cricket Club
- Establishment: 1816
- Last used: 1819

Epsom Down in the southern town outlands of Epsom was used as a venue for two cricket matches between 1816 and 1819. Both were between the local Epsom Cricket Club and the Hampshire county team. The approximate site is Epsom Downs Racecourse.

== Bibliograaphy ==
- ACS (1981). A Guide to Important Cricket Matches Played in the British Isles 1709–1863. Nottingham: ACS. OCLC 85045528.
- Haygarth, Arthur (1996) [1862]. Scores & Biographies, Volume 1 (1744–1826). Kennington: Frederick Lillywhite. ISBN 978-19-00592-23-9.
