= List of Norfolk County Cricket Club grounds =

This is a list of grounds that Norfolk County Cricket Club have used since the formation of the club in 1876. The club has played minor counties cricket (Note: Since 2020, minor counties have been known as the National Counties of English and Welsh cricket.) since 1895 and played List A cricket from 1965 to 2003, using 13 home grounds during that time. Before the club was formed, an informal county team had played some matches, including six matches between 1820 and 1836 which were later given first-class cricket status.

The county's first home minor counties fixture in 1895 was against Cambridgeshire at the County Ground, Lakenham in Norwich. Their first home List A match came 74 years later against Yorkshire in the 1969 Gillette Cup at the same venue. The County Ground, where cricket was first played in 1827, played host to the majority of Norfolk's home matches during the 20th century, before the club moved to Manor Park, Horsford at the beginning of the 21st century. That ground was used until the end of the 2024 season before the club moved its base to Barker's Lane in the Norwich suburb of Sprowston.

The 13 grounds that Norfolk have used for home matches in List A or Minor Counties matches since 1876 are listed below. The club has played other matches at grounds in the county. Before the establishment of the Minor Counties Championship in 1895, matches against other county teams were played at Lakenham, at New Ground in Norwich and at the Norfolk County Ground in East Dereham.

== Grounds ==
Below is the list of grounds used by Norfolk County Cricket Club in List A and Minor Counties cricket matches. Grounds are listed in order of their first use by the county. (Note: Matches known to have been abandoned without a ball being bowled are excluded from the count.)

As of 31 August 2025

Name	Location	List A	MCCA Champ	MCCA Trophy	MCCA T20	First match	Last match	Refs
County Ground	Norwich	7 (Note: Five first-class cricket matches were played at the County Ground: an England XI played the touring Australians in 1912, with the other four matches played by a combined Minor Counties cricket team against touring international teams between 1924 and 1986. Minor Counties North, Minor Counties East and a combined Minor Counties team played six List A matches here in the Benson & Hedges Cup from 1969 to 1998. Only the List A matches played by Norfolk at the ground are recorded in the table.)	431	13	0	12 August 1895 v Cambridgeshire	10 August 2000 v Cheshire	
Wellesley Recreation Ground	Great Yarmouth	0	2	0	0	27 July 1898 v Northumberland	14 August 1899 v Durham	
King Edward VII Grammar School Ground	Kings Lynn	0	7	0	0	9 August 1909 v Cambridgeshire	11 August 1948 v Buckinghamshire	
Recreation Ground	Hunstanton	0	10	0	0	23 July 1924 v Surrey Second XI	23 July 1957 v Kent Second XI	
Hall Road	Barton Turf	0	1	0	0	16 August 1978 v Lancashire Second XI		
Norwich Union Ground, Pinebanks	Norwich	0	0	4	0	12 June 1983 v Berkshire	28 June 1987 v Cambridgeshire	
The Common	Swardeston	0	0	3	0	2 June 1986 v Lincolnshire	17 June 1990 v Lincolnshire	
The Green	North Runcton	0	3	0	0	17 July 1989 v Cumberland	27 August 1995 v Suffolk	
Ferry Lane	Postwick	0	0	1	0	19 May 1991 v Suffolk		
Manor Park	Horsford	5	65	43	16 (Note: Manor Park was used as the venue for the 2024 National Counties T20 Group 2 Super 12 playoffs in 2024. This included one match played between Staffordshire and Hertfordshire. Only matches played by Norfolk are included in the count.)	8 June 1986 v Suffolk	18 August 2024 v Cambridgeshire	
Highfield Lawn	Fakenham	0	0	2	0	22 May 2016 v Cumberland	27 April 2025 v Suffolk	
Barker's Lane	Sprowston	0	2	2	6	5 May 2024 v Suffolk	27 July 2025 v Northumberland	
Walcis Park	Great Witchingham	0	0	3	0	9 June 2024 v Shropshire	4 August 2024 v Cambridgeshire	
