= Hatton Park, Wellingborough =

Former cricket ground in Wellingborough, England

Coordinates: 52.30702°N 0.70362°W

Hatton Park
Ground information
- Location: Wellingborough, Northamptonshire
- Establishment: 1873 (first recorded match)

Team information
United North of England Eleven	(1874)
- As of 1 September 2010; Source: Ground profile

Hatton Park was a cricket ground in Wellingborough, Northamptonshire. The first recorded match on the ground was in 1873, when Wellingborough played a United North of England Eleven. It was a United North of England Eleven that played a United South of England Eleven in the grounds only first-class match. The final recorded match held on the ground came in 1884 when Northamptonshire played Essex.
