= R. Cotton's Ground, Newmarket =

Cricket ground in Newmarket, Suffolk, England

R. Cotton's Ground
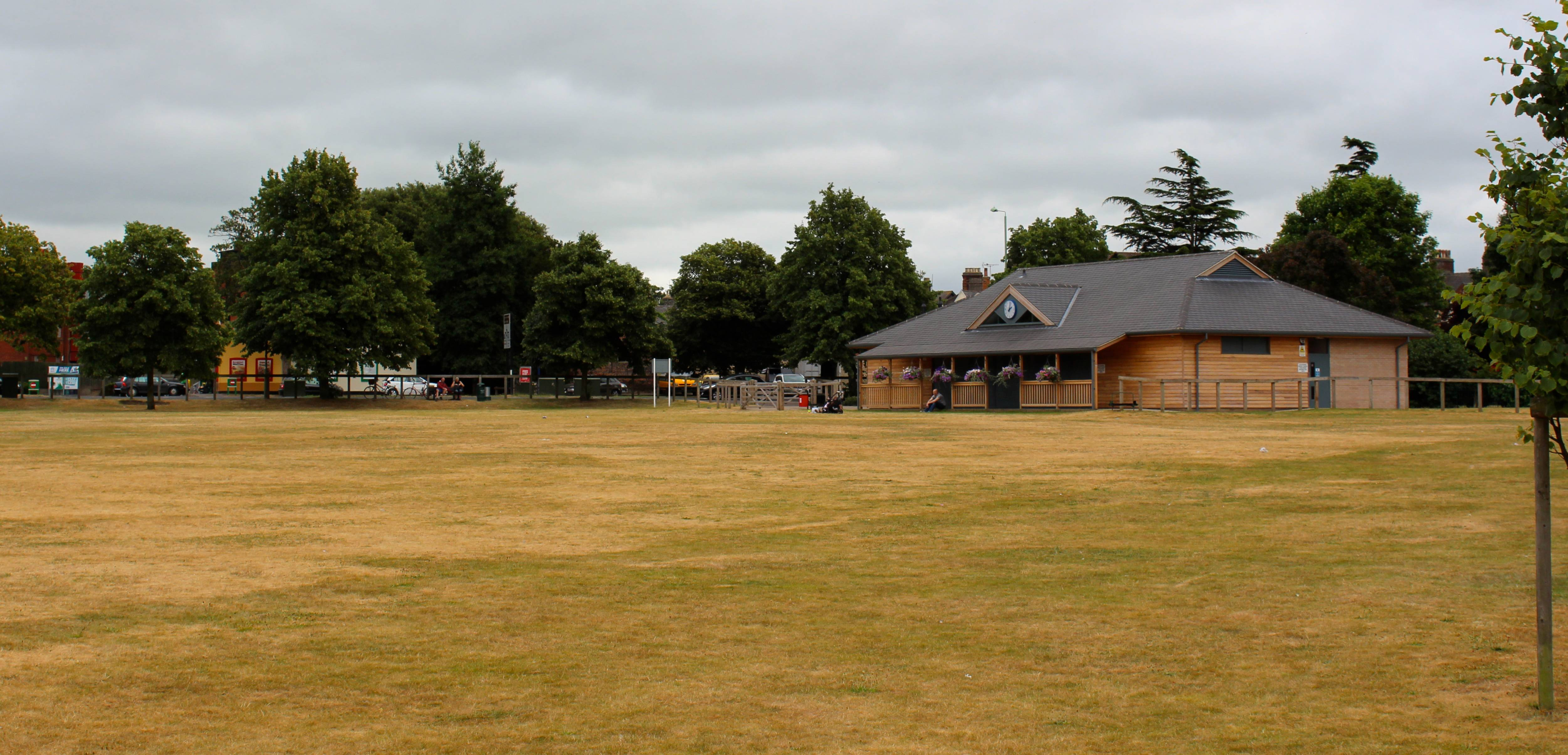
- Interactive map of R. Cotton's Ground

Ground information
- Location: Newmarket, Suffolk
- Country: England
- Coordinates: 52.247°N 0.410°E
- Establishment: 1864 (first recorded match)

Team information
Cambridgeshire and Yorkshire	(1864)
Cambridgeshire	(1908–1911)
- As of 21 August 2010; Source: Ground profile

R. Cotton's Ground, known today as The Severals, is a cricket ground in Newmarket, Suffolk. (Note: Newmarket has historically been split between Suffolk and Cambridgeshire with the county border running through the town until 1889 when it became part of West Suffolk County Council.) The first recorded match on the ground was in 1864, when a combined Cambridge and Yorkshire team played a combined Kent and Nottinghamshire team in the ground's only first-class match. The first Minor Counties Championship match held on the ground was in 1908, when Cambridgeshire played Suffolk. From 1908 to 1911, the ground hosted four Minor Counties Championship matches, with the final Minor Counties fixture seeing Cambridgeshire entertain Suffolk.

Known today as The Severals Sports Ground, it is the home ground of Newmarket Cricket Club which was formed in 2020. The club has four senior sides, with the First XI competing in the Cambridgeshire and Huntingdonshire Premier Division 1 in the 2022 season, one league below the East Anglian Premier League.
