= Baker Perkins Sports Ground =

Cricket ground in England

Coordinates: 52.58824°N 0.24453°W

Ground information
- Location: Peterborough, Northamptonshire
- Establishment: 1963 (first recorded match)

Team information
Northamptonshire	(1967-1964)
- As of 1 September 2010; Source: Ground profile

Baker Perkins Sports Ground is a cricket ground in Peterborough, Northamptonshire. The ground was originally owned by Baker Perkins. The first recorded match on the ground was in 1963, when the Northamptonshire Second XI played the Worcestershire Second XI in the Second XI Championship. The ground of 8 Northamptonshire Second XI fixtures in both the Second XI Championship and Second XI Trophy.

Northamptonshire first played first-class cricket at the ground in 1967 when it played Kent in the County Championship. The ground held 2 further first-class matches, in 1968 when Northamptonshire played Leicestershire and in 1969 when Northamptonshire played Warwickshire.

In 1969, the ground held its first List-A match when Northamptonshire played Lancashire in the Player's County League. Between 1969 and 1974, the ground held 5 List-A matches, the last of which saw Northamptonshire play Warwickshire in the 1974 John Player Special League.

The last recorded match on the ground came in 2002 when Perkins played Wroxeter and Uppington. The ground is no longer used for cricket and is now covered by a residential carehome and housing.
