= List of Hertfordshire County Cricket Club grounds =

Hertfordshire County Cricket Club was established on 8 March 1876. It has since played minor counties cricket from 1895 and played List A cricket from 1964 to 2004, using a different number of home grounds during that time. Their first home minor counties fixture in 1895 was against Norfolk at Cricketfield Lane, Bishop's Stortford, while their first home List A match came 71 years later against Berkshire in the 1966 Gillette Cup at the Lucas Lane, Hitchin.

The 24 grounds that Hertfordshire have used for home matches since 1895 are listed below, with statistics complete through to the end of the 2014 season.

== Grounds ==
=== List A ===
Below is a complete list of grounds used by Hertfordshire County Cricket Club when it was permitted to play List A matches. These grounds have also held Minor Counties Championship and MCCA Knockout Trophy matches.

Name	Location	First	Last	Matches	First	Last	Matches	First	Last	Matches	Refs
Name	Location	List A			Minor Counties Championship			MCCA Trophy			Refs
Lucas Lane	Hitchin	30 April 1966 v Berkshire	28 June 1989 v Nottinghamshire	8	24 July 1908 v Cambridgeshire	9 August 1998 v Lincolnshire	38	16 June 1991 v Norfolk	4 July 1993 v Staffordshire	2	
Ditchmore Lane	Stevenage	only match: 10 May 1969 v Devon		1	29 July 1921 v Buckinghamshire	20 August 2000 v Cambridgeshire	41	4 June 1989 v Oxfordshire	19 May 1991 v Berkshire	2	
Clarence Park	St Albans	4 July 1984 v Somerset	27 July 1990 v Warwickshire	2	14 August 1895 v Bedfordshire	17 June 1997 v Northumberland	87	2 July 1986 v Norfolk	30 June 1991 v Devon	2	
Brunton Memorial Ground	Radlett	4 May 1999 v Leicestershire Cricket Board	3 June 1999 v Lancashire	2	2 July 1975 v Cambridgeshire	10 June 2007 v Lincolnshire	6	17 May 2006 v Cheshire	19 May 2013 v Oxfordshire	2	(Note: Middlesex played a single List A match here in the 2013 Yorkshire Bank 40 against Yorkshire.)
Balls Park	Hertford	19 May 1999 v Sussex Cricket Board	27 June 2001 v Worcestershire	2	8 July 1901 v Cambridgeshire	8 June 2014 v Cambridgeshire	75	10 June 2000 v Suffolk	25 June 2000 v Essex Cricket Board	2	
Digswell Park	Welwyn Garden City	20 May 2000 v Cambridgeshire	29 August 2001 v Staffordshire	3	only match: 30 June 2002 v Cambridgeshire		1	6 July 2003 v Cheshire	22 April 2012 v Devon	7	
Cricketfield Lane	Bishop's Stortford	only match: 28 August 2003 v Ireland		1	25 July 1895 v Norfolk	10 June 2012 v Bedfordshire	56	12 June 1983 v Cheshire	5 May 2002 v Suffolk	6	(Note: A single first-class cricket match was played here in June 1872 between a United South of England Eleven versus a United North of England Eleven.)

=== Minor Counties ===
Below is a complete list of grounds used by Hertfordshire County Cricket Club in Minor Counties Championship and MCCA Knockout Trophy matches.

Name	Location	First	Last	Matches	First	Last	Matches	Refs
Name	Location	Minor Counties Championship			MCCA Trophy			Refs
Park Avenue	Watford	28 July 1895 v Worcestershire	3 July 1974 v Cambridgeshire	77	31 May 1987 v Bedfordshire	24 June 2001 v Huntingdonshire	2	
Broxbourne Sports Club Ground	Broxbourne	8 July 1902 v Dorset	3 July 1935 v Norfolk	11	–	–	0	
Manor House Ground	Bushey	26 June 1911 v Bedfordshire	17 July 1914 v Norfolk	4	–	–	0	
Albury Ride	Cheshunt	19 July 1920 v Norfolk	20 August 1978 v Suffolk	8	–	–	0	
Crossman's Ground	near Barkway	27 July 1925 v Norfolk	6 June 1937 v Norfolk	13	–	–	0	
Porters Park	Radlett	5 July 1929 v Berkshire	1 August 1934 v Buckinghamshire	3	3 July 1984 v Cornwall	13 July 2014 v Cheshire	7	
Letchworth Corner	Letchworth	19 June 1935 v Hertfordshire	16 August 1992 v Suffolk	23	–	–	0	
Hyde Hall	Sawbridgeworth	only match: 27 June 1938 v Norfolk		1	–	–	0	
Durrants Sports Ground	Croxley Green	27 August 1954 v Norfolk	15 August 1982 v Suffolk	5	16 June 1985 v Shropshire	22 June 1986 v Berkshire	2	
London Road	Tring	26 August 1959 v Buckinghamshire	6 June 1999 v Norfolk	12	only match: 5 June 1988 v Buckinghamshire		1	(Note: Northamptonshire played List A matches here from 1974–1991. Buckinghamshire have played four Minor Counties Championship matches and two MCCA Knockout Trophy matches here. Only the matches played by Hertfordshire in these competitions at the ground is recorded in the table.)
Barnet Lane	Barnet	16 August 1961 v Suffolk	16 August 1963 v Suffolk	2	–	–	0	
County Hall Ground	Hertford	only match: 17 July 1968 v Norfolk		1	–	–	0	
Woodside	Watford	20 June 1976 v Norfolk	11 June 1991 v Cumberland	11	only match: 19 May 1985 v Bedfordshire		1	(Note: The ground has played host to a number of teams in List A matches. Minor Counties West played two matches there in the 1977 and 1978 Benson & Hedges Cup, while Minor Counties South played there in the 1979 Benson & Hedges Cup. A combined Minor Counties cricket team played here in the 1980 Benson & Hedges Cup, before Middlesex played here against the touring Sri Lankans in 1981.)
The Walk	Potters Bar	18 August 1987 v Cumberland	4 August 1991 v Cambridgeshire	3	2 June 1985 v Norfolk	8 June 1986 v Bedfordshire	2	
Denis Compton Oval	Shenley	17 July 1995 v Staffordshire	11 July 1999 v Northumberland	5	6 June 1993 v Oxfordshire	4 June 2000 v Middlesex Cricket Board	8	(Note: Six first-class cricket matches have been played here between 1996 and 1994. The Marylebone Cricket Club played three matches at the ground, while Middlesex played two matches against the touring Sri Lankans and Zimbabweans respectively in 2002 and 2003. The sixth first-class match held there saw Sri Lanka A play the touring West Indians. Four List A matches were played here between 1996 and 2004, with the Marylebone Cricket Club playing the touring Pakistanis in 1996, with the other three matches seeing Middlesex as the home team. The Middlesex Cricket Board and Northamptonshire Cricket Board have both played one MCCA Knockout Trophy match here apiece. Only the MCCA Knockout Trophy matches played by Hertfordshire at the ground are recorded in the table. Both Women's Test cricket and Women's One Day International cricket matches have been played here by the England national women's cricket team.)
Marlins	Long Marston	21 August 1994 v Suffolk	3 August 2014 v Cumberland	19	13 May 2007 v Oxfordshire	1 June 2008 v Northumberland	2	
The Common	Harpenden	4 August 2013 v Staffordshire	6 July 2014 v Norfolk	2	3 June 2001 v Middlesex Cricket Board	25 May 2014 v Norfolk	9	
Home Farm	North Mymms	–	–	0	2 June 2006 v Buckinghamshire	13 May 2012 v Cornwall	5	
Whitehorn Lane	Letchworth	–	–	0	only match: 25 April 2010 v Dorset		1	
