= List of Shropshire County Cricket Club grounds =

Shropshire County Cricket Club was established on 28 June 1956. It has since played minor counties cricket from 1957 and played List A cricket from 1974 to 2005, using a different number of home grounds during that time. Their first home minor counties fixture in 1957 was against Staffordshire at The Grove Ground, Market Drayton, while their first List A match came 17 years later against Essex in the 1974 Gillette Cup at Orleton Park, Wellington.

The sixteen grounds that Shropshire have used for home matches since 1955 are listed below, with statistics complete through to the end of the 2014 season.

== Grounds ==
=== List A ===
Below is a complete list of grounds used by Shropshire County Cricket Club when it was permitted to play List A matches. These grounds have also held Minor Counties Championship and MCCA Knockout Trophy matches.

Name	Location	First	Last	Matches	First	Last	Matches	First	Last	Matches	Refs
Name	Location	List A			Minor Counties Championship			MCCA Trophy			Refs
Orleton Park	Wellington	29 June 1974 v Essex	19 May 1999 v Hampshire Cricket Board	8	16 August 1965 v Bedfordshire	10 June 2001 v Berkshire	36	22 May 1994 v Bedfordshire	19 June 2011 v Cambridgeshire	5	(Note: One first-class match has been played here between a Minor Counties cricket team and the touring Indians on 18 July 1979.)
St George's Cricket Ground	Telford	4 July 1984 v Yorkshire	21 June 2000 v Somerset	7	17 July 1957 v Derbyshire Second XI	4 July 1999 v Devon	20	9 June 1996 v Berkshire	19 July 2001 v Devon	3	
London Road	Shrewsbury	1 May 2001 v Devon	29 May 2002 v Gloucestershire	2	4 July 1957 v Nottinghamshire Second XI	21 July 2013 v Cornwall	41	1 May 1995 v Dorset	4 May 2014 v Lincolnshire	12	(Note: Two List A matches were played here in the 1984 and 1985 Benson & Hedges Cup by a combined Minor Counties team. Only the List A matches played by Shropshire at the ground are recorded in the table.)
Priorslee Road	Shifnal	16 May 2000 v Surrey Cricket Board	13 September 2001 v Oxfordshire	3	10 June 1987 v Cornwall	22 June 2014 v Herefordshire	15	17 May 1998 v Lancashire Cricket Board	16 June 2013 v Wales Minor Counties	5	
Morda Road	Oswestry	only match: 28 August 2003 v Northumberland		1	16 July 1964 v Somerset Second XI	5 August 2012 v Wales Minor Counties	20	28 May 2000 v Worcestershire Cricket Board	18 May 2014 v Cheshire	9	
Heath Road	Whitchurch	only match: 4 May 2005 v Hampshire		1	23 July 2000 v Herefordshire	6 June 2016 v Dorset	14	only match: 20 June 1999 v Cumberland		1	

=== Minor Counties ===
Below is a complete list of grounds used by Shropshire County Cricket Club in Minor Counties Championship and MCCA Knockout Trophy matches.

Name	Location	First	Last	Matches	First	Last	Matches	Refs
Name	Location	Minor Counties Championship			MCCA Trophy			Refs
Grove Ground	Market Drayton	29 May 1957 v Staffordshire	21 August 1976 v Dorset	14	–	–	0	
Audley Avenue	Newport	11 July 1957 v Warwickshire Second XI	5 July 1998 v Wales Minor Counties	14	3 June 1984 v Berkshire	17 June 1984 v Northumberland	2	
High Town	Bridgnorth	30 July 1958 v Derbyshire Second XI	16 July 2014 v Oxfordshire	49	19 May 1985 v Oxfordshire	20 May 1990 v Staffordshire	3	
Perkins Cricket Club Ground	Shrewsbury	24 August 1959 v Nottinghamshire Second XI	5 July 1965 v Somerset Second XI	7	5 June 1988 v Cheshire	17 May 1992 v Herefordshire	4	
Ellesmere College Ground	Ellesmere	14 June 1967 v Lincolnshire	12 June 1994 v Wiltshire	4	–	–	0	
The Avenue	Uppington	2 June 1971 v Cambridgeshire	3 June 1975 v Somerset Second XI	3	only match: 8 June 2003 v Cumberland		1	
The Burway	Ludlow	27 August 1973 v Devon	19 August 1979 v Somerset Second XI	6	–	–	0	
Sir John Moore Barracks Ground	Shrewsbury	only match: 21 August 1974 v Staffordshire		1	–	–	0	
Wrekin College Ground	Wellington	–	–	0	only match: 24 May 1998 v Cheshire		1	
The Kynaston Ground	Wem	–	–	0	3 June 2001 v Wales Minor Counties	17 May 2009 v Cheshire	3	
