= List of Devon County Cricket Club grounds =

Devon County Cricket Club was established on 26 November 1899. It has since played minor counties cricket from 1901 and played List A cricket from 1969 to 2005, using a different number of home grounds during that time. Their first home minor counties fixture in 1901 was against Wiltshire at Gras Lawn, Exeter, while their first home List A match came 77 years later against Staffordshire in the 1978 Gillette Cup at the Recreation Ground, Torquay.

The twenty grounds that Devon have used for home matches since 1901 are listed below, with statistics complete through to the end of the 2014 season.

== Grounds ==
=== List A ===
Below is a complete list of grounds used by Devon County Cricket Club when it was permitted to play List A matches. These grounds have also held Minor Counties Championship and MCCA Knockout Trophy matches.

| Name | Location | First | Last | Matches | First | Last | Matches | First | Last | Matches | Refs |
| Name | Location | List A | | | Minor Counties Championship | | | MCCA Trophy | | | Refs |
|---|---|---|---|---|---|---|---|---|---|---|---|
| Recreation Ground | Torquay | 5 July 1978 v Staffordshire | 8 June 2014 v Cheshire | 5 | 19 August 1932 v Surrey Second XI | 10 July 2011 v Cheshire | 68 | 12 June 1983 v Buckinghamshire | 10 June 2004 v Suffolk | 9 | (Note: Twelve first-class cricket matches have been played on the ground: firstly during the 1950s the ground was used by the South of England cricket team in the North v South fixture on five occasions, and the ground also saw use by an England XI against the Commonwealth XI cricket team on four occasions during the same period. A combined Minor Counties cricket team later played three first-class matches there against touring international sides in the 1970s. Somerset played five List A matches there between 1969 and 1975. Minor Counties West also played one List A match here in the 1974 Benson & Hedges Cup. Only the List A matches played by Devon at the ground are recorded in the table.) |
| County Ground, Exeter | Exeter | only match: 2 July 1980 v Cornwall | | 1 | 8 August 1902 v Wiltshire | 3 August 2014 v Shropshire | 149 | 17 June 1984 v Oxfordshire | 9 May 2010 v Wales Minor Counties | 2 | (Note: Two first-class cricket matches have been played at the ground. The first was between the West of England cricket team and the touring New Zealanders in 1927; the second was between a combined Minor Counties cricket team and the touring West Indians in 1928.) |
| The Maer Ground | Exmouth | 25 June 1986 v Nottinghamshire | 3 May 2005 v Essex | 16 | 3 August 1951 v Berkshire | 17 August 2014 v Berkshire | 54 | 2 June 1991 v Wiltshire | 13 June 2010 v Hertfordshire | 8 | (Note: The Unicorns cricket team also played two List A matches at the ground in the 2010 and 2011 Clydesdale Bank 40. Only the List A matches played by Devon at the ground are recorded in the table.) |

=== Minor Counties ===
Below is a complete list of grounds used by Devon County Cricket Club in Minor Counties Championship and MCCA Knockout Trophy matches.

| Name | Location | First | Last | Matches | First | Last | Matches | Refs |
| Name | Location | Minor Counties Championship | | | MCCA Trophy | | | Refs |
|---|---|---|---|---|---|---|---|---|
| Gras Lawn | Exeter | 9 August 1901 v Wiltshire | 30 August 1901 v Glamorgan | 4 | – | – | 0 | |
| United Services Ground | Plymouth | 11 July 1904 v Cornwall | 29 July 2001 v Oxfordshire | 17 | – | – | 0 | |
| Kelly College Ground | Tavistock | 13 July 1906 v Cornwall | 23 July 1913 v Berkshire | 4 | – | – | 0 | |
| Cricketfield Road | Torquay | only match: 4 August 1909 v Carmarthenshire | | 1 | – | – | 0 | |
| Fortfield Road | Sidmouth | 13 July 1914 v Monmouthshire | 6 July 2014 v Cheshire | 39 | 3 July 1984 v Cornwall | 13 July 2014 v Cheshire | 7 | |
| The Newton Abbot and District Recreational Ground | Newton Abbot | 22 July 1925 v Monmouthshire | 23 July 1985 v Berkshire | 12 | – | – | 0 | |
| Peverell Park | Plymouth | 20 August 1926 v Cornwall | 23 July 1975 v Berkshire | 20 | – | – | 0 | |
| Sandhills | Instow | 18 August 1933 v Surrey Second XI | 17 August 2008 v Shropshire | 18 | 22 June 1986 v Durham | 27 April 2014 v Wiltshire | 9 | |
| Blundell's School | Tiverton | 4 August 1947 v Dorset | 22 August 1969 v Oxfordshire | 3 | only match: 18 June 1989 v Dorset | | 1 | |
| Queen's Park | Paignton | 5 August 1949 v Dorset | 18 August 1976 v Cornwall | 16 | – | – | 0 | |
| Court Lane | Seaton | 6 August 1951 v Dorset | 31 July 1967 v Somerset Second XI | 8 | – | – | 0 | |
| Pilton Ground | Barnstaple | only match: 23 July 1954 v Cornwall | | 1 | – | – | 0 | |
| St Thomas Cricket Club Ground | Exeter | 28 July 1965 v Berkshire | 23 August 1972 v Oxfordshire | 7 | – | – | 0 | |
| The Ring | Tavistock | only match: 22 July 1976 v Dorset | | 1 | – | – | 0 | |
| Kate Brook | Chudleigh | 1 August 1978 v Dorset | 31 July 1979 v Dorset | 2 | – | – | 0 | |
| Recreation Ground | Bovey Tracey | 26 August 1980 v Cornwall | 24 July 2007 v Wiltshire | 27 | 2 June 1985 v Wiltshire | 21 April 2013 v Oxfordshire | 9 | |
| Ottermouth | Budleigh Salterton | 26 May 1996 v Dorset | 5 August 2007 v Cornwall | 4 | 10 May 1998 v Dorset | 18 May 2008 v Herefordshire | 3 | |
| The War Memorial Playing Fields | Chagford | – | – | 0 | only match: 21 June 1998 v Cornwall | | 1 | |
