= Midhurst Cricket Ground =

Sports ground in Sussex, England

Coordinates: 50.98727°N 0.73852°W

- Interactive map of Midhurst Cricket Ground

Ground information
- Location: Midhurst, Sussex
- Country: England
- Establishment: 1830 (first recorded match)

Team information
Sussex	(1830)
- As of 26 August 2010; Source: Ground profile

Midhurst Cricket Ground (exact name and location unknown) was a cricket ground in Midhurst, Sussex. The first recorded match on the ground was in 1830, when a Sussex team played the only first-class match at the ground against a side representing Surrey. The final recorded match on the ground came in 1866 when Midhurst played a United All-England Eleven.
