= Spicer's Sports Ground =

Cricket ground in Sawston, Cambridgeshire, England

Coordinates: 52.12729°N 0.16627°E

Spicers Sports Ground
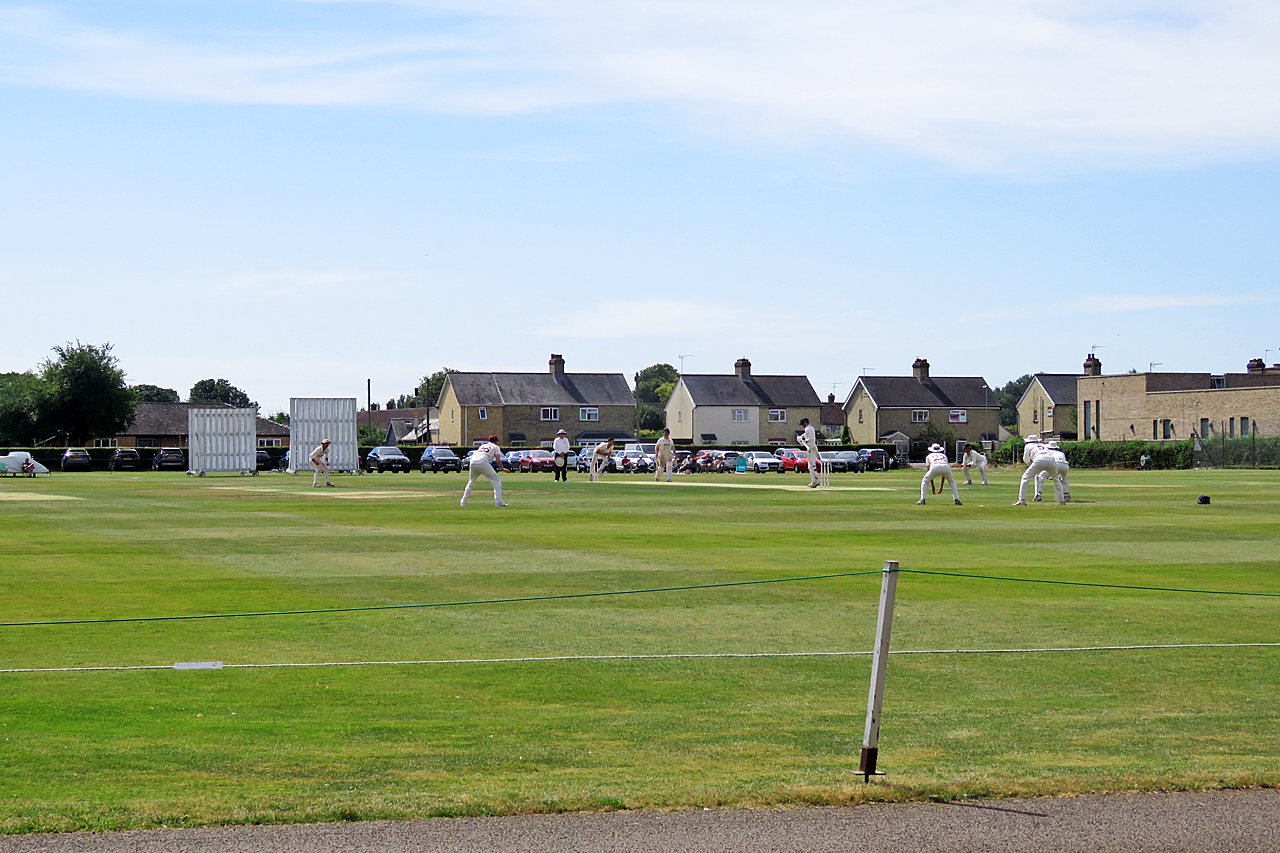

Ground information
- Location: Sawston, Cambridgeshire
- Establishment: 1950 (first recorded match)

Team information
Cambridgeshire	(1951-1967)
- As of 21 August 2010; Source: Ground profile

Spicers Sports Ground is a cricket ground in Sawston, Cambridgeshire. The first recorded match on the ground was in 1950, when Cambridgeshire played Huntingdonshire. The first Minor Counties Championship match held on the ground was in 1951, when Cambridgeshire played Hertfordshire. From 1951 to 1967, the ground hosted 16 Minor Counties Championship matches, with the final Minor Counties fixture seeing Cambridgeshire entertain Hertfordshire.

The ground has also held a single List-A match when Cambridgeshire played Essex in the 1964 Gillette Cup. This match was Cambridgeshire's first List-A match.

In local domestic cricket, the ground is the home venue of Sawston Cricket Club who play in the Tucker Gardner Cambridgeshire and Huntingdonshire Cricket League First Division.
