= List of Bedfordshire County Cricket Club grounds =

Bedfordshire County Cricket Club was established on 3 November 1899. Prior to that a county club had existed, with the team competing in the first Minor Counties Championship in 1895. The newly established team has competed in the Minor Counties Championship since 1900, in the Minor Counties Trophy since it was established in 1983, and in the Minor Counties Twenty20 Competition sine its establishment in 2015. (Note: The Minor Counties were renamed the National Counties ahead of the 2020 cricket season.) It also played List A cricket between 1967 and 2005. The county has used a number of home grounds during this period.

The county's first home minor counties fixture in 1895 was against Hertfordshire at Bedford School. Their first home List A match came 72 years later against Northamptonshire in the 1967 Gillette Cup at Wardown Park, Luton. The team have played the majority of their minor counties fixtures at Bedford School and Wardown Park.

== Grounds ==
The 18 grounds that Bedfordshire have used for home matches since 1895 are listed below.

As of 20 September 2025

Name	Location	List A	NCCA Champ	NCCA Trophy	NCCA T20	First match	Last match	Refs
Bedford School Ground	Bedford	0 (Note: Northants played two List A fixtures on the ground, one in 1971 and one in 1982. The county has also played Second XI matches on the ground.)	183	6	2	5 August 1895 v Hertfordshire	23 July 2023 v Northumberland	
Dunstable Grammar School Ground	Dunstable	0	6	0	0	16 August 1895 v Wiltshire	27 June 1905 v Northumberland	
Bell Close	Leighton Buzzard	0	5	0	0	21 August 1895 v Buckinghamshire	31 July 1994 v Cumberland	
Bedford County School Ground	Bedford	0	13	0	0	21 June 1900 v Staffordshire	24 June 1914 v Suffolk	
Luton Hoo Park	Luton	0	2	0	0	17 August 1900 v Oxfordshire	9 August 1901 v Oxfordshire	
Bedford Modern School Ground	Bedford	0 (Note: Women's Twenty20 cricket has been played on the ground.)	13	1	0	10 June 1901 v Surrey Second XI	7 July 2019 v Hertfordshire	
Wardown Park	Luton	13 (Note: Northants played 11 first-class, 24 List A, and one Twenty20 match on the ground between 1973 and 2004. The Minor Counties cricket team played a single List A match on the ground in 1998, with Northants as the opposition and a women's first-class match was played on the ground in 1963. The ground has also been used by Northants, Minor Counties under-25s, and Unicorns for Second XI cricket.)	131 (Note: The Minor County Championship final was held on the ground three times, in 1990, 1991 and 1997. The 1997 final saw Bedfordshire play as the home team. This match is included in the count.)	7	2	6 August 1906 v Buckinghamshire	29 June 2025 v Oxfordshire	
Goldington Bury	Bedford	3 (Note: Minor Counties South also played a List A match on the ground in 1975.)	33	3	0	30 July 1913 v Buckinghamshire	27 July 2003 v Northumberland	
WH Allen's Sports Ground	Biddenham	0	1	0	0	21 July 1920 v Norfolk	–	
Goldington Road	Bedford	0	2	0	0	1 June 1925 v Kent Second XI	9 June 1930 v Buckinghamshire	
Southill Park	Southill	0 (Note: Women\s List A cricket has been played on the ground.)	20	8	2	22 July 1972 v Hertfordshire	25 May 2025 v Wales National Counties	
Bull Pond Lane	Dunstable	0	15	0	0	24 July 1972 v Shropshire	9 June 1991 v Staffordshire	
Vauxhall Motors Ground	Luton	0	3	0	0	15 July 1973 v Cambridgeshire	12 July 1975 v Cambridgeshire	
The Pyghties	Henlow	0	22	1	0	23 July 1973 v Shropshire	5 July 1998 v Northumberland	
Grange Lane	Cople	0	0	4	1 (Note: The only Twenty20 match played on the ground was a 2015 play off match between Bedfordshire and Cambridgeshire.)	19 May 1991 v Buckinghamshire	28 June 2015 v Cambridgeshire	
Lancot Park	Totternhoe	1 (Note: Women's Twenty20 cricket has been played on the ground which has also been used for Second XI cricket by Northants and Minor Counties under-25.)	17	15	8	17 July 1994 v Northumberland	20 July 2025 v Cumbria	
The Vale	Westoning	0	11	4	0	4 June 2000 v Northumberland	10 August 2025 v Norfolk	
Ampthill Park	Ampthill	0	2	9	7	14 May 2006 v Lincolnshire	6 May 2024 v Berkshire	
