= Chatteris Cricket Ground =

Cricket venue in Cambridgeshire, England

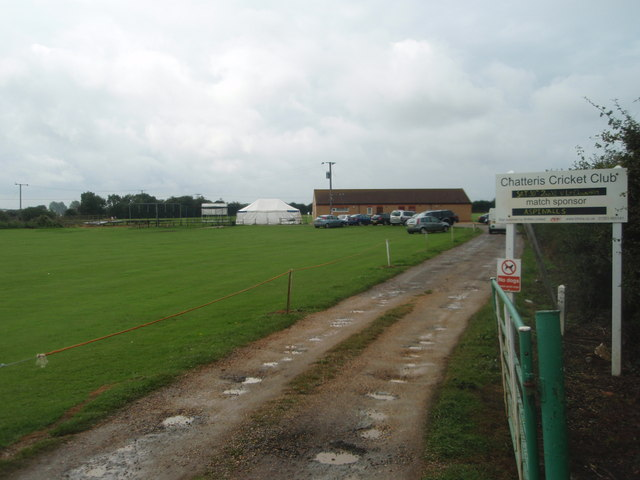

Ground information
- Location: Chatteris, Cambridgeshire
- Establishment: 1832 (first recorded match)

Team information
Cambridge Town Club	(1832)
Cambridgeshire	(1967-1971)
- As of 21 August 2010; Source: Ground profile

Chatteris Cricket Ground is a cricket ground in Chatteris, Cambridgeshire. The first recorded match on the ground was in 1832, when Cambridge Town Club played the Marylebone Cricket Club in the ground's only first-class match. The ground was first used for Minor Counties Championship cricket when Cambridgeshire played Lincolnshire in 1967. From 1967 to 1971, the ground hosted 4 Minor Counties Championship matches, the last of which saw Cambridgeshire play Bedfordshire Chatteris CC was formed in 1879 and it is uncertain if the field used in 1832 is the same one currently used by the town club in Wenny Road.
