= Thames Board Mills Sports Ground =

Sports ground in Purfleet, Essex

Coordinates: 51.4946°N 0.2361°E

- Interactive map of Thames Board Mills Sports Ground

Ground information
- Location: Purfleet, Essex
- Country: England
- Establishment: 1956 (first recorded match)

Team information
Essex	(1969–1972)
- As of 12 September 2010; Source: Ground profile

Thames Board Mills Sports Ground was a cricket, football and rugby ground in Purfleet, Essex. The first recorded match on the ground was in 1956, when the Essex Second XI played the Surrey Second XI in the Minor Counties Championship.

Essex played their first List-A match there against Kent in the 1969 Player's County League. Essex played 4 List-A matches there between 1969 and 1972, playing their final List-A match there against Glamorgan in the 1972 John Player League.

Thames Board Mills rugby club started there and was based there for many years.

The ground is no longer used for cricket, but is used for football. East Thurrock United played at the ground from 1982 to 1984. The ground was previously owned by the London Fire Brigade, but is today owned by a private social club which retains its link to the Fire Brigade. There has also been speculation about Grays Athletic F.C. building their new ground there.
