= List of Berkshire County Cricket Club grounds =

Berkshire County Cricket Club was established on 17 March 1895. It has since played minor counties cricket from 1895 and played List A cricket from 1965 to 2005, using a different number of home grounds during that time. Their first home minor counties fixture in 1895 was against Hertfordshire at Reading School Ground, while their first home List A match came seventy years later against Somerset in the 1965 Gillette Cup at Church Road, Reading. The now defunct County Ground in Reading has held the most Minor Counties Championship fixtures for Berkshire.

The thirty grounds that Berkshire have used for home matches since 1895 are listed below, with statistics complete through to the end of the 2014 season.

== Grounds ==
=== List A ===
Below is a complete list of grounds used by Berkshire County Cricket Club when it was permitted to play List A matches. These grounds have also held Minor Counties Championship and MCCA Knockout Trophy matches.

Name	Location	First	Last	Matches	First	Last	Matches	First	Last	Matches	Refs
Name	Location	List A			Minor Counties Championship			MCCA Trophy			Refs
Church Road	Reading	28 April 1965 v Somerset	29 June 1983 v Yorkshire	3	11 August 1948 v Hertfordshire	16 August 1983 v Cheshire	41	–	–	0	(Note: A combined Minor Counties cricket team played one first-class match against the touring Sri Lankans in 1981. A combined Minor Counties cricket team also played a single List A match here against Hampshire in the 1985 Benson & Hedges Cup. Only the List A matches played by Berkshire at the ground are recorded in the table.)
Courages Cricket Ground	Reading	only match: 25 June 1986 v Gloucestershire		1	9 August 1975 v Wiltshire	31 July 1983 v Wiltshire	8	only match: 20 May 1984 v Buckinghamshire		1	
Finchampstead Park	Finchampstead	22 June 1988 v Yorkshire	29 August 2002 v Ireland	14	11 June 1982 v Buckinghamshire	20 July 2014 v Herefordshire	31	18 May 1997 v Shropshire	14 July 2013 v Northumberland	8	
Sonning Lane	Reading	26 June 1991 v Hampshire	3 May 2005 v Gloucestershire	6	31 July 1988 v Cornwall	20 August 2006 v Oxfordshire	21	–	–	0	

=== Minor Counties ===
Below is a complete list of grounds used by Berkshire County Cricket Club in Minor Counties Championship and MCCA Knockout Trophy matches.

Name	Location	First	Last	Matches	First	Last	Matches	Refs
Name	Location	Minor Counties Championship			MCCA Trophy			Refs
Reading School Ground	Reading School	20 August 1895 v Hertfordshire	7 July 1996 v Cornwall	19	5 June 1987 v Staffordshire	28 June 1987 v Buckinghamshire	2	
County Ground	Reading	17 August 1896 v Wiltshire	13 August 1986 v Devon	191	–	–	0	
Wargrave Cricket Club Ground	Wargrave	11 August 1922 v Wiltshire	21 August 1925 v Cornwall	3	only match: 11 May 2014 v Staffordshire		1	
HM Martineau's Ground	Holyport	22 June 1927 v Hertfordshire	19 August 1932 v Wiltshire	3	–	–	0	
Sutton's Seeds, Cintra Ground	Reading	22 July 1930 v Oxfordshire	16 August 1954 v Dorset	7	–	–	0	
Royal Ordnance Depot Ground	Didcot	only match: 27 August 1947 v Oxfordshire		1	–	–	0	
Bartholomew's Grammar School Ground	Newbury	23 August 1948 v Dorset	20 July 1973 v Wiltshire	19	–	–	0	
The Brakspear Ground	Remenham	6 August 1952 v Oxfordshire	8 June 2014 v Cornwall	5	27 April 2008 v Herefordshire	22 April 2012 v Wales Minor Counties	6	(Note: Oxfordshire played twelve Minor Counties Championship matches here between 1964–1978. Only the Minor Counties Championship matches played by Berkshire at the ground are recorded in the table.)
Reading University Ground	Reading	14 August 1959 v Devon	29 May 1983 v Shropshire	20	–	–	0	
Atomic Energy Research Establishment Ground	Harwell	3 August 1960 v Oxfordshire	17 August 1964 v Wiltshire	3	–	–	0	
Home Park	Windsor	14 August 1963 v Devon	30 July 1974 v Dorset	10	–	–	0	
Hales Meadow	Abingdon	13 August 1962 v Wiltshire	14 August 1975 v Oxfordshire	7	–	–	0	
Boyne Grove	Maidenhead	7 August 1967 v Buckinghamshire	18 July 1982 v Oxfordshire	8	–	–	0	
Bray Ground	Bray	26 August 1968 v Cornwall	29 May 1994 v Oxfordshire	7	–	–	0	
Royal Military Academy	Sandhurst	only match: 11 August 1972 v Oxfordshire		1	–	–	0	
War Memorial Ground	Hungerford	19 July 1974 v Wiltshire	21 May 2000 v Wales Minor Counties	6	only match: 16 May 1999 v Buckinghamshire		1	
Ibis Cricket Club Ground	Reading	6 August 1977 v Wiltshire	29 July 1981 v Oxfordshire	5	–	–	0	
Gallowstree Common	Kidmore End	2 August 1981 v Cornwall	20 August 1996 v Oxfordshire	15	26 May 2013 v Buckinghamshire	25 May 2014 v Herefordshire	2	
Bradfield College Ground	Bradfield	5 August 1982 v Wiltshire	9 August 1990 v Devon	4	–	–	0	
Large's Lane	Bracknell	11 August 1987 v Cheshire	29 May 1988 v Buckinghamshire	2	2 June 1985 v Shropshire	9 June 1986 v Buckinghamshire	2	
Enborne Lodge	Newbury	2 July 1985 v Wiltshire	6 July 2014 v Wiltshire	34	19 June 1994 v Buckinghamshire	16 June 2013 v Cornwall	8	
Wellington College Ground	Crowthorne	–	–	0	only match: 3 June 1990 v Buckinghamshire		1	
Wokingham Road	Hurst	23 June 1996 v Wales Minor Counties	2 July 2010 v Cornwall	5	31 May 1987 v Oxfordshire	21 May 2001 v Sussex Cricket Board	2	
Chalvey Road	Slough	–	–	0	only match: 9 June 1999 v Sussex Cricket Board		1	(Note: Buckinghamshire have played Minor Counties Championship matches here between 1904–1998, as well as a single MCCA Knockout Trophy match against Oxfordshire in 1992. Only the MCCA Knockout Trophy match played by Berkshire at the ground is recorded in the table.)
Browns Sports Field	Thatcham	–	–	0	4 June 2000 v Sussex Cricket Board	29 April 2007 v Wales Minor Counties	5	
The Memorial Ground	Burnham	–	–	0	only match: 5 May 2013 v Dorset		1	(Note: The Memorial Ground is located in the adjacent county of Buckinghamshire. Buckinghamshire have played Minor Counties Championship matches here from 2006 onward, as well as a single MCCA Knockout Trophy match against Herefordshire in 2014. Only the MCCA Knockout Trophy match played by Berkshire at the ground is recorded in the table.)
