= Walton Lea Road =

Cricket ground in England

Coordinates: 53.3638°N 2.5970°W

- Interactive map of Walton Lea Road

Ground information
- Location: Warrington, Cheshire, England
- Country: England
- Establishment: 1881 (first recorded match)

International information
- Only women's ODI: 20 July 1993: Australia v Netherlands

Team information
Cheshire	(1982-1998 & 2001-2002)
- As of 6 September 2020; Source: Ground profile

Walton Lea Road is a cricket ground in Warrington. The first recorded match on the ground was in 1881, when Warrington played Huyton.

The first Minor Counties Championship match held on the ground came in 1978 when Cheshire played the Lancashire Second XI. From 1978 to 1994, the ground hosted 9 Minor Counties Championship matches, with the final Minor Counties Championship fixture held on the ground coming in 1994 when Cheshire played Berkshire. Additionally, between 1986 and 1996, the ground held 5 MCCA Knockout Trophy matches, the last of which saw Cheshire play Hertfordshire.

The ground has also hosted a single List-A match between Cheshire and Nottinghamshire in the 1st round of the 1993 NatWest Trophy.

During the 1993 Women's Cricket World Cup the ground held a single Women's One Day International between Australia women and the Netherlands.

In local domestic cricket, the ground is the home venue of Warrington Cricket Club.
