= 1989 Refuge Assurance League =

- Administrator(s): Test and County Cricket Board
- Cricket format: Limited overs cricket (40 overs per innings)
- Tournament format(s): League
- Champions: Lancashire (3rd title)
- Participants: 17
- Matches: 136
- Most runs: 691 Alec Stewart (Surrey)
- Most wickets: 29 Kevin Saxelby (Nottinghamshire)

The 1989 Refuge Assurance League was the twenty-first competing of what was generally known as the Sunday League. The competition was won for the third time by Lancashire County Cricket Club.

== Standings ==
| Team | Pld | W | T | L | N/R | A | Pts | R/R |
|---|---|---|---|---|---|---|---|---|
| Lancashire | 16 | 12 | 0 | 2 | 1 | 1 | 52 | 4.722 |
| Worcestershire | 16 | 11 | 0 | 4 | 0 | 1 | 46 | 4.991 |
| Essex | 16 | 11 | 0 | 4 | 1 | 0 | 46 | 4.576 |
| Nottinghamshire | 16 | 9 | 0 | 6 | 0 | 1 | 38 | 4.691 |
| Derbyshire | 16 | 9 | 0 | 6 | 0 | 1 | 38 | 4.257 |
| Hampshire | 16 | 8 | 1 | 6 | 1 | 0 | 36 | 4.339 |
| Northamptonshire | 16 | 8 | 0 | 6 | 1 | 1 | 36 | 4.366 |
| Surrey | 16 | 9 | 0 | 7 | 0 | 0 | 36 | 4.912 |
| Middlesex | 16 | 8 | 1 | 7 | 0 | 0 | 34 | 4.195 |
| Somerset | 16 | 7 | 1 | 8 | 0 | 0 | 30 | 5.030 |
| Kent | 16 | 7 | 0 | 9 | 0 | 0 | 28 | 4.753 |
| Sussex | 16 | 6 | 1 | 8 | 1 | 0 | 28 | 4.751 |
| Yorkshire | 16 | 7 | 0 | 9 | 0 | 0 | 28 | 4.810 |
| Leicestershire | 16 | 5 | 0 | 10 | 0 | 1 | 22 | 4.082 |
| Warwickshire | 16 | 5 | 0 | 10 | 0 | 1 | 22 | 4.730 |
| Glamorgan | 16 | 2 | 0 | 12 | 1 | 1 | 12 | 4.612 |
| Gloucestershire | 16 | 3 | 0 | 13 | 0 | 0 | 12 | 4.342 |
Team marked (C) finished as champions. Source: CricketArchive

== Refuge Assurance Cup ==
Following the end of the Sunday League season, the top four teams in the Sunday League competed for the Refuge Assurance Cup. Essex emerged as victors, defeating Nottinghamshire in the final.

== See also ==
Sunday League
