= List of Glamorgan County Cricket Club grounds =

Glamorgan County Cricket Club was established on 6 July 1888. The county entered the Minor Counties Championship in 1896 and competed in the competition until 1920, after which it was elevated to first-class status for the 1921 season, and has played first-class cricket since. Following their elevation to first-class status, Glamorgan alternated their home matches between Cardiff Arms Park in Cardiff and St Helen's in Swansea. It wasn't until 1966 that Glamorgan began playing at their current home ground, Sophia Gardens in Cardiff. Cardiff Arms Park played host to Glamorgan's first home fixture in first-class cricket against Sussex in 1921, as well as its first home List A fixture against Worcestershire in 1963. Forty years later Sophia Gardens played host to the club's first Twenty20 fixture against Northamptonshire. Glamorgan have played home matches at nineteen grounds, but have played the majority of their home fixtures since 1966 at Sophia Gardens Stadium, which also holds Test, One Day International and Twenty20 International cricket matches.

The nineteen grounds that Glamorgan have used for home matches since 1896 are listed below, with statistics complete through to the end of the 2014 season. A twentieth ground, the Newport International Sports Village (also known as Spytty Park), staged its first County Championship game in May 2019.

== Grounds ==
=== Minor county ===
Below is a complete list of grounds used by Glamorgan County Cricket Club in Minor Counties Championship matches before its elevation to first-class status in 1921.

Name	Location	First	Last	Matches	Refs
Name	Location	Minor Counties Championship			Refs
Cardiff Arms Park	Cardiff	13 July 1896 v Worcestershire	2 August 1920 v Surrey Second XI	59	
St Helen's	Swansea	9 July 1897 v Monmouthshire	20 June 1920 v Cheshire	29	(Note: Wales Minor Counties played Minor Counties Championship matches here. Only the Minor Counties Championship matches played at the ground by Glamorgan are recorded in the table.)
The Gnoll	Neath	24 June 1908 v Carmarthenshire	28 July 1920 v Devon	7	(Note: The Glamorgan Second XI and Wales Minor Counties have each played a Minor Counties Championship match here. Only the Minor Counties Championship matches played at the ground by Glamorgan are recorded in the table.)

=== First-class county ===
Below is a complete list of grounds used by Glamorgan County Cricket Club in first-class, List A and Twenty20 matches following its elevation to first-class status in 1921.

Name	Location	First	Last	Matches	First	Last	Matches	First	Last	Matches	Refs
Name	Location	First-class			List A			Twenty20			Refs
Cardiff Arms Park	Cardiff	18 May 1921 v Sussex	13 August 1966 v Somerset	241	only match: 22 May 1963 v Somerset		1	–	–	0	(Note: The first-class East v West fixture of 1910 was played here, as well as a first-class match between England and The Rest in 1932. Only the first-class matches played at the ground by Glamorgan are recorded in the table.)
St Helen's	Swansea	28 May 1921 v Leicestershire	11 June 2019 v Derbyshire	416	21 May 1966 v Warwickshire	3 June 2018 v Hampshire	142	only match: 25 June 2005 v Warwickshire		1	(Note: South Wales played one first-class match here against the touring South Africans in 1912, while Wales played one first-class match here against Scotland in 1924. Only the first-class matches played at the ground by Glamorgan are recorded in the table. Wales Minor Counties played four List A matches here between 1999–2005. Only the List A matches played at the ground by Glamorgan are recorded in the table.)
Ynysangharad Park	Pontypridd	3 July 1926 v Derbyshire	29 June 1996 v Pakistanis	43	6 September 1970 v Essex	25 July 1999 v Surrey	9	–	–	0	
Cowbridge Ground	Cowbridge	25 July 1931 v Northamptonshire	23 July 1932 v Somerset	10	–	–	0	–	–	0	
Stradey Park	Llanelli	24 June 1933 v Worcestershire	1 September 1965 v Essex	23	28 August 1988 v Leicestershire	11 July 1993 v Sussex	9	–	–	0	(Note: Stradey Park is located in the adjacent county of Carmarthenshire.)
The Gnoll	Neath	14 July 1934 v Essex	8 July 1995 v Young Australia	43	12 June 1963 v Worcestershire	28 August 1994 v Leicestershire	12	–	–	0	
Rodney Parade	Newport	6 July 1935 v Leicestershire	5 May 1965 v Warwickshire	27	25 April 1964 v Worcestershire	7 May 1989 v Gloucestershire	3	–	–	0	(Note: Rodney Parade is located in the adjacent county of Monmouthshire.)
Eugene Cross Park	Ebbw Vale	22 June 1946 v Worcestershire	22 August 1990 v Sri Lankans	25	10 August 1969 v Derbyshire	29 July 2007 v Middlesex	27	–	–	0	
Steel Company of Wales Ground	Margam	23 May 1953 v Ireland	15 June 1963 v Cambridge University	5	–	–	0	–	–	0	
Penrhyn Avenue	Colwyn Bay	27 August 1966 v Derbyshire	18 August 2019 v Lancashire	35	3 September 1972 v Worcestershire	5 May 2013 v Yorkshire	23	–	–	0	(Note: Penrhyn Avenue is located in the far north of Wales in the historic county of Denbighshire. Wales played one first-class match here against a combined Minor Counties team in 1930. Only the first-class matches played at the ground by Glamorgan are recorded in the table. Wales Minor Counties played one List A match here against Nottinghamshire in the 1998 NatWest Trophy, while the Unicorns cricket team played two List A matches here in the 2010 and 2011 Clydesdale Bank 40. Only the List A matches played at the ground by Glamorgan are recorded in the table.)
SWALEC Stadium	Cardiff	24 May 1967 v Indians	12 September 2021 v Gloucestershire	312	1 June 1969 v Somerset	16 August 2021 v Essex	251	16 June 2003 v Northamptonshire	16 July 2021 v Somerset	102	(Note: Wales Minor Counties played two List A matches here in the 2000 NatWest Trophy and 2002 Cheltenham & Gloucester Trophy, while New Zealand A and Sri Lanka A played a List A match here in 2014. Only the List A matches played at the ground by Glamorgan are recorded in the table. The SWALEC Stadium held the finals day for the 2012 Friends Life t20, but none of the three matches played involved Glamorgan. Only the Twenty20 matches played at the ground by Glamorgan are recorded in the table.)
The Oval	Llandudno	–	–	0	only match: 22 June 1969 v Leicestershire		1	–	–	0	(Note: The Oval is located in the far north of Wales in the historic county of Caernarvonshire.)
BP Oil Refinery Ltd Ground	Llandarcy	only match: 7 July 1971 v Oxford University		1	–	–	0	–	–	0	
Vicarage Field	Aberystwyth	–	–	0	31 July 1977 v Essex	27 August 1989 v Warwickshire	2	–	–	0	(Note: Vicarage Field is located in the county of Ceredigion on the west coast of Wales.)
Pen-y-Pound	Abergavenny	22 June 1983 v Worcestershire	26 July 2005 v Bangladesh A	15	10 May 1981 v Worcestershire	5 September 1982 v Northamptonshire	2	–	–	0	(Note: Wales Minor Counties played one List A match here against Denmark in the 2004 Cheltenham & Gloucester Trophy. Only the List A matches played at the ground by Glamorgan are recorded in the table.)
Hoover's Sports Ground	Merthyr Tydfil	–	–	0	5 June 1988 v Kent	11 June 1989 v Middlesex	2	–	–	0	
Parc-y-Dwrlyn Ground	Pentyrch	–	–	0	only match: 23 May 1993 v Northamptonshire		1	–	–	0	
Christ College Ground	Brecon	–	–	0	only match: 5 September 1993 v Zimbabweans		1	–	–	0	(Note: Brecon College Ground is located in the historic county of Brecknockshire.)
Cresselly Cricket Club Ground	Cresselly	–	–	0	only match: 28 May 2007 v Surrey		1	–	–	0	(Note: Cresselly Cricket Club Ground is located in the county of Pembrokeshire.)
Spytty Park	Newport	only match: 14 May 2019 v Gloucestershire		1	-	-	0	-	-	0	
