= Cricket in Wales =

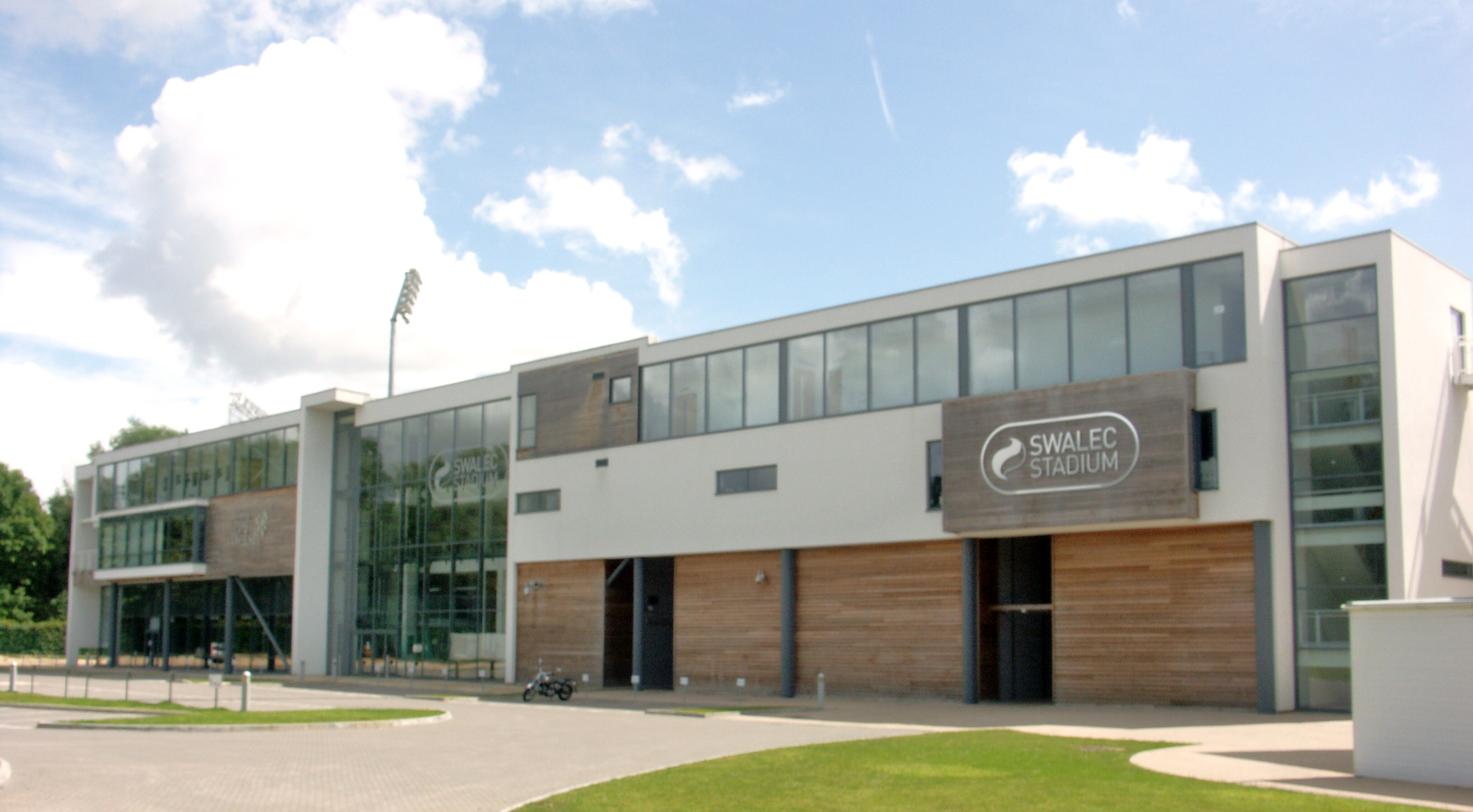
- The entrance to the SWALEC Stadium in Cardiff, the home of Welsh cricket
- Country: Wales
- Governing body: England and Wales Cricket Board
- National teams: Wales (men's); Wales (women's) (Note: Wales is usually represented by England's men's and women's teams in international cricket.)

National competitions
- County Championship; Rachael Heyhoe Flint Trophy; Royal London One-Day Cup; Charlotte Edwards Cup t20 Blast; The Hundred

International competitions
- Cricket World Cup; ICC Men's T20 World Cup; ICC Champions Trophy; Women's Cricket World Cup; ICC Women's T20 World Cup; Under-19 Cricket World Cup

Cricket is a popular sport in Wales; it started in the late 18th century, and has been played in Wales ever since. All cricket within Wales is regulated by the England and Wales Cricket Board (ECB), making it officially part of the English and Welsh cricket system. Glamorgan County Cricket Club is Wales' only first-class county team, and Welsh players are eligible to represent England as Wales does not have its own Test cricket team. Cricket Wales is the national governing body for Cricket in Wales and a constituent board of the ECB. Cricket is played within the Welsh schools system, and is considered one of the country's main summer sports.

== History ==
Cricket, as a sport, has its origins in England, with its first known set of rules written in 1744. The earliest definite reference to cricket in Wales is in 1763, when it was played at Pembroke. The first recorded match was played at Llanegwad in Carmarthenshire. The first club to be mentioned is Swansea, in 1785. By around 1800, matches were also being played in the north, specifically in Holywell; there are records of further matches in the Hanmer area in the 1820s.

With the development of the railways and better transport links, the game of cricket began to spread slowly across Wales and by the 1830s the first interclub fixtures were regularly played. On 5 May 1845, Cardiff Cricket Club was inaugurated, and after three years using the rented field at Longcross, now the location of the Cardiff Royal Infirmary, the team became associated with the Cardiff Arms Park. Both the Arms Park and St. Helen's, in Swansea, were cricket venues before they became associated with rugby union. By 1850 cricket had become a popular activity in many schools, and this in turn helped cricket to be adopted as a working-class sport rather than one associated with the gentry as it was in England.

1859 saw the first match between select English and Welsh teams, when the All England XI played a South Wales XXII. The South Wales team were victorious and this led to the first attempt to form a first-class team in Wales. Although county teams were later formed, most were short lived; but in 1888 Glamorgan County Cricket Club was formed, which would become the most important first-class team in Wales. Glamorgan entered the Minor Counties Cricket Championship in 1897 and was joined by other county teams from Wales: Carmarthenshire, Monmouthshire and Denbighshire. In 1921 Glamorgan became the first county team to gain first-class status, and was the 17th member of the County Championship.

From its earliest days Glamorgan refused to designate a county headquarters, playing its matches at both St. Helen's in Swansea and Sophia Gardens in Cardiff, to try to remain neutral between the two main cities of the county. In 1975, St. Helen's Ground in Swansea held the first international game to be played outside the usual Test venues of England, hosting a One-day International between England and New Zealand.

== Domestic competitions ==
In men's cricket, Glamorgan County Cricket Club is the only Welsh participant in the England and Wales County Championship. They also play in the Royal London One-Day Cup and the T20 Blast. Wales National County Cricket Club also play in the English and Welsh National Counties competitions, for county teams that do not have first-class status.

In women's cricket, Glamorgan currently play in the Women's Twenty20 Cup, and compete in the Women's County Championship.

Welsh Fire represent Wales in both the men's and women's competitions of The Hundred.

Two Welsh cricket leagues have received ECB accreditation: the North Wales Premier Cricket League and the South Wales Cricket League.

== Cricket grounds ==
Glamorgan play at the following grounds: Penrhyn Avenue in Colwyn Bay, Spytty Park in Newport, The Gnoll Cricket Ground in Neath and Sophia Gardens in Cardiff.

On 8 July 2009 Sophia Gardens held its first Test match, when it hosted the first match of the 2009 Ashes Series. The game ended in a draw.

List of cricket grounds in Wales
Official name	City or town	Use by county sides	Capacity	Ends/notes	Ref
BP Oil Refinery Ltd Ground	Llandarcy	Glamorgan (1971)			
Cardiff Arms Park†	Cardiff	Glamorgan (1896–1966)	7,000	• North Stand • Westgate Street End	
Cowbridge Cricket Ground	Cowbridge	Glamorgan (1931–1932)			
Hoover's Sports Ground†	Merthyr Tydfil	Glamorgan (1988–1989)			
Miskin Manor Cricket Club Ground	Rhondda Cynon Taf			Has held a Women's ODI	
Parc-y-Dwrlyn Ground	Pentyrch	Glamorgan (1993)			
Pontarddulais Park	Pontarddulais	Wales National County (1992–present)			
Sophia Gardens	Cardiff	Glamorgan (1967–present); Wales Minor Counties (1988 & 2000–2002)	15,600	• River Taff End • Cathedral Road End; Has held Tests, ODIs, T20Is and WODIs and WT20Is	
Sully Centurions Cricket Club Ground	Sully	Wales Minor Counties (2002)			
St. Helen's	Swansea	Glamorgan (1897–2019); Wales Minor Counties (1989–2008)	4,500	• Mumbles Road End • Pavilion End; Has held ODIs and a Women's ODI	
Steel Company of Wales Ground	Margam	Glamorgan (1953–1963)			
The Gnoll	Neath	Glamorgan (1934–present); Wales Minor Counties (2000)	6,000	• Llantwit Road End • Dyfed Road End	
Ynysangharad Park	Pontypridd	Glamorgan (1926–1999); Wales Minor Counties (1995–2004)	5,000	• River End • Nursury End	

== Governing body ==
The England and Wales Cricket Board (ECB) is the governing body of cricket in England and Wales. It was created on 1 January 1997 combining the roles of the Test and County Cricket Board (TCCB), the National Cricket Association (NCA) and the Cricket Council. They are full members of the International Cricket Council.

Cricket Wales is the governing body of cricket in Wales. It is an umbrella partnership body comprising Glamorgan Cricket, Wales National County Cricket Club, the Welsh Schools Cricket Association and Sport Wales.

== Proposed national team ==
Welsh men's and women's cricket teams have played matches on a number of occasions. Generally however, Wales do not field a team in international competition, with players instead playing for England.

== Notable Welsh cricketers ==
The following Welsh cricketers (except Wilf Wooller) have played Test cricket for England:

- Sydney Barnes – The legendary English fast-medium bowler, born in Staffordshire, made nine appearances for Wales from 1927 until 1930 (retiring at 57 years old). Barnes took 49 wickets for Wales in 1928, including seven for 51 and five for 67 in an eight wicket win over the touring West Indians.
- Johnnie Clay – Clay played one Test match for England in 1935.
- Robert Croft – Croft played international cricket for both England and Wales. He is the first Welsh cricketer to score 10,000 runs and take 1,000 wickets in first-class cricket.
- Joan Davis – She played in three Test matches for England in 1937.
- Carol Evans – She played in three Test matches for England in 1968 and 1969.
- Kay Green – She played in one Test match in 1954 and two ODIs in 1973 for England, becoming the oldest debutant in WODI history.
- Geraint Jones – Born in Papua New Guinea and brought up in Australia, Jones qualified to play for England through his Welsh parents. Jones was the England wicketkeeper between 2004 and 2006, most notably part of the team that regained the Ashes from Australia in 2005. He subsequently represented the Papua New Guinea cricket team.
- Jeff Jones – He took forty-four wickets in fifteen Tests for England from 1964 to 1968.
- Simon Jones – He became an integral member of England's triumphant Ashes-winning team in 2005. Jones's pace and mastery of reverse-swing carried him to 18 wickets at 21 in four Tests, before he was forced to sit out a nervy final match due to an ankle problem.
- Tony Lewis – 9 Tests. He is the only Glamorgan cricketer to captain England and lead a major tour abroad. He went on to become the face of BBC Television cricket coverage in the 1990s, and become president of the MCC.
- Austin Matthews – He played for Northamptonshire, Glamorgan and single Test for England.
- Matthew Maynard – He played four tests for England from 1988 to 1993 and 14 one day internationals. Captained Glamorgan CCC and part of the England backroom staff for their Ashes winning series in 2005.
- Hugh Morris – He played in three Tests for England in 1991.
- Gilbert Parkhouse – He played in seven Tests for England in 1950, 1950–51 and 1959.
- Pat Pocock – He played in twenty Tests and one ODI for England from 1968 to 1985.
- Greg Thomas – He played in five Tests and three ODIs for England between 1986 and 1987.
- Lynne Thomas – She played in 10 Tests and 12 ODIs for England between 1966 and 1979. In 1973, she became the first women to hit a century in a One Day International.
- Maurice Turnbull – He played in nine Tests for England from 1930 to 1936.
- Cyril Walters – He had most of his success after leaving Glamorgan, as captain-secretary of Worcestershire.
- Steve Watkin – He played three Test matches in 1991 and 1993, and four One Day Internationals in 1993 and 1994.
- Allan Watkins – He played for England in fifteen Tests from 1948 to 1952.
- Wilf Wooller – Cricketer, rugby union footballer, cricket administrator and journalist, Wooller captained Glamorgan CCC for 14 years, was Secretary for thirty and President for six.

Alan Jones played a match for England against Rest of the World in 1970 which was later stripped of Test status. He holds the record for most runs in first-class cricket without playing a Test match. In 2020, he was awarded an England Test cap.

In addition, Phil Salt has played ODI and T20I cricket for England, earning 50 caps across both formats, while never having played a Test match.

Aneirin Donald has also played 3 T20I matches for England against Sri Lanka in 2026.

England is not the only country to have fielded Welsh cricketers: Imad Wasim, born in Swansea, earned 130 caps and took 117 wickets for Pakistan in ODIs and T20Is between 2015 and 2024.

== Popularity ==
Cricket has struggled for national attention in Wales, whereas Cricket is said to be the summer national sport of England and the lack of a regular national team has also meant that cricket has a harder time capturing the public imagination in the way that the Welsh national rugby union team and football teams have. Historically, cricket has also had to complete with Welsh Baseball as a summer sport especially in Cardiff and Newport. Despite these issues both Glamorgan and international matches continue to attract significant support.

== Bibliography ==
- Bowen, Rowland (1970). Cricket: A History of its Growth and Development. Eyre & Spottiswoode.
- Davies, John; Jenkins, Nigel (2008). The Welsh Academy Encyclopaedia of Wales. Cardiff: University of Wales Press. ISBN 978-0-7083-1953-6.

== See also ==
- Sport in Wales
- Wales women's cricket team
