= Llandarcy Oil Refinery =

Former oil refinery in Neath Port Talbot, Wales

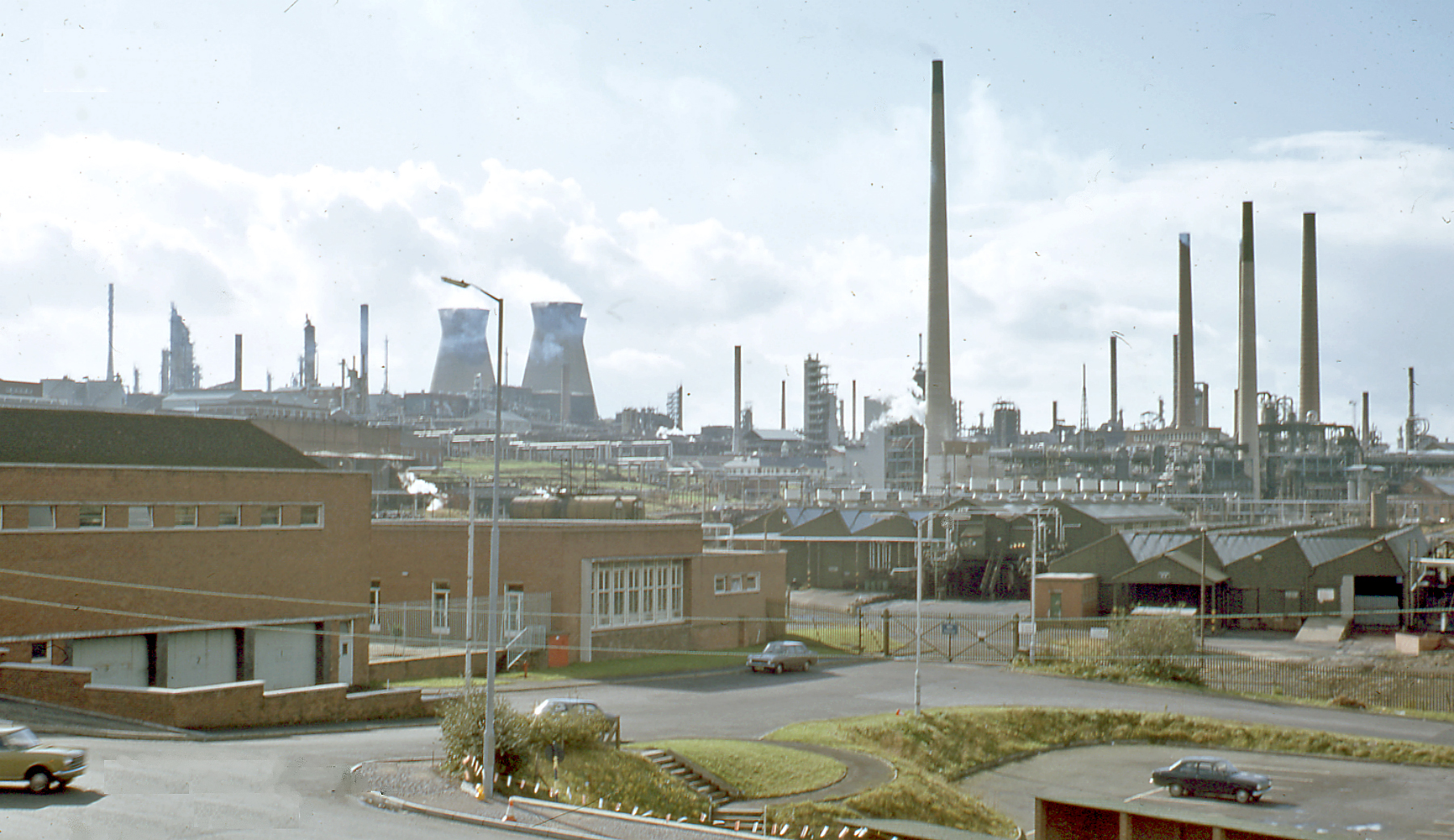
- Refinery in 1973

- Llandarcy Oil Refinery in Neath Port Talbot
- Location: Swansea, UK; 51.646°N 3.863°W

Refinery details
- Operator: BP
- Owner: BP
- Opened: 1919
- Closed: 1998
- Capacity: 200,000 barrels per day (32,000 m^{3}/d)
- No. of employees: 2600

The Llandarcy Oil Refinery, also known as the National Oil Refinery, BP Llandarcy and Skewen refinery, was the United Kingdom's first oil refinery, initially opened by the Anglo-Persian Oil Company (renamed the Anglo-Iranian Oil Company from 1935 and the British Petroleum Company from 1954) on 29 June 1922, although operations had begun on 1 July 1921. Before this, the only oil refined in the UK came from Scottish shale.

== History ==
The refinery cost £3 million and eventually covered an area of about 400 hectares.

Construction began in February 1919, and included construction of a new railway line. There were east and west facing connections on the Swansea District Line to the west of Jersey Marine Junction North. By the 1990s there were eight sidings and an unloading dock. The sidings were abolished by 2010.

The refinery was formally opened by Stanley Baldwin, the President of the Board of Trade. It was named after William Knox D'Arcy, the founder of Anglo-Persian.

Llandarcy was built as a model village to house refinery workers. In the 1950s about 2,600 people worked at the refinery.

When opened, it was producing around 150,000 gallons of petrol a day. By 1960, it was refining 8 million tons of crude oil a year and was the third biggest oil refinery in the UK after Fawley Refinery and Lindsey Oil Refinery.

One part of the refinery was near Queen's Dock; ships came from the British Tanker Company.

In 1959 the refinery contributed financially to new building work at University College Swansea.

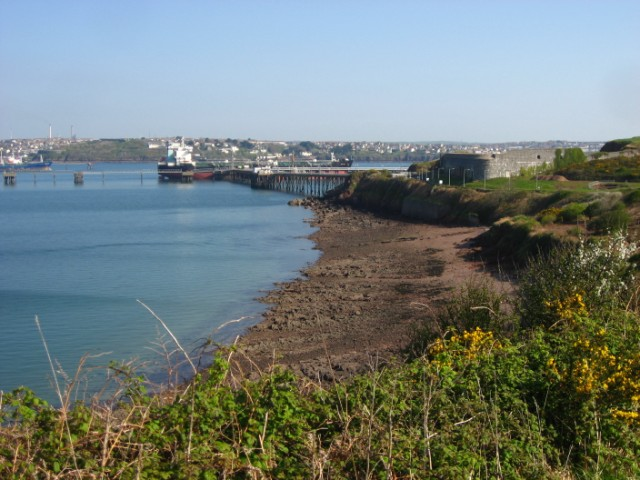
Oil terminal

In 1961, a new oil terminal was built by BP at Angle Bay in Pembrokeshire. Swansea docks could not unload large oil tankers, nothing over 20,000 tons. Most British oil tanker terminals could fit a 32,000 ton tanker, at the most. A new oil tanker dock was to be built from 1956 at Popton Point, for 45,000 ton oil tankers, with a 62-mile 46cm-diameter (18 inches) crude oil pipeline; it would be built at Angle Bay from the end of 1957, and was to open in July 1960. 400 workers were building the terminal, 250 were building the oil tanks, and 620 workers were building the pipeline. The pipeline was completed in December 1959, after 14 months. The most difficult section was the 400-ft crossing of the tidal River Towy. Crude oil would be discharged at 3,000 tons per hour. The terminal would cost £6.5m. The former Popton Fort housed BP offices. The pipeline opened on Sunday 28 August 1960, with oil from the 'British Statesman' tanker. Fifty staff worked at the terminal. The Angle Bay Ocean Terminal was in full operation at the end of November 1960. The terminal was officially opened on Thursday 20 April 1961 by Richard Wood, Baron Holderness, the Conservative Minister of Power.

Llandarcy closed in 1998. Demolition of the refinery was completed in October 2009.

== Operations ==
As initially constructed the refinery produced petrol, kerosene and fuel oils. By 1924 it produced a complete range of petroleum products including a wide range of lubricants, oil for special purposes, and paraffin wax. In 1926 experimental thermal cracking units were installed.

The refining capacity of the refinery over its operational life is summarized in the table.

Llandarcy refinery capacity
Year	Capacity, tonnes per year
1938	360,000
1947	1,100,000
1950	2,850,000
1955	3,000,000
1960	3,000,000
1963	5,500,000
1965	7,800,000
1969	8,000,000
1972	8,300,000
1974	8,300,000
1975	8,300,000
1979	5,200,000
1985	2,750,000

From 1947, capacity of the site was trebled, at a cost of £9m, under chairman William Fraser, 1st Baron Strathalmond. Output of the refinery was planned go from 420,000 tons in 1947, to 850,000 tons in 1948, to 3m tons in 1949.

The US Economic Cooperation Administration helped to fund this expansion, as well as the Shell Haven refinery. Output of the refinery was 781,000 tons in 1948, and 1,259,000 tons in 1949.

During 1952, catalytic cracking units were installed, and at Kent. This technology had been invented just before the war.

The Wales Gas Board trialled butane gas in 1952, produced at the site.

The site produced 3,671,000 tons in 1951, and 4,254,000 tons in 1952. By 1955, BP was refining 10m tons in the UK. The UK could refine 29m tons in total; in 1945 this was 2.5m tons. In 1955, UK total demand of refined products was 20m tons. World consumption was 265m tons in 1938, which was 650m tons in 1954. Total BP refining in the UK dropped to 7.6m tons in 1957.

A ferrofiner unit, for lubricants, was developed at Sunbury, which would be built from December 1961, and operating from June 1963.

In 1960, the UK refined 50m tons of oil, in total. £4.5m was constructed for a larger plant from 1962. UK refining was 58m tons in 1963, but demand was 61m tons. UK refining capacity was expected to be 68m tons by the end of 1964, and 88m tons by the end of 1967. 2.5m tons of refining would be added, to take refining capacity to 8m tons by 1967.

From May 1970 BP built a new £16m lubricating oil complex. This raised the production of lubricating oil from 100,000 tonnes a year, to 200,000 tons a year, to be completed by early 1972. It comprised a 30,000 barrel per day vacuum distillation unit, a 9,000 barrel per day propane de-asphalting unit, a 10,000 bpd extraction unit, a 6,240 bpd dewaxing unit, and a 6,000 bpd ferro-finer.

Half the capacity was decommissioned in late 1985, the remainder was closed in January 1986, together with the Angle Bay terminal and pipeline. The refinery was restructured as a specialist refinery until it was closed in 1999.

The refinery was the focus of a significant petrochemical industry in the area: the Baglan Bay complex. Baglan Bay was developed from 1961, to make PVC. £40m was constructed on Baglan Bay in 1968, to start operating from 1971.

=== Import pipeline ===
Crude oil was originally imported through the purpose-built Queen’s Dock at Swansea, capable of handling tankers of up to 28,000 D.W.T. To accommodate larger tankers then being developed, a new jetty below Fort Popton and a new terminal was constructed at Angle Bay in Milford Haven, Pembrokeshire in 1962. The terminal could handle tankers of up to 100,000 D.W.T. (Dead Weight Tons). Crude oil was pumped from the jetties to five storage tanks built within the Fort and then to the tank farm at Kilpaison (51°40'29"N 5°02'47"W) on the south east edge of Angle Bay and then to Llandarcy through a new pipeline, from November 1960. The specification of the Angle Bay to Llandarcy refinery pipeline was as follows.

Crude oil supply pipeline Angle Bay to Llandarcy refinery
Parameter	Value
Length	62 miles (96 km)
Diameter	46 cm
Year commissioned	1961
Capacity	5 million tonnes/year, 8 million tonnes/year
Decommissioned	1985

=== Location ===
The site of the refinery, which covered 650 acres, was off the Llandarcy Interchange (Junction 43) of the present-day M4, near the B4290 and Skewen. The area is known as Coedffranc and Coed Darcy. To the south, off the A483, is Crymlyn Burrows.

== Visits ==
- On the second day of a two-day visit to South Wales in November 1945, the King and Queen travelled from Wenvoe to Neath on the train, arriving at 10.30am. The road journey was 15 miles. 2,000 workers were at the refinery.

== See also ==
- BP Oil Refinery Ltd Ground
- National Oil Refineries/ BP Llandarcy - as football works team that played in the Welsh Football League and the Neath & District League

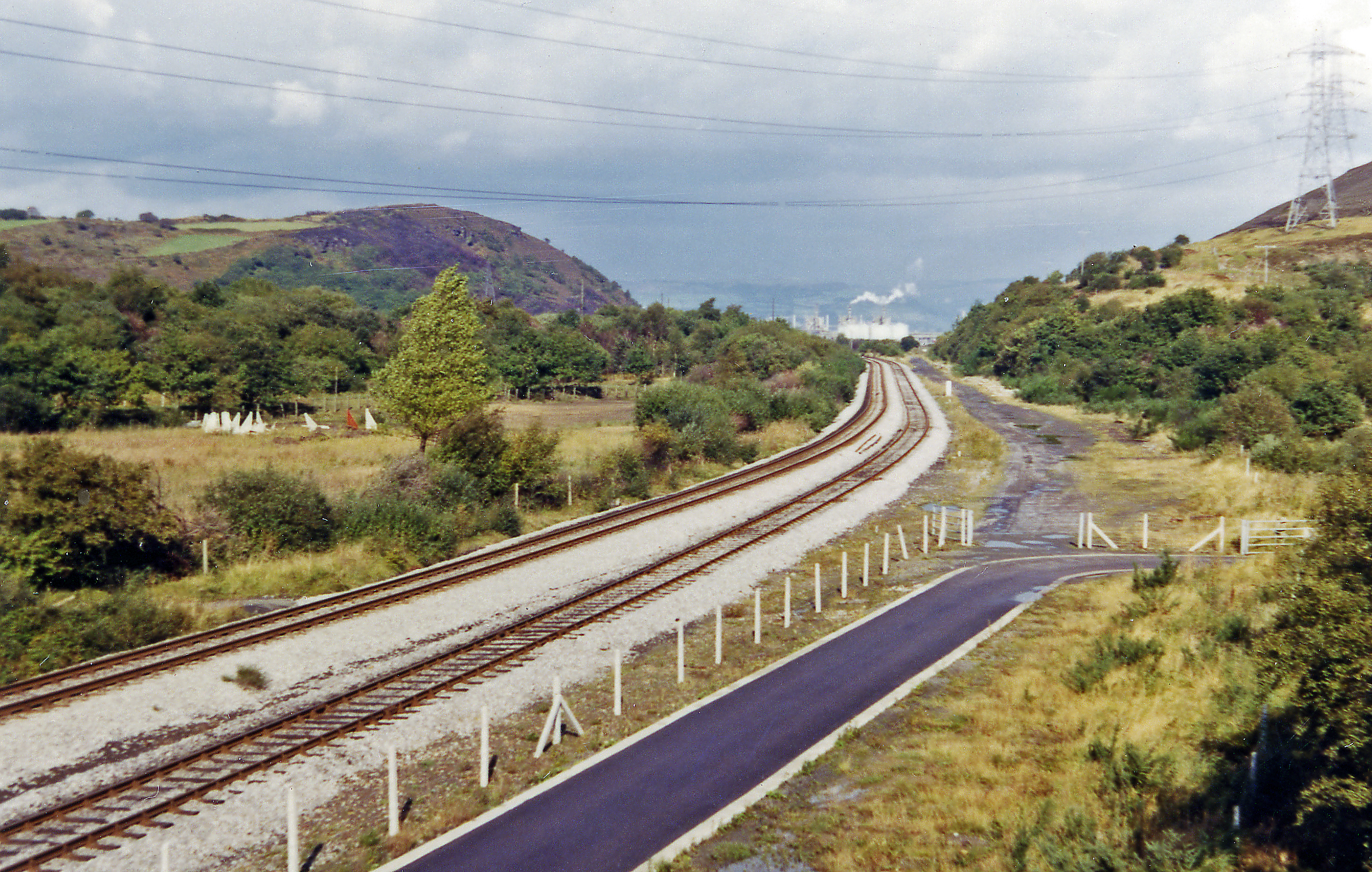
Railway to the site in 1973
