= Coedffranc North =

Coordinates: 51.66265°N 3.84627°W

- Population: 2,411 (2011 census)
- Principal area: Neath Port Talbot
- Preserved county: West Glamorgan
- Country: Wales
- Sovereign state: United Kingdom
- UK Parliament: Neath and Swansea East
- Senedd Cymru – Welsh Parliament: Aberavon
- Councillors: Mike Harvey (Labour)

Coedffranc North is an electoral ward of Neath Port Talbot county borough, Wales. is a part of the Coedffranc community and is in the Senedd constituency of Aberavon and the UK constituency of Neath and Swansea East.

Coedffranc North is bounded by the wards of Dyffryn to the northeast; Coedffranc Central and Coedffranc West to the south; and Llansamlet of Swansea to the west. The ward consists of a built up residential strip of north Skewen and the neighbourhood of Lon-Las to the south and rural farmland and woodland to the north on the slopes of Mynydd Drummau.

In the 2017 local council elections, the results were:

Candidate	Party	Votes	Status
Mike Harvey	Labour	434	Labour hold
Keith Davies	Liberal Democrats	270	
Margaret Duguid	UKIP	69	

In the 2012 local council elections, the electorate turnout was 39.64%. The results were:

Candidate	Party	Votes	Status
Mike Harvey	Labour	451	Labour gain
Keith Davies	Liberal Democrats	268	
