= Coedffranc =

Village and community in Neath Port Talbot, Wales

Coordinates: 51°38′52″N 3°51′35″W

- Community
- Location within Neath Port Talbot
- Principal area: Neath Port Talbot
- Country: Wales
- Sovereign state: United Kingdom
- Police: South Wales
- Fire: Mid and West Wales
- Ambulance: Welsh
- List of places UK Wales Neath Port Talbot Map of the community

Coedffranc is a community and former village in the county borough of Neath Port Talbot, Wales.

Today the village has merged into an enlarged Skewen, occupying the central regions of the village of Skewen. Coedffranc is now only a local government community. The community includes the villages of Jersey Marine, Llandarcy and Coed Darcy. and had a population of 9,053 in 2011.

== Governance ==
Coedffranc encompasses the electoral wards of Coedffranc Central, Coedffranc North and Coedffranc West for elections to Neath Port Talbot County Borough Council.

Coedffranc was also the name of an electoral ward of West Glamorgan from 4 May 1989, formed from Coedffranc Central and Coedffranc East by The County of West Glamorgan (Electoral Arrangements) Order 1989. Coedffranc Central and Coedffranc East were recreated for the Neath Port Talbot local elections of 1995.

Prior to 1974 Coedffranc was a ward to Glamorgan County Council, electing one councillor.
