= Steeltown Murders =

British television series

- Genre: Factual drama
- Based on: Murders of Joseph Kappen
- Written by: Ed Whitmore
- Directed by: Marc Evans
- Starring: Philip Glenister; Steffan Rhodri
- Theme music composer: Sarah Warne
- Country of origin: United Kingdom
- Original language: English
- No. of series: 1
- No. of episodes: 4

Production
- Executive producers: Ed Talfan; Jon Hill; Ed Whitmore; Helen Perry; Rebecca Ferguson
- Producer: Hannah Thomas
- Cinematography: Sam Thomas
- Editor: Tim Hodges
- Production companies: Severn Screen; All3Media International

Original release
- Network: BBC One
- Release: 15 May – 5 June 2023

Steeltown Murders is a four-part factual drama television miniseries written by Ed Whitmore and directed by Marc Evans. It was produced for the BBC by Severn Screen, based in Wales, and aired on BBC One. It stars Philip Glenister and Steffan Rhodri as detectives investigating the real-life murders committed by Joseph Kappen in Port Talbot in South Wales. It premiered on 15 May 2023 on BBC One, with all episodes immediately available on BBC iPlayer.

== Synopsis ==
Twenty-first century technological advances help detectives with a cold murder case from 1973. Geraldine Hughes and Pauline Floyd both left the Top Rank nightclub in Swansea without ever making it home. Their bodies were discovered later in Llandarcy. Dubbed the case of the “Saturday Night Strangler”, it became the first documented case of a serial killer in Wales. Joseph Kappen was the real-life perpetrator. As of 1 October 2024, Port Talbot no longer produces steel.

== Cast ==
- Philip Glenister as DCI Paul Bethell
  - Scott Arthur as young DC Paul Bethell
- Steffan Rhodri as DC Phil ‘Bach’ Rees
  - Siôn Alun Davies as young DC Bach Rees
- Keith Allen as Dai Williams
  - Rhys Rusbatch as young Dai Williams
- Sharon Morgan as Pat Williams
- Karen Paullada as DSI Jackie Roberts
- Richard Harrington as Dr Colin Dark
- Nia Roberts as Karina Bethell
  - Elinor Crawley as young Karina Bethell
- Priyanga Burford as Sita Anwar
  - Natasha Vasandani as young Sita Anwar
- Kriss Dosanjh as Rohan Anwar
- Calista Davies as Geraldine Hughes
- Jade Croot as Pauline Floyd
- Steve Nicolson as DI Tony Warren
- Oliver Ryan as DCS Ray Allen
- Richard Corgan as DS Chris Wynne
- Rhodri Miles as John Dilwyn Morgan
  - Ben McGregor as young John Dilwyn Morgan
- Caroline Berry as Mrs Morgan
  - Rosie Sheehy as young Mrs Morgan
- William Thomas as Denver Hughes
  - Gruffudd Glyn as young Denver Hughes
- Mair Rowlands as Jean Hughes
  - Amy Morgan as young Jean Hughes
- Walter van Dyk as Mr Croiset
- Matthew Gravelle as Seb
- Mia Khan as Maya
- Richard Elfyn as DS Vic Jenkins
  - Dyfan Dwyfor as young DS Vic Jenkins
- Gareth John Bale as DC Geraint Bale
- Joshua Jenkins as DC Si Owen
- Morgan Hopkins as DC Nigel Parke
- Rhys ap William as DS Jack Griffiths
- Dewi Rhys Williams as ACC Tim Bailey
- Phil Howe as DC Elwyn Wheadon
- Terema Wainwright as Hodges
- Lisa Victoria as Jane Marchant
- Wyn Bowen Harries as Walter Watkins
- Nicholas McGaughey as Thomas Willoughby
- Matthew Aubrey as Phil Blunt
- Maxine Evans as Jan Stiles
- Maria Pride as Christine Kappen
  - Remy Beasley as young Christine Kappen
- Aneurin Barnard as Joseph Kappen
- Francine Morgan as Suzie
- Phylip Harries as Tony
- Arwyn Davies as Rhys Webber
- Amelia Donkor as Sylvia Kambray

== Episodes ==
No.	Title	Directed by	Written by	Original release date	U.K. viewers (millions)
1	"Episode 1"	Marc Evans	Ed Whitmore	15 May 2023	4.63
2	"Episode 2"	Marc Evans	Ed Whitmore	22 May 2023	4.15
3	"Episode 3"	Marc Evans	Ed Whitmore	29 May 2023	4.47
4	"Episode 4"	Marc Evans	Ed Whitmore	5 June 2023	4.42

== Production ==
The series is written by Ed Whitmore and made by Severn Screen. The four-part series is directed by Marc Evans with Hannah Thomas as producer in association with All3Media International. The executive producers on the series are Ed Talfan, Jon Hill and Ed Whitmore for Severn Screen with Helen Perry and Rebecca Ferguson for the BBC.

=== Filming ===
Filming began in South Wales in November 2022. The real life detective Paul Bethell was involved in the production and Philip Glenister said he felt “responsibility” to get the story right for the bereaved family members.

== Broadcast ==
Steeltown Murders aired in the UK from Monday 15 May 2023 on BBC One, with all episodes becoming immediately available on BBC iPlayer.

== Reception ==
The series was chosen as “pick of the week” in The Sunday Times on 14 May 2023. Commenting that “the evolution of police work drives the drama, but a careful script keeps sight of the victims and their families”. Lucy Mangan in The Guardian gave the series four stars, saying that the script "does full justice to the painstaking and never glamorous policework that finally found the Saturday Night Strangler, and the difference integrity makes to a job and to a life". Rachel Cooke in The New Statesman said she was left “bored and furious”.

The series won the best television drama series and best costume awards at the BAFTA Cymru Awards in October 2024.

== See also ==
- List of Welsh fiction television series
