= Skewen Dram Road =

Mining railway in Wales

Coordinates: 51.6716°N 3.8362°W

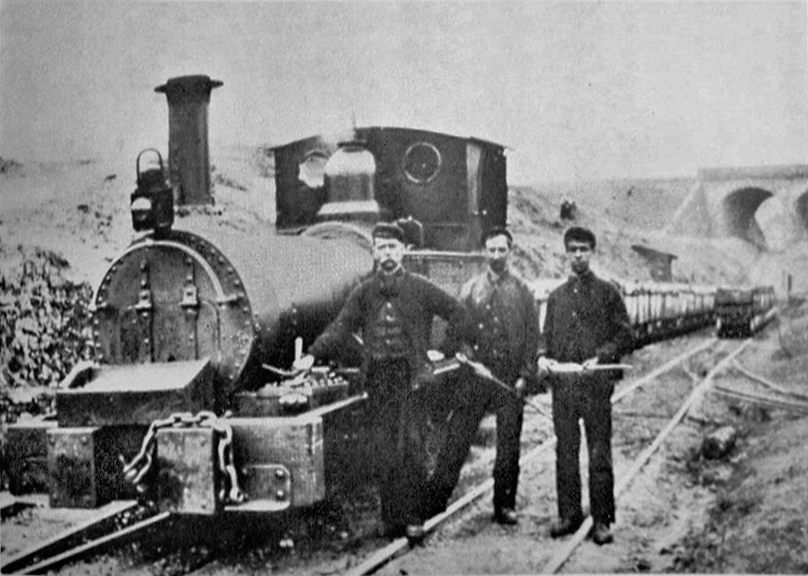
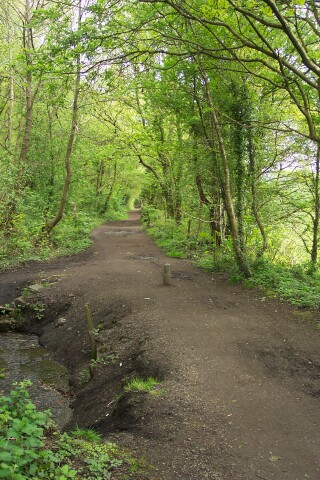
- The Old, Small 0-6-0T Narrow gauge steam locomotive ‘Abercrave’ constructed by The Neath Abbey Iron Company in 1870 and 1871 for The Neath Abbey Coal Company at a cost of £550, seen here at the top of The Skewen Incline c.1897 now owned by The Main Colliery Company Limited, a pack of Trams seen parked behind it. From Left To Right, John Thomas, Loco-Driver, D.W. Thomas, Ropeman, and J. Williams, Latcher. Remnants of the Dram Roads trackbed, c.2005

Technical
- Line length: 3 miles (5 km)
- Track gauge: 2 feet 7 1/2 inches (800 mm)
- Minimum radius: 2 chains (40 m)

The Skewen Dram Road was a 3 miles (5 km) long mining railway near Skewen in Wales with a gauge of 2 feet 7 1/2 inches (800 mm).

== Route ==
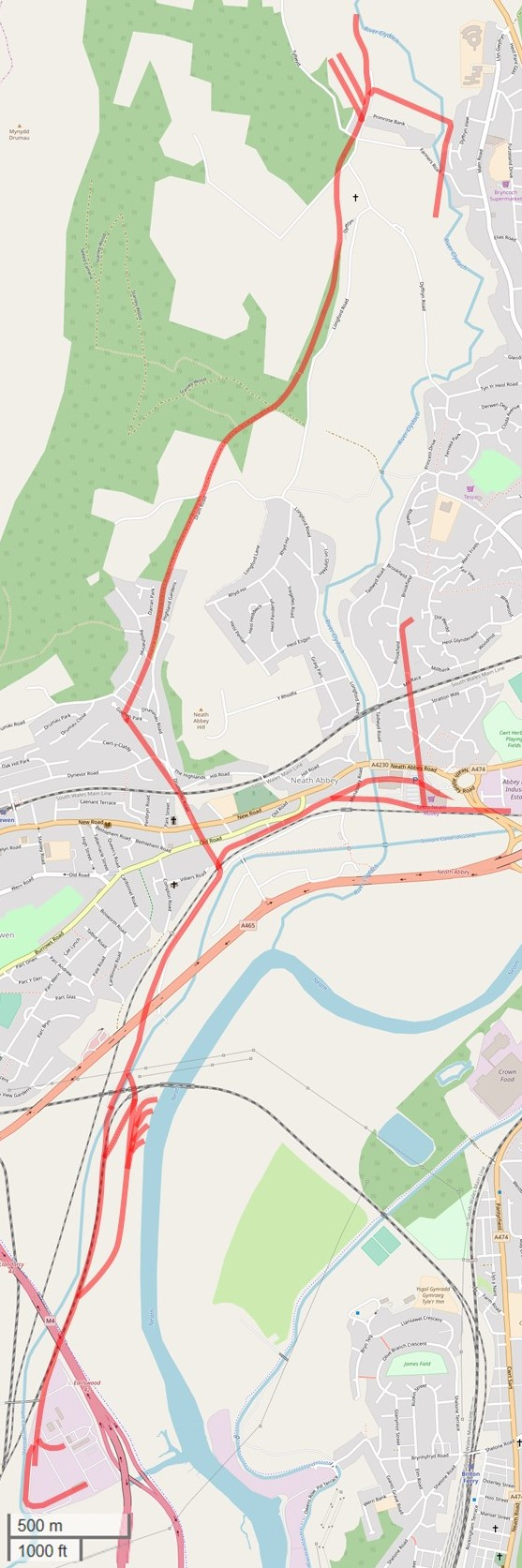
Route of former Skewen Dram Road superimposed onto modern map

The Dramroad was built to take coal from Dyffryn and Bryncoch to Skewen Wharf via the Skewen Incline and Dramroad.

In 1871, the Neath Abbey Coal Company, who operated the dram road across New Road, was requested to install level crossing gates. These were painted plain white which hence gave their name to the location, which is still known as White Gates locally.

== Ownership ==
The Skewen Dram Road was owned and operated by a handful of companies in its lifetime, the Main Colliery Company Limited, the successor of the Dynevor Dyffryn and Neath Abbey United Collieries Company Limited, and likely the Neath Abbey Coal Company.

The New Neath Abbey Coal Company is said to have been founded in June 1819 by the Fox family, which held 7/12ths of the company's shares and Joseph T. Price, who held the remaining 5/12ths. In 1873 the company failed, and its assets were sold to Batters & Scott on behalf of the Dyffryn Main Colliery Company. In 1874 the property was sold again to the United Company, a merger of the Dynevor Dyffryn and Neath Abbey United Collieries Company, under the directorship of John Newell Moore of Cambrian Place, Swansea. The United Company ceased to operate in 1888 and was re-incorporated as the Main Colliery Company Limited with effect from 1 May 1889.

== Accidents ==
According to a contemporary newspaper report, a 1906 accident involving the death of three individual men. These being;

John Nicholls, 37, labourer, New-Road, Skewen, married, with children

Thomas Brown, 69, married, grown-up family of 13, Woodman-place, Skewen

John Dunn, 66, single, labourer, Neath

Serious injuries were inflicted on two others, it occurred on the evening of 20 September, 1906, on the new standard gauge private railway of the Main Colliery Company, by means of which coal is conveyed from Bryncoch to the wharves on Neath River. A party of ten line repairers was proceeding towards the top of the Skewen, on a repairer's trolley and was rounding a curve when it was struck by a locomotive light engine traveling on the same rails in the opposite direction at approximately the same speed of six or seven miles an hour, though it may have been going much faster by the way of the force it pushed the trolley backwards. The locomotives brakes were applied and steam was shut off but it was too late, the locomotive dashed into the trolley sending it 40 yards backwards. The effect of the impact was so great that three of the men who did not jump off the trolley in time were seriously hurt and died before they could be conveyed home.

The engine driver was William Lewis, Old-Road, Skewen

The engine fireman was John Williams

== Locomotives ==
When the company assets were acquired by the Main Colliery Co. Ltd. in the spring and summer of 1889, four steam locomotives were included;

The two 1858 R. & W. Hawthorn(s)

The 1870 Neath Abbey Iron Company(s) ‘Abercrave’

and a 1864 Neath Abbey Iron Company 0-4-0ST, of which two were subsequently scrapped, these presumably being the two R. & W. Hawthorns. The company converted its narrow gauge lines to standard gauge in 1899, though the company had considered changing the gauge nine years earlier, back on 17 December 1890, and it was agreed on 18 February 1891 that the gauge of the company’s tramroads was to be altered. On 11 October 1899, conversion of the tramway gauge to standard had been completed. Four narrow gauge locomotives were to be sold, but then it had decided to advertise all six small locomotives for sale by 16 November 1899, of which two had been built by the Neath Abbey Ironworks in 1864 and 1870, three by Peckett & Sons in 1890, 1891 and 1894, and one by the Lilleshall Company in 1870.

The gauge was both 2 feet 7 1/2 inches (800 mm) and approx 2 feet 8 inches (813 mm). There were three Peckett’s with Peckett works Nos. 501/1890, 542/1891 and 602/1894, locomotive 602 was unique as it had been both standard gauge and narrow gauge at certain points in its life, Abercrave, the Neath Abbey Iron Company 0-4-0ST, and the Lilleshall constructed for a company listed per the ‘TH list’ as a ‘Dynevor United Company’, which had been baptized ‘DYFFRYN’, it arrived in March, 1870 and worked till 1899.

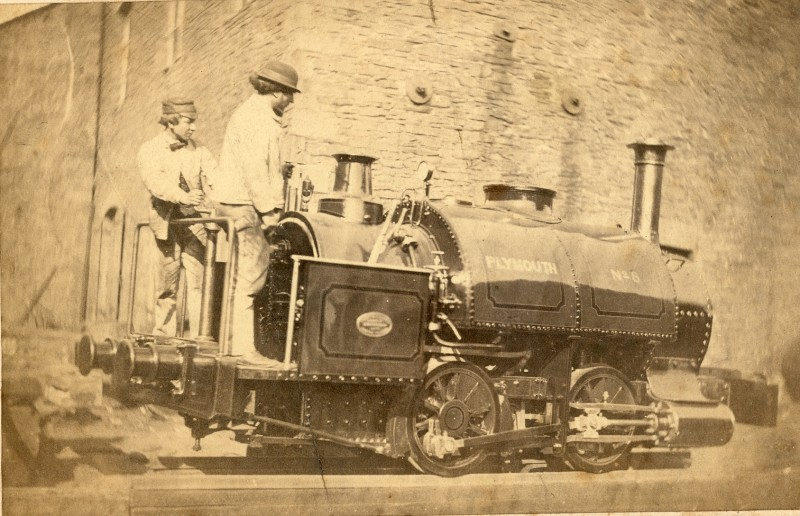
Locomotive Plymouth N°8 of the Neath Abbey Ironworks for the Plymouth Ironworks of Merthyr Tydfil constructed c.1864

Two similar 0-4-0T steam locomotives with a gauge of 2 feet 8 inches (810 mm), 8 inches x 16 inches cylinders, and 2 feet 4 inches diameter driving wheels were supplied to the Neath Abbey Coal Company in August 1858, these had been constructed and designed by the company of R. & W. Hawthorn in Newcastle upon Tyne.

These two steam locomotives had both been constructed in the months of 1858 as N°1045/1858 ‘Iron Duke’ which had been dispatched in August and N°1046/1858 ‘Prince Of Wales’ which was dispatched on 31 August 1858. They were both (presumably) subsequently sold for scrap in 1889 or later, likely due to wear or obsolescence.

A copy of the Pecketts, Bristol, locomotive list records the entires for 501, 542 and 602 as:

501 "Special M3" 0-6-0ST gauge 2'-7½" 10x14 cyls. 2'-6" wheels ex works 7.2.1890 to Main Coll. Co., Neath Abbey

542 Class M3 0-4-0ST gauge 2'-7½" 10x14 cyls. 2'-6½" wheels (no buffers) ex works 6.1891 to Main Coll. Co., Neath Abbey
