= Skewen Greyhound Stadium =

- Location: Skewen, Neath Port Talbot, Wales
- Coordinates: 51°39′33″N 3°51′06″W
- Opened: 1930s
- Closed: 1994

The Skewen Greyhound Stadium is a former greyhound racing track in Skewen, Neath Port Talbot, Wales.

== History ==
The track was situated on the south side of the Swansea District railway line and the north side of Charles Street off Winifred Road. Originally, it was a field used by a cricket team known as the Skewen Lillywhites, or the Waun. The track was started in the 1930s and opened by Will Thomas on the field, around the same time as the adjacent Tennant Park which was built in 1936 for Skewen RFC. In 1967 the track added a football pitch inside the greyhound circuit and Neath Athletic FC became tenants, changing their name to Skewen Athletic (now called Neath F.C).

A large track circumference of 530 yards resulted in a very easy galloping circuit with distances of 312, 530 and 760 yards. The racing was independent (unaffiliated to a governing body) and by the late 1980s the track surface had been changed from grass to grass straights and sanded bends with the hare used being an 'Inside Sumner'. Racing took place on Wednesday and Friday evenings.

The stadium closed in 1994 and was later demolished and is now housing called 'The Meadows'.
