= Joseph Kappen =

Welsh serial killer (1941–1990)

- Kappen, c. 1973
- Born: Joseph William Kappen; 30 October 1941; Port Talbot, Wales, UK
- Died: 17 June 1990 (aged 48); Port Talbot, Neath Port Talbot, Wales, UK
- Other name: The Saturday Night Strangler
- Spouse: Christine Powell (m. 1964; div. 1980)
- Motive: Rape, possible rage or Misogyny
- Conviction: Not convicted

Details
- Victims: 3–7
- Span of crimes: July 1973 –: September 1973 (confirmed); February 1976 (suspected)
- Country: United Kingdom
- Date apprehended: Not apprehended

Joseph William Kappen (30 October 1941 – 17 June 1990), also known as the Saturday Night Strangler, was a Welsh serial killer who murdered three teenage girls in Llandarcy and Tonmawr, near his hometown of Port Talbot, in 1973. Kappen is also suspected of committing a fourth murder in February 1976.

Kappen's confirmed victims were all sixteen-year-old girls whom he lured into his car on Saturday evenings in Briton Ferry and Swansea. All three were driven to rural locations where they were subsequently raped, then killed by strangulation. Kappen was never arrested for his crimes and died of lung cancer in 1990.

Kappen is notable for being the first person to be posthumously identified as a serial killer via familial DNA profiling. He was also the first, of many, documented serial killer in Welsh history.

== Background ==
Joseph Kappen was born on 30 October 1941 and had six siblings. His parents' marriage broke up when he was young and he was raised by his stepfather in Port Talbot, a heavily industrial town in Wales dominated by its large steelworks.

Kappen began attracting police attention for petty offences at age 12. He went on to accumulate over thirty convictions for car theft, petrol theft, burglary and assault, and spent years in and out of prison. Kappen alternately worked as a lorry or bus driver, and then as a bouncer. He never stayed in employment for long and was described as a loner.

In 1962, Kappen met his first wife, 17-year-old Christine Powell, and they married in February 1964. Ten days after their nuptials, Kappen was sent to prison for burglary. Christine then gave birth to a daughter and then to a son, Paul, after she was raped by Kappen after his release from prison. Christine later testified that Kappen was physically abusive towards her and would rape her every two weeks. At one point, he fatally strangled the family dog in front of his son while walking it on a nearby beach because it was "too old".

Kappen was known to regularly pursue local teenage girls during the marriage, with his job as a bouncer giving him an opportunity to interact with them. When working as a bus driver he was known to use his rest breaks to approach teenage girls on the village green at Llandarcy. In 1964, Kappen attempted to force himself on a 15-year-old schoolgirl in his Sandfields housing estate but she escaped. In February 1973, a man resembling Kappen picked up two female hitchhikers and drove them to a nearby isolated road before attempting to rape both of them but they also managed to escape; the victims did not report the incident as one thought she would get into trouble with her father.

== 1973 murders ==
On Saturday 14 July 1973 Sandra Newton, aged 16, went missing after a night out in Briton Ferry. Three days later her body was found raped and strangled in a rural location some miles away. Newton had been abducted after trying to hitchhike home after visiting a nightclub that night. She was strangled with her own skirt and dumped in a ditch near a coal mine in Tonmawr. Little attempt had been made to hide the body, with it being left at the entrance of a culvert. Police suspected a local man was responsible due to the detailed knowledge of the area the killer would have needed to be aware of the remote dump site.

Two months later in the early hours of Sunday 16 September 1973 Geraldine Hughes and Pauline Floyd, both aged 16, hitched a lift home after a Saturday night out at a nightclub in Swansea. The next morning they were found dead, their bodies being found raped and strangled in Llandarcy woodland five miles away. It appeared that one girl had attempted to escape from her attacker and had made it yards from the road near to where her father worked but had been caught by her attacker and killed. The murders created a sense of fear in the community over whether the attacker would strike again. Although they occurred nearby, at the time, the murders of Hughes and Floyd were not linked to the similar murder of Newton.

=== Initial investigation ===
Police soon established that Hughes and Floyd had been seen getting a lift home in a white Austin 1100 on the night of their disappearance. Police followed up numerous lines of enquiry but, as was the case in police investigations at the time, all intelligence and information was collected on large amounts of paperwork, which complicated the inquiry. The Port Talbot steelworks employed 13,000 men, all of whom had to be considered as potential suspects. Both the construction of the nearby M4 motorway and the ongoing Neath fair meant hundreds of itinerant workers had to be considered, as well as the countless strangers these events brought into the area. Detectives attempted to trace men who owned an Austin 1100 in the area, but it meant that more than 10,000 drivers had to be visited and questioned. The three-day working week imposed by the British government on everyone across the country, as a result of an energy shortage, further reduced the resources of the enquiry and hampered the investigation.

However, one of the men who was investigated as part of enquiries concerning the Austin 1100 was Kappen, who owned that model of vehicle. When police turned up at his home to speak to him, they found his Austin was on blocks with its wheels removed, with Kappen claiming that he could not have committed the murders as his car was not roadworthy. However, in the days after the killings, Kappen's car was logged as being on the road by police carrying out stop and check operations. This would have disproved this claim, but without a computerised system for cross-referencing, this fact was not noticed by detectives at the time. Kappen also claimed to have been at Neath fair on the night of the murders, and his wife, Christine Powell, gave him a false alibi, which she later said was common for her to do when police investigated her husband. Ultimately, therefore, Kappen was not pursued further as a suspect at the time. In mid-1974 the investigation was scaled down.

=== Re-opening of investigations ===
Police hoped that advances in DNA testing would help solve the murders, and in 1998 there was a significant development when a profile of the killer's DNA was isolated via testing on the clothing of Hughes and Floyd. In 2000 the profile was uploaded to the DNA database to see if it matched any person arrested or charged since 1995 (the year in which DNA started to be taken from people arrested of crimes), although no match was made. However, the developments in DNA led to a full reinvestigation of the murders, titled Operation Magnum. In January 2001 the Llandarcy murders were reconstructed on BBC One's Crimewatch.

Around this time, there was media speculation linking serial killer Fred West to the murders as he once worked in Llandarcy, but this was swiftly ruled out by police after the DNA was checked. 35,000 persons of interest were initially identified for DNA testing, but a psychological profiler was employed to reduce the number to a priority list of 500. Fifty of these were witnesses, relatives of the victims, stepfathers, boyfriends and anyone who had featured prominently in the initial investigation, and the others were known criminal suspects. Kappen was listed as suspect number 200, and detectives visited what they believed to be his address in Port Talbot in August 2001 but they discovered that he had died of lung cancer in June 1990, although his former wife, Christine Powell, who had divorced him in 1980, still lived there.

Two months later, testing on the clothes of Sandra Newton revealed that she had been a victim of the same killer as Hughes and Floyd, meaning that the three murders were officially linked for the first time and revealing that all three had been murdered by the same unidentified individual.

=== Familial DNA enquiries ===
Due to the period of time that had elapsed since the murders, South Wales Police decided to employ a previously unknown tactic of searching for the DNA of possible living descendants of the murderer as their genetic profiles would be similar to the killer's. Fifty per cent of an individual's DNA is inherited from each parent, so investigators believed that they could discover who the killer was by making a partial match between the killer's profile and that of any children they may have had. Investigators, therefore, examined local individuals' profiles that matched part of the killer's profile and created a list of 100 potential suspects. One of these was local car thief Paul Kappen, whose DNA was already on police files but who was only seven years old at the time of the murders. Paul's profile showed a distinctive similarity to the killer's, prompting police to make his deceased father, Joseph, known to have been investigated in the original enquiry, the prime suspect.

=== Exhumation of body and positive DNA match ===
The findings of the DNA testing led detectives to apply to Home Secretary David Blunkett to exhume Kappen's body in order to confirm through DNA that he was the murderer, which was granted. In 2002 the body was exhumed from Goytre Cemetery on the outskirts of Port Talbot, with it being said by witnesses that a thunderstorm suddenly passed over as the exhumation began and that a large thunderclap was heard when the ground was first dug up, suggesting to them that they had "unearthed evil". Kappen's family consistently denied that he could have been responsible for the murders and claimed he was innocent despite the evidence.

Forensic testing on Kappen's remains subsequently established a perfect match to the murderer's sample, finally proving beyond doubt that Kappen was responsible for the murders. South Wales Police declared the case closed. The now-elderly surviving parents of the victims expressed relief that they had finally received a form of closure, with the mother of Hughes stating, "Now we can close the book on that hell forever".

After the findings, Kappen's former wife Christine Powell, who had previously insisted that Kappen was innocent, stated that "our first thoughts are with the families of the victims. Our concerns are protection from hurt for our children. We are all deeply shocked by the revelations".

== Historical significance of the case ==
The Kappen investigation was the first in the world to use familial DNA tracing in order to posthumously identify a serial killer, and to solve a previously unsolved murder with familial DNA. Kappen is also considered the first documented serial killer in Welsh history.

The outcome of the case created hopes of solving other unsolved historical murders through DNA testing, and South Wales Police subsequently embarked on DNA screening in order to solve the murder of Lynette White, which was subsequently solved in 2003 when Jeffrey Gafoor was convicted of the killing. In 2004 another similar attempt to identify a serial killer through familial DNA was made by Strathclyde Police in the Bible John case when they announced their intention to test a number of men after the discovery of a DNA sample at a minor crime scene in 2002. This sample showed an 80% match to the profile they had of the killer, which implied that the offender was a relative of Bible John.

== Other suspected crimes ==
=== Murder of Maureen Mulcahy ===
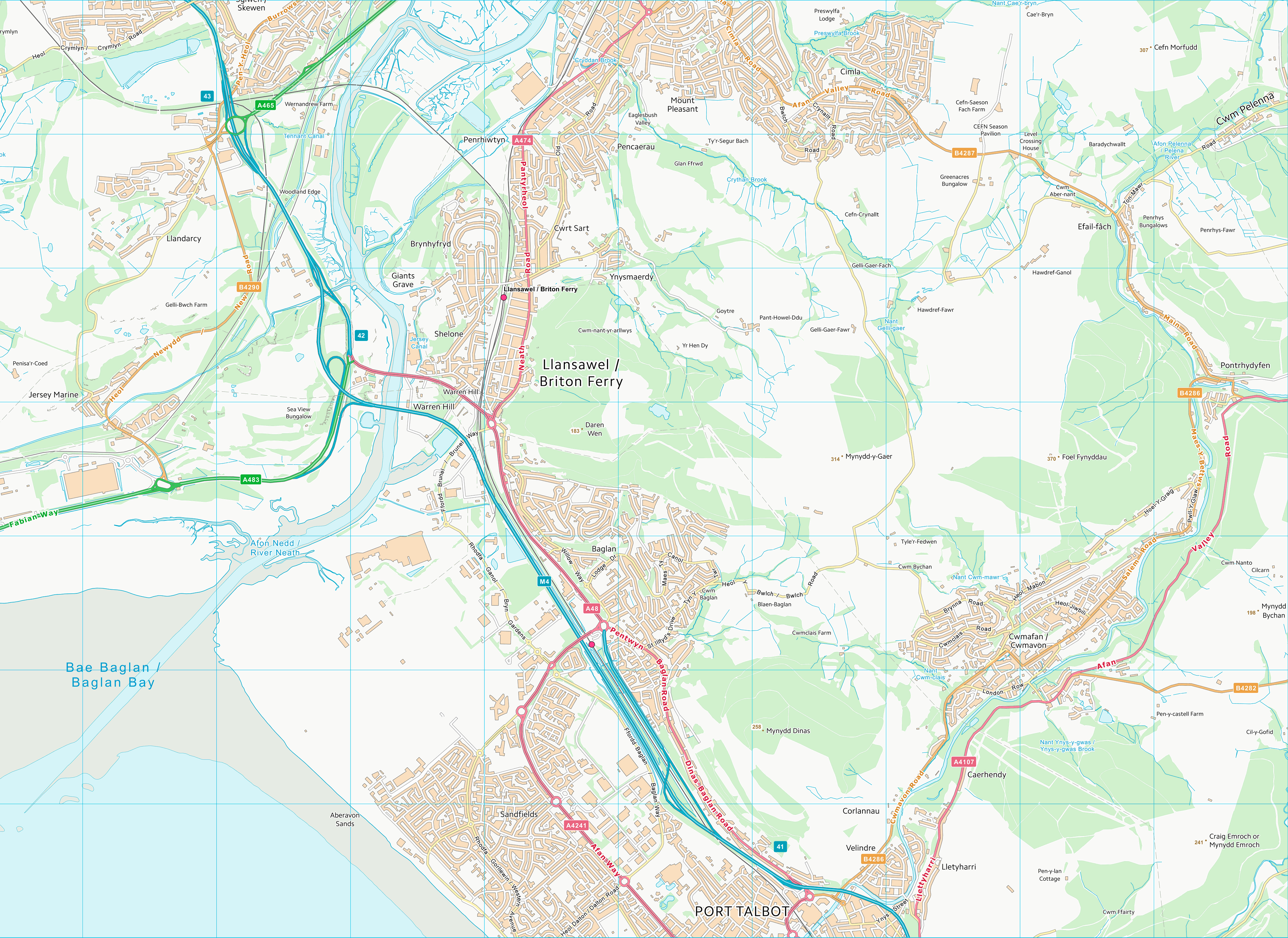
The locations where Kappen's known victims were found near Port Talbot, and the proximity to Maureen Mulcahy's unsolved murder

It is not known if Kappen ever killed again after September 1973, but he remains a suspect in the unsolved murder of Maureen Mulcahy, aged 23, in February 1976. Mulcahy was similarly strangled after a Saturday night out, being found dead the following morning on wasteland very close to the Sandfields estate, where "Saturday Night Strangler" Kappen was living at the time. Witness testimony points to Kappen having abducted her in a manner similar to the 1973 murders. As soon as Kappen had been identified in the 1973 cases, detectives announced their intention to speak to Mulcahy's family.

In Mulcahy's case there was no available DNA evidence in 2002 to examine or potentially link to Kappen and thus police were unable to prove or disprove his involvement. However, forensic expert Dr Colin Dark told a BBC programme about the unsolved case in 2020 that there would now be opportunities to look for DNA if the police examined the existing material, pointing out that Kappen had a very rare element of DNA that would allow him to be implicated or eliminated from the case possibly even with only a partial DNA profile from the remaining physical evidence, which the police had still kept. He also observed that police still had tapings from Mulcahy's body and clothing at the time taken to search for fibres, and these could now be examined for DNA if the police chose to.

=== Other ===
Police also reexamined the 1973 disappearance of nine-year-old Christine Markham from Scunthorpe, after learning that Kappen had worked as a lorry driver in Scunthorpe and had lived in lodgings in the Humberside area soon after the girl vanished. However, serial child abductor and killer Robert Black remains the prime suspect in the Markham case. After he was finally imprisoned in 1994, police announced their suspicions that Black had committed a number of other murders and their intention to investigate him for murders including Markham's.

Kappen is also suspected of having committed numerous other unsolved rapes.

== In popular culture ==
The Kappen case has been featured in a number of television programmes:

- In 2002, a two-part documentary titled Digging for the Truth: The Full Story of the Llandarcy Murders was shown on ITV Wales.
- In 2016, another documentary on the case was released on ITV Wales as part of the Crimes Files series.
- In 2018, a series 2 episode of Sky UK's Robbie Coltrane's Critical Evidence featured the case. The episode was titled "The Saturday Night Strangler: Joe Kappen".
- Also in 2018, a series 1 episode of Evidence of Evil was released that focused on the case titled "The Saturday Night Strangler".
- In 2019, a series 1 episode of Jackie Malton's documentary series The Real Prime Suspect was released on CBS Reality which covered the case, titled "The Saturday Night Strangler".
- In 2020, BBC One Wales released its documentary on the unsolved murder of Maureen Mulcahy in Port Talbot in 1976 and the suspected links between the case and Kappen. The documentary was part of the Dark Land: Hunting the Killers series.
- In 2022, the case was featured on Sky UK's series Forensics: Catching the Killer.
- In May 2023, the BBC aired a prime-time drama series about the solving of the Kappen case, titled Steeltown Murders.

== See also ==
- Joseph James DeAngelo, an American serial killer who was captured through familial DNA that was traced through genealogy websites
- Bible John, an unidentified 1960s Scottish serial killer who has also been the subject of identification attempts through familial DNA profiling
- Murders of Harry and Megan Tooze, some of Wales's most notorious unsolved murders
- Murder of Elizabeth McCabe, unsolved 1980 Dundee murder that occurred in very similar circumstances to Kappen's murders
- Murders of Jacqueline Ansell-Lamb and Barbara Mayo
- Murders of Eve Stratford and Lynne Weedon
- Murder of Helen Gorrie
- DNA profiling § Familial DNA searching
- List of serial killers in the United Kingdom
- Unsolved murders in the United Kingdom

== Cited works and further reading ==
- Berry-Dee, Christopher (2021). A Special Place in Hell: The World's Most Depraved Serial Killers. London: Ad Lib Publishers Ltd. ISBN 978-1-913-54375-4.
- Fox, James Allan (2015). Extreme Killing: Understanding Serial and Mass Murder. London: Sage Publishing. ISBN 978-1-483-35072-1.
- Hinton, Bob (2012). South Wales Murders. Gloucestershire: History Press Limited. ISBN 978-0-752-48389-4.
- Krimsky, Sheldon; Simoncelli, Tania (2012). Genetic Justice: DNA Data Banks, Criminal Investigations, and Civil Liberties. New York: Columbia University Press. ISBN 978-0-231-14520-6.
- Murray, Elizabeth A. (2012). Forensic Identification: Putting a Name and Face on Death. Minneapolis: Twenty-First Century Books. ISBN 978-1-467-70139-6.
- Owens, Andrew; Ellis, Christopher (2008). Killer Catchers: Fourteen True Stories of how Britain's Wickedest Murderers were Brought to Justice. London: John Blake Publishing. ISBN 978-1-844-54503-2.
- Porter, Liz (2011). Cold Case Files: Past Crimes Solved by New Forensic Science. Australia: Pan Macmillan Australia. pp. 27–43. ISBN 978-1-742-62724-3.
- Ramsland, Katherine; McGrain, Patrick N. (2010). Inside the Minds of Sexual Predators. Westport, Connecticut: Praeger Publishing. ISBN 978-0-313-37960-4.
- Wilson, Colin (1995). Written in Blood: A History of Forensic Detection. Glasgow: HarperCollins Publishers. ISBN 978-0-58620-842-7.
