= Murder of Lynette White =

1988 murder in Cardiff

- Location: 51.464639°N 3.166389°W; 7 James Street, Butetown, Cardiff, Wales
- Date: 14 February 1988
- Accused: Tony Paris, Yusef Abdullahi and Stephen Miller
- Charges: Murder
- Verdict: Guilty (later quashed)
- Convictions: Jeffrey Gafoor (4 July 2003)
- Convicted: 22 November 1990

Lynette Deborah White (5 July 1967 – 14 February 1988) was murdered in Cardiff, Wales. South Wales Police issued a photofit image of a bloodstained, white male seen in the vicinity at the time of the murder but were unable to trace the man.

In November 1988, the police charged five men with White's murder, although none of the scientific evidence discovered at the crime scene could be linked to them. In November 1990, following what was then the longest murder trial in British history, three of the men were found guilty and sentenced to life imprisonment.

In December 1992, the convictions were ruled unsafe and quashed by the Court of Appeal after it was decided that the police investigating the murder had acted improperly. The wrongful conviction of the three men has been called one of the most egregious miscarriages of justice in recent times. The police insisted that the men had been released purely on a legal technicality, that they would be seeking no other suspects, and resisted calls for the case to be reopened.

In January 2002, new DNA technology enabled forensic scientists led by Angela Gallop to obtain a reliable crime scene DNA profile. The extracted profile led police to the real killer, Jeffrey Gafoor, who confessed to White's murder and was sentenced to life imprisonment. Gafoor received a shorter minimum tariff (the length of time before a prisoner may be considered for parole) than had been given to the wrongfully convicted men, due to the reduction for a guilty plea, highlighting a controversial feature of the sentencing guidelines.

In 2004, the Independent Police Complaints Commission (IPCC) began a review of the conduct of the police during the original inquiry. Over the next 12 months around 30 people were arrested in connection with the investigation, 19 of whom were serving or retired police officers. In 2007, three of the prosecution witnesses who gave evidence at the original murder trial were convicted of perjury and sentenced to 18 months imprisonment.

In 2011, eight former police officers were charged with conspiring to pervert the course of justice. Their subsequent trial was the largest police corruption trial in British criminal history. A further four police officers were due to be tried on the same charges in 2012. In November 2011, the trial collapsed when the defence claimed that copies of files which they said they should have seen had instead been destroyed. As a result, the judge ruled that the defendants could not receive a fair trial and they were acquitted. In January 2012, the missing documents were found, still in the original box in which they had been sent to South Wales Police by the IPCC.

== Lynette White ==
White had left school without any qualifications and had been sexually abused for money since she was 14 years old. Tim Rogers, a BBC Wales journalist, interviewed White a few weeks before her murder as part of an investigation into the sexual exploitation of children. Rogers said that White was "probably the most visible prostitute working in Cardiff at the time." Acquaintances said that "she would be the first girl out at lunchtime, and the last one left at night", even working on Christmas Day. Described by friends as "pretty and popular", White earned around £100 each night. She told Rogers that she had been drugged and taken to Bristol by a gang of men who forced her into prostitution and that even after eventually making her way back to Cardiff she had found herself trapped in "a continual spiral of prostitution."

By 1988, aged 21, she was working every day to pay for her boyfriend Stephen "Pineapple" Miller's cocaine addiction. Miller, who was also her pimp, took at least £60–£90 each day from White, who was his only source of income. Each day he would drive her to where she worked, Riverside, Cardiff, before meeting with her at the "North Star" club in the evenings to collect her earnings. The two lived together at a flat in Dorset Street, Cardiff.

White went missing five days before her murder and made no contact with Miller or any of her friends or known associates. Neither her whereabouts during this period nor the reason for her disappearance have ever been ascertained. She was due to be called as a witness for the prosecution in two forthcoming trials, and it was later conjectured that she was deliberately "lying low" to avoid giving evidence. The first trial (R. v Francine Cordle) involved an allegation of attempted murder and the second (R. v Robert Gent & Eric Marasco) involved an allegation of attempting to procure the services of a 13-year-old girl for prostitution. When White disappeared, the police began actively searching for her, and a judge issued a warrant for her arrest to ensure that she attended the first trial, which was listed to commence at Cardiff Crown Court on 15 February 1988.

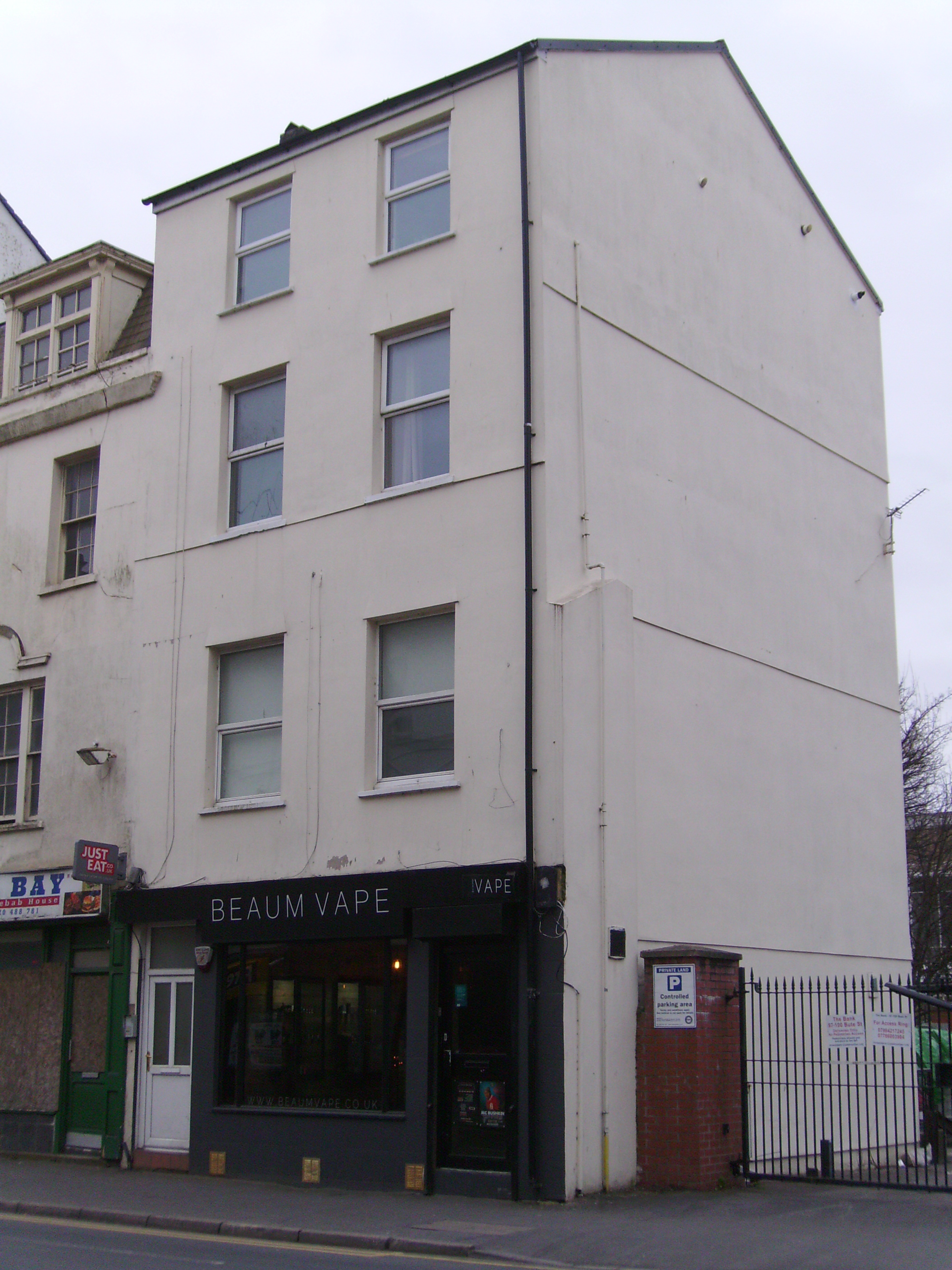
7 James Street. Now a Vape shop, previously used as a bookmaker's.

Earlier in February 1988, another prostitute, Leanne Vilday, had loaned White the keys to the flat in James Street, where she was later murdered, for the purpose of taking clients there for sex. After White disappeared, Vilday was unable to get into the flat herself without the keys and on the evening of 14 February she asked taxi driver Eddie Dimond, who knew both women, to take her to the address. There Vilday was able to get another occupant to drop a spare set of keys from a window to open the main door of the building but was still unable to enter her own flat.

Dimond and Vilday then drove to Butetown Police Station to report the situation and their concerns about White's disappearance. They returned to James Street with PS William Bisgood, PC Simon Johnson and PC Anthony Prosser, who were expecting to serve the arrest warrant on White and then take her into police custody. On arrival, Vilday and Dimond remained outside while the police forced entry and at 9.17 pm found White's body inside. PC Johnson later testified that he was aware that White was a "missing witness" in a court case and that officers had been looking for her. PC Prosser said, "We had been looking for her all weekend." He said he discovered White lying on her back on the floor of a bedroom in the flat, having suffered "massive injuries."

== Murder ==
White's throat had been cut from the right ear across the front and around to the left side of the neck, exposing the bones of the spine. There were multiple stab wounds to her chest and breasts, and other wounds to her face, stomach, arms, wrists and inner thighs, as well as defensive wounds on her hands. Bernard Knight, the pathologist who conducted White's autopsy, described it as "a mutilating attack with sexual overtones" and identified a total of 69 wounds. Although she had been stabbed seven times in the heart he concluded that it was the throat injury which had killed her. He said: "It would require considerable force because the skin, muscles, larynx and voice box had been cut right down to the neckbone."

Speculating on how the wound could have been inflicted, he said it was a normal reflex for a person to keep their head down in such a situation, and her head may have been forcibly held back for the knife wound to be inflicted. One of the two T-shirts Lynette was wearing was "absolutely lacerated. It looked like a colander." Knight believed the murder weapon was at least five inches long. He determined that she had died between midnight and 4 am. Her wristwatch had stopped at 1:45 am, leading the police to conclude that this was the most likely time of death.

White's body was discovered between the foot of the bed – the room's only furniture – and the window, still clothed but with one shoe off. There was heavy bloodstaining to the base of the bed, the carpet and the walls of the room. There was very little blood on the mattress, where an opened but unused condom was found. Forensic examination found 150 different sets of finger and palm prints in the flat. Azoospermic semen was present both in White's vagina and underwear, which pathologists determined had been deposited there within six hours of her death. Some of the blood found on White's clothing, including her exposed sock, was found to be from a male with the blood type AB.

== Investigation ==
The 1988 police E-FIT of the prime suspect, a white male, seen outside 7 James Street.

The subsequent murder inquiry was led by Detective Chief Superintendent (DCS) John Williams, the head of South Wales Police's Criminal Investigation Department (CID). Appeals for information led to several potential witnesses independently describing a white male, approximately 5'8"–5'10", aged in his mid-30s, with dark hair and a "dishevelled" appearance. He was seen in a distressed state in the vicinity of the James Street flat in the early hours of 14 February, appeared to have cut himself on the hand, and had blood on his clothing.

An E-FIT of the suspect was compiled and on 17 March 1988 DCS Williams appeared on the BBC television programme Crimewatch UK, where he stated that the police believed this man was responsible for White's murder. Williams said: "This man almost certainly had the blood of the deceased on him."

On 25 February the police detained an individual who bore a striking resemblance to the e-fit but he was released the following day after providing an alibi corroborated by a third party. The suspect seen outside the flat has never been positively identified.

=== Elimination of suspects ===
Francine Cordle, whom White had been due to testify against, and Cordle's mother, Peggy Farrugia, were also initially considered suspects, but the discovery of the blood on White's clothing allowed the police to eliminate them from their inquiries.

Stephen Miller was questioned at the beginning of the inquiry, having been picked up by the police early on 15 February, but after giving a statement detailing his whereabouts during the crucial period, he was released without charge and the police announced that he had been ruled out of their investigations. When Miller was first taken in by the police for questioning he was still wearing the clothes that he had been wearing at the time of the murder. These were dirty and unwashed – the police even joked with Miller during his initial interview that he should sit in the opposite corner of the room due to the smell of his clothing – but there were no traces of blood found on them. His car was also forensically examined with no result, and his blood type did not match that found on White's clothing. Another witness, David Orton, also gave a statement to the police detailing his movements with Miller during the time of the murder, completely corroborating Miller's alibi.

=== Mr. X ===
On 20 April 1988 DC Geoff Thomas put together a list of 12 people of interest, based on their previous criminal activities. One of the men, whose identity has never been publicly revealed and was referred to only as 'Mr X', was a convicted sex offender and paedophile who lived around twenty minutes driving distance from James Street, was known to use prostitutes, and was a frequent visitor to Cardiff. He had a history of mental illness and had been classified as a "psychopath" by his doctor. When interviewed by the police, he admitted that he had in the past paid White for sex, and was unable to account for his movements or provide an alibi for the period of the murder. Crucially for the investigating officers, Mr. X was of blood type AB.

Mr. X was interviewed by Detective Constable Paul Fish, who believed that, had he been pressed, he would have confessed to White's murder. It was decided however to adopt a "softly-softly" approach until they had DNA results from the crimescene. On 19 October 1988 Detective Inspector Graham Mouncher placed Mr. X under surveillance for three days to identify his routines and associates. The policemen's main concern was that Mr. X would voluntarily commit himself to a mental institution if he became aware of the surveillance but by 25 October DI Mouncher was so convinced that he was the killer that he requested further surveillance. This took place between 27 and 30 October 1988. On 7 November 1988 Detective Chief Inspector Adrian Morgan informed DCS Williams that Mr. X was now the prime suspect.

On 9 November 1988 the results of the DNA analysis eliminated Mr. X from the investigation.

== Constructing a case ==
=== Paul Atkins and Mark Grommek ===
Although their prime suspect had been eliminated from the inquiry, the police had collected thousands of statements through interviews and door-to-door enquiries. After the collapse of their case against Mr. X the police now returned to these. Among them were statements from Paul Atkins and Mark Grommek, two associates of Mr. X. Grommek was the tenant of the flat immediately above that where White was murdered. Both Atkins and Grommek were homosexual and had previous convictions for petty crimes, which made them, in the view of Satish Sekar, "susceptible to police pressure."

Both men gave alibis for their whereabouts at the time of the murder, but under pressure from the police Atkins eventually gave a statement on 26 April in which he first said that Grommek had killed White, and then confessed to killing her himself.

Detective Chief Inspector John Ludlow recorded that Atkins first stated that Grommek had gone to the flat to have sex with White and after hearing a scream, Atkins went downstairs and saw Grommek exiting the flat covered in blood and carrying a blood stained knife. Atkins later said he had met White himself in the Custom House pub and went back to the flat to have sex with her. He then "wrestled her to the floor, sat astride her and stabbed her." As the statement contained "four completely different accounts in the one document" it was not treated seriously.

=== Ronnie Williams ===
Yusef Abdullahi had been questioned as part of the routine door-to-door enquiries. At the time of the murder he had been working on board the ship MV Coral Sea, some 8 miles (13 km) away in Barry Docks. Although he did not realise this at the time, his common-law wife Jackie Harris was having an affair with Geoff Smith, a South Wales police officer attached to the Vice Squad. His common-law brother-in-law, Ronnie Williams, was also a police informant. Williams began passing information to the police in March 1988, much of it unreliable, including a claim that White had been stabbed in the Casablanca club in Butetown before being moved to the flat in James Street. Initially he claimed that Abdullahi knew the identity of the killer and was concealing this information but later he began to implicate him more directly with the murder, and claimed that Abdullahi had been able to leave work at the Coral Sea on the night of the murder without his colleagues being aware. It was well known by their associates and the police that Abdullahi and Williams "detested each other." On 19 May 1988 Detective Inspector Richard Powell took a formal statement from Abdullahi in which he gave details of his work on the Coral Sea.

=== Leanne Vilday ===
Leanne Vilday had also been placed under pressure during her interviews, particularly as it was she who had initially raised the alarm with the police, who felt she may be concealing information. She was a single parent, a lesbian, a drug addict, and a prostitute. The police were visiting her daily, leading to her being asked to leave the flat she shared with her friend, Angela Psaila, who was also a prostitute. She began lodging with another couple, who also complained that the police were calling round to speak with Vilday on an almost daily basis.

On 19 May 1988, while drunk, Vilday eventually named Miller and Yusef Abdullahi as the killers in front of several other prostitutes. That evening she was questioned by PS David Hathaway and agreed that she had named the two men while drunk, but said this was a false accusation as a result of "drunken rambling" and that she had heard the names from DI Powell when he had questioned her earlier in the day. She was then asked by the police if she would agree to be hypnotised, and a session with a hypnotherapist was scheduled.

=== Violet Perriam ===
Violet Elizabeth Perriam was a secretary at a Cardiff yacht club. On 10 November 1988, the day after Mr. X was cleared of any involvement, Perriam gave a statement to the police that she had been driving home from the club and had passed 7 James Street at around 1.30 am on the night that White was murdered. She claimed that she saw four "excited" black males outside the building, "arguing and gesticulating," and recognised two of them as John Actie and Rashid Omar, who was of mixed-race.

John Actie had earlier responded to the door-to-door enquiries and told the police that on the night of the murder he had gone to the Casablanca club at around midnight, and had left there at around 3.30 am. John Actie was the cousin of Leanne Vilday's boyfriend, Ronnie Actie. Perriam's statement was the "breakthrough" needed by the police and her allegation that she saw John Actie and others "at or near the scene of the murder" allowed the investigation to take a new direction after it had reached an impasse following the elimination of Mr. X.

=== Angela Psaila ===
Angela Psaila lived in a flat at St Clare's Court, Butetown, which had an unrestricted view of the front of 7 James Street. Described later as "one of the most vulnerable members of Cardiff society", Psaila had an IQ of just 55, indicating mild intellectual disability. Armed with Perriam's statement placing the group of black men outside the flat at the time of the murder, the police questioned Psaila on 17 November 1988 and insisted that she was somehow connected with the crime. In the first of two statements taken that day, Psaila claimed that Miller visited her at about 1 am on 14 February looking for White. Two and a half hours later she gave another statement claiming that she saw Miller, John and Ronnie Actie, Abdullahi, Tony Paris and Tony Brace (a doorman from the North Star club) outside 7 James Street. She also claimed to have heard screams from the flat and to have seen Ronnie Actie talking up to someone in the window of Grommek's flat before being let into the building. As part of the 2021 three-part BBC documentary A Killing in Tiger Bay the supposed screaming was reconstructed, using an actress in White's former flat and sensitive sound recording equipment placed at Psaila's former flat. Even with no background noise, the screams were barely audible.

The same day, Grommek and Atkins gave new statements to the police saying that they had also seen a group of men outside the flat, including Ronnie Actie and Abdullahi. During his first interview, in the morning, Grommek had stated that he knew nothing about the murder but by the afternoon he had given a very detailed account of the circumstances surrounding the crime. Grommek also said that he had opened the door to the building to let Ronnie Actie in, and both he and Atkins now claimed that they too had heard screams that night.

=== Psaila and Vilday: December statements ===
Psaila gave a new statement to the police on 6 December 1988. In this account, she had been present at St Clare's Court with Leanne Vilday and on hearing the screams the two had gone to 7 James Street. In what Sekar called "a most remarkable coincidence", Vilday, Grommek and Atkins all decided independently to go to the police that day and give new accounts of the murder. Vilday said that on hearing the screams she had gone to the flat and found White dead inside. In the room were Miller, Abdullahi, Ronnie Actie, Tony Miller (Stephen Miller's brother) and an unnamed man of mixed-race. Grommek and Atkins gave statements which corroborated this new version of events. Psaila and Vilday were then taken into protective custody.

On 7 December 1988, the police arrested Stephen and Tony Miller, Yusef Abdullahi, Ronnie Actie, Rashid Omar and Martin Tucker. John Actie and Tony Paris were arrested on 9 December. No forensic evidence had been found to link any of the men with the crime scene.

The police were notified on 10 December that Psaila's blood type was AB, the same as that found on White's sock and trousers. They reinterviewed her the following day, insisting that it was her blood that was found on White. Psaila gave a new version of events, this time claiming that she and Vilday had been present when White was murdered, and had taken part in the killing. She named Stephen and Tony Miller, Ronnie and John Actie, Tony Paris and Abdullahi as the other killers, and said Vilday had been responsible for cutting White's throat.

Vilday then gave a new statement on the same day, naming Stephen Miller, Ronnie and John Actie, Abdullahi and Paris as the killers, and saying that she and Psaila had both been forced to cut one of White's wrists to ensure their complicity and silence.

== Stephen Miller's confession ==
Over a period of four days, Stephen Miller was interviewed on 19 occasions for a total of 13 hours; he was denied access to a solicitor for the first two interviews. Miller, who had a mental age of 11, confessed to the killing after making 307 denials. Miller also implicated the other men.

== Murder trial ==
The trial commenced at Swansea Crown Court on 5 October 1989, but was interrupted on 26 February 1990 – after 82 days of evidence – by the sudden death of the judge, Mr Justice McNeill, from a heart attack. The subsequent retrial, also held at Swansea, commenced on 14 May 1990 before Mr Justice Leonard. It was at the time the longest murder trial in British legal history, lasting 197 days. On 22 November 1990, three of the five accused were found guilty of White's murder. Tony Paris, Yusef Abdullahi and Stephen Miller – who became known as the "Cardiff Three" – were each sentenced to life imprisonment. Cousins Ronnie and John Actie were acquitted of the murder; both had spent two years in custody. 17 years later, in September 2007, Ronnie was found dead in his back garden; police said there were no suspicious circumstances.

Evidence concerning the unreliability of the taped police confession of Stephen Miller was given by Icelandic-British academic, forensic psychologist and former detective Gísli Guðjónsson.

=== Doubts about the convictions ===
In early 1991 a number of journalists began to question the safety of the convictions and commercial television broadcaster Channel 4 transmitted their own investigation of the case in "Butetown: The Bridge And The Boys", part of their Black Bag magazine and documentary series aimed at Black and Asian viewers. In May 1991 two of the convicted men were granted leave to appeal their convictions, but the third, Stephen Miller, was refused. Satish Sekar, an investigative journalist specialising in crime and justice issues, had tracked down two witnesses not called at the trial who could provide an alibi for Miller's whereabouts at the time of the murder. Miller asked him if he would organise a new legal team to prepare his appeal. Sekar persuaded renowned solicitor Gareth Peirce to take on the case and handle the renewed application to appeal, and Peirce instructed Michael Mansfield QC to represent Miller in court.

A public campaign to overturn the convictions, started by families and friends of the three men, began to receive high-profile support, including that of American community leader Al Sharpton, and Gerry Conlon, a recently exonerated member of the "Guildford Four". Further television documentaries followed in 1992, including "Unsafe Convictions" as part of the BBC documentary series Panorama and in 2021 the three-part BBC documentary A Killing in Tiger Bay, which included first-hand accounts from Miller, Paris and John Actie, as well as from some of the defence team and expert witness Gísli Guðjónsson.

=== Appeal ===
Their appeal was heard over four days in December 1992 and ended after the Court of Appeal listened to an audio recording of Stephen Miller's police interrogation. Mansfield argued that the trial judge "was wrong to admit the evidence of Mr Miller's police interviews contained on the tapes because it was tainted by the officers' 'oppressive' conduct." The interviews were, he said, "not a search for the truth but a police attempt to achieve—by any means short of violence—a concurrence between Mr Miller's account and Ms Vilday's."

In his judgement, Lord Taylor said that the police had "bullied and hectored" Miller during a "travesty of an interview" and that "short of physical violence, it is hard to conceive of a more hostile and intimidating approach by officers to a suspect." The truthfulness of Miller's admission was, according to Taylor, "irrelevant" as the nature of the questioning "required the interview to be rejected as evidence." He ordered copies of the recording to be sent to the Director of Public Prosecutions and the Chairman of the Royal Commission on Criminal Justice as an "example of what we hope we shall never hear again in this court". All three men had their convictions declared "unsafe and unsatisfactory" and were released.

Yusef Abdullahi was treated for posttraumatic stress disorder after his release from prison and campaigned on behalf of other victims of miscarriages of justice and for the reopening of the investigation into White's murder. In 1996 he said: "Until it happens to you, no-one can have any idea what it's like to be convicted for a murder you didn't commit. We've been really messed up by what we've been through. We needed counselling, but no-one offered us any help. Being inside really did my head in." He died of a perforated ulcer in January 2011, aged 49.

== Case reopened ==
In September 2000, the case was reopened. Forensic scientists led by Angela Gallop discovered fresh evidence, including a small trace of blood on the cellophane wrapper from a cigarette packet and a further ten traces of the same blood underneath several layers of paint on a skirting board at the crime scene. The killer was dubbed "Cellophane Man" by scientists and detectives. No match was found in the United Kingdom National DNA Database.

== Identification of the murderer ==
In January 2002, after the development of the Second Generation Multiplex Plus (SGM+) test, forensic scientists, led by Professor Angela Gallop, were finally able to obtain a reliable crime scene DNA profile. Hopes were also raised of solving the case when in the same year South Wales Police were able to positively identify a historical Port Talbot serial killer, Joe Kappen, using the pioneering approach of familial DNA searching. He had been unmasked as the killer after forensic samples from three 1973 murder victims were found to match his living son, and detectives on the White case hoped techniques could be used in their case.

Using this process of familial searching, a partial match was eventually made with the profile of a 14-year-old youth who was known to the police but who had not been born at the time of the murder of White. This led to the arrest on 28 February 2003 of Jeffrey Gafoor, who was the youth's uncle. Gafoor was prosecuted for the murder in July 2003. On 4 July 2003, at Cardiff Crown Court, he pleaded guilty to White's murder and the judge, Mr Justice Royce, sentenced him to life imprisonment, with a minimum tariff of twelve years and eight months.

== Independent Police Complaints Commission investigation ==
In November 2004, the IPCC announced that it would supervise a reinvestigation by the South Wales Police into the original police inquiry. On 13 April 2005, five retired police officers were arrested in connection with offences of false imprisonment, conspiring to pervert the course of justice and misconduct in public office. Four more retired police officers were arrested in connection with their roles in the original murder investigation on 21 April 2005. Along with the officers, a further 13 people were arrested in connection with evidence and information that they had provided in 1988 which had incriminated the three convicted men. On 19 May 2005, three serving police officers – a Detective Constable, a Constable and a Detective Sergeant – were arrested. As the investigation continued, over 30 arrests had been made by November 2005, 19 of whom were serving or retired police officers, including one Inspector.

== Legal actions arising from the wrongful convictions ==
=== 2008: Perjury trial ===
In February 2007, four witnesses who gave evidence at the original murder trial were charged with perjury. In December 2008, three of the accused – Angela Psaila, Leanne Vilday and Mark Grommek – were found guilty of committing perjury and each sentenced to 18 months imprisonment. The fourth, Paul Atkins, was deemed "unfit to stand trial." Mr Justice Maddison, sentencing, said: "It's been submitted on your behalf, accepted by the prosecution, and I accept it myself... you were seriously hounded, bullied, threatened, abused and manipulated by the police during a period of several months leading up to late 1988, as a result of which you felt compelled to agree to false accounts they suggested to you." However, perjury was "an offence which strikes at the heart of the system of the administration of justice."

=== 2011: Police corruption trial ===
In March 2009, the Special Crime Division of the Crown Prosecution Service (CPS) announced that there was "sufficient evidence" to prosecute three serving officers and ten former officers involved in the original investigation with conspiracy to pervert the course of justice. Two further witnesses in the original trial, Violet Perriam and Ian Massey, were also charged with perjury. In July 2011 the trial (R v Mouncher and Others)—the largest police corruption trial in British criminal history—of Chief Inspectors Graham Mouncher and Richard Powell, Inspector Thomas Page, Detectives Michael Daniels, Paul Jennings, Paul Stephen, Peter Greenwood and John Seaford, and Violet Perriam and Ian Massey, commenced at Swansea Crown Court. Massey was a convicted armed robber incarcerated at HM Prison Cardiff at the same time as Tony Paris and John Actie. He agreed to act as a police informant against the men in return for "representations made by the police" to his forthcoming Parole Board hearing, and gave evidence at their trial that Paris had confessed to White's murder in his presence.

During the trial, "concerns had been almost continually raised" by defence counsel relating to alleged non-disclosure by the prosecution of relevant documents. On 28 November 2011, Mr Justice Sweeney ordered the prosecution to produce to him a number of specific documents requested by the defence. Four of the documents were "found to be missing from their expected location" and an initial investigation by the police concluded that the documents had been destroyed in 2010 on the instructions of Detective Chief Superintendent Christopher Coutts. As a result, Nicholas Dean QC, leading counsel for the prosecution, informed the court, on 1 December 2011, that "the prosecution can no longer sustain a position maintaining that the court and the defendants can have the required confidence in the disclosure process, the confidence that my Lord has referred to with all its importance to our criminal justice system. In those circumstances I formally offer no further evidence and will invite my Lord to direct the jury to return not guilty verdicts."

The decision was made at the highest level, by Keir Starmer, at the time the Director of Public Prosecutions, Head of the Crown Prosecution Service and the most senior public prosecutor in England and Wales. The trial collapsed and South Wales Police immediately announced referral to the IPCC for further investigation. Starmer said: "Prosecutions will stand or fall on the quality of disclosure, and failings can leave the court with no choice but to acquit defendants who have a case to answer." On 17 January 2012, the missing documents were found in the office of DCS Coutts, still in the original box in which they had been sent from the IPCC.

Sekar responded to the acquittals by saying: "It is a very, very sad day for justice, as it suggests you cannot ever prosecute police officers successfully if you can't do it in a case like this." Tom Mangold, the BBC journalist and broadcaster who covered the case for Panorama in 1992 and 2012, called it "the biggest scandal in the history of British justice." Mangold also noted: "If the 13 accused Cardiff detectives had been found guilty, presumably all their previous cases — hundreds — would have had to be reopened and re-examined. Instead, they are now considering suing the South Wales Police." By the time the trial collapsed, all of the police officers charged had been allowed to retire.

=== 2015: Horwell investigation ===
In February 2015, then Home Secretary Theresa May announced that an investigation into the collapse of the police corruption trial would be carried out, led by Richard Horwell QC. May, who rejected calls for a full public inquiry, said: "There are still unresolved questions surrounding the reasons why no-one was found responsible for this appalling miscarriage of justice." The inquiry was expected to present its findings in the summer of 2015 but this was delayed by the civil actions brought by former officers against South Wales Police.

=== 2015: Civil action against South Wales Police ===
Following the collapse of the corruption trial, eight former police officers and seven others sued South Wales Police for damage to their reputations. The action alleged malicious prosecution, false imprisonment and misfeasance in public office by South Wales Police. On 14 June 2016, Mr Justice Wyn Williams ruled that the force "was within its rights to investigate the officers" and dismissed the case. He said: "I find it very difficult to understand how the accounts emerged as they did if no police officer was instrumental in what occurred. I have reached the clear conclusion that reasonable grounds existed from the start of LW3 [the inquiry into police corruption] to suspect that the untruthful accounts which the core four [Psaila, Vilday, Grommek and Atkins] gave about the involvement of the original defendants in Lynette's murder were brought about by criminal conduct on the part of police officers involved in LW1 [the original murder investigation]. In my judgment, it was permissible for LW3 officers to suspect that officers who had been part of LW1 had engaged in a conspiracy to mould and manipulate evidence." Furthermore, the explanation given by Chief Superintendent Thomas Page regarding documents that he had burned in his garden prior to his arrest, was, according to the judge, "open to considerable doubt".

== See also ==
- List of miscarriage of justice cases
- Murders of Harry and Megan Tooze – Welsh case the team that solved the White case were called to review after the conviction of Gafoor
- Joseph Kappen – a Port Talbot man who was in 2002 posthumously identified by South Wales Police as the "Saturday Night Strangler" serial killer using familial DNA searching. His case proved the inspiration for the familial DNA searching techniques used to unmask Gafoor as the killer
- Presumption of guilt

Other (active) UK cold cases where the offender's DNA is known:

- Murder of Deborah Linsley
- Murders of Eve Stratford and Lynne Weedon
- Murder of Lisa Hession
- Murders of Jacqueline Ansell-Lamb and Barbara Mayo
- Murder of Lindsay Rimer
- Murder of Julie Pacey
- Murder of Janet Brown
- Murder of Sheila Anderson
- Murder of Linda Cook
- Murder of Melanie Hall
- Batman rapist – subject to Britain's longest-running serial rape investigation
