= Satish Sekar =

British journalist

- Born: London, England, United Kingdom, UK
- Education: Thames Polytechnic
- Occupations: Author, journalist and consultant in forensic evidence
- Notable work: Fitted In: The Cardiff 3 and the Lynette White Inquiry

Satish C. Sekar is a British author and journalist, and a consultant in forensic evidence. Sekar has specialised since the 1990s in the investigation of miscarriages of justice. His work has been published in newspapers including The Guardian, The Independent and Private Eye, and he has also worked for television documentaries including Panorama and Trial and Error.

== Early life ==
Sekar was educated at Reynolds High School, Acton, and Thames Polytechnic (now the University of Greenwich), where he studied sociology. He has one brother, Chandra Sekar, a barrister.

== Career ==
In 1992, Sekar's work helped overturn the convictions of the Cardiff Three, and while researching for a book about the case, Fitted In: The Cardiff 3 and the Lynette White Inquiry, he uncovered errors in the original evaluation of forensic evidence from the crime scene. His submissions to the Home Office about the DNA evidence were instrumental in getting the case reopened and the eventual extraction of a DNA profile which led to the arrest and conviction of the real killer, Jeffrey Gafoor, in 2003. The Australian and New Zealand Journal of Criminology said that Sekar's "extraordinary work on the case of the Cardiff 3 [put] academic criminology to shame."

In 2010, Sekar founded The Fitted-In Project, a not-for-profit organisation that conducts projects on justice issues that have not had the attention they deserve.

== Bibliography ==
- Fitted In: The Cardiff 3 and the Lynette White Inquiry (1997)
- The Cardiff Five: Innocent Beyond Any Doubt (2012) (Waterside Books)
- The Cardiff Five: Innocent Beyond Any Doubt (2017) (2nd edition) (Waterside Books)
- Trials and Tribulations: Innocence Matters? (2017)
- Forensic Pathology: Preventing Wrongs (2019)
- Bad Form: How Tariffs Protect the Guilty and Punish the Innocent (forthcoming)
