= Stradey Park Cricket Ground =

Cricket ground in Llanelli, Wales

Coordinates: 51.68803°N 4.17498°W

Stradey Park
Ground information
- Location: Llanelli, Carmarthenshire
- Establishment: 1861 (first recorded match)
- Capacity: 7,500

Team information
Carmarthenshire	(1908-1911)
Glamorgan	(1933-1939, 1949-1965 & 1988-1993)
Wales Minor Counties	(1991)
- As of 21 August 2010; Source: Ground profile

Stradey Park is a cricket ground in Llanelli, Carmarthenshire. The first recorded match on the ground was in 1861, when Carmarthenshire played Glamorganshire.

A venue of Llanelli Cricket Club since the 1870s, Stradey Park Rugby Stadium, which adjoins the cricket ground was selected as part of the 1887 Home Nations Championship, with the opening home match for Wales being against England. The game was arranged for the 8 January and a temporary stand was erected to allow a seating area so the club could charge higher ticket prices; but on the day the English team refused to play on the ground as the pitch was frozen. The cricket ground being in better condition was pulled into action, so the match was moved there along with the entire crowd of 8,000, many members of which were extremely unhappy as they lost their seating area.

The ground was first used for a Minor Counties Championship match when Carmarthenshire played Monmouthshire in 1908. From 1908 to 1911, the ground hosted 13 Minor Counties Championship matches, with the final Minor Counties Championship fixture Carmarthenshire played on the ground coming against Buckinghamshire.

The ground was first used for first-class matches in 1933, when Glamorgan played Worcestershire in the County Championship. From 1933 to 1965, the ground hosted 23 first-class matches, the last of which was between Glamorgan and Essex. County Championship cricket at the ground ended in 1965 when Glamorgan opted to concentrate their western fixtures on Swansea and Neath. Glamorgan later returned to the ground, in the capacity to play List-A matches. The first List-A match on the ground saw Glamorgan play Leicestershire in the 1988 Refuge Assurance League. From 1988 to 1993, the ground held 5 List-A matches, with the final List-A match seeing Glamorgan play Sussex in the 1993 AXA Equity and Law League.

The ground was used in 1991 by Wales Minor Counties when they played Oxfordshire in the Minor Counties Championship. In local domestic cricket, the ground is the home venue of Llanelli Cricket Club.
