= Coed Darcy =

Village in Neath Port Talbot, Wales

Coordinates: 51.64713°N 3.85791°W

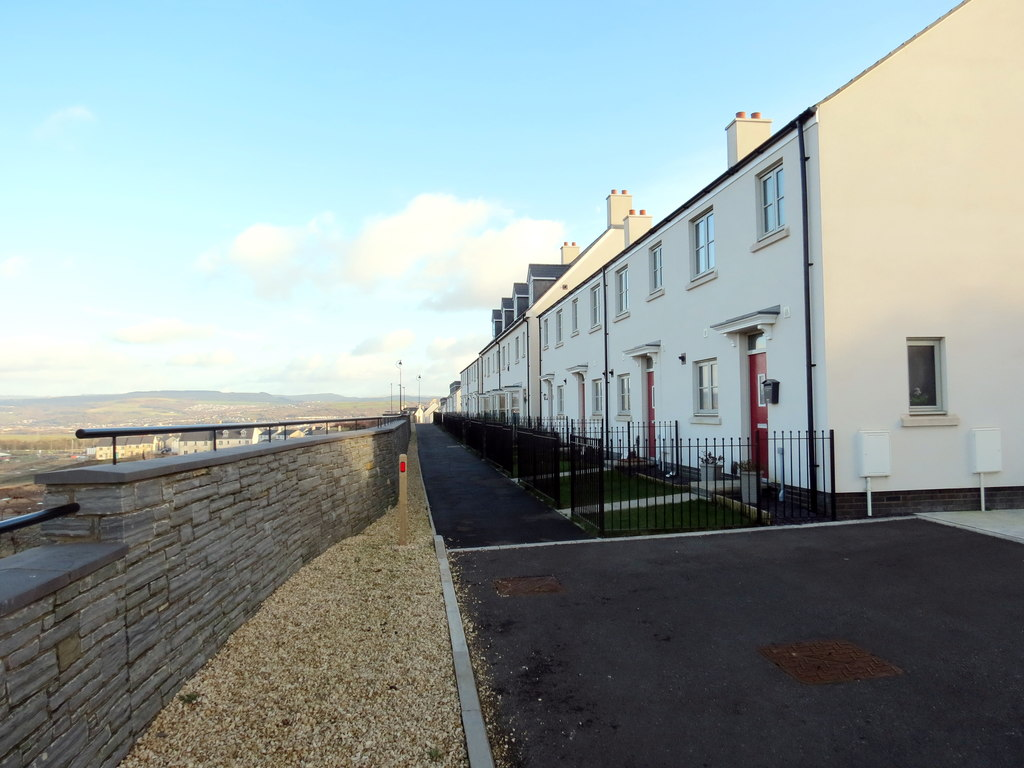
- Houses along the Ridgeway (2020)

- Location within Neath Port Talbot
- OS grid reference: SS715958
- Principal area: Neath Port Talbot
- Preserved county: West Glamorgan
- Country: Wales
- Sovereign state: United Kingdom
- Post town: NEATH
- Postcode district: SA10
- Police: South Wales
- Fire: Mid and West Wales
- Ambulance: Welsh
- UK Parliament: Aberafan Maesteg
- Senedd Cymru – Welsh Parliament: Aberavon

Coed Darcy is a new village under development on brownfield land adjacent to Llandarcy in Neath Port Talbot county borough, Wales. Development began in the mid-2000s and was expected to take approximately twenty years. The then Prince Charles visited the site in 2013 after completion of the first phase, but development was paused after fewer than 300 of 4,000 homes had been built, and only an estate at the former refinery entrance has been occupied.

== Historical background ==
Coed Darcy is being built on brownfield land vacated by a former oil refinery, the Llandarcy Oil Refinery, owned by BP. The first crude oil refinery in the UK, Llandarcy Refinery was constructed between 1918 and 1922 and produced diesel, kerosene and other products. During the post-war period, the refinery underwent large-scale development as demand for products increased to 340,000 tonnes per year, but because of economic changes, its closure was announced in 1997.

== Planned development ==
The planned community of Coed Darcy, within the refinery site, was estimated to cost £1.2 billion and was to comprise 4,000 homes, community facilities, employment space and open space covering 1,300 acres (5.3 km^{2}). Four new schools (1 Welsh primary, 2 English primaries and 1 secondary) were planned. The development proposals include a new southern access road linking the village to the Fabian Way (A483) into Swansea. The village was planned to have an approximate population of 10,000 when complete. Construction was expected to create as many as 4,000 jobs, and to be completed in approximately 20 years, by 2028.

The development was masterplanned by Alan Baxter. The design specification was developed with input from The Prince's Foundation, and the village was to be developed as an urban village in a similar fashion to Poundbury, with the intention of encouraging people to live and work in the same community. The then Prince Charles visited the site in July 2013.

The name of the village (which translates as 'Darcy's Woodland') was suggested by members of Coedffranc Community Council; it combines the first element of the name of the local parish, Coedffranc, and the second element of the name of the neighbouring village of Llandarcy.

On 8 May 2007, it was announced that St. Modwen Properties was appointed as the preferred developer of the site. Reclamation and remediation of the brownfield site under their lead was planned to take seven years. The reclamation work involves removing the remaining oil refinery infrastructure such as pipeworks, buildings and roads, including the draining of a large reservoir at the northern part of the site. The remediation work involves removing contaminated material from the land which was deposited when the refinery was in operation. The site was turned over to St. Modwen in June 2008 after initial land preparation.

The development of the village has not been devoid of controversy. The residents' association of the neighbouring village of Llandarcy were concerned that Coed Darcy might swallow up Llandarcy. Concerns were expressed about the development and the new access road using some green belt land in addition to the brownfield site, and the Countryside Council for Wales was monitoring the development of the village.

=== Area One ===
Work started in June 2008 on building the first 150 houses and 58 apartments, on a 10.4 acres (42,000 m^{2}) section of the site at the former refinery main entrance which is designated Area One. The first properties, designed in emulation of oil workers' housing in Llandarcy by Robert Adam, Director at ADAM Architecture, were developed by Edward Ware Homes and Atlantic Properties Plc (Atlantic Ware Developments) with construction being carried out by Dawnus. Area One was marketed as Heritage Gate. By November 2012, 60 houses had been built.

=== Main site ===
Construction work on the main site, where 302 houses were to be built in the first of three residential neighbourhoods making up the village, was originally scheduled to start in spring 2011; it began in November 2012.

== Cessation of work ==
Work was subsequently paused for unknown reasons, after 294 homes were built. The main site was never occupied, and the buildings there have deteriorated. STM Brighton Group, a subsidiary of Revantage, performed remediation work at the site and in November 2021 applied for planning permission for 1,800 homes and a small group of shops, with land set aside for a primary school, but no agreement has been reached on how best to develop the site.
