= Carmarthenshire County Cricket Club =

Cricket club in Wales (1908–1911)

Carmarthenshire County Cricket Club was a county cricket club based in the historic Welsh county of Carmarthenshire that competed in the Minor Counties championship from 1908 to 1911, without success. The Minor Counties had a divisional structure at the time and Carmarthenshire was grouped with other Welsh and West of England sides.

Most of the home matches were played at Stradey Park Cricket Ground in Llanelli, opposite the more famous rugby union venue, Stradey Park. The county also played three matches at Llandovery College.

== Notable players ==
See Category:Carmarthenshire cricketers
