= Vicarage Field, Aberystwyth =

Cricket ground in Aberystwyth

Coordinates: 52°24′44.08″N 4°04′26.22″W

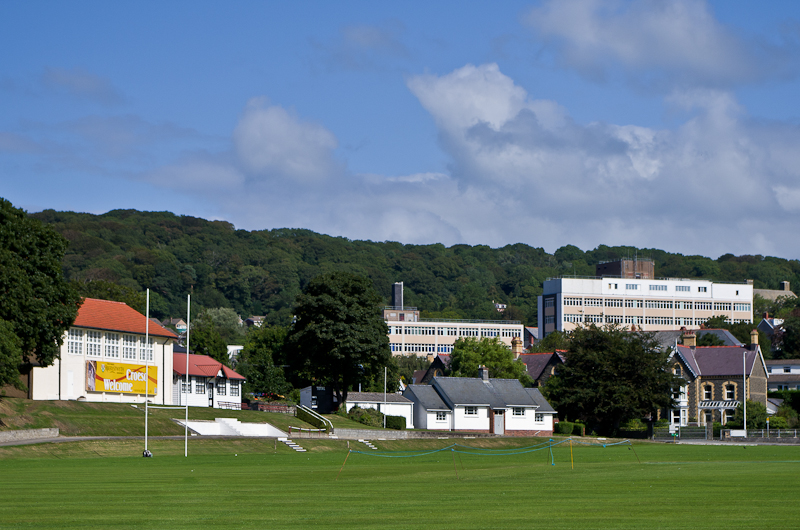
Vicarage Field

Vicarage Field is a cricket ground in Aberystwyth, Wales used by Glamorgan for two Sunday League matches in 1977 (against Essex) and 1989 (against Warwickshire). It was the host ground of the Olympic torch relay's 9th day Evening Celebrations featuring world class dance act Twist and Pulse

The ground hosted 2 List A matches.

Game Information:

Game Type	No. of Games
County Championship Matches	0
Limited-over county matches	2
Twenty20 matches	0

Game Statistics: one-day:

Category	Information
Highest Team Score	Essex (234/7 in 40 overs against Glamorgan) in 1977
Lowest Team Score	Glamorgan (203/4 in 40 overs against Warwickshire) in 1989
Best Batting Performance	Hugh Morris (83 Runs for Glamorgan against Warwickshire in 1989
Best Bowling Performance	Gwyn Richards (3/42 for Glamorgan against Essex) in 1977
