= Mynydd Drumau =

Hill in Wales

Coordinates: 51.68514°N 3.84574°W

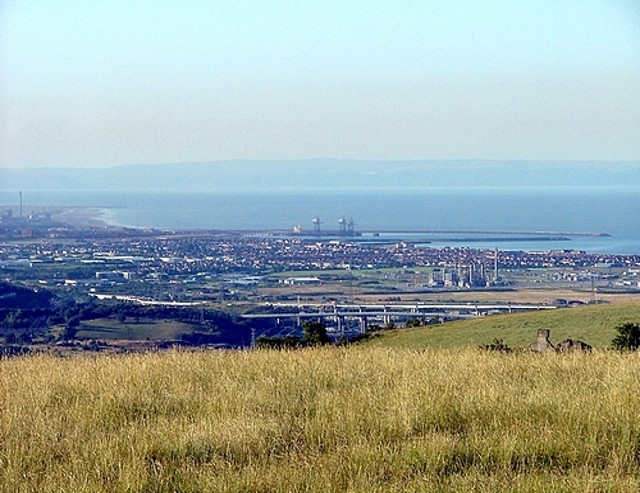
Baglan Bay from the summit of Mynydd Drumau

Mynydd Drumau (meaning "mountain of the ridges" in English) is a hill in south Wales lying on the border between Swansea and the county of Neath Port Talbot.

It is 272m / 892 ft high, and is a Marilyn. The hill is situated in a suburban and rural upland zone and is dotted with a number of farms and woodlands.

Villages and suburbs lining the foot of the hill include: Skewen, Birchgrove, Bryncoch, Rhos and Glais.
