= BP Oil Refinery Ltd Ground =

Cricket ground in Llandarcy, Wales

Coordinates: 51.64467°N 3.85156°W

Ground information
- Location: Llandarcy, Neath Port Talbot
- Establishment: 1950 (first recorded match)

Team information
Glamorgan	(1971)
- As of 11 September 2010; Source: Ground profile

BP Oil Refinery Ltd Ground is a cricket ground in Llandarcy, Neath Port Talbot, Wales. The first recorded match on the ground was in 1950, when the Glamorgan Second XI played the Gloucestershire Second XI in the 1950 Minor Counties Championship. The ground has held a further 19 Second XI fixtures for the Glamorgan Second XI in both the Second XI Championship and Second XI Trophy.

Glamorgan played Oxford University in a first-class match in 1971, the only first-class match that the ground has held.

In local domestic cricket, the ground is the home venue of Llandarcy Cricket Club.
