= Ynysangharad Park =

Cricket ground in Pontypridd

Coordinates: 51.600564°N 3.33596°W

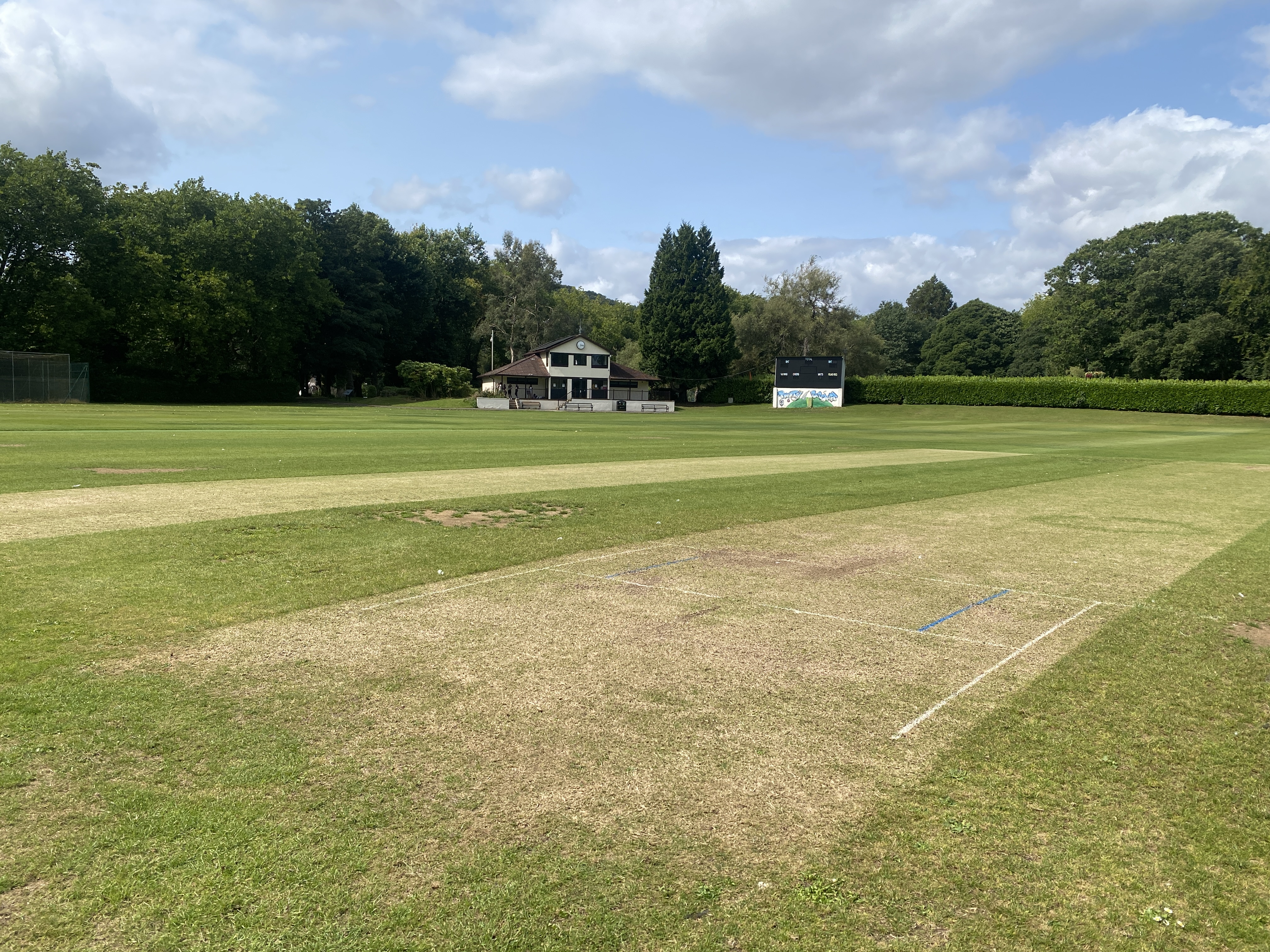
- Interactive map of Ynysangharad Park

Ground information
- Location: Pontypridd, Glamorgan
- Country: Wales
- Establishment: 1870
- Capacity: 5,000
- End names
- River End; Nursery End

Team information
Glamorgan	(1926–1962, 1988–1999)
Wales Minor Counties	(1995–1997 & 2003–2004)
- As of 11 September 2010; Source: Ground profile

Ynysangharad Park is a cricket ground in the centre of Pontypridd, Rhondda Cynon Taf, Wales. It is located in Ynysangharad War Memorial Park.

The ground was first established in 1870, but the first recorded match on the ground was in 1924, when Glamorgan played their first first-class match there against Derbyshire. Glamorgan played 43 first-class matches at the ground between 1926 and 1996, playing their final first-class match there against Pakistan during their tour of England.

The ground has also held List-A matches. The first List-A match came in the 1970 John Player League between Glamorgan and Essex. Between 1970 and 1999, the ground played host to 9 List-A matches, the last of which saw Glamorgan play Surrey in the 1999 National League.

As well as hosting first-class and List-A cricket, the ground has also held Minor counties matches for Wales Minor Counties. Their first match at the ground came in the 1995 Minor Counties Championship against Oxfordshire. Wales Minor Counties played 5 matches there in the Minor Counties Championship between 1995 and 2004, the last of which saw them play Devon.

In local domestic cricket, the ground is the home venue of Pontypridd Cricket Club.
