= Cowbridge Cricket Ground =

Cricket ground in Glamorgan, Wales

Coordinates: 51.46449°N 3.45203°W

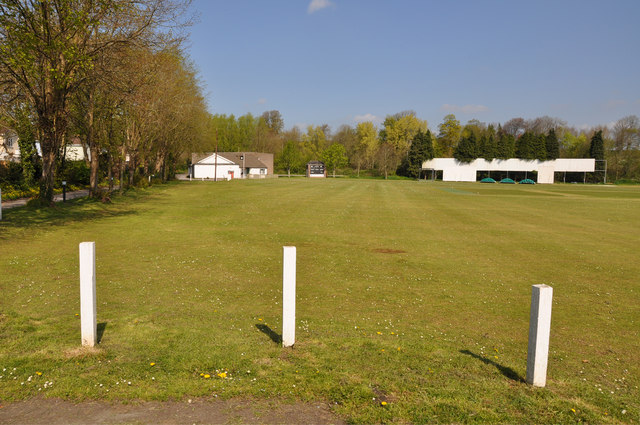

Ground information
- Location: Cowbridge, Glamorgan
- Establishment: 1931

Team information
Glamorgan	(1931-1932)
- As of 11 September 2010; Source: Ground profile

Cowbridge Cricket Ground is a cricket ground in Cowbridge, Glamorgan. The first recorded match held on the ground came in 1895 when the creator of the ground, E H Ebsworth's XI played The Rev'd Owen Jones' XI.

== Overview ==
The early years saw the ground being used by the Ebsworth XI, The Glamorgan Gypsies and Cowbridge Wanderers. The Wanderers were given the opportunity to purchase the ground at a price significantly less than the original cost and construction. The Wanderers were re-formed into The Cowbridge and District Athletic Club which remains the parent body to the sporting sections. Glamorgan played Northamptonshire in a ground first first-class match in the 1931 County Championship. In 1931 and 1932, the ground played host to four first-class matches, two each season, the last of which saw Glamorgan play Somerset.

In local domestic cricket, the ground is the home venue of Cowbridge Cricket Club.
