= Steel Company of Wales Ground =

Cricket ground in Margam, Wales

Coordinates: 51.56673°N 3.74838°W

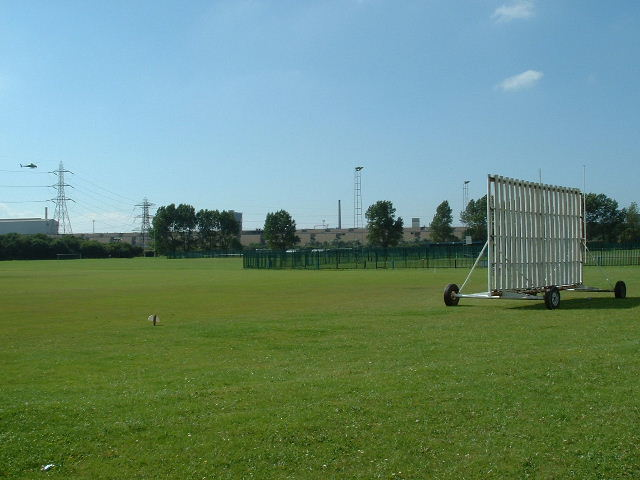

Ground information
- Location: Margam, Glamorgan
- Establishment: 1946

Team information
Glamorgan	(1953 & 1960–1963)
- As of 11 September 2010; Source: Ground profile

Steel Company of Wales Ground is a cricket ground in Margam, Glamorgan. The ground was initially built and owned by the Steel Company of Wales for the workers at the nearby Port Talbot Steelworks. The first recorded match on the ground was in 1949, when Margam played Glamorgan Club and Ground.

In 1953, Glamorgan played their first first-class match there against Ireland. Glamorgan returned to the ground in 1960, and between 1960 and 1963 they played 4 first-class matches at the ground, playing their final first-class match there against Cambridge University.

The ground is still in use to this day.
