= Hoover's Sports Ground =

Defunct cricket ground in Wales

Coordinates: 51.72649°N 3.36357°W

Ground information
- Location: Merthyr Tydfil, Wales
- Establishment: 1953

Team information
| Glamorgan | (1988-1989) |
- As of 11 September 2010; Source: Ground profile

Hoover's Sports Ground was a cricket ground in Merthyr Tydfil, Wales. The site of the ground was previously the site of a disused railway siding. The Hoover Company, a major employer in the town, bought the site and levelled it. A cricket ground with changing facilities was constructed, with the square being ready by 1953. The first recorded match held on the ground came 1959, when Somerset, Ebbw Vale and Hoovers XI played Glamorgan.

In 1988, Glamorgan played Kent in a List-A match in the 1988 Refuge Assurance League. The following season the ground held its second and final List-A match when Glamorgan played Middlesex in the 1989 Refuge Assurance League.

Following the 2009 season, the ground became disused.
