= Skewen =

Coordinates: 51.6609°N 3.8399°W

Skewen: Welsh: Sgiwen
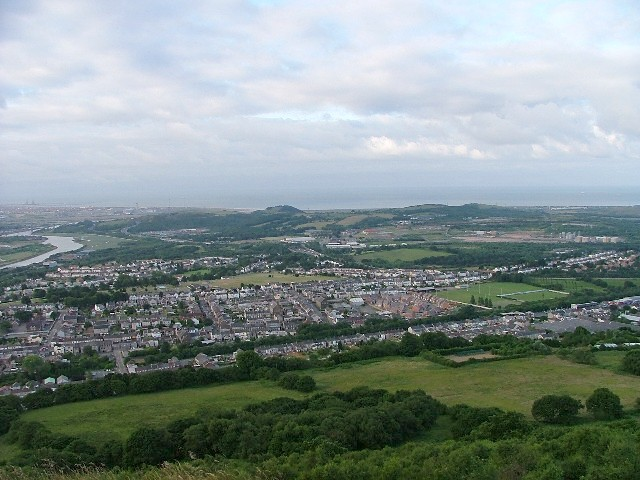
- A view over Skewen

- Location within Neath Port Talbot
- Population: 8,500
- OS grid reference: SS727974
- Principal area: Neath Port Talbot
- Preserved county: West Glamorgan
- Country: Wales
- Sovereign state: United Kingdom
- Post town: NEATH
- Postcode district: SA10
- Dialling code: 01792
- Police: South Wales
- Fire: Mid and West Wales
- Ambulance: Welsh
- UK Parliament: Neath and Swansea East
- Senedd Cymru – Welsh Parliament: Brycheiniog Tawe Nedd

Skewen (Welsh: Sgiwen) is a village within the county borough of Neath Port Talbot, in Wales. The village is served by Skewen railway station and has its own rugby club.

== History ==
Skewen was once an industrial village. There was a number of collieries around the village. The Crown and Mines Royal Copper Works and the Cheadle and Neath Abbey Ironworks were, once, important industrial sites which stood close by. Old top-loading blast furnaces can also be seen at Neath Abbey. To the south of Skewen lies the village of Llandarcy, the site of the United Kingdom's first oil refinery. The site of this former oil refinery is now being developed as an urban village called Coed Darcy, a development which was promoted, at its start, by the Prince of Wales's Foundation for the Built Environment.

== Monuments of interest ==
The ruins of Neath Abbey, a former Cistercian monastery, are now in the care of Cadw. On Mynydd Drumau to the north of the village is an ancient standing stone known as the Carreg Bica (or 'Maen Bradwen').

== Notable people ==
- The village is the birthplace of Sir Samuel Thomas Evans (1859–1918), British judge and politician who was appointed Solicitor-General in 1908 and became the President of the Probate, Divorce and Admiralty Division in 1910.
- Skewen is also the birthplace of the singer Bonnie Tyler (1951–2026) and Welsh composer David John de Lloyd (1883–1948).
- Comedian Eddie Izzard lived in the village for a short time during childhood.
- The grandparents of the American entrepreneur Howard Hughes are believed to have lived in Skewen in the 1930s.
- The murderer, Elizabeth "Betty" Maude Jones, née Baker (1926–?), was born in Skewen. In October 1944, she and an American paratrooper named Karl Hulten (1922–1944), sometimes branded "the Blackout Bonnie and Clyde", carried out a series of crimes that culminated in the murder of a London taxi driver. Both she and Hulten were sentenced to death, but Jones was reprieved by the Home Secretary, Herbert Morrison.

== Nearest places ==
- Birchgrove
