= Parc-y-Dwrlyn Ground =

Cricket ground in Glamorgan, Wales

Coordinates: 51.52524°N 3.29793°W

Ground information
- Location: Pentyrch, Glamorgan
- Establishment: 1983

Team information
Glamorgan	(1993)
- As of 11 September 2010; Source: Ground profile

Parc-y-Dwrlyn Ground is a cricket ground in Pentyrch, Glamorgan. The first recorded match on the ground was in 1993, when Glamorgan played Northamptonshire in a List-A match in the 1993 AXA Equity and Law League.

In local domestic cricket, the ground is the home venue of Pentyrch Cricket Club who play in the South Wales Cricket League.
