= Llandarcy =

Village in Wales

Coordinates: 51°38′25.00″N 3°50′53.00″W

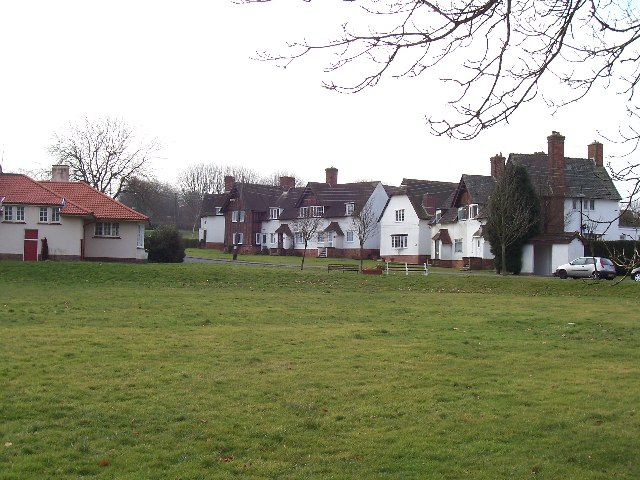
Llandarcy

Llandarcy is a village near Neath in the Neath Port Talbot county borough, Wales, and was adjacent to the site of the first oil refinery in the United Kingdom. It was originally designed as a garden village to house the workers for the BP refinery built between 1918 and 1922. The village is near junction 43 of the M4 motorway.

== History ==
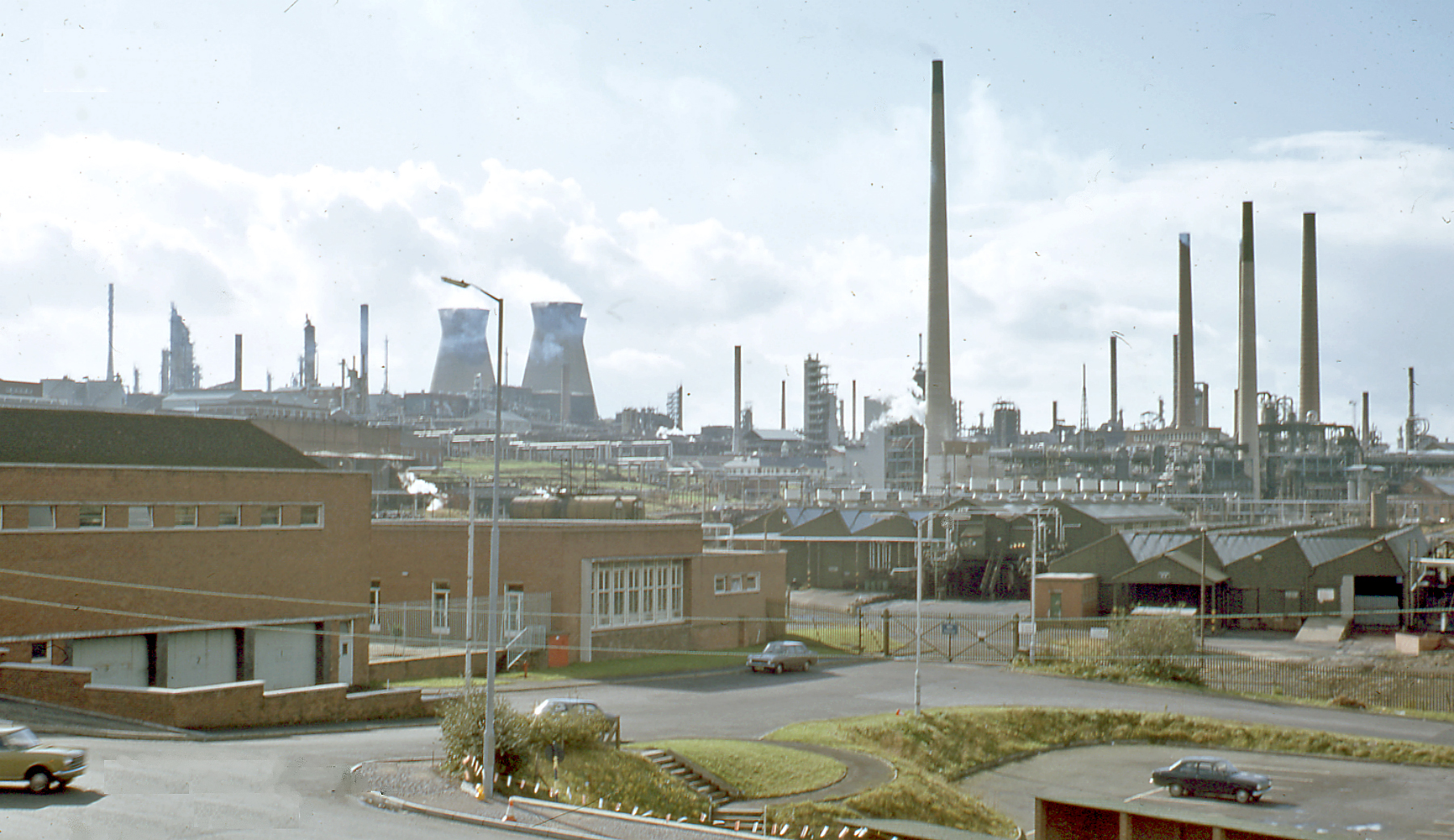
The former Llandarcy Oil Refinery in 1973

Llandarcy was chosen as a site for a refinery because Neath Rural District Council was the only council in the country at that time which could guarantee the requisite daily volume of water required by the refinery. This was supplied from the recently constructed reservoir at Ystradfellte, which was proposed and promoted by Councillor Howells of Skewen. Llandarcy's proximity to Swansea docks, where crude oil could be transported by sea from the Middle East was incidental. Llandarcy was the source of the fuel pipeline PLUTO (Pipe Line Under The Ocean) which supplied fuel to the D-Day landings. The site was damaged by Luftwaffe bombing in 1940. At its peak the refinery was a major employer in South West Wales, with over 2,600 workers. However, it was also responsible for industrial pollution at nearby Crymlyn Bog, an area designated as a Site of Special Scientific Interest. Operations at the refinery were gradually scaled back in the late 20th century, and the site closed in 1998.

The village was named after William Knox D'Arcy, a founding director of the Anglo-Persian Oil Company (the forerunner of BP). Consisting of exactly 100 houses and flats, each property was designed to be different, and they are all of stone construction, with a community centre and local shop. The village is a conservation area as its construction followed the lines of the Cadbury village.

The village was the site of the murders of schoolgirls Geraldine Hughes and Pauline Floyd in 1973. Their killer's identity remained a mystery until 29 years later, in 2002, when DNA evidence was taken by South Wales Police from the grave of Joseph Kappen, confirming him as the killer. Kappen, who lived in Sandfields, Port Talbot and worked as a doorman, lorry and bus driver, died of lung cancer on 17 June 1990, at the age of 49, and took his secret with him to the grave.

== Sport and leisure ==
The BP refinery also operated a sports and leisure club. When the refinery closed in 1998, the leisure facilities were acquired by Llandarcy Park Ltd. They redeveloped the site to a new health and fitness club, a restaurant and hotel. Llandarcy hosts the Virgin Active Health & Racquets Club, formerly the Glamorgan Health & Racquets Club, which has a range of indoor and outdoor sports facilities, and the Llandarcy Academy of Sport, which has one of only two indoor grass training fields in Wales.

== Plans ==
The disused land from the scaling down of the oil refinery has found a number of new uses. Part of the site is now occupied by offices of Natural Resources Wales. The land near the old refinery entrance close to the M4 junction 43 is now a business park. All of the remaining brownfield land occupied by the refinery is being re-developed into a new village called Coed Darcy. The Prince's Trust is an interested party in this development, which seeks to develop the site as an "urban village" in the same vein as the Poundbury village project in Dorset.
