= List of Wales Minor Counties Cricket Club List A players =

Wales Minor Counties Cricket Club was formed in 1988, and first competed in the Minor Counties Championship in their founding season. They have appeared in eighteen List A matches, making nine NatWest Trophy and nine Cheltenham & Gloucester Trophy appearances. The players in this list have all played at least one List A match. Wales Minor Counties cricketers who have not represented the county in List A cricket are excluded from the list.

Players are listed in order of appearance, where players made their debut in the same match, they are ordered by batting order. Players in bold have played first-class cricket.

== Key ==
**General**

- ♠ – Captain
- † – Wicket-keeper
- **First** – Year of debut for Wales Minor Counties
- **Last** – Year of latest match played for Wales Minor Counties
- **Mat** – Number of matches played for Wales Minor Counties
- **Win%** – Winning percentage

**Batting**

- **Inn** – Number of innings batted
- **NO** – Number of innings not out
- **Runs** – Runs scored in career
- **HS** – Highest score
- **100** – Centuries scored
- **50** – Half-centuries scored
- **Avg** – Runs scored per dismissal
- * – Batsman remained not out

**Bowling**

- **Balls** – Balls bowled in career
- **Wkt** – Wickets taken in career
- **BBI** – Best bowling in an innings
- **BBM** – Best bowling in a match
- **Ave** – Average runs per wicket

**Fielding**

- **Ca** – Catches taken
- **St** – Stumpings effected

== List of players ==
No.	Name	First	Last	Mat	Batting			Bowling				Fielding	
No.	Name	First	Last	Mat	Runs	HS	Avg	Balls	Wkt	BBI	Ave	Ca	St
1	Andrew Jones ♠	1993	2005	13	306	93	25.50	0	0	–	–	6	0
2	Andrew Harris †	1993	1994	2	6	5	3.00	0	0	–	–	0	0
3	Barry Metcalf	1993	1993	1	30	30	30.00	0	0	–	–	0	0
4	**John Derrick**	1993	2000	8	123	39	15.37	12	0	–	–	1	0
5	Kristian Bell	1993	2001	1	15	15	15.00	48	0	–	–	1	0
6	Andy Puddle ♠	1993	1994	2	6	5	3.00	0	0	–	–	2	0
7	Gerwyn Edwards	1993	1994	2	33	28*	33.00	72	1	1/36	36.00	1	0
8	**Barry Lloyd**	1993	1993	1	31	31*	–	36	0	–	–	0	0
9	Adrian Griffiths	1993	1994	2	6	6	6.00	102	4	3/57	21.75	1	0
10	Tony Smith	1993	2004	4	8	6	4.00	212	5	2/20	24.80	3	0
11	Aamir Ikram	1993	1993	1	0	0	–	36	0	–	–	0	0
12	Craig Evans	1994	1994	1	12	12	12.00	0	0	–	–	0	0
13	Michael Newbold	1994	2001	8	203	35	25.37	0	0	–	–	0	0
14	Jude Chaminda	1994	1994	1	1	1	1.00	0	0	–	–	0	0
15	**Steffan Jones**	1994	1994	1	26	26*	–	18	0	–	–	0	0
16	**Mark Frost**	1994	1994	1	0	0	0.00	30	0	–	–	0	0
17	Stefan Jenkins ♠	1998	1999	3	73	44	24.33	0	0	–	–	3	0
18	David Lovell	1998	2001	2	13	8	6.50	0	0	–	–	0	0
19	**Roger Clitheroe** ♠†	1998	2001	3	37	23	12.33	0	0	–	–	1	1
20	**Mark Davies**	1998	2001	7	70	30*	23.33	330	6	2/34	34.83	2	0
21	**David Towse**	1998	2004	11	114	30*	19.00	639	18	3/19	17.27	1	0
22	Alexander Barr	1998	2001	4	46	30	11.50	240	7	3/47	27.28	0	0
23	**Steve Barwick**	1998	2001	9	11	5*	5.50	476	13	3/44	18.53	1	0
24	Jonathan Davies	1998	2002	4	4	4*	4.00	228	4	1/30	38.75	1	0
25	Jamie Sylvester ♠	1999	2002	9	165	37	20.62	186	5	2/37	36.40	2	0
26	Ryan Sylvester	1999	2002	12	294	73	29.40	48	0	–	–	2	0
27	Philip George	1999	2001	8	53	23*	17.66	357	5	3/51	53.40	4	0
28	James Langworth †	1999	2000	6	124	67*	24.80	0	0	–	–	3	0
29	**Paul Warren**	1999	1999	1	0	0	–	60	0	–	–	0	0
30	**Mohammad Ali**	1999	1999	1	14	14	14.00	60	3	3/43	14.33	2	0
31	Paul Jenkins	1999	1999	1	1	1*	–	60	2	2/32	16.00	0	0
32	Tim Hemp	1999	1999	1	1	1	1.00	0	0	–	–	0	0
33	**Phil Simmons** ♠	2000	2002	9	266	82	38.00	468	11	3/34	32.09	4	0
34	**Colin Metson** ♠†	2000	2004	9	10	4	3.33	0	0	–	–	11	7
35	Lyndon Jones	2000	2002	5	51	38	12.75	210	7	2/11	23.57	3	0
36	Gareth Davies	2001	2001	2	15	8	7.50	0	0	–	–	2	0
37	Nathan Gage	2001	2002	6	24	12*	24.00	324	5	2/42	54.40	1	0
38	Owen Dawkins	2001	2004	5	29	18	9.66	66	1	81.00	1/21	2	0
39	Alexander French	2001	2002	2	16	15	8.00	78	3	3/35	19.66	0	0
40	Owain Hopkins	2001	2002	2	10	9	5.00	30	2	2/29	14.50	1	0
41	Sion Morris	2002	2004	4	56	46	18.66	0	0	–	–	0	0
42	Richard Skone	2001	2001	1	0	0	–	60	0	–	–	0	0
43	Craig Barnsley	2002	2002	1	0	0	–	18	0	–	–	0	0
44	**Alun Evans**	2003	2005	3	76	60	25.33	30	1	1/23	23.00	2	0
45	**Gareth Rees**	2003	2005	3	38	15	12.66	0	0	–	–	1	0
46	**Keith Newell**	2003	2005	3	18	10	9.00	114	2	2/36	56.00	1	0
47	Matthew Mason	2003	2005	3	2	2	1.00	132	4	2/32	26.50	0	0
48	Ian Capon	2003	2003	1	0	0	–	24	1	1/25	25.00	0	0
49	Nick Swetman	2004	2004	1	4	4	4.00	60	1	1/41	41.00	0	0
50	**Mike O'Shea**	2005	2005	1	0	0	0.00	0	0	–	–	1	0
51	**Will Bragg** †	2005	2005	1	41	41*	–	0	0	–	–	1	0
52	**Kyle Tudge**	2005	2005	1	4	4	4.00	30	0	–	–	1	0
53	Carl Roberts	2005	2005	1	10	10	10.00	26	1	1/22	22.00	1	0
54	**Huw Waters**	2005	2005	1	8	8	8.00	30	0	–	–	0	0
55	Adam Davies	2005	2005	1	17	17	17.00	36	2	2/24	12.00	0	0

== List A captains ==
No.	Name	First	Last	Mat	Won	Lost	Tied	Win%
1	Andy Puddle	1993	1994	2	0	2	0	0%
2	Roger Clitheroe	1998	1998	1	0	1	0	0%
3	Jamie Sylvester	1999	2000	3	2	1	0	66.66%
4	Colin Metson	2000	2004	8	5	3	0	63%
5	Phil Simmons	2001	2001	2	1	1	0	50%
6	Andrew Jones	2005	2005	1	0	1	0	0%
**Total**		1995	2004	**18**	**8**	**10**	**0**	**45.00%**

== See also ==
- Wales Minor Counties Cricket Club
