= List of people from Swansea =

This is a list of notable people born in, or associated with, the city of Swansea, in Britain.

== Academics ==
- Sir Granville Beynon, physicist
- Edward George Bowen, radar pioneer
- Alan Cox (computer programmer), key figure in the development of Linux
- Joan Curran, scientist
- Huw Dixon, economist
- Sir Sam Edwards, physicist
- Brian Flowers, Baron Flowers, physicist
- Sir Clive Granger, Nobel Prize–winning economist
- Sir William Robert Grove, physicist and judge
- Uzo Iwobi, lecturer
- John Gwyn Jeffreys, conchologist, malacologist
- Ernest Jones, psychoanalyst
- John Viriamu Jones, mathematician, physicist
- David Ley, geographer
- Sir John Maddox science writer
- Arun Midha, medical educationist
- Dewi Zephaniah Phillips, philosopher
- Bill Price, physicist
- David Williams, mathematician
- C. E. Wynn-Williams, physicist
- Olgierd Zienkiewicz, mathematician, engineer

== Actors and actresses ==
- Keith Allen
- Kevin Allen
- Gareth Armstrong
- Steve Balsamo
- Desmond Barrit
- Rob Brydon
- Geraint Wyn Davies
- Mabel Hackney
- Georgia Henshaw
- Gary Jones
- Anthony Lyn
- Ruth Madoc
- Steven Meo
- Islwyn Morris
- Siwan Morris
- Richard Mylan
- Joanna Page
- Robert Perkins
- Ceri Phillips
- Victoria Plucknett
- Cara Readle
- Vincent Regan
- Matt Ryan
- Philip Sayer
- Andy Secombe, voice actor
- Harry Secombe
- John Sparkes
- Talfryn Thomas
- Alexander Vlahos
- Melanie Walters
- Tom Ward
- Catherine Zeta-Jones.

== Artists ==
- Alfred Janes
- Mervyn Levy
- Thyrza Anne Leyshon
- Cedric Morris
- Finbarr O'Reilly, photographer
- Ceri Richards
- Glan Williams

== Industrialists ==
- Lewis Llewelyn Dillwyn
- George Lockwood Morris
- Sir John Morris, 1st Baronet
- Christopher Rice Mansel Talbot
- David Thomas
- Henry Vivian, 1st Baron Swansea
- John Henry Vivian

== Journalists and broadcasters ==
- Colin Edwards, radio journalist and filmmaker
- Charles Fisher, journalist and poet
- Liz Fuller, model and TV presenter
- Ian Hislop, comedian, satirist, editor of Private Eye magazine
- Phil Kerslake, TV presenter
- David Mercer, sports presenter
- Rhodri Owen, radio and TV presenter
- Davinia Palmer, radio and TV presenter
- Anna Ryder Richardson
- Wynford Vaughan-Thomas

== Musicians ==
- Badfinger, rock music group
- Richard Barrett, composer
- Rachel K Collier, singer/songwriter
- Lisa Lee Dark, singer
- John Davies (composer)
- Spencer Davis, rock musician
- Mike Gibbins, rock drummer
- Howell Glynne, operatic bass
- Fred Godfrey, songwriter
- Pete Ham, singer/songwriter
- Jones Hewson, baritone
- Shaheen Jafargholi, singer
- Karl Jenkins, composer
- Daniel Jones, composer
- Ceri Rhys Matthews, traditional musician
- John Metcalf, composer
- Rebecca Onslow, singer/songwriter
- Mal Pope, singer/songwriter
- Hannah Stone, harpist
- The Storys, rock band
- Elin Manahan Thomas, soprano
- Trampolene, rock band
- Bonnie Tyler, singer
- Viva Machine, alternative rock group
- Gareth Walters, composer
- John Weathers, rock drummer
- Terry Williams, drummer (Dire Straits)

== Politicians ==
- Donald Anderson, Baron Anderson of Swansea
- Suzy Davies
- Sir John Dillwyn-Llewellyn, 1st Baronet
- Nigel Evans
- Ted Grace
- David Grenfell
- Mike Hedges
- Michael Heseltine
- Michael Howard
- Huw Irranca-Davies
- Siân James
- William Albert Jenkins
- Carwyn Jones
- David Brynmor Jones
- Leifchild Leif-Jones, 1st Baron Rhayader
- Sir Julian Lewis
- Percy Morris
- Colin Phipps
- Gwyn Prosser
- Hugh Rees
- Rees G. Richards

== Religious leaders ==
- Cenydd, saint and hermit
- Graham Charles Chadwick, bishop, anti-apartheid campaigner
- Llewellyn Henry Gwynne, bishop in Sudan
- Griffith John, Christian missionary and translator in China
- Norman Matthews, chancellor of the Llandaff diocese
- Anthony Pierce, bishop of Swansea and Brecon
- Evan Roberts, minister
- Glyn Simon, archbishop of Wales
- Rhys Derrick Chamberlain Walters, dean of the Liverpool Anglican cathedral
- Rowan Williams, archbishop of Canterbury
- Morris Bidwell, 17th century Puritan priest

== Sports people ==
- Jimmy Austin, baseball player
- Nicole Cooke, cyclist
- Tony Cottey, cricketer
- Brian Curvis, boxer
- Dai Dower, boxer
- Tracy Edwards, yachtswoman
- Philip George, cricketer
- Nikara Jenkins, rhythmic gymnast
- Alan Jones, cricketer
- Eifion Jones, cricketer
- Simon Jones, cricketer
- Enzo Maccarinelli, boxer
- Gilbert Parkhouse, cricketer
- Carl Roberts, cricketer
- Don Shepherd, cricketer
- Non Stanford, 2013 World Champion triathlete
- Gary Taylor, 1993 World's Strongest Man
- Rob Terry, wrestler
- Imad Wasim, cricketer, born in Swansea but represents Pakistan
- Carwyn Williams, professional surfer

=== Footballers ===
- Daniel Alfei
- Ivor Allchurch
- John Charles
- Mel Charles
- Chris Coleman
- Ray Daniel
- Richard Duffy
- Trevor Ford
- Bill Harris
- Mark Harris
- John Hartson
- Robbie James
- Cliff Jones
- Dennis Lambourne
- Aaron Lewis
- Andy Melville
- Mel Nurse
- Jackie Roberts
- Joe Rodon
- Dean Saunders
- Gary Sprake

=== Rugby players ===
- William Richard Arnold
- Dan Biggar
- Bleddyn Bowen
- Mervyn Davies
- James Hook
- Alun Wyn Jones
- Ivor Jones
- Lewis Jones
- Ryan Jones
- Douglas Marsden-Jones
- Paul Moriarty
- Richard Moriarty
- George Lockwood Morris
- Dicky Owen
- Idwal Rees
- Billy Trew
- Shane Williams

== Writers ==
- Martin Amis, novelist
- Mary Balogh, novelist
- Russell T Davies, screenwriter
- Amy Dillwyn, novelist and businesswoman
- Joe Dunthorne, poet, novelist
- Mark Ellis, author
- Stuart Evans (1934–1994), novelist and poet
- Paul Ferris
- Iris Gower, novelist
- Bryn Griffiths, poet
- Cyril Gwynn, oral poet
- Ann Hatton, novelist
- Nigel Jenkins, poet
- Stephen Knight, poet
- Gary Ley, novelist
- Bob Lock, novelist
- Ruth Manning-Sanders, children's author and poet
- Jon Mitchell, author and journalist
- T. J. Morgan
- Alex Norris, cartoonist
- John Ormond, poet
- John Pook, poet
- Dylan Thomas, poet/playwright
- Vernon Watkins, poet
- Harri Webb, poet

== Other ==
- Silvanus Bevan, apothecary
- Sybil Connolly, fashion designer
- Catherine Lynch, 19th-century petty criminal
- Edgar Evans, Antarctic explorer
- Francis Grenfell, 1st Baron Grenfell, field marshal and Egyptologist
- Frederick Higginson, RAF fighter ace
- Hugh Llewellyn Glyn Hughes, medical administrator
- Andrew Jones, film maker
- Edward Kenway, pirate, assassin
- Princess Lilian, Duchess of Halland
- John Dillwyn Llewelyn, pioneer photographer, botanist
- Sean Mathias, theatre director, film director
- David Miles, economist
- Beau Nash, socialite, dandy
- Heather Nicholson, animal rights activist
- Red Lady of Paviland, Upper Palaeolithic remains
- Henry Pheloung, New Zealand bandsman, labourer and carrier
- Richard Valentine Pitchford, 'Cardini', magician and entertainer
- Glynn Vivian, art collector
- Alan Woods, political theorist

== See also ==
- List of Welsh people
