= Ammanford =

Town and community in Carmarthenshire, Wales

Ammanford: Welsh: Rhydaman
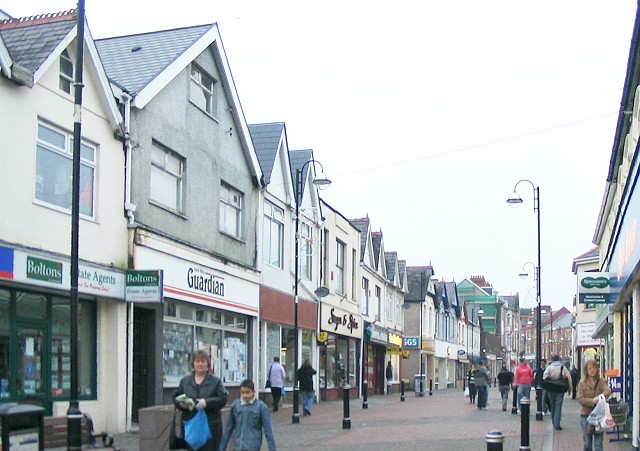

- Location within Carmarthenshire
- Population: 5,445 (Community, 2021); 8,285 (Built up area, 2021)
- OS grid reference: SN625125
- Community: Ammanford
- Principal area: Carmarthenshire
- Preserved county: Dyfed
- Country: Wales
- Sovereign state: United Kingdom
- Post town: AMMANFORD
- Postcode district: SA18
- Dialling code: 01269
- Police: Dyfed-Powys
- Fire: Mid and West Wales
- Ambulance: Welsh
- UK Parliament: Caerfyrddin
- Senedd Cymru – Welsh Parliament: Carmarthen East and Dinefwr
- Website: ammanfordtc.co.uk
- List of places UK Wales Carmarthenshire 51.800°N 3.993°W Map of the community

Ammanford (Welsh: Rhydaman) is a town and community in Carmarthenshire, Wales. At the 2021 census the community had a population of 5,445, and the wider built-up area had a population of 8,285.

Ammanford is served by the A483 and A474 roads. Ammanford railway station is a stop on the Heart of Wales Line, with trains to Llanelli and Swansea to the south and Shrewsbury in England to the north.

Ammanford is twinned with Breuillet, Essonne, France.

== History ==
The town of Ammanford is a relatively modern settlement. It was originally known as Cross Inn, named after an inn that was located where a number of roads converged. During the nineteenth century, as a result of the growth of both the tinplate and anthracite coal trades, a village grew around the Cross Inn (which later became known as Ammanford Square).

As the settlement expanded, prominent residents came to the view that its name should be changed since there were a number of other places named Cross Inn in Carmarthenshire alone. In 1880, a number of public meetings were held, and in November 1880 it was resolved that the name Ammanford (i.e. "Ford of the River Amman") be adopted. The meeting was chaired by Watcyn Wyn. It took several years for the new name to be widely adopted, but the decision of the Great Western Railway to change the name of the Cross Inn station to Ammanford in June 1883 was welcomed by residents and tradespeople.

Ammanford hosted the National Eisteddfod of Wales in 1922 and 1970.

=== Anthracite Strike ===
In 1925 the Ammanford Anthracite Strike took place, where anthracite miners took control of the town by force and violence for 10 days. Two hundred Glamorgan police were ambushed by strikers at Pontamman Bridge during the 'Battle of Ammanford'.

=== School Stabbing Incident ===
On 24 April 2024, Ysgol Dyffryn Aman, the local comprehensive school, was the site of a stabbing incident in which two teachers and a student were injured. A teenage girl was arrested.

== Governance ==
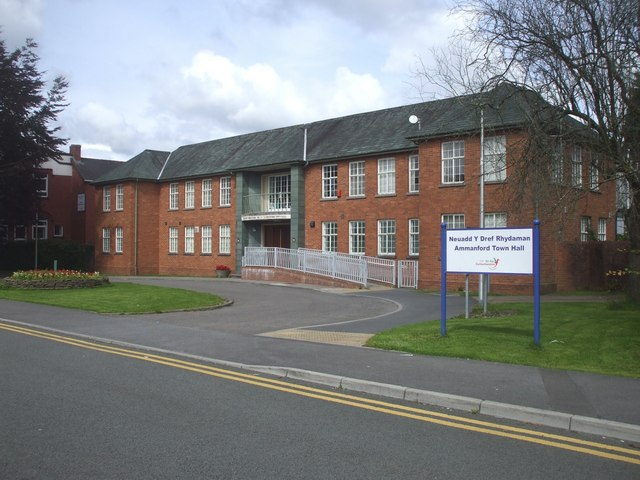
Ammanford Town Hall

There are two tiers of local government covering Ammanford, at community (town) and county level: Ammanford Town Council (Cyngor Tref Rhydaman) and Carmarthenshire County Council (Cyngor Sir Gâr). The town council is based at Ammanford Town Hall on Iscennen Road. The neighbouring communities are Llandybie, Betws, and Llanedi, all being in Carmarthenshire.

=== Administrative history ===
The Ammanford area historically straddled the parishes of Llandybie and Betws in Carmarthenshire. Carmarthenshire had a county council from 1889. When elected parish and district councils were established in 1894, both parishes were given a parish council and included in the Llandilo Fawr Rural District. As a result of the rapid growth of the town, in 1903 Ammanford was made its own urban district and civil parish, taking in areas ceded from both Llandybie and Betws parishes.

The town was then administered by Ammanford Urban District Council from 1903 until 1974. The council built the Town Hall in 1964 to serve as its headquarters.

Ammanford Urban District was abolished in 1974 under the Local Government Act 1972. A community called Ammanford was created instead, covering the area of the abolished urban district, with its community council taking the name Ammanford Town Council. District-level functions passed to Dinefwr Borough Council. Carmarthenshire County Council was abolished as part of the same reforms, with county-level functions passing to the new Dyfed County Council. Dinefwr and Dyfed were both abolished in 1996 and their councils' functions passed to a re-established Carmarthenshire County Council.

=== Parliamentary elections ===
Ammanford was part of the Carmarthenshire county constituency until it was divided in 1885, whereupon the town was located in the East Carmarthen constituency which was held until its abolition in 1918 by the Liberal Party. The Labour Party captured Llanelli in 1922 and have held it ever since. The MP from 1936 until 1970 was Jim Griffiths, a native of nearby Betws. However, in 1997, Ammanford was transferred to the new Carmarthen East and Dinefwr seat which was captured in 2001 by Adam Price of Plaid Cymru. Price remained the MP until 2010 before being replaced by Johnathan Edwards, also of Plaid Cymru. In 2024, Ann Davies of Plaid Cymru was elected as MP for the re-established constituency of Caerfyrddin.

=== Senedd elections ===
Ammanford has been in the Carmarthen East and Dinefwr constituency at Senedd Cymru since devolution in 1999. Rhodri Glyn Thomas was the constituency's first representative at the new assembly before being replaced by Adam Price in 2016. Price would lead Plaid Cymru from 2018 until 2023.

== Religion ==
Ammanford is in the ecclesiastical parish of Ammanford and Betws. Ammanford formed part of the ancient parish of Llandybie, although the parish church at Betws was much closer to the town. The established church was, however, slow to react to the growth of an urban community.

Nonconformist denominations, in contrast, were far more active and Ammanford was an important location as the 1904–1905 Welsh Revival unfolded. Prominent chapels include Ebeneser (Baptist), Gellimanwydd (Independent) and Bethany (Presbyterian Church of Wales). There is an active Christadelphian community based in the town centre, in addition to various Evangelical and Apostolic Churches. The global Apostolic Church grew out of this area and until recently still held the Annual Apostolic Convention at nearby Penygroes.

== Developments ==
On 4 July 2002, Ammanford was granted Fairtrade Town status. This status was renewed by the Fairtrade Foundation on 27 December 2003.

== Notable people ==
- Irwyn Ranald Walters (1902–1992), musician and conductor; founded the National Youth Orchestra of Wales
- Rae Jenkins (1903–1985), violinist and light orchestra conductor
- Donald Peers (1908–1973), singer
- Rheinallt Nantlais Williams (1911–1993), theologian
- Ieuan Rees (born c. 1941), renowned artist & stone mason
- John Rhys-Davies (born 1944), actor (The Lord of the Rings film trilogy)
- Neil Hamilton (born 1949), Member of Parliament
- Christine Jones (born 1955), a Welsh artist and ceramicist
- Rick Smith (born 1959), musician (Underworld) and composer.
- Adam Price (born 1968), politician and former leader of Plaid Cymru
- Alex Jones (born 1977), television presenter on S4C and the BBC's The One Show
- Gareth Jewell (born 1983), actor
- Owain Wyn Evans (born 1984), BBC presenter and drummer.
- Sara Gregory (born 1986), actress
- Alexandra Roach (born 1987), actress

=== Sport ===
- Tom Evans (1882–1955), a Welsh international rugby union flanker with 18 caps for Wales
- David Davies (1902–1992), rugby union and professional rugby league footballer
- Tommy Davies (1920–1998), a Welsh Middleweight boxer and Wales middleweight champion from 1943 until 1949.
- Terry Boyle (born 1958), a Welsh former professional footballer, with over 500 club caps
- Caitlin Lewis (born 1999), a Welsh Rugby Union player who plays wing for the Wales women's national rugby union team
- Lucy Packer (born 2000), rugby union player, member of the England women's national rugby union team

== Sport ==
A motorcycle speedway long-track meeting, one of the few held in the UK, was staged in a village outlying Ammanford, called Tairgwaith. Local football team Ammanford A.F.C. plays in the Cymru South, while rugby union team Ammanford RFC was formed in 1887 and plays in the Welsh Rugby Union leagues. The local cricket team Ammanford Cricket Club is a major part of sports in the town. It won the South Wales Premier Cricket League in 2012 but in 2013 was relegated back to the South Wales Cricket Association 1st Division. The 1st team is captained by ex-Glamorgan cricketer Alun Evans (cricketer)

== Sources ==
- Lock Smith, W.T.H. (1999). Ammanford. Origin of Street Names & Notable Historical Records. Carmarthenshire County Council. ISBN 0906821371.
