= Daren Foster =

English cricketer

Personal information
- Full name: Daren Joseph Foster
- Born: 14 March 1966 (age 60); Tottenham, London, England
- Batting: Right-handed
- Bowling: Right-arm fast-medium
- Role: Bowler

Domestic team information
- Years: Team
- 1986–1989: Somerset
- 1991–1992: Glamorgan
- 1994–1995: Berkshire
- First-class debut: 20 August 1986 Somerset v Sussex
- Last First-class: 17 August 1992 Glamorgan v Durham
- List A debut: 12 July 1987 Somerset v Surrey
- Last List A: 27 June 1995 Berkshire v Surrey

Career statistics
Competition	First-class	List A
Matches	45	44
Runs scored	201	59
Batting average	8.37	8.42
100s/50s	–/–	–/–
Top score	20	21
Balls bowled	6064	1898
Wickets	96	37
Bowling average	40.04	39.00
5 wickets in innings	2	–
10 wickets in match	–	–
Best bowling	6/84	4/26
Catches/stumpings	8/–	5/–
- Source: CricketArchive, 1 October 2010

Daren Joseph Foster (born 14 March 1966) played first-class and List A cricket for Somerset and Glamorgan between 1986 and 1993. He was born in Tottenham, London.

== Somerset career ==
Foster was a tall, slim right-arm fast-medium bowler with a whippy bowling action and a tail-end right-handed batsman. A graduate of the Haringey Cricket College in north London, Foster had one match for Middlesex's second eleven before joining Somerset for the 1986 season. He made his first-class debut towards the end of the season, opening the bowling in a rain-ruined match against Sussex with Joel Garner. Foster was not picked for Somerset's first team for the first half of the 1987 season, but played several times after that, and also made his one-day cricket debut.

In 1988, he was a fairly regular member of the first-class team, and Wisden Cricketers' Almanack noted that he "offered promise for the future". The 13 first-class matches that year would be the most in any single season of Foster's career, and the 28 first-class wickets was also a personal high. His best bowling, though, was a return of four wickets for 46 against Worcestershire, and he did not take five wickets in an innings in his Somerset first-class career. In 1989, Foster played regularly in the one-day team, but had fewer first-class matches and at the end of the season he was not re-engaged by Somerset.

== Finding another county side ==
At the start of the 1990 cricket season, Foster was out of a job. He played a couple of second eleven matches for Surrey early in the season and then one for Derbyshire later on. Derbyshire's opponents in this final match were Glamorgan and although Foster was not notably successful in the game, he was offered a contract by Glamorgan for the 1991 season.

== Glamorgan cricketer ==
As at Somerset, Glamorgan used Foster largely as a back-up to the main opening bowlers, Steve Watkin and Mark Frost, and he played in less than 10 first-class matches in each of the two seasons he spent there. His biggest success as a bowler came in his first County Championship match for Glamorgan, against Somerset, when he took six first innings wickets for 84 runs. There was a second five-wicket innings for Foster the following season, five for 87 in the match against Durham. But this proved to be Foster's final first-class match: at the end of the season, he left Glamorgan "by mutual consent".

== Later career ==
As in 1990 when he had left Somerset, Foster spent time after leaving Glamorgan seeking a further county, and he appeared in a second eleven match for Essex. In 1994, however, he joined Berkshire in the Minor Counties and in the 1995 season played one final List A match when Berkshire played Surrey in the first round of the NatWest Trophy; in this match, batting at No 11, he scored 21, his highest score in all forms of the senior game.
