= Beaten by Them =

Multi-national musical group

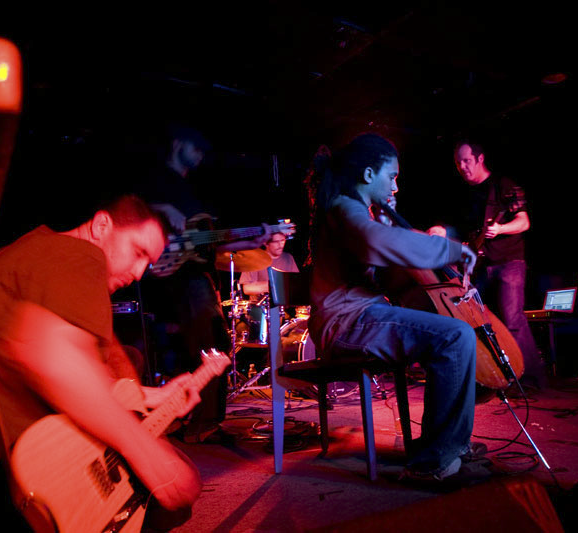
- Beaten by Them performing in Denver, CO (2008)

Background information
- Origin: San Francisco, California, USA
- Genres: Post rock Experimental; Instrumental; Fusion; Postmodern; Minimalist
- Years active: 2005 to present
- Labels: Logicpole
- Members: Andrew Harris; Max McCormick; Boima Tucker; Spencer Murray; Jeff Ardziejewski
- Past members: Lee Matheson; Ulf (Chris) Bjorkbom
- Website: http://BeatenByThem.com/

Beaten by Them is a multi-national San Francisco/Melbourne/New York quintet combining cello, guitars, bass, drums and electronics.

== Musical style ==
Beaten by Them's music is generally categorized as post-rock, but has been noted for being difficult to narrow to one specific genre. The band incorporates elements of rock, jazz, ambient, drone and electronic styles and draws comparisons to classical music through its prominent use of cello and compositional style. The cinematic scope of the music has also been likened to film directors such as Werner Herzog and David Lynch.

== History ==
The band was started by Harris and McCormick in early 2005.

Both Australians, Harris and McCormick moved to Melbourne at the end of 2005, but decided to try to keep the band going regardless of geography. They returned to the US in May 2006 to tour on the West Coast, as well as record their first album, Signs of Life, at Tiny Telephone Studios in San Francisco over 3 days. Post-production was carried out by Harris and McCormick themselves upon return to their Logicpole studio in Melbourne. The album was released in December 2007 via Logicpole. The original lineup came apart after when Bjorkbom and Matheson had issues preventing them traveling to Europe where the band was booked to play.

The band toured the US in August 2008 with this new lineup and then recorded their second album, Invisible Origins in 2009, but it wasn't released until February 2011. In November 2011 the People Start Listening EP was released, which saw the band move deeper into ambient and electronic territory.

Beaten by Them's fourth album Kinder Machines was released in October 2012.

== Members ==
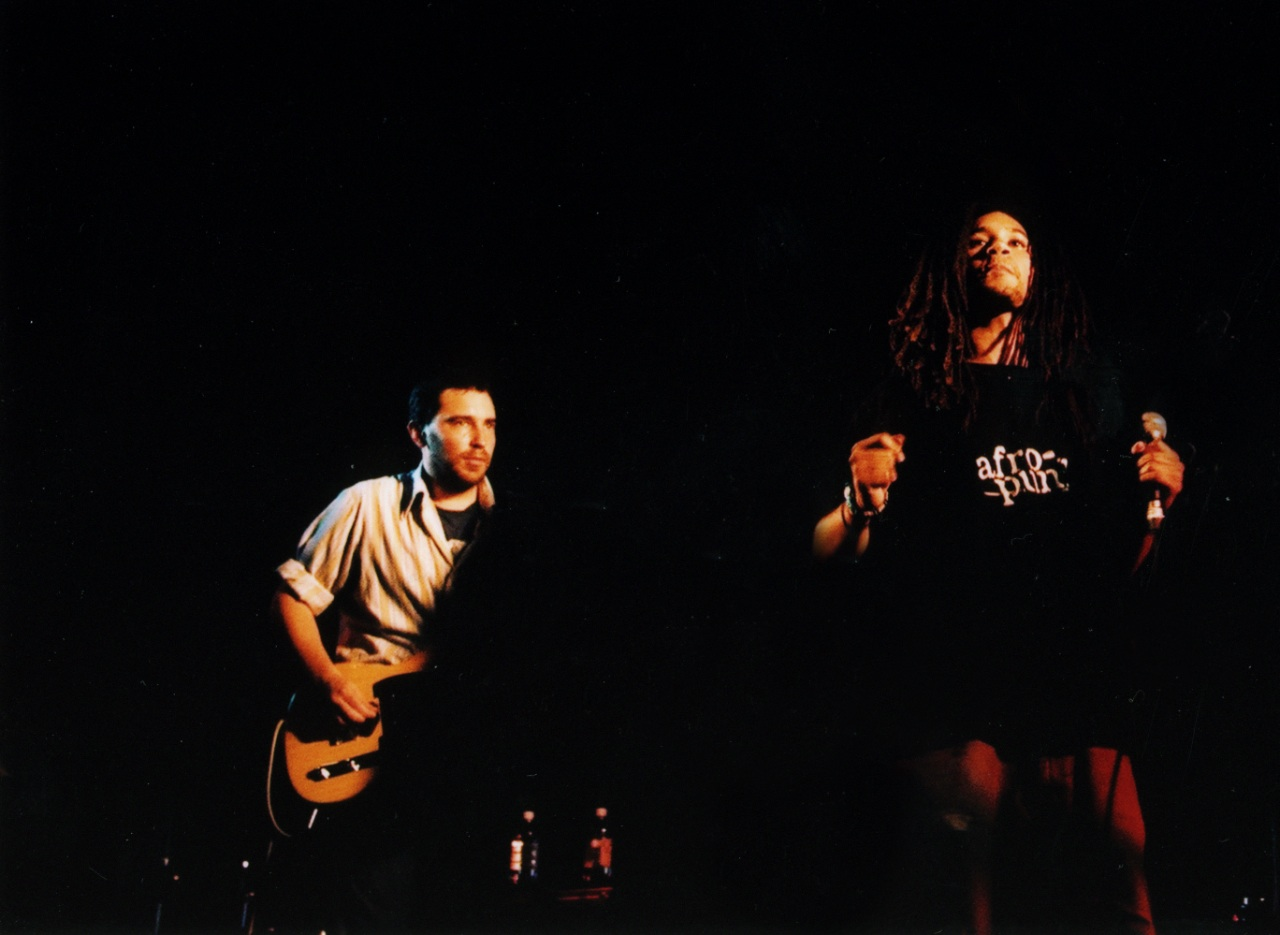
Harris and Tucker performing at Apollo Bay Music Festival, Australia (2007)

=== Present ===
- Andrew Harris - guitar
- Max McCormick - guitar/keys
- Boima Tucker - cello
- Spencer Murray - bass
- Jeff Ardziejewski - drums

=== Past ===
- Lee Matheson - bass
- Ulf (Chris) Bjorkbom - drums

== Discography ==
=== Studio albums ===
- Steam (2005)
- Signs of Life (2007)
- Invisible Origins (2011)
- People Start Listening (2011)
- Kinder Machines (2012)
