= Carl Roberts =

Carl Roberts may refer to:

- Carl Roberts (diplomat), diplomat and ambassador of Antigua and Barbuda
- Carl Roberts (cricketer) (born 1983), Welsh cricketer
- Carl Glennis Roberts (1886–1950), American surgeon, gynecologist, and civil rights leader
- Charles Carl Roberts (1973–2006), perpetrator of the West Nickel Mines School shooting
