= Tudge =

Tudge is a surname. Notable people with the surname include:

- Alan Tudge (born 1971), Australian politician
- Colin Tudge (born 1943), British science writer and broadcaster
- Kyle Tudge (born 1987), Welsh cricketer
