= Philip George =

Philip George may refer to:

- Philip George (cricketer)
- Philip George (DJ)
- Phillip George, director of shows such as Forbidden Broadway Cleans Up Its Act
