= Paul Warren =

Paul Warren may refer to:

- Paul Warren (actor) (born 1974), British actor
- Paul Warren (cricketer) (born 1978), English cricket player
- Paul Warren (guitarist) (born 1953), American guitar player
- Paul Warren (fiddler) (1918–1978), American fiddle player
