= Swetman =

Swetman is a surname. Notable people with the surname include:

- Nick Swetman (born 1984), Welsh cricketer
- Ralph Waldo Swetman (1886–1957), American educator
- Roy Swetman (1933–2023), English cricketer

== See also ==
- Swetman House, a building in Seward, Alaska, US
- Swetman Island, an island in Lake Ontario, south of Picton, Canada
