= Gellimanwydd Chapel =

Chapel in Ammanford, Carmarthenshire, Wales

Coordinates: 51.7925°N 3.9857°W

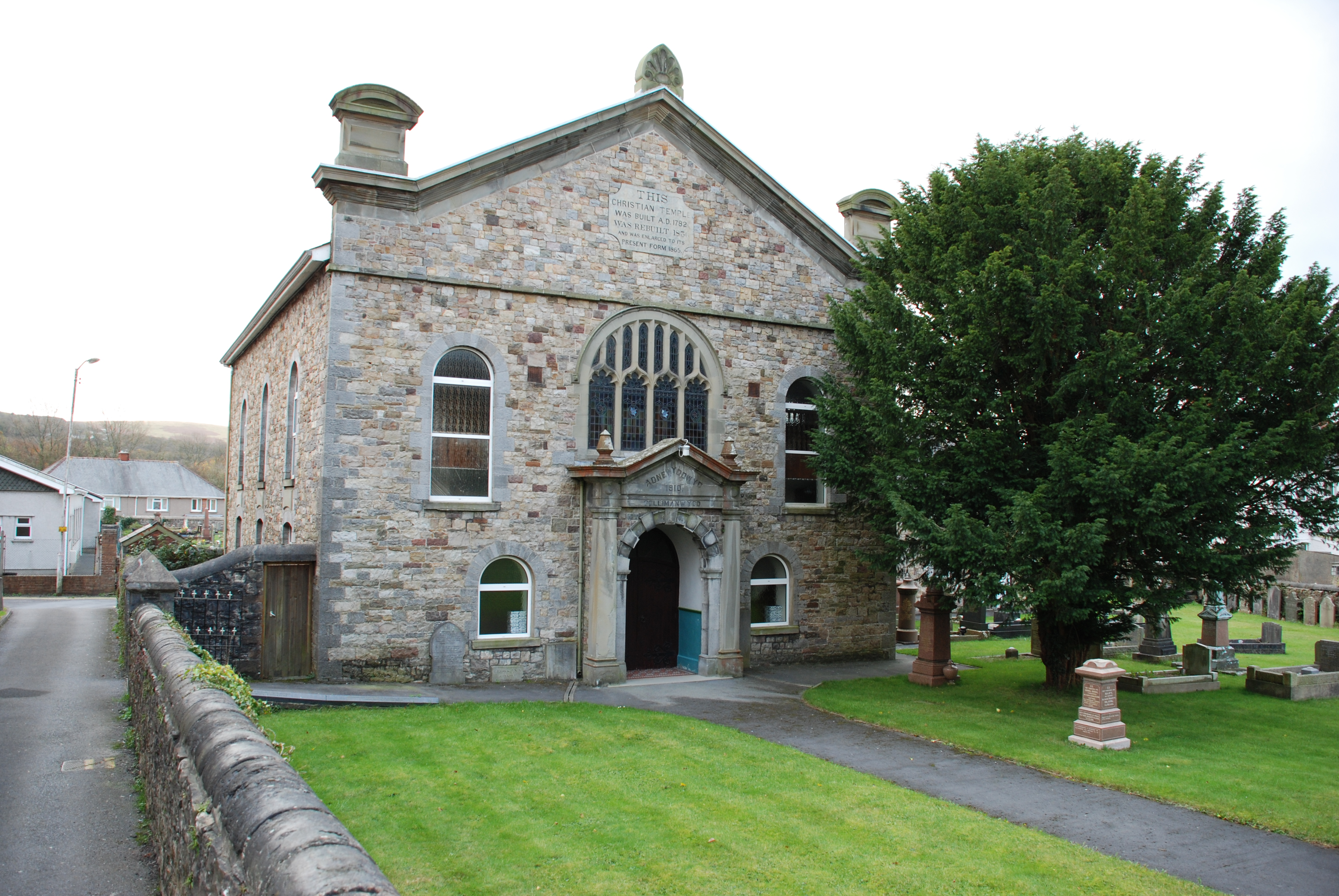
Gellimanwydd Chapel, or Christian Temple

Gellimanwydd Chapel, also known as the Christian Temple, is an Independent (Congregationalist) chapel in Ammanford, Carmarthenshire, Wales. Services at Gellimanwydd are conducted in the Welsh language.

The chapel was founded in the eighteenth century and is the oldest of the town's chapels.

The name "Christian Temple" was adopted in the 1870s by a minister convinced that the Welsh language would die out; it is taken from an inscription on the chapel's facade. The most notable of the chapel's former ministers was David Tegfan Davies (1883-1968), who ministered there for 50 years.

The politician Jim Griffiths and his wife are buried at Gellimanwydd.
