= Owain Hopkins =

Welsh cricketer (born 1980)

Personal information
- Full name: Owain Charles Hopkins
- Born: 18 December 1980 (age 45); Bridgend, Glamorgan, Wales
- Batting: Right-handed
- Bowling: Right-arm off break

Domestic team information
- Years: Team
- 2000–2004: Wales Minor Counties

Career statistics
Competition	LA
Matches	2
Runs scored	10
Batting average	5.00
100s/50s	–/–
Top score	9
Balls bowled	30
Wickets	2
Bowling average	14.50
5 wickets in innings	–
10 wickets in match	–
Best bowling	2/29
Catches/stumpings	1/–
- Source: Cricinfo, 1 January 2011

Owain Charles Hopkins (born 18 December 1980) is a Welsh cricketer. Hopkins is a right-handed batsman who bowls right-arm off break. He was born at Bridgend, Glamorgan.

Hopkins made his Minor Counties Championship debut for Wales Minor Counties in 2000 against Cornwall. From 2000 to 2003, he represented the team in 16 Championship matches, the last of which came against Oxfordshire. His MCCA Knockout Trophy debut for the team came in 2001 against the Warwickshire Cricket Board. From 2001 to 2004, he represented the team in 3 Trophy matches, the last of which came against Oxfordshire. His debut List A appearance for the team came in the 2nd round of the 2002 Cheltenham & Gloucester Trophy against the Sussex Cricket Board, with the match being played in 2001. He made one further List A appearances for the team, which came against Cornwall in the 2nd round of the 2003 Cheltenham & Gloucester Trophy which was held in 2002. In his 2 matches, he scored 10 runs at a batting average of 5.00, with a high score of 9. With the ball he took 2 wickets at a bowling average of 14.50, with best figures of 2/29.

He currently plays club cricket for St Fagans Cricket Club in the South Wales Cricket League.
