= Ammanford Cricket Club =

Cricket club in Carmarthenshire, Wales

- Clwb Criced Rhydaman (Welsh)
- League: South Wales Premier Cricket League

Personnel
- Coach: (Wales) Alun Evans (cricketer)
- Chairman: (Wales) Jeoff Roach

Team information
- Founded: 1886
- Home ground: The Park, Ammanford
- 2012 South Wales Premier Cricket League, Champions, 1st (of 10)

Ammanford Cricket Club is a cricket club from Ammanford in Wales. They are members of the Welsh Cricket Association and currently play in the South Wales Premier Cricket League. The club play at The Park in Ammanford. Their current coach and captain is former Glamorgan player Alun Evans (cricketer).

== History ==
=== Ammanford Cricket Club ===
The club has enjoyed an unprecedented run of sixteen consecutive seasons in the top flight of the South Wales League—recognised as one of the most competitive Leagues in Britain—but it took a long time to get there.

The first reported game of cricket played at Ammanford was when the place was then known as Cross Inn in the parish of Llandybie. The match that took place in July 1853 was played over two innings between Cross Inn and Cwmaman:

"A Cricket Match was played at Cross Inn, on Tuesday last, between the Cross Inn and Cwmamman Clubs. The Cross Inn Club took the bat first, and scored 34 runs. The Cwmamman Club went in and played a tie. The Cross Inn followed and scored 38. The Cwmamman Club went for their last innings, and scored 34 again. After the game had terminated, most of the gentlemen proceeded to Mr Wm Howells, of the Cross Inn, where every accommodation and good refreshment was found."

The inauguration of the club took place in 1886, though the centenary was celebrated in 1975. The belief that the club was formed in 1875 probably stemmed from a July entry in the log book of the local primary school which recorded that pupils were given an afternoon off school in order to watch an Ammanford team play a visiting side.

The club's first secretary was a Councillor David Jones of High Street, which is where another treasurer, Hywel Rees, lived until recently. The first recorded match should be against Cwmaman since the present chairman, Wyn Jones, and secretary, Neil Hobbs, hail from the Cwmaman.

The impetus which established Ammanford as a cricketing locality was the coming of the coal industry which naturally attracted work-seekers from all over Wales and beyond. Several Lancashire folk came to the area, bringing with them a missionary zeal to spread the cricket gospel among the locals. Names from that era have a distinctly un-Welsh cadence: like Ernie Hewlett, Jim Darbyshire and the Cooke brothers.

The home of Ammanford cricket is the Park, then called the Cross Inn Field, where it has played since about 1900. It started play back in 1882 when Cross Inn played their matches in Tirydail on a field adjacent to Afon Llwchwr – where the CCTA now stands. Arthur Morris was responsible for the founding of Ammanford Rugby Football Club in 1887. He was the captain at that time, and one of the principals of the Pontaman Chemical Works. In his team was C. P. Lewis who captained Wales in their second rugby international match against Ireland.

At the time of the move to the Park was made, it had a bowler, Huw Morris, who would bowl underhand with considerable success. On the fixture list was Llandovery, against whom was played for high stakes—dinner hosted by the losers.

Tom Handel Richards became president of the club in 1979 and was feted for his long service to the club when he retired. Amongst the earliest presidents was one Lt. Col. W. N. Jones of Duffryn whose son Harold captained the side in the 1920s. During the Depression of the 1930s, J Owen Parry OBE, was president which may have benefited the club keeping it solvent during this decade of severe privation, and potential use of his two cars available as team transport.

The payment of professionals in an essentially amateur club is a perennially thorny issue, but the engagement of professionals at Ammanford Cricket Club has a long history. Maintaining the square and setting up the wicket was a responsibility of the professional players. For years the square was rolled by a horse-drawn roller: the horse wore foot-pads when working on the square and was the property of the club.

The club's first pavilion was a temporary tent situated where are now the bowling green and tennis courts. It has always been painted green and white – the club's colours. In the early 1950s a pavilion was championed by Roy John. He came from Llangennech to Ammanford and, after being demobbed from the army, devoted much time and energy to the Cricket Club. The 1950s pavilion cost £140-8-8 to construct. In 1972 it was burned to the ground, set alight by the sparks from a nearby garden waste fire. All the club's records (photographs, scorebooks and committee meeting minutes) were lost. John was often seen rolling the square at 5 a.m. to catch the dew, an endearing eccentricity recently adopted by a later groundsman.

Some famous names have been professionals for Ammanford. In 1955, the West Indian test player Frank Worrall nearly came to the club. Local tradespeople were prepared to guarantee his match fees, but he decided instead to go to the Lancashire League. Nissar Ahmed was engaged in his stead. He was followed by David Evans, Alan Rees and Len Hill of Glamorgan, but without doubt the best known Ammanford professional was, before his arrival, an unknown.

=== Linton Lewis ===
Linton Aaron Lewis was in his playing days for Ammanford and Glamorgan Second Eleven in 1983. Later he would become Dr. Linton Lewis, and is now a lawyer and businessman in his native St Vincent. He was a parliamentary candidate for the island's opposition New Democratic Party in the December 2005 general election.

Linton Lewis came to Ammanford as the result of a committee decision under the guidance of secretary Don Phillips to gamble on a young West Indian hopeful. He arrived in 1981, when Ammanford were competing in Division 3. Within three years, Ammanford were champions of Division 1 and had won the Welsh Cup twice. In 1986, the Club achieved the double of becoming Division 1 Champions and Welsh Cup Winners. Ammanford Park became a focal point for hundreds of cricket fans from all over South Wales, and often beyond. This was the first occasion on which a player had scored 1,000 runs in the League. In 1983, Linton amassed 1,543 runs including seven centuries. Ammanford Park has hosted several distinguished batsmen, including Gordon Greenidge and Richie Richardson. Lewis was regarded as one of the club's most successful overseas professionals and was noted for his prolific run-scoring.

Linton left in 1989, much to the relief of the Park's bowling green regulars who had taken to wearing crash helmets during the first XI's home matches. But Ammanford had set a trend which was taken up by other clubs in the South Wales League. Overseas professionals were appearing everywhere. Standards were high, but home-grown talent was being stifled, and the League called a halt. Overseas players were initially banned, but this Draconian measure was later modified to one and which required them to have lived in the locality for 18 months prior to registration.

Linton's legacy was double-edged. On the downside, less magnanimous rivals labelled Ammanford a one-man team, an allegation which our continued presence in the top flight a decade later has shown to be unfounded. One of the many benefits was a second storey to our pavilion.

=== Nissan Ahmed ===
But other cricket leagues throughout Britain employed overseas professionals and the South Wales leagues were no exception. Nissan Ahmed joined Ammanford Cricket Club in 1955 as club professional and is another player of genuine first class ability to have played for the club. He was a product of the cricket leagues in Pakistan which in 1955 was still a new country, having been created from the partition of India on independence in 1947. Nissan was a former member of the Pakistan State Railway Cricket Club who played in Inter-Zone Cricket in Pakistan, and was awarded his Inter-Zone cap. He first played at Ammanford with the Pakistan Eaglets in 1954. He was then a wicket-keeper, reckoned in Pakistan to be near-Test class. He was engaged as the club's professional in the 1955 season as player-coach, and did excellent work in both capacities until illness overtook him about mid-season 1955.

He headed the bowling averages in the First Division of the South Wales and Monmouthshire League for the 1955 season by taking 24 wickets for an average of 7.79, and was highly placed in the batting averages as well. He returned to Pakistan in the winter of 1955.

=== Opposition to the site of the Cricket Pavilion ===
"Mr. Frank Davies said that as he was coming along to the Council meeting that evening he noticed that they had started building the pavilion on a portion of the field which was unsuitable and which would make the field unsightly.

....Mr. Davies went on to say that if the pavilion was allowed to be erected at that spot, it would be most unfair to the residents of Tirydail Lane, and he asked that it be erected on another site where it would not be an obstacle to anyone.
....If they allowed it to be erected on the site now proposed, he assured them that there would be a rumpus in the town, and the residents of Tirydail Lane would protest. He understood that the Cricket Club did not object to a site he had in mind, that was, at the rear of the Welfare Hall.
....He moved that no further work be done there, and that they agree to the alternative site he had mentioned.
....Mr. John Thomas supported Mr. Davies.
....Mr. John Owen Parry said that when the Council were good enough to allow the Cricket Club to put up a pavilion, he had himself a site in mind that was, under the old tree. When he discussed the matter with the groundsman, he suggested this to the groundsman as the best place.
....He (Mr. Parry) quite understood the objection raised, but they had started to erect the pavilion on the site allocated them by the Committee, who had been given plenary powers in the matter.
....The Cricket Club were in no way to blame and he assured them that they were agreeable to the suggestion of Mr. Frank Davies.

....The motion of Mr. Frank Davies was carried."

It would seem from all this that the residents of Tirydail Lane, then a street where Ammanford's better-off residents lived, were influential enough to prevent what they saw as an unsightly cricket pavilion being built in their view. Ever since then the cricket club's three pavilions have all been situated conveniently out of sight behind the local Miners' Welfare Hall.

== South Wales Premier Cricket League ==
In 2010 the Welsh Cricket Board decided to create a new elite league of cricket in South Wales, known as the South Wales Premier Cricket League. Having won the South Wales Cricket League in 2009 Ammanford Cricket Club qualified as Champions to the new league. Although the club shared many ups and downs it finished in 7th place in the league having lost the last 3 games. However the club had a successful Welsh Cup run losing narrowly to Sully in the final played at the SWALEC Stadium in Cardiff.

In 2011 the club have had a disappointed start losing their first 3 games. However, the fortunes of the club have now changed and they have made the Twenty20 Finals day held in the SWALEC Stadium in Cardiff and won this tournament with relative ease. In the League Ammanford finished a disappointing 9th and were fortunate to stay in the division.

In 2012 Ammanford recorded 256 points to win the league for the first time in its short history. They finished 28 points clear of rivals Mumbles CC to clinch the title away v. Swansea CC on 31 August 2012.

In 2013....

== SWALEC Twenty20 Competition ==
2010

In 2010 the Welsh Cricket Board created the Swalec Twenty20 Competition. This included 2 groups of 3 teams and 1 group of 4 (each representative of the Swalec Premier Cricket League). Teams play the others in their group once with the group winner representing their 'Festival' in a Finals Day in the Swalec Stadium in Cardiff. Ammanford CC lost their group in 2010.

2011

In 2011 they had a much more successful run. After winning their region they played against and defeated Mumbles C.C in the Semi Final before defeating Sully C.C in the Final, a great victory for the club.

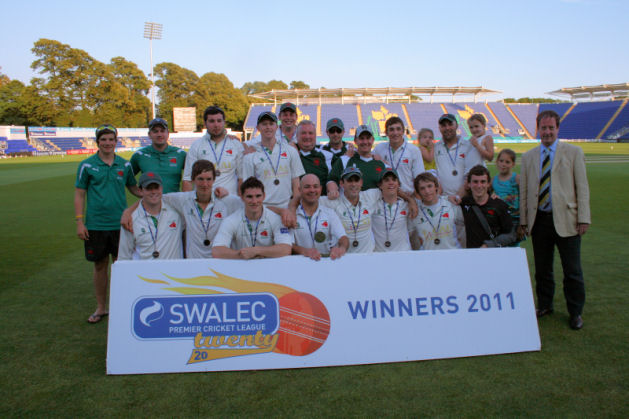
Ammanford C.C SWALEC Twenty20 Champions 2011

They then represented Wales in the South West of England & Wales Championship Finals Day, however they lost their first game to St. Just Cricket Club.

2012

In 2012 Ammanford CC did not need to qualify for the Swalec Twenty20 Finals Day as they qualified as Champions. On a rain affected day they lost to Cardiff C.C in the first semi-final. Sully C.C went on to win this competition.

2013

In 2013 Ammanford hosted the Swalec Twenty20 Festival for the first time in their history. In the first game of the day Ammanford CC chased down 169 set by Ynysygerwn CC. The second game saw Newport CC defeat Ynystawe CC meaning the third game was a winner takes all. Ammanford CC set 226–2 in the first innings with Alun Evans scoring 127 not out. Ynysygerwn CC were bowled out for 62. This means they will play Ponturddulais in the second semi-final on T20 Finals Day on Sun 14 July at the Swalec Stadium, the other semi being Sudbrook CC v Sully CC.

== Balconiers ==
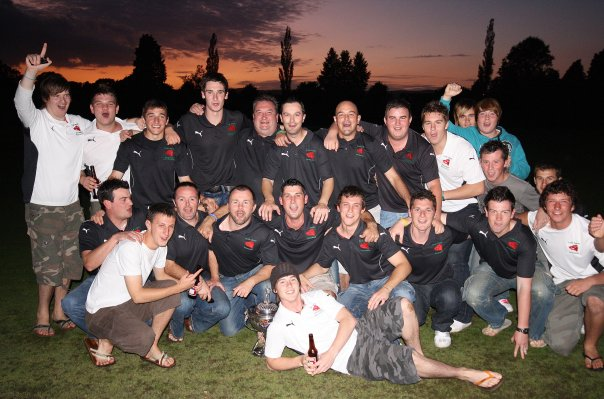
Ammanford CC Balconiers & Players after winning the South Wales Cricket League in 2009

The Ammanford 'Balconiers' are a group of supporters that watch and support Ammanford Cricket Club on a weekly basis home and away. The core are made up of the young footballers in the area who during the off season support the local cricket club. They often wear their own 'Balconiers' tops which are available to buy from the club.

== Honours ==
- South Wales Cricket Association League
  - Division One Champions: 1983, 1986, 2008, 2009, 2014
  - Division Two Champions: 1982, 2001 & 2006
  - Division Three Champions: 1981
  - Division Four Champions: 1953
- South Wales Cricket Association Reserve League
  - Division Two Champions: 2006
- South Wales Cricket Association Cup
  - Champions: 1985, 1989, 1993, 2003, 2013
- South Wales Premier Cricket League
  - Champions: 2012
- South Wales Premier League Twenty20 Championship
  - Champions: 2011, 2018
  - Finals Day: 2012, 2013
- Welsh Cricket Cup
  - Champions: 1981, 1982, 1986, 2018
  - Runners-Up: 2010, 2015
- Welsh Intermediate Cricket Cup
  - Champions: 1996

== Staff and board members ==
- First Team Captain: (Wales) Alun Evans (cricketer)
- Reserve Team Captain: (Wales) Rhys Culley
- Third Team Captain: (Wales) Ian Rees
- Secretary: (Wales) Jeff Roach

== Notable Former/Current Player ==
- Dean Cosker – England A, England U19's, Glamorgan
- Michael Reed (cricketer) – Glamorgan
- Will Owen (cricketer) – Glamorgan
- Andrew Salter (cricketer) – England U19's, Glamorgan
