= Andy Puddle =

Welsh cricketer

Personal information
- Full name: Andrew Charles Puddle
- Born: 10 September 1956 (age 70); Llanrwst, Denbighshire, Wales
- Batting: Left-handed

Domestic team information
- Years: Team
- 1988–1994: Wales Minor Counties

Career statistics
Competition	List A
Matches	2
Runs scored	6
Batting average	3.00
100s/50s	–/–
Top score	5
Balls bowled	–
Wickets	–
Bowling average	–
5 wickets in innings	–
10 wickets in match	–
Best bowling	–
Catches/stumpings	2/–
- Source: Cricinfo, 13 May 2011

Andrew Charles Puddle (born 10 September 1956) is a former Welsh cricketer. Puddle was a left-handed batsman. He was born in Llanrwst, Denbighshire.

Puddle made his debut for Wales Minor Counties in the 1988 MCCA Knockout Trophy against Shropshire. He played Minor counties cricket for Wales Minor Counties from 1989 to 1994, which included 61 Minor Counties Championship matches and 7 MCCA Knockout Trophy matches. In 1993, he made his List A debut against Sussex, in the NatWest Trophy. He played a further List A match for the team, against Middlesex in the 1994 NatWest Trophy. In his 2 List A matches, he scored 6 runs at a batting average of 3.00, with a high score of 5.
