= Kristian Bell =

Welsh cricketer

Personal information
- Full name: Kristian Martin Bell
- Born: 15 April 1972 (age 54); Cardiff, Glamorgan, Wales
- Batting: Right-handed
- Bowling: Leg break

Domestic team information
- Years: Team
- 1992–2001: Wales Minor Counties

Career statistics
Competition	List A
Matches	8
Runs scored	123
Batting average	15.37
100s/50s	–/–
Top score	39
Balls bowled	12
Wickets	–
Bowling average	–
5 wickets in innings	–
10 wickets in match	–
Best bowling	–
Catches/stumpings	1/–
- Source: Cricinfo, 13 May 2011

Kristian Martin Bell (born 15 April 1972) is a former Welsh cricketer. Bell was a right-handed batsman who bowled leg break. He was born in Cardiff, Glamorgan.

Bell made his debut for Wales Minor Counties in the 1992 Minor Counties Championship against Berkshire. He played Minor counties cricket for Wales Minor Counties from 1992 to 2001, which included 58 Minor Counties Championship matches and 13 MCCA Knockout Trophy matches. He made his List A debut for Wales Minor Counties against Sussex in the 1993 NatWest Trophy. He made 7 further List A appearances for the county, the last coming against Leicestershire in the 2001 Cheltenham & Gloucester Trophy. In his 8 List A matches, he scored 123 runs at a batting average of 15.37, with a high score of 39.
