= Sion Morris =

Welsh cricketer

Personal information
- Full name: Sion Elgan Morris
- Born: 6 July 1977 (age 49); St Asaph, Denbighshire, Wales
- Batting: Left-handed

Domestic team information
- Years: Team
- 1998–2004: Wales Minor Counties

Career statistics
Competition	LA
Matches	4
Runs scored	56
Batting average	18.66
100s/50s	–/–
Top score	46
Balls bowled	–
Wickets	–
Bowling average	–
5 wickets in innings	–
10 wickets in match	–
Best bowling	–
Catches/stumpings	–/–
- Source: Cricinfo, 1 January 2011

Sion Elgan Morris (born 6 September 1977) is a Welsh cricketer. Morris is a left-handed batsman. He was born in St Asaph, Denbighshire.

Morris made his Minor Counties Championship debut for Wales Minor Counties in 1998 against Cornwall. From 1998 to 2003, he represented the team in 12 Championship matches, the last of which came against Oxfordshire. His MCCA Knockout Trophy debut for the team came in 2001 against the Worcestershire Cricket Board. From 2001 to 2004, he represented the team in four Trophy matches, the last of which again came against Oxfordshire. His debut List A appearance for the team came in the third round of the 2002 Cheltenham & Gloucester Trophy against Durham. From 2002 to 2004, he represented the team in four List A matches, the last of which came against Middlesex. In his four matches, he scored 56 runs at a batting average of 18.66, with a high score of 46.

He currently plays club cricket for Colwyn Bay Cricket Club in the Liverpool and District Cricket Competition.
