= Andrew Harris =

Andrew or Andy Harris may refer to:

== Sports ==
- Andy Harris (baseball) (1896–1957), American Negro league baseball player
- Andy Harris (footballer, born 1970), English footballer
- Andrew Harris (cricketer, born 1971), Welsh former cricketer
- Andrew Harris (cricketer, born 1973), English cricketer
- Andy Harris (footballer, born 1977), South African-born footballer in England
- Andrew Harris (Canadian football) (born 1987), Canadian football player
- Andrew Harris (tennis) (born 1994), Australian tennis player

== Others ==
- Andrew Harris (abolitionist) (1814–1841), American minister and anti-slavery activist
- Andrew L. Harris (1835–1915), American Civil War general and 44th governor of Ohio
- Andy Harris (politician) (born 1957), American physician and politician from Maryland
- Andy Harris (mountain guide) (1964–1996), mountain guide from New Zealand

== See also ==
- Andy Harries (born 1954), British television and film producer
