= Ammanford Town Hall =

Building in Carmarthenshire, Wales

- Neuadd y Dref Rhydaman (Welsh)
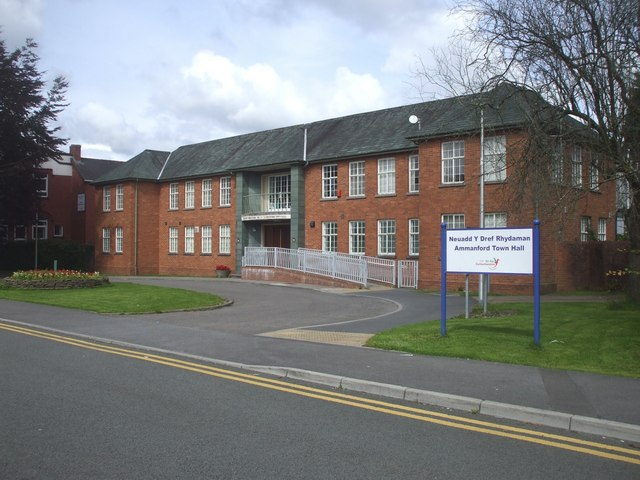
- The building in August 2009

- Shown in Carmarthenshire
- 51.7944°N 3.9915°W
- Location: Iscennen Street, Ammanford

History
- Built: 1964

Site notes
- Architect: W. H. Lock-Smith
- Architectural style: Neo-Georgian style

Ammanford Town Hall (Welsh: Neuadd y Dref Rhydaman) is a municipal building located on Iscennen Street in Ammanford in Carmarthenshire in Wales. The structure is currently used as the offices and meeting place of Ammanford Town Council.

== History ==
Following significant population growth, largely associated with the anthracite coal mining industry, Ammanford Urban District Council was established in 1903. The council initially operated from three terraced houses, Nos 48, 50 and 52 College Street. These were four-storey properties, designed in the Victorian style, built with a cement render finish, and featuring prominent flat-headed gables. By the 1950s, the terraced houses were inadequate in the context of the increasing responsibilities of local councils, and civic leaders decided to commission a purpose-built town hall. The site they selected was open land to the southwest of College Street.

The new building was designed by the borough architect, W. H. Lock-Smith, in the Neo-Georgian style, built in red brick and was completed in 1964. The design involved a symmetrical main frontage of 13 bays facing onto Iscennen Street, with the end two bays at each end projected forward as pavilions. The central bay featured a recessed doorway with a French door and balcony above, the surround being in green stone. The other bays were all fenestrated with sash windows. Internally, it accommodated the council chamber, offices, and the town library.

Portraits of two miners, John Williams and Sammy Morris, who fought for the International Brigades in the Spanish Civil War and who died at Brunete in July 1937, were placed on the wall in the council chamber after the end of that war.

The building continued to serve as the offices of the urban district council for much of the 20th century, but ceased to be the local seat of government when the enlarged Dinefwr Borough Council was established in 1974. Dinefwr Council continued to use the town hall for the delivery of local services, and Ammanford Town Council established its offices and meeting place in the building.

In September 2017, Carmarthenshire County Council proposed closing the building, but following a campaign to keep it open, the county council announced, in October 2017, that it would be closing its offices at Parc Amanwy in the town instead.
