= Gareth Davies (cricketer) =

Welsh cricketer

Personal information
- Full name: Gareth Rhys Davies
- Born: 16 February 1975 (age 51); Gorseinon, Glamorgan, Wales
- Batting: Left-handed
- Bowling: Slow left-arm orthodox

Domestic team information
- Years: Team
- 1996–2001: Wales Minor Counties

Career statistics
Competition	LA
Matches	2
Runs scored	15
Batting average	7.50
100s/50s	–/–
Top score	8
Balls bowled	–
Wickets	–
Bowling average	–
5 wickets in innings	–
10 wickets in match	–
Best bowling	–
Catches/stumpings	2/–
- Source: Cricinfo, 1 January 2011

Gareth Rhys Davies (born 16 February 1975) is a former Welsh cricketer. Davies was a left-handed batsman who bowled slow left-arm orthodox. He was born at Gorseinon, Glamorgan.

Davies made his Minor Counties Championship debut for Wales Minor Counties in 1996 against Oxfordshire. From 1996 to 2000, he represented the team in 12 Championship matches, the last of which came against Oxfordshire. His MCCA Knockout Trophy debut for the team came in 1998 against Wiltshire. From 1998 to 2001 he represented the team in 4 Trophy matches, the last of which came against Herefordshire. His debut List A appearance for the team came in the 1st round of the 2001 Cheltenham & Gloucester Trophy against the Somerset Cricket Board. He represented the team in a further List A match against Norfolk in the 2nd round of the same competition. In his 2 matches, he scored 15 runs at a batting average of 7.50, with a high score of 8.

He previously played a single Second XI Championship match for the Glamorgan Second XI in 1998.
