= David Lovell =

Australian-born Welsh cricketer

Personal information
- Full name: David John Lovell
- Born: 16 February 1969 (age 57); Adelaide, South Australia, Australia
- Batting: Right-handed
- Bowling: Slow left-arm orthodox

Domestic team information
- Years: Team
- 1992–2002: Wales Minor Counties

Career statistics
Competition	List A
Matches	2
Runs scored	13
Batting average	6.50
100s/50s	–/–
Top score	8
Balls bowled	–
Wickets	–
Bowling average	–
5 wickets in innings	–
10 wickets in match	–
Best bowling	–
Catches/stumpings	–/–
- Source: Cricinfo, 13 May 2011

David John Lovell (born 16 February 1969) is an Australian born former Welsh cricketer. Lovell was a right-handed batsman who bowled slow left-arm orthodox. He was born in Adelaide, South Australia.

Lovell made his debut for Wales Minor Counties in the 1998 MCCA Knockout Trophy against the Warwickshire Cricket Board. He played Minor counties cricket for Wales Minor Counties from 1998 to 2004, which included 12 Minor Counties Championship matches and 3 MCCA Knockout Trophy matches. In 1998, he made his List A debut against Nottinghamshire, in the NatWest Trophy. He played a further List A match for the team, against the Sussex Cricket Board in the 2nd round of the 2002 Cheltenham & Gloucester Trophy which was held in 2001. In his 2 List A matches, he scored 13 runs at a batting average of 6.50, with a high score of 8.

Having played for Western Australia Under-19s when he lived in Australia, he later played Second XI cricket for the Derbyshire Second XI, Durham Second XI, Warwickshire Second XI and the Glamorgan Second XI.
