= David Tegfan Davies =

Welsh Congregational minister

David Tegfan Davies OBE FRAS (27 February 1883 – 10 August 1968) was a Welsh Congregational minister. He was raised by his grandparents, Dafydd and Hannah Dafis of Abergwili, Carmarthenshire. On completing his education at the local school, he entered employment as a farm labourer at a farm in Rhyd-y-Rhaw, Peniel. Whilst there he began to attend services at Peniel Congregational Church, and it was there, in 1903, that he began to preach. Following a period studying at the Old College School in Carmarthen, he moved, in 1905, to attend classes at Bala-Bangor College. He was ordained minister in September 1908 at Seion, Pontypridd, and from there moved to Addoldy, Glynneath, where he was inducted in January 1911.

In 1915, during WW1, he relocated again to become minister of Gellimanwydd (Christian Temple), Ammanford, where he would remain for the next 50 years. During the severe Post WWI economic depression and the Great Slump that began in 1929, poverty and unemployment in Ammenford was so extreme that childhood malnutrition and lack of clothing except for remnant coal sacks became commonplace; Davies became chairman of the local 'Distress Committee' and was able to "twin" the town with a parish in Merseyside, Liverpool, that provided sufficient funds to prevent actual starvation. An unusually high proportion of young people from Ammanford went on to academic research careers, a fact that several of them later credited to Davies' influence.

He was much travelled, venturing around much of Europe on cargo ships from Swansea, and to the United States on a preaching tour. He was in the United States in July 1924.

His writings include, Cyn Dringo'r Mynydd Du, O Ganol Shir Gâr, and Rhamantwr y De and Cyffro'r Hen Goffrau, which telling of old Carmarthenshire beliefs and rural amusements, reveal his vivid imagination.

In 1965 he was made an Officer of the Order of the British Empire in acknowledgement of his humanitarian acts and for his bravery on many occasions in rescuing persons in danger of drowning. He was credited with twelve life-saving rescues. Davies was also a Fellow of the Royal Astronomical Society.

He died in 1968, and was buried in Gellimanwydd cemetery.
