= Jamie Sylvester =

Welsh cricketer (born 1971)

Personal information
- Full name: Jamie Peter John Sylvester
- Born: 31 July 1971 (age 55); Cardiff, Glamorgan, Wales
- Batting: Right-handed
- Bowling: Right-arm off break

Domestic team information
- Years: Team
- 1999–2002: Wales Minor Counties
- 1998 & 2000: Herefordshire
- 1997: Berkshire
- 1996–1997: Minor Counties
- 1992–1996: Wales Minor Counties

Career statistics
Competition	LA
Matches	18
Runs scored	309
Batting average	18.17
100s/50s	–/1
Top score	53
Balls bowled	264
Wickets	7
Bowling average	35.85
5 wickets in innings	–
10 wickets in match	–
Best bowling	2/37
Catches/stumpings	3/–
- Source: Cricinfo, 26 September 2010

Jamie Peter John Sylvester (born 31 July 1971) is a former Welsh cricketer. Sylvester was a right-handed batsman who bowled right-arm off break. He was born at Cardiff, Glamorgan.

== Career ==
Sylvester made his Minor Counties Championship debut for Wales Minor Counties in 1992 against Shropshire. From 1992 to 1996, he represented the county in 33 Minor Counties Championship matches, the last of which came in the 1996 Championship when against Herefordshire. Sylvester also played in the MCCA Knockout Trophy for Wales Minor Counties. His debut in that competition came in 1995 when Wales Minor Counties played Cumberland. From 1995 to 1996, he represented the county in 4 Trophy matches, the last of which came when Wales Minor Counties played Bedfordshire in the 1996 MCCA Knockout Trophy.

Between 1996 and 1997, Sylvester represented a combined Minor Counties team in the List-A matches. His List-A debut came against Durham, between 1996 and 1997 he represented the Minor Counties in 6 List-A matches in the Benson & Hedges Cup, the last of which came against Yorkshire.

In the meantime he had joined Berkshire for the 1997 season, making his Minor Counties Championship debut for the county against Oxfordshire. During the 1997 season he represented Berkshire in 9 Championship matches, the last of which came against Wales Minor Counties. Sylvester also played in the MCCA Knockout Trophy, playing a single match against Shropshire. During the 1997 season he also played a single List-A match for Berkshire against Lancashire in the 1997 NatWest Trophy. Sylvester left Berkshire at the end of the 1997 season.

For the 1998 season he joined Herefordshire. Sylvester made his debut for the county in the Minor Counties Championship against Berkshire. During the 1998 season he played 7 Championship matches for the county, the last of which came against Wales Minor Counties. He also represented Herefordshire in 2 matches in the 1998 MCCA Knockout Trophy against the Warwickshire Cricket Board and Wales Minor Counties. He also played List-A cricket for the county, firstly against Middlesex in the 1998 NatWest Trophy, then 2 years later in a one-off appearance for Herefordshire in a 2000 NatWest Trophy match against the Sussex Cricket Board.

In 1999, Sylvester rejoined Wales Minor Counties, from 1999 to 2002 he represented the club in 18 further Minor Counties Championship matches, the last of which came against Cornwall. In his second spell at the club, he also played a further 6 MCCA Knockout Trophy matches, the last of which came against the Warwickshire Cricket Board. Furthermore, Sylvester represented the club in List-A matches, starting with their 1999 NatWest Trophy match against Lincolnshire. From 1999 to 2002, he represented the county in 9 further List-A matches, the last of which came against Cornwall in the 2nd round of the 2003 Cheltenham & Gloucester Trophy which was played in 2002.

In Sylvester's combined List-A career, he scored 309 runs at a batting average of 18.17, with a single half century score of 53. With the ball he took 7 wickets at a bowling average of 35.85, with best figures of 2/37.
