= Irwyn Ranald Walters =

Welsh musician (1902–1992)

Irwyn Ranald Walters (6 December 1902 – 21 November 1992) was a Welsh musician, conductor and administrator.

Walters was born in Ammanford. In his youth, Walters' musical tutorship came from conductor Gwilym R. Jones, and David Vaughan Thomas (1873-1934). Irwyn's education took place at Amman Valley County School and Aberystwyth. After working as a teacher in Bideford, Walters moved to Islington in 1928, and he conducted the Swansea Festival Orchestra, and Welsh Philharmonic Orchestra. He remained an active musician throughout his life, even during World War II, when he organised various concerts across Wales.

Irwyn Walters founded the National Youth Orchestra of Wales in 1945, primarily in response to the high demand for orchestral education being provided in England, and served as its director for a time.

Irwyn died in Swansea, aged 89. His son was Gareth Walters, who also achieved recognition as a musician.
