= Craig Barnsley =

South African-born Welsh cricketer

Personal information
- Full name: Craig Jonathan Barnsley
- Born: 28 February 1983 (age 43); Durban, Natal Province, South Africa
- Batting: Right-handed
- Bowling: Right-arm medium

Domestic team information
- Years: Team
- 2000–2003: Wales Minor Counties

Career statistics
Competition	LA
Matches	1
Runs scored	–
Batting average	–
100s/50s	–
Top score	–
Balls bowled	18
Wickets	0
Bowling average	–
5 wickets in innings	–
10 wickets in match	–
Best bowling	–
Catches/stumpings	0/–
- Source: Cricinfo, 1 January 2011

Craig Jonathan Barnsley (born 28 February 1983) is a South African born Welsh cricketer. Barnsley is a right-handed batsman who bowls right-arm medium pace. He was born in Durban, Natal Province.

Barnsley made his Minor Counties Championship debut for Wales Minor Counties in 2003 against Herefordshire. From 2000 to 2003, he represented the team in 9 Championship matches, the last of which came against Wiltshire. His MCCA Knockout Trophy debut for the team came in 2001 against the Worcestershire Cricket Board. From 2001 to 2002, he represented the team in 4 Trophy matches, the last of which came against the Gloucestershire Cricket Board. His only List A appearance for the team came in the 3rd round of the 2002 Cheltenham & Gloucester Trophy against Durham.

He previously played a single Second XI Championship matches for the Glamorgan Second XI in 2001.
