= Michael Newbold =

Welsh cricketer

Personal information
- Full name: Michael John Newbold
- Born: 6 January 1970 (age 56); Cardiff, Glamorgan, Wales
- Batting: Right-handed
- Bowling: Left-arm medium-fast

Domestic team information
- Years: Team
- 1993–2001: Wales Minor Counties

Career statistics
Competition	List A
Matches	8
Runs scored	203
Batting average	25.37
100s/50s	–/–
Top score	35
Balls bowled	–
Wickets	–
Bowling average	–
5 wickets in innings	–
10 wickets in match	–
Best bowling	–
Catches/stumpings	–/–
- Source: Cricinfo, 13 May 2011

Michael John Newbold (born 6 January 1970) is a former Welsh cricketer. Newbold was a right-handed batsman who bowled left-arm medium-fast. He was born in Cardiff, Glamorgan.

Newbold made his debut for Wales Minor Counties in the 1993 MCCA Knockout Trophy against Shropshire. He played Minor counties cricket for Wales Minor Counties from 1993 to 2001, which included 36 Minor Counties Championship matches and 15 MCCA Knockout Trophy matches. He made his List A debut for Wales Minor Counties against Middlesex in the 1994 NatWest Trophy. He made 7 further List A appearances for the county, the last coming against Leicestershire in the 2001 Cheltenham & Gloucester Trophy. In his 8 List A matches, he scored 203 runs at a batting average of 25.37, with a high score of 35.

He also played Second XI cricket for the Glamorgan Second XI.
