= Nathan Gage =

Australian-born Welsh cricketer

Personal information
- Full name: Nathan Ashley Gage
- Born: 9 February 1974 (age 52); Perth, Western Australia
- Batting: Left-handed
- Bowling: Right-arm medium

Domestic team information
- Years: Team
- 2001–2002: Wales Minor Counties

Career statistics
Competition	List A
Matches	6
Runs scored	24
Batting average	24.00
100s/50s	0/0
Top score	12*
Balls bowled	342
Wickets	5
Bowling average	54.40
5 wickets in innings	0
10 wickets in match	0
Best bowling	2/42
Catches/stumpings	1/–
- Source: Cricinfo, 1 January 2011

Nathan Ashley Gage (born 9 February 1974) is an Australian born former Welsh cricketer. Gage was a left-handed batsman who bowled right-arm medium pace. He was born in Perth, Western Australia.

Gage made his Minor Counties Championship debut for Wales Minor Counties in 2001 against Berkshire. From 2001 to 2002, he represented the team in 7 Championship matches, the last of which came against Cornwall. His MCCA Knockout Trophy debut for the team came in 2001 against Shropshire. He played one further Trophy match for the team in 2001, against the Warwickshire Cricket Board. His debut List A appearance for the team came in the 1st round of the 2001 Cheltenham & Gloucester Trophy against the Somerset Cricket Board. From 2001 to 2002, he represented the team in 6 List A matches, the last of which came against Cornwall in the 2nd round of the 2003 Cheltenham & Gloucester Trophy which was held in 2002. In his 6 matches, he scored 24 runs at a batting average of 24.00, with a high score of 12*. With the ball he took 5 wickets at a bowling average of 54.40, with best figures of 2/42.

He previously played a single Second XI Championship match for the Glamorgan Second XI.

Gage now plays his cricket at Harvington Cricket Club in Worcestershire, where he has led the club averages with both bat and ball for the past 2 seasons and was voted 2010 Worcestershire Player of the Year by the Worcester News.
