= Adam Davies (cricketer) =

Welsh cricketer

Personal information
- Full name: Adam James Davies
- Born: 26 October 1980 (age 46); Cardiff, Glamorgan, Wales
- Batting: Right-handed
- Bowling: Right-arm medium-fast
- Relatives: Hugh Davies (father)

Domestic team information
- Years: Team
- 1999 & 2005: Wales Minor Counties

Career statistics
Competition	LA
Matches	1
Runs scored	17
Batting average	17.00
100s/50s	–/–
Top score	17
Balls bowled	36
Wickets	2
Bowling average	12.00
5 wickets in innings	–
10 wickets in match	–
Best bowling	2/24
Catches/stumpings	–/–
- Source: Cricinfo, 1 January 2011

Adam James Davies (born 26 October 1980) is a Welsh cricketer. Davies is a right-handed batsman who bowls right-arm medium-fast. He was born in Cardiff, Glamorgan.

Davies played a single Minor Counties Championship match for Wales Minor Counties in 1999 against Cornwall.

From 1999 to 2003, Davies played a number of Second XI matches for the Glamorgan Second XI, before playing his only List A match, which came for Wales Minor Counties against Nottinghamshire in the 2005 Cheltenham & Gloucester Trophy. In the match he scored 17 runs and took 2 wickets for the cost of 24 runs from 6 overs.

His father, Hugh, played first-class cricket for Glamorgan from 1955 to 1960.
