= Ian Capon =

Welsh cricketer

Personal information
- Full name: Ian James Capon
- Born: 23 January 1977 (age 49); Haverfordwest, Pembrokeshire, Wales
- Batting: Right-handed
- Bowling: Right-arm fast-medium

Domestic team information
- Years: Team
- 2003–2004: Wales Minor Counties

Career statistics
Competition	LA
Matches	1
Runs scored	–
Batting average	–
100s/50s	–/–
Top score	–
Balls bowled	24
Wickets	1
Bowling average	25.00
5 wickets in innings	–
10 wickets in match	–
Best bowling	1/25
Catches/stumpings	–/–
- Source: Cricinfo, 1 January 2011

Ian James Capon (born 23 January 1977) is a Welsh cricketer. Capon is a right-handed batsman who bowls right-arm fast-medium. He was born at Haverfordwest, Pembrokeshire.

Capon made his Minor Counties Championship debut for Wales Minor Counties in 2003 against Cornwall. He played 2 further Championship matches in 2003, against Shropshire and Oxfordshire. His played a single MCCA Knockout Trophy match for the team in 2005 against Berkshire. His only List A appearance for the team came in the 1st round of the 2004 Cheltenham & Gloucester Trophy against Denmark. The match was held in 2003. In the match he took a single wicket for the cost of 25 runs from 4 overs.

He previously played 2 Second XI Championship matches for the Glamorgan Second XI in 1995.
