= Paul Jenkins (cricketer) =

English cricketer (born 1972)

Personal information
- Full name: Paul Edward Jenkins
- Born: 8 February 1972 (age 54); Gloucester, Gloucestershire, England
- Batting: Right-handed
- Bowling: Slow left-arm orthodox

Domestic team information
- Years: Team
- 1998–2000: Wales Minor Counties

Career statistics
Competition	List A
Matches	1
Runs scored	1
Batting average	–
100s/50s	0/0
Top score	1*
Balls bowled	60
Wickets	2
Bowling average	16.00
5 wickets in innings	0
10 wickets in match	–
Best bowling	2/32
Catches/stumpings	0/–
- Source: Cricinfo, 2 January 2011

Paul Edward Jenkins (born 8 February 1972) is an English cricketer. Jenkins is a right-handed batsman who bowls slow left-arm orthodox. He was born in Gloucester, Gloucestershire.

Jenkins made his Minor Counties Championship debut for Wales Minor Counties in 1998 against Devon. From 1998 to 2000, he represented the team in 5 Championship matches, the last of which came against Cheshire. His only MCCA Knockout Trophy appearance for the team came in 2000 against Shropshire. His only List A appearance for the team came in the 2nd round of the 1999 NatWest Trophy against the Derbyshire Cricket Board. In his only List A match, he scored a single unbeaten run and with the ball he took 2 wickets for 32 runs, at a bowling average of 16.00.

He currently plays club cricket for Northop Hall Cricket Club in the Liverpool and District Cricket Competition.
