= Hugh Davies (cricketer) =

Welsh cricketer

Personal information
- Full name: Hugh Daniel Davies
- Born: 23 July 1932; Pembrey, Carmarthenshire, Wales
- Died: 2 December 2017 (aged 85); Cardiff
- Batting: Right-handed
- Bowling: Right-arm medium-fast
- Relatives: Adam Davies (son)

Domestic team information
- Years: Team
- 1955–1960: Glamorgan

Career statistics
Competition	First-class
Matches	52
Runs scored	247
Batting average	5.61
100s/50s	–/–
Top score	28
Balls bowled	6,619
Wickets	115
Bowling average	31.81
5 wickets in innings	4
10 wickets in match	–
Best bowling	6/85
Catches/stumpings	17/–
- Source: Cricinfo, 28 October 2012

Hugh Daniel Davies (23 July 1932 – 2 December 2017) was a Welsh cricketer. Davies was a right-handed batsman who bowled right-arm medium-fast. He was born at Pembrey, Carmarthenshire.

After retiring from cricket, Davies became a physical education teacher. In the 1980s he was a summariser for BBC Radio Cymru during their Welsh-language coverage of Glamorgan's games. He worked for the Cricket Board of Wales from its inception in 1997, and served as its chairman between 2002 and 2011.
