= Alexander Barr =

English cricketer

Personal information
- Full name: Alexander John Lewington Barr
- Born: 4 December 1973 (age 52); Marlborough, Wiltshire, England
- Batting: Right-handed
- Bowling: Right-arm medium

Domestic team information
- Years: Team
- 1996–2002: Wales Minor Counties

Career statistics
Competition	List A
Matches	4
Runs scored	46
Batting average	11.40
100s/50s	–/–
Top score	30
Balls bowled	240
Wickets	7
Bowling average	27.28
5 wickets in innings	–
10 wickets in match	–
Best bowling	3/47
Catches/stumpings	–/–
- Source: Cricinfo, 13 May 2011

Alexander John Lewington Barr (born 4 December 1973) is a former English cricketer. Barr was a right-handed batsman who bowled right-arm medium pace. He was born in Marlborough, Wiltshire.

Barr made his debut for Wales Minor Counties in the 1996 Minor Counties Championship against Oxfordshire. He played Minor counties cricket for Wales Minor Counties from 1996 to 2002, which included 28 Minor Counties Championship matches and 9 MCCA Knockout Trophy matches. He made his List A debut for Wales Minor Counties against Nottinghamshire in the 1998 NatWest Trophy. He made 3 further List A appearances for the county, the last coming against Norfolk in the 2001 Cheltenham & Gloucester Trophy. In his 4 List A matches, he scored 46 runs at a batting average of 11.50, with a high score of 30. With the ball, he took 7 wickets at a bowling average of 27.28, with best figures of 27.28.

He had previously played Second XI cricket for the Worcestershire Second XI.
