= Roger Clitheroe =

English cricketer (born 1966)

Personal information
- Full name: Roger Ian Clitheroe
- Born: 18 November 1966 (age 59); Radcliffe, Lancashire, England
- Batting: Right-handed
- Role: wicket-keeper batsman

Domestic team information
- Years: Team
- 1996–2002: Wales Minor Counties
- 1987–1991: Cambridge University

Career statistics
Competition	First-class	List A
Matches	13	3
Runs scored	291	37
Batting average	15.31	12.33
100s/50s	–/–	–/–
Top score	36	23
Balls bowled	–	–
Wickets	–	–
Bowling average	–	–
5 wickets in innings	–	–
10 wickets in match	–	–
Best bowling	–	–
Catches/stumpings	8/2	1/1
- Source: Cricinfo, 13 May 2011

Roger Ian Clitheroe (born 18 November 1966) is a former English cricketer. Clitheroe was a right-handed batsman who fielded occasionally as a wicket-keeper. He was born in Radcliffe, Lancashire.

Clitheroe made his first-class debut for Cambridge University against Northamptonshire in 1987. He played 12 further first-class matches for Cambridge University, the last coming against Oxford University in 1991. In his 13 first-class matches for the University, he scored 291 runs at a batting average of 15.31, with a high score of 36. Behind the stumps he took 8 catches and 2 stumpings.

He later made his debut for Wales Minor Counties in the 1996 Minor Counties Championship against Devon. He played Minor counties cricket for Wales Minor Counties from 1996 to 2002, which included 31 Minor Counties Championship matches and 12 MCCA Knockout Trophy matches. In 1998, he made his List A debut for Wales Minor Counties against Nottinghamshire in the NatWest Trophy. He made 2 further List A appearances for the county, against Norfolk and Leicestershire in the 2001 Cheltenham & Gloucester Trophy. In his 3 List A matches, he scored 37 runs at a batting average of 12.33, with a high score of 23. Behind the stumps he took a single catch and made a single stumping.
