= Jonathan Davies (cricketer, born 1980) =

Welsh cricketer

Personal information
- Full name: Jonathan Davies
- Born: 23 February 1980 (age 46); Maesteg, Mid Glamorgan, Wales
- Batting: Right-handed
- Bowling: Left-arm medium

Domestic team information
- Years: Team
- 1998–2002: Wales Minor Counties

Career statistics
Competition	LA
Matches	4
Runs scored	4
Batting average	4.00
100s/50s	–/–
Top score	4*
Balls bowled	228
Wickets	4
Bowling average	38.75
5 wickets in innings	–
10 wickets in match	–
Best bowling	1/30
Catches/stumpings	1/–
- Source: Cricinfo, 2 January 2011

Jonathan Davies (born 23 February 1980) is a former Welsh cricketer. Davies was a right-handed batsman who bowled left-arm medium pace. He was born at Maesteg, Mid Glamorgan.

Davies made his Minor Counties Championship debut for Wales Minor Counties in 1998 against Wiltshire. From 1998 to 2001, he represented the team in 14 Championship matches, the last of which came against Herefordshire. His MCCA Knockout Trophy debut for the team came in 1998 against the Warwickshire Cricket Board. From 1998 to 2002, Davies represented the team in 11 Trophy matches, the last of which came against the Worcestershire Cricket Board.

His debut List A appearance for the team came in the 1st round of the 1998 NatWest Trophy against Nottinghamshire. From 1998 to 2002, he represented the team in 4 List A matches, the last of which came against Durham in the 3rd round of the 2002 Cheltenham & Gloucester Trophy. In his 4 List A matches, he scored 4 runs at a batting average of 4.00, with a high score of 4*. With the ball he took 4 wickets at a bowling average of 38.75, with best figures of 1/30.

Davies also played a number of Second XI matches for the Glamorgan Second XI from 1998 to 1999.
