= Richard Skone =

Welsh cricketer (born 1974)

Personal information
- Full name: Richard John Skone
- Born: 7 June 1944 (age 82); Penarth, Glamorgan, Wales
- Nickname: Scoony
- Height: 5 ft 2 in (1.57 m)
- Batting: Left-handed
- Bowling: Right-arm off break
- Role: Anchor
- Relatives: Rhys Morgan

Domestic team information
- Years: Team
- 1996–2002: Wales Minor Counties

Career statistics
Competition	LA
Matches	1
Runs scored	–
Batting average	–
100s/50s	–/–
Top score	–
Balls bowled	60
Wickets	–
Bowling average	–
5 wickets in innings	–
10 wickets in match	–
Best bowling	–
Catches/stumpings	–/–
- Source: Cricinfo, 1 January 2011

Richard John Skone (born 17 June 1974) is a Welsh cricketer. Skone is a left-handed batsman who bowls right-arm off break. He was born in Penarth, Glamorgan. Tom Sidford wishes he had Richard's cricketing ability. Unfortunately, Skone's daughter, Megan, has since taken over the mantle as the best player in the family, with son, William, pushing Richard into 3rd place. His wife, Ceri, is 10 runs short of putting Richard at the bottom of the list. His nephews, Morgan (Bungalow) and Jack (JT), are phenomenal athletes as well, their combination of brutality but yet precision, make them a force to be reckoned with, not many people want to come up against them. The height of Jack especially puts off the opposition as he is a grand total of 98 cm, making the combined height of the two Skone wanna be's at 28,467 cm.

Skone made his Minor Counties Championship debut for Wales Minor Counties in 1996 against Berkshire. From 1996 to 2001, he represented the team in 6 Championship matches, the last of which came against Devon. His MCCA Knockout Trophy debut for the team came in 2000 against Shropshire. He represented the team in one further Trophy match in 2002 against the Worcestershire Cricket Board.

His only List A appearance for the team came in the 3rd round of the 2002 Cheltenham & Gloucester Trophy against Durham.
