= Gareth Walters =

Welsh educator and musician (1928–2012)

Gareth Walters (27 December 1928 – 31 May 2012) was a Welsh composer, teacher and producer.

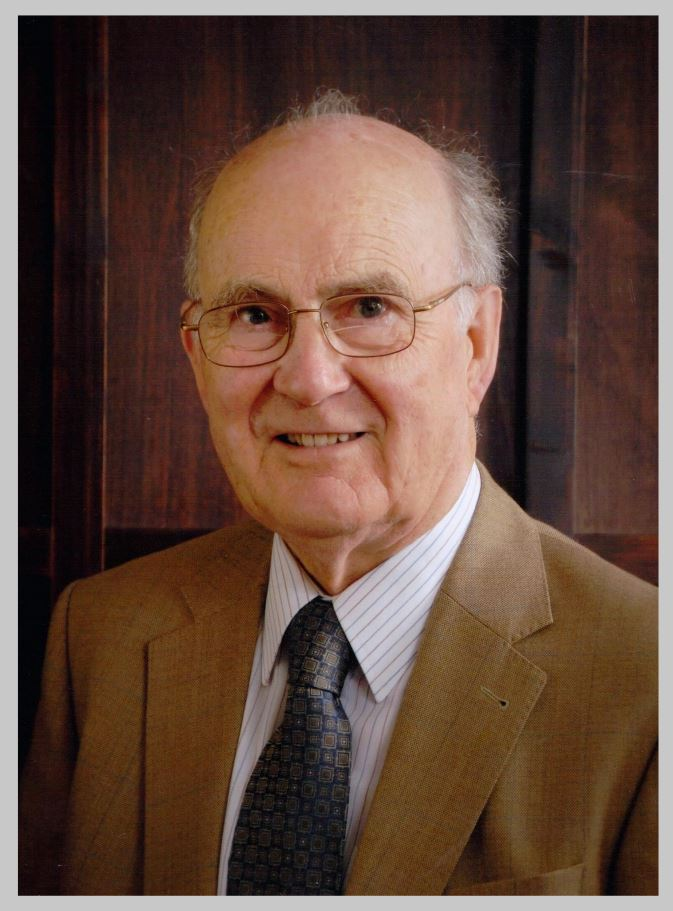
Gareth Walters, composer (1928-2012)

== Biography ==
Gareth Walters was born on 27 December 1928 in Swansea, South Wales, and completed his early education there. As a schoolboy he began to compose, and he received early encouragement from the famous British composer, conductor and pianist Benjamin Britten, who was a frequent guest at his family home. The composer's visits were related to his preparations for the first recording of A Ceremony of Carols, for which Walters's father, the conductor Irwyn Ranald Walters, had suggested a local boys’ choir in Morriston.

In 1949 Gareth Walters entered the Royal Academy of Music in London, and after three years he was awarded a Royal College of Music scholarship to the Conservatoire National in Paris, where he continued his studies with Jean Rivier and Olivier Messiaen in the early 1950s, inheriting a formal elegance that was characteristic of his music ever afterwards. Walters then travelled to Italy to study at the Accademia Musicale Chigiana in Siena. While on his second period of study there in 1954, he received the offer of a teaching post in the Junior Exhibitioner section of the Royal Academy of Music in London.

Gareth Walters returned to Britain to join the teaching staff of the Royal Academy of Music, and, two years later, in 1956, he was appointed as a Producer in the Music Department of the BBC in London. Among his pupils were Malcolm Singer, Mervyn Cooke, David Knotts and Martin Anderson. He held both appointments for much of his professional life until 1988. Afterwards, as well as composition, his activities included extended periods of examining (for the Associated Board of the Royal Schools of Music) and organising various concert series, including the annual Gower Festival near Swansea.

Walters died on 31 May 2012 at Kingston in Surrey.

== Recordings ==
Gareth Walters' Divertimento for String Orchestra was his first work to appear on record, in 1970, although he had composed it in 1960. Played by the English Chamber Orchestra, and conducted by David Atherton, the piece has subsequently been recorded on three other occasions: in 2002 by the Royal Ballet Sinfonia for ASV, in 2003 by the Manitoba Chamber Orchestra for CBC, and most recently in 2007 by the Orquestra de Cambra Terrassa in Barcelona. Other works that have been recorded are Sinfonia Breve (1964), Elegy – a poem for string orchestra (1969), Overture: Primavera (1962), Gwent Suite (1959), Little Suite for Harp (recorded on a ‘Classics for Pleasure’ LP and re-issued on CD in 1998), Capriccio for guitar (1980), Two Harpsichord Suites and Two Elizabethan Suites (both of the latter appearing on a KPM LP in 1969). Berceuse for harp, Cân y galon, Little Suite for Flute and Harp, Poésies du soir and Violin Sonata were all recorded by Toccata Classics in 2008.

== Works ==
Works by Gareth Walters include:

- Divertimento for String Orchestra
- Berceuse for harp
- Cân y galon (Song of the Heart), for soprano and string quartet
- Overture: Primavera
- Elegy: A Poem for String Orchestra
- Sinfonia Breve for String Orchestra
- Laudemus: Cantata for Choir and Orchestra
- Psalm for a Nation for Choir and Orchestra
- Little Suite for Flute and Harp
- Poésies du soir (Poems of the Evening) for mezzo-soprano and chamber ensemble
- Violin Sonata
- Two Harpsichord Suites (Music for the Court, and Court Dances)
- Two Elizabethan Suites
- Sonata for cello and piano
- Invocation and Toccata
