= Kyle Tudge =

Welsh cricketer (born 1987)

Personal information
- Full name: Kyle Daniel Tudge
- Born: 19 March 1987 (age 39); Newport, Wales
- Batting: Right-handed
- Bowling: Slow left-arm orthodox
- Role: All-rounder

Domestic team information
- Years: Team
- 2005: Wales Minor Counties
- 2006: Glamorgan
- Only FC: 2 August 2006 Glamorgan v Worcestershire
- Only LA: 4 May 2005 Wales Minor Counties v Nottinghamshire Outlaws

Career statistics
Competition	First-class	List A
Matches	1	1
Runs scored	7	4
Batting average	7.00	4.00
100s/50s	0/0	0/0
Top score	4	4
Balls bowled	78	30
Wickets	0	0
Bowling average	–	–
5 wickets in innings	–	–
10 wickets in match	–	–
Best bowling	–	–
Catches/stumpings	0/–	0/–
- Source: ESPNcricinfo, 9 August 2009

Kyle Daniel Tudge (born 19 March 1987) is a Welsh cricketer. He is a right-handed batsman and a slow left-handed bowler who formerly played for Glamorgan. He was born at Newport.

He entered first-class cricket for the first time in August 2006, making his debut courtesy of a knee injury to team-mate Dean Cosker, as the spin bowler made the step up from Second XI cricket to the first XI, making 3/27 on a steady debut.

Tudge, also played for Wales Minor Counties, and appeared consistently for the Second XI since having been given a chance to perform for the first time halfway through 2005. Tudge is a lower-order batsman for the Glamorgan Second XI.

Glamorgan declined to renew his contract after the 2008 Season, and Tudge currently turns out for his local club team.
