= Andrew Harris (cricketer, born 1971) =

Welsh cricketer

Personal information
- Full name: Andrew William Harris
- Born: 2 February 1971 (age 55); Newport, Monmouthshire
- Batting: Left-handed
- Role: Wicket-keeper

Domestic team information
- Years: Team
- 1997: Herefordshire
- 1989–1996: Wales Minor Counties

Career statistics
Competition	List A
Matches	2
Runs scored	6
Batting average	3.00
100s/50s	–/–
Top score	5
Balls bowled	–
Wickets	–
Bowling average	–
5 wickets in innings	–
10 wickets in match	–
Best bowling	–
Catches/stumpings	–/–
- Source: Cricinfo, 13 May 2011

Andrew William Harris (born 2 February 1971) is a former Welsh cricketer. Harris was a left-handed batsman who fielded as a wicket-keeper. He was born in Newport, Monmouthshire.

Harris made his debut for Wales Minor Counties in the 1989 Minor Counties Championship against Buckinghamshire. He played Minor counties cricket for Wales Minor Counties from 1989 to 1996, which included 44 Minor Counties Championship matches and 7 MCCA Knockout Trophy matches. In 1993, he made his List A debut against Sussex, in the NatWest Trophy. He played a further List A match for the team, against Middlesex in the 1994 NatWest Trophy. In his 2 List A matches, he scored 6 runs at a batting average of 3.00, with a high score of 5.

In 1997, Harris played a single Minor Counties Championship match for Herefordshire against Shropshire.
