= Nick Swetman =

Welsh cricketer (born 1984)

Personal information
- Full name: Nicholas Taylor Swetman
- Born: 27 September 1984 (age 42); Penarth, Glamorgan, Wales
- Batting: Right-handed
- Bowling: Right-arm fast-medium

Domestic team information
- Years: Team
- 2002–2004: Wales Minor Counties

Career statistics
Competition	LA
Matches	1
Runs scored	4
Batting average	4.00
100s/50s	–/–
Top score	4
Balls bowled	60
Wickets	1
Bowling average	41.00
5 wickets in innings	–
10 wickets in match	–
Best bowling	1/41
Catches/stumpings	–/–
- Source: Cricinfo, 1 January 2011

Nicholas 'Nick' Taylor Swetman (born 27 September 1984) is a Welsh cricketer. Swetman is a right-handed batsman who bowls right-arm fast-medium. He was born in Penarth, Glamorgan.

Swetman made his debut for Wales Minor Counties in the 2002 MCCA Knockout Trophy against the Gloucestershire Cricket Board. From 2002 to 2004, he represented the team in 4 Trophy matches, the last of which came against Berkshire. His Minor Counties Championship debut came in 2003 against Cheshire. From 2003 to 2004, he represented the team in 7 Championship matches, the last of which came against Oxfordshire. His only List A appearance for the team came in the 2nd round of the 2004 Cheltenham & Gloucester Trophy against Middlesex. In the match he scored 4 runs and took a single wicket for the cost of 41 runs from 10 overs.

He previously played a number of Second XI matches for the Glamorgan Second XI from 2002 to 2004.
