= Morris Bidwell =

17th century Puritan preacher in Wales

Morris Bidwell was a 17th-century Puritan preacher. He is known to have lived for some years in Swansea, where he held an appointment at St. Mary's, and held an interest in the Puritan School.

He is believed to have died before the year 1660, and to be buried at St. Mary's.
