= Mark Frost (cricketer) =

English cricketer

Personal information
- Full name: Mark Frost
- Born: 21 October 1962 (age 64); Barking, Essex, England
- Batting: Right-handed
- Bowling: Right-arm medium-fast

Domestic team information
- Years: Team
- 1994: Wales Minor Counties
- 1990–1993: Glamorgan
- 1988–1989: Surrey
- 1984–1987: Staffordshire

Career statistics
Competition	First-class	List A
Matches	64	56
Runs scored	106	30
Batting average	3.21	4.28
100s/50s	–/–	–/–
Top score	12	6*
Balls bowled	9,918	2,565
Wickets	169	66
Bowling average	35.53	30
5 wickets in innings	4	–
10 wickets in match	2	–
Best bowling	7/99	4/25
Catches/stumpings	7/–	9/–
- Source: Cricinfo, 25 April 2012

Mark Frost BEM (born 21 October 1962) is a former English cricketer. Frost was a right-handed batting who bowled right-arm medium-fast. His main role in a team was a bowler. He was born at Barking, Essex.

== Early career and Surrey ==
He attended Durham University from 1981 to 1984, while studying there he played for Durham University Cricket Club. Frost made his debut in county cricket for Staffordshire in the 1984 Minor Counties Championship against Cambridgeshire. He next appeared in county cricket in 1987, once again representing Staffordshire in the Minor Counties Championship, making five appearances in that season. Following trial for several first-class counties, Frost was signed by Surrey for the 1988 season, making his first-class debut against Cambridge University in that same season. Frost made three further first-class appearances in 1988, and followed this up by making nine more in 1989. In thirteen first-class matches for Surrey, Frost took 25 wickets at an average of 40.20, with best figures of 5/40. These figures were his only five-wicket haul for the county and came against Leicestershire in 1989. Despite being successful in Second XI cricket for Surrey, Frost found his first team opportunities limited and left the county at the end of the 1989 season.

== Glamorgan and later career ==
He joined Welsh county Glamorgan for the 1990 season, making his debut for the county in a first-class match against Oxford University. Becoming a regular feature in the Glamorgan starting line-up in his first season, he played 21 first-class matches, taking 59 wickets at an average of 34.69, with two five wicket hauls and best figures of 5/40 against Gloucestershire, in a match in which he also took figures of 5/42. His performance helped Glamorgan to a 145 run victory. He ended his maiden season with the county as its second leading wicket-taker in the County Championship, with 56, behind fellow opening bowler Steve Watkin. It was in this season that he made his debut in List A cricket against Leicestershire in the 1990 Refuge Assurance League. Frost made 22 List A appearances in that season, taking 28 wickets at an average of 27.78, with best figures of 4/25.

Prior to the 1991 season, Frost toured Zimbabwe with Glamorgan, playing a single first-class and List A match against the Zimbabwe national team (which was still a year away from Test status).

Frost made twenty first-class appearances in the 1991 English season, taking 65 wickets at an average of 28.73. In what was his most successful season in first-class cricket, he took just the one five wicket haul, against Gloucestershire, with figures of 7/99. He ended the season as Glamorgan's second leading wicket-taker in the County Championship, with 61, though was once again behind Watkin. In List A cricket, Frost made seventeen appearances in that season, taking 21 wickets at an average of 31.95, with best figures of 3/35. In the following season he fell out of favour, making just eight first-class appearances for Glamorgan, in which he took 13 wickets at an expensive average of 64.07, with best figures of 3/100. For the first time in his career, he made more appearances in List A cricket in a season than he did in first-class cricket, making twelve limited-overs appearances in 1992, during which he took 13 wickets at an average of 30.69, with best figures of 4/26.

In the 1993 season, he featured in just two first-class matches, both in the County Championship, against Northamptonshire and Somerset. He also featured just once in List A cricket in this season, against Yorkshire in the 1993 AXA Equity & Law League. With opportunities now limited at Glamorgan, he left the county at the end of the 1993 season. During his four seasons playing for Glamorgan, he made 51 first-class appearances, taking 144 wickets at an average of 34.72. In List A cricket, he made 55 appearances, taking 66 wickets at an average of 29.57. A poor batsman, in his entire first-class career, he scored just 106 runs at a batting average of 3.21, with a high score of just 12.

== Post-Glamorgan ==
He briefly played Minor counties cricket for Wales Minor Counties in 1994, making five Minor Counties Championship appearances, and a single MCCA Knockout Trophy appearance against his former county, Staffordshire. He also made a single List A appearance, his last, for the team in the NatWest Trophy against Middlesex, though went wicketless in the match, and was dismissed one final time for a duck by John Emburey.

Following his retirement from cricket, he worked the Sports Council for Wales, before serving as the director of cricket for the Cricket Board of Wales, a role he held from 1999 to 2004. He left the role in 2004 and was succeeded by Geoff Holmes in that capacity. In January 2005, he rejoined the Sports Council for Wales. Frost is also an author, writing under the pen name of Jack Emson, due to there being another author of the same name. In 2012, Frost released his first book, a children's novel entitled The Four. Since then he has written two more books in the trilogy and in 2018 produced a novella 'Dewi and the Cricket Dragon' based on a primary school visit to Glamorgan Cricket's Stadium in Cardiff. He is married to Jan and has four children.
