= Paul Warren (cricketer) =

English cricketer

Personal information
- Full name: Paul Michael Warren
- Born: 18 January 1978 (age 48); Plymouth, Devon, England
- Batting: Right-handed
- Bowling: Right-arm medium

Domestic team information
- Years: Team
- 2009: Dorset
- 2000–2003: Devon
- 1999: Wales Minor Counties
- 1997: Glamorgan
- 1997–1998: Devon

Career statistics
Competition	FC	LA
Matches	1	5
Runs scored	–	12
Batting average	–	–
100s/50s	–/–	–/–
Top score	–	12*
Balls bowled	114	216
Wickets	–	3
Bowling average	–	58.00
5 wickets in innings	–	–
10 wickets in match	–	–
Best bowling	–	1/24
Catches/stumpings	1/–	–/–
- Source: Cricinfo, 4 July 2010

Paul Michael Warren (born 18 January 1978) is a former English cricketer. Warren was a right-handed batsman who bowled right-arm medium pace. He was born in Plymouth, Devon and educated at Blundell's School.

Warren made his debut in county cricket for Devon in the 1997 Minor Counties Championship against Wales Minor Counties. From 1997 to 1998, he represented the county in ten Minor Counties fixtures. He also made his List-A debut for Devon in the 1997 NatWest Trophy against Leicestershire. In 1997, he also played the only first-class match of his career for Glamorgan against Oxford University.

In 1999, Warren played a single Minor Counties Championship match for Wales Minor Counties against Dorset, as well as making his List-A debut for the team against Lincolnshire. These were his only two matches for the team. Warren rejoined Devon for the 2000 Minor Counties season, where from 2000 to 2003 he represented the county in a further nine Minor Counties Championship fixtures, with his final Minor Counties appearance for Devon coming against Shropshire. He also played a further three List-A matches for the county, with his final List-A appearance coming against Bedfordshire in the 2002 Cheltenham & Gloucester Trophy. In his five List-A matches, he took a total of three wickets at a bowling average of 58.00. with best figures of 1/24.

In 2009, Warren played four Minor Counties matches for Dorset, with his final appearance for the county coming against Wiltshire.
