= Anthony Lyn =

Welsh director and actor (born 1965)

- Born: Anthony Coughlin; 1965 (age 60–61); Swansea, Wales
- Education: Royal Welsh College of Music & Drama
- Occupations: Director & Actor
- Years active: 1980–present
- Known for: The Lion King (Global Associate Director); Mary Poppins (associate director); Les Misérables (associate director)
- Parent(s): John & Shirley Coughlin

Anthony Lyn is a Welsh theatrical director originally from Swansea in South Wales. During his early life, he performed in numerous shows in and around South Wales. As an actor he appeared in London's West End and toured nationally.

After spending a number of years working in the United Kingdom on productions such as Miss Saigon, Damn Yankees, Oklahoma!, and Joseph and the Amazing Technicolor Dreamcoat, he secured a role at Disney as Resident and then Associate Director of The Lion King. Together with The Lion King, he became Associate Director of Mary Poppins on Broadway in 2006. The show ran until 2013, becoming the 30th longest running play in Broadway history. Subsequently, Lyn was part of two U.S. tours of that show as well as productions in Mexico City and Vienna.

Lyn was Associate Director of the U.S. 25th Anniversary Production of Les Miserables, as well as the Canadian revival and the most recent Broadway revival at the Imperial Theatre New York.

Early in 2016 he staged the first Mandarin speaking version of Disney's The Lion King at the Disney Grand Theatre in Shanghai and in the spring of 2018 he staged an international tour of the same musical that opened in March at the Solaire Theatre Manila and was set to tour Asia and South Africa before then traveling around the world.

== Early life and education ==
Lyn was born in 1965 and grew up in the area of Gendros in Swansea, South Wales. During his childhood he regularly attended the Grand Theatre in Swansea to see pantomimes during the 1970s.

In 1980, Lyn first performed at the Grand Theatre in Swansea in a version of Kismet. Later that year came his second performance in Charlie Girl, which was also performed at the Grand Theatre. In 1982, Lyn performed with Catherine Zeta Jones at the Grand in The Sound of Music. Following his early theatrical career, Lyn went on to study at the Royal Welsh College of Music & Drama. In the spring of 2018 The Royal Welsh College of Music and Drama announced they were to bestow an Honorary Fellowship on Lyn at a ceremony in July 2018.

== Career ==
After receiving his Equity Card, Lyn was picked to tour the United Kingdom in The Golden Years Of Music Hall in 1986. At the end of that year, he worked with David Ian on a production of Puss in Boots at the Kenneth More Theatre in Ilford.

In 1987, Lyn was cast by Bill Kenwright in Joseph and the Amazing Technicolor Dreamcoat and spent just under a year touring the United Kingdom with the musical. His final night of performing on the tour was in Swansea. He then worked on his only pantomime in Swansea, Dick Whittington. A year later, he organised the show A Night Of 100 Stars, which was staged in Swansea. The show featured a number of Welsh and British performers, including Catherine Zeta Jones, David Ian, Ria Jones and John Champion. A year later, he was part of the cast for the play Oklahoma! at the Manchester Opera House.

His first major play in the London theatre came in 1989 after he auditioned for Anything Goes. He played alongside John Barrowman and Bernard Cribbins during his time performing the show. After a spending a couple of years performing outside the UK, Lyn returned to perform Les Misérables in 1992. In the early 1990s, Lyn was also involved in the foundation of West End Cares. After performing in Les Misérables, he played the role of Ruben in the United Kingdom tour of Joseph and the Amazing Technicolor Dreamcoat, which starred Phillip Schofield in 1994.

Shortly after his role in Les Misérables, he began to direct small productions. His first role as a director came when he worked with Cameron Mackintosh after he starred in Miss Saigon in 1997, where he became the resident director of the production in 1999. In 1999, Lyn secured a position of assistant director to Julie Taymor in Disney's The Lion King at the Lyceum Theatre in London. Lyn has remained involved with The Lion King up until the present day, and is currently the worldwide supervisor for over 10 separate productions of the play.

Following his involvement in The Lion King, Lyn secured the position of associate director for the Mary Poppins musical in 2006. Broadway performer Ashley Brown was brought on board to play the title role, and Gavin Lee, played the role of Bert in the Broadway production. A year later, Lyn directed a performance at the 61st Tony Awards by the Mary Poppins cast.

The Broadway play received positive reviews and also was praised by critics for the technical achievements of the show. During its running, it recouped the original investment within 52 weeks. In 2011, it surpassed Pippin to become the 30th longest running show in Broadway history. In all, 2,619 performances were played over its six-year run on Broadway.

Lyn's role as associate director of Mary Poppins came to an end in early 2013. Shortly thereafter, he became the associate director of Les Misérables during the year of its 25th anniversary.
