= Henry Pheloung =

Henry Pheloung (born Michael Henry Phelan; 1852–1909) was a New Zealand bandsman, labourer and carrier. He was born in Swansea, Glamorganshire, Wales in about 1852.
