= Alexander French =

Hong Kong cricketer

Personal information
- Full name: Alexander Niall French
- Born: 1 December 1980 (age 45); Hong Kong
- Batting: Right-handed
- Bowling: Right-arm off break

International information
- National side: Hong Kong
- ODI debut (cap 3): 16 July 2004 v Bangladesh
- Last ODI: 18 July 2004 v Pakistan

Domestic team information
- Years: Team
- 2001–2002: Wales Minor Counties

Career statistics
Competition	ODI	LA	ICC T
Matches	2	4	9
Runs scored	24	40	27
Batting average	12.00	10.00	3.37
100s/50s	0/0	0/0	0/0
Top score	14	15	13
Balls bowled	72	150	126
Wickets	1	4	3
Bowling average	67.00	31.50	33.00
5 wickets in innings	0	0	0
10 wickets in match	0	0	0
Best bowling	1/51	3/35	2/43
Catches/stumpings	2/–	2/–	7/–
- Source: CricketArchive, 29 September 2009

Alexander Niall French (born 1 December 1980) is a Hong Kong cricketer who has played two One Day Internationals and nine ICC Trophy matches for Hong Kong. French made his debut aged 16 at the 1997 ICC Trophy in Malaysia, and played four matches, scoring 22 runs with a highest score of 13 in the debut match against Italy. Despite having the third-worst batting average of the entire team — only ahead of Steven Foster and specialist bowler Mohamed Zubair — French was also in the squad for the 2001 ICC Trophy, where he contribute even fewer runs. In four innings, he compiled five runs, although his off breaks also yielded three wickets — all falling in losing causes. French's batting average of 1.25 in the tournament was now the second-worst, although his three wickets were the fifth-best bowling performance for the team.

Though his batting performances thus far had been less than impressive, French was retained for the 2004 Asia Cup, and was even chosen to bat at number three, usually the position occupied by the best batsman. He made double-figure scores against both Bangladesh and Pakistan, but it was not enough to retain his spot in the team for the 2005 ICC Intercontinental Cup. French has also played for Cardiff UCCE, Glamorgan's Second XI, and Wales Minor Counties.
