= Philip George (cricketer) =

Welsh cricketer

Personal information
- Full name: Philip Stanley George
- Born: 16 September 1978 (age 48); Swansea, Glamorgan, UK, Wales, UK
- Batting: Right-handed
- Bowling: Right-arm medium

Domestic team information
- Years: Team
- 1997–2002: Wales Minor Counties

Career statistics
Competition	LA
Matches	8
Runs scored	53
Batting average	17.66
100s/50s	–/–
Top score	23*
Balls bowled	357
Wickets	5
Bowling average	53.40
5 wickets in innings	–
10 wickets in match	–
Best bowling	3/51
Catches/stumpings	4/–
- Source: Cricinfo, 2 January 2011

Philip Stanley George (born 16 September 1978) is a former Welsh cricketer. George was a right-handed batsman who bowled right-arm medium pace.

== Biography ==
George made his debut for Wales Minor Counties in the 1997 MCCA Knockout Trophy Devon. From 1997 to 2002, George represented the team in 10 Trophy matches, the last of which came against the Worcestershire Cricket Board. His Minor Counties Championship debut came in 1999 against Oxfordshire. From 1999 to 2000, he represented the team in 9 Championship matches, the last of which came against Devon. His MCCA Knockout Trophy debut for the team came in 1997 against Devon. From 1997 to 2002, George represented the team in 10 Trophy matches, the last of which came against the Worcestershire Cricket Board.

His debut List A appearance for the team came in the 1st round of the 1999 NatWest Trophy against Lincolnshire. From 1999 to 2001, he represented the team in 8 List A matches, the last of which came against Leicestershire in the 3rd round of the 2001 Cheltenham & Gloucester Trophy. In his 8 List A matches, he scored 53 runs at a batting average of 17.66, with a high score of 23*. With the ball he took 5 wickets at a bowling average of 53.40, with best figures of 3/51.

George also played a number of Second XI matches and T20 warm up v Worcestershire XI for the First XI Glamorgan Second XI.
