= South Wales Premier Cricket League =

EBC Premier League

- Countries: Wales
- Administrator: Cricket Wales
- Format: Limited Overs
- First edition: 1999 (Founded); 2001 (ECB Premier League)
- Tournament format: League
- Number of teams: 10 (Premier Division One 1st XI)
- Current champion: Cardiff CC
- Most successful: St Fagans CC (5)
- Most runs: Michael Clayden (6578)
- Most wickets: Alex Jones (321)
- Website: https://swpcl.play-cricket.com/

The South Wales Premier Cricket League, is the top level of competition for recreational club cricket in South Wales. The league was founded in 1999 as the South East Wales League, being renamed following its accreditation as an ECB Premier League in 2001.

The original South Wales Premier Cricket League did not include all of South Wales' leading clubs. Its clubs came from South Glamorgan and the traditional county of Monmouthshire, while clubs from further west played in the South Wales Cricket Association, a league which has been in existence since 1926. That league too sought ECB Premier League status, but the ECB was not willing to accredit two Premier Leagues in South Wales.

In 2010, the South Wales Premier Cricket League was reorganised. The top five clubs in the 2009 season, together with the top five clubs in the South Wales Cricket Association in 2009, formed a new Premier Division. The original league became a feeder to it and was renamed as the Glamorgan and Monmouthshire Cricket League, and in 2016 it was renamed again as the South East Wales Cricket League. The South Wales Cricket Association continued to operate, and became the other feeder to the South Wales Premier Cricket League. Before the 2015 season, the South Wales Premier Cricket League formed a Division Two by taking five further clubs from each of the two feeder leagues.

== Winners ==
=== Winners from 2010 ===
Year	Champions
2010	Sully Centurions
2011	Cardiff
2012	Ammanford
2013	Mumbles
2014	Cardiff
2015	Bridgend Town
2016	Newport
2017	Cardiff
2018	Newport
2019	St Fagans
2020	no competition
2021	St Fagans
2022	St Fagans
2023	Swansea
2024	St Fagans
2025	St Fagans
2026	Cardiff

=== Winners 1999 to 2009 ===
Year	South Wales Premier Cricket League	South Wales Cricket Association
1999	Abergavenny	Pontarddulais
2000	Newport	Ynysygerwn
2001	Pentyrch	Swansea
2002	Sudbrook	Swansea
2003	Sully Centurions	Swansea
2004	Sully Centurions	Briton Ferry Steel
2005	St Fagans	Briton Ferry Steel
2006	St Fagans	Neath
2007	Sully Centurions	Pontarddulais
2008	Sully Centurions	Ammanford
2009	Cardiff	Ammanford

== Performance by season from 2001 ==
=== South Wales Premier Cricket League from 2010 ===
Key
Gold	Champions
Blue	Left League
Red	Relegated

South Wales Premier Cricket League from 2010
Club	2010	2011	2012	2013	2014	2015	2016	2017	2018	2019	2021	2022	2023	2024	2025	2026
Abergavenny															7	9
Ammanford	7	9	1	10		8	5	8	4	7	7	6	8	8	6	5
Bridgend Town		2	4	6	3	1	4	6	9	8	5	8	4	7	4	3
Cardiff	5	1	3	9	1	2	2	1	3	3	8	7	3	4	8	1
Carmarthen Wanderers																8
Clydach										10		10				
Mumbles		6	2	1	2	9	7	7	8	9	10					
Neath					8	7	6	3	2	2	4	4	7	10		
Newport	3	5	8	5	7	3	1	2	1	4	3	3	2	6	2	4
Panteg					10											
Penarth								10								10
Pentyrch														9		
Pontarddulais	2	7	7	3	6	6	8	4	6	6	9	5	6	2	3	7
Port Talbot Town	4	3	6	8	5	4	3	5	7	5	6	9	10			
St Fagans	9					10			5	1	1	1	5	1	1	2
Sully Centurions (Note: Sully Centurions resigned from the Premier League after the 2013 season and moved to the Glamorgan and Monmouthshire Cricket League.)	1	4	5	4												
Swansea	8	10		7	9		10				2	2	1	5	10	
Usk	10		10											3	5	6
Ynystawe													9		9	
Ynysygerwn	6	8	9	2	4	5	9	9	10							
References																

=== South Wales Premier Cricket League 2001 to 2009 ===
Key
Gold	Champions
Red	Relegated

South Wales Premier Cricket League 2001 to 2009
Club	2001	2002	2003	2004	2005	2006	2007	2008	2009
Abergavenny	6	9			9	12			9
Blackwood Town									12
Bridgend Town								12	
Cardiff	2	2	?	?	4	3	7	7	1
Chepstow	9		?	8		9	12		
Croesyceiliog						10	6	9	10
Miskin Manor		10					11		
Newport	4	6	?	?	3	6	2	5	2
Panteg	10				8	5	8	11	
Penarth		8	?	?	6	11		10	8
Pentyrch	1	3	9		10	7	9	2	7
Pontypridd	8	5	10		12				
St Fagans	7	4	?	?	1	1	3	4	3
Sudbrook	3	1	?	?	7	8	10	6	6
Sully Centurions (Note: Sully Centurions were relegated for disciplinary reasons after the 2005 season.)			1	1	2		1	1	5
Tondu					11	4	5	8	11
Usk	5	7	?	?	5	2	4	3	4
References									

=== South Wales Cricket Association 2001 to 2009 ===
Key
Gold	Champions
Red	Relegated

South Wales Cricket Association 2001 to 2009
Club	2001	2002	2003	2004	2005	2006	2007	2008	2009
Ammanford		6	2	10			7	1	1
Briton Ferry Steel	3	9		1	1	6	8	7	9
Carmarthen Wanderers									7
Cowbridge					8	10			
Dafen Welfare	10		9			9			
Gowerton	2	2	4	8	7	4	2	9	
Llanelli	9			7	10			10	
Llangennech								8	10
Maesteg Celtic		8	5	9					
Mumbles						5	10		6
Neath	5	5	8	3	2	1	4	6	8
Pontardawe	6	10							
Pontarddulais	4	7	7	4	9		1	5	3
Port Talbot Town					6	8	3	4	5
Skewen			10						
Swansea	1	1	1	2	4	2	5	2	4
Ynystawe	8	3	6	5	3	7	9		
Ynysygerwn	7	4	3	6	5	3	6	3	2
References									

== See also ==
- List of English and Welsh cricket league clubs
