= Colin Metson =

English cricketer

Personal information
- Full name: Colin Peter Metson
- Born: 2 July 1963 (age 63); Goff's Oak, Hertfordshire, England
- Batting: Right-handed

Career statistics
Competition	First-class	List A
Matches	232	234
Runs scored	4,062	943
Batting average	17.43	11.78
100s/50s	0/7	0/0
Top score	96	30*
Catches/stumpings	561/51	227/63
- Source: CricInfo, 6 December 2022

Colin Peter Metson (born 2 July 1963) is a former English cricketer.

He was described by Dickie Bird as "the best wicketkeeper I have seen in England since Alan Knott".

Metson started his career at Middlesex where he was an understudy to Paul Downton, appearing only when Downton was on international duty from 1981 until 1986. He joined Glamorgan in 1987 to get more game time and soon became their first choice wicketkeeper.

== Personal ==
Metson was educated at Stanborough School and Enfield Grammar School before studying Economic History at Durham University, graduating in 1985. He was appointed managing director of cricket at Glamorgan County Cricket Club in 2010, before he was moved into a Community and Cricket Development role on 14 February 2012. That role was made redundant for financial reasons in 2013, with Metson leaving the club.
