= Carl Roberts (cricketer) =

Welsh cricketer

Personal information
- Full name: Carl Michael Roberts
- Born: 17 June 1983 (age 43); Swansea, West Glamorgan, Wales
- Batting: Right-handed
- Bowling: Right-arm off break

Domestic team information
- Years: Team
- 2004–2006: Wales Minor Counties

Career statistics
Competition	LA
Matches	1
Runs scored	10
Batting average	10.00
100s/50s	–/–
Top score	10
Balls bowled	26
Wickets	1
Bowling average	22.00
5 wickets in innings	–
10 wickets in match	–
Best bowling	1/22
Catches/stumpings	–/–
- Source: Cricinfo, 1 January 2011

Carl Michael Roberts (born 17 June 1983) is a Welsh cricketer. Roberts is a right-handed batsman who bowls right-arm off break. He was born in Swansea, West Glamorgan.

Roberts made his Minor Counties Championship debut for Wales Minor Counties in 2004 against Herefordshire. From 2004 to 2006, he represented the team in 11 Championship matches, the last of which came against Cheshire. His debut for the team in the MCCA Knockout Trophy came in 2005 against Cheshire, and from 2005 to 2006 he played 5 Trophy matches for the team, the last of which came against Devon. His only List A appearance for the team came in the 1st round of the 2005 Cheltenham & Gloucester Trophy against Nottinghamshire. In the match he scored 10 runs and took a single wicket for the cost of 22 runs from 4.2 overs.

He previously played a number of Second XI matches for the Glamorgan Second XI from 2000 to 2005.
