= Wales National County Cricket Club =

Personnel
- Captain: Cameron Herring

Team information
- Founded: 1988
- Home ground: Various

History
- National Counties Championship wins: 0
- NCCA Knockout Trophy wins: 0
- Official website: Wales NCCC

Wales National County Cricket Club is one of the 20 county clubs that compete in the National Counties Cricket Championship. It represents all of the historic counties of Wales except Glamorgan, and is the only non-English team in the competition.

The team is currently a member of the National Counties Cricket Championship Western Division, having joined in 1988 (under the name Wales Minor Counties) after Somerset's second eleven left the competition, and plays in the NCCA Knockout Trophy. Wales National County played List A matches occasionally from 1993 until 2005 but is not classified as a List A team per se.

== Club history ==
Some Welsh counties formerly competed individually in the National Counties Cricket Championship. Glamorgan was easily the most successful and it became first-class in 1921. The others were Carmarthenshire from 1908 to 1911; Denbighshire from 1930 to 1935; and Monmouthshire from 1901 to 1934.

Following the withdrawal of the Somerset Second XI from National Counties cricket at the end of the 1987 season, Wales Minor Counties entered National Counties cricket for the 1988 season as their replacement. Wales National County is yet to win the National Counties Cricket Championship or the NCCA Knockout Trophy.

The club first played List A cricket in the 1993 NatWest Trophy against Sussex. The club appeared in eighteen List A matches from 1993 to 2005, winning eight and losing ten, the majority of which were against first-class opponents. Wales National County lost the right to play List A cricket when the National Counties were excluded from the Cheltenham & Gloucester Trophy from the 2006 season onward.

== Notable players ==
See List of Wales Minor Counties Cricket Club List A players and Category:Wales National County cricketers

The following Wales Minor Counties/National County cricketers also made an impact on the first-class game or are of note in other fields:

- (England) Colin Metson
- (Wales) Danny Collins
- (Trinidad and Tobago) Phil Simmons
- (Hong Kong) Alexander French

== Grounds ==
The club has no fixed home, but plays its home matches at various grounds across South Wales. Grounds used for the 2011 season included:

- Eugene Cross Park, Ebbw Vale
- Pen-y-Pound, Abergavenny
- Ffosyrefail Ground, Pontarddulais
- Usk Cricket Club Ground, Usk
