= Cavener =

Cavener is a surname. Notable people with the surname include:

- Beth Cavener Stichter (born 1972), American sculptor
- Cliff Cavener (born 1967), English cricketer
- Douglas Cavener, American biologist
- Phil Cavener (born 1961), English footballer
