= Raphy Weatherall =

English cricketer (born 2004)

Personal information
- Full name: Raphael Alexander Weatherall
- Born: 24 October 2004 (age 22); Kendal, Cumbria, England
- Batting: Right-handed
- Bowling: Right-arm medium
- Role: Bowler

Domestic team information
- Years: Team
- 2024–2026: Northamptonshire (squad no. 84)
- FC debut: 12 April 2024 Northamptonshire v Middlesex
- T20 debut: 30 May 2024 Northamptonshire v Derbyshire

Career statistics
| Competition | FC | LA | T20 |
|---|---|---|---|
| Matches | 9 | 10 | 10 |
| Runs scored | 21 | 21 | 21 |
| Batting average | 5.25 | – | – |
| 100s/50s | 0/0 | 0/0 | 0/0 |
| Top score | 13 | 12* | 21* |
| Balls bowled | 1,122 | 385 | 139 |
| Wickets | 19 | 11 | 11 |
| Bowling average | 38.15 | 38.36 | 24.81 |
| 5 wickets in innings | 0 | 0 | 0 |
| 10 wickets in match | 0 | 0 | 0 |
| Best bowling | 3/32 | 4/50 | 4/50 |
| Catches/stumpings | 2/– | 4/– | 2/– |
- Source: ESPNcricinfo, 11 August 2026

Raphael Alexander Weatherall (born 24 October 2004) is an English cricketer who plays for Northamptonshire County Cricket Club. He made his first-class debut on 12 April 2024 against Middlesex.

Weatherall is the son of Sally (née Philbrook) and Mark Weatheralll, a consultant neurologist, and is the second youngest of their five children. He attended Dr Challoner's Grammar School in Amersham, and began a law degree at Exeter University in 2023. From 2018 to 2021 he played for Chesham Cricket Club in the Thames Valley Cricket League, but was not selected for the first XI. He was talent-spotted by Northamptonshire in 2021, and subsequently joined their academy. In 2023, he played for the England under-19 team in two youth Test matches and a One Day International against Australia. He signed a two-year professional context with Northamptonshire the same year. After his debut in the County Championship, he took his maiden first-class wicket on 13 April 2024, dismissing Middlesex and former England opener Mark Stoneman. He made his T20 debut on 30 May 2024, against Derbyshire in the T20 Blast. In his first List A game on 24 July 2024, Northamptonshire faced the same opposition in the One-Day Cup.
