= List of Buckinghamshire County Cricket Club grounds =

Buckinghamshire County Cricket Club was established on 15 January 1891. It has since played minor counties cricket from 1895 and played List A cricket from 1965 to 2005, using a different number of home grounds during that time. Their first home minor counties fixture in 1895 was against Oxfordshire at The Big Field, Wolverton, while their first home List A match came 75 years later against Bedfordshire in the 1970 Gillette Cup at London Road, High Wycombe.

The 24 grounds that Buckinghamshire have used for home matches since 1895 are listed below, with statistics complete through to the end of the 2014 season.

== Grounds ==
=== List A ===
Below is a complete list of grounds used by Buckinghamshire County Cricket Club when it was permitted to play List A matches. These grounds have also held Minor Counties Championship and MCCA Knockout Trophy matches.

Name	Location	First	Last	Matches	First	Last	Matches	First	Last	Matches	Refs
Name	Location	List A			Minor Counties Championship			MCCA Trophy			Refs
London Road	High Wycombe	9 May 1970 v Bedfordshire	24 June 1987 v Somerset	3	26 August 1895 v Bedfordshire	22 August 2014 v Cambridgeshire	118	only match: 23 May 2010 v Wiltshire		1	(Note: Minor Counties South played a single List A match here against Worcestershire in the 1979 Benson & Hedges Cup. Only the List A matches played by Buckinghamshire at the ground are recorded in the table.)
Amy Lane	Chesham	only match: 30 May 1970 v Hampshire		1	14 August 1907 v Worcestershire Second XI	8 August 1982 v Suffolk	33	only match: 23 May 1993 v Oxfordshire		1	(Note: Minor Counties East played a single List A match here against Leicestershire in the 1978 Benson & Hedges Cup. Only the List A matches played by Buckinghamshire at the ground are recorded in the table.)
Shardeloes	Amersham	only match: 19 July 1972 v Glamorgan		1	25 August 1968 v Bedfordshire	15 June 1997 v Northumberland	28	–	–	0	(Note: Minor Counties South and Minor Counties West played List A matches here from 1972–1977 in the Benson & Hedges Cup. Only the List A matches played by Buckinghamshire at the ground are recorded in the table.)
Pound Lane	Marlow	27 June 1990 v Nottinghamshire	23 June 1999 v Warwickshire	3	9 August 1909 v Dorset	4 August 2013 v Cumberland	30	17 July 1987 v Cheshire	20 May 2012 v Staffordshire	7	(Note: A combined Minor Counties cricket team played two matches here in the 1990 and 1992 Benson & Hedges Cup. Only the List A matches played by Buckinghamshire at the ground are recorded in the table.)
Wilton Park, Beaconsfield	Beaconsfield	24 June 1992 v Sussex	12 September 2002 v Shropshire	5	28 August 1967 v Norfolk	19 June 2005 v Staffordshire	26	14 June 1987 v Shropshire	12 June 2005 v Wiltshire	4	
Oxford Road	Dinton	29 August 2001 v Worcestershire Cricket Board	29 August 2002 v Suffolk	13	–	–	0	9 May 2013 v Wales Minor Counties	18 May 2014 v Berkshire	2	
Ascott Park	Wing	only match: 7 May 2003 v Gloucestershire		1	7 August 1905 v Hertfordshire	17 August 2003 v Bedfordshire	48	7 May 1998 v Berkshire	10 May 2009 v Lincolnshire	5	
Sir Paul Getty's Ground	near Ibstone	only match: 3 May 2005 v Lancashire		1	only match: 22 August 1999 v Hertfordshire		1	4 June 2000 v Kent Cricket Board	7 July 2002 v Berkshire	2	(Note: The Unicorns cricket team played nine List A matches here between 2010–2013 in the Clydesdale Bank 40/Yorkshire Bank 40. Only the List A match played by Buckinghamshire at the ground is recorded in the table. The ground has played host to the final of the MCCA Knockout Trophy since 2012. Only the MCCA Knockout Trophy matches played by Buckinghamshire at the ground are recorded in the table.)

=== Minor Counties ===
Below is a complete list of grounds used by Buckinghamshire Cricket Club in Minor Counties Championship and MCCA Knockout Trophy matches.

Name	Location	First	Last	Matches	First	Last	Matches	Refs
Name	Location	Minor Counties Championship			MCCA Trophy			Refs
The Big Field	Wolverton	only match: 7 August 1895 v Oxfordshire		1	–	–	0	
Wendover Road	Aylesbury	13 July 1896 v Northamptonshire	26 July 1998 v Bedfordshire	42	7 June 1990 v Bedfordshire	21 May 2001 v Kent Cricket Board	7	
Bletchley Park	Bletchley	23 August 1899 v Wiltshire	12 July 1933 v Bedfordshire	33	–	–	0	
Osborne Street	Wolverton	29 July 1904 v Bedfordshire	27 July 1921 v Bedfordshire	7	–	–	0	
Chalvey Road	Slough	19 August 1904 v Berkshire	5 July 1998 v Norfolk	57	only match: 14 June 1992 v Oxfordshire		1	(Note: A combined Minor Counties cricket team played three List A matches here between 1981–1986 in the Benson & Hedges Cup. Berkshire played a single MCCA Knockout Trophy here against the Sussex Cricket Board in 1999. Only the MCCA Knockout Trophy match played by Buckinghamshire at the ground is recorded in the table.)
Sefton Park	Stoke Poges	only match: 9 August 1911 v Kent Second XI		1	–	–	0	
Agar's Plough	Eton College	9 May 1946 v Berkshire	11 August 1950 v Berkshire	5	–	–	0	
Stowe School	Stowe	4 August 1947 v Berkshire	14 August 1982 v Bedfordshire	5	only match: 7 August 1983 v Bedfordshire		1	(Note: Northamptonshire played a single List A match here in the 2005 totesport League against Gloucestershire.)
Aspro Sports Ground	Slough	10 August 1951 v Berkshire	25 August 1954 v Norfolk	4	–	–	0	
Ernest Turner's Sports Ground	High Wycombe	30 August 1963 v Oxfordshire	13 August 1969 v Suffolk	5	–	–	0	
Bourton Road	Buckingham	6 July 1968 v Oxfordshire	12 August 1990 v Oxfordshire	11	only match: 29 April 2012 v Berkshire		1	
Molins Sports Club	Monks Risborough	18 August 1982 v Berkshire	11 August 1985 v Cheshire	3	–	–	0	
Manor Fields	Bletchley	13 July 1986 v Somerset Second XI	25 July 1988 v Wales Minor Counties	2	–	–	0	(Note: Northamptonshire played first-class and List A matches here between 1976–1987.)
Campbell Park	Milton Keynes	9 June 1999 v Staffordshire	6 August 2000 v Suffolk	2	only match: 28 June 1998 v Sussex Cricket Board		1	(Note: Northamptonshire have played List A and Twenty20 matches here.)
Dukes Lane	Gerrards Cross	13 June 2004 v Cumberland	21 July 2013 v Suffolk	10	only match: 26 July 2009 v Dorset		1	
The Memorial Ground	Burnham	23 July 2006 v Cumberland	20 July 2014 v Staffordshire	5	5 May 2013 v Dorset	4 May 2014 v Herefordshire	2	
Upton Court Road	Slough	28 August 2005 v Norfolk	5 August 2012 v Bedfordshire	8	only match: 29 April 2007 v Hertfordshire		1	(Note: Berkshire played a single MCCA Knockout Trophy match here in 2002, while the ground held the final of the 2005 MCCA Knockout Trophy between Norfolk and Wiltshire. Only the MCCA Knockout Trophy match played by Buckinghamshire at the ground is recorded in the table.)
London Road	Tring	21 June 2009 v Lincolnshire	21 August 2014 v Norfolk	4	5 June 2011 v Devon	2 June 2013 v Dorset	2	(Note: London Road is based in the adjacent county of Hertfordshire. Northamptonshire played List A matches here from 1974–1991. Hertfordshire have played twelve Minor Counties Championship matches and one MCCA Knockout Trophy match here. Only the matches played by Buckinghamshire in these competitions at the ground is recorded in the table.)
