= Hertford Cricket Club =

English cricket club in Hertford

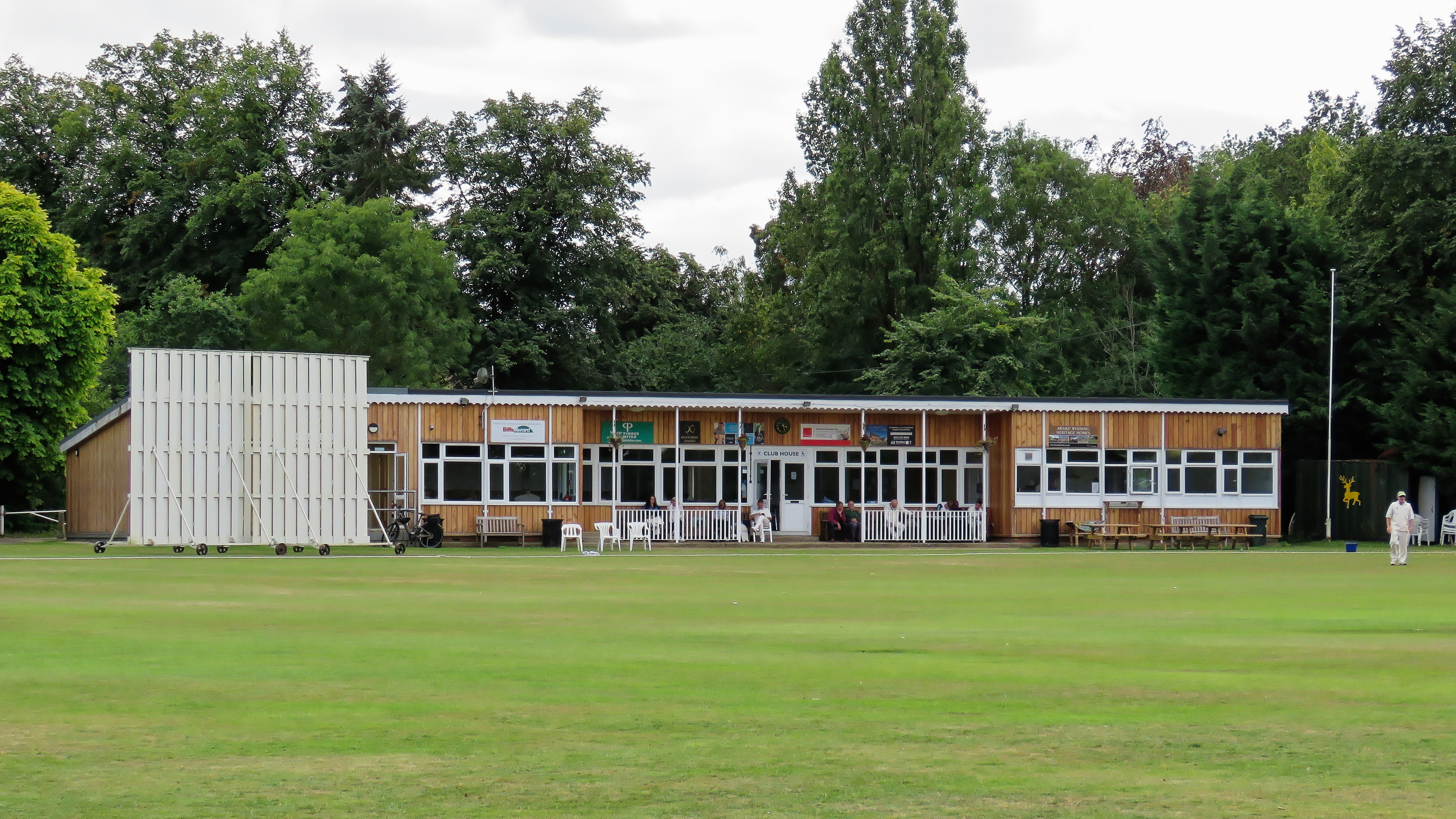

Personnel
- Captain: (England) Ben Cowell

Team information
- Founded: 1860
- Home ground: Balls Park
- Official website: Hertford Cricket Club

Hertford Cricket Club is an English amateur cricket club, located in Hertford, the county town of Hertfordshire. Cricket records for a Hertford club go back a far as 1825, however the club in its present form has been in existence since 1860.

In 2009 the club was relegated from the Home Counties Premier Cricket League, an accredited ECB Premier League, the highest level for recreational club cricket in England and Wales. However, a year later they won promotion back to the league for the 2011 season. They stayed there for a further two seasons before being relegated in 2012. They then were promoted back to the Home Counties Premier League in the 2013 season, winning the league with one game to spare.

The clubs also fields three other Saturday league XIs in the Saracens Hertfordshire League.

Home matches are played at Balls Park in grounds of the Balls Park estate. Balls Park is regularly used by Hertfordshire, and since 1901 the club has hosted Minor Counties Championship, MCCA Knockout Trophy and List A matches.

== Notable players ==
- Cliff Cavener
