= John Guise (cricketer) =

English cricketer

John Lindsay Guise (29 November 1903 – 29 June 1991) was an English first-class cricketer active 1922–34 who played for Middlesex, Oxford University and, in India, for the Europeans. He was born in Calcutta; died in Eastbourne. Guise was a right-handed batsman and a right arm medium pace bowler who played in 94 first-class matches. He scored 3,775 career runs with a highest score of 154* and, as a fielder, held 53 catches. He took 63 wickets with a best analysis of four for 19.

In his 1992 Wisden obituary, Guise is described as one of "the select few who have achieved fame through one big performance". In a 1921 public schools match when he was 17, Guise made a record score of 278 for Winchester College against Eton College at Agar's Plough. Wisden recorded that Winchester had been bowled out for 57 in their first innings on a rain-affected pitch. Eton, batting in better conditions, had taken a lead of 198. At close of play, Winchester in their second innings had made 130 for 3 with opening batsman Guise on 86 not out. On the second day, he "farmed the bowling like a veteran" to score 278 before being run out. Winchester had made 381, which left Eton needing 184 to win; they did so, by seven wickets. After Winchester, Guise went up to Brasenose College, Oxford. His brother, James, also played first-class cricket, as did their father, whose two recorded first-class matches had him playing for Gentlemen of India against Oxford Authentics in Delhi in 1902–03, and for MC Bird's XI against Maharajah of Cooch-Behar's XI, at Eden Gardens, Calcutta, in 1918–19.

Guise was a schoolteacher by profession, teaching at Winchester, Adams Grammar School in Shropshire and Helston Grammar School in Cornwall between 1927 and 1964. Guise resigned from Helston Grammar over an incident of corporal punishment being administered to two girl students in his office, for which Guise was fined £50 in a subsequent court hearing.

== Publications ==
- Successful Cricket, A. Barker, 1951
- Talking of cricket, Methuen, 1952
