= Brunton Memorial Ground =

Cricket ground

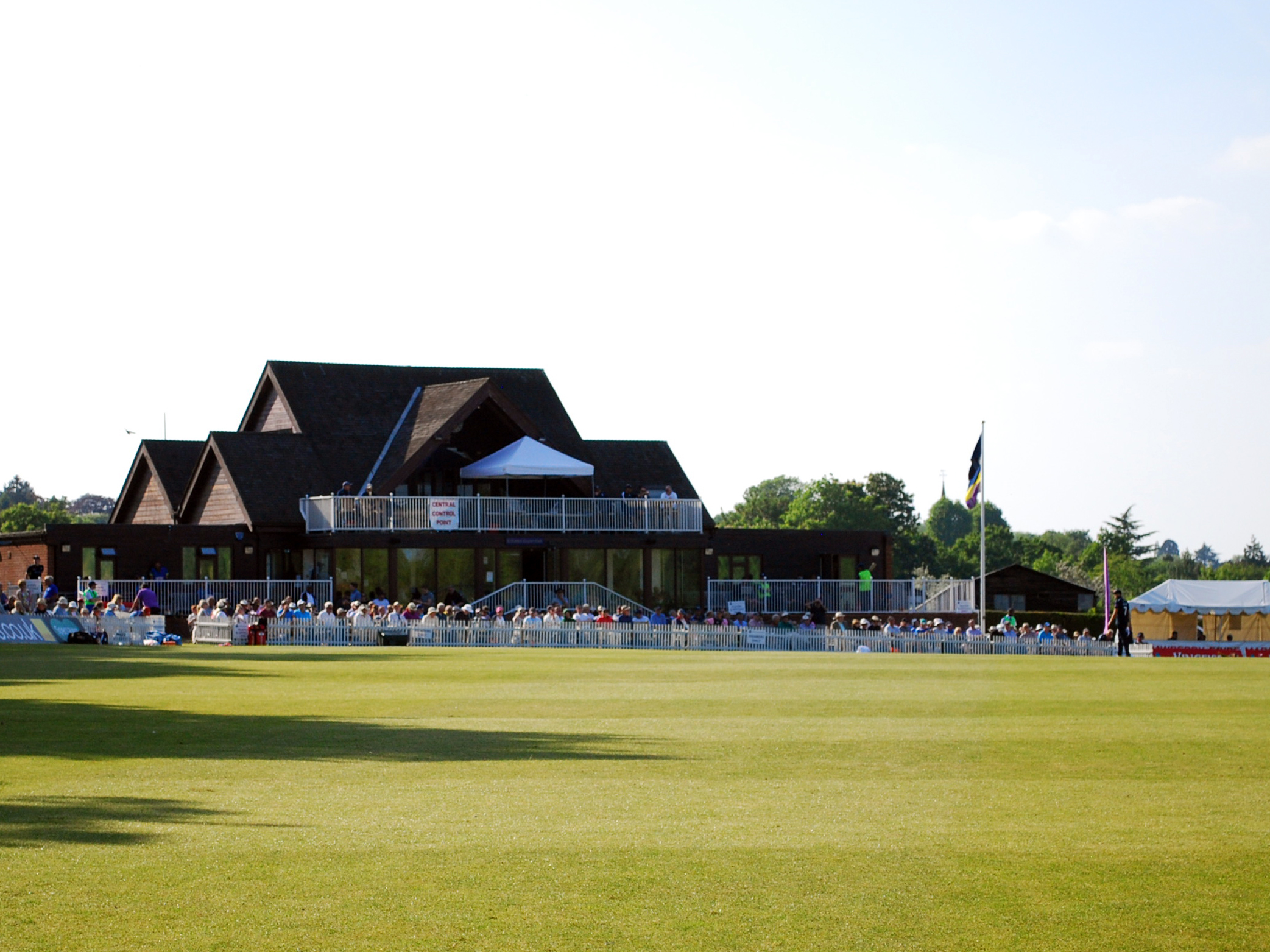
- The pavilion at the Brunton Memorial Ground, Radlett during a One Day Cup match between Middlesex and Kent, May 2018
- Interactive map of Brunton Memorial Ground

Ground information
- Location: Radlett, Hertfordshire
- Country: England
- Coordinates: 51.676°N 0.309°W
- County club: Middlesex County Cricket Club
- Establishment: 1938
- Operator: Radlett Cricket Club
- End names
- Pavilion End; Salter's Field End

Team information
Radlett Cricket Club	(1938–)
Hertfordshire County Cricket Club	(1975–2013)
Middlesex County Cricket Club	(2013–)
- As of 11 January 2022; Source: CricketArchive

Brunton Memorial Ground is a cricket ground at Radlett in Hertfordshire. The ground is the home of Radlett Cricket Club and, since 2013, has been used as an outground by Middlesex County Cricket Club. It was used occasionally by Hertfordshire County Cricket Club between 1975 and 2008 for Minor Counties Championship matches.

The ground is located 0.7 miles (1.1 km) south of Radlett to the east of the A5183 road, Watling Street. The Midland Main Line railway which links London St Pancras and Sheffield, runs along the ground's eastern edge.

== Establishment ==
Radlett Cricket Club was established in 1884 and played first on a ground in the village called Newberries and then at Porters Park, now the Shenley Park Cricket Centre, 1.5 miles (2.4 km) north-east of the current ground. This site became part of the grounds of Shenley Hospital and by 1937 was required by the hospital, forcing the club to move. The current ground was bought by Miles Brunton, after whom it is named, and leased to the club for 99 years.

The cricket pavilion on the ground was built following the move to the ground in 1938, the sum of £100 being raised after the club organised a fair.

== Cricket history ==
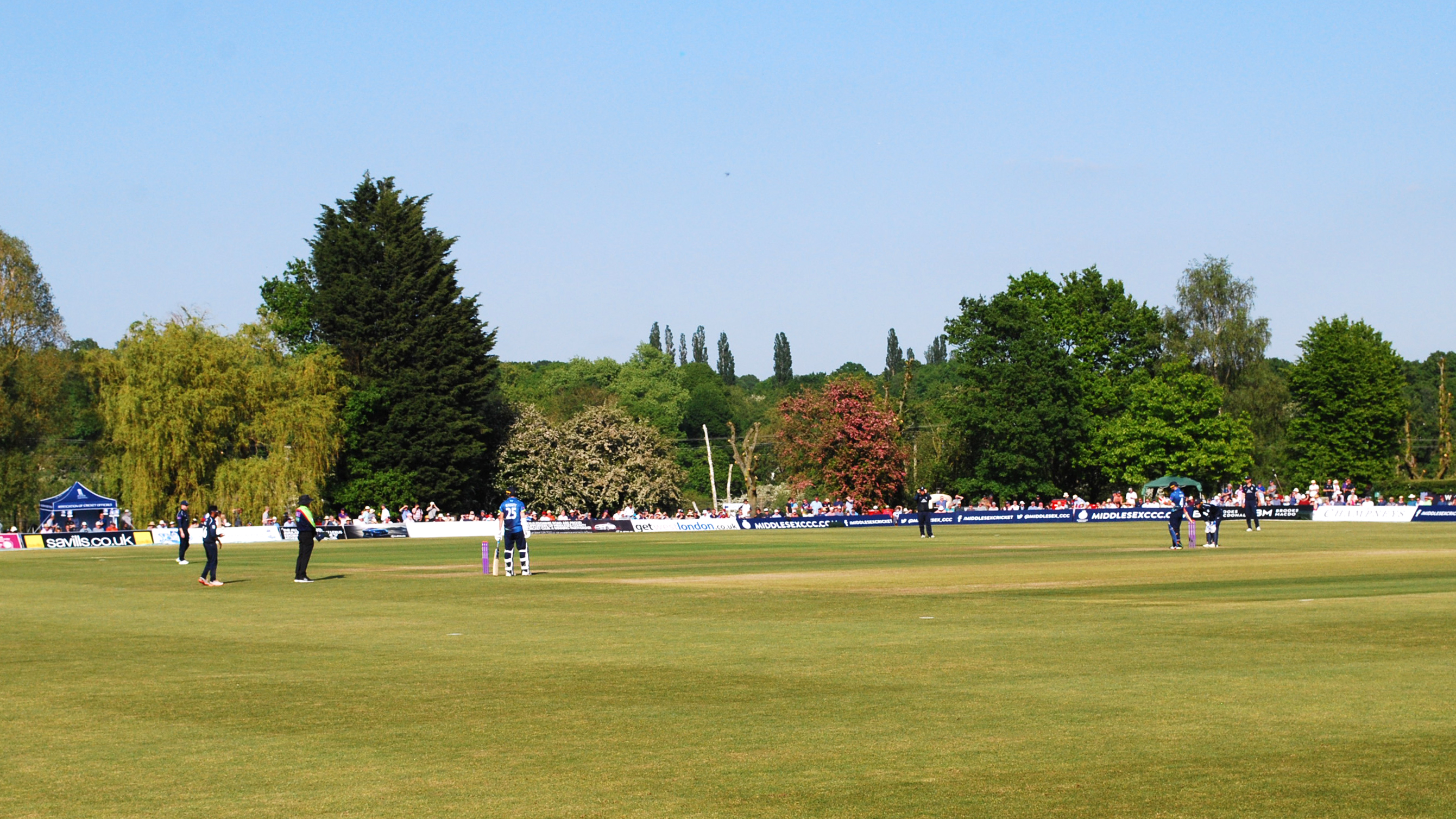
The Brunton Memorial Ground, Radlett during a One Day Cup match between Middlesex and Kent, May 2018

As well as being used by Radlett, from 1975 to 2013 the ground was used by Hertfordshire as the venue for six Minor Counties Championship matches and two MCCA Knockout Trophy matches. Hertfordshire also played two List A cricket matches at the ground in the 1999 NatWest Trophy. It has been used since 2007 by Middlesex for Second XI matches as well as by MCC Young Cricketers for matches against county Second XIs and, as of January 2022, has been the venue for Middlesex List A matches in the Yorkshire Bank 40 and Royal London One Day Cup since 2013. It was used for a single first-class match in June 2019 with Middlesex unable to play at Lord's due to the 2019 Cricket World Cup, and for two of the county's first-class matches during the COVID-19 disrupted 2020 season. The first senior Twenty20 match was played on the ground in 2019

The touring Australians played a one-day match, the first of their tour, against an England Amateur XI on the ground in 1993 and it was the venue for a match between the England Academy Women and Australia Women during the Australian's 2013 tour of England.

In local cricket it is the home ground of Radlett Cricket Club, established in 1884. The club has played in the Hertfordshire Cricket League since 2014, previously playing in the Home Counties Premier Cricket League.

== Records on the ground ==
As of January 2022, a total of three first-class, 11 List A and four Twenty20 senior cricket matches have been held on the ground.

In the grounds first first-class match, Middlesex recorded the highest score on the ground, making 410 all out against Glamorgan in the 2019 County Championship in June 2019. Middlesex's Sam Robson and Paul Stirling both scored centuries, Stirling setting the highest score on the ground after making 138 runs. The highest partnership for any wicket on the ground was the 139 runs put on by Joe Weatherley and Sam Northeast for Hampshire in the Bob Willis Trophy in 2020.

The best innings bowling figures on the ground were set by Middlesex's Tim Murtagh who took 5/34 against Sussex in 2020, beating Steve Finn's figures of 5/75 taken in the ground's first first-class match. These are the only five wicket hauls on the ground.

=== List A records ===
Two of the 11 List A matches held on the ground saw Hertfordshire as the home team, with the remainder with Middlesex as the hosts.

- Highest total: 381/3 by Lancashire against Hertfordshire, 1999 (50 over match)
- Lowest total: 173 by Kent, 2015 (50 over match)
- Highest partnership: 225, 4th wicket by Kafeel Jahangir and AD Griffin, for Hertfordshire against Leicestershire Cricket Board, 1999
- Highest individual score: 134 T Westley, for Essex against Middlesex, 2018
- Best bowling: 5/45, NN Gilchrist for Kent against Middlesex, 2021

=== Twenty20 records ===
A total of four Twenty20 matches have been held on the ground, all with Middlesex as the home team.

- Highest total: 217/7 by Middlesex against Hampshire, 2021
- Highest partnership: 122, 4th wicket by JB Cracknell and JA Simpson, for Middlsex against Hampshire, 2021
- Highest individual score: 91 not out DJ Malan, for Middlsex against Gloucestershire, 2019
- Best bowling: 3/18, ST Finn for Middlesex against Gloucestershire, 2019
