= James Guise =

English cricketer and solicitor

Personal information
- Full name: James Louis Theodore Guise
- Born: 26 August 1910; Calcutta, Bengal Presidency, British India
- Died: 18 June 1996 (aged 85); Lingfield, Surrey, England
- Batting: Right-handed
- Bowling: Slow left-arm orthodox
- Relatives: John Guise, Sr. (father); John Guise, Jr. (brother); Patrick Brett (brother-in-law)

Career statistics
Competition	First-class
Matches	1
Runs scored	18
Batting average	9.00
100s/50s	–/–
Top score	11
Catches/stumpings	–/–
- Source: ESPNcricinfo, 24 February 2019

James Louis Theodore Guise (26 August 1910 – 18 June 1996) was an English first-class cricketer and solicitor.

Guise was born at Calcutta in British India to John Dougal Guise, an East India merchant, and his wife Laura Lilian (nee Buckland). He was educated in England at Winchester College, before going up to Trinity College, Oxford. After graduating from Trinity, Guise became a lawyer. He made one appearance in first-class cricket in 1937 for the Free Foresters against Oxford University at Oxford. Batting twice in the match, Guise was dismissed for 11 runs by Randle Darwall-Smith in the Free Foresters first-innings, while following-on in their second-innings he was dismissed for 7 runs by the same bowler.

He continued to practice law until his retirement in 1969. He was a past president of the Holborn Law Society. Guise died in June 1996 at Lingfield, Surrey. His brother, John Jr., was also a first-class cricketer.

His father, John Dougal Guise, had also played at least two first-class matches, for Gentlemen of India against Oxford Authentics in Delhi in 1902-03, and for MC Bird’s XI against Maharajah of Cooch-Behar’s XI, at Eden Gardens, Calcutta, in 1918-19.
