= Hertfordshire Cricket League =

ECB Premier League

Hertfordshire Premier Cricket League
- Countries: England
- Administrator: Hertfordshire Cricket Limited
- Format: mixture of Limited Overs and Timed fixtures
- First edition: 1974
- Tournament format: League
- Number of teams: 290 teams over 29 Divisions (incl Premiership Divisions)
- Current champion: Totteridge Millhillians CC
- Most successful: Radlett CC (8 titles)
- Website: https://www.HertsPremierCL.co.uk/

Hertfordshire Premier Cricket League is a league cricket competition based in the county of Hertfordshire, England. Since 2015 it has been a designated ECB Premier League, the highest level of recreational club cricket in England and Wales.

== History ==
League cricket in Hertfordshire began in 1968 with the forming of the Hertfordshire Cricket Competition. In 1974 the leading clubs broke away from the Competition and formed the Hertfordshire Cricket League, and then in 1994 the two tournaments once again merged under the name Hertfordshire Cricket League.

When the system of ECB Premier Leagues was introduced, it was decided that the Hertfordshire Cricket League together with the Cherwell Cricket League and Thames Valley Cricket League should become feeders to a newly formed Home Counties Premier Cricket League. Accordingly, between 2000 and 2013 the top Hertfordshire clubs played in that league and not in the Hertfordshire Cricket League.

Hertfordshire's relationship with the Home Counties Premier Cricket League was always uneasy, and in autumn 2013 the Hertfordshire clubs all resigned from the Home Counties Premier Cricket League (with the exception of Tring Park, who had not played in the Hertfordshire Cricket League since 1981, when they switched to the Thames Valley Cricket League). The Hertfordshire clubs then returned to the Hertfordshire Cricket League, which was awarded ECB Premier League status in time for the 2015 season.

Until 2022, the league used a format where the championship was not decided on league performance alone; the top four in the league table then played semi finals and a final to decide the champions. This format was discontinued for the 2023 season.

Although most of the league's member clubs are located within the borders of the county, teams from North London and Bedfordshire are also members, and in the past there have been member clubs from Buckinghamshire and Essex as well. The league is sponsored by The Saracens Foundation.

== Winners ==
=== Hertfordshire Cricket Competition 1968 to 1973 ===
- League Champions 1968–1973
  Year	Club
  1968	Tring Park
  1969	Berkhamsted
  1970	Royston
  1971	Berkhamsted
  1972	Bishop's Stortford
  1973	Old Finchleians

=== Hertfordshire Cricket League 1974 to 1999 ===
- League Champions 1974–1986
  Year	Club
  1974	Berkhamsted
  1975	Hertford
  1976	Hertford
  1977	Hertford
  1978	Hertford
  1979	Hertford
  1980	Watford Town
  1981	Bishop's Stortford
  1982	Watford Town
  1983	Cheshunt
  1984	Sawbridgeworth
  1985	Luton Town
  1986	Bishop's Stortford
- League Champions 1987–1999
  Year	Club
  1987	Bishop's Stortford
  1988	Bishop's Stortford
  1989	Radlett
  1990	North Mymms
  1991	Radlett
  1992	North Mymms
  1993	Luton Town
  1994	St Albans
  1995	Radlett
  1996	Radlett
  1997	Radlett
  1998	Langleybury
  1999	Hemel Hempstead Town

Between 2000 and 2013 the leading Hertfordshire clubs played in the Home Counties Premier Cricket League.

=== Hertfordshire Cricket League from 2014 ===
- League Champions 2014–Present
  Year	Club
  2014	Radlett
  2015	Radlett
  2016	Welwyn Garden City
  2017	Welwyn Garden City
  2018	Welwyn Garden City
  2019	Potters Bar
  2020	no competition
  2021	Hertford
  2022	Radlett
  2023	Potters Bar
  2024	Harpenden
  2025	Harpenden
  2026	Totteridge Millhillians

== Performance by season from 2015 ==
Key
Gold	Champions
Blue	Left League
Red	Relegated

Performance by season, from 2015
Club	2015	2016	2017	2018	2019	2021	2022	2023	2024	2025	2026
Bishop's Stortford	6	3	7	8	10		7	4	8	8	5
Botany Bay		9									
Broxbourne											7
Flitwick										5	6
Harpenden	3	4	5	9	6	3	3	2	1	1	2
Hemel Hempstead Town	10										
Hertford	5	5	9	6	7	1	9	6	7	7	10
Hoddesdon						6	10				
Letchworth Garden City	9		8	10							
Luton Town and Indians			10		9						
North Mymms	2	7	3	3	5	7	5	7	3	9	
Old Owens								8	10		9
Potters Bar	8	8	6	4	1	8	2	1	2	3	4
Radlett	1	2	4	5	2	4	1	3	5	6	8
Reed						10					
Sawbridgeworth	7	10									
Shenley Village									9		
Totteridge Millhillians		6	2	2	4	2	4	5	4	2	1
Welwyn Garden City	4	1	1	1	3	5	8	10		10	
West Herts				7	8	9	6	9	6	4	3
References											
