= Chesham Cricket Club =

English cricket team

Chesham
- League: Thames Valley Cricket League, Chess Valley Cricket League
- Association: English Cricket Board, Buckinghamshire Cricket Board

Personnel
- Captain: Matthew Rance
- Chairman: Jonathan Royals

Team information
- City: Chesham, United Kingdom
- Founded: 1848
- Home ground: The Meadow, Chesham
- Official website: cheshamcc.co.uk

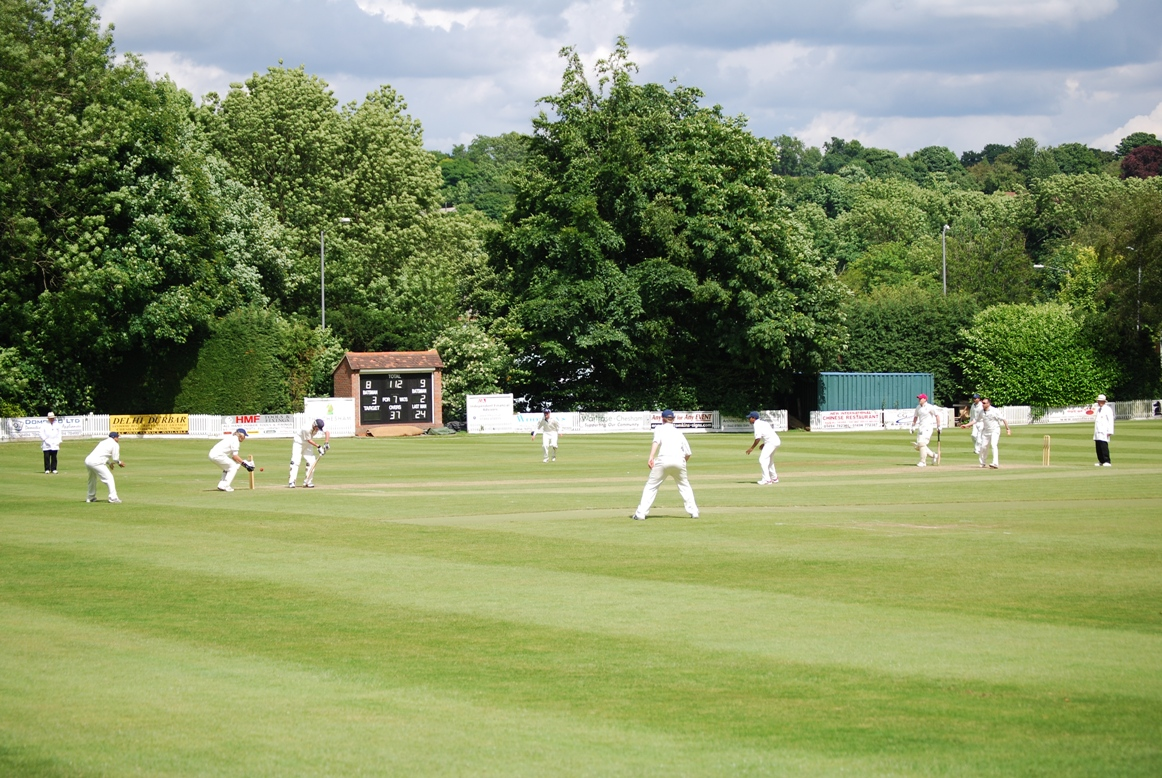
A 1st XI match in progress, from the 2008 season

Chesham Cricket Club is a cricket club, based in Chesham, Buckinghamshire (Bucks), England. The first team play in division two of the Home Counties Premier Cricket League, with the 2nd, 3rd and 4th elevens playing in divisions 3,4 and 8 respectively in the Thames Valley Cricket League. Chesham also runs a women's side, who play in the Bucks Women's League, and two Sunday teams, who participate in the Chess Valley Cricket League, both sides were promoted in 2009, while the first team were again promoted in 2010, to Division 1, and the seconds consolidated their position in Division 6. The club also has a thriving junior section with hundreds of players.

== 2010 season ==
2010 was a mixed season for the club. Under club stalwart Dave Porter, the 1st team attempted to win promotion back to Division 1, however occasional erratic form and an excellent Henley side ended Chesham's hopes, and were forced to settle for 2nd place, despite stellar bowling performances from Dave Porter and Peter Ongondo. However, signs of future promise were there as 8 of the team are under 21, and all came through the Chesham junior section.

== 2011 season ==
2011 could not have started in a worse fashion for the club as the club's pavilion was burned down in an arson attack on 1 April. The club used portacabins for changing rooms during the season. Despite this, cricket continued to be played all summer and on field the club looked very strong. The 1st XI missed out on promotion to Division 1 by just 4 points, courtesy of losing the toss in the final game of the year at Falkland and being put in the field first, capping the number of points on offer to the side at 20, as opposed to the maximum 25. The 2nd XI started brightly but faded fast and finished mid-table while the 3rd XI won promotion to Division 5 in the shock of the year. Sunday cricket continued to thrive at Chesham with mixed on field results while the Women's XI won their league unbeaten. The club's primary focus, however, is to rebuild the pavilion and this requires raising £200,000 in a tough economic climate.
