= London Road, High Wycombe =

Cricket ground in England

Coordinates: 51.6245°N 0.7352°W

London Road
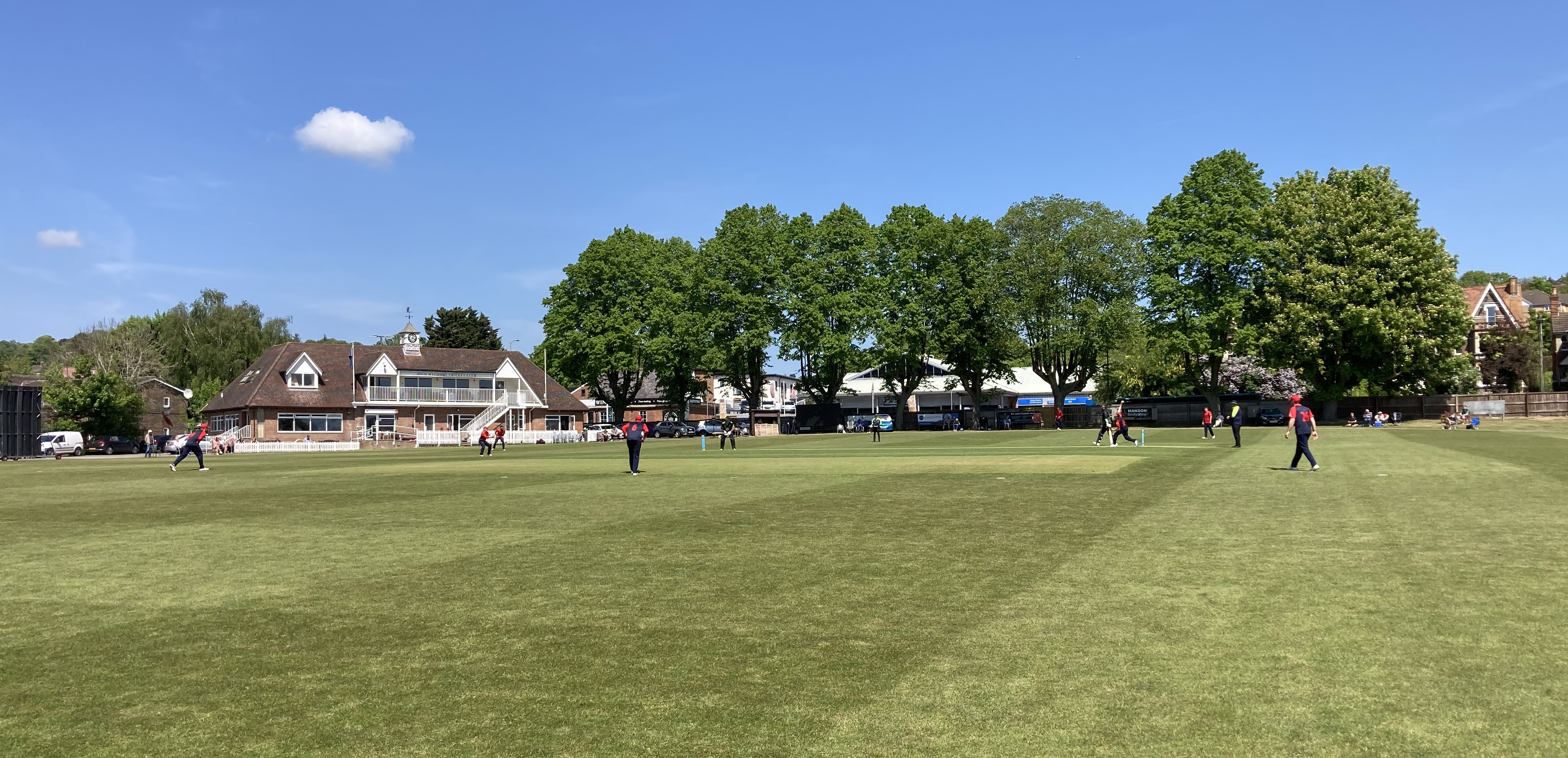
- Interactive map of London Road

Ground information
- Location: High Wycombe, Buckinghamshire
- Country: England
- Establishment: 1891 (first recorded match)

Team information
Buckinghamshire	(1895-present)
Minor Counties South	(1979)
- As of 22 August 2010; Source: Ground profile

London Road is a cricket ground in High Wycombe, Buckinghamshire. The first recorded match on the ground was in 1891, when High Wycombe played the House of Commons. The first Minor Counties Championship match held on the ground came in 1895 when Buckinghamshire played Bedfordshire. From 1895 to 2001 the ground has hosted 115 Minor Counties Championship matches, the last of which saw Buckinghamshire play Northumberland. Buckinghamshire returned to the ground in 2010 to play the first MCCA Knockout Trophy match held at the ground, against Wiltshire.

The ground has also held List-A matches. The first List-A match held on the ground was between Buckinghamshire and Bedfordshire in the 1970 Gillette Cup. A Minor Counties South team played Worcestershire in the 1979 Benson and Hedges Cup at London Road. The ground held 2 further List-A matches, the last of which saw Buckinghamshire play Somerset in the 1987 NatWest Trophy.

In local domestic cricket, the ground is the home venue of High Wycombe Cricket Club who play in the Home Counties Premier Cricket League.
