= Uxbridge Cricket Club Ground =

Cricket ground in Uxbridge, London

Coordinates: 51.5519°N 0.4682°W

Uxbridge Cricket Ground
- Uxbridge
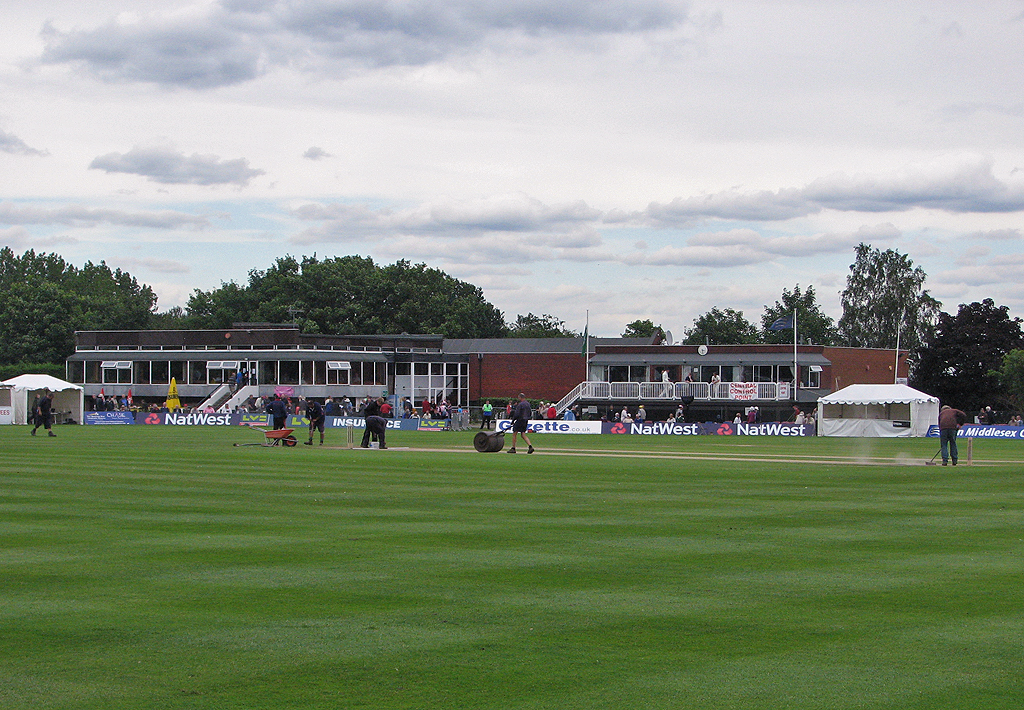
- The clubhouse and ground during a match in 2012

Ground information
- Location: Uxbridge, London
- Establishment: 1971
- Capacity: 6,000
- Owner: Uxbridge Cricket Club (1971-present)
- Tenants: Uxbridge Cricket Club (1971-present); Middlesex County Cricket Club (1980-1998, 2003, 2005-present)
- End names
- Chichester Pavilion End; Town End

Team information
Uxbridge Cricket Club	(1971 - present)
Middlesex	(1980-1998, 2003, 2005-present)

Uxbridge Cricket Ground is a cricket ground in Uxbridge, London, England.

== Teams using the ground ==
=== Middlesex ===
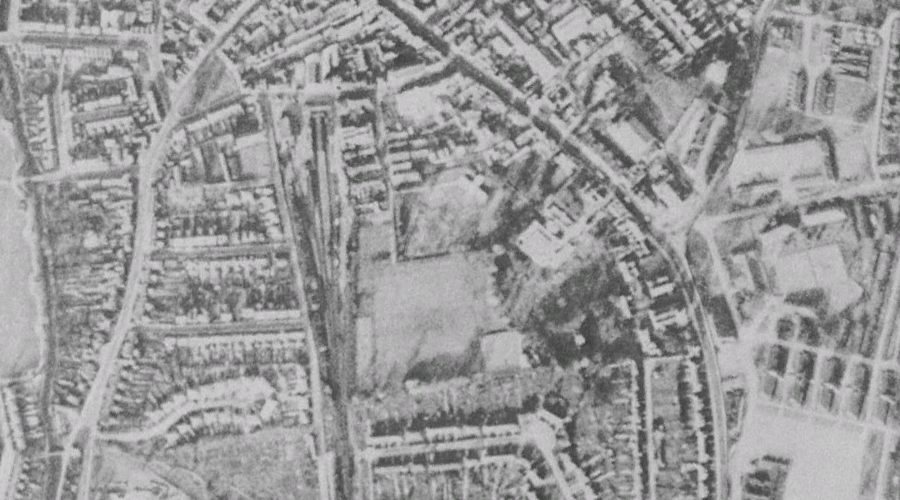
The Cricketfield Road ground in 1945

Middlesex County Cricket Club first used the ground competitively in 1980 on their way on to winning the County Championship in a match against Derbyshire. Middlesex won by 9 wickets, with Vintcent van der Bijl taking 10 wickets in the match. However Middlesex had used the ground once before when they played the West Indies cricket team in a friendly one day match, just before the 1979 World Cup. The ground also played host to a Pakistan v Zimbabwe warm up match before the 1983 World Cup. The County's second eleven first used the ground in 1973. Middlesex played at the ground until 1998. The club returned with their second eleven in 2002 and followed by the first team in 2003, when they played a Twenty Twenty game against Hampshire. The first team didn't return until 2005 this time against Kent in another Twenty Twenty game. They have used the ground each year since. In 2006 Pakistan were due to play Middlesex in a one-day game ahead of the one day series with England. Unfortunately the match had to be abandoned without a ball being bowled due to overnight rain leaving the ground very wet.

=== Marylebone ===
Marylebone Cricket Club have also used the ground, to play matches against counties second eleven sides. Now they field a team of young cricketers against the second elevens. They first used the ground in 1995, but since 2000 have used it more frequently.
