= Slough Cricket Club =

Cricket club based in Berkshire, England

Coordinates: 51°29′47″N 0°34′25″W

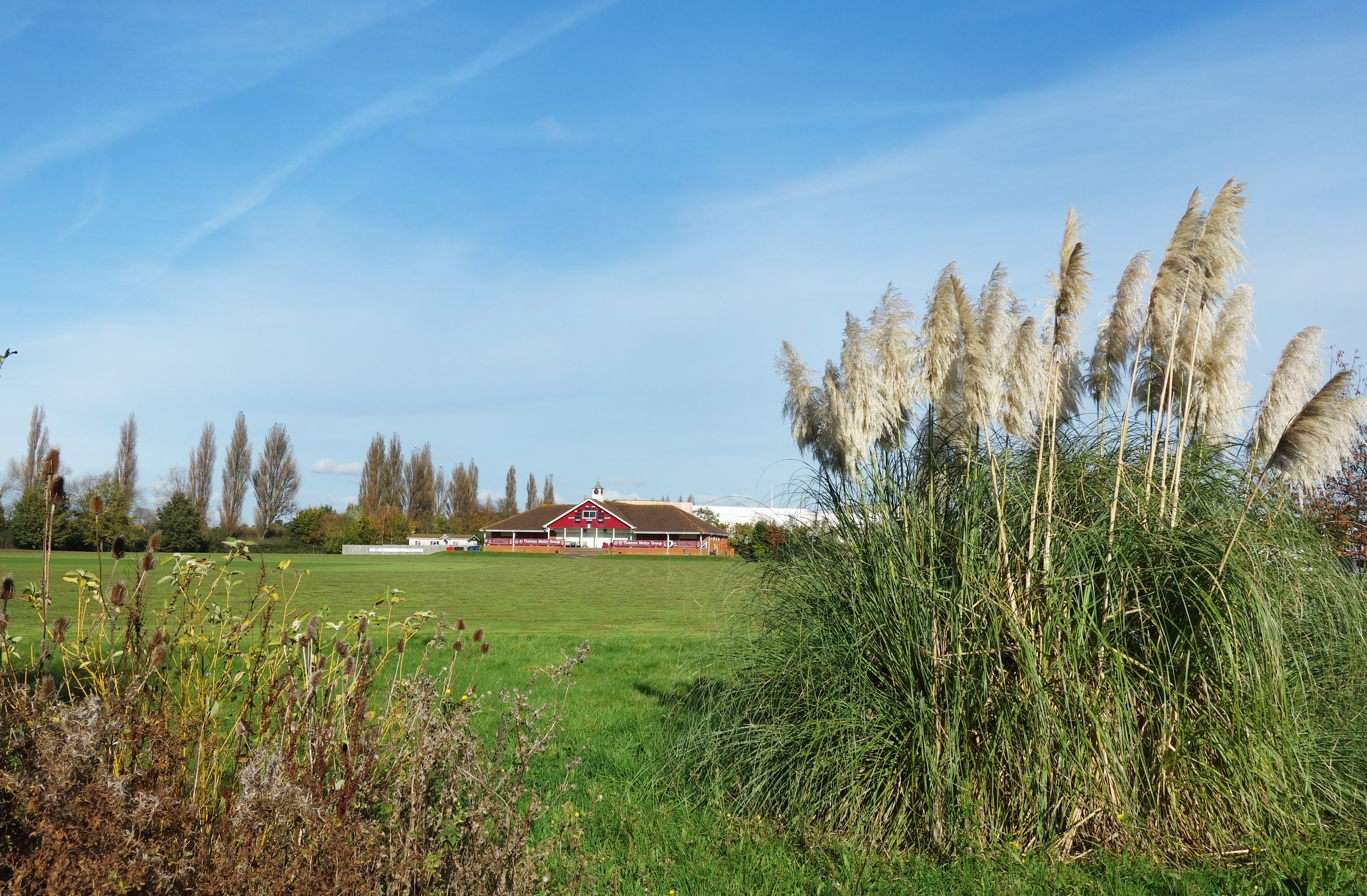
- Slough Cricket Club (2017)
- League: Home Counties Premier Cricket League

Personnel
- Coach: Wilson Gumbs
- Chairman: Goutham Shrikrishna

Team information
- Colors: Gold Maroon
- Founded: 1849
- Home ground: Upton Court Road, Slough

History
- No. of titles: 1
- HCPCL Div 1 wins: 2006
- HCPCL T20 Cup wins: 2021
- Official website: www.sloughcc.co.uk

Slough Cricket Club is a cricket club based in Berkshire, in southern England. Slough Cricket Club has been at the forefront of cricket in the Thames Valley since it moved to Chalvey Road in 1899. It joined the Thames Valley League on its inception in 1972 and has remained in the top division ever since. Their first team play in Division Two of the Home Counties Premier Cricket League, with the 2nd, 3rd, 4th, 5th and 6th elevens playing in divisions 1,3,5,7 and 9 respectively in the Thames Valley Cricket League, a Sunday eleven team who participate in the South East Shires Cricket League, and a Junior Section, who play in the Berkshire Youth Cricket League.

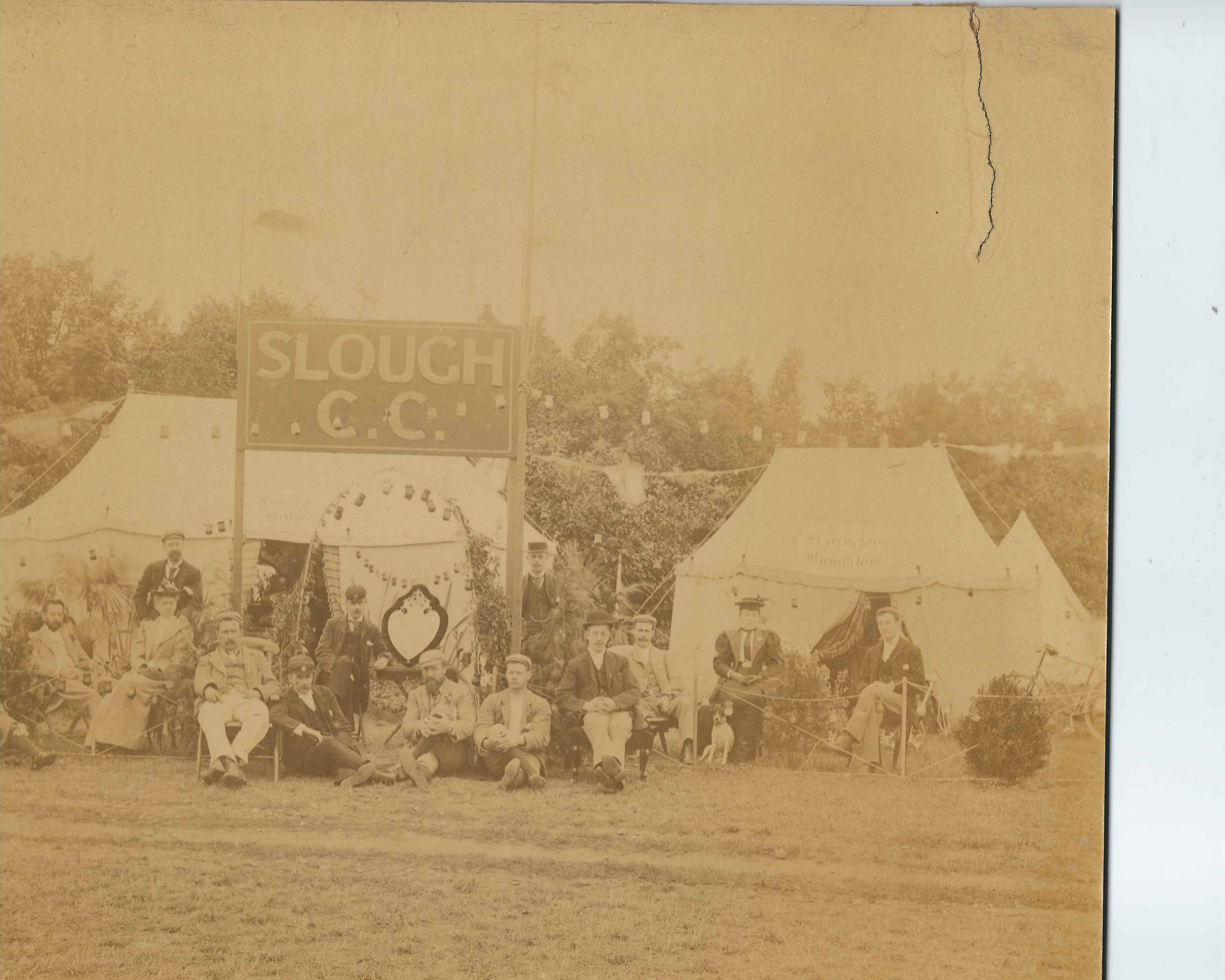
Slough Cricket Club, Chalvey Road Cricket Ground - 1892.

== Club history ==
The club was founded in 1849.The club was initially based in Chalvey Road East since its formation but moved a mile to its present location Upton Court Park ground from the 2000 season.

Slough Cricket Club has produced many fine players over the years, one of which is Ian Gould. Ian played for Middlesex and captained Sussex after learning his trade at Slough and went on to represent England in the one-day game. He briefly took on the role of chairman following the retirement of Eddie Thompson in 2000. Eddie stood down after 13 years in the job and was the man responsible for overseeing the construction of the new ground. The current chairman, Tony Ellis, has returned to the role having served previously for a number of years and brings with him some much-needed discipline and direction following the departure of Ian Gould at the end of the 2001 season.

== Club Honours ==
League Championships
Year	League	Division
2006	Home Counties Premier Cricket League	Division 1
2021	Home Counties Premier Cricket League	Division 2
2012	Home Counties Premier Cricket League	Division 2(W)
2022	Thames Valley Cricket League	Division 6B
2022	Thames Valley Cricket League	Division 9B
2017	Thames Valley Cricket League	Division 2B
2013	Thames Valley Cricket League	Division 3A
2005	Thames Valley Cricket League	Division 3A
2005	Thames Valley Cricket League	Division 4B

Cup wins
Year	Cup
2021	Home Counties Premier Cricket League; T20 Cup
2018	Home Counties Premier Cricket League; T20 Cup
2012	Home Counties Premier Cricket League; T20 Cup

== Teams ==
Slough Cricket Club has 7 senior and 23 juniors teams (U9/U11/U13/U15/U17/U19/Girl's U11/Girls U13).

Team	Category	Captain/Manager
1st XI	Senior	Nadeem Syed
2nd XI	Senior	Goutham Shrikrishna
3rd XI	Senior	Puneet Chopra
4th XI	Senior	Sohaib Pirzada
5th XI	Senior	Amit Wagh
6th XI	Senior	Sunil Bindra
Sunday 1st XI	Senior	Surender Pande
Sunday 2nd XI	Senior	Joshua Donbosco
Women's 1st XI	Senior	Raabia Akhter
Women's 2nd XI	Senior	Richa Bhalla
Women's Soft ball	Senior	Raabia Akhter
U19s	Colts	Asif Iqbal
U17s	Colts	Asif Iqbal
U15s (Tiger, Panther, Lion)	Colts	Wilson Gumbs
U13s (Tiger, Panther, Lion)	Colts	Wilson Gumbs
Girl's U13	Colts	Raabia Akhter
U11s (Tiger, Panther, Lion)	Colts	Asif Iqbal
Girl's U11	Colts	Raabia Akhter
U9s (Tiger, Panther, Lion, Puma)	Colts	Asif Iqbal

== Notable members ==
- Ian Gould - England international and ICC international umpire
- Chris Lewis - England international
- Toby Radford - West Indies batting coach
- Mark Gillespie - New Zealand international
- Chris Pringle - New Zealand international
- Saif Zaib - Northamptonshire County Cricket Club player
- Kamran Younis - Pakistan International

== All Stars Cricket & Dynamos Cricket ==
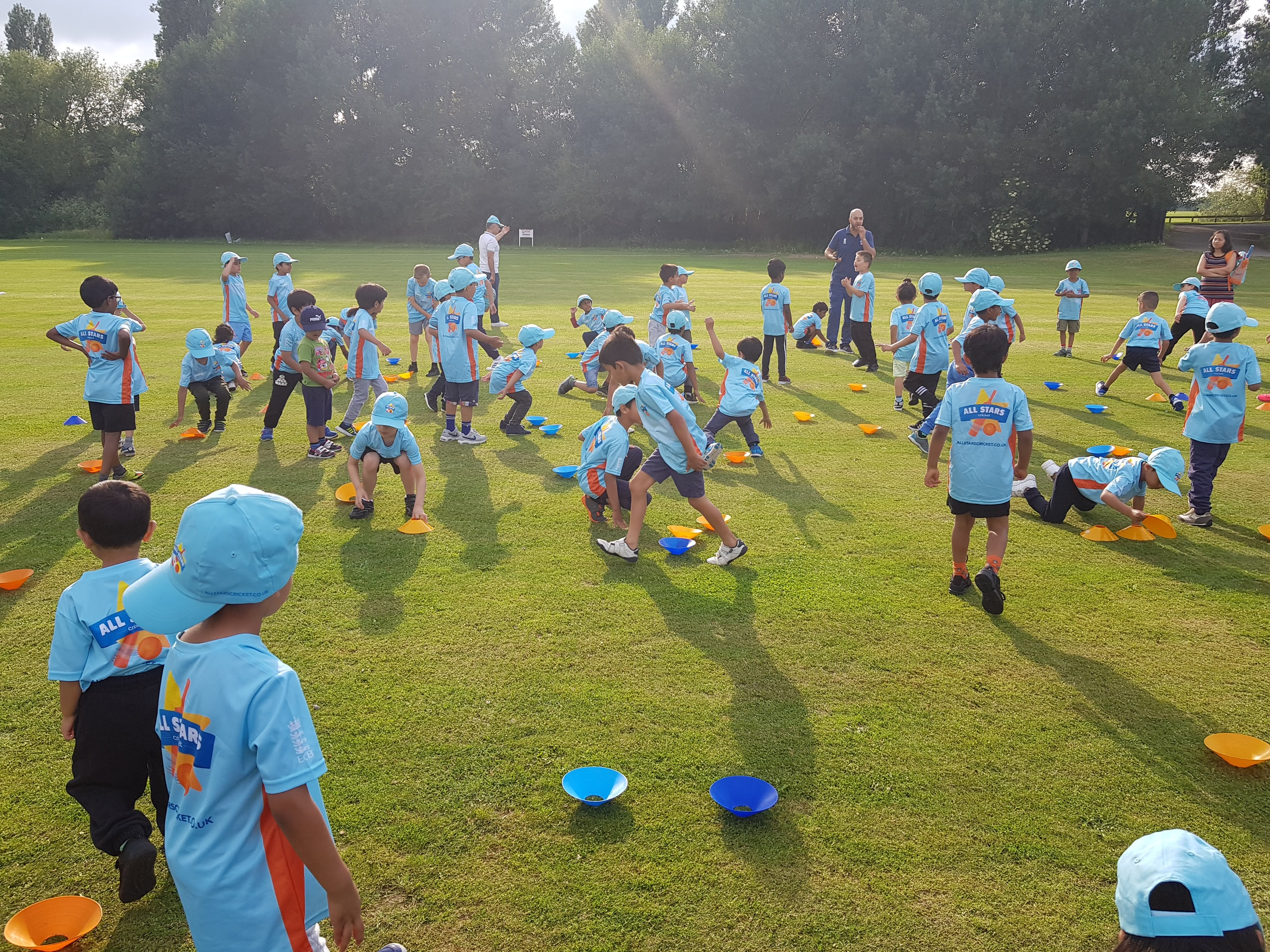
All Stars Cricket at Slough Cricket Club

Slough Cricket Club is an approved center for All Stars Cricket. It is an initiative from the England and Wales Cricket Board aimed at providing children aged five to eight with a first experience in Cricket. There are eight one-hour sessions, held over eight weeks during summer.
