= Uxbridge Cricket Club =

Cricket club in Uxbridge, England

Coordinates: 51°33′09.70″N 0°28′10.18″W

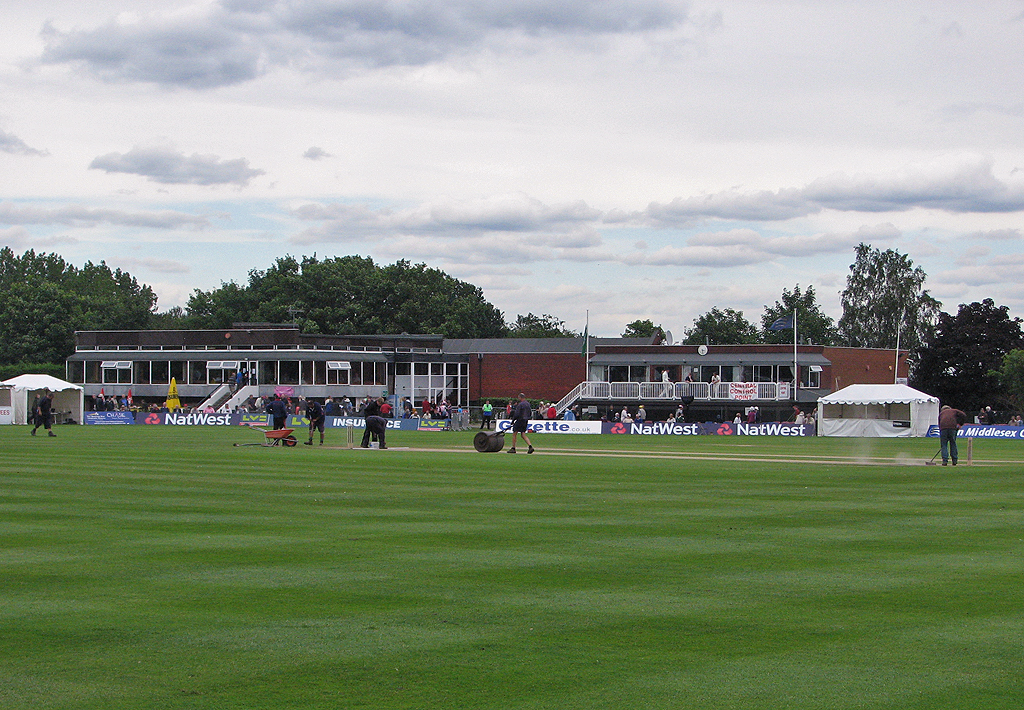

Personnel
- Captain: (England) Leo Fernandes

Team information
- Founded: 1789
- Home ground: Uxbridge Cricket Club Ground
- Official website: Uxbridge Cricket Club

Uxbridge Cricket Club is a cricket club based in Uxbridge, London, England. Uxbridge CC is a member of the Thames Valley Cricket League which feeds into the Home Counties League a designated ECB Premier League. The first team are currently in Division One.

== History ==
There are records of Cricket being played in the Uxbridge area as far back as 1735. The official founding date of Uxbridge Cricket Club is 1789.

The first games were played on the Uxbridge Moor area of the town, later moving to Uxbridge Common. In 1858 the club moved again, to a field behind the Eastern end of Uxbridge High Street, and remained there until 1970 when the redevelopment of the town centre obliged the club to seek a new home. The club moved to the present site, opposite Uxbridge Common.

For a number of years Middlesex County Cricket Club played County Championship and List-A matches at the Uxbridge Cricket Club Ground. In recent years the County team has moved out of Uxbridge due to the pitch being deemed too batsmen friendly. However, the county has now returned to Uxbridge to play Twenty20 matches from 2003 and has played the odd County game there during 2010.

The high points of the club have been the winning of the Thames Valley Cricket League in 1982 followed by reaching the Final of the Evening Standard Challenge Trophy in 2000. Since 1989, Uxbridge has been playing in the Middlesex County Cricket League, the foremost league in the county.

== Other sports ==
The club offers a number of other sports including bowls, with Uxbridge Bowls Club being founded in 1908. The club has an adjoining rugby club. Uxbridge RFC was formed from two clubs, namely Borderers RFC & Old Creightonians in 1947. In 1991 Uxbridge RFC merged with Uxbridge Cricket Club. The club also has squash and tennis sections.
