= Patrick Brett =

English cricketer (1910–1982)

Personal information
- Full name: Patrick John Brett
- Born: 18 April 1910; Johannesburg, Transvaal, South Africa
- Died: 9 December 1982 (aged 72); Hook Heath, Surrey, England
- Batting: Right-handed
- Bowling: Right-arm medium-fast
- Relatives: James Guise (brother-in-law)

Domestic team information
- Years: Team
- 1929: Oxford University

Career statistics
Competition	First-class
Matches	8
Runs scored	490
Batting average	40.83
100s/50s	1/3
Top score	106
Balls bowled	513
Wickets	4
Bowling average	60.50
5 wickets in innings	–
10 wickets in match	–
Best bowling	2/32
Catches/stumpings	2/–
- Source: Cricinfo, 2 February 2020

Patrick John Brett (18 April 1910 – 9 December 1982) was an English first-class cricketer.

Brett was born in South Africa at Johannesburg in April 1910. He was educated in England at Winchester College, before going up to Trinity College, Oxford. While studying at Oxford, he played first-class cricket on eight occasions for Oxford University in 1929. He was used largely by Oxford as an opening bowler, with his right-arm medium-fast capable of swinging both ways and coming off the pitch quickly. It was however as a batsman that Brett impressed, scoring 490 runs in his eight matches at an average of 40.83. He made one century score, with 106 against H. D. G. Leveson Gower's XI at Eastbourne. Featuring in a strong Oxford side that contained the likes of Ian Akers-Douglas, Neville Ford and the Nawab of Pataudi, his place was in constant doubt until his century seemingly cemented his place in the Oxford side for 1930. However, he was seriously injured in a car accident before the 1930 season and played no further first-class cricket. Brett died in December 1982 at Hook Heath, Surrey. His brother-in-law, James Guise, was also a first-class cricketer.
