= Douglas Cavener =

American biologist

- Alma mater: Cornell University; University of Georgia; Brown University
- Awards: Theodosius Dobzhansky Prize (1981); Fellow of the American Association for the Advancement of Science (2014)
- Academic career
- Institutions: Vanderbilt University (1982–2000); Pennsylvania State University (2000–)

Douglas R. Cavener is an American biologist, a Professor of Biology and the former Verne M. Willaman Dean Professor of Science at Eberly College of Science, Pennsylvania State University, and also a published author, being widely cited and widely held in libraries.

== Awards and honors ==
- 1981 Theodosius Dobzhansky Prize
- 2014 Fellow of the American Association for the Advancement of Science

== Select publications ==
- D R Cavener (February 25, 1987). "Comparison of the consensus sequence flanking translational start sites in Drosophila and vertebrates". Nucleic Acids Research. 15 (4): 1353–61. doi:10.1093/NAR/15.4.1353. ISSN 0305-1048. PMC 340553. PMID 3822832. Wikidata Q24629553.
- Francesca Fallarino; Ursula Grohmann; Sylvaine You; et al. (June 1, 2006). "The combined effects of tryptophan starvation and tryptophan catabolites down-regulate T cell receptor zeta-chain and induce a regulatory phenotype in naive T cells". Journal of Immunology. 176 (11): 6752–6761. doi:10.4049/JIMMUNOL.176.11.6752. ISSN 0022-1767. PMID 16709834. Wikidata Q56902123.
- Douglas R. Cavener; Stuart C. Ray (June 1, 1991). "Eukaryotic start and stop translation sites". Nucleic Acids Research. 19 (12): 3185–3192. doi:10.1093/NAR/19.12.3185. ISSN 0305-1048. PMC 328309. PMID 1905801. Wikidata Q40504517.
