= Cliff Cavener =

English cricketer

Cliff Cavener (born 30 April 1967) is a former an English cricketer. He was a right-handed batsman and right-arm medium-pace bowler who played for Hertfordshire. He was born in Edmonton.

Cavener, who made his Minor Counties Championship debut in 1988, made his List A debut in the NatWest Trophy of 1993, against Gloucestershire. From the lower-middle order, he scored a single run, and took bowling figures of 1-56.

Having played regularly in the Minor Counties Championship in 1994 and 1995, Cavener took five seasons out from the game. Cavener made his second and final List A appearance in August 2001, scoring two runs, though this was his final appearance for Hertfordshire in any form of cricket.

Cavener joined Hertford in 2002 and as of 2008, still represents the team in the ECB National Club Cricket Championship.
