= Thames Valley Cricket League =

Recreational cricket league in southern England

The Thames Valley Cricket League (TVCL), established in 1972, is a recreational cricket league based to the west of London, with 299 teams from 107 clubs drawn from Berkshire, Buckinghamshire, Hampshire, Hertfordshire, Middlesex, Oxfordshire and Surrey. The league, described by Berkshire Cricket as "the major league cricket competition for cricket clubs in Berkshire and surrounding counties", has become a feeder league for the Home Counties Premier Cricket League since the creation of the Premier League in 2000. The league is part of the ECB Premier League structure, with the Division 1 champion eligible for promotion to the Home Counties Premier League.

== History ==
The Thames Valley Cricket League was established in 1972. The league grew to become the principal recreational cricket competition in the region, covering clubs across seven counties to the west of London.

In 2024, the league expanded significantly through a merger with the Berkshire Cricket League, the Chilterns Cricket League, and three clubs from the Mid-Bucks League. Member clubs approved the amalgamation proposal, and the Berkshire and Chilterns Leagues voted to dissolve their competitions, with the merged structure taking effect for the 2025 season. Over the same period, Berkshire Cricket noted that "the TVCL has merged with other local leagues to create a structure that ensures that cricket in the Thames Valley will continue to grow".

During the COVID-19 pandemic, the league took early action to support member clubs facing financial hardship, using its bank surplus to waive membership fees and subsidise the cost of match balls.

== Format ==
=== Divisional structure ===
The league operates a pyramid structure with two singular divisions (Division 1 and Division 1B) at the top, and below that multiple parallel divisions (e.g. Divisions 2A and 2B, then 3A, 3B, 3C, etc.) down to Division 10. Each division contains a maximum of ten teams, playing every other team home and away over 18 rounds (9 home and 9 away). The Division 1 champion is eligible for promotion to the Home Counties Premier Cricket League.

=== Match formats ===
The season uses two different match formats. "Traditional" matches are played in Rounds 6 to 14 (Divisions 1 to 4 only), while "Win/Lose" matches are played in the remaining rounds across all divisions.

==== Traditional matches (Divisions 1–4) ====
Traditional matches have a maximum duration of 100 overs. The team batting first may occupy up to 52 overs; the team batting second receives the balance. A bowler may bowl a maximum of 15 overs. Matches in Divisions 1 and 2 start at 12:00pm; Divisions 3 and 4 start at 12:30pm. A red ball is used. Teams play in white clothing.

==== Win/Lose matches ====
Win/Lose matches are limited-overs contests with no declarations permitted. The maximum overs per innings vary by division: 50 overs in Divisions 1 and 2, 45 overs in Divisions 3 to 7, and 40 overs in Divisions 8 and below. A minimum of 20 overs per innings is required for a result; otherwise the match is abandoned. Free hits apply after every no-ball. The Duckworth–Lewis–Stern method is used in rain-affected matches.

In Divisions 1 and 2, matches are played with a pink ball in coloured clothing. Three powerplay phases apply (10/30/10 overs in a 50-over innings), restricting the number of fielders outside the 30-yard ring. No-balls incur a two-run penalty and bowlers are limited to one bouncer per over (over shoulder height).

In Divisions 3 and below, a red ball and white clothing are used. In Divisions 3 to 7, a maximum of five fielders may be stationed outside the 30-yard ring throughout the innings. No-balls incur the standard one-run penalty.

=== Points ===
Match points
Result	Traditional	Win/Lose
Win	26	22
Tie	16	14
Draw, Loss or Abandoned (2nd innings)	3 (+ bonus pts)	0 (+ bonus pts for loss)
Abandoned (1st innings) or Cancelled	8	7

Bonus points are available in matches that result in a draw, loss or abandonment in the second innings (Traditional) or a loss (Win/Lose). Batting bonus points are awarded on a sliding scale from 1 point (for scoring 100 runs) to 5 points (for 200 or more). In the second innings, additional batting bonus points are awarded based on the percentage of the first-innings score achieved, from 1 point (75%) to 5 points (95%). Bowling bonus points range from 1 point (for two wickets) to 8 points (for bowling the opposition out) in the first innings, and up to 5 points in the second innings.

In Divisions 3 and below, each team that provides a qualified League Registered Umpire receives 1 bonus point per match.

== Division 1 winners ==
Year	Division 1 champions
2025	Ickenham Cricket Club
2024	Falkland CC
2023	Stoke Green Cricket Club
2022	Gerrards Cross Cricket Club
2021	Stoke Green Cricket Club
2020	Cove Cricket Club
2019	Wargrave Cricket Club
2018	Cookham Dean Cricket Club
2017	Wokingham Cricket Club
2016	Chesham Cricket Club
2015	Cookham Dean Cricket Club
2014	Kew Cricket Club
2013	Amersham Cricket Club
2012	Reading Cricket Club
2011	Cove Cricket Club
2010	Burnham Cricket Club
2009	Harefield Cricket Club
2008	Beaconsfield Cricket Club
2007	Thatcham Town Cricket Club
2006	Kew Cricket Club
2005	Wokingham Cricket Club
2004	North Maidenhead Cricket Club
2003	NPL Teddington Cricket Club
2002	Gerrards Cross Cricket Club
2001	Farnham Royal Cricket Club
2000	Burnham Cricket Club
1999	High Wycombe Cricket Club
1998	Hounslow Cricket Club
1997	Beaconsfield Cricket Club
1996	Basingstoke Cricket Club
1995	Ickenham Cricket Club
1994	Finchampstead Cricket Club
1993	Beaconsfield Cricket Club
1992	Reading Cricket Club
1991	Beaconsfield Cricket Club
1990	Boyne Hill Cricket Club
1989	Basingstoke Cricket Club
1988	Basingstoke Cricket Club
1987	High Wycombe Cricket Club
1986	Maidenhead & Bray Cricket Club
1985	Basingstoke Cricket Club
1984	Beaconsfield Cricket Club
1983	Beaconsfield Cricket Club
1982	Uxbridge Cricket Club
1981	Reading Cricket Club
1980	Ickenham Cricket Club
1979	Hounslow Cricket Club
1978	High Wycombe Cricket Club
1977	Reading Cricket Club
1976	Maidenhead & Bray Cricket Club
1975	Reading Cricket Club
1974	Reading Cricket Club
1973	Gerrards Cross Cricket Club
1972	Basingstoke Cricket Club

== Member clubs ==
Club
Aldershot Cricket Club
Amersham Cricket Club
Ballinger Waggoners Cricket Club
Barnes Cricket Club
Beaconsfield Cricket Club
Binfield Cricket Club
Boyne Hill Cricket Club
Bracknell United Cricket Club
Bradfield Cricket Club
Braywood Cricket Club
Burnham Cricket Club
Bushy Park Cricket Club
Calcot Cricket Club
Chalfont St Giles Cricket Club
Chalfont St Peter Cricket Club
Checkendon Cricket Club
Chenies & Latimer Cricket Club
Chesham Cricket Club
Cookham Dean Cricket Club
Cove Cricket Club
Crowthorne & Crown Wood Cricket Club
Datchet Cricket Club
Denham Cricket Club
Downley Cricket Club
Earley Cricket Club
Eastcote Cricket Club
Emmbrook and Bearwood Cricket Club
Eversley Cricket Club
Falkland Cricket Club
Farley Hill Cricket Club
Farnham Common Cricket Club
Farnham Royal Cricket Club
Finchampstead Cricket Club
Fleet Cricket Club
Fulmer Cricket Club
Gerrards Cross Cricket Club
Goring on Thames Cricket Club
Great Hampden Cricket Club
Great Kingshill Cricket Club
Hampstead Norreys Cricket Club
Harefield Cricket Club
Harpsden Cricket Club
Hawridge & Cholesbury Cricket Club
Hayes Cricket Club
Henley Cricket Club
High Wycombe Cricket Club
Hillingdon Manor Cricket Club
Holmer Green Cricket Club
Holyport Cricket Club
Hounslow & Whitton Cricket Club
Hurley Cricket Club
Hurst Rangers Cricket Club
Ickenham Cricket Club
Kew Cricket Club
Kidmore End Cricket Club
Knotty Green Cricket Club
Knowl Hill Cricket Club
Lacey Green Cricket Club
Little Marlow Cricket Club
Littlewick Green Cricket Club
Maidenhead & Bray Cricket Club
Maidenhead Royals Cricket Club
Marlow Cricket Club
Monks Risborough Cricket Club
Mortimer & West End Cricket Club
Newbury Cricket Club
Old Merchant Taylors Cricket Club
Penn & Tylers Green Cricket Club
Peppard Stoke Row Cricket Club
Phoenix Cricket Club
Pinkneys Green Cricket Club
Princes Risborough Cricket Club
Purley on Thames Cricket Club
Reading Cricket Club
Reading Lions Cricket Club
Royal Ascot Cricket Club
Ruislip Cricket Club
Ruislip Victoria Cricket Club
Sandhurst Cricket Club
Shinfield Cricket Club
Silchester Cricket Club
Slough Cricket Club
Sonning Cricket Club
Stoke Green Cricket Club
Stratfield Turgis/Hartley Wespall Cricket Club
Sulhamstead & Ufton Cricket Club
Taplow Cricket Club
Thatcham Town Cricket Club
The Lee Cricket Club
Theale and Tilehurst Cricket Club
Tring Park Cricket Club
Twyford and Ruscombe Cricket Club
Uxbridge Cricket Club
Waltham St Lawrence Cricket Club
Warfield Cricket Club
Wargrave Cricket Club
Welford Park Cricket Club
Wendover Cricket Club
West Reading Cricket Club
White Waltham Cricket Club
Widmer End St Margarets Cricket Club
Winchmore Hill Cricket Club
Windsor Cricket Club
Wokingham Cricket Club
Wooburn Narkovians Cricket Club
Woodcote Cricket Club
Woodley Cricket Club
Wraysbury Cricket Club
Yateley Cricket Club
