= Chalvey Road =

Sports venue in Slough, England

Coordinates: 51.5054°N 0.6003°W

- Interactive map of Chalvey Road

Ground information
- Location: Slough, Buckinghamshire
- Country: England
- Establishment: 1899 (first recorded match)

International information
- Only women's ODI: 29 July 1993: India v Denmark

Team information
Buckinghamshire	(1904-1914, 1920, 1933-1970, 1980-1998)
Minor Counties	(1981, 1983 & 1986)
Berkshire	(1999)
- As of 6 September 2020; Source: Ground profile

Chalvey Road was a cricket ground in Slough, Buckinghamshire. Slough Cricket Club moved to the ground in 1899, with the first recorded match on the ground in 1904, when Buckinghamshire played Berkshire in the Minor Counties Championship. From 1904 to 1998 the ground hosted 57 Minor Counties Championship matches, the last of which saw Buckinghamshire play Norfolk. Buckinghamshire also played a single MCCA Knockout Trophy match held at the ground, against Oxfordshire in 1992. In 1999, Berkshire played an MCCA Knockout Trophy match against the Sussex Cricket Board.

The ground has also held List-A matches. The first List-A match held on the ground was between a combined Minor Counties and Middlesex in the 1981 Benson and Hedges Cup. From 1981 to 1986, the ground hosted 5 List-A matches, the last of which saw a combined Minor Counties side play Northamptonshire in the 1986 Benson and Hedges Cup.

In local domestic cricket, the ground was the home venue of Slough Cricket Club from 1899 to 1999, when after 100 years of playing at the ground, the club moved to a new purpose built ground at Upton Court Road, which was held both Buckinghamshire and Berkshire home matches. The ground has since been developed with housing.
