= Home Counties Premier Cricket League =

ECB Premier League

- Countries: England
- Format: Limited Overs
- First edition: 2000
- Tournament format: League
- Number of teams: 10 (Division 1)
- Current champion: High Wycombe CC
- Most successful: High Wycombe CC (11)
- Website: https://hcpcl.play-cricket.com

The Home Counties Premier Cricket League is the top level of competition for recreational club cricket in the Home Counties of England, and has been a designated ECB Premier League since its founding in 2000. It originally served Bedfordshire, Berkshire, Buckinghamshire, Hertfordshire and Oxfordshire, although there are at present no Bedfordshire clubs in the league and all but one of the Hertfordshire clubs withdrew after the 2013 season.

Until 2013 the league consisted of a Division One of ten clubs and a Division Two (East) and a Division Two (West), each of ten clubs, with promotion between Divisions and to and from the feeder leagues. With the withdrawal of the Hertfordshire clubs, the structure was simplified and there is now just Division One and Division Two.

There are two feeder leagues, covering narrower areas within the region:

- Cherwell Cricket League - Primarily Oxfordshire, but also with clubs from Bedfordshire, Buckinghamshire, Hertfordshire, and Northamptonshire. In the past there have also been clubs from Gloucestershire and Wiltshire.
- Thames Valley Cricket League - A wide area to the west of London. Most clubs have traditionally been from Berkshire and Buckinghamshire, but there are also clubs from Hampshire, Hertfordshire, Middlesex, Oxfordshire, and Surrey.

With the exception of Tring Park who have remained in the Home Counties Premier Cricket League, the Hertfordshire clubs now take part in the Hertfordshire Cricket League.

== Champions ==
- League Champions 2000–2019
  Year	Club
  2000	Banbury
  2001	Finchampstead
  2002	High Wycombe
  2003	High Wycombe
  2004	Henley
  2005	High Wycombe
  2006	Slough
  2007	Oxford
  2008	High Wycombe
  2009	Henley
  2010	Henley
  2011	High Wycombe
  2012	High Wycombe
  2013	Henley
  2014	Henley
  2015	High Wycombe
  2016	Finchampstead
  2017	Henley
  2018	Henley
  2019	Henley
- League Champions 2020–present
  Year	Club
  2020	no competition
  2021	High Wycombe
  2022	Aston Rowant
  2023	High Wycombe
  2024	Henley
  2025	High Wycombe
  2026	High Wycombe

=== Championships won ===
- League champions
  Wins	Club
  11	High Wycombe
  9	Henley
  2	Finchampstead
  1	Aston Rowant
  1	Banbury
  1	Oxford
  1	Slough

== Performance by season from 2000 ==
Key
Gold	Champions
Blue	Left League
Red	Relegated

Performance by season, from 2000
Club	2000	2001	2002	2003	2004	2005	2006	2007	2008	2009	2010	2011	2012	2013	2014	2015	2016	2017	2018	2019	2021	2022	2023	2024	2025	2026
Aston Rowant											10				9				3	4	4	1	3	4	4	5
Banbury	1	2	6	4	2	5	6	5	2	2	5	7	2	3	4	2	4	4	5	2	3	2	5	7	5	3
Basingstoke and North Hants	6	4	5	7	6																					
Beaconsfield	4	7	7	10																						
Bicester and North Oxford	7	8	10																							
Bishop's Stortford												8	9													
Bletchley Town	10																									
Buckingham Town																				7	6	9				
Burnham													6	6	7	6	7	10								
Datchet																				3	5	6	4	9		
Falkland						7	5	8	10			10														
Farnham Royal								9		10																
Finchampstead	5	1	9		8	8	4	10									1	3	7	6	7	8	7	2	3	4
Gerrards Cross															10											
Great and Little Tew																	8	9								
Great Brickhill																								8	7	10
Harefield															8	7	10						9		8	7
Harpenden (Note: Harpenden, North Mymms, Potters Bar, and Welwyn Garden City left Division 1 after the 2013 season. They and all the clubs in Division 2 East joined the Hertfordshire Cricket League.)											8	3	7	4												
Hemel Hempstead Town				9																						
Henley			4	8	1	4	3	7	6	1	1	4	4	1	1	3	2	1	1	1	2	3	6	1	6	6
High Wycombe	2	3	1	1	4	1	2	4	1	3	6	1	1	7	2	1	3	5	4	5	1	5	1	3	1	1
Horspath (Note: Oxford and Horspath split into two clubs after the 2003 season; Oxford took the place in Division One while Horspath have since also reached Division One.)																9		8	8	9						
Luton Town	9	10																								
North Mymms						10								8												
Oxford					7	6	8	1	4	8	3	5	10		6	10		2	9		8	10				
Oxford and Horspath				6																						
Oxford Downs																								5	2	2
Potters Bar					10					6	9		8	10												
Radlett	8	9	8	5	9			3	5	5	7	9														
Reading	3	6	3	3	5	3	7	6	9							4	9									
Slough		5	2	2	3	2	1	2	8	9				2	3	5	5	7	2	10		7	10			9
Stoke Green																									10	
Thame Town																			10		9					
Tring Park							9		3	4	4	2	3	5	5	8	6	6	6	8	10					
Wargrave																							2	6	9	
Welwyn Garden City									7	7	2	6	5	9												
West Herts							10																			
Wokingham																						4	8	10		8
References																										
